= Dick Hogan =

American actor

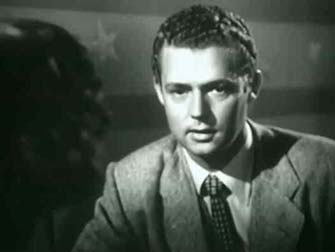
- Hogan in the 1948 film, Shed No Tears
- Born: Dixon Howard Hogan; November 27, 1917; Little Rock, Arkansas, United States
- Died: August 18, 1995 (aged 77); Little Rock, Arkansas, United States
- Occupation: Actor
- Years active: 1937–48

Dixon Howard "Dick" Hogan (November 27, 1917 – August 18, 1995) was an American actor of the 1930s and 1940s. During his 12-year career he appeared in over three dozen films, in roles which varied from unnamed bellhops to featured and starring roles. His final film performance was as the murder victim in Alfred Hitchcock's Rope (1948).

== Life and career ==
Hogan was born in Little Rock, Arkansas, on November 27, 1917. While he attended the University of Arkansas, he sang in local venues and modeled for department stores.

He entered the film industry at the age of 19, his first role in the small part of one of the young men in a Civilian Conservation Corps (CCC) camp in the 1937 drama Blazing Barriers. His next film had him in the featured role of Bob D. Wilson in Annapolis Salute, directed by Christy Cabanne. After small roles in Saturday's Heroes (1937), and The Storm (1938), he was again seen in a principal role in the 1938 John Ford comedy-drama, Submarine Patrol. In 1939 he appeared in Charlie Chan in Reno (1939).

The early 1940s had Hogan appearing in lead and featured roles in numerous films. In 1940, he was featured in The Marines Fly High (1940), starring Richard Dix and Lucille Ball, as one of Dix's company of marines. He then appeared in Rancho Grande, in which he played a spoiled rich heir unhappy at having to live on his grandfather's ranch. He also had a featured role later that year in One Crowded Night, starring Billie Seward and William Haade. Hogan had a starring role in the 1940 western, Prairie Law, which also starred George O'Brien and Virginia Vale. Hogan also had a featured role that year in the drama One Crowded Night.

Hogan began 1941 as a bellhop in Play Girl, a romantic comedy starring Kay Francis, and then appeared in a featured role in Pot o' Gold, a musical comedy starring James Stewart and Paulette Goddard. The film was remarkable, as it was the only film produced by James Roosevelt, the eldest son of Franklin D. Roosevelt. In 1942 he appeared in several films in smaller roles, until late in the year when he had the featured role of Gibby Dapper in the Lew Landers' biopic, Smith of Minnesota (1942), about and starring the Heisman Trophy winner Bruce Smith, after which Mug Town was released, in which Hogan starred along with the Dead End Kids. Mug Town was followed quickly with a leading role in the 1943 comedy-drama, Cinderella Swings It, the final film in the "Scattergood Baines" film series.

After a small role in the spy film, They Came to Blow Up America, starring George Sanders, Hogan had a featured role in the World War II drama, Action in the North Atlantic (1943), starring Humphrey Bogart. His final screen performance of the year was in another World War II drama, this one set in the Pacific theater, So Proudly We Hail!, starring Claudette Colbert, Paulette Goddard (nominated for an Academy Award for Best Supporting Actress), and Veronica Lake.

In October 1942, Hogan joined the United States Army Air Corps. As part of a company of actors in the Corps, Hogan and his wife appeared in an Air Corps production titled, Winged Victory, written and directed by Moss Hart, which was a large hit on Broadway at the 44th Street Theatre, before touring the United States for two years. Hogan, cast as Cpl. Richard Hogan, would also appear in George Cukor's film version of the same name. However, on Broadway he played the role of Frankie Davis one of the leads, while in the film he was cast as Jimmy Gardner.

After leaving the service, Hogan returned to the film industry, but only for a short time. In 1947 he appeared in a featured role in Blaze of Noon, starring Anne Baxter and William Holden. In 1948 he was featured in two more films: Beyond Glory, starring Alan Ladd and Donna Reed; and Shed No Tears, starring Wallace Ford and June Vincent. Even though it was the first film he worked on in 1948, his final on-screen performance was in Alfred Hitchcock's Rope. In it, Hogan played the crucial role of David Kentley, the erstwhile friend who is strangled at the beginning of the picture and whose body is hidden in a chest while the murderers' guests have dinner in the same room. Hogan is only alive for a number of seconds in the film, but he has a larger scene with dialogue in film's trailer. Hogan's final acting appearance was on the Broadway stage, in the unsuccessful comedy, Time for Elizabeth, which ran for only eight performances at the Fulton Theatre in September–October 1948.

He retired from acting after the close of the play, and returned to his hometown of Little Rock, where he became an insurance agent. He was known as an avid fan of Bing Crosby, and (as of 1943) he had a complete collection of all of Crosby's records. Hogan died on August 18, 1995, at the age of 77 in Little Rock.

=== Singing ===
Before he began acting in films, Hogan sang with the Glenn Miller Orchestra and in nightclubs.

== Filmography ==
(Per AFI database.)

Year	Title	Role	Notes
1937	Blazing Barriers	CCC worker	
1937	Annapolis Salute	Bob D. Wilson	
1937	Saturday's Heroes	Freshman	
1938	Rebellious Daughters	Bill Evans	
1938	Submarine Patrol	Seaman Johnny Miller	
1938	The Storm	Slim	
1939	Sorority House	Relief Squad Freshman	Uncredited
1939	Charlie Chan in Reno	Jack - college student	Uncredited
1939	Five Came Back	Larry	
1939	5th Avenue Girl	Skippy's Friend	Uncredited
1939	Three Sons	Freddie Pardway	
1940	The Marines Fly High	Corporal Haines	
1940	Rancho Grande	Tom Dodge	
1940	Prairie Law	Billy	
1940	Lucky Partners	Bellboy	Uncredited
1940	One Crowded Night	Vince Sanders	
1940	Mexican Spitfire Out West	Bellhop	Uncredited
1940	The Fargo Kid	Young prospector	Uncredited
1941	Play Girl	Bellhop	Uncredited
1941	Pot o' Gold	Willie McCorkle	
1941	Harmon of Michigan	Bonetti	Uncredited
1941	Uncle Joe	Bill Jones	
1942	Gang Busters	Announcer in Title Sequence	Voice, Uncredited
1942	Ten Gentlemen from West Point	Cadet	Uncredited
1942	Tough as They Come	Jim Bond	Uncredited
1942	Rubber Racketeers	Bert	
1942	Orchestra Wives	Teenager	Uncredited
1942	The Spirit of Stanford	Student	Uncredited
1942	Smith of Minnesota	Gibby Dapper	Uncredited
1942	The Mummy's Tomb	Boy	Uncredited
1942	Army Surgeon	Saunders	Uncredited
1942	Mug Town	Don Bell	
1942	Thunder Birds	Cadet	
1943	Cinderella Swings It	Tommy Stewart	
1943	They Came to Blow Up America	Coast Guardsman	
1943	Action in the North Atlantic	Cadet Robert Parker	
1943	So Proudly We Hail!	Flight Lieutenant Archie McGregor	
1944	Winged Victory	Jimmy Gardner	Uncredited
1947	Blaze of Noon	Sydney	
1948	Shed No Tears	Tom Grover	
1948	Beyond Glory	Cadet Sergeant Eddie Loughlin	
1948	Rope	David Kentley	(final film role)
