= The Painted Desert =

1931 film

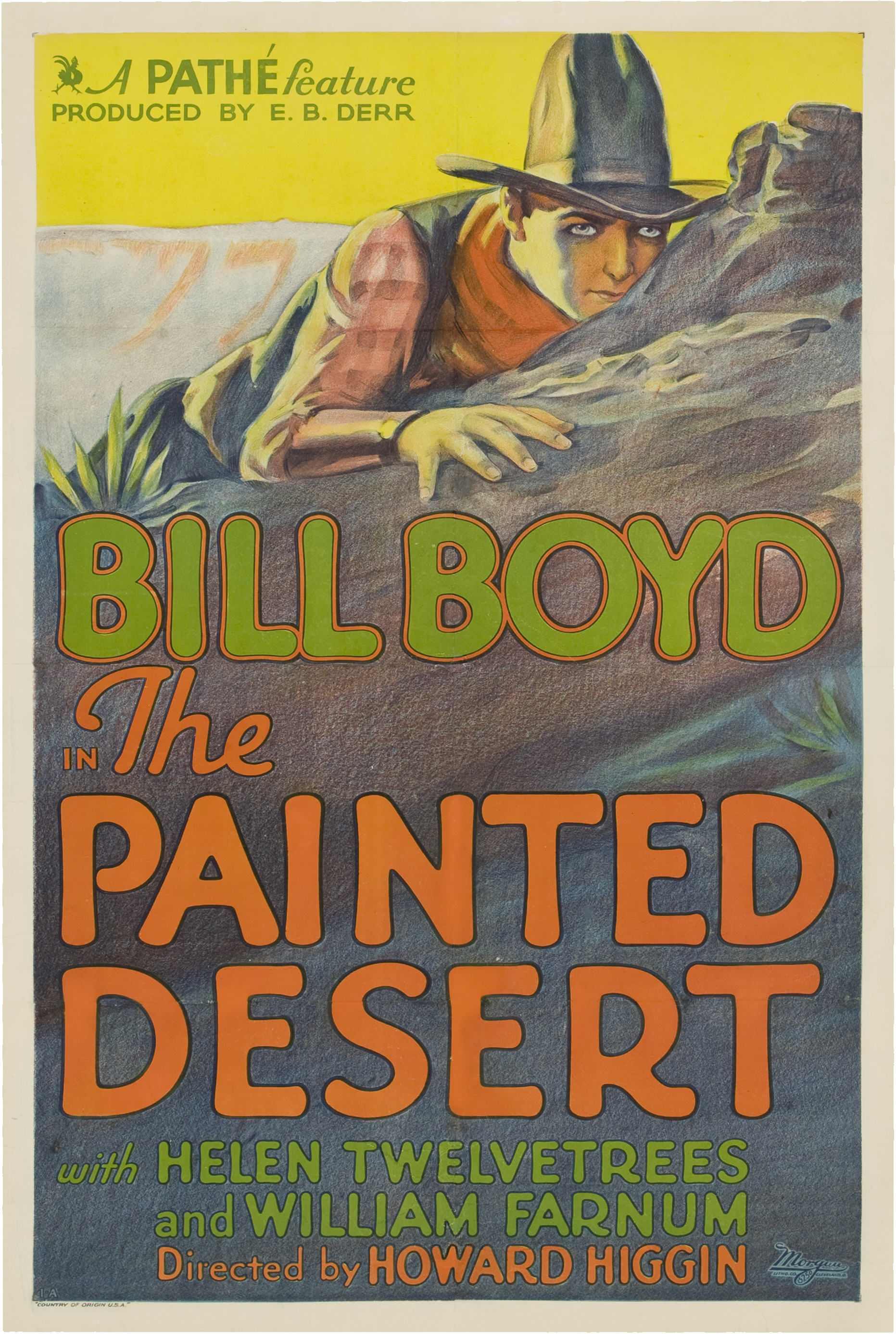
- Theatrical release poster
- Directed by: Howard Higgin; Bert Gilroy
- Written by: Tom Buckingham; Howard Higgin
- Produced by: E. B. Derr
- Starring: William Boyd; Helen Twelvetrees; William Farnum
- Cinematography: Edward Snyder
- Edited by: Clarence Kolster
- Music by: Francis Gromon
- Production company: Pathé Exchange
- Distributed by: RKO Radio Pictures
- Release date: January 18, 1931 (US)
- Running time: 85 minutes 75 minutes (edited reissue)
- Country: United States
- Language: English

The Painted Desert is a 1931 American pre-Code Western film released by Pathé Exchange. Produced by E. B. Derr, it was directed by Howard Higgin, who also co-wrote the screenplay with Tom Buckingham. The picture stars low-budget Western stars William Boyd (in his pre-Hopalong Cassidy era) and Helen Twelvetrees, and most notably features an unshaven young Clark Gable in his talking film debut. The film was shot mostly on location in Arizona.

== Plot ==
Two cowboy friends, Jeff and Cash, are traveling through the desert in the southwest U.S., when they come upon a baby who has been abandoned in the back of a covered wagon. Unwilling to leave the defenseless child they decide to take the baby with them; however, they argue over which of them would be better suited to raising the child. When Cash ends up prevailing in the debate, this creates a lifelong rift between the two friends.

Years later the baby has now grown into a young man, Bill Holbrook, who works with his adoptive father on their cattle ranch. Cash's erstwhile friend, Jeff, has remained in the area where the infant was found and has established his own ranch, centered on the water hole where the entire feud originally began, a feud which is still in full force. Jeff lives with his grown daughter, Mary Ellen. The feud escalates when Cash wants to use the water hole on Jeff's property to water his cattle. Jeff is ready to confront Cash in a stand-off, preventing him from watering his cattle on the property Jeff has claimed, assisted by an itinerant cowboy, Rance Brett, who has been smitten with Mary Ellen's beauty. The confrontation is temporarily avoided when Cash's herd unexpectedly stampedes.

When Bill discovers tungsten on Jeff's property, he attempts to use it to close the division between his father and Jeff, but this only results in his father kicking him out. He turns to Jeff, and begins a mining operation, which actually has the opposite effect of Bill's original intention, only exacerbating the tension between Jeff and Cash. Bill and Jeff's partnership also causes tension with Rance, since Mary Ellen now shows an interest in Bill. After a shipment of tungsten which was on its way to pay the loan they had taken out to develop the mine is waylaid, Bill works furiously with the miners to replace it with another load. He is successful. However, as he is celebrating the success of the mine, as well as his impending nuptials with Mary Ellen, the mine is sabotaged by a series of explosions.

Everyone believes the mine sabotage is the work of Cash, but it turns out to have been an act of jealousy on the part of Rance, who confesses, leaving the two old friends to reconcile, and their two children to marry.

== Cast (in credits order) ==
- William Boyd as Bill Holbrook [credited as Bill Boyd]
- Helen Twelvetrees as Mary Ellen Cameron
- William Farnum as Bill 'Cash' Holbrook
- J. Farrell MacDonald as Jeff Cameron
- Clark Gable as Rance Brett
- Charles Sellon as Tonopah
- Hugh Adams as 'Dynamite'
- Wade Boteler as Bob Carson – Ore Wagon #1 Driver
- Will Walling as Kirby
- Edmund Breese as Judge Matthews
- Guy Edward Hearn as Tex
- William LeMaire as Denver
- Richard Cramer as Provney
- Al St. John as Buck (uncredited)

(Cast list as per named cast members on the AFI database)

== Production ==
The Painted Desert was put on the slate by Pathé Exchange in June 1930. In July, it was announced that E.B. Derr had selected Higgin to direct the film, as well as naming the stars of the film, William Boyd and Dorothy Burgess. Later in the month, it was reported that Higgin would head to Arizona to begin location scouting for the film, accompanied by fellow director, Tay Garnett; however, in August, Higgin began scouting in the Arizona desert with the screenwriter, Tom Buckingham. It was announced that the film would employ over 300 extras.

Higgin was familiar with the area, having worked in and around Flagstaff, Arizona as a lumberjack prior to his entering the film industry. Towards the end of August, it was announced that Clark Gable would join the cast as the antagonist.

In September, it was announced that Helen Twelvetrees had replaced Burgess in the cast. Tragedy struck the production shortly after filming began when the fourteen-month-old baby playing the role of the infant Bill Holbrook, died while on location. Cause of death was not released. The infant's name was Thais Baer, and she was from Glendale, Arizona. Bert Gilroy was named as assistant director, and production began the first week of September. Shortly after, it was announced that William Farnum and J. Farrell MacDonald had been added to the cast. During production, Charles Craig was replaced in the cast by Jerry Drew. During production, somewhere between twelve and forty actors were seriously injured in a dynamite explosion when the charge went off early during filming, and two crew members lost their lives; the injured included the director, Howard Higgin.

The film's release was delayed several times. In early October the film's release was announced to be October 26, but by late October that release date was pushed back, to a premiere date of November 20. In the first week of November the cast and crew returned from location in Arizona to finish the interior scenes on the studio lot in Hollywood.

Ninety percent of the film was shot in Arizona, between the Painted Desert in Dinosaur Canyon, and Tuba City, Arizona, as well as a nearby Indian reservation. In mid-November it was reported that the recording portion of the film had been completed. Clarence Kolster edited the film during December 1930. By November, advertisements promoting the film were being released to the trade papers.

Produced by Pathé Exchange, the film would become part of the RKO Radio Pictures library when they purchased the studio in March, after which they took over distribution of the film.

== Reception ==
Most reviews of the film were positive. Motion Picture Magazine thought the film was "worth seeing", and complimented the acting, the message and the cinematography. They stated that while you could call the plot "... hokum if you will, it's the hokum of which life is made and the spectacle of the clasped hands at the end brings an authentic thrill". The National Board of Review Magazine called the film an "exciting and well done" melodrama.

Picture Play magazine, while complimented the acting, commented that it could not "...make a picture unaided by a story", and declaring the film was "duller and more pointless picture ..." than any they had ever seen.

== Copyright status ==
In 1958, the film entered the public domain in the USA due to the copyright claimants' failure to renew the copyright registration in the 28th year after publication.

It was remade by RKO in 1938 as Painted Desert. The studio cut several action scenes directly from the negative of their earlier version for insertion into the remake.

== Home media ==
The Painted Desert has seen numerous budget public domain label releases on VHS and DVD. The film's original release length was 83:43, but all home video releases are of its edited 75-minute reissue version, missing the action scenes appropriated for the remake. In 2019, Kino Lorber released it alongside The Pay-Off (1930) and The Silver Horde (1930) on their "RKO Classic Adventures" Blu-ray and DVD. These transfers were restored by Lobster Films of France, but inexplicably The Painted Desert is still in its truncated form, despite its missing scenes being present in the extant 1938 remake.

== Notes ==
The love interest in this film, Helen Twelvetrees, was a very popular actress in the early 1930s, but was let go by the studio in 1936, at which point she retired from film. She was the answer to a popular Johnny Carson gag on The Tonight Show, "Who was Rin Tin Tin's favorite actress?"

A myth about Gable evolved regarding this film. It was said that he did not know how to ride a horse prior to this film, and learned specifically for his supporting role in The Painted Desert. However, Gable had been a horseman since his early years, and merely took several lessons in Griffith Park prior to the commencement of filming in order to hone his skills.

William Farnum was a major star during the silent era in Hollywood, starring in one of the earliest and most popular Westerns, the 1914 film The Spoilers. When he was injured during the filming of 1924's The Man Who Fights Alone, that effectively ended his leading man career. He carried on as a character actor until his death in 1953.

The 1938 remake was directed by David Howard and starred George O'Brien, Laraine Johnson, and Ray Whitley.

The film is notable for the superior cinematography of the Arizona desert by Edward Snyder.
