= Prairie Law =

1940 film directed by David Howard

- Directed by: David Howard
- Screenplay by: Doris Schroeder; Arthur V. Jones
- Story by: Bernard McConville
- Produced by: Bert Gilroy
- Starring: George O'Brien; Virginia Vale; Dick Hogan
- Cinematography: J. Roy Hunt; Harry Wild
- Edited by: Frederic Knudtson
- Music by: Paul Sawtell
- Production company: RKO Radio Pictures
- Release date: June 14, 1940 (US)
- Running time: 60 minutes
- Country: United States
- Language: English

Prairie Law is a 1940 American Western film directed by David Howard from a screenplay by Doris Schroeder and Arthur V. Jones, based on a story by Bernard McConville. Released on June 14, 1940, the film was produced and distributed by RKO Radio Pictures and stars George O'Brien, Virginia Vale, and Dick Hogan.

== Cast ==
- George O'Brien as Brill Austin
- Virginia Vale as Priscilla Brambull
- Dick Hogan as Larry Brambull
- J. Farrell MacDonald as Sheriff Jim Austin
- Slim Whitaker as Silent
- Cy Kendall as Pete Gore (as Cyrus W. Kendall)
- Paul Everton as Judge Ben Curry
- Henry Hall as Franklin Brambull
- Monte Montague as Sam Sully
- Quen Ramsey as Murph
