= Ted Richmond =

American film producer

Ted Richmond (June 10, 1910 – December 23, 2013) was an American film producer credited with 66 films between 1940 and 1979. He was born in New Bedford, Massachusetts.

Richmond produced films for several studios including Universal Pictures, Metro-Goldwyn-Mayer and Columbia Pictures. His most noted films include Return of the Seven (1966; with Yul Brynner), Red Sun (1971; with Charles Bronson), and Papillon (1973; with Steve McQueen and Dustin Hoffman). He died in Paris at the age of 103 in 2013.

== Career ==
Richmond was born in New Bedford, Massachusetts. He first worked in the movie business as an usher at a local theater. He got into the film industry as an assistant director and providing stories at Monogram Studios. He eventually turned producer. In the mid-1940s he moved to Columbia Studios.

In the late 1940s he moved to Universal, where he produced the early starring vehicles for Audie Murphy. He made The Mississippi Gambler (1953) with Tyrone Power and the two men got along so well they decided to form a company together, Copa Productions. They made Count Three and Pray (1955) and Nightfall (1957) without Power in the cast, and Abandon Ship! (1957) and Solomon and Sheba (1959) with him. Power died during the filming of Solomon in Spain.

Richmond moved to MGM where he made Bachelor in Paradise (1961) and It Happened at the World's Fair (1963).

Richmond spent the last 30 years of his life in Paris with his wife, Asuko.

== Partial filmography ==
- Phantom Ranger (1938) (assistant director)
- Two Gun Justice (1938) (assistant director)
- Trigger Pals (1939) - original story
- Six-Gun Rhythm (1939) - original story
- The Last Alarm (1940) (associate producer)
- Caught in the Act (1941)
- South of Panama (1941)
- Gambling Daughters (1941)
- Jungle Man (1941)
- Blonde Comet (1941)
- She's in the Army (1942)
- The Mummy's Curse (1944) - story
- The Soul of a Monster (1944)
- Kansas City Kitty (1944)
- Behind Closed Doors (1944)
- She's a Sweetheart (1944)
- Meet Miss Bobby Socks (1944)
- Let's Go Steady (1945)
- Youth on Trial (1945)
- Blonde from Brooklyn (1945)
- Hit the Hay (1945)
- The Notorious Lone Wolf (1946)
- Night Editor (1946)
- Dangerous Business (1946)
- It's Great to Be Young (1946)
- So Dark the Night (1946)
- Blackie and the Law (1946)
- Give and Take (1946)
- Blind Spot (1947)
- King of the Wild Horses (1947)
- The Lone Wolf in London (1947)
- Above All Laws (1948)
- Best Man Wins (1948)
- Thunderhoof (1948)
- The Big Deal (1949)
- Make Believe Ballroom (1949)
- Holiday in Havana (1949)
- Hitting the Jackpot (1949)
- Shakedown (1950)
- Blondie's Hero (1950)
- Kansas Raiders (1950)
- The Milkman (1950)
- Smuggler's Island (1951)
- Week-End with Father (1951)
- The Strange Door (1951)
- The Cimarron Kid (1952)
- Bonzo Goes to College (1952)
- Has Anybody Seen My Gal (1952)
- No Room for the Groom (1952)
- Bronco Buster (1952)
- Walking My Baby Back Home (1953)
- Forbidden (1953)
- Column South (1953)
- Desert Legion (1953)
- The Mississippi Gambler (1953)
- Rails Into Laramie (1954)
- Bengal Brigade (1954)
- Francis Joins the WACS (1954)
- Count Three and Pray (1955)
- Nightfall (1957)
- Abandon Ship! (1957) (aka Seven Waves Away)
- Solomon and Sheba (1959)
- Bachelor in Paradise (1961)
- It Happened at the World's Fair (1963) (producer - uncredited)
- Company of Cowards? (1964) (aka Advance to the Rear)
- Return of the Seven (1966)
- Villa Rides (1968)
- Red Sun (1971)
- Papillon (1973)
- Breakthrough (1979)
- The Fifth Musketeer (1979)
