= Edward Killy =

American film director (1903–1981)

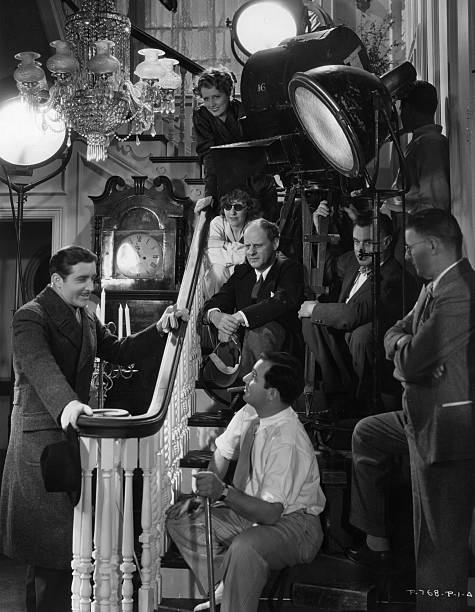
- Assistant director Edward Killy (center foreground) rehearses actor John Boles (left) on the set of The Age of Innocence (1934)
- Born: Edward Arthur Killy; January 26, 1903; Connecticut, United States
- Died: July 2, 1981 (aged 78); Orange County, California, United States
- Occupations: Director, assistant director, production manager
- Years active: 1931–61
- Spouse: Pauline Watkins Killy (?-1981, his death)

Edward Arthur Killy (January 26, 1903 – July 2, 1981) was an American director, assistant director and production manager in films and television. He was one of the few individuals to be nominated for the short-lived Academy Award for Best Assistant Director. During his 30-year career he worked on over 75 films and television shows.

== Life and career ==
Killy was born on January 26, 1903, in Connecticut. He entered the film industry as an assistant director at RKO Pictures, his first film being the 1931 musical comedy, Caught Plastered, directed by William Seiter, and starring the comedy duo of Bert Wheeler and Robert Woolsey. Over the next five years he assisted on over a dozen films, many of them notable films. In 1932 he was one of two assistants to George Cukor on the drama What Price Hollywood?, starring Constance Bennett and Lowell Sherman. In 1933 he was one of several assistants to Dorothy Arzner on the melodrama Christopher Strong, which featured Katharine Hepburn in her first starring role. He worked with Hepburn on two more films in 1933, Morning Glory (one of three assisting Lowell Sherman), and one of two assisting Cukor on the classic, Little Women. That year he also assisted Seiter again on another Wheeler & Woolsey comedy, Diplomaniacs, as well as being one of three assistants to Thornton Freeland on the RKO musical Flying Down to Rio, which featured the first on-screen pairing of Fred Astaire and Ginger Rogers. The following year Killy assisted Philip Moeller on the classic drama The Age of Innocence, the first talking version of the novel, starring Irene Dunne and John Boles.

He worked with Hepburn again, being one of three assistants to Richard Wallace on The Little Minister. It was during the filming of this movie when Killy gained notoriety by telling off Hepburn. She was acting up on set one day and refusing to take her place on set, so he told her, "Get on the set before you're sent back to New York to do another Lake." However, he soon became one of her favorite assistant directors.

In 1935 Killy became part of a concerted effort on RKO's part to build a cadre of young directors. His first assignment as the main man behind the camera was as co-director with William Hamilton, on the 1935 film Freckles, based on the 1904 novel of the same name. The two would again pair up to direct the 1935 version of Seven Keys to Baldpate, starring Gene Raymond and Margaret Callahan. The pair co-directed two more films before Killy was given his first solo directing assignment, 1936's Second Wife, starring Gertrude Michael and Walter Abel. Over the next ten years, he directed another 20 films, mostly B movie Westerns, and being the chief director for Tim Holt's Westerns. Some of the oater collaborations between Killy and Holt include: The Fargo Kid (1940), Wagon Train (1940), Along the Rio Grande (1941), and Land of the Open Range (1942). In the mid-1940s, a young actor, Robert Mitchum, was signed to a seven-year contract with RKO, with the intent of making B-Westerns based on Zane Grey novels. Killy was assigned the first of these films, 1944's Nevada. He would also direct Mitchum in another film adaptation of a Grey novel, 1945's West of the Pecos, which was also Killy's last credit as the director of a film.

Even after getting the opportunity to take the helm of films, Killy was one of the rare people to continue to work at the assistant director level. As an assistant he worked on several notable features including: Roberta, directed by Seiter, and starring Irene Dunne, Fred Astaire, Ginger Rogers, and Randolph Scott; again with Hepburn on Alice Adams (1935), with George Stevens directing; the classic war film Gunga Din, again directed by Stevens, and starring Cary Grant, Victor McLaglen, and Douglas Fairbanks Jr.; The Hunchback of Notre Dame (1939), assisting William Dieterle, and starring Charles Laughton as Quasimodo and Maureen O'Hara as Esmeralda; Gregory La Cava's Primrose Path, starring Ginger Rogers and Joel McCrea; Bombardier (1943), directed by Richard Wallace, and starring Pat O'Brien and Randolph Scott; 1944's romantic comedy, also directed by Wallace, Bride by Mistake, starring Alan Marshal and Laraine Day; Susan Slept Here (1954), a romantic comedy directed by Frank Tashlin and starring Debbie Reynolds and Dick Powell in his final film performance; and the Howard Hughes' production of The Conqueror, directed by Dick Powell, and starring John Wayne.

In the late 1940s through the 1950s, Killy would also occasionally work as a production manager on such films as: Blood on the Moon (1948), The Big Steal (1949), Angel Face, Jet Pilot, and All Mine to Give (1958).

Killy married Pauline Watkins, and would remain married to her until his death in 1981. The two adopted a daughter in the 1930s, Audrey K. Killy. Killy died July 2, 1981, in Orange County, California.

== Filmography ==
(Per AFI database)

- Caught Plastered (1931) – assistant director
- Too Many Cooks (1931) – assistant director
- What Price Hollywood? (1932) – assistant director
- Diplomaniacs (1933) – assistant director
- Bed of Roses (1933) – assistant director
- Emergency Call (1933) – assistant director
- Christopher Strong (1933) – assistant director
- Morning Glory (1933) – assistant director
- Little Women (1933) – assistant director
- Flying Down to Rio (1933) – assistant director
- Finishing School (1934) – assistant director
- Sing and Like It (1934) – assistant director
- The Little Minister (1934) – assistant director
- Down to Their Last Yacht (1934) – assistant director
- Hips, Hips, Hooray! (1934) – assistant director
- The Age of Innocence (1934) – assistant director
- Break of Hearts (1935) – assistant director
- Seven Keys to Baldpate (1935) – director
- Alice Adams (1935) – assistant director
- Freckles (1935) – director
- Roberta (1935) – assistant director
- The Big Game (1936) – director
- Murder on a Bridle Path (1936) – director
- Bunker Bean (1936) – director
- Second Wife (1936) – director
- Wanted! Jane Turner (1936) – director
- Criminal Lawyer (1937) – director
- Saturday's Heroes (1937) – director
- Quick Money (1937) – director
- The Big Shot (1937) – director
- China Passage (1937) – director
- 5th Avenue Girl (1939) – assistant director
- Bachelor Mother (1939) – assistant director
- The Hunchback of Notre Dame (1939) – assistant director
- Gunga Din (1939) – assistant director
- The Flying Irishman (1939) – assistant director
- Primrose Path (1940) – assistant director
- The Fargo Kid (1940) – director
- Wagon Train (1940) – director
- Triple Justice (1940) – assistant director
- Stage to Chino (1940) – director
- Along the Rio Grande (1941) – director
- The Bandit Trail (1941) – director
- Come on Danger (1941) – director
- Cyclone on Horseback (1941) – director
- Robbers of the Range (1941) – director
- Land of the Open Range (1942) – director
- The Navy Comes Through (1942) – assistant director
- Riding the Wind (1942) – director
- The Tuttles of Tahiti (1942) – assistant director
- The Iron Major (1943) – assistant director
- Bombardier (1943) – assistant director
- Marine Raiders (1944) – assistant director
- Nevada (1944) – director
- Bride by Mistake (1944) – assistant director
- Wanderer of the Wasteland (1945) – director
- West of the Pecos (1945) – director
- Sinbad the Sailor (1947) – production assistant
- Tycoon (1947) – production assistant
- Blood on the Moon (1948) – production manager
- Adventure in Baltimore (1949) – production manager
- The Big Steal (1949) – production manager
- The Set-Up (1949) – assistant director
- Stromboli (1950) – production manager
- The Lusty Men (1952) – assistant director
- Androcles and the Lion (1953) – production manager
- Angel Face (1953) – unit manager
- She Couldn't Say No (1954) – unit production manager
- Dangerous Mission (1954) – unit production manager
- Susan Slept Here (1954) – assistant director
- The Girl Rush (1955) – assistant director
- The Conqueror (1956) – assistant director
- Run for the Sun (1956) – assistant director
- Tension at Table Rock (1956) – unit manager
- Jet Pilot (1957) – unit production manager
- Gunsight Ridge (1957) – assistant director
- All Mine to Give (1958) – unit manager
