= Wagon Train (film) =

1940 film

- Theatrical release poster
- Directed by: Edward Killy
- Screenplay by: Morton Grant
- Story by: Bernard McConville
- Produced by: Bert Gilroy
- Starring: Tim Holt
- Cinematography: Harry J. Wild
- Edited by: Frederic Knudtson; Harry Marker
- Music by: Paul Sawtell
- Distributed by: RKO Pictures
- Release date: October 4, 1940
- Running time: 59 minutes
- Country: United States
- Language: English

Wagon Train is a 1940 American Western film directed by Edward Killy and starring Tim Holt. It was this film that really started Holt's series of B Westerns for RKO, replacing those made by George O'Brien.

== Plot summary ==
Pecos businessman Matt Gardner is buying up freighters, or wagon trains of food supplies, at cheap prices through intimidation, and charging high prices by deliberately causing phony food shortages at his trading posts. The only one refusing to sell his supplies is Zack Sibley, who is dead set on maintaining his freighter business as well as tracking down his father's murderer, his ex-business partner. Gardner plans on eliminating any competition Sibley presents by sending his thugs to kill him and raid his wagon train.

== Cast ==
- Tim Holt as Zack Sibley
- Ray Whitley as Ned
- Emmett Lynn as Whopper
- Martha O'Driscoll as Helen Lee
- Malcolm 'Bud' McTaggart as Coe Gardner
- Cliff Clark as Carl Anderson, alias Matt Gardner
- Ellen Lowe as Amanthy (Whopper's Lady Friendl)
- Wade Crosby as Wagonmaster O'Follard
- Ethan Laidlaw as Henchman Pat Hays
- Monte Montague as Henchman Kurt
- Carl Stockdale as Mr. Wilkes (Gardner's Lawyer)
- Bruce Dane as McKenzie
- Glenn Strange as Stagecoach Driver

== Production ==
The film was the first in a series of six Westerns RKO planned with Holt. Martha O'Driscoll was signed to appear in the first two.

The films proved so popular the series continued until the early 1950s.

O'Driscoll and Holt were meant to reteam in Sir Piegan Passes but it was not made.

It was filmed in Kanab, Utah and in Wildwood Regional Park in Thousand Oaks, California.

== Soundtrack ==
- Ray Whitley – "Wagon Train" (Written by Ray Whitley and Fred Rose)
- Ray Whitley and Glenn Strange – "Why Shore" (Written by Ray Whitley and Fred Rose)
- "A Girl Just Like You" (Written by Ray Whitley and Fred Rose)
- "Farewell" (Written by Ray Whitley and Fred Rose)
