= The Border Patrolman =

1936 film by David Howard

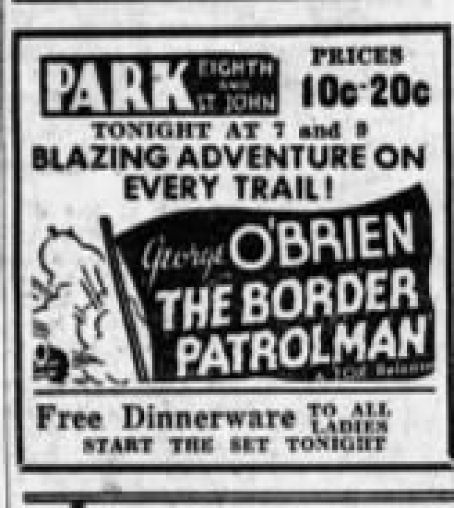
- Newspaper advertisement
- Directed by: David Howard
- Written by: Bennett Cohen (screenplay and story); Daniel Jarrett (screenplay and story)
- Produced by: Sol Lesser
- Starring: George O'Brien
- Cinematography: Frank B. Good
- Edited by: Robert O. Crandall
- Music by: George Lessner
- Distributed by: Twentieth Century Fox Film Corporation
- Release date: June 20, 1936
- Running time: 60 minutes
- Country: United States
- Language: English

The Border Patrolman is a 1936 American Western film directed by David Howard and starring George O'Brien.

== Plot ==
The full film

Spoiled socialite Patricia Huntley gets arrested by U.S. Border Patrol agent Bob Wallace in Arizona after meeting with jewel smuggler Courtney Haybrook four miles from the U.S.-Mexico border. She defiantly smokes, tears up the citation, and claims he manhandled her when taken to the station. However, when he quits after being forced to apologize to her she becomes guilty and convinces her wealthy grandfather Frank Adams to hire him at a new job.

At Bob's advice, Frank hires him as Pat's tutor, teaching her riding and swimming. They initially bond, but she becomes upset after learning of her grandfather's plan. She tries to get drunk to embarrass him, only to find that the hotel staff have been ordered by Bob not to serve her any more drinks. After Pat slaps Bob, he decides to quit and she decides to go south of the border to marry Courtney, who hides a valuable stolen necklace in her purse. At the last moment she decides not to marry Courtney and leaves with Pat. After they are captured, Bob rescues Pat again and they reconcile.

== Cast ==
- George O'Brien as Bob Wallace
- Polly Ann Young as Patricia Huntley
- Smiley Burnette as Chuck Owens
- LeRoy Mason as Courtney Haybrook
- Mary Doran as Myra
- Al Hill as Frank Adams
- William P. Carleton as Jeremiah Huntley
- Tom London as Johnson
- Frank Campeau as Capt. Stevens
- Charles Coleman as Collins, a Servant
- Fay McKenzie (uncredited)
- Lester Dorr as Garage Attendant (uncredited)
- Martin Garralaga as Carlos, the Cantina Proprietor (uncredited)
- Lloyd Ingraham as Man at Swimming Pool (uncredited)
- George MacQuarrie as Jim Riker (uncredited)
- Chris-Pin Martin as Mexican Giving Directions (uncredited)
- Gertrude Messinger as Telephone Operator (uncredited)
- Cyril Ring as Ed Hendricks (uncredited)
- John St. Polis as Manning (uncredited)
