= Peggy Shannon =

American actress (1907–1941)

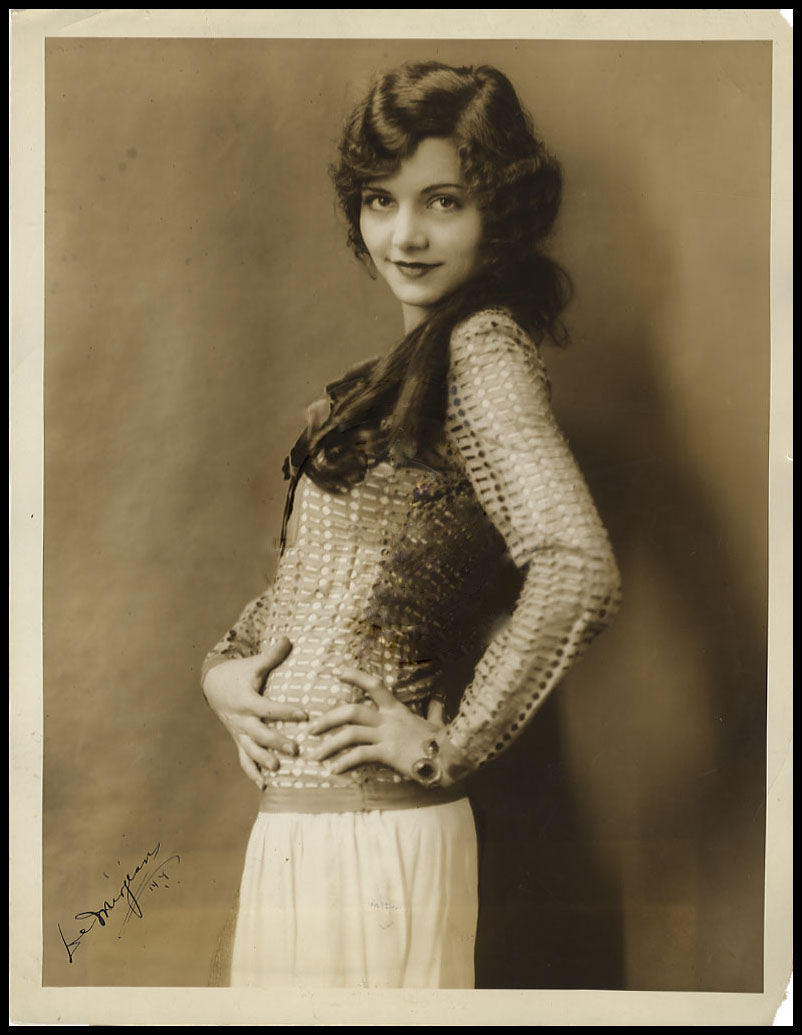
- Portrait of Shannon by John de Mirjian
- Born: Winona Sammon; January 10, 1907; Pine Bluff, Arkansas, U.S.
- Died: May 11, 1941 (aged 34); North Hollywood, Los Angeles, California, U.S.
- Resting place: Hollywood Forever Cemetery
- Occupation: Actress
- Years active: 1923–1940
- Spouses: Alan Davis (m. 1926; div. 1940) Albert G. Roberts (m. 1940)

Peggy Shannon (born Winona Sammon; January 10, 1907 – May 11, 1941) was an American actress. She appeared on the stage and screen of the 1920s and 1930s.

Shannon began her career as a Ziegfeld girl in 1923 before moving on to Broadway productions. She was signed to Paramount Pictures and groomed to replace Clara Bow as the newest "It girl", whom she replaced in the 1931 film, The Secret Call. Her growing dependency on alcohol eventually derailed her career. She appeared in her final film Triple Justice in 1940. In May 1941, Shannon died at the age of 34 from a heart attack, brought on by alcoholism. Her husband Albert G. Roberts shot himself three weeks after her death.

== Career ==
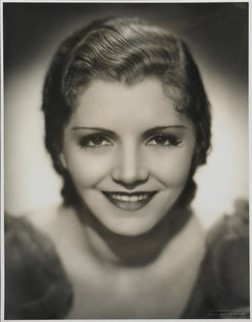
Shannon in 1930s

Shannon was born in Pine Bluff, Arkansas, in 1907 (some sources erroneously cite 1909 or 1910) to Edward and Nannie Sammon. She had a younger sister, Carol. She attended Annunciation Academy Catholic School and Pine Bluff High School and then was hired as a chorus girl by Florenz Ziegfeld while visiting her aunt in New York in 1923. The following year, she was cast in the Ziegfeld Follies followed by a role in Earl Carroll's Vanities. While on Broadway in 1927, she was spotted by B.P. Schulberg, production head of Paramount Pictures, and was offered a contract. When she arrived in Hollywood, she was hailed as the next "It girl", replacing Clara Bow. Before the shooting of The Secret Call, Bow had suffered a nervous breakdown, and Shannon was hired to replace her only two days after her arrival in Hollywood.

Shannon sometimes worked 16-hour days (from 10 a.m. to 4 a.m. the next day) while shooting a film, and when shooting wrapped, rushed to begin another film. She occasionally worked on two separate films in one day. Through films and publicity, Shannon became known as a fashion plate, wearing styles three months before they became popular. In 1932, she signed a new contract at Fox and became known as difficult and temperamental on the set and was rumored to have had a drinking problem. In 1934, Shannon returned to New York City to do the Broadway show, Page Miss Glory.

In 1935, she continued on Broadway with The Light Behind the Shadow, but was soon replaced, with a press release claiming a tooth infection, though rumors claimed it was her drinking. In 1936, she returned to Hollywood with Youth on Parole. She found it harder to conceal her drinking. Fewer movie roles were offered, and her drinking worsened. She made her last film appearance in the 1940 film Triple Justice, opposite George O'Brien.

== Personal life ==
In 1926, Shannon married actor Alan Davis. The marriage ended in July 1940. She married cameraman Albert G. Roberts later that year.

== Death ==
On May 11, 1941, Shannon's husband Albert Roberts and a fellow studio worker returned from a fishing trip to find Shannon dead in their North Hollywood apartment. She was slumped over the kitchen table, a cigarette in her mouth and an empty glass in her hand. She had been dead for approximately 12 hours. An autopsy revealed that she had died of a heart attack brought on by a liver ailment and a run-down condition.

She is interred at Hollywood Forever Cemetery. Three weeks after Shannon's death, her husband committed suicide by shooting himself with a .22 rifle in the same chair in which she had died. His suicide note read "I am very much in love with my wife, Peggy Shannon. In this spot she died, so in reverence to her, you will find me in the same spot."

== Broadway credits ==
Date	Production	Role
October 20, 1923 - May 10, 1924	Ziegfeld Follies of 1923	Performer
January 11 - March 19, 1927	Piggy	Performer
February 21 - May 1927	What Ann Brought Home	Alma
October 6 - Oct 1927	High Gear	Florence Ainslee
November 26 - December 1928	Back Here	Sally
August 5 - August 1929	Now-a-Days	Jean Wing
November 11 - December 1929	Cross Roads	Dora
December 30, 1929 – January 1930	Damn Your Honor	Michel Du Fresne
December 22, 1930 – Jan 1931	Life Is Like That	Jane Barton
March 11 – March 1931	Napi	La George
November 27, 1934 - March 1935	Page Miss Glory	Gladys Russell
February 10 - February 1936	Alice Takat	Kitty Linderman

== Filmography ==
Films
Year	Title	Role	Notes
1930	The Gob		Short film
1931	Opening Night		Short film
1931	The Meal Ticket	Friend	Short film
1931	The Secret Call	Wanda Kelly	
1931	Silence	Norma Davis/Norma Powers	
1931	The Road to Reno	Lee Millet	
1931	Touchdown	Mary Gehring	
1932	This Reckless Age	Mary Burke	
1932	Hotel Continental	Ruth Carleton	
1932	Society Girl	Judy Gelett	
1932	The Painted Woman	Kiddo	
1932	False Faces	Elsie Fryer	
1933	Girl Missing	Daisy Bradford	
1933	Deluge	Claire Arlington	
1933	Devil's Mate	Nancy Weaver	
1933	Turn Back the Clock	Elvina Evans Wright/Elvina Evans Gimlet	
1933	Fury of the Jungle	Joan Leesom	
1933	Back Page	Jerry Hampton	
1935	Night Life of the Gods	Daphne Lambert	
1935	Fighting Lady	Dora Hart	
1935	The Case of the Lucky Legs	Thelma Bell	
1936	The Man I Marry	Margot Potts	
1936	Ellis Island	Betty Parker	
1937	Romancing Along	Margot Potts	
1937	Youth on Parole	Peggy	
1938	Girls on Probation	Inmate Ruth	Uncredited
1939	Blackwell's Island	Pearl Murray	
1939	The Adventures of Jane Arden	Lola Martin	
1939	Fixer Dugan	Aggie Moreno	
1939	The Women	Mrs. Jones	Uncredited
1939	Dad for a Day	Mary Baker	
1939	The Amazing Mr. Williams	Kitty	Uncredited
1940	Cafe Hostess	Nellie	
1940	The House Across the Bay	Alice	
1940	All About Hash	Edith Henry	Short film
1940	Triple Justice	Susan	

== Footnotes ==
=== Sources ===
- Brettell, Andrew; Elder, Bruce; Imwold, Denise; Kennedy, Damien; King, Noel; Leonard, Warren Hsu; Miller, Toby; von Rohr, Heather (2006). Cut!: Hollywood Murders, Accidents, and Other Tragedies. Hauppauge, NY: Barrons Educational Series Publishing. ISBN 0-7641-5858-9.
- Donnelley, Paul (2003). Fade to black : a book of movie obituaries (2nd ed.). London: Omnibus. ISBN 0-7119-9512-5. OCLC 1280825683.
- Frasier, David K. (2005) [2002]. Suicide in the entertainment industry : an encyclopedia of 840 twentieth-century cases. Jefferson, N.C.: McFarland. ISBN 978-1-4766-0807-5. OCLC 921143397.
- Halliwell, Leslie; Walker, John (2003). Halliwell's who's who in the movies (3rd ed.). London: HarperCollins Entertainment. ISBN 0-00-715085-7.
- Liebman, Roy (2003). Vitaphone Films: A Catalogue of the Features and Shorts. McFarland, Incorporated, Publishers. ISBN 978-0-7864-4697-1.
- Springer, John; Hamilton, Jack D. (1974). They had faces then : super stars, stars, and starlets of the 1930's. Castle. ISBN 978-089009568-3. OCLC 1285856401.
- Soister, John T. (2004). Up from the vault : rare thrillers of the 1920s and 1930s. Jefferson, N.C.: McFarland Publishers. ISBN 0-7864-1745-5. OCLC 607451711.
- Starr, Jimmy (2001). Barefoot on barbed wire : an autobiography of a forty-year Hollywood balancing act. Lanham, Md.: Scarecrow Press. ISBN 0-8108-3941-5. OCLC 604065135.
