= Darcy O'Brien =

American writer

- Born: July 16, 1939; Los Angeles, California
- Died: March 2, 1998 (aged 58); Tulsa, Oklahoma
- Education: Princeton University; University of Cambridge; University of California, Berkeley
- Occupations: Author; literary critic; professor at the University of Tulsa
- Children: 1
- Parent(s): George O'Brien; Marguerite Churchill
- Relatives: Orin O'Brien (sister)

Darcy O'Brien (July 16, 1939 – March 2, 1998) was an American author of fiction and literary criticism, most well known for his work in the genre of true crime. His first novel, A Way of Life, Like Any Other, was a fictionalized account of his childhood in Hollywood. In 1985, he wrote a book about the Hillside Stranglers entitled Two of a Kind: The Hillside Stranglers, which was adapted into a made-for-television film called The Case of the Hillside Stranglers, starring Richard Crenna.

== Biography ==
Darcy O'Brien was born in Los Angeles, the son of Hollywood silent film actor George O'Brien and actress Marguerite Churchill, a frequent co-star of John Wayne. He attended Princeton University and University of Cambridge, and received a master's degree and doctorate from the University of California, Berkeley. From 1965 to 1978 he was a professor of English at Pomona College. In 1978 he moved to Tulsa, and taught at the University of Tulsa until 1995.

O'Brien was married three times. His daughter Molly O'Brien is a film producer and director. Molly won an Academy Award in 2025 for producing and directing The Only Girl in the Orchestra, which focused on Darcy's sister Orin O'Brien, a double bassist musician who was the first female member of the New York Philharmonic.

O'Brien died of a heart attack in Tulsa, Oklahoma on March 2, 1998, aged 58.

== Awards ==
- 1978: Ernest Hemingway Award for best first novel, A Way of Life, Like Any Other
- 1997: Edgar Allan Poe Award, Power to Hurt

O'Brien was inducted into the Oklahoma Writers Hall of Fame in 1997.

== Selected works ==
- A Way of Life, Like Any Other (1977 & 2001). New York: Norton. ISBN 978-0393087987. OCLC 3203215
- Moment by Moment, novelization of screenplay by Jane Wagner (1979)
- The Silver Spooner (1981)
- Two of a Kind: The Story of the Hillside Stranglers (1985)
- Murder in Little Egypt (1989)
- Margaret in Hollywood (1991)
- A Dark and Bloody Ground (1993)
- Power to Hurt (1996)
- The Hidden Pope (1998)
- The Conscience of James Joyce (2016)
