= Bullet Code =

1940 film by David Howard

- Directed by: David Howard
- Screenplay by: Doris Schroeder
- Story by: Bennett Cohen
- Produced by: Bert Gilroy
- Starring: George O'Brien; Virginia Vale; Slim Whitaker
- Cinematography: Harry Wild
- Edited by: Frederic Knudtson
- Music by: Paul Sawtell
- Production company: RKO Radio Pictures
- Release date: April 12, 1940
- Running time: 58 minutes
- Country: United States
- Language: English

Bullet Code is a 1940 American Western film directed by David Howard and starring George O'Brien, Virginia Vale and Slim Whitaker. The screenplay was written by Doris Schroeder from a story by Bennett Cohen.

== Plot ==
In the Old West, cowhand Bud Matthews, who works for rancher Steve Holden, is in cahoots with Cass Barton and his gang to rustle Holden's cattle. Matthews has a change of heart and tries to warn Holden and his cowhands of the ambush, but is shot during the melee. Steve thinks he shot Bud accidentally. Before he dies, Bud confesses his past to Steve and also the location of his family's ranch. Steve and his pal, Pop Norton, head toward the Matthews' ranch and meet John Matthews and his daughter, Molly. Banker Sam Gorman wants to buy out Matthews because the Matthews land is the only stretch along the Mexican border that is not regularly patrolled by the authorities (allowing for more frequent cattle rustling). Gorman has hired men to threaten Matthews' cowhands, causing them to quit. Hired as cowhands by the Matthews, Steve and Pop are invited to their ranch for dinner, but subdue a couple of Gorman's men attempting to ambush them along the way.

Cass Barton arrives and is hired by Gorman to infiltrate the Matthews ranch. Barton and Scar Atwood pose as drifters and are hired by Matthews as cowhands. Barton recognizes Steve from the earlier ambush. Barton discloses to Gorman that Steve is helping Matthews, and Gorman offers to pay Barton extra if he takes care of Steve too. Steve walks in on Barton making a pass at Molly and a fight ensues. Matthews arrives and as Steve is explaining what happened, Scar recognizes a photograph of Bud and tells the Matthews that Steve killed him. The Matthews dismiss Steve and Pop. Barton discloses to Scar that his bullet actually killed Bud.

Steve and Pop ride to Gorman's office and overhear the conversation Gorman has with Barton and Scar confirming their conspiracy against Matthews. Barton shoots Scar after Scar threatens to blackmail him over his shooting Bud. Though Scar's wounds are not fatal, the doctor tells him they are in order to extract a confession. Scar confesses to Steve, with the sheriff present, that Barton killed Bud during their unsuccessful ambush and that Gorman and Barton are in cahoots against the Matthews.

Gorman, with Barton and his gang in tow, tries to force Matthews to sell. Steve and Pop appear and convince the Matthews of Scar's confession. A gunfight ensues. The sheriff and his posse arrive and chase off the gang. In the melee, Barton shoots Pop. Steve pursues Barton and subdues him. Steve returns to the Matthews' ranch where Pop is recovering from his wounds. Pop hands a harmonica to John Matthews who begins playing Here Comes the Bride as Steve and Molly take a walk.

== Cast ==
- George O'Brien as Steve Holden
- Virginia Vale as Molly Matthews
- Slim Whitaker as Pop Norton
- Howard Hickman as John Matthews
- Harry Woods as Cass Barton
- William Haade as Scar Atwood
- Walter Miller as Sam Gorman
- Kirby Grant as Bud Matthews (as Robert Stanton)
- Spade Cooley as Fiddler (uncredited)
- Billy Franey as Old Bathing Gent (uncredited)
- Robert McKenzie as Doctor (uncredited)
