= Molly O'Brien (disambiguation) =

Molly O'Brien may refer to:

- Molly O'Brien, American film producer and director
- Molly O'Brien (Deep Space Nine), character from the Star Trek franchise
- Molly O'Brien (Alien vs. Predator), character from the Alien vs. Predator franchise

== See also ==
- Mollie O'Brien (born 1952), American bluegrass singer
