= Mystery Ranch (1932 film) =

1932 film

- Theatrical release poster
- Directed by: David Howard
- Screenplay by: Alfred A. Cohn
- Produced by: Sol M. Wurtzel
- Starring: George O'Brien; Cecilia Parker; Charles Middleton; Charles Stevens; Forrester Harvey; Noble Johnson
- Cinematography: Joseph H. August; George Schneiderman
- Edited by: Paul Weatherwax
- Music by: Hugo Friedhofer
- Production company: Fox Film Corporation
- Distributed by: Fox Film Corporation
- Release date: July 1, 1932
- Running time: 56 minutes
- Country: United States
- Language: English

Mystery Ranch is a 1932 American pre-Code Western film directed by David Howard and written by Alfred A. Cohn. The film stars George O'Brien, Cecilia Parker, Charles Middleton, Charles Stevens, Forrester Harvey and Noble Johnson. The film was released on July 1, 1932, by Fox Film Corporation.

== Cast ==
- George O'Brien as Bob Sanborn
- Cecilia Parker as Jane Emory
- Charles Middleton as Henry Steele
- Charles Stevens as Henchman Tonto
- Forrester Harvey as Artie Brower
- Noble Johnson as Henchman Mudo
- Roy Stewart as Buck Johnson
- Betty Francisco as Appetite Mae
- Russ Powell as Sheriff Bill Burnham
