= Painted Desert (1938 film) =

1938 film by David Howard

- Movie poster
- Directed by: David Howard
- Screenplay by: John Rathmell; Oliver Drake
- Story by: Jack Cunningham
- Produced by: Bert Gilroy
- Starring: George O'Brien; Laraine Johnson; Ray Whitley
- Cinematography: Harry Wild
- Edited by: Frederick Knudston
- Music by: Roy Webb
- Production company: RKO Pictures
- Distributed by: RKO Pictures
- Release date: August 12, 1938
- Running time: 59 minutes
- Country: United States
- Language: English

Painted Desert is a 1938 Western film directed by David Howard and starring George O'Brien and Laraine Day (billed as "Laraine Johnson"). The picture is a remake of 1931's The Painted Desert. The movie was partially filmed on location in Red Rock Canyon, a popular filming location during the 1930s and 1940s, with a multitude of B-Westerns being filmed there.

== Plot ==
Bob, a young rancher, buys a mine on his leased land to prevent the working of it. However, surveys show a valuable mineral deposit, so he and Carol, the granddaughter of the discoverer of the mine, who has been forced to sell it to a crook, start operations on it. Fawcett, the crook, schemes to get the mine back, but is outwitted at every turn and loses his life in the dynamiting which he inspired.

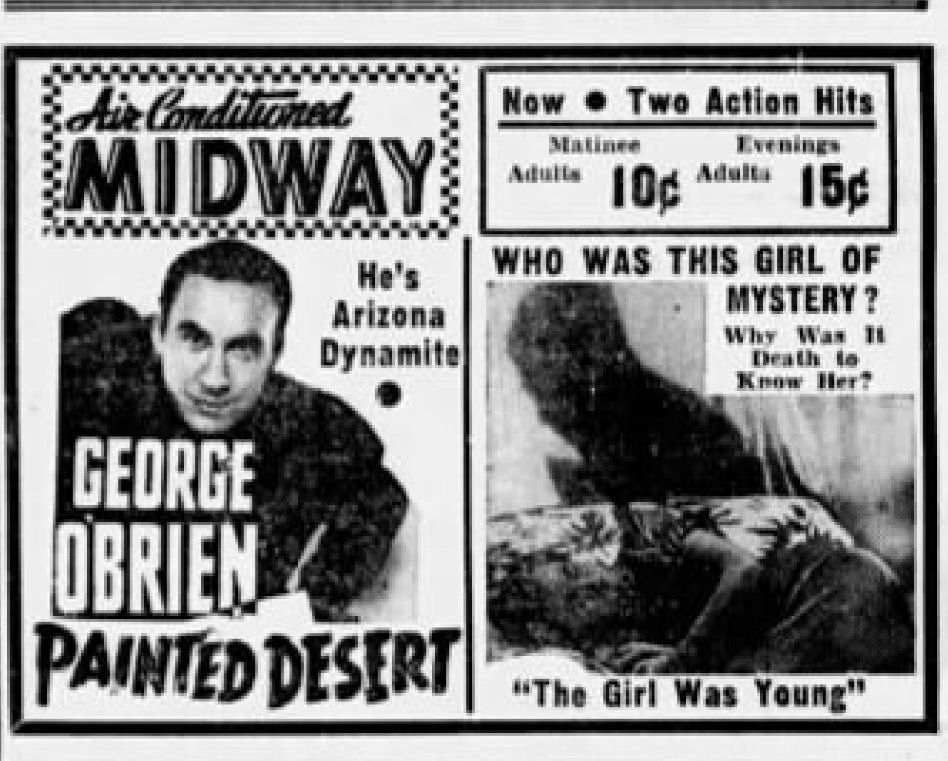
American advertisement for Painted Desert and Hitchcock film The Girl Was Young

== Cast ==
- George O'Brien: Bob McVey
- Laraine Day: Carol Banning (billed as Laraine Johnson)
- Ray Whitley: Steve
- Stanley Fields: Bill
- Maude Allen: Yukon Kate
- Fred Kohler: Hugh Fawcett (billed as Fred Kohler Sr.)
- Lloyd Ingraham: Charles M. Banning
- Harry Cording: Burke
- Max Wagner: Kincaid
- Lee Shumway: Bart Currie
- William V. Mong: Banker Heist
