= Back Page (film) =

- Directed by: Anton Lorenze
- Written by: F. McGrew Willis
- Starring: Peggy Shannon; Russell Hopton; Claude Gillingwater
- Cinematography: James S. Brown Jr.
- Edited by: Fred Bain
- Release date: November 7, 1933
- Running time: 65 minutes
- Country: USA
- Language: English

Back Page is an American 1933 drama film directed by Anton Lorenze and starring Peggy Shannon, Russell Hopton, and Claude Gillingwater.

== Plot ==
A former big city reporter becomes the editor of a small town newspaper.

== Cast ==
- Peggy Shannon as Jerry Hampton
- Russell Hopton as Brice Regal
- Claude Gillingwater as Sam Webster
- Edwin Maxwell as Martin Regal
- Sterling Holloway as Bill Giddings
- Rockliffe Fellowes as John Levings
- Richard Tucker as John H. Smith
- Bryant Washburn as Barman
