= The Marshal of Mesa City =

1939 film directed by David Howard

- Directed by: David Howard; Eddie Donahue (assistant)
- Screenplay by: Jack Lait Jr.
- Produced by: Bert Gilroy
- Starring: George O'Brien; Virginia Vale
- Cinematography: Harry Wild
- Edited by: Frederic Knudtson
- Music by: Paul Sawtell
- Production company: RKO Radio Pictures
- Release date: November 3, 1939
- Running time: 62 minutes
- Country: United States
- Language: English
- Budget: $75,000
- Box office: $180,000

The Marshal of Mesa City is a 1939 American Western film directed by David Howard from a screenplay by Jack Lait Jr..

Although no story credit was given, this film bears a striking similarity to the 1935 western, The Arizonian, whose screenplay and story were written by Academy Award winner Dudley Nichols, and some sources state that this film was a remake of the earlier picture. Both were produced and distributed by RKO Radio Pictures, and The Marshal of Mesa City was released on November 3, 1939. The film stars George O'Brien and Virginia Vale.

== Plot ==
In 1880, in Mesa City, Arizona, corrupt sheriff Jud Cronin and his cronies wreak havoc. School teacher Virginia King has had enough, including Cronin's advances, and decides to leave for good. Cronin's henchmen intercept her stagecoach, but retired lawman Cliff Mason foils their plans. Virginia identifies one of the gang as Pete Henderson. Because the stagecoach was damaged during the ambush, Cliff escorts Virginia back to Mesa City. Cliff reports the incident, but the mayor explains to him the futility of seeking justice through the corrupt sheriff, who has Henderson on his payroll. Henderson kills the marshal who tries to arrest him, and the rest of the gang assist with his escape. Exasperated, the mayor appoints Cliff as the new marshal. Cliff arrests and jails the remaining gang from the stagecoach ambush. At trial, the judge, also on Cronin's payroll, reduces the gang's charges to a misdemeanor and orders each to pay a small fine. Cliff is disgusted, turns in his badge, and plans to leave town.

Virginia persuades Cliff to stay for the town dance that evening, and he accepts conditioned upon escorting her. A jealous Cronin threatens Cliff at the dance, prompting Cliff to have the mayor reappoint him marshal. Cliff persuades the town to pass an ordinance banning the possession of firearms except for officers of the law. Cronin sends for notorious gunman Duke Allison to prod Cliff into a gunfight, but Cliff doesn't take the bait and saves Duke from being shot by another bar patron. Cronin leaves town (to meet Henderson) with instructions for his men to kill Cliff. Outnumbered in the bar, Cliff is aided by Duke, whose life he previously saved, and Cronin's gang is arrested. Once again, the corrupt judge only levies a small fine against them. Cliff makes Duke a deputy marshal so he can go armed. Duke tells Cliff that Cronin is leading a citizens' posse to find Henderson, but Cronin already knows his whereabouts and intends to lead the posse astray. Duke tells Cliff where Henderson is hiding.

Cliff arrests Henderson and turns him over to Cronin who is forced to jail him. Cronin tries to arrest Duke for being a "known killer," but Cliff intervenes and whips Cronin's henchman Bat Cardigan in a fist fight. During another town dance, Cronin releases Henderson, who waits with henchman Jake Morris outside the dance hall to kill both Cliff and Duke. As the pair exit, Cliff outdraws and kills Henderson. Morris reports the incident to Cronin, who arrests Cliff and Duke for Henderson's murder. The mayor promises Cronin he will have the U.S. Attorney investigate his corruption. Cronin starts a fire at the jail intending to not only destroy evidence of his corruption, but also kill Cliff and Duke in the process. Cliff breaks out of the blazing jail with the help of the townspeople, and he and Duke engage Cronin and his henchmen in a gunfight. All of the gang are killed, and a mortally wounded Duke saves Cliff's life by killing Cronin.

The mayor, Cliff and Virginia pay their respects to Duke at his gravesite. Cliff tells the mayor he no longer wants to be a lawman and will head south. Virginia asks to accompany him, and they leave together.

== Cast ==
- George O'Brien as Cliff Mason
- Virginia Vale as Virginia King
- Leon Ames as Sheriff Jud Cronin
- Henry Brandon as Duke Allison
- Harry Cording as Henchman Bat Cardigan
- Lloyd Ingraham as Mayor Sam Bentley
- Slim Whitaker as Henchman Jake Morris
- Joe McGuinn as Henchman Pete Henderson
- Mary Gordon as Mrs. Dudley
- Frank Ellis as Henchman Slim
