= The Earth Woman =

1926 film

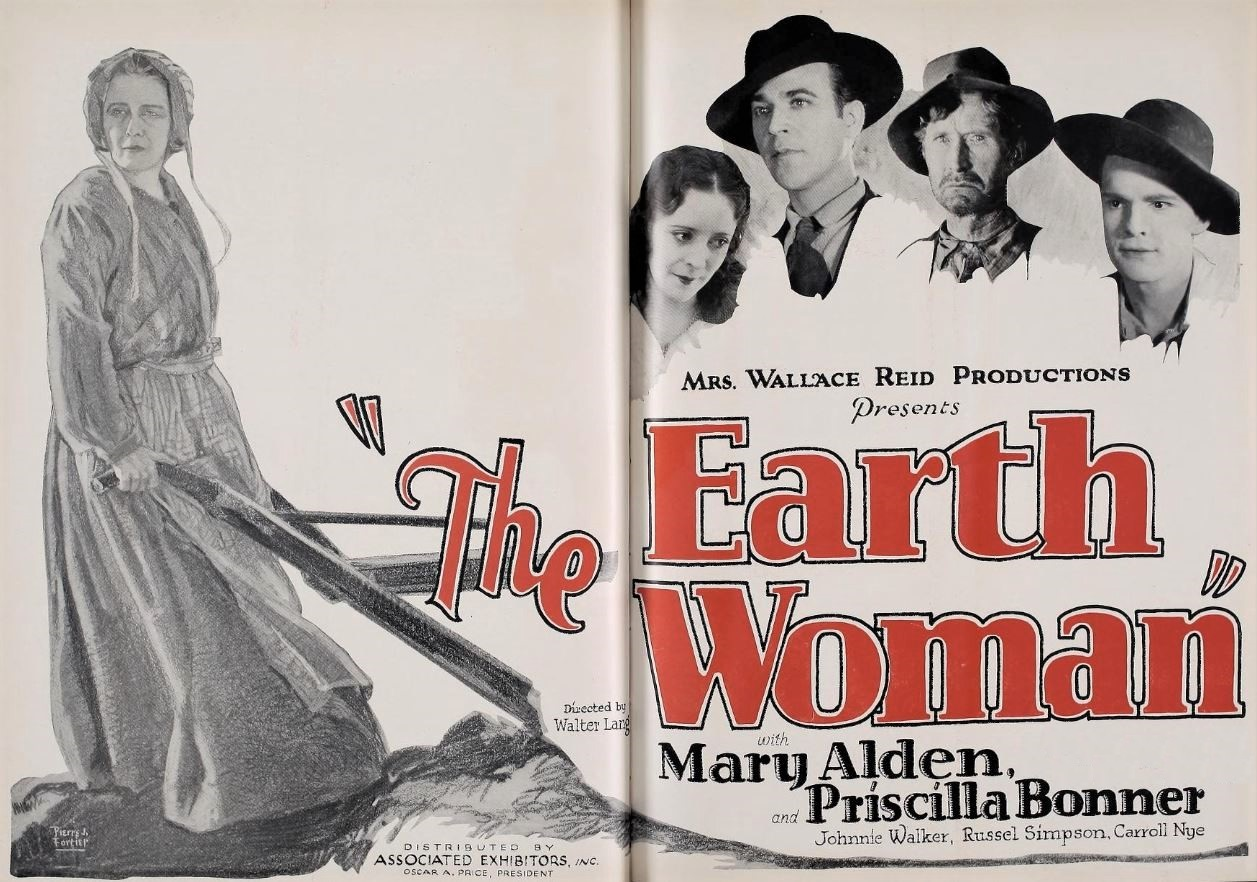
- Advertisement
- Directed by: Walter Lang
- Written by: Norton S. Parker
- Produced by: Dorothy Davenport
- Starring: Mary Alden
- Cinematography: Milton Moore
- Edited by: Mrs. Wallace Reid Productions
- Distributed by: Associated Exhibitors
- Release date: April 4, 1926
- Running time: 70 minutes
- Country: United States
- Language: Silent (English intertitles)

The Earth Woman is a 1926 American silent drama film directed by Walter Lang.

== Cast ==
- Mary Alden as Martha Tilden (The Earth Woman)
- Priscilla Bonner as Sally
- Russell Simpson as Ezra Tilden
- Carroll Nye as Steve Tilden
- Joe Butterworth as Joe Tilden
- John Carr as Simon
- Johnnie Walker as John Mason (credited as Johnny Walker)
- William Scott as Mark McWade

== Preservation ==
A print of this film was located in April 2021 in a film archive.
