= Fighting Lady =

1935 film directed by Carlos F. Borcosque

- Directed by: Carlos F. Borcosque
- Written by: Robert Ober; Jack Natteford
- Produced by: Fanchon Royer
- Starring: Peggy Shannon; Jack Mulhall; Marion Lessing
- Cinematography: James Diamond
- Edited by: Edward Schroeder
- Music by: Lee Zahler
- Production company: Fanchon Royer Pictures
- Distributed by: Majestic Pictures
- Release date: April 16, 1935
- Running time: 50 minutes
- Country: United States
- Language: English

Fighting Lady is a 1935 American drama film directed by Carlos F. Borcosque and starring Peggy Shannon, Jack Mulhall and Marion Lessing. The film was a low-budget Poverty Row production, distributed in some regions by Majestic Pictures.

== Plot ==
An ambitious secretary attempts to climb the social ladder by seducing a string of men.

== Cast ==
- Peggy Shannon as Dora Hart
- Jack Mulhall as George Davis
- Marion Lessing as Sally Newton
- Mary Carr as Mrs. Davis
- Edward Woods as Jimmie Hanford
- Edward Earle as Eugene 'Breck' Breckenridge
- Eddie Blythe as Mrs. Hanford
- Alice Moore as Betty Davis
- David Hitchcock as Daniel Mason
- John David Horsley as Arthur Sinclair

== Bibliography ==
- Pitts, Michael R. Poverty Row Studios, 1929–1940: An Illustrated History of 55 Independent Film Companies, with a Filmography for Each. McFarland & Company, 2005.
