= Shed No Tears (1948 film) =

1948 film by Jean Yarbrough

- Theatrical release poster
- Directed by: Jean Yarbrough
- Written by: Brown Holmes; Virginia M. Cooke
- Based on: Shed No Tears by Don Martin
- Produced by: Robert Frost
- Starring: Wallace Ford; June Vincent
- Cinematography: Frank Redman
- Edited by: Norman A. Cerf
- Music by: Raoul Kraushaar
- Production company: Frost Film Productions
- Distributed by: Eagle-Lion Films
- Release date: July 9, 1948 (United States)
- Running time: 70 minutes
- Country: United States
- Language: English

Shed No Tears is a 1948 American film noir directed by Jean Yarbrough and starring Wallace Ford and June Vincent.

== Plot ==
At the instigation of his wife Edna, used car salesman Sam Grover devises a scheme to collect on his $50,000 life insurance policy. After hurling a flaming unidentifiable corpse from the window of a burning hotel room registered in his name, Sam disguises himself and hides out in Washington, D.C. to await Edna.

Edna is to identify the corpse, which was wearing Sam's ring and wristwatch, and collect the insurance money. However, Tom, Sam's son by a prior marriage, hires a private detective, Huntington Stewart, to find out if his father's death was really an accident or if his stepmother murdered him. Stewart tricks Edna into disclosing that Sam is alive and blackmails her while stalling Tom. Edna, who had never intended to share the money with Sam, is in love with a young wastrel, Ray Belden, with whom she plans to leave the country. Sam returns and overhears Edna's plans, follows Belden and kills him. Tom, who has been following his father without recognizing him, hears the shots and reports to Stewart, who realizes that Sam has returned but does not tell Tom. Instead, he traces Sam and blackmails him too.

When Belden's body is discovered, police detective Hutton arrests Edna on suspicion of murder. She is released on bail and follows Stewart to Sam's hideout. Meanwhile, Tom, still unaware that his father is alive, receives $5,000 that Sam has sent him, Tom assumes that the money is a bribe from the real killer and goes to the police. The police follow Edna to Sam and when she learns that he killed Belden, she shoots him but falls to her death from the hotel window while struggling with Stewart. The police arrest Stewart and although Tom is remorseful at having enabled them to discover his father's crime, Sam tells him that he would rather pay the law's penalty than continue being blackmailed by Stewart.

== Cast ==
- Wallace Ford as Sam Grover
- June Vincent as Edna Grover
- Mark Roberts as Ray Belden
- Frank Albertson as Lt. Hutton
- Richard Hogan as Tom Grover, Sam's son
- Elena Verdugo as Marilyn
- Johnstone White as Huntington Stewart
