= Prison Break (film) =

1938 film by Arthur Lubin

- Movie poster
- Directed by: Arthur Lubin
- Screenplay by: Norton S. Parker; Dorothy Reid
- Story by: Norton S. Parker (original story by)
- Produced by: Paul Malvern (associate producer)
- Starring: Barton MacLane; Glenda Farrell; Paul Hurst; Constance Moore
- Cinematography: Harry Neumann A.S.C.
- Edited by: Jack Ogilvie
- Music by: Frank Sanucci; Hayes Pagel
- Production company: A Trem Carr Production
- Distributed by: Universal Pictures Company, Inc.
- Release date: July 12, 1938 (United States)
- Running time: 72 minutes
- Country: United States
- Language: English

Prison Break is a 1938 American crime-drama film directed by Arthur Lubin and starring Barton MacLane, Glenda Farrell and Paul Hurst. The film was based on the story "Walls of San Quentin" by Norton S. Parker. It was released by Universal Pictures on July 12, 1938.

A fisherman confesses to a murder he didn't commit to protect a friend. Determined to keep out of trouble in prison, but another convict makes things difficult for him.

== Plot ==
Joaquin Shannon, a fisherman, takes the blame for a crime to protect his brother-in-law Chris Nelson, whom he thinks accidentally killed the odious Joe Fenderson in a drunken brawl, but who really died from injuries from a mugging. He is sentenced to 10 years in prison for the crime. Joaquin asks Joe's sister and his girlfriend Jean Fenderson to wait for him, expecting to be paroled in one year for good behavior. However, in prison, he battles with Red Kincaid, who was the mugger responsible for killing Joe. Joaquin's repeat altercation with Red causes him to fail his parole examination and his prison sentences are lengthened. Later, when Joaquin helps to stop a prison break which was led by Red, he is immediately released from prison.

Joaquin reunites with Jean. However, because of his criminal record and prison sentence, he is shunned and dismissed by employers. In a bar, he meets Soapy a fellow ex-convict. Soapy convinces Joaquin to smuggle someone out of the country, who is actually Red and has escaped from prison. When Red and Soapy show up at the boat, they force Joaquin to navigate the boat. A dying Soapy who was shot by the police tells Jean that Red killed her brother. After finding out the truth, Joaquin fights Red and knocks him out so he can be delivered to the police, hopeful his name will be cleared in the process.

== Cast ==
- Barton MacLane as Joaquin Shannon
- Glenda Farrell as Jean
- Paul Hurst as Soapy
- Constance Moore as Maria Shannon
- Edward Pawley as Joe Fenderson
- Edmund MacDonald as Chris
- Ward Bond as Red Kincaid
- Guy Usher as The Warden
- Victor Kilian as Fenderson
- Frank Darian as Cappy
- George Cleveland as Ding
- John Russell as Jackie
- Thomas Louden as Priest
- Paul Everton as Judge

== Production ==
Glenda Farrell and Barton MacLane became popular co-starring in the Warner Bros.' Torchy Blane film series. The movie, Prison Break, were supposed to be the first film in a four-picture deal and dual contract with Farrell and MacLane. However, they made no other films at the Universal Pictures again with each other. Arthur Lubin became attached to direct on 12 April with Trem Carr with whom he had made several movies to produce. He supervised the writing of the script at Victorville.

The movie's working titles were "State Prison", "Prison Walls" and "Walls of San Quentin".

Filming started 16 May 1938 under the title Walls of San Quentin. Later in May the title was changed to State Prison as it was felt "San Quentin" had already been used in a title for a film with MacLane. The title would be changed again.

== Reception ==
Frank S. Nugent of The New York Times writes:

Unlike most of our modestly-budgeted melodramas dealing with the parole system, "Prison Break"... omits the jubilant finale in which the boss-racketeer controlling the parole board is exposed and the warden-in-cahoots is sent further up the river. In point of stricter fact, Universal's little treatise has omitted both the racketeer and the corrupt warden, and adheres throughout to its pessimistic view of parole. Although we hesitate to damn a film producer, in these cautious days, with the epithet "crusader," we really distrust Universal of having expressed an opinion. Is there a picket in the audience? The trouble with prisons, the picture says, is that they're full of such unpleasant people. When you take an honest, non-criminal soul like Barton MacLane's tuna fisherman, Joaquin Shannon, and pen him up with hardened offenders of the Red Kincaid type you are either going to have him turn criminal himself or get a bad name with the keepers for punching Mr. Bond in the jaw. Then there are a few notorious inconsistencies about parole itself: the denial of the right to marry, which deprives Mr. MacLane of the benefits of Glenda Farrell's society; and the stern rule about letting even a paroled tuna fisherman go beyond the jurisdictional 12-mile limit. Mr. MacLane really exercises more restraint than we would expect any one of so Irish a face to show, but he does lose his temper at last, just before the scriptwriters relent and decide to clear up the mystery of the murdered Joe Fenderson. By that time you probably will be as confused about it as we were — not knowing whether to relax and take it as just another moderately good Class B melodrama, or to muster your indignation over the seemingly iniquitous parole system. In either case, it's not a bad show at all."

The Los Angeles Times said the film had "originality" and "marked dramatic interest".

Diabolique magazine called it "a Warner Bros-style innocent-man-accused-of-crime-goes-to-prison tale... like most of Lubin’s movies from this time it is stacked to the brim with plot, and the director punches it through."

== Home media ==
Prison Break was released on DVD on May 14, 2007.
