= Norton S. Parker =

American screenwriter

- Born: November 19, 1900; Indianapolis, Indiana, USA
- Died: July 5, 1969 (aged 68); New York, New York, USA
- Education: Billings Polytechnic
- Occupation(s): Screenwriter, director

Norton S. Parker (also known as Norton S. Good) was an American screenwriter and director known for penning exploitation films and Westerns during the 1920s, 1930s, and 1940s.

== Biography ==
Norton was raised in Montana, and he attended Billings Polytechnic; afterward began a career as a journalist, working at The Stillwater County Democrat and The Columbus News. He later moved to Hollywood and began writing screenplays and directing films.

Parker was a friend of cartoonist E.C. Segar, the creator of Popeye. In 1929, Segar and began work on The Sea Hag, a prose novel intended for adult readers. The Sea Hag would have featured both Popeye and the titular villainess, the Sea Hag, as characters. King Features Syndicate refused to grant Segar and Parker permission to put The Sea Hag into print, and the novel was never published.

His marriage to his first wife, Viola, ended in 1940; a year later, he married writer Kallie Foutz in Yuma, Arizona. The pair had a daughter, Patricia, who became a model. Later in his career, he became chief of the writing division at the Army Pictorial Center; he was decorated by the Army in 1966 for his work on the television series The Army in Action.

== Selected filmography ==
As director:

- The Pace That Kills (1928)
- The Road to Ruin (1928)
- Street of Forgotten Women (1927)

As writer:

- Devil's Canyon (1953)
- Arctic Fury (1949)
- South of Santa Fe (1949)
- Rio Grande Raiders (1946)
- Fighting Frontier (1943)
- Come on Danger (1942)
- The Bandit Trail (1941)
- Six-Gun Gold (1941)
- Cyclone on Horseback (1941)
- In Old Colorado (1941)
- Three Men from Texas (1940)
- Young Bill Hickok (1940)
- Stage to Chino (1940)
- Sky Patrol (1939)
- Prison Break (1938)
- Outlaw Express (1938)
- Western Trails (1938)
- The Last Stand (1938)
- Border Wolves (1938)
- Courage of the West (1937)
- Tundra (1936)
- Sinister Hands (1932)
- Hell's Headquarters (1932)
- Ten Nights in a Bar-Room (1931)
- Hellship Bronson (1928)
- The Road to Ruin (1928)
- Roarin' Broncs (1927)
- The Earth Woman (1926)
- The Lady from Hell (1926)
