= The Secret Call =

1931 film by Stuart Walker

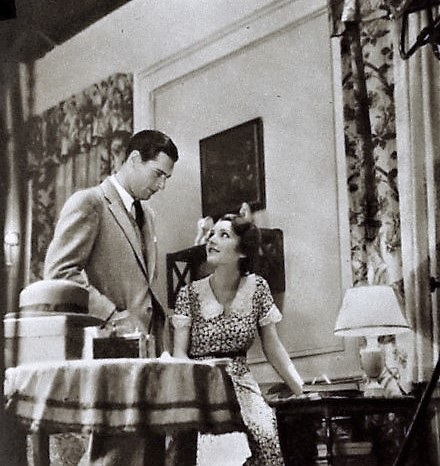
- Still with Richard Arlen and Peggy Shannon
- Directed by: Stuart Walker
- Screenplay by: Arthur Kober; Eve Unsell; William C. deMille
- Starring: Richard Arlen; Peggy Shannon; William B. Davidson; Charles Trowbridge; Jane Keithley; Selmer Jackson; Ned Sparks
- Cinematography: David Abel
- Music by: Rudolph G. Kopp
- Production company: Paramount Pictures
- Distributed by: Paramount Pictures
- Release date: July 25, 1931
- Running time: 70 minutes
- Country: United States
- Language: English

The Secret Call is a 1931 American drama film directed by Stuart Walker and written by Arthur Kober, Eve Unsell and William C. deMille. The film stars Richard Arlen, Peggy Shannon, William B. Davidson, Charles Trowbridge, Jane Keithley, Selmer Jackson, and Ned Sparks. The film was released on July 25, 1931, by Paramount Pictures.

== Cast ==
- Richard Arlen as Tom Blake
- Peggy Shannon as Wanda Kelly
- William B. Davidson as Jim Blake
- Charles Trowbridge as Phil Roberts
- Jane Keithley as Grace Roberts
- Selmer Jackson as Matt Stanton
- Ned Sparks as Bert Benedict
- Jed Prouty as Jim Neligan
- Charles D. Brown as Bob Barnes
- Harry Beresford as Frank Kelly
- Larry Steers as Fillmore
- Elaine Baker as Vera Lorraine
- Frances Moffett as Gwen Allen
- Claire Dodd as Maisie
- Patricia Farr as Ellen
