= Molly O'Brien =

American producer and director

Molly O'Brien is an American film producer and director, and head of documentary at NBC News Studios.

She is best known for producing and directing The Only Girl in the Orchestra, which won Best Documentary Short Film at the 97th Academy Awards.

== Personal life ==
O'Brien is the niece of Orin O'Brien, a double bassist who became the New York Philharmonic's first female musician in 1966 after she was hired by Leonard Bernstein. O'Brien explored her aunt's cultural impact and legacy in The Only Girl in the Orchestra.

Her father was Darcy O'Brien, an author of fiction and literary criticism.

== Career ==
O'Brien is head of documentary at NBC News Studios. Before that, she was an executive producer at Fork Films in New York City, and a founding producer of the Catalyst Initiative at the Sundance Institute in Los Angeles.

In 2023, O'Brien produced and directed The Only Girl in the Orchestra. Its world premiere was on November 9, 2023 at Doc NYC. It became available for streaming on December 4, 2024, on Netflix.
