= Robbers of the Range =

1941 film by Edward Killy

- Theatrical release poster
- Directed by: Edward Killy
- Written by: Oliver Drake
- Screenplay by: Morton Grant; Arthur V. Jones
- Produced by: Bert Gilroy
- Starring: Tim Holt; Virginia Vale; Ray Whitley
- Cinematography: Harry J. Wild
- Edited by: Frederic Knudtson
- Music by: Paul Sawtell
- Production company: RKO Radio Pictures
- Distributed by: RKO Radio Pictures
- Release date: April 18, 1941
- Running time: 61 minutes
- Country: United States
- Language: English

Robbers of the Range is a 1941 American Western film directed by Edward Killy and starring Tim Holt, Virginia Vale, Ray Whitley and Emmett Lynn. It was the third in Tim Holt's series of Westerns for RKO Pictures. Holt fractured two bones in his foot in an accident during filming.

== Plot ==
In the Old West, a land agent named Greeley is in cahoots with railroad purchasing agent, J.R. Rankin, to buy up land in anticipation of the coming railroad. Rancher Jim Drummond refuses to sell. Rankin and Greeley, with henchmen Monk and Blackie, frame Jim for the murder of fellow rancher, Williams. Jim is arrested and taken by stage to the town of Blue Mesa for trial. Rankin's men attack the stage killing the driver, the deputy sheriff escorting Jim, along with a young gunman named Curly Yantis. Jim drives the stage to Blue Mesa and reports the attack posing as Yantis, declaring that Jim Drummond (Yantis) was killed. Jim's ranch hands, Smokey and Whopper arrive, and Jim explains what transpired.

Roy Tremaine heads a protective association of ranchers. In order to expose Rankin's criminal activity, Jim joins his gang and his pals agree to work for the ranchers. They help Tremaine raise the funds needed to save his ranch. Jim is attracted to Tremaine's daughter, Alice; but she rebuffs him due to his association with Rankin. Monk and Greeley frame Tremaine for the murder of rancher Frank Higgins. Jim and his friends hold Greeley and Monk, hoping to use them to exonerate Tremaine. Jim also finds the gun Monk used to kill Higgins in Tremaine's well. Monk escapes and reveals Jim's true identity to Rankin. Rankin's gang guard the town to prevent Jim from introducing the new evidence at trial. To Rankin's surprise, railroad executive Colonel Lodge arrives to investigate the situation. The rigged jury finds Tremaine guilty, but Jim arrives with Greeley and the evidence absolving Tremaine. Rankin realizes his plot has been uncovered and prevents everyone from leaving the courthouse while he and his gang take off with their ill-gained money. Jim and the other ranchers intervene, a gunfight ensues and the crooks are captured. Lodge promises to make things right with the ranchers. Alice reconciles with Jim. Whopper accidentally falls in Tremaine's well as he admires Alice's beauty.

== Cast ==
- Tim Holt as Curly Yantis
- Virginia Vale as Alice Tremaine
- Ray Whitley as Smokey
- Emmett Lynn as Whopper
- LeRoy Mason as J.R. Rankin
- Howard C. Hickman as Roy Tremaine
- Ernie Adams as Greeley
- Frank LaRue as Frank Higgins
- Ray Bennett as Sam Daggett
- Tom London as Henchman Monk Saunders
- Ed Cassidy as Sheriff
- Bud Osborne as Henchman Blackie
- George Melford as Colonel Lodge
- Malcolm 'Bud' McTaggart as Curly Yantis
- Harry Harvey Sr. as Deputy Sheriff Bill Brady
