= Street of Forgotten Women =

1927 film

- Directed by: Norton S. Parker
- Production company: Kayanay Productions
- Distributed by: States rights
- Release date: August 18, 1927
- Running time: 53 minutes
- Country: United States
- Language: Silent (English intertitles)

Street of Forgotten Women is a 1927 American silent exploitation film directed by Norton S. Parker about a young woman who becomes a prostitute. Like many exploitation films, it casts itself as performing a public service by educating the public and warning families of the dangers facing young women in large cities. It was distributed through independent film exchanges directly to local theaters. The names of the actors in the cast are not known.

== Plot ==
The film is supposedly the true story of Grace Fleming, a debutante who ignores the advice of her father and is encouraged by a theater manager to risk all her money on a stage production that fails. Too ashamed to return home, she tries to get work in a theater, is sexually assaulted by the theater manager, loses her job and becomes homeless. She ends up in a brothel located in a building owned by her father. Grace is later rescued by a social reformer, and her father has the police close the brothel and arrest the prostitutes and the theater manager.

While the plot reflects a public sentiment in holding that the theater is "a haven for scarlet women and immoral men," it was an improvement over the white slavery films of prior years in allowing a fallen, violated woman to be rescued at its conclusion.

== Reception ==
The film proved to be controversial, and was distributed via state's rights by independent film exchanges. After the film was shown in San Diego, the Motion Picture Theater Owners of America cited Street of Forgotten Women as an example of a film that should not be shown lest the reaction of the public lead to calls for film censorship. In 1928 the owner and an employee at the Bijou Theater in Denver, Colorado, were fined a total of $200 on a charge of "exhibiting a picture detrimental to public morals" when children were discovered to have been admitted, where advertisements had stated that the film would be shown to segregated audiences with minors banned.

== Preservation ==
Prints of Street of Forgotten Women are in the collections of the Library of Congress, UCLA Film & Television Archive, and Cineteca Del Friuli (Germona).
