= One Crowded Night =

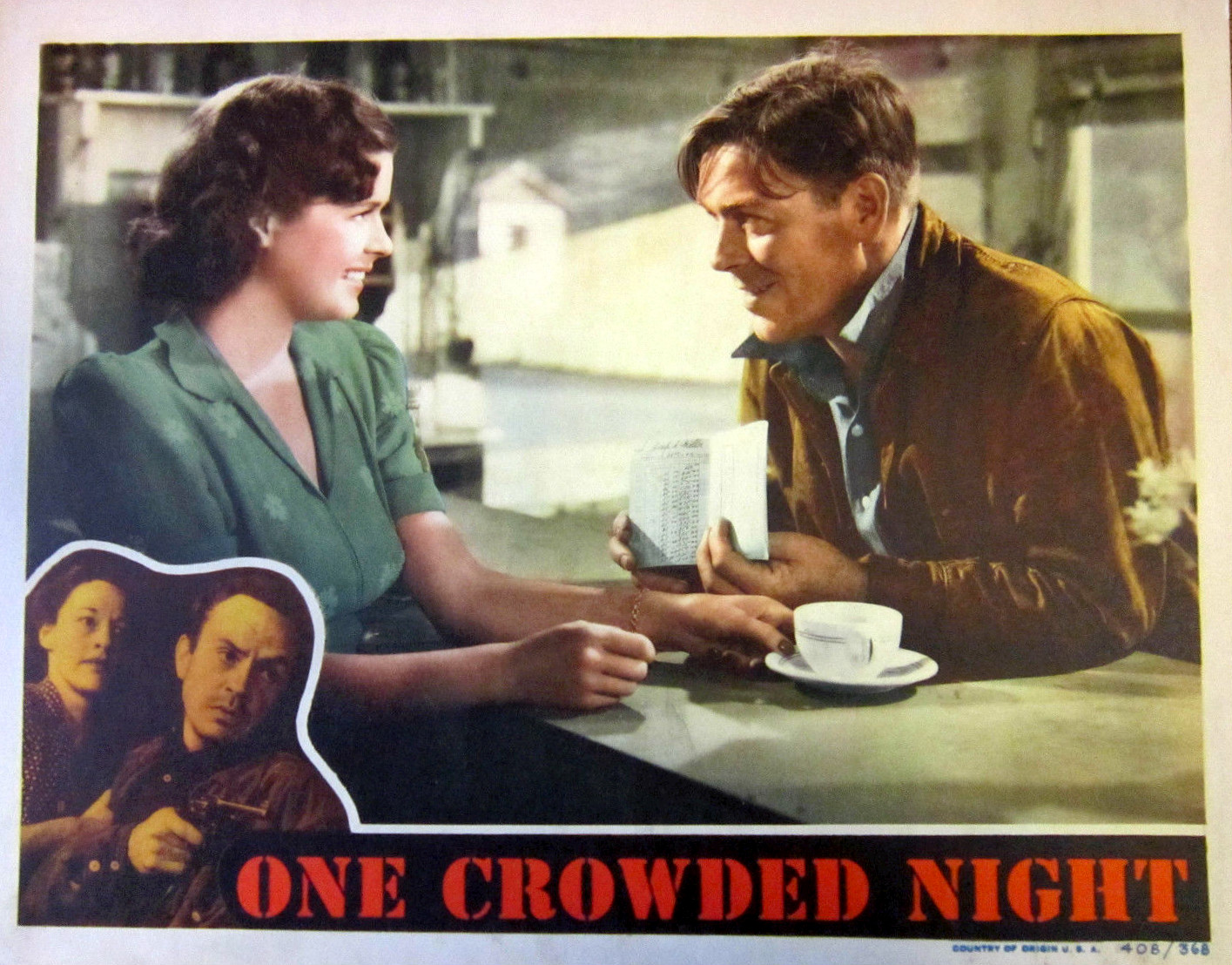
- Lobby card
- Directed by: Irving Reis
- Written by: Richard J. Collins; Arnaud d'Usseau
- Based on: story by Ben Holmes
- Produced by: Cliff Reid
- Starring: Billie Seward; William Haade; Charles Lang; Adele Pearce; J.M. Kerrigan; Paul Guilfoyle; Anne Revere; Gale Storm; Dick Hogan
- Cinematography: J. Roy Hunt
- Edited by: Theron Warth
- Production company: RKO Radio Pictures
- Distributed by: RKO Radio Pictures
- Release date: August 9, 1940
- Running time: 66 minutes
- Country: United States
- Language: English

One Crowded Night is a 1940 drama film directed by Irving Reis.

== Plot ==
In a motor court in the Mojave Desert we are introduced to the Matthews consisting of Mae, the wife of a convict, Annie, her sister, Ma and Pa, their parents, and Mae's young son Bobby. They used to live in Duluth but moved after Mae's husband, Jim, was jailed for manslaughter. Now, Mae and Annie work at the diner while Ma and Pa work the tourist lodging. Annie hates the town and cannot wait to go back to Duluth, much to the dismay of her local admirer, Vince Sanders, the gas station attendant. Next we meet Gladys, another diner waitress, who is engaged to Joe Miller, a truck driver. She is lodging with a traveller named Ruth Matson, who began having contractions while at the rest stop, and had no choice but to stay until the birth of her child. Through her pain, she calls out the name of her husband, "Fred", whose location is unknown.

Mae receives a letter that Jim will be receiving parole, though the joy is short lived as Jim arrives at the rest stop in person - he has broken out of prison, his parole is now void, and Mae now has no choice but to hide him. At the same time, Pa lodges a man named Brother 'Doc' Joseph, a medicine peddler, who offers Pa his wares in lieu of payment. In reality, the medicine is a scam and 'Doc' is a drunk conman.

Three more travellers arrive into town - two detectives and a man named Fred Matson, who is being escorted to San Diego by the detectives for deserting the Navy. Shortly thereafter, two more men arrive - Lefty and Mat Denlen - gunmen on the hunt for Jim Andrews. As Gladys enters the gunmen's room to change the towels, Lefty confronts her with the knowledge she is living under a fake identity and threatens to blackmail her if she does not help them find Jim. She agrees to help, though she is lying.

That night, Detective Lt. McDermott informs Pa that 'Doc' is a known drunk who lost his job as a doctor. However, with Ruth due to give birth, 'Doc' is the only hope she has for a safe delivery. Gladys is called to the gunmen's cabin, but as she walks in she is noticed by Bobby who cries to her about the "strange man" in his house. Lefty realizes he is referring to Jim and sends Bobby away, turning to kill Gladys for lying to them. At that moment, Joe arrives to pick up Gladys for their wedding ceremony and Lefty tells her if she can't send him away, they will both be killed. She succeeds in sending him away, but on her way back to the gunmen's cabin she instead runs into the detectives' cabin at the last second. A shootout begins between Jim, the detectives, and the gunmen, that concludes with Lefty and Mat being killed and Jim surrendering to the detectives.

Jim explains that Lefty and Mat had framed him for the murder he was sent to jail for and his name is cleared. Fred hears the sounds of his wife and reunites with her, neither realizing the other had been there the whole time. Thanks to 'Doc', their baby was successfully delivered. Detective Lt. McDermott suggests that Gladys skip town to avoid the backlash of her true identity being revealed, but Joe stops her. He heard the story on the radio and wishes to marry her anyway, and she agrees. Vince and Annie decide to start a relationship, and the film ends with 'Doc' leaving town, having just poured his "medicine" in his gas tank.

== Cast ==
- Billie Seward as Gladys
- William Haade as Joe Miller
- Charles Lang as Fred Matson
- Adele Pearce as Ruth Matson
- J.M. Kerrigan as Brother "Doc" Joseph
- Paul Guilfoyle as Jim Andrews
- Anne Revere as Mae Andrews
- Gale Storm as Annie Mathews
- Dick Hogan as Vince Sanders
- George Watts as Pa Mathews
- Emma Dunn as Ma Mathews
- Don Costello as Lefty
- Gaylord Pendleton as Mat Denlen
- Casey Johnson as Bobby Andrews
- Harry Shannon as Detective Lt. McDermott
