= Annapolis Salute =

1937 film by Christy Cabanne

- Directed by: Christy Cabanne
- Written by: John Twist; Christy Cabanne
- Produced by: Samuel J. Briskin; Robert Sisk
- Starring: James Ellison; Marsha Hunt; Harry Carey; Van Heflin
- Cinematography: Russell Metty
- Edited by: Ted Cheesman
- Production company: RKO Radio Pictures
- Distributed by: RKO Radio Pictures
- Release date: September 10, 1937
- Running time: 65 minutes
- Country: United States
- Language: English
- Box office: $272,000

Annapolis Salute is a 1937 drama film directed by Christy Cabanne and starring James Ellison, Marsha Hunt and Harry Carey. It was produced and distributed by RKO Pictures. A few scenes were shot at William Paca House in Maryland.

== Plot ==
The film charts the progress of three cadets from very different backgrounds at the United States Naval Academy in Annapolis. First they fight about the Academy’s traditions & then the sister of their hapless roommate. It all ends well with the semi-fat head seeing things as they should be. Fade Out to sea.

== Cast ==
- James Ellison as Bill J. Martin
- Marsha Hunt as Julia Clemens
- Harry Carey as Chief Martin
- Van Heflin as Clay V. Parker
- Ann Hovey as Bunny Oliver
- Arthur Lake as Cuthbert A. "Tex" Clemens
- Dick Hogan as Bob D. Wilson
- Marilyn Vernon as Mary Lou
- John Griggs as Dwight Moore

(cast list as per AFI database)
