= South of Panama (1941 film) =

1941 film by Jean Yarbrough

- Theatrical release poster
- Directed by: Jean Yarbrough
- Screenplay by: Ben Roberts; Sidney Sheldon
- Story by: Ben Roberts; Sidney Sheldon
- Produced by: Ted Richmond
- Starring: Roger Pryor; Virginia Vale; Lionel Royce; Lucien Prival; Duncan Renaldo; Lester Dorr
- Cinematography: Mack Stengler
- Edited by: Guy V. Thayer Jr.
- Production company: Producers Releasing Corporation
- Distributed by: Producers Releasing Corporation
- Release date: May 2, 1941
- Running time: 64 minutes
- Country: United States
- Language: English

South of Panama is a 1941 American action film directed by Jean Yarbrough and written by Ben Roberts and Sidney Sheldon. The film stars Roger Pryor, Virginia Vale, Lionel Royce, Lucien Prival, Duncan Renaldo and Lester Dorr. The film was released on May 2, 1941, by Producers Releasing Corporation.

== Plot ==
Jan Martin, sister of government chemist Paul Martin, realizes she is being followed by enemy agents after her brother. She ignores him at the Panama airport and embraces a stranger, Mike Lawrence, instead. Enemy agents Lake and Wilton are convinced that Mike is her brother and attempt to trap the pair. They get away but Jan disappears. Disguised with a black wig and new makeup, Jan becomes Dolores and gets a job singing at a cafe. Spotting Jan without her disguise, Mike follows her down an alley where they are trapped by Raynor, another espionage agent. They get away and Jan also gets away from Mike. Later, both Mike and Jan are captured and the agents realize that Mike is not the brother they are after. Paul is brought to the hideout, but Mike gets the drop on them.

== Cast ==
- Roger Pryor as Mike Lawrence
- Virginia Vale as Janice 'Jan' Martin aka Dolores Esteban
- Lionel Royce as Burns
- Lucien Prival as Raynor
- Duncan Renaldo as Captain of Police
- Lester Dorr as Joe
- Jack Ingram as Wilton
- Hugh Beaumont as Paul Martin
- Warren Jackson as Lake
- Edward Keane as Colonel Stoddard
- Sam McDaniel as Rodriguez Lincoln 'Rod' Jones
