= Touchdown (1931 film) =

1931 film

Touchdown!
- Directed by: Norman Z. McLeod
- Screenplay by: Grover Jones; William Slavens McNutt
- Starring: Richard Arlen; Peggy Shannon; Jack Oakie; Regis Toomey
- Cinematography: Arthur L. Todd
- Music by: John Leipold
- Distributed by: Paramount Publix Corporation
- Release date: 1931
- Running time: 79 minutes
- Country: United States
- Language: English

Touchdown is a 1931 American pre-Code football film directed by Norman Z. McLeod and starring Richard Arlen, Peggy Shannon, Jack Oakie and Regis Toomey. Jim Thorpe and Herman Brix appear uncredited as unbilled football players.

== Plot ==
Football coach Dan Curtis has to decide how much he wants to win, when one of his players is injured, when he puts in him the game to play, while still recovering from a previous injury.

Veteran coach "Pop" Stewart warns him that winning at all costs isn't worth it; and, he could lose a lot more than a game, including the respect of his old friend Babe; his girl, Mary; and, his player, Paul could lose his life.

== Cast ==
- Richard Arlen as Dan Curtis
- Peggy Shannon as Mary Gehring
- Jack Oakie as "Babe" Barton
- Regis Toomey as Tom Hussey
- George Barbier as Jerome Gehring
- J. Farrell MacDonald as Pop Stewart
- George Irving as President Baker

== Related information ==
Herman Brix broke his shoulder during filming, Touchdown; and, was unable to play Tarzan, in MGM's screen adaptation of Edgar Rice Burroughs's popular character, in the 1932 film, Tarzan the Ape Man. The injury prevented him from competing in the 1932 Olympics. At the time, he still held the world record for shot put. Swimming champion Johnny Weissmuller replaced him, as Tarzan, and became a major star.

== See also ==
- List of American football films
