= Hotel Continental (film) =

1932 film by Christy Cabanne

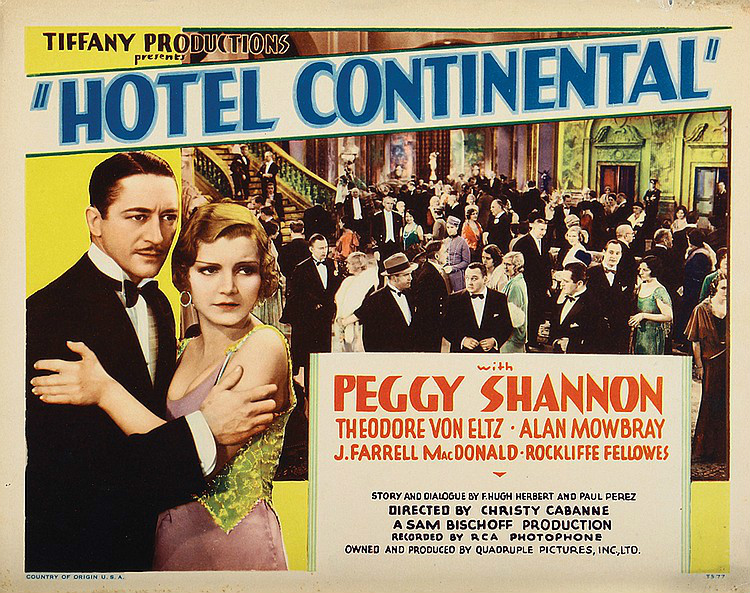
- Lobby card
- Directed by: Christy Cabanne
- Written by: Warren Duff; F. Hugh Herbert; Paul Perez
- Produced by: Samuel Bischoff
- Starring: Peggy Shannon; Theodore von Eltz; J. Farrell MacDonald
- Cinematography: Ira H. Morgan
- Edited by: Rose Loewinger
- Music by: Val Burton; Edward Kilenyi
- Production company: Tiffany Productions
- Distributed by: Tiffany Productions
- Release date: March 7, 1932
- Running time: 67 minutes
- Country: United States
- Language: English

Hotel Continental is a 1932 American pre-Code crime film directed by Christy Cabanne and starring Peggy Shannon, Theodore von Eltz and J. Farrell MacDonald.

== Plot ==
On the final night before the Hotel Continental is demolished, recently paroled embezzler Jim Bennett returns to recover a fortune he hid there years ago. He interrupts the suicide attempt of a lonely young woman, Ruth Carleton, and the two agree to start a new life together once he retrieves the money. Unknown to Jim, Ruth is working with a gang of crooks who have been waiting for him to lead them to the loot. When the gang threatens to kill Jim if she does not cooperate, Ruth must choose between betraying him and saving the man she has come to love.

== Cast ==
- Peggy Shannon as Ruth Carleton
- Theodore von Eltz as Jim Bennett
- J. Farrell MacDonald as Detective Martin
- Henry B. Walthall as Winthrop
- Alan Mowbray as Walter Underwood
- Mary Carlisle as Alicia
- Bert Roach as Charlie Layton
- Ethel Clayton as Mrs. Underwood
- Rockliffe Fellowes as Tierney
- William Scott as Mills
