= Stage to Chino =

1940 film directed by Edward Killy

- Directed by: Edward Killy; Kenneth Holmes (assistant)
- Screenplay by: Morton Grant; Arthur V. Jones
- Story by: Norton S. Parker
- Produced by: Bert Gilroy
- Cinematography: J. Roy Hunt
- Edited by: Frederic Knudtson
- Music by: Paul Sawtell
- Production company: RKO Radio Pictures
- Release date: July 26, 1940 (US)
- Running time: 60 minutes
- Country: United States
- Language: English

Stage to Chino is a 1940 American Western film directed by Edward Killy from a screenplay by Morton Grant and Arthur V. Jones, based on a story by Norton S. Parker. The film was released by RKO Radio Pictures on July 26, 1940, who also produced the film. It stars George O'Brien, Virginia Vale, and the vocal group, Pals of the Golden West.

== Plot ==
In the Old West the attempted robbery of a stagecoach, heading to the town of Chino, Arizona, carrying passengers and the U.S. Mail, is thwarted by cowhand Dan Clark. One of the passengers is stage line owner, Caroline McKay, whose uncle Charlie Lait manages the line. Another passenger, J. Horatio Boggs, recognizes Clark as a government agent. It is revealed the stage robbery was a set up between the driver, Bill Hoagland, and Dude Elliot, a rich landowner who runs a saloon and wants to take over the McKay stage line's mail contract. Dan suspects Elliot and accepts an offer to be the McKay's new stage driver; however, Lait, in cahoots with Elliot (unbeknownst to Caroline), wants to sell out.

It is revealed Clark is actually a U.S. Postal Inspector and he is instructed to investigate Elliot further. Clark discovers Elliot is short weighing gold miners who come to his bar to convert their gold into cash. Elliot blames his worker, Wheeler, for the fraud. Clark directs the McKay stage line to send the gold shipments to the government mint for proper processing. Elliot plots to sabotage the stagecoach to prevent the stage line from receiving a government contract in Prescott. Elliot deposits over $6,000 of his own gold with the McKay stage. Elliot eventually kills Wheeler.

Elliot's gang cause a fire at the McKay offices in order to destroy the stagecoach and rob the gold held in the safe. Knowing Lait is involved with Elliot, Clark makes Lait lead him to Elliot's hideout. Clark subdues a couple of henchmen and they intercept Caroline and Boggs who are driving the McKay stagecoach to Prescott. With Clark aboard, they chase the stage, driven by Hoagland, which Elliot dispatched to Prescott to report the "stolen" gold to the government and win the contract. However, the McKay stage begins to fall apart due to damage from the fire, and Clark is forced to jump onto Hoagland's stage. Clark subdues Hoagland and arrives in Prescott where Elliot is about to be awarded the mail contract. Clark charges Elliot with Wheeler's murder and the rest of his gang is arrested. Boggs, aware that Clark and Caroline are embarking on a romance, gives Clark a baby rattle he says is the "best West of the Mississippi."

== Cast ==
- George O'Brien as Dan Clark
- Virginia Vale as Caroline McKay
- Hobart Cavanaugh as J. Horatio Boggs
- Roy Barcroft as Dude Elliot
- William Haade as Slim
- Carl Stockdale as Charlie Lait
- Glenn Strange as Bill Hoagland
- Harry Cording as Pete Brannigan
- Martin Garralaga as Pedro
- Ethan Laidlaw as Wheeler
- Tom London as Dolan
- Pals of the Golden West as Musicians
