= Triple Justice =

1940 film

- Directed by: David Howard
- Written by: Arnold Belgard; Jack Roberts
- Screenplay by: Arthur V. Jones; Morton Grant
- Produced by: Bert Gilroy
- Starring: George O'Brien; Virginia Vale; Peggy Shannon
- Cinematography: J. Roy Hunt
- Edited by: Frederic Knudtson
- Music by: Paul Sawtell
- Production company: RKO Radio Pictures
- Distributed by: RKO Radio Pictures
- Release date: September 20, 1940
- Running time: 66 minutes
- Country: United States
- Language: English
- Budget: $85,000
- Box office: $129,000

Triple Justice is a 1940 American Western film directed by David Howard and starring George O'Brien, Virginia Vale and Peggy Shannon. The supporting cast includes Paul Fix and Glenn Strange.

== Cast ==
- George O'Brien as Brad Henderson
- Virginia Vale as Lorna Payson
- Peggy Shannon as Susan
- Harry Woods as Deputy Al Reeves
- Paul Fix as Fred Cleary
- LeRoy Mason as Sheriff Bill Gregory
- Glenn Strange as Frank Wiley
- Malcolm 'Bud' McTaggart as Tom Payson
- Robert McKenzie as Telegraph Operator
- Wilfred Lucas as Constable Herb of Tule Mesa
- The Lindeman Sisters as The Solas Sisters

== Box office ==
According to the RKO records, the picture recorded a loss of $5,000.
