= The Fargo Kid =

1940 film

- Directed by: Edward Killy
- Written by: Morton Grant (writer); Arthur V. Jones (writer)
- Based on: Sir Piegan Passes; 1923 short story by W.C. Tuttle
- Produced by: Bert Gilroy (producer); Lee S. Marcus (executive producer)
- Starring: Tim Holt
- Cinematography: Harry J. Wild
- Edited by: Frederic Knudtson
- Music by: John Leipold
- Distributed by: RKO Pictures
- Release date: December 6, 1940
- Running time: 63 minutes
- Country: United States
- Language: English

The Fargo Kid is a 1940 American Western film directed by Edward Killy starring Tim Holt. It was the second in Holt's series of Westerns for RKO. The film was shot in Kanab Canyon, Cave Lakes, and Johnson Canyon.

The script was based on a story which had been previously filmed as Man in the Rough (1928) and The Cheyenne Kid (1935).

== Plot summary ==
In the Old West, property assessor Nick Kane and his assistant Bush Cleveland know a gold vein sits deep on the gold claim of Caleb Winters. They plan to employ Deuce Mallory, a wanted hired gun whom they’ve never met, to kill Winters and force his widow to sell the claim. En route to the town, Mallory meets the Fargo Kid who is without his horse. The Kid takes Mallory’s horse after Mallory pulls his gun on him. Kane and Cleveland, who have a description of Mallory’s horse, mistake the Kid for Mallory and pay him $5,000 to kill Winters. The Kid tells his pals, Johnny and Whopper, that he has the money but not why. He also tells them not to reveal his true identity. The Kid goes to the Winters’ place and is nearly shot trying to investigate why he was hired.

Mallory makes it to Kane’s office where Kane discovers his identity and pays him to kill Winters. He also tells Mallory the Kid is posing as him. The sheriff sees the Kid with Mallory’s horse. Johnny and Whopper, recalling the Kid’s earlier request not to identify him, refuse, and the sheriff attempts to arrest the Kid as Mallory. A melee ensues and the Kid escapes. Johnny and Whopper are jailed by the sheriff for the melee; and the Kid is accosted by Kane and Cleveland who demand their money returned. The Kid overcomes them and forces them to go to the Winters’ place. Mallory heads there too. The sheriff releases Johnny and Whopper hoping they will lead him to Mallory (the Kid). Ultimately, the Kid subdues Mallory, and Kane is shot dead as the sheriff arrives, discovering the truth.

Winter’s daughter, Jenny, who is attracted to the Kid, asks him how she can show her gratitude. He confuses her by asking for one of her hair pins. As the Kid rides off with Johnny and Whopper, he uses the hair pin to retrieve the $5,000 he had hidden in the barrel of his gun.

== Cast ==
- Tim Holt as The Fargo Kid
- Ray Whitley as Johnny
- Emmett Lynn as Whopper
- Jane Drummond as Jenny Winters
- Cy Kendall as Nick Kane
- Ernie Adams as Bush Cleveland
- Paul Fix as Deuce Mallory
- Paul Scardon as Caleb Winters
- Glenn Strange as Sheriff Dave
- Mary MacLaren as Mrs. Sarah Winters

== Production ==
Filming took place from August 8–30.

== Soundtrack ==
- Ray Whitley's combo – "Crazy Ole Trails Ahead" (Music and lyrics by Ray Whitley and Fred Rose)
- Ray Whitley's combo – "Twilight on the Prairie" (Music and lyrics by Ray Whitley and Fred Rose)
- "Echo in the Night" (Music and lyrics by Ray Whitley and Fred Rose)
