= Virginia Vale =

American actress (1920–2006)

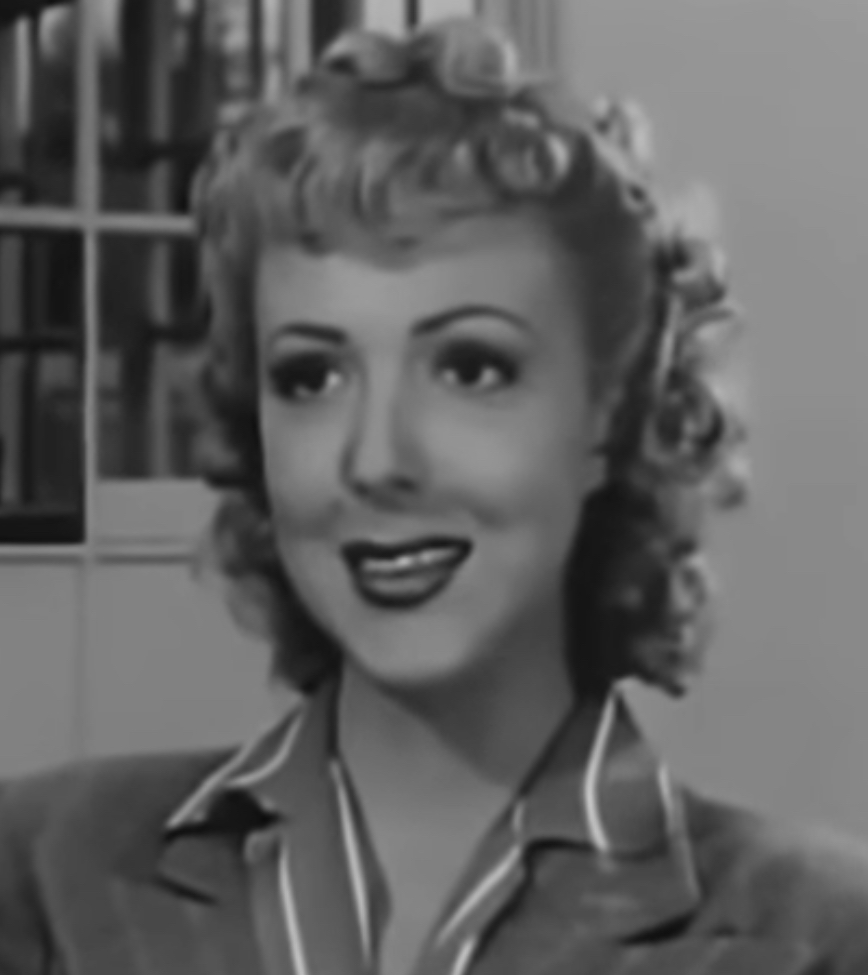
- Vale in Blonde Comet (1941)
- Born: Dorothy Howe; May 20, 1920; Dallas, Texas, US
- Died: September 14, 2006 (aged 86); Los Angeles, California, US
- Resting place: Forest Lawn Memorial Park, Hollywood Hills
- Occupations: Actress; U.S. Figure Skating Judge; Executive Secretary
- Years active: 1937–1945

Virginia Vale (born Dorothy Howe; May 20, 1920 – September 14, 2006) was an American film actress. She starred in a number of B-movie westerns but took a variety of other roles as well, notably in Blonde Comet (1941), in which she played a race car driver.

== Early years ==
Vale was the daughter of Mr. and Mrs. H. H. Howe. Before becoming a professional actress, she was a switchboard operator in Dallas, Texas, and honed her acting skills in productions at a little theater in Dallas. After a representative of Paramount Pictures saw her in a leading role, he invited her to make a screen test, which led to a contract. (Another source says that Howe was working at the switchboard in Metro-Goldwyn-Mayer's Dallas office, where a talent scout for Paramount found her and signed her to a contract.)

== Career ==
Dorothy Howe showed promise at Paramount, working steadily in the studio's feature films until 1939. Her best-known Paramount picture is probably The Big Broadcast of 1938, in which she played one of Bob Hope's former wives.

The name "Virginia Vale" had been chosen in advance for the female winner of the 1939 Gateway to Hollywood radio contest, a nationwide talent search sponsored by producer Jesse Lasky—as noted (somewhat indignantly) then by another Virginia Vale a syndicated columnist covering the film industry. Dorothy Howe edged out Rhonda Fleming in the 1939 contest, and was rechristened Virginia Vale.

Contest winners Vale and Kirby Grant were signed by RKO Radio Pictures, where they were promoted as new discoveries. They made their "debuts" (although both had previously worked in pictures) in the RKO dramatic feature Three Sons. After the promotional hoopla died down, RKO had no vehicles for Vale: although her alto speaking voice and mature demeanor belied her age (19 years old), she was too young to play conventional ingenues. Instead, she was cast in inexpensive B-western features starring George O'Brien or Tim Holt. Although she also appeared in small roles in the studio's features and short subjects, she usually worked in RKO westerns. By 1941 she was established as the leading lady in RKO's Ray Whitley western shorts.

PRC, the smallest of the Hollywood studios, couldn't afford star names and relied on familiar featured players. In 1941 PRC borrowed Virginia Vale from RKO to co-star in South of Panama opposite Roger Pryor. After her RKO contract lapsed in 1942, Vale returned to PRC for two features before going on hiatus for three years. She came back to PRC in 1945 for a single feature, Crime, Inc., signaling the end of her movie career. "The last year I remained in the business, I only worked three weeks," she recalled. "I didn't know how to approach anybody about work. I just figured, 'This is not for me, so I'll say goodbye to the industry." Virginia Vale's final association with PRC was performing live at the studio for an American Legion function on September 29, 1945.

After her film career, she became an executive secretary at Lockheed and also a competition judge for the US Figure Skating Association. She was eventually honored by the USFSA for 50 years of service in that role. Before becoming a judge, she'd also briefly been a competition skater. Her life in film and skating was featured at the 2002 U.S. figure skating championships and a memorial trophy for "most outstanding performance" was given in her name at the 2007 California Championships.

== Death ==
She died in 2006 and was buried in Hollywood Hills at Forest Lawn Cemetery.

== Filmography ==
Year	Title	Role	Notes
1937	Night Club Scandal	Marsh's Maid	Credited as Dorothy Howe
1937	True Confession	Brunette Girl	Uncredited
1938	The Buccaneer		Uncredited
1938	The Big Broadcast of 1938	Joan Fielding	
1938	Her Jungle Love	Eleanor Martin	
1938	Cocoanut Grove	Hazel De Vore	
1938	King of Alcatraz	Dixie	
1939	Disbarred	Airline Stewardess	
1939	Ambush	Waitress at Restaurant	Uncredited
1939	Persons in Hiding	Flo	
1939	Unmarried	Betty	
1939	Three Sons	Phoebe Pardway	(first film as Virginia Vale)
1939	The Marshal of Mesa City	Virginia King	
1940	Legion of the Lawless	Ellen Ives	
1940	Bullet Code	Molly Mathews	
1940	You Can't Fool Your Wife	Sally	
1940	Prairie Law	Priscilla Brambull	
1940	Millionaires in Prison	May Thomas	
1940	Stage to Chino	Caroline McKay	
1940	Triple Justice	Lorna Payson	
1941	Repent at Leisure	Elevator Girl	Uncredited
1941	Robbers of the Range	Alice Tremaine	
1941	South of Panama	Janice 'Jan' Martin, aka Dolores Esteban	
1941	Unexpected Uncle	Telephone Girl	Uncredited
1941	The Gay Falcon	Hysterical Woman	Uncredited
1941	Blonde Comet	Beverly Blake	
1942	Broadway Big Shot	Betty Collins	
1945	Crime, Inc.	Trixie Waters	(final film role)

== Bibliography ==
- Boyd Magers, Michael G. Fitzgerald (1999), Westerns Women: Interviews With 50 Leading Ladies Of Movie And Television Westerns From The 1930s To The 1960s, Jefferson, N.C.: McFarland and Co., ISBN 0-7864-2028-6
- Herb Fagen (1996), White Hats and Silver Spurs: Interviews With 24 Stars of Film and Television Westerns of the Thirties Through the Sixties, Jefferson, N.C.: McFarland and Co., ISBN 0-7864-0200-8
