= The Only Girl in the Orchestra =

2023 documentary short film by Molly O'Brien

- Netflix release poster
- Directed by: Molly O'Brien
- Produced by: Molly O'Brien; Lisa Remington
- Starring: Orin O'Brien
- Cinematography: Martina Radwan
- Edited by: Monique Zavistovski
- Music by: Laura Karpman
- Production company: LFR INDUSTRIES
- Distributed by: Netflix
- Release dates: November 9, 2023 (Doc NYC); December 4, 2024 (Netflix)
- Running time: 35 minutes
- Country: United States
- Language: English

The Only Girl in the Orchestra is a 2023 American musical documentary short film directed by Molly O'Brien. It had its world premiere on November 9, 2023, at Doc NYC (SHORTS: SHE STORIES section). It was released globally on December 4, 2024, by Netflix. The film won Best Documentary Short Film at the 97th Academy Awards.

== Summary ==
Orin O'Brien, a double bassist, became the New York Philharmonic's first female musician in 1966, hired by Leonard Bernstein. Now 87 and recently retired, she reflects on her remarkable career, valuing a quiet, supportive role for loved ones and students. The documentary by her niece, Molly O'Brien, highlights Orin's impact and her belief that fulfillment lies in embracing a secondary role.

== Cast ==
- Orin O'Brien as herself
- Carlos Barriento as himself
- Leonard Bernstein as himself (archival footage)

== Release ==
The film was showcased in the Vail Film Festival on December 9, 2023. In April 2024, the film was showcased at the 26th RiverRun International Film Festival. In June 2024, it was featured in the Shorts Program: One-of-a-Kind of DC/DOX.

The film was showcased at the Doc NYC on November 14, 2024, in the Short List shorts, Extraordinary People.

== Reception ==
Paul Emmanuel Enicola reviewing the film at Doc NYC graded it A− and wrote, "Delightfully insightful and criminally short, The Only Girl in the Orchestra serves as a masterclass not only on how to make it in music; but also how to succeed in life."

== Accolades ==
Award	Date of ceremony	Category	Recipient(s)	Result	Ref.
Minneapolis–Saint Paul International Film Festival	April 25, 2024	Best Short Documentary	The Only Girl in the Orchestra	Won	
Critics' Choice Documentary Awards	November 10, 2024	Best Short Documentary	The Only Girl in the Orchestra	Won	
Cinema Eye Honors	January 9, 2025	Outstanding Non-Fiction Short	The Only Girl in the Orchestra	Shortlisted	
Academy Awards	March 2, 2025	Best Documentary Short Film	Molly O'Brien and Lisa Remington	Won	

== See also ==
- Submissions for Best Documentary Short Academy Award
- Maestro (2023 Bradley Cooper biopic about Leonard Bernstein)
