= Margaret Callahan =

American nursing administrator

Margaret Faut-Callahan
- Born: Chicago, Illinois
- Education: Loyola University Chicago; Rush University

Margaret Faut-Callahan is the Health Sciences provost at Loyola University Chicago.

== Biography ==
Callahan earned her undergraduate degree at Loyola University Chicago and both her master's and Ph.D. degrees at Rush University in Chicago, where she served as an administrator at the university or at Rush University Medical Center for more than 25 years prior to coming to Marquette. She is a nurse anesthetist.

Callahan has researched and published extensively in the areas of palliative care; pain perception, assessment and management; stress in the perioperative patient; nursing and health systems approach to ambulatory care; and nurse anesthesia. An elected fellow of the American Academy of Nursing, National Academies of Practice, and the Institute of Medicine Chicago, Callahan is the principal investigator of a National Institute of Health – National Cancer Institute study on "Interdisciplinary Palliative Care Education."

Callahan has served in various leadership capacities in state and national nursing and nurse anesthesia organizations. She serves as a Commission on Collegiate Nursing Education accreditation reviewer. Callahan is a member of the American Nurses Association, American Association of Nurse Anesthetists, and Sigma Theta Tau. Callahan is involved with a number of civic and community organizations. She currently sits on the council of advisors at the Niehoff School of Nursing at Loyola University Chicago and the board of trustees at Rush University Medical Center.
