= David Howard (director) =

American film director (1896–1941)

- Born: David Paget Davis III; October 6, 1896; Philadelphia, Pennsylvania, US
- Died: December 21, 1941 (aged 45); Los Angeles, California, US
- Occupation: Film director
- Years active: 1930-1941

David Howard (born David Paget Davis III; October 6, 1896 – December 21, 1941) was an American film director. He directed 46 films between 1930 and 1941, 29 of them westerns starring George O'Brien, including the acclaimed Mystery Ranch (1932).

== Biography ==
He was born as David Paget Davis III in Philadelphia, Pennsylvania.

He died at St. Vincent's Hospital in Los Angeles, California on December 21, 1941.

== Selected filmography ==
- There Were Thirteen (1931)
- The Rainbow Trail (1931)
- The Golden West (1932)
- Mystery Ranch (1932)
- The Mystery Squadron (1933) (writer & director)
- Robbers' Roost (1933)
- Smoke Lightning (1933)
- The Lost Jungle (1934) (writer & screenplay)
- In Old Santa Fe (1934)
- The Marines Are Coming (1934)
- Whispering Smith Speaks (1935)
- Hard Rock Harrigan (1936)
- Thunder Mountain (1935)
- Conflict (1936)
- Daniel Boone (1936)
- The Border Patrolman (1936)
- The Mine with the Iron Door (1936)
- Windjammer (1937) (associate producer)
- Park Avenue Logger (1937)
- Painted Desert (1938)
- Border G-Man (1938)
- Lawless Valley (1938)
- Hollywood Stadium Mystery (1938)
- The Renegade Ranger (1938)
- Gun Law (1938)
- The Rookie Cop (1939)
- Timber Stampede (1939)
- Arizona Legion (1939)
- Marshal of Mesa City (1939)
- Trouble in Sundown (1939)
- The Fighting Gringo (1939)
- Prairie Law (1940)
- Triple Justice (1940)
- Bullet Code (1940)
- Legion of the Lawless (1940)
- Dude Cowboy (1941)
