= Orin O'Brien =

Musical artist (born 1935)

- Born: June 7, 1935 (age 91); Hollywood, Los Angeles, California
- Genre: Classical
- Occupation: Musician
- Instrument: Double bass
- Formerly of: New York Philharmonic

Orin O'Brien (born 1935) is an American double bassist. She was a member of the New York Philharmonic, joining in 1966 under the direction of Leonard Bernstein; she was the first woman to join the orchestra. O’Brien retired from the Philharmonic in 2021 after a 55-year career. She was on the college faculty at the Juilliard School (where she was co-chair of the double bass department from 1992 to 2002), Manhattan School of Music, and Mannes College The New School for Music. O'Brien is also currently on the Preparatory Division faculty at the Manhattan School.

== Career ==
O'Brien was born in Hollywood, California, to actors George O'Brien and Marguerite Churchill. She began her studies with Milton Kestenbaum, former principal bass of the Pittsburgh Symphony under Fritz Reiner and member of the NBC Symphony under Arturo Toscanini; and with Herman Reinshagen, assistant-principal bass of the New York Philharmonic under Gustav Mahler and Arturo Toscanini at the University of California, Los Angeles. She continued her studies at the Juilliard School in New York City with Frederick Zimmermann, assistant principal double bass of the New York Philharmonic for many of his 36 years there. O'Brien attended the Music Academy of the West summer conservatory in 1952, 1953, 1954, and 1955.

Before joining the New York Philharmonic, O'Brien performed with the New York City Ballet, the Metropolitan Opera, and the American Symphony Orchestra (under Leopold Stokowski, under whom she played the double bass solo as principal bass in the U.S. premiere of Alberto Ginastera's Variaciones Concertantes, in 1962). She performed at the Marlboro Music Festival in the 1960s where she made recordings with Pablo Casals and gave the premiere of Gunther Schuller's Quartet for Double Basses, which was later recorded with Alvin Brehm, Robert Gladstone and Frederick Zimmermann.

She formerly taught at YMHA, the Estherwood Summer Musical Festival, and the Institute de Haute Etudes Musicales in Montreux, Switzerland. O'Brien has given masterclasses at the Peabody Institute, the Tanglewood Festival, New England Conservatory, and Yale University.

== Family ==
O'Brien's brother is true crime author Darcy O'Brien, who died in 1998. Their parents were George O'Brien and Marguerite Churchill, both successful film actors.

== In popular culture ==
Orin O'Brien’s story is documented in the Netflix documentary The Only Girl in the Orchestra. The film, directed by her niece Molly O’Brien, premiered on Netflix on December 4, 2024, and won the Academy Award for Best Documentary Short Film at the 97th Academy Awards.

== Awards ==
In 2010 she received Manhattan School of Music Medal of the President’s Medal for Distinguished Faculty Service.
