= Blonde Comet =

1941 film by William Beaudine

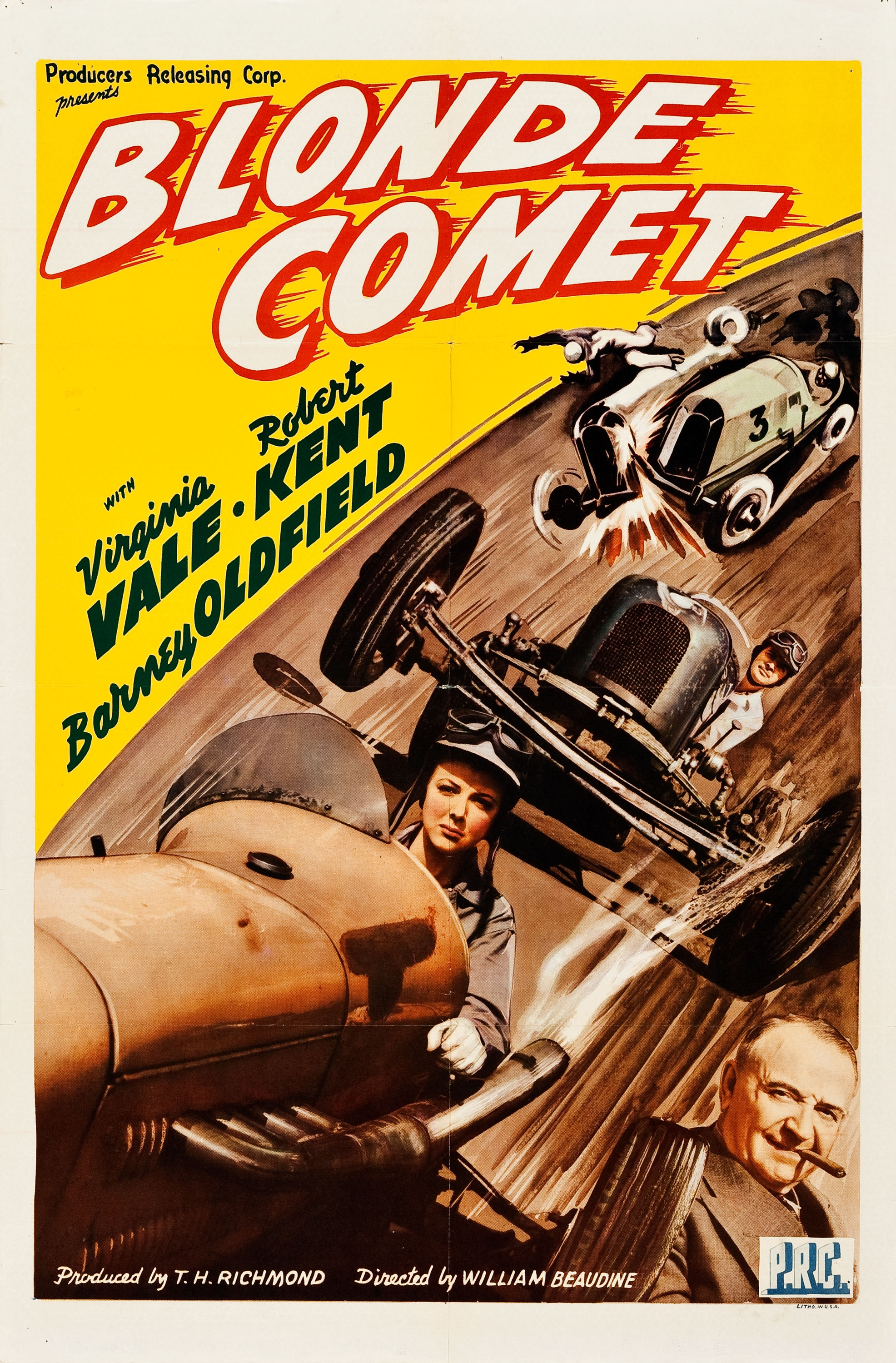
- Film poster
- Directed by: William Beaudine; Arthur Hammons; Tiny Hamberger
- Written by: Philip Juergens; Robin Daniels; Martin Mooney
- Produced by: T. H. Richmond; Mervyn Freeman
- Cinematography: Mervyn Freeman
- Edited by: Holbrook N. Todd
- Production company: Producers Releasing Corporation
- Distributed by: Producers Releasing Corporation
- Release date: December 26, 1941
- Running time: 67 minutes
- Country: United States
- Language: English

Blonde Comet is a 1941 American sports racing film directed by William Beaudine and starring Virginia Vale, Robert Kent, and Barney Oldfield. It was distributed by the independent Producers Releasing Corporation as a second feature.

== Plot ==
A female racing driver competes all over Europe then returns to America where she finds romance with a male driver against whom she races.

== Cast ==
- Virginia Vale as Beverly Blake
- Robert Kent as Jim Flynn
- Barney Oldfield as Himself
- Vince Barnett as "Curly"
- William Halligan as "Cannonball" Blake
- Joey Ray as "Red" Stewart
- Red Knight as "Tex"
- Diana Hughes as Jennie
