= George O'Brien (actor) =

American actor (1899–1985)

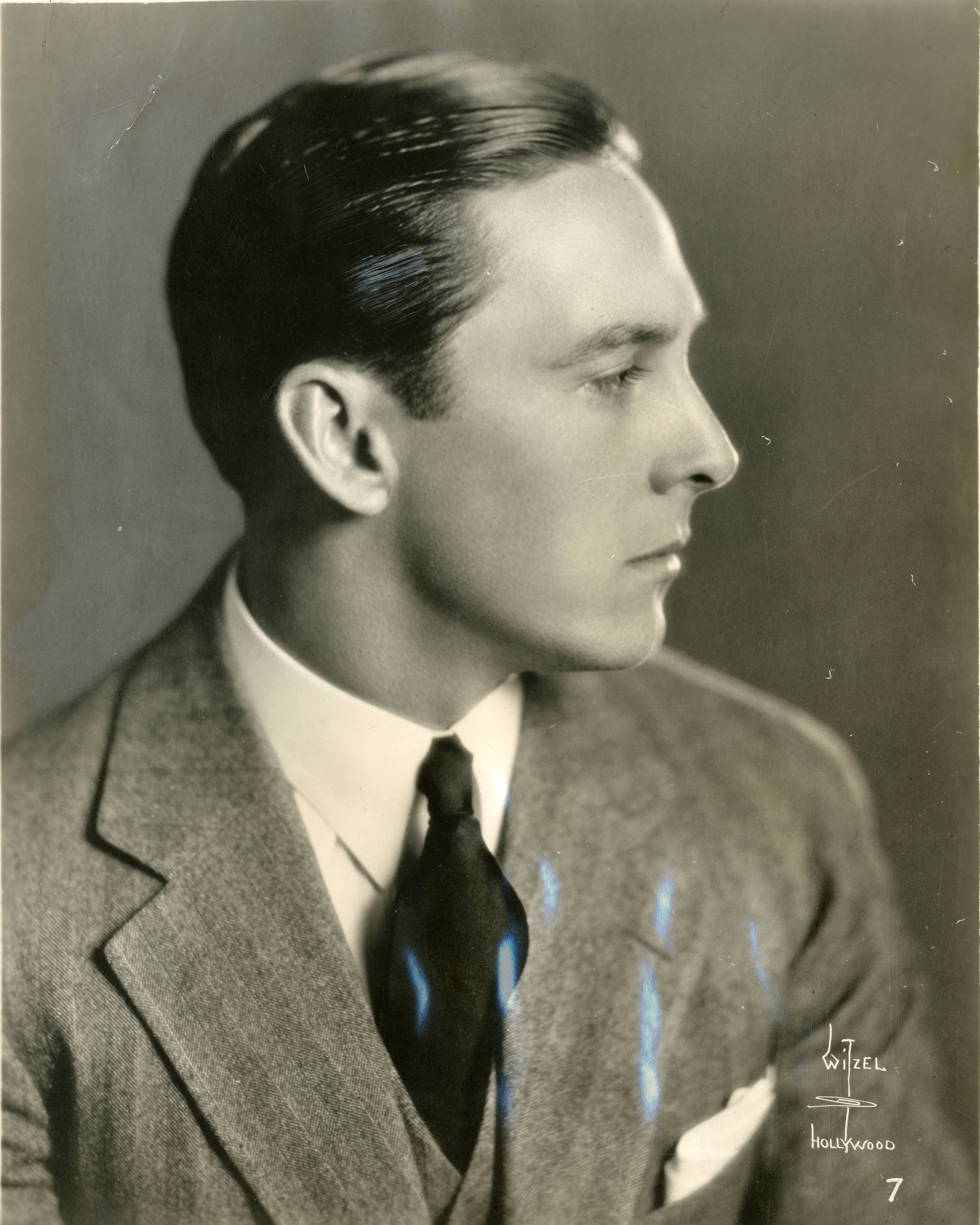
- O'Brien in 1926
- Born: April 19, 1899; San Francisco, California, U.S.
- Died: September 4, 1985 (aged 86); Broken Arrow, Oklahoma, U.S.
- Occupation: Actor
- Years active: 1922–1964
- Spouse: Marguerite Churchill (m. 1933; div. 1948)
- Children: 3, including Darcy and Orin O'Brien

George O'Brien (April 19, 1899 – September 4, 1985) was an American actor, popular during the silent film era and into the sound film era of the 1930s. He is best known today as the lead actor in F. W. Murnau's 1927 Academy Award-winning film Sunrise: A Song of Two Humans. O'Brien also starred in a number of Westerns in the 1930s and 1940s, including roles in 14 films under director David Howard and 10 with acclaimed filmmaker John Ford.

== Early life ==
O'Brien was born in San Francisco, California, the oldest son of Daniel J. and Margaret L. (née Donahue) O'Brien; O'Brien's father later became the chief of police for the City of San Francisco. (Dan O'Brien ordered the arrest of Roscoe "Fatty" Arbuckle in September 1921 at the scandalous Labor Day party held by Arbuckle.)

In 1917, O'Brien enlisted in the United States Navy to fight in World War I, serving on a submarine chaser. He volunteered to act as a stretcher bearer for wounded Marines and was decorated for bravery. After the war, O'Brien became Light Heavyweight boxing champion of the Pacific Fleet.

== Career ==
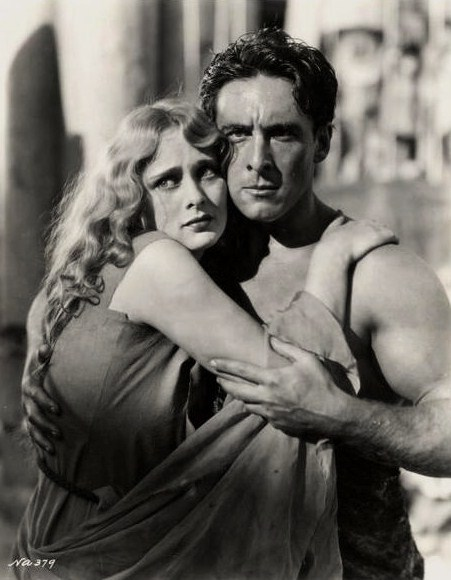
With Dolores Costello in Noah's Ark (1928)

O'Brien came to Hollywood in his early 20s, hoping to become a cameraman. He worked as an assistant cameraman for both Tom Mix and Buck Jones. He began his acting career in bit parts and as a stuntman. One of his early roles was in the 1922 George Melford-directed drama Moran of the Lady Letty, most notable for starring Rudolph Valentino. In 1924, O'Brien received his first starring role in the drama The Man Who Came Back with the English actress Dorothy Mackaill. The same year, he was chosen by John Ford to star in The Iron Horse with actress Madge Bellamy. The film was an immense success at the box office, and O'Brien made nine more films for Ford. In 1927, he starred in the F. W. Murnau-directed Sunrise: A Song of Two Humans with Janet Gaynor, which won three major Academy Awards and remains his most famous film, and he played the lead in the epic East Side, West Side.

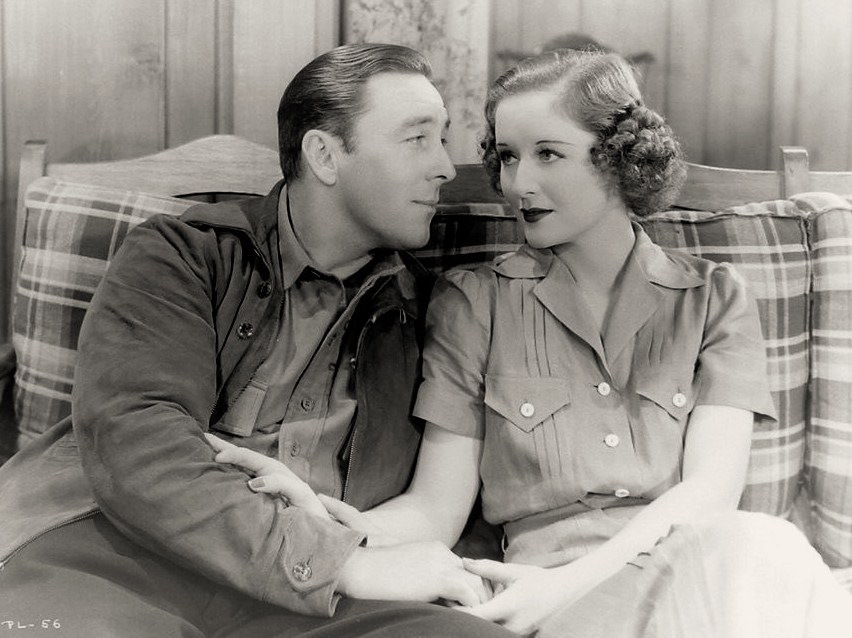
O'Brien and Beatrice Roberts in Park Avenue Logger (1937)

O'Brien spent the remainder of the 1920s as an extremely popular leading man in films, often starring in action and adventure roles with popular actresses of the era, such as Alma Rubens, Anita Stewart, Dolores Costello, Madge Bellamy, Olive Borden (with whom he was linked romantically during the 1920s), and Janet Gaynor. With the advent of sound, O'Brien displayed a strong, confident voice and remained a leading star of westerns and outdoor adventures. In 1938, he signed with RKO Radio Pictures to headline a western series; O'Brien (often atop his horse Mike) was well received and was ranked consistently among the top 10 cowboy stars. During this series of westerns, he starred with actress Virginia Vale on six occasions and with actor Chill Wills five times. The RKO series was stopped at 17 movies when O'Brien re-enlisted in the Navy; he was replaced by RKO with Tim Holt who had a longer association with RKO than O'Brien.

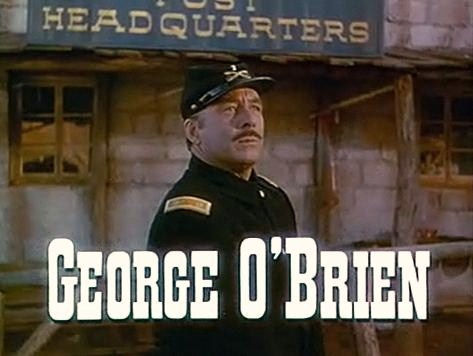
Trailer for She Wore a Yellow Ribbon (1949)

== Military service ==
During World War II, O'Brien served as a beachmaster in the Pacific, and was decorated several times. He left service with the rank of commander. He later joined the United States Naval Reserve and retired with the rank of captain in 1962, having four times been recommended for the rank of admiral.

Following his service in World War II, O'Brien occasionally took featured parts in films directed by John Ford, including Fort Apache, She Wore a Yellow Ribbon, and Cheyenne Autumn. O'Brien's last leading role was in the 1951 movie Gold Raiders, with O'Brien handling the action and the Three Stooges' (Shemp Howard, Larry Fine, and Moe Howard) doing comedy routines.

While serving in the Naval Reserve, O'Brien took on a project for the Department of Defense as part of President Eisenhower's "People to People" program. He was project officer for a series of orientation films on three Asian countries. One of these films, This Is Korea, was directed by John Ford. The other two countries covered were Formosa (Taiwan) and the Philippines.

== Personal life ==
In the 1920s, O'Brien dated actress Olive Borden for many years, and most thought they would marry. For some reason (some say his family did not approve of Olive), they ended their relationship and he eventually married actress Marguerite Churchill on July 15, 1933. Their first child, Brian, died 10 days after his birth. Daughter Orin O'Brien became a double bassist for the New York Philharmonic. Their youngest child Darcy O'Brien was a successful writer and college professor. George and Marguerite divorced in 1948.

== Later years and death ==
O'Brien suffered a stroke in 1981 and was bedridden the last four years of his life. He died in 1985 in Broken Arrow, Oklahoma, a suburb of Tulsa. His son Darcy was a professor at the University of Tulsa.

For his contribution to the movie industry, O'Brien was awarded a star on the Hollywood Walk of Fame at 6201 Hollywood Blvd. in Los Angeles.

== Partial filmography ==
Film performances
Year	Title	Role	Notes
1922	Moran of the Lady Letty	Deck Hand	directed by George Melford; uncredited; with Rudolph Valentino
1922	The Ghost Breaker	A Ghost	directed by Alfred E. Green; uncredited
1922	White Hands	Sailor	directed by Lambert Hillyer
1923	The Ne'er-Do-Well	Clifford	directed by Alfred E. Green
1924	The Man Who Came Back	Henry Potter	directed by Emmett J. Flynn
1924	The Iron Horse	Davy Brandon	directed by John Ford
1924	Shadows of Paris	Louis	directed by Herbert Brenon
1925	The Dancers	Tony	directed by Emmett J. Flynn
1925	The Fighting Heart	Denny Bolton	directed by John Ford
1925	Havoc	Dick Chappel	directed by Rowland V. Lee
1925	Thank You	Kenneth Jamieson	directed by John Ford
1926	The Johnstown Flood	Tom O'Day	directed by Irving Cummings
1926	The Silver Treasure	Nostromo	directed by Rowland V. Lee
1926	The Blue Eagle	George Darcy	directed by John Ford
1926	3 Bad Men	Dan O'Malley	directed by John Ford
1927	Is Zat So?	Ed "Chick" Cowan	directed by Alfred E. Green
1927	Paid to Love	Crown Prince Michael	directed by Howard Hawks
1927	Sunrise: A Song of Two Humans	Farmer	directed by F. W. Murnau
1927	East Side, West Side	John Breen	directed by Allan Dwan
1928	Noah's Ark	Travis/Japheth	directed by Michael Curtiz
1928	Sharp Shooters	George	directed by John G. Blystone
1929	Salute	Cadet John Randall	directed by David Butler; with John Wayne (uncredited)
1929	True Heaven	Lieutenant Philip Gresson	directed by James Tinling
1929	Masked Emotions	Bramdlet Dickery	directed by Kenneth Hawks
1930	Rough Romance	Billy West	directed by A. F. Erickson; with John Wayne (uncredited)
1931	Riders of the Purple Sage	Jim Lassiter	directed by Hamilton McFadden
1931	Seas Beneath	Cmdr. Robert "Bob" Kingsley	directed by John Ford
1931	A Holy Terror	Tony Bard a.k.a. "Woodbury"	directed by Irving Cummings
1932	The Golden West	David Lynch/Motano	directed by David Howard
1932	Robbers' Roost	Jim Wall	directed by David Howard and Louis King
1933	The Last Trail	Tom Daley	directed by James Tinling
1934	Frontier Marshal	Michael Wyatt	directed by Lewis Seiler
1935	The Cowboy Millionaire	Bob Walker	directed by Edward F. Cline
1936	Daniel Boone	Daniel Boone	directed by David Howard
1937	Windjammer	Bruce Lane	directed by Ewing Scott
1937	Park Avenue Logger	Grant Curran	directed by David Howard
1938	Painted Desert	Bob McVey	directed by David Howard
1938	Lawless Valley	Larry Rhodes	directed by David Howard
1938	Gun Law	Tom O'Malley	directed by David Howard
1938	The Renegade Ranger	Captain Jack Steele	directed by David Howard
1938	Border G-Man	Jim Galloway	directed by David Howard
1939	Timber Stampede	Scott Baylor	directed by David Howard
1939	Arizona Legion	Boone Yeager	directed by David Howard
1939	The Fighting Gringo	Wade Barton	directed by David Howard
1939	The Marshal of Mesa City	Cliff Mason	directed by David Howard
1940	Triple Justice	Brad Henderson	directed by David Howard
1940	Stage to Chino	Dan Clark	directed by Edward Killy
1947	My Wild Irish Rose	William "Duke" Muldoon	directed by David Butler
1948	Fort Apache	Capt. Sam Collingwood	directed by John Ford; with John Wayne
1949	She Wore a Yellow Ribbon	Maj. Mac Allshard	directed by John Ford; with John Wayne
1951	Gold Raiders	George O'Brien	directed by Edward Bernds; released in Great Britain as The Stooges Go West; with The Three Stooges
1964	Cheyenne Autumn	Major Braden	directed by John Ford; with Jimmy Stewart

Television performances
Year	Title	Role	Notes
1957	Studio 57		1 episode

== Awards ==
Year	Award	Result	Category	Notes
1976	Western Heritage Awards	Won	Trustees Award	for outstanding career portraying the Western movie hero
