= Weidler =

Weidler (German: variant of Weidner) is a surname. Notable people with the surname include:

- Alfred Weidler (1886–1966), German-born American Hollywood model builder, father of child actress Virginia and saxophonist George
- Charles Weidler, NASCAR racing driver (1952-1953)
- Danny Weidler, Australian journalist
- George Washington Weidler (1837–1908), American businessman
- George William Weidler (1926–1989), American saxophonist
- Volker Weidler (born 1962), German racing driver
- Virginia Weidler (1927–1968), American child actress
