= Ready for Love (film) =

1934 film by Marion Gering

- Directed by: Marion Gering
- Screenplay by: J.P. McEvoy; William Slavens McNutt
- Based on: a novel by Roy Flanagan]
- Produced by: Albert Lewis (producer); Emanuel Cohen (executive producer)
- Starring: Richard Arlen; Ida Lupino; Marjorie Rambeau
- Cinematography: Leon Shamroy
- Edited by: Eda Warren
- Music by: John Leipold; Heinz Roemheld and Tom Satterfield (all uncredited)
- Production company: Paramount Pictures
- Distributed by: Paramount Pictures
- Release date: November 30, 1934 (Los Angeles)
- Running time: 62 minutes
- Country: United States
- Language: English

Ready for Love is a 1934 American romantic comedy film directed by Marion Gering and presented by Adolph Zukor for Paramount Pictures. It stars Richard Arlen, Ida Lupino, and Marjorie Rambeau. It is inspired by the play The Whipping by Eulalie Spence, based on the 1930 novel The Whipping by Roy Flanagan. The film is about school runaway Marigold Tate (Ida Lupino) who "journeys to her retired aunt's home where she soon faces small-town bigotry", and falls in love with handsome newspaper editor Julian Barrow (Richard Arlen).

The film marks the first appearance of Terry, the Cairn Terrier who would go on to appear as Toto in The Wizard of Oz (1939).

== Cast ==
- Richard Arlen as Julian Barrow
- Ida Lupino as Marigold Tate
- Marjorie Rambeau as Goldie Tate
- Junior Durkin as Joey Burke
- Beulah Bondi as Mrs. Burke
- Esther Howard as Aunt Ida
- Ralph Remley as Chester Burke
- Charles Arnt as Sam Gardner
- Henry Travers as Judge Pickett
- Charles Sellon as Caleb Hooker

== Production ==
Actress Ida Lupino was stricken with polio soon after filming commenced and was concerned during production that she might have to spend the rest of her life in a wheelchair.
