= The Millionaire (TV series) =

American anthology series (1955–1960)

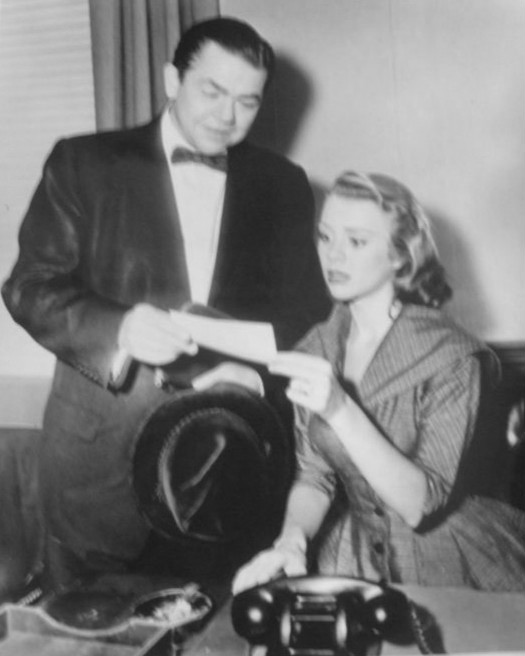
- Michael Anthony (Marvin Miller) hands check to Betty Perkins (Inger Stevens) in a 1956 episode
- Also known as: If You Had a Million
- Genre: Anthology drama
- Starring: Paul Frees; Marvin Miller
- Composers: Stanley Wilson; Jeff Alexander (6.28); Wilbur Hatch (6.35); William Lava (6.16)
- Country of origin: United States
- Original language: English
- No. of seasons: 6
- No. of episodes: 207

Production
- Executive producer: Fred Henry
- Producer: Don Fedderson
- Camera setup: Single-camera
- Running time: 30 minutes
- Production companies: Silverstone Films; Don Fedderson Productions; MCA TV

Original release
- Network: CBS
- Release: January 19, 1955 – June 7, 1960

The Millionaire is an American anthology series that aired on CBS from 1955 to 1960. It was originally sponsored by Colgate-Palmolive. The series, produced by Don Fedderson and Fred Henry, explored the ways that sudden and unexpected wealth changed life, for better or for worse. It told the stories of people who were given one million dollars ($12 million in 2025 dollars) from a benefactor who insisted they must never know his identity, with one exception.

The series became a five-season hit during the Golden Age of Television, finishing in the Nielsen ratings at #9 for the 1955–1956 season, #13 in 1956–1957, #17 in 1957–1958 and #30 in 1958–1959. In syndication, it was known by two titles: The Millionaire and If You Had a Million.

== Benefactor ==
The benefactor was named John Beresford Tipton. Viewers heard his voice, making observations and giving instructions; they generally saw only his arm as he reached for a cashier's check for one million dollars each week and handed it to Michael Anthony, his executive secretary. It was Anthony's job to deliver that check to its intended recipient. The voice of the unseen John Beresford Tipton was played—uncredited—by veteran character actor and voice artist Paul Frees. (Frees was seen on camera playing other roles in two episodes.) In the closing credits of each episode, the actors and the roles they played would be listed, invariably ending with "and John Beresford Tipton", implying that he was a real person playing himself. The character's name was actually derived from the birthplaces of Millionaire producer Don Fedderson and his wife Tido: they were born in Beresford, South Dakota and Tipton, Missouri, respectively.

== Executive secretary ==
The Millionaire began with a very brief opening theme fanfare behind the ascending title frame, followed by the camera's training directly upon Michael Anthony, played by veteran character actor and radio and television announcer Marvin Miller.

The Millionaire told the stories of Tipton's beneficiaries in flashback, as if from Anthony's case files. Each episode began with Anthony, behind his desk and looking directly into the camera, speaking one or another variation on this theme:

My name is Michael Anthony, and until his death just a few years ago, I was the executive secretary to the late John Beresford Tipton. John Beresford Tipton, a fabulously wealthy and fascinating man, whose many hobbies included his habit of giving away one million dollars, tax free, each week—to persons he had never even met.

From there, the camera faded to a brief tour of the grounds on which Tipton's home stood, as Anthony continued speaking:

This is Silverstone, John Beresford Tipton's 60,000 acre estate. From here, he spent the later years of his life pursuing many hobbies, often tied to his fascination with human nature and behavior. Mr. Tipton was a man of so many wide interests, that when called into his presence, one never knew just what to expect.

The camera then showed Anthony entering Tipton's presence, with Tipton frequently engaged in another one of his many wide-ranging hobbies. Anthony invariably greeted him with, "You sent for me, sir?" Tipton spoke for a moment to Anthony (always referring to him as "Mike"), chatting about his doings and explaining what prompted him to choose "our next millionaire", before he actually handed Anthony the envelope containing the check, sometimes adding, "I'll want a full report."

Though "Tipton" was heard in every episode, Miller was the only cast member who was seen in every episode. He was usually only seen in the first few minutes of any given story, returning very briefly to directly address viewers at the episode's end (often promoting the story in next week's episode). These closings are often cut in syndicated airings.

== Others ==
The only other recurring supporting actor was Roy Gordon as banker Andrew V. McMahon, on whose Gotham Trust Bank the anonymous Tipton's cashier's checks were drawn. In a few of the very earliest episodes, recipients had to pick up their check at the bank and it was McMahon (not Michael Anthony) who interacted with the recipients of Tipton's money and outlined the conditions of acceptance. Fairly quickly, this was altered to having Anthony personally deliver the check (and outline the conditions of acceptance), rendering the McMahon character superfluous. Accordingly, McMahon was seen in about half the episodes from the first season, and in the first two episodes of the second season—then was dropped. Later episodes showed a close up of a cashier's check drawn from the "First Molkefstorming Bank".

Ed Herlihy was the announcer for The Millionaire throughout the run. Lastly, while not a cast member but seen in a cameo appearance in virtually every episode as a prominently featured extra, was Tido Fedderson.

== The beneficiaries ==
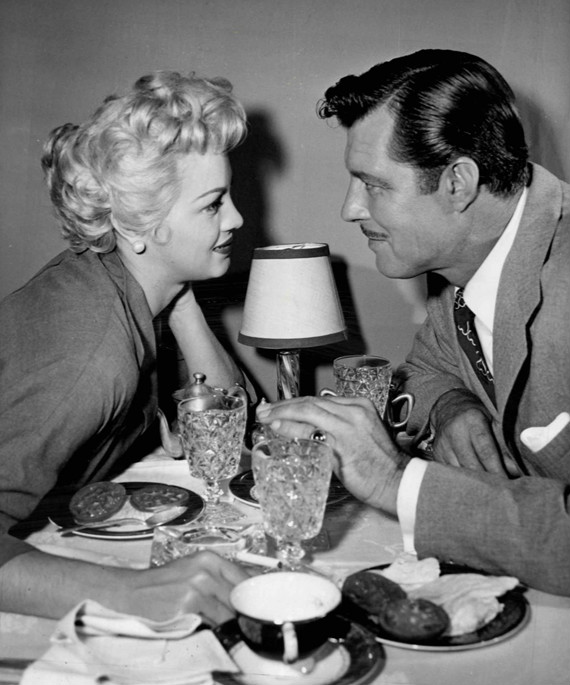
Angie Dickinson and James Craig, 1957

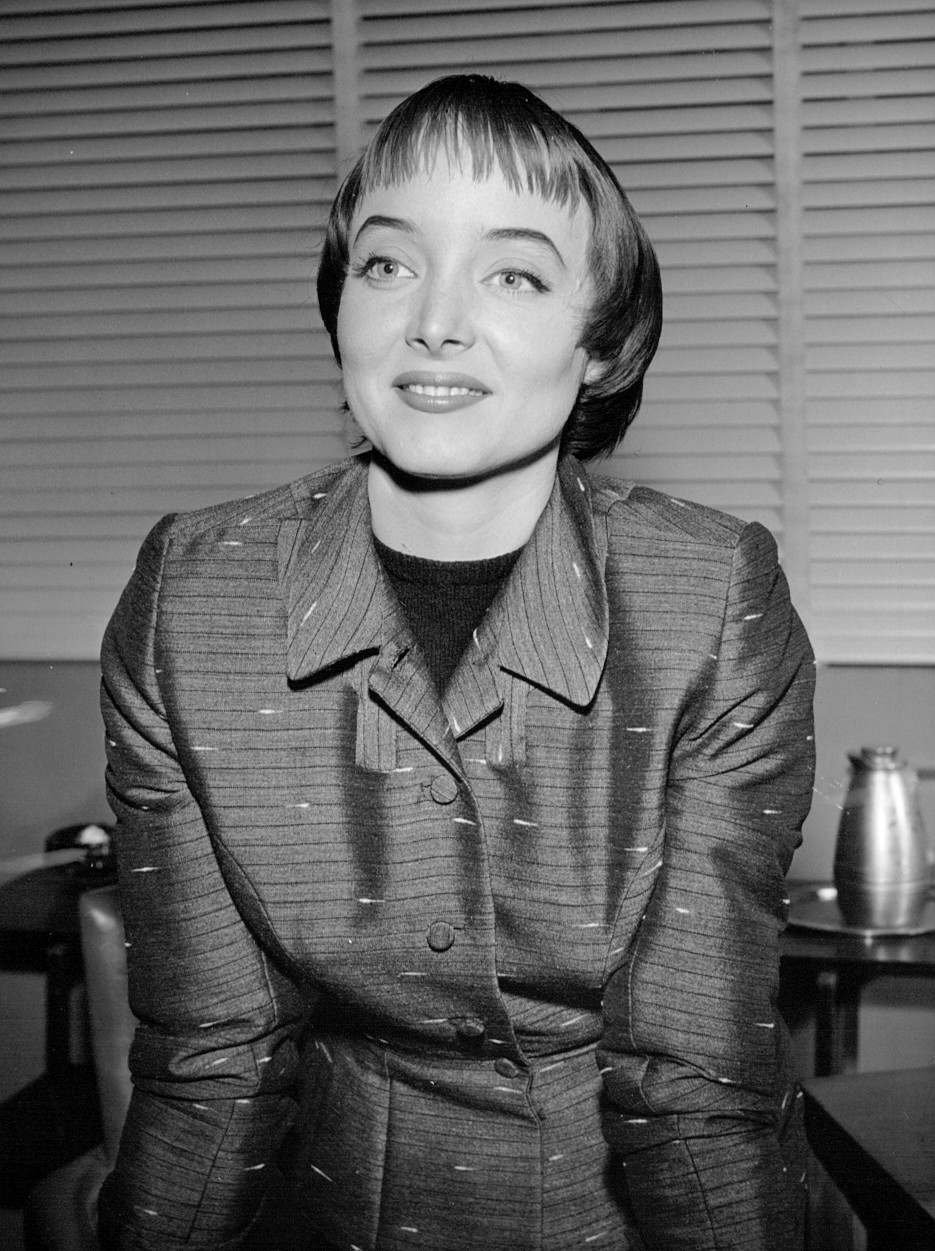
Carolyn Jones in a 1958 episode

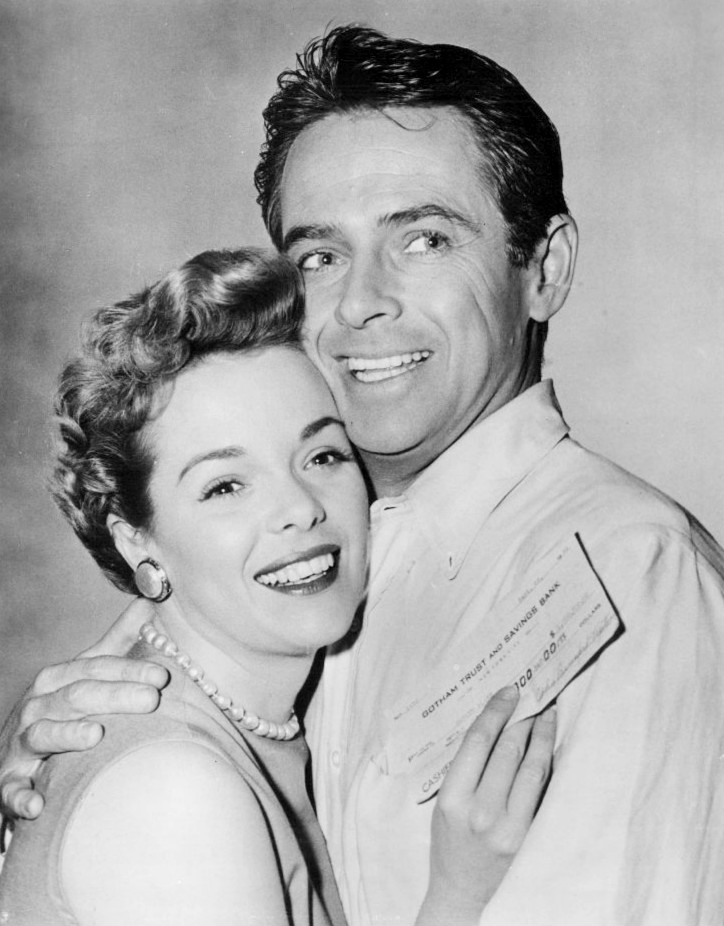
Nancy Gates and John Hudson, 1958

Following the commercial break, Anthony, back in the present and behind his desk, would introduce the week's millionaire.

Exactly how Tipton chose whom to make an instant millionaire was never necessarily disclosed, although Tipton made it plain in the show's first episode exactly what his intentions were. Saying that he wanted to set up a new kind of chess game, "with human beings," Tipton told Anthony:

I'm going to choose a number of people for my chessmen, and give them each a million dollars. No one is ever to know that I am the donor.

After showing the beneficiary in a typical situation for a few minutes at the beginning of the episode, Anthony would arrive, deliver the check, and have the beneficiary sign a legal statement binding him or her never to reveal the source of this million-dollar gift except to a spouse (if the recipient was single, Anthony would add, "... should you marry"), under penalty of forfeit. Once the document was signed and the thanks were given, Anthony disappeared from the beneficiary's life, never to return. The remainder of the episode showed how the gift affected the beneficiary.

The beneficiaries were not always poor but could be from any social class or occupation, from secretaries, salespeople, and construction workers to professionals like doctors, lawyers, even writers. Nor were they always likely to find their lives changed for the better because of their sudden wealth. In one episode, "The Jerry Bell Story", Charles Bronson played a once-lonely writer who first invests some of his unexpected fortune in the surgery to restore his blind fiancée's (Georgeann Johnson) eyesight, only to disappear at the moment her bandages were removed, fearful she would reject him because of his plain looks.

The series ran for 207 episodes, and Tipton made 206 millionaires. (One recipient returned the money.) However, the amount Tipton invested in his hobby was much more than $206 million, since, as Anthony told the recipient each week, "The taxes have already been paid."

=== The exceptions ===
Tipton did meet one beneficiary, a man condemned to be executed for a crime he never committed. He used a portion of his million-dollar gift to prove his innocence, with direct help from Michael Anthony, the only time Anthony stayed in even the periphery of a beneficiary's life.

Tipton visited the man as he was about to leave prison, though he was shown in his customary position: from behind, only his hand or arm and a brief glimpse of the top of his head in view. The only other time Tipton was seen in any episode, beyond his presentation of Anthony with the next check to deliver, was one in which Anthony was arrested and needed Tipton to bail him out so that he could finish the mission.

In another episode, Anthony said that the beneficiary "got the money, all right ... but not from me." Anthony was on his way to deliver the check when he was run down in a street accident, and the check was jarred loose from his possession. It made its way around a few stunned townspeople before it finally reached its rightful owner, offering a short study of those people's reactions to instant wealth as well as the intended recipient's.

In the first episode, during which Tipton explained to Anthony his human chess match, the recipient—a young woman who worked as a sales clerk—actually returned the bulk of her unexpected fortune, saying it wasn't worth allowing her husband-to-be to feel like a "kept man."

== End of production ==
The Millionaire ceased regular series production in 1960, its final regular episode, "The Patricia Collins Story", airing June 7, 1960, and its final summer reruns in its regular production time slot appearing that September. The show became a familiar presence in syndicated reruns from the 1960s through the 1980s, both on its original network, CBS, and on numerous regional independent stations. In 1999, the TV Land cable channel aired a few selected episodes. The show was never officially released on home video. CBS also aired daytime reruns in the early 1960s, with Bern Bennett being the live announcer for these. The Millionaire also aired on ABC in Australia on January 2, 1959.

In 2015, the series began to air on CBS's digital subchannel network Decades, and indeed, it unofficially launched the network on January 16, 2015, as part of the network's "countdown" to its Memorial Day launch, where 186 out of the 207 episodes of the series (along with others on the Decades schedule) were screened back-to-back consecutively. Nineteen episodes were excluded from airing, and according to CBS Television Distribution, these episodes were also removed from syndication. The show had formerly aired on Weigel Broadcasting's Heroes & Icons weekdays from 5:00am to 6:00am EST, but was later removed in the first quarter of 2015.

Up until 2019, the show was not transmitted regularly on any television network. It played on Decades every weekday from 6am to 7am until March 24, 2023; Decades rebranded as Catchy Comedy on March 27, 2023.

Creator and producer Don Fedderson later produced a TV movie version of The Millionaire with Martin Balsam as Arthur Haines and Robert Quarry as Michael Anthony. The movie was intended as a backdoor pilot for a revival series, which never occurred.

== Guest stars ==
Since each episode featured a different beneficiary, many guest stars appeared during The Millionaire's production, including Richard Anderson, Raymond Bailey, Joanna Barnes, Patricia Barry, Orson Bean, Jacques Bergerac, Charles Bronson, Edgar Buchanan, Carleton Carpenter, John Carradine, Marguerite Chapman, Richard Collier, Chuck Connors, Mike Connors, Richard H. Cutting, Royal Dano, Richard Deacon, Angie Dickinson, Mason Alan Dinehart, Barbara Eden, Michael Emmet, Yvonne Lime Fedderson, Virginia Field, Dick Foran, Reginald Gardiner, Beverly Garland, Lisa Gaye, James Gleason, John Goddard, Don Gordon, Frank Gorshin, Peter Graves, George Grizzard, Harry Guardino, Alan Hale Jr., Barbara Hale, Murray Hamilton, Michael Hinn, Rex Holman, Dennis Hopper, William Hopper, Frieda Inescort, David Janssen, Anthony Jochim, DeForest Kelley, Jack Kelly, Robert Knapp, Tom Laughlin, Maureen Leeds, Nan Leslie, Margaret Lindsay, Jack Lord, Celia Lovsky, Nora Marlowe, Frank McHugh, Joyce Meadows, Lee Meriwether, Martin Milner, Mary Tyler Moore, Joanna Moore, Agnes Moorehead, Rita Moreno, Vic Morrow, Lori Nelson, Kathy Nolan, Susan Oliver, Patrick O'Neal, Larry Pennell, Paul Picerni, Denver Pyle, Stephen Roberts, John Smith, Kent Smith, Aaron Spelling, Olive Sturgess, Marshall Thompson, Regis Toomey, Ernest Truex, Robert Vaughn, Betty White, Grant Williams, Wilson Wood and Dick York.

At least two professional athletes appeared on the show: basketball and baseball player Chuck Connors (who also had a career as an actor) and Hall of Fame baseball pitcher Don Drysdale.

== Episodes ==
=== Season 1 (1955) ===
No. overall	No. in season	Title	Directed by	Written by	Original release date
1	1	"The Amy Moore Story"	Alfred E. Green	Story by : George Van Marter; Teleplay by : Mary C. McCall Jr.	January 19, 1955
2	2	"The Carl Nelson Story"	Unknown	Charles Hoffman	January 26, 1955
3	3	"The Joe Iris Story"	William A. Seiter	James R. Webb	February 2, 1955
4	4	"The Dan Mulcahy Story"	Alfred E. Green	Mary C. McCall Jr.	February 9, 1955
5	5	"The Emily Short Story"	Alfred E. Green	Bert Granet	February 16, 1955
6	6	"The Margaret Browning Story"	Alfred E. Green	Mary C. McCall Jr.	February 23, 1955
7	7	"The Harvey Blake Story"	Edward Bernds	Eldon Packard and Stanley Davis	March 2, 1955
8	8	"The Nancy Marlborough Story"	Alfred E. Green	Milton M. Raison	March 9, 1955
9	9	"The Betty Jane Ryan Story"	William A. Seiter	Eric Freiwald and Robert C. Schaefer	March 16, 1955
10	10	"The Charles Lomar Story"	Alfred E. Green	Jack Jacobs and Malvin Wald	March 23, 1955
11	11	"The Ken Fowler Story"	Alfred E. Green	David Chandler	March 30, 1955
12	12	"The Pev Johnson Story"	Jules Bricken	Milton Raison	April 6, 1955
13	13	"The Quentin Harwood Story"	William A. Seiter	Seeleg Lester	April 13, 1955
14	14	"The Fred Malcolm Story"	Charles F. Haas	Muriel Roy Bolton	April 20, 1955
15	15	"The Luke Fortune Story"	Alfred E. Green	Mary McCall Jr.	April 27, 1955
16	16	"The Jack Martin Story"	Charles F. Haas	Story by : Robert Clayton; Teleplay by : Jack Leonard	May 4, 1955
17	17	"The Walter Carter Story"	Unknown	Frank Gill Jr., Phil Cole, and Dick Pedicini	May 11, 1955
18	18	"The Merle Roberts Story"	Unknown	Mary McCall Jr.	May 18, 1955
19	19	"The Uncle Robby Story"	Charles F. Haas	Story by : Steven David; Teleplay by : Seeleg Lester	May 25, 1955
20	20	"The Sam Donovan Story"	Unknown	Jackson Gillis	June 1, 1955
21	21	"The Vickie Lawson Story"	Alfred E. Green	Story by : David Chandler; Teleplay by : David Chandler and Mary C. McCall Jr.	June 8, 1955
22	22	"The Cobb Marley Story"	Harry Keller	Story by : Milton Raison; Teleplay by : Robert Clayton and Milton Raison	June 15, 1955
23	23	"The Mildred Milliken Story"	Alfred E. Green	Story by : Polly James; Teleplay by : Charles Hoffman	June 22, 1955

=== Season 2 (1955–56) ===
No. overall	No. in season	Title	Directed by	Written by	Original release date
24	1	"The Rita Keeley Story"	Alfred E. Green	Mary C. McCall Jr.	September 28, 1955
25	2	"The Robert Croft Story"	Harry Keller	Story by : Ray Wander; Teleplay by : David Chandler	October 5, 1955
26	3	"The Joe Seaton Story"	William A. Seiter	Jack Townley	October 12, 1955
27	4	"The Iris Millar Story"	Leslie H. Martinson	David Chandler	October 19, 1955
28	5	"The Ralph McKnight Story"	William A. Seiter	George Tibbles	October 26, 1955
29	6	"The Tom Bryan Story"	Alfred E. Green	Story by : Fred Schiller; Teleplay by : Mary C. McCall Jr.	November 2, 1955
30	7	"The Peggy Demos Story"	Alfred E. Green	Mary C. McCall Jr.	November 9, 1955
31	8	"The Jerome Wilson Story"	William A. Seiter	George Tibbles	November 16, 1955
32	9	"The Nora Paul Story"	Alfred E. Green	Josef Montaigue	November 23, 1955
33	10	"The Steve Carey Story"	Leslie H. Martinson	Hobart Donavan	November 30, 1955
34	11	"The Don Lewis Story"	Alfred E. Green	Mary C. McCall Jr.	December 7, 1955
35	12	"The Jeff Ellis Story"	Leslie H. Martinson	Barry Trivers	December 14, 1955
36	13	"The Wilbur T. Gerrold Story"	Unknown	David Chandler	December 21, 1955
37	14	"The Philip Sargent Story"	Leslie H. Martinson	Story by : Irma Kalish; Teleplay by : Seeleg Lester	December 28, 1955
38	15	"The Chris Hall Story"	Sobey Martin	Story by : Lawrence L. Goldman; Teleplay by : Robert Creighton Williams	January 4, 1956
39	16	"The Reverend John Hardin Story"	Alfred E. Green	Story by : George Carleton Brown and Frank Gill Jr. Teleplay by : Milton M. Raison	January 11, 1956
40	17	"The Cindy Bowen Story"	Leslie H. Martinson	Lee Erwin	January 18, 1956
41	18	"The Jean Griffith Story"	Alfred E. Green	Seeleg Lester	January 25, 1956
42	19	"The Larry Evans Story"	Leslie H. Martinson	Robert Creighton Williams	February 1, 1956
43	20	"The Brian Hendricks Story"	Sobey Martin	Muriel R. Bolton	February 8, 1956
44	21	"The Arthur Darner Story"	Gerald Mayer	Jo Pagano	February 15, 1956
45	22	"The Victor Volante Story"	Alfred E. Green	Story by : Frank Cavett; Teleplay by : Mary C. McCall Jr.	February 22, 1956
46	23	"The Candy Caldwell Story"	Alfred E. Green	Story by : Josef Montaigue; Teleplay by : Mary C. McCall Jr.	February 29, 1956
47	24	"The Rip Matson Story"	Charles F. Haas	Lee Erwin and Mary C. McCall Jr.	March 7, 1956
48	25	"The Rita Hanley Story"	Gerald Mayer	Al C. Ward	March 14, 1956
49	26	"The Eric Vincent Story"	James Sheldon	Story by : David Chandler; Teleplay by : Muriel R. Bolton	March 21, 1956
50	27	"The Bedelia Buckley Story"	Alfred E. Green	Barry Trivers	March 28, 1956
51	28	"The Tom Mead Story"	Sobey Martin	Story by : Gene Wang; Teleplay by : Al C. Ward	April 4, 1956
52	29	"The Lucky Swanson Story"	Alfred E. Green	Story by : Ruth Weddle; Teleplay by : Doris Gilbert	April 11, 1956
53	30	"The Jane Costello Story"	Alfred E. Green	Doris Gilbert	April 18, 1956
54	31	"The Ed Murdock Story"	Harry Keller	Harold Jack Bloom	April 25, 1956
55	32	"The Louise Williams Story"	Anton Leader	Muriel Roy Bolton	May 2, 1956
56	33	"The Todd Burke Story"	Alfred E. Green	Mary C. McCall Jr.	May 9, 1956
57	34	"The Captain John Carroll Story"	Harry Keller	Lee Erwin	May 16, 1956
58	35	"The Sally Delaney Story"	Gerald Mayer	Story by : Leonard Neubauer; Teleplay by : Doris Gilbert	May 23, 1956
59	36	"The Olivia Grainger Story"	Alfred E. Green	Story by : Paul de Sainte Colombe; Teleplay by : Al C. Ward	May 30, 1956
60	37	"The Jill Mayfield Story"	Harry Keller	Joe Morhaim	June 6, 1956

=== Season 3 (1956–57) ===
No. overall	No. in season	Title	Directed by	Written by	Original release date
61	1	"The Kathy Munson Story"	Alfred E. Green	Robert Bassing	September 12, 1956
62	2	"The Jane Carr Story"	Gerald Mayer	Leonard Neubauer	September 19, 1956
63	3	"The Anna Hartley Story"	Harry Keller	Story by : Josef Montiague; Teleplay by : Doris Hursley, Frank Hursley, and Milton Raison	September 26, 1956
64	4	"The Charles Hartford Story"	Gerald Mayer	Danny Arnold	October 3, 1956
65	5	"The Fred Graham Story"	Alfred E. Green	Mary C. McCall Jr.	October 10, 1956
66	6	"The Virginia Lennart Story"	James V. Kern	Muriel Roy Bolton	October 17, 1956
67	7	"The Denny Havens Story"	Unknown	Story by : Phil Cole and Ed Nathan; Teleplay by : Barry Trivers	October 24, 1956
68	8	"The Joey Diamond Story"	John Brahm	Story by : Aileen Hamilton; Teleplay by : Al C. Ward	October 31, 1956
69	9	"The David Tremayne Story"	Gerald Mayer	Story by : Charles R. Marion; Teleplay by : Al C. Ward	November 7, 1956
70	10	"The Waldo Francis Turner Story"	Alfred E. Green	Story by : Wellyn Totman; Teleplay by : Seeleg Lester	November 14, 1956
71	11	"The Jay Powers Story"	John Brahm	Story by : Jack Townley; Teleplay by : Muriel Roy Bolton	November 21, 1956
72	12	"The Harvey Borden Story"	Gerald Mayer	Karl Brown	November 28, 1956
73	13	"The Valerie Hunt Story"	Alfred E. Green	Jack Hanley	December 5, 1956
74	14	"The Salvatore Michelangelo Buonarotti"	James V. Kern	Danny Arnold	December 12, 1956
75	15	"The Mildred Kester Story"	Gerald Mayer	Ed Adamson	December 19, 1956
76	16	"The Betty Perkins Story"	Alfred E. Green	Dick Stenger	December 26, 1956
77	17	"The Nick Cannon Story"	Alfred E. Green	Leonard Neubauer	January 2, 1957
78	18	"The Nancy Wellington Story"	Alfred E. Green	Story by : Wellyn Totman; Teleplay by : Carolyn Slade	January 9, 1957
79	19	"The Russell Herbert Story"	Gerald Mayer	Jo Pagano	January 16, 1957
80	20	"The Anton Bohrman Story"	Alfred E. Green	Barry Trivers	January 23, 1957
81	21	"The Charles Wyatt Story"	Gerald Mayer	Story by : Walter Goetz; Teleplay by : Muriel Roy Bolton	January 30, 1957
82	22	"The Jim Driskill Story"	Gerald Mayer	Jerry Adelman	February 6, 1957
83	23	"The Professor Amberson Adams Story"	Alfred E. Green	Story by : Howard Estabrook; Teleplay by : Barry Trivers	February 13, 1957
84	24	"The Judge William Westholme Story"	Sobey Martin	Barry Trivers	February 20, 1957
85	25	"The Jerry Bell Story"	Alfred E. Green	Jerry Adelman	February 27, 1957
86	26	"The Jerry Patterson Story"	Sobey Martin	Jerry Adelman	March 6, 1957
87	27	"The Jimmy Reilly Story"	Gerald Mayer	Jo Pagano	March 13, 1957
88	28	"The Rose Russell Story"	Unknown	Jerry Adelman	March 27, 1957
89	29	"The Doctor Alan March Story"	Alfred E. Green	Story by : Lou Morheim; Teleplay by : Jo Pagano	April 3, 1957
90	30	"The Crystal Sands Story"	Charles F. Haas	Story by : Frank and Doris Hursley; Teleplay by : Jerry Adelman	April 10, 1957
91	31	"The Maggie Sheeler Story"	Alfred E. Green	Ellis Marcus and Lester A. White	April 17, 1957
92	32	"The Carol Wesley Story"	Gerald Mayer	Ed Adamson	April 24, 1957
93	33	"The Hub Grimes Story"	John Brahm	Story by : Teleplay by : Frank and Doris Hursley	May 1, 1957
94	34	"The Chris Daniels Story"	Alfred E. Green	Howard J. Green	May 8, 1957
95	35	"The Josef Marton Story"	James V. Kern	Story by : Wesley Haynes; Teleplay by : Barry Trivers	May 15, 1957
96	36	"The Ted McAllister Story"	James V. Kern	Story by : Teleplay by : Muriel Roy Bolton and Wesley Haynes	May 22, 1957
97	37	"The Dan Larsen Story"	Alfred E. Green	Story by : Jo Pagano and Fred Schiller; Teleplay by : Jo Pagano and Fred Schiller	May 29, 1957
98	38	"The Diane Loring Story"	Alfred E. Green	Endre Bohem and Louis Vittes	June 5, 1957
99	39	"The Bob Fielding Story"	Alfred E. Green	Lowell S. Hawley	June 12, 1957

=== Season 4 (1957–58) ===
No. overall	No. in season	Title	Directed by	Written by	Original release date
100	1	"The Matt Kirby Story"	Gerald Mayer	Story by : Joe Morheim; Teleplay by : Muriel Roy Bolton	September 18, 1957
101	2	"The Peter Marlowe Story"	Gerald Mayer	Story by : Josef Montaigue; Teleplay by : Robert Creighton Williams and Josef Montaigue	September 25, 1957
102	3	"The Roy Delbridge Story"	Gerald Mayer	Robert Leslie Bellem and DeVallon Scott	October 2, 1957
103	4	"The Carl Bronson Story"	Alfred E. Green	Marie Baumer	October 9, 1957
104	5	"The Laura Hunter Story"	Gerald Mayer	Muriel Roy Bolton	October 16, 1957
105	6	"The Larry Parker Story"	Alfred E. Green	Story by : Ira V. Adkins; Teleplay by : Jo Pagano	October 23, 1957
106	7	"The Ruth Ferris Story"	John Peyser	Ed Adamson	October 30, 1957
107	8	"The Hap Connolly Story"	Alfred E. Green	Jack Roche	November 13, 1957
108	9	"The Frank Keegan Story"	Unknown	Ed Adamson	November 20, 1957
109	10	"The Steve Logan Story"	Gerald Mayer	Story by : Jack Roche; Teleplay by :	November 27, 1957
110	11	"The Anitra Dellano Story"	Alfred E. Green	Jo Pagano	December 4, 1957
111	12	"The Hugh Waring Story"	Gerald Mayer	Story by : June Purcell; Teleplay by : Muriel Roy Bolton	December 11, 1957
112	13	"The Barbara Lydon Story"	R.G. Springsteen	Jack Laird and Wilton Schiller	December 18, 1957
113	14	"The Regina Wainwright Story"	James Sheldon	Jerry Adelman	December 25, 1957
114	15	"The Rod Matthews Story"	James Sheldon	Story by : John Fulton and John Stephens; Teleplay by : Muriel Roy Bolton	January 1, 1958
115	16	"The Marjorie Martinson Story"	Alfred E. Green	Story by : Albert Aley; Teleplay by : Jo Pagano	January 8, 1958
116	17	"The Peter Bartley Story"	Robert Altman	Jack Laird and Paul Savage	January 15, 1958
117	18	"The Jonathan Bookman Story"	James V. Kern	Story by : Seeleg Lester; Teleplay by : Muriel Roy Bolton	January 22, 1958
118	19	"The Doris Winslow Story"	Alfred E. Green	Story by : Howard Estabrook; Teleplay by : Muriel Roy Bolton	January 29, 1958
119	20	"The Michael Holm Story"	John Peyser	Story by : Fred Shevin; Teleplay by : Muriel Roy Bolton	February 5, 1958
120	21	"The Martha Crockett Story"	Gerald Mayer	Dory Previn and Barbara Merlin	February 12, 1958
121	22	"The John Richards Story"	John Peyser	Marie Baumer	February 26, 1958
122	23	"The Johanna Judson Story"	James Sheldon	DeVallon Scott	March 5, 1958
123	24	"The Raymond Dupar Story"	John Peyser	Dory Previn and Barbara Merlin	March 12, 1958
124	25	"The Neal Bowers Story"	Alfred E. Green	Jo Pagano	March 19, 1958
125	26	"The John Smith Story"	Gerald Mayer	Muriel Roy Bolton	March 26, 1958
126	27	"The Susan Birchard Story"	R.G. Springsteen	Gail Ingram and DeVallon Scott	April 2, 1958
127	28	"The Tony Drummond Story"	James Sheldon	Story by : Paul Franklin; Teleplay by : Jack Roche	April 9, 1958
128	29	"The Thorne Sisters Story"	John Peyser	Story by : Elizabeth Coulson; Teleplay by : Jack Roche	April 16, 1958
129	30	"The Rafe Peterson Story"	James Sheldon	Lee Loeb	April 23, 1958
130	31	"The Andrew Sterling Story"	James Sheldon	Teddi Sherman	April 30, 1958
131	32	"The Wally Bannister Story"	Gerald Mayer	Story by : Stuart Palmer; Teleplay by : Muriel Roy Bolton	May 7, 1958
132	33	"The Jack Garrison Story"	John Peyser	Jerry Adelman	May 14, 1958
133	34	"The Paul Naylor Story"	James Sheldon	Story by : Isabel Gilbert; Teleplay by : Muriel Roy Bolton	May 21, 1958
134	35	"The Russ White Story"	Alfred E. Green	Lawrence L. Goldman	May 28, 1958

=== Season 5 (1958–59) ===
No. overall	No. in season	Title	Directed by	Written by	Original release date
135	1	"The Betty Hawley Story"	John Peyser	Jerry Adelman	September 3, 1958
136	2	"The Norman Conover Story"	James Sheldon	Halsey Melone	September 10, 1958
137	3	"The Fred Morgan Story"	James Sheldon	Lawrence L. Goldman	September 17, 1958
138	4	"The Ken Leighton Story"	James Sheldon	Gail Ingram	September 24, 1958
139	5	"The David Barrett Story"	James Sheldon	Story by : Jerry Adelman; Teleplay by : Jack Laird and Wilton Schiller	October 1, 1958
140	6	"The Martin Scott Story"	John Peyser	Story by : David Chandler; Teleplay by : Muriel Roy Bolton	October 8, 1958
141	7	"The Ellen Curry Story"	James Sheldon	Lawrence L. Goldman	October 15, 1958
142	8	"The William Vaughan Story"	James Sheldon	Story by : Gena Canestrari; Teleplay by : Muriel Roy Bolton	October 22, 1958
143	9	"Ralph the Cat"	John Peyser	Jack Roche	October 29, 1958
144	10	"The Dan Howell Story"	Robert Altman	Hal Fimberg and Frank Waldman	November 5, 1958
145	11	"The Newman Johnson Story"	James Sheldon	Leonard Kantor	November 12, 1958
146	12	"The Lee Randolph Story"	James Sheldon	Lawrence L. Goldman	November 19, 1958
147	13	"The Frank Harrigan Story"	James Sheldon	Jack Roche	December 3, 1958
148	14	"The Pete Hopper Story"	Robert Altman	Samuel Newman	December 10, 1958
149	15	"The Eric Lodek Story"	James Sheldon	Jack Hanley	December 17, 1958
150	16	"The William Courtney Story"	James Sheldon	Robert Leslie Bellem and Whitney Ellsworth	January 7, 1959
151	17	"The Terrence Costigan Story"	James Sheldon	Story by : Besse Zuckerman; Teleplay by : Jack Laird	January 14, 1959
152	18	"The Irene Marshall Story"	John Peyser	Muriel Roy Bolton and Lawrence L. Goldman	January 21, 1959
153	19	"The Julia Conrad Story"	James Sheldon	Gavin Lambert, Peggy O'Shea, Lou Shaw, and Ellis St. Joseph	January 29, 1959
154	20	"The Emily Baker Story"	John Peyser	Lorraine Edwards	February 4, 1959
155	21	"The John Rackham Story"	James Sheldon	Story by : Jo Pagano; Teleplay by : Muriel Roy Bolton and Jo Pagano	February 11, 1959
156	22	"The Father Gilhooley Story"	James V. Kern	David Boehm	February 18, 1959
157	23	"The Hank Butler Story"	Robert Altman	Gail Ingram	February 25, 1959
158	24	"The Charlie Weber Story"	Robert Altman	Story by : Mel Durslag; Teleplay by : Douglas Morrow	March 4, 1959
159	25	"The Angela Temple Story"	Robert Altman	Jack Laird	March 11, 1959
160	26	"The Alicia Osante Story"	James Sheldon	Robert Altman and John T. Kelley	March 18, 1959
161	27	"The Marcia Forrest Story"	James Sheldon	Lawrence Menkin	March 25, 1959
162	28	"The Henry Banning Story"	Robert Altman	Robert Altman and John T. Kelley	April 1, 1959
163	29	"The Sally Simms Story"	James Sheldon	Muriel Roy Bolton and Jo Pagano	April 8, 1959
164	30	"The Ann Griffin Story"	James Sheldon	Story by : David Boehm; Teleplay by : Muriel Roy Bolton	April 15, 1959
165	31	"The Karl Miller Story"	Robert Altman	Gail Ingram	April 22, 1959
166	32	"The Gilbert Burton Story"	James Sheldon	Jack Roche	April 29, 1959
167	33	"The Susan Ballard Story"	John Peyser	Gail Ingram	May 6, 1959
168	34	"The Bill Franklin Story"	James Sheldon	Muriel Roy Bolton and Barney Slater	May 13, 1959
169	35	"The Louise Benson Story"	James Sheldon	Jo Pagano	May 20, 1959
170	36	"The Martha Halloran Story"	James Sheldon	James Bloodworth	May 27, 1959
171	37	"The Charles Bradwell Story"	James Sheldon	Al C. Ward	June 10, 1959

=== Season 6 (1959–60) ===
No. overall	No. in season	Title	Directed by	Written by	Original release date
172	1	"The Mark Fleming Story"	James Sheldon	Muriel Roy Bolton	September 15, 1959
173	2	"The Harry Brown Story"	James Sheldon	Lorraine Edwards	September 22, 1959
174	3	"The Lorraine Daggett Story"	John Peyser	Story by : Robert Altman; Teleplay by : John T. Kelley	September 29, 1959
175	4	"The Phillip Burnell Story"	James Sheldon	Muriel Roy Bolton	October 6, 1959
176	5	"The Doctor Joseph Frye Story"	Robert Altman	John T. Kelley	October 13, 1959
177	6	"The Jim Hayes Story"	James Sheldon	Gail Ingram	October 27, 1959
178	7	"The Maureen Reynolds Story"	Robert Altman	Muriel Roy Bolton	November 3, 1959
179	8	"The Jeff Mercer Story"	James V. Kern	Stephen Kandel	November 10, 1959
180	9	"The Tom Hampton Story"	James V. Kern	Lorraine Edwards	November 18, 1959
181	10	"The Sergeant Matthew Brogan Story"	Robert Altman	Jack Roche	November 24, 1959
182	11	"The Mitchell Gunther Story"	Robert Ellis Miller	Muriel Roy Bolton	December 1, 1959
183	12	"The Andrew C. Cooley Story"	Robert Altman	Robert Altman	December 8, 1959
184	13	"The Nancy Pearson Story"	Unknown	Stephen Kandel	December 15, 1959
185	14	"The Jackson Greene Story"	Robert Altman	Jack Marlowe	December 22, 1959
186	15	"The Timothy Mackail Story"	Robert Altman	Muriel Roy Bolton	December 29, 1959
187	16	"The Elizabeth Tander Story"	James Sheldon	Jack Marlowe	January 5, 1960
188	17	"The Sylvia Merrick Story"	Joe Parker	Muriel Roy Bolton	January 12, 1960
189	18	"The Whitney Ames Story"	James Sheldon	Story by : Robert Ellis Miller; Teleplay by : Muriel Roy Bolton	January 19, 1960
190	19	"The Janie Harris Story"	Joe Parker	Betty Andrews Blunt	January 26, 1960
191	20	"The Margaret Stoneham Story"	James Sheldon	Jack Roche	February 2, 1960
192	21	"The Jerry Mitchell Story"	James Sheldon	Story by : Jack Laird; Teleplay by : Muriel Roy Bolton	February 9, 1960
193	22	"The Sandy Newell Story"	Joe Parker	James Bloodworth	February 16, 1960
194	23	"The Larry Maxwell Story"	James Sheldon	Jack Marlowe	March 1, 1960
195	24	"The Karen Summers Story"	James Sheldon	Aline Degrandchamp and Stephen Kandel	March 8, 1960
196	25	"The Jessica March Story"	Lee Sholem	Story by : John Stephens; Teleplay by : Muriel Roy Bolton	March 15, 1960
197	26	"The Julie Sherman Story"	James Sheldon	Story by : Sloan Nibley; Teleplay by : Muriel Roy Bolton	March 22, 1960
198	27	"The Tony Rogers Story"	James Sheldon	Stephen Kandel	March 29, 1960
199	28	"The Susan Johnson Story"	Dick Darley	Jack Marlowe	April 5, 1960
200	29	"The Nancy Cortez Story"	James Sheldon	Estelle Conde and Jan Winters	April 12, 1960
201	30	"The Katherine Boland Story"	Dick Darley	Marvin C. Johnson	April 19, 1960
202	31	"The Mara Robinson Story"	James Sheldon	Story by : Betty Ulius; Teleplay by : Muriel Roy Bolton and Betty Ulius	April 26, 1960
203	32	"The Dixon Cooper Story"	James Sheldon	Story by : Jack Marlowe; Teleplay by : Muriel Roy Bolton	May 3, 1960
204	33	"The Vance Ludlow Story"	James Sheldon	Story by : James Bloodworth; Teleplay by : Muriel Roy Bolton	May 10, 1960
205	34	"The Peter Longman Story"	John Peyser	Betty A. Blunt	May 24, 1960
206	35	"The Maggie Dalton Story"	James Sheldon	Bertrand Casrelli and Richard Kayne	May 31, 1960
207	36	"The Patricia Collins Story"	James Sheldon	Lorraine Edwards	June 7, 1960

== Parodies ==
The Millionaire was parodied in a 1958 episode of The Jack Benny Program, in which Dennis Day became a Tipton beneficiary, with Marvin Miller as Michael Anthony delivering the unexpected gift.

During its fourth season, The Twilight Zone was expanded to an hour. Rod Serling, upset at this change, wrote an episode that season called "The Bard" about a hack television writer who was unable to come up with anything good until he inadvertently summoned the ghost of William Shakespeare. One of his bad ideas was an in-joke ... "We take The Millionaire, expand it to an hour, and call it The Multimillionaire!"

In 1978, the Canadian sketch comedy program SCTV produced a parody of the show called The $Millionaire. In it, Tipton (played by Joe Flaherty) has given away so much money over the years that he is practically broke. He now can only afford to give away $50 at a time, much to the embarrassment of Anthony (played by John Candy).

Mad Magazine included The Millionaire in a parody article during the run of the show. Miller's character approaches a subject and says, "My name is Michael Anthony, and I have been authorized to give you one million dollars!" The man tears up the check, saying, "My name is Mike Todd, and I don't need it!"

In the sitcom Cheers, the episode "How to Marry a Mailman" opens with Norm Peterson and Cliff Clavin explaining The Millionaire and its premise to multi-millionaire Robin Colcord in an effort to get Colcord to give them a million dollars.

== Similar productions ==
The 1932 film If I Had a Million involves a dying businessman who leaves his money to eight strangers. The movie had seven directors and multiple screenwriters.

The 1983–1984 ABC-TV series Lottery! also explored sudden wealth and its impacts upon its beneficiaries, as did the NBC-TV shows Sweepstakes in 1979 and Windfall in 2006; all three had short runs. The 2013 television show Lucky 7 had an even shorter run.
