= Carl Spitz =

Dog trainer in Hollywood

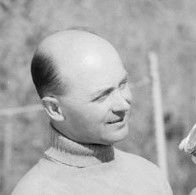
- Carl Spitz at his kennel the Hollywood Dog Training School
- Born: August 26, 1894; Germany
- Died: September 15, 1976 (aged 82); Los Angeles, California, U.S.
- Burial place: Forest Lawn Memorial Park Cemetery
- Occupation: Dog trainer
- Years active: 1926–1976

Carl Spitz (August 26, 1894 – September 15, 1976) was a German dog trainer who worked in Hollywood. He was most famous for owning and training the female Cairn Terrier Terry, who portrayed Toto in the 1939 MGM fantasy film The Wizard of Oz. Spitz used a special method of working with acting animals on set.

== Career ==
Spitz was born in Germany where he trained military and police dogs in WWI. Spitz emigrated to the United States in 1926 and opened the Hollywood Dog Training School. His school was located on Riverside Drive in North Hollywood. Terry, the dog who portrayed Toto, spent her later years at Spitz's Hollywood Dog Training School and when she passed, was buried in a pet cemetery on his property. Spitz also trained Buck, the St. Bernard from the movie Call of the Wild, starring Clark Gable. Spitz would later go on to become the man responsible for setting up America's WWII War-Dog Program. He appeared on You Bet Your Life on 22 February 1950, where he states that he was from "near Heidelberg".

Spitz died in 1976, in Los Angeles County, California at the age of 82 and was buried in Glendale's Forest Lawn Memorial Park Cemetery in the Great Mausoleum in the Iris Columbarium section.

== Training Methods ==
According to screenwriter Jane Hall, Spitz went through the book The Wonderful Wizard of Oz, “picking out whatever tricks or mannerisms Toto was supposed to have” and trained Terry accordingly.

During the filming of The Wizard of Oz (1939), Terry repeatedly attempted to bite at pieces of straw hanging from the Scarecrow's costume. Spitz explained to the director that erratic movement close to the ground triggered terrier's natural instinct to chase it. Thus, they modified the lower portion of the costume, allowing filming to continue.

Spitz developed the method of using silent hand signals to direct an animal. While in Germany, he trained under Konrad Most, a pioneer of dog training.

In the 1938 book, Training your Dog, co-written by Spitz and Bernard Molohon, Spitz described in a chapter how dogs could be trained to respond to silent cues. The process involved pairing repeated physical gestures with spoken commands and gradually reducing the verbal instructions until the dog responded to the gestures alone. Spitz also described an incident during the filming of River's End in which limited space on the set required him to give silent commands from underneath a bed.
