= George William Weidler =

American jazz saxophonist (1926–1989)

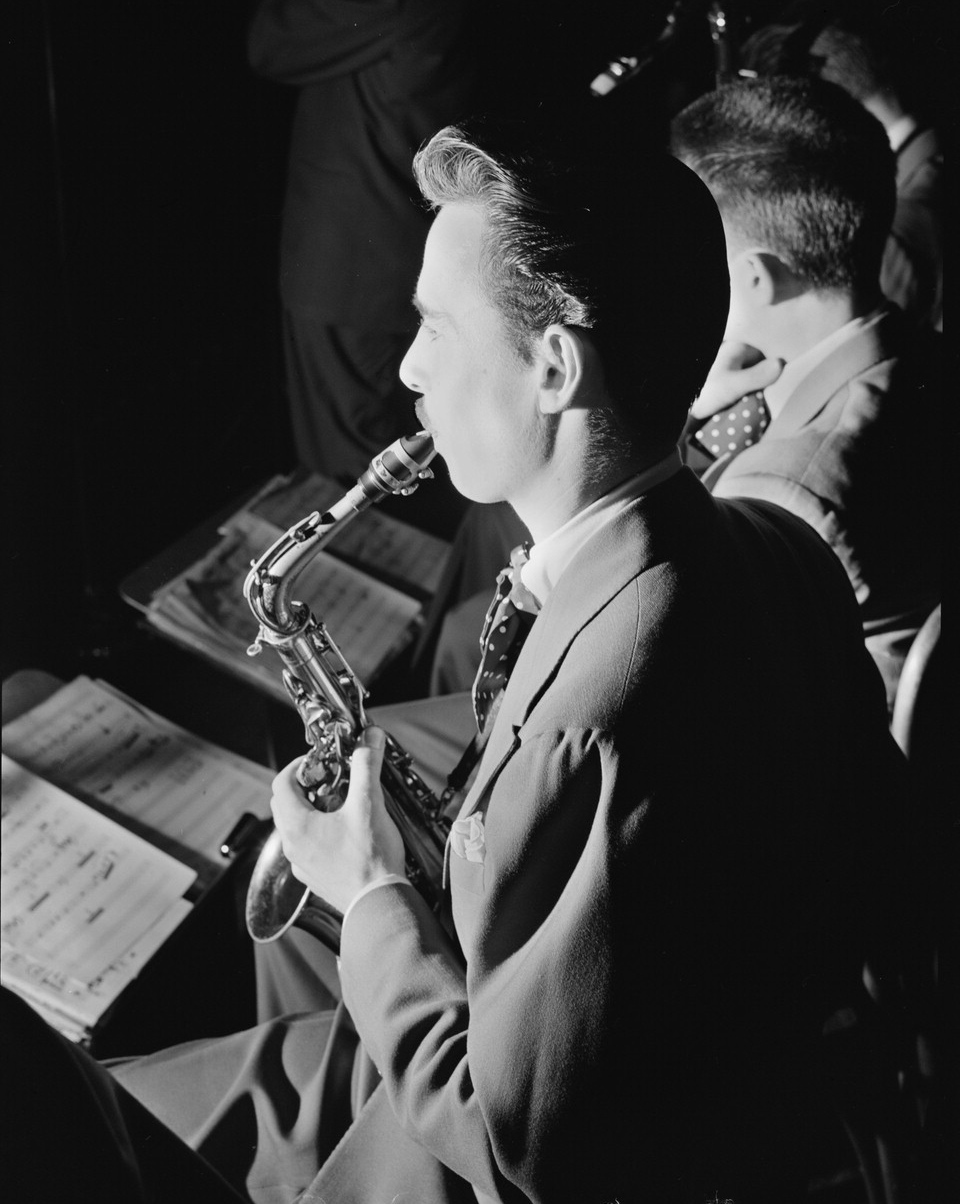
Weidler, c. 1947

George William Weidler (January 11, 1926 – December 27, 1989) was an American saxophonist and songwriter who was born and died in Los Angeles, California. He was the second husband of singer-actress Doris Day (married 1946–1949) and older brother of former child actress Virginia Weidler.

== Career ==
As sideman, Weidler recorded with Freddie Slack, Les Brown, Charlie Barnet, Ike Carpenter, The Delta Rhythm Boys, Stan Kenton, and the Metronome All-Stars. He is credited as having performed on over 57 jazz recordings between 1943 and 1948.

While with Charlie Barnet, his two brothers, Warner (born Werther; 1922–2010) and Walter (born Wolfgang; 1923–2002), both saxophonists, were with the band. From the early 1940s, the three also performed as the Weidler Brothers Orchestra until 1952, when they signed with Capitol Records as "The Wilder Brothers." Around 1950, the Weidler Brothers switched from jazz to pop.

== Selected discography ==
- The Weidler Brothers, Capitol Records 78–108 OCLC 732372074

Side A: "The Jolka Polka"
Side B: "The Schnitzelbank Polka"

With Stan Kenton

- Stan Kenton's Milestones (Capitol, 1943-47 [1950])
- Stan Kenton Classics (Capitol, 1944-47 [1952])
- Encores (Capitol, 1947)
- A Presentation of Progressive Jazz (Capitol, 1947)
- The Kenton Era (Capitol, 1940–54, [1955])

== Family ==
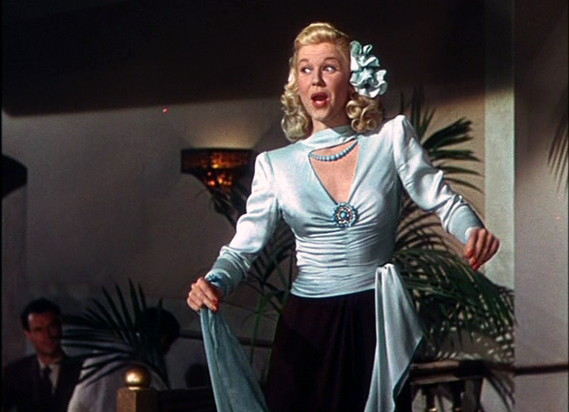
First wife Doris Day (m. 1946-49)

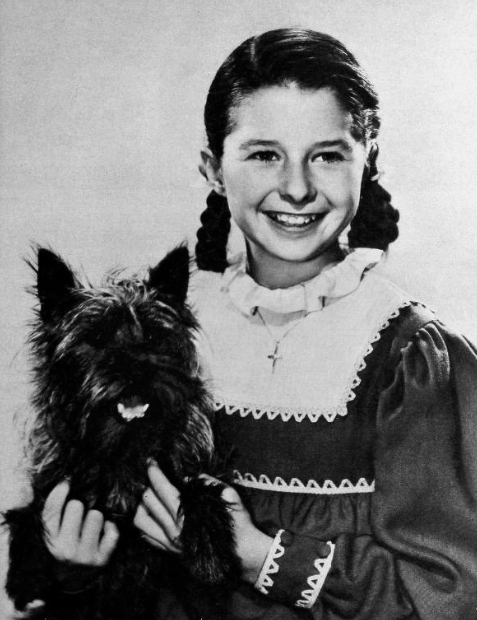
Sister Virginia Weidler, with Terry, who played "Toto" in The Wizard of Oz (1939)

George William Weidler was the fifth of six children born to German parents. His father was architect Alfred Weidler (1886–1966), and his mother was opera singer Margarete Therese Louise (née Radon).

The first four siblings (Waldtraud, Verena, Werther, and Wolfgang) were born in Germany. The eldest sibling, Waldtraud (later known as Sylvia) and the youngest sibling, Virginia, were both child film actresses. One of George's three brothers, Warner (born Werner Alfred Weidler), was a composer.

George Weidler and brothers Walt and Wolfgang appear as a juvenile saxophone-playing trio in the 1936 Our Gang (The Little Rascals) short film The Pinch Singer.

=== Marriages ===
1. Weidler married Doris Day in 1946, becoming her second of four husbands; the marriage ended in divorce in 1949.
2. Weidler then married Donna Mae Boniface in Clark County, Washington, on November 16, 1950; the marriage ended in either annulment or divorce in Los Angeles in July 1951.
3. Weidler then married actress/singer Maureen Arthur (1934–2022) on December 5, 1957, in Las Vegas; the marriage ended in divorce in 1970.
4. Weidler then married Barbara C. Heussenstam (born 1923) on June 21, 1971, in Los Angeles; they remained married until his death in 1989 at the age of 63.
