= This Time for Keeps (1942 film) =

1942 film by Charles Reisner

- Directed by: Charles Reisner
- Written by: Herman J. Mankiewicz; Muriel Roy Bolton; Rian James; Harry Ruskin
- Produced by: Samuel Marx
- Starring: Ann Rutherford; Robert Sterling; Guy Kibbee
- Cinematography: Charles Lawton Jr.
- Edited by: Fredrick Y. Smith
- Music by: Lennie Hayton
- Production company: Metro-Goldwyn-Mayer
- Distributed by: Loew's Inc.
- Release date: March 1942
- Running time: 73 minutes
- Country: United States
- Language: English
- Budget: $252,000
- Box office: $327,000

This Time for Keeps is a 1942 American comedy film directed by Charles Reisner and starring Ann Rutherford, Robert Sterling, and Guy Kibbee. Produced by Metro-Goldwyn-Mayer, it followed on from the 1940 film Keeping Company.

This Time for Keeps (1947) starred Esther Williams.

== Plot ==
Lee White, left alone while his wife Kit is out of town, moves in with her parents just to have some company. Lee is persuaded by father-in-law Harry to quit is job as a car salesman and come into the real-estate business with him. His first assignment is to sell a piece of land to Arthur Freeman, a wealthy property investor.

Kit's little sister Harriet enters a contest in a movie theater hoping to win a cash prize, but instead wins 200 bars of the sponsor's soap. Kit, meantime, comes home to find her husband and father working together but quarreling over Harry's unwillingness to interfere with Lee's work.

An inspirational idea to scatter Harriet's soap on the property for sale, making Freeman fear a soap company's about to buy it, backfires when Harry talks the client out of it. A frustrated Lee is offered a job by Freeman and considers it, concerning his wife.

Lee joins the rest of the family at a costume ball, where both Harry and Freeman are dressed as clowns. He mixes them up and by accident gets Harry to understand his love for Kit and her loved ones. As they agree to work better together, Harriet wins first prize at the ball—another 100 bars of soap.

== Cast ==
- Ann Rutherford as Katherine 'Kit' White
- Robert Sterling as Lee White
- Guy Kibbee as Harry Bryant
- Irene Rich as Mrs. Bryant
- Virginia Weidler as Harriett Bryant
- Henry O'Neill as Arthur Freeman
- Dorothy Morris as Edith Bryant
- Richard Crane as Eustace Andrews
- Joe Strauch Jr. as Milton A. Jones
- Tim Ryan as Professor Diz
- Connie Gilchrist as Miss Nichols
- Lucien Littlefield as Herb
- Frances Carson as Mrs. Arthur Freeman
- Regina Wallace as Mrs. Lornow, Hostess
- Robert Emmett Keane as Burt Reiner
- Mark Daniels as Mr. Sawyer
- Hooper Atchley as Masquerade Party Judge
- Ken Christy as Train Conductor
- Frank Hagney as Electrical Lineman
- Ava Gardner as Girl in Car Lighting Cigarette

== Reception ==
The film made $207,000 in the US and Canada and $120,000 elsewhere during its initial release, making MGM a loss of $57,000.

== Bibliography ==
- Fetrow, Alan G. Feature Films, 1940-1949: a United States Filmography. McFarland, 1994.
