= Killers Three =

1968 film by Bruce Kessler

- Directed by: Bruce Kessler
- Written by: Dick Clark; Michael Fisher
- Produced by: Jack Bohrer; Dick Clark; Norman T. Herman
- Starring: Robert Walker; Diane Varsi; Dick Clark; Maureen Arthur
- Cinematography: J. Burgi Contner; Paul Hunt
- Edited by: Renn Reynolds
- Music by: Mike Curb; Harley Hatcher; Jerry Styner
- Production company: Dick Clark Productions
- Distributed by: American International Pictures
- Release date: November 1968
- Running time: 88 minutes
- Country: United States
- Language: English

Killers Three is an American crime drama film produced in 1968 by Dick Clark Productions and released by American International Pictures starring Robert Walker Jr., Diane Varsi and Dick Clark. Others in the cast include Norman Alden, Maureen Arthur, Merle Haggard and Bonnie Owens.

This western crime drama was written for the screen by Dick Clark and Michael Fisher. It was produced by Clark and directed by Bruce Kessler.

The soundtrack-album featured country singers Merle Haggard, Bonnie Owens, Kay Adams and Jack Clement. Haggard sings his own compositions including "Mama Tried".

== Plot ==
Johnny Warder gets out of prison and returns to North Carolina to marry sweetheart Carol, with whom he has a five-year-old son. Johnny and Carol decide to rob a local bootlegger's safe during a town picnic. Their accomplice is Roger, a former Army buddy of Johnny's with knowledge of explosives.

They blow the safe to get at the $250,000 inside, but the job goes awry. During their escape, Johnny and Roger kill a law-enforcement official.

At a diner, a state trooper, Carol's brother Charlie, spots the fugitives. In deference to his sister, Charlie agrees to give them a 10-minute head start before he contacts his fellow lawmen. But when emerging from a restroom, Roger doesn't realize who Charlie is and shoots him dead.

The police eventually surround the gang at a sawmill. During a shootout, Roger is killed. Johnny and Carol drive off in a hail of bullets, and Carol is also killed. Johnny drives her body back to her mother and son.

== Cast ==
- Robert Walker Jr. as Johnny Warder
- Diane Varsi as Carol
- Dick Clark as Roger
- Norman Alden as Guthrie
- Maureen Arthur as Elvira Sweeney
- Merle Haggard as Charlie
- Bonnie Owens as Singer

== Production ==
Much of the movie was filmed in Ramseur, North Carolina, with additional scenes shot in Coleridge.
