= Grissly's Millions =

1945 film by John English

- Theatrical release poster
- Directed by: John English
- Screenplay by: Muriel Roy Bolton
- Produced by: Walter H. Goetz
- Starring: Paul Kelly; Virginia Grey; Don Douglas; Elisabeth Risdon; Robert Barrat; Clem Bevans
- Cinematography: William Bradford
- Edited by: Harry Keller
- Music by: Joseph Dubin
- Production company: Republic Pictures
- Distributed by: Republic Pictures
- Release date: January 16, 1945
- Running time: 71 minutes
- Country: United States
- Language: English

Grissly's Millions is a 1945 American mystery film directed by John English and written by Muriel Roy Bolton. The film stars Paul Kelly, Virginia Grey, Don Douglas, Elisabeth Risdon, Robert Barrat and Clem Bevans. The film was released on January 16, 1945, by Republic Pictures.

== Cast ==
- Paul Kelly as Joe Simmons
- Virginia Grey as Katherine Palmor Bentley
- Don Douglas as Ellison Hayes
- Elisabeth Risdon as Leona Palmor
- Robert Barrat as Grissly Morgan Palmor
- Clem Bevans as Old Tom
- Eily Malyon as Mattie
- Adele Mara as Maribelle
- Francis Pierlot as Dr. Benny
- Addison Richards as Henry Adams
- Paul Fix as Lewis Bentley
- Byron Foulger as Fred Palmor
- Joan Blair as Mrs. Fred Palmor
- Grady Sutton as Robert Palmor Jr.
- Frank Jaquet as Robert Palmor Sr.
- Will Wright as John Frey
- Louis Mason as Gatekeeper
- Tom London as Policeman Ralph
