= Keeping Company =

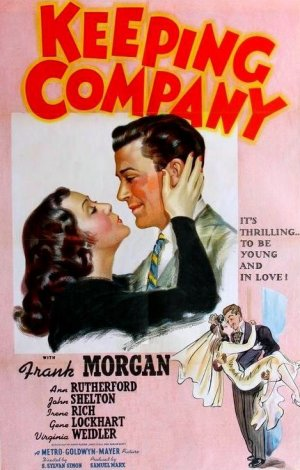
- Directed by: S. Sylvan Simon
- Screenplay by: Harry Ruskin; James H. Hill; Adrian Scott
- Story by: Herman J. Mankiewicz
- Produced by: Samuel Marx
- Starring: Frank Morgan; Ann Rutherford; Irene Rich
- Cinematography: Karl Freund
- Edited by: Elmo Veron
- Music by: Daniele Amfitheatrof
- Production company: Metro-Goldwyn-Mayer
- Distributed by: Loew's Inc.
- Release date: December 27, 1940
- Running time: 80 minutes
- Country: United States
- Language: English

Keeping Company is a 1940 American drama film directed by S. Sylvan Simon and starring Frank Morgan, Ann Rutherford and Irene Rich. Morgan plays a real estate broker with three daughters who all have their own problems. The film was produced by Metro-Goldwyn-Mayer and was followed by a sequel This Time for Keeps (1942).

== Plot summary ==
Harry C. Thomas and his wife Susan have a hard time keeping track of their three very different daughters: Evelyn, the eldest, ready for marriage; Mary, engaged to car dealer Ted Foster; and Harriet, an unpredictable adolescent trying to catch up to her sisters, and always on the hunt for ice cream.

Mary's engagement prompts Harry and Susan to give their daughter advice about married life. Mary and Ted are certain that marriage will be a walk in the park, but almost instantly Ted's old girlfriend, Anastasia Atherton, arrives from New York. She needs financial help and Ted gives her a car but doesn't tell Mary about the gift, which causes a misunderstanding when she finds in the car a check Ted wrote for Anastasia. Believing that Ted is having an affair, Mary goes home to her parents. Meanwhile, Ted manages to put the car shop's owner Mr. Hellman at risk, ordering 40 new cars that the intended customer refuses to buy. Humiliated, Ted goes into hiding and Mary must arrange and attend the company picnic alone. Hellman had planned to announce Ted as his successor at the picnic, but he doesn't; Mary scolds him and speaks highly of Ted's good points to bring Hellman to his senses.

Ted reappears and tells everyone that he has managed to save the Hellman company from ruin by selling the cars to another dealer. Hellman talks to Ted, revealing how his wife had stood up for him while he was away. Ted is then reconciled with Mary.

== Cast ==
- Frank Morgan as Harry C. Thomas
- Ann Rutherford as Mary Thomas
- Irene Rich as Mrs. Susan Thomas
- Virginia Weidler as Harriet Thomas
- Gloria DeHaven as Evelyn 'Skinny' Thomas
- John Shelton as Ted 'Teddy' Foster
- Gene Lockhart as Mr. Hellman
- Virginia Grey as Anastasia 'Stasia' Atherton
- Dan Dailey as Jim Reynolds
- Sara Haden as Mrs. Foster
- Richard Crane as Eddie Lane
- Fern Emmett as Mrs. Miller
- Harry Tyler as Joe Green, Ice Cream Man
- John Webb Dillion as Postman
- Buddy Messinger as Basketball Ticket Boy

== Bibliography ==
- Fetrow, Alan G. Feature Films, 1940-1949: a United States Filmography. McFarland, 1994.
- Schmitt, Gavin. Karl Freund: The Life and Films. McFarland, 2022.
