= Muriel Roy Bolton =

American film and TV writer

- Born: Muriel Roy; March 19, 1908; Chicago, Illinois, USA
- Died: March 4, 1983 (aged 74); Los Angeles, California, USA
- Resting place: Forest Lawn Memorial Park
- Occupations: Screenwriter; TV writer; playwright

Muriel Roy Bolton (March 19, 1908 – March 4, 1983) was an American film and television writer active in the 1940s through the 1960s.

== Biography ==
Born Muriel Roy in Chicago, Illinois, to Camille Roy and Amanda Anderson, she attended the University of Illinois at Urbana-Champaign before she moved to Hollywood.

In 1945, Bolton worked for Signet Films; she was paid $3000. Her credits include a number of Henry Aldrich films, in addition to dozens of episodes of CBS's The Millionaire. She also wrote a number of plays including Angels 'Round My Bed.

In 1947, she published a novel titled The Golden Porcupine, a historical romance set in 15th-century France. Bolton also published stories in magazines including Redbook and Cosmopolitan.

Her first marriage was to William Bolton; she later married educator Norman Mennes in 1957. She died of a heart attack in 1983 in her Los Feliz, Los Angeles, home.

== Selected filmography ==
- Mystery in Mexico (1948) (story)
- The Amazing Mr. X (1948)
- Mickey (1948)
- My Name Is Julia Ross (1945)
- Grissly's Millions (1945)
- Meet Miss Bobby Socks (1944)
- She's a Sweetheart (1944)
- Henry Plays Cupid (1944)
- You Can't Ration Love (1944) (story)
- Passport to Destiny (1944)
- Henry: Boy Scout (1944)
- Henry Haunts a House (1943)
- The Good Fellows (1943) (uncredited)
- Henry Swings It (1943)
- Henry Aldrich, Editor (1942)
- This Time for Keeps (1942)
