= Henry Goes Arizona =

1939 film by Edwin L. Marin

- Directed by: Edwin L. Marin
- Written by: Florence Ryerson; Milton Merlin
- Produced by: Harry Rapf
- Starring: Frank Morgan; Virginia Weidler
- Cinematography: Sidney Wagner; Lester White
- Edited by: Conrad A. Nervig
- Music by: David Snell
- Production company: Metro-Goldwyn-Mayer
- Release date: December 8, 1939
- Running time: 66 minutes
- Country: United States
- Language: English

Henry Goes Arizona is a 1939 American Western film starring Frank Morgan.

== Plot ==
Henry "Hank" Conroy is as an actor, who inherits his dead brother's ranch. While adjusting to the country there, he is threatened by a gang who is after the ranch. The film was directed by Edwin L. Marin.

== Cast ==
- Frank Morgan - Henry 'Hank' Conroy
- Virginia Weidler - Molly Cullison
- Guy Kibbee - Judge Van Treece
- Slim Summerville - Sheriff Parton
- Douglas Fowley - Ricky Dole
- Owen Davis Jr. - Danny Regan
