= Outside These Walls =

1939 film by Ray McCarey

- Directed by: Ray McCarey (as Raymond B. McCarey)
- Screenplay by: Harold Buchman
- Story by: Ferdinand Reyher
- Starring: Michael Whalen; Dolores Costello; Virginia Weidler
- Cinematography: Lucien Ballard
- Edited by: James Sweeney
- Music by: Morris Stoloff
- Production company: Columbia Pictures
- Distributed by: Columbia Pictures
- Release date: May 4, 1939
- Running time: 60 minutes
- Country: United States
- Language: English

Outside These Walls is a 1939 American crime film directed by Ray McCarey and starring Michael Whalen, Dolores Costello and Virginia Weidler.

== Plot ==
Dan Sparling is a convicted embezzler who becomes editor of his prison newspaper. After serving out his sentence, he sets up an independent newspaper devoted to attacking corruption in public life, encountering various difficulties due to his being an ex-con and opposition from the incumbent administration.

== Cast ==
- Michael Whalen as Dan Sparling
- Dolores Costello as Margaret Bronson
- Virginia Weidler as Ellen Sparling
- Don Beddoe as Dinky
- Selmer Jackson as John Wilson
- Mary Forbes as Gertrude Bishop
- Robert Emmett Keane as Sam Fulton
- Pierre Watkin as Hewitt Bronson
- Kathleen Lockhart as Miss Thronton
- Dick Curtis as Flint

== See also ==
- List of American films of 1939
