= Isaac M. Carpenter =

American musician

Ike Carpenter
- Born: Isaac Monroe Carpenter; March 11, 1920; Durham, North Carolina, US
- Died: November 17, 1998 (aged 78) Durham, North Carolina, US
- Genres: Jazz
- Occupations: Bandleader, pianist
- Instrument: Piano
- Years active: 1940s–1950s

Isaac Monroe Carpenter (March 11, 1920 – November 17, 1998) was an American jazz bandleader and pianist active in the 1940s and 1950s, most noted for his success in nightclubs on the West Coast during the post-World War II rise in popularity of American jazz music.

== Musical career ==
Carpenter began performing on piano with bands at a very young age, in the mid-1930s. After graduating from college, he performed with a number of successful musicians, including Johnnie Davis.

In 1944, he worked briefly as a pianist in bandleader Boyd Raeburn's first influential jazz group, then put together his first band, working gigs on the East coast. In 1947 he relocated to Hollywood, where he formed a popular 12-man band that played primarily in the Los Angeles area, with tours up the West coast as far as Canada.

In the 1950s, he left the band scene, and worked as an accompanist for performers in the Ice Capades. In the late 1950s, he briefly returned to bandleading with small groups, before retiring to his hometown in North Carolina.

He recorded for the Modern Records label, with much of his music arranged by noted jazz arranger and composer Paul Villepigue. He also recorded for the Aladdin Records and Decca Records labels. Notable musicians who played with him include Lucky Thompson, Gerald Wilson, Ted Nash, and George Weidler.

His band was featured in two Hollywood musical films in the 1950s, Rhythm and Rhyme and Holiday Rhythm.

== Personal ==
Isaac Monroe Carpenter was born on March 11, 1920, in Durham, North Carolina, the son of Thomas E. Carpenter and Lucy A. Howard. He attended Durham High School and Duke University. He never married.

Carpenter died in Durham on November 17, 1998, at age 78. He is buried in the Maplewood Cemetery in Durham.
