= Call of the Wild (1935 film) =

1935 film by William A. Wellman

- Theatrical release poster
- Directed by: William A. Wellman
- Screenplay by: Gene Fowler; Leonard Praskins
- Based on: The Call of the Wild by: Jack London
- Produced by: Darryl F. Zanuck
- Starring: Clark Gable; Loretta Young; Jack Oakie
- Cinematography: Charles Rosher
- Edited by: Hanson T. Fritch
- Music by: Alfred Newman
- Production company: 20th Century Pictures, Inc.
- Distributed by: United Artists Corp. 20th Century-Fox
- Release date: August 9, 1935
- Running time: 92 minutes
- Country: United States
- Language: English

Call of the Wild is a 1935 American adventure Western film an adaptation of Jack London's 1903 novel The Call of the Wild. The film is directed by William A. Wellman, and stars Clark Gable, Loretta Young and Jack Oakie. The screenplay is by Gene Fowler and Leonard Praskins. This is the last film to be released under the 20th Century Pictures banner before being merged with the Fox Film Corporation to create 20th Century-Fox.

== Plot ==
In Skagway in 1900, Jack Thornton announces to a crowded bar that he is going home after striking it rich in the gold fields, but then loses most of his money gambling. He then runs into old pal, "Shorty" Hoolihan, who has just been released from jail after serving a sentence for reading other people's mail. Shorty tells Jack that the contents of one letter he read is worth a million dollars. It contained a map to a rich gold strike; prospector Martin Blake died before he could stake his claim to it, but the letter was mailed to his son John. Shorty had to eat the map when he was apprehended, but reconstructed it as best he could from memory.

Jack's luck changes when he pays $250 for Buck, a savage St. Bernard dog, to keep him from being shot by an arrogant Englishman named Smith. Jack and Shorty head off for the Yukon with the map, Buck and other dogs. Along the way, they rescue Claire Blake from wolves. Her husband is Martin Blake's son and had the original map; he left to look for food and did not return. She refuses to leave without determining John's fate, but Jack drags her away. Sharing the hardships of the trail on their way to Dawson, her initial loathing of Jack gradually melts away.

Once they reach Dawson, Jack proposes she join forces with them, as she knows what parts of Shorty's map are wrong. She agrees. However, they still need a stake. Smith bets a thousand dollars against Buck that the dog cannot pull a heavily loaded sled weighing a thousand pounds a hundred yards. Buck manages the feat, enabling them to buy what they need.

After the trio set out in search of Martin Blake's find, a barely alive John Blake is found and brought in. He talks Smith into backing him and joining him on the trail to the site, but does not trust the Englishman and his two henchmen.

The three reach their destination and find it to be all they had hoped. Shorty leaves to file a claim. Jack and Claire wait and eventually acknowledge their love for each other. Buck, in the meantime, feels a strong urge to join a pack of wolves; he frequently leaves to spend time with a female wolf.

When Blake and Smith reach the site, Smith has Blake strangled, then holds Jack and Claire at gunpoint. The intruders take the gold they have already gathered and destroy anything that would enable the couple to leave. The villains then leave in their canoe, but it overturns and they drown, weighed down by the stolen gold, within sight of Jack and Claire.

Buck finds John Blake, still alive, though in bad shape. They nurse him back to health. Jack wants to keep Claire anyway, but she will not go along. Jack then recommends that John leave to get proper medical attention before the weather makes it impossible. John and Claire leave.

Jack acknowledges Buck's desire to answer the "call of the wild", and releases him into the wilderness. Buck is shown with his new family of half-dog, half-wolf pups, playing in the woods.

Jack is soon joined by Shorty, who arrives with news of their claim and a new cook, whom he won in a crap game.

== Cast ==
- Clark Gable as Jack Thornton
- Loretta Young as Claire Blake
- Jack Oakie as "Shorty" Hoolihan
- Reginald Owen as Mr. Smith
- Frank Conroy as John Blake
- Katherine DeMille as Marie
- Sidney Toler as Joe Groggins
- James Burke as Ole
- Charles Stevens as Francois
- Lalo Encinas as Kali
- Thomas E. Jackson as "Tex" Rickard
- Russ Powell as Bartender
- Herman Bing as Sam
- George McQuarrie as Mounted Policeman
- Buck as himself

== Production ==
In an article written for TCM in 2012, John M. Miller noted that the film benefits from "..a real chemistry between the two leads. That chemistry resulted in one of the best-kept secrets in Hollywood history; had it not been well kept at the time, two famous careers could have been essentially destroyed." Gable and Young had flirted heavily on-set, but did not act on a possible infatuation. Gable was married, and Young had ended an affair with married actor Spencer Tracy. On the train ride back to Hollywood from on-location shooting, Gable visited Young in her sleeping compartment. The two had sexual relations, which Young later categorized as "date rape". Young became pregnant and kept it a secret to avoid having an abortion ordered by the studio. She gave birth to Mary Judith Clark, (aka Judy Lewis) on November 6, 1935 and had the child transferred to an orphanage. More than a year and a half later, she was 'adopted' by Young. Her mother told Judy who her father was in 1966, after Gable had died. During his lifetime, Gable only met Judy once, in 1950 at Young's house. Young kept Gable's parentage a secret all of her life, only acknowledging it in a post-humous biography. Lewis revealed who her biological father was in a biography published in 1994.

Buck the St. Bernard was owned and trained by Hollywood dog trainer Carl Spitz.

=== Release ===
This was the last film released under the Twentieth Century Pictures' banner before it merged with Fox Film Corporation to create 20th Century-Fox Film Corporation.

== Filming locations ==
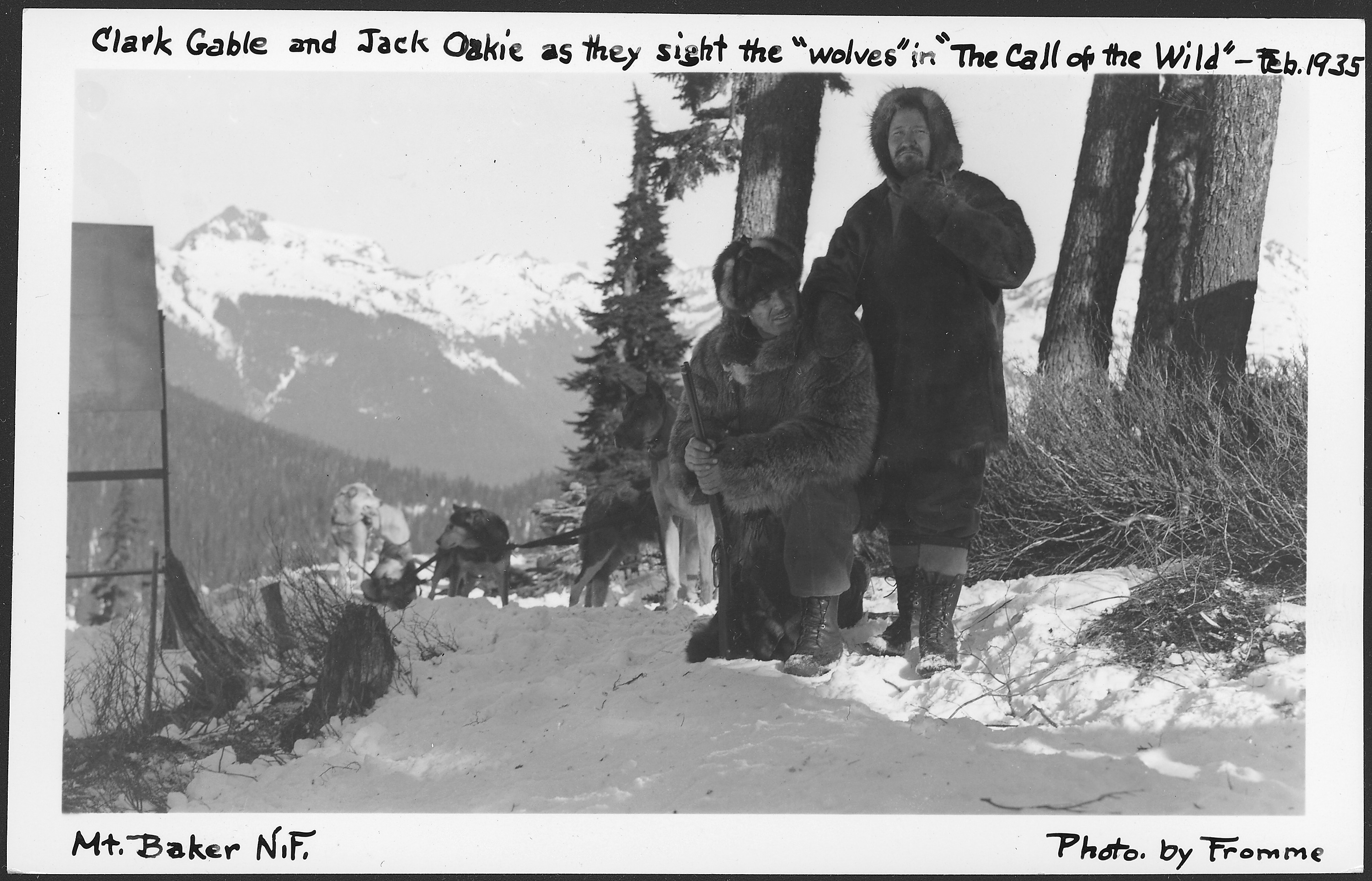
Mount Baker National Forest

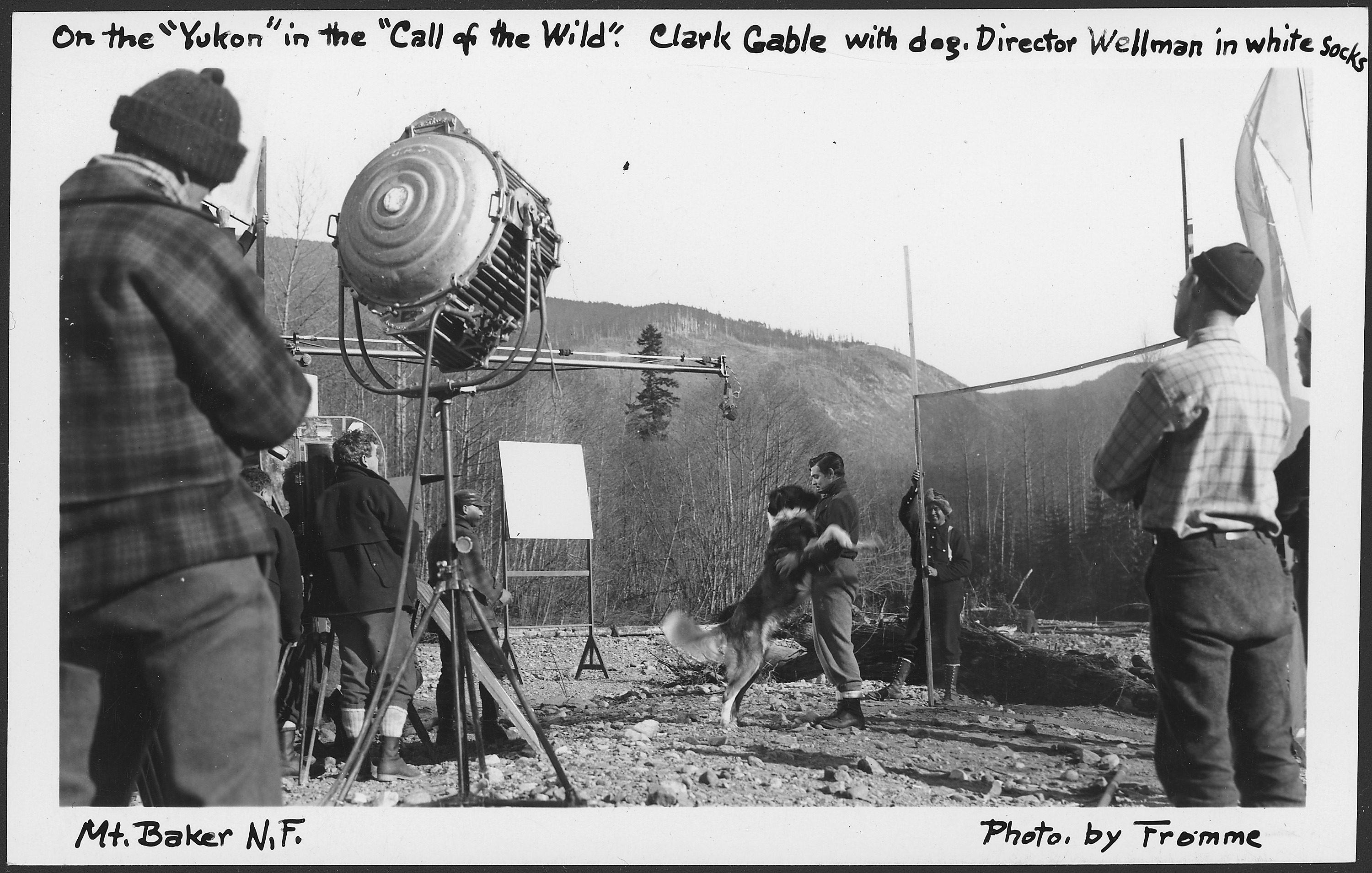
Mount Baker National Forest

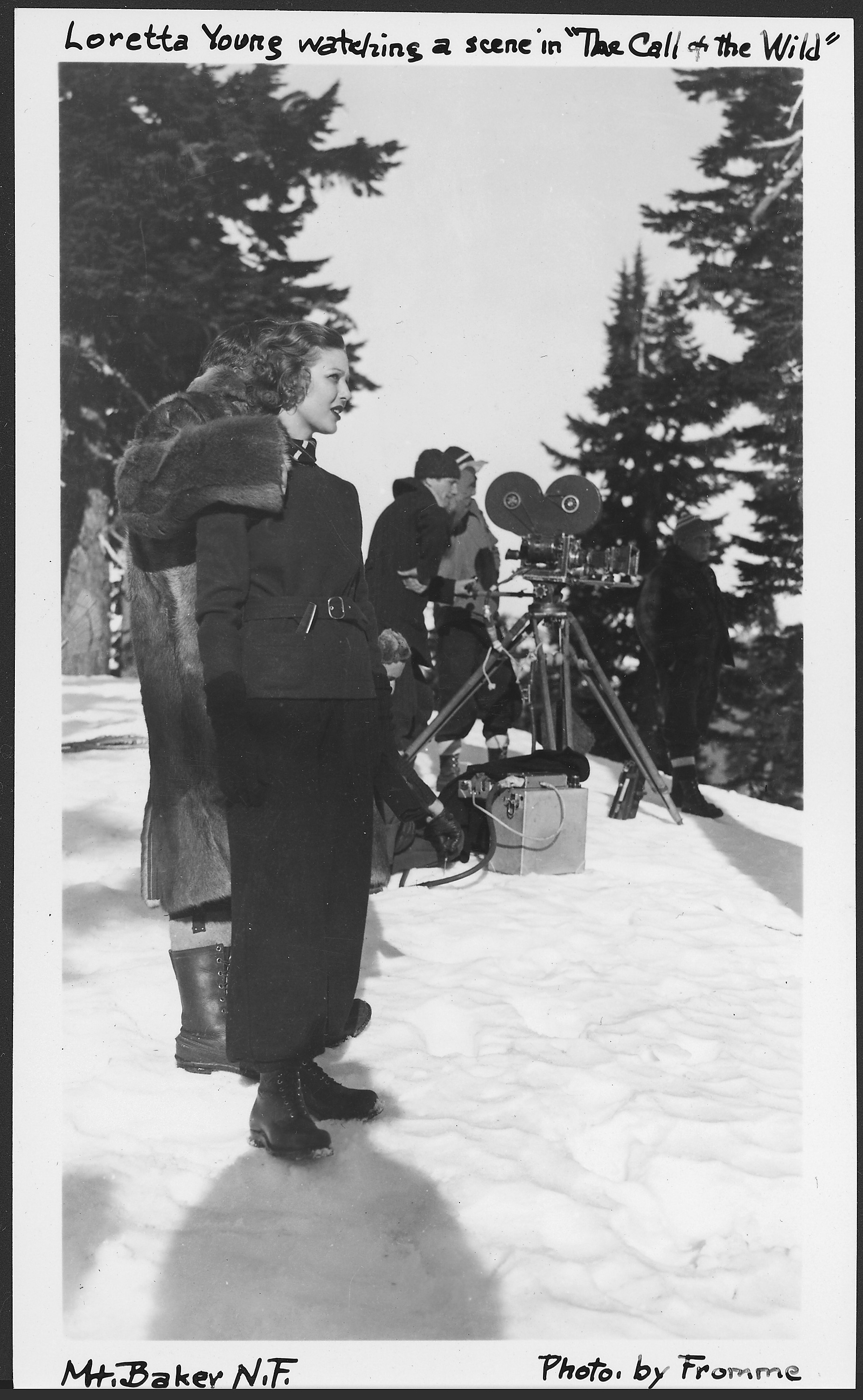
Mount Baker National Forest

== Reissues ==
The film was reissued in 1945 and 1953 in a truncated 81-minute version to fit on double bills; this shorter cut became the standard edition for TV and DVD release. The original print was restored on the 2013 Blu-ray release.
