= Bad Little Angel =

1939 film by Wilhelm Thiele

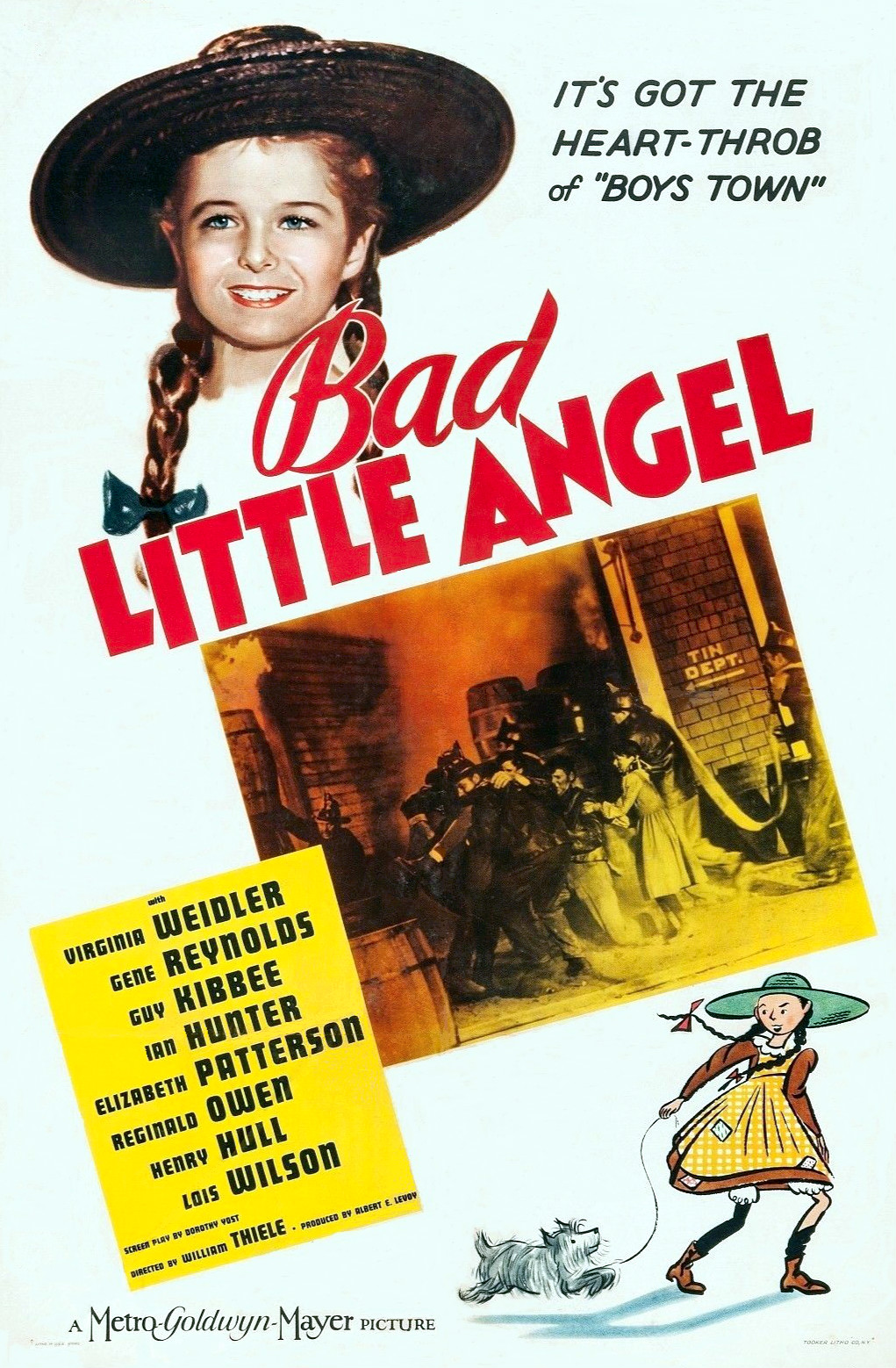
- Film poster
- Directed by: Wilhelm Thiele
- Written by: Dorothy Yost
- Based on: "Looking After Sandy" by Margaret Turnbull
- Produced by: Albert E. Levoy
- Starring: Virginia Weidler; Gene Reynolds
- Cinematography: John F. Seitz
- Edited by: Frank Sullivan
- Music by: Edward Ward
- Production company: Metro-Goldwyn-Mayer
- Distributed by: Metro-Goldwyn-Mayer
- Release date: October 27, 1939
- Running time: 72 minutes
- Country: United States
- Language: English

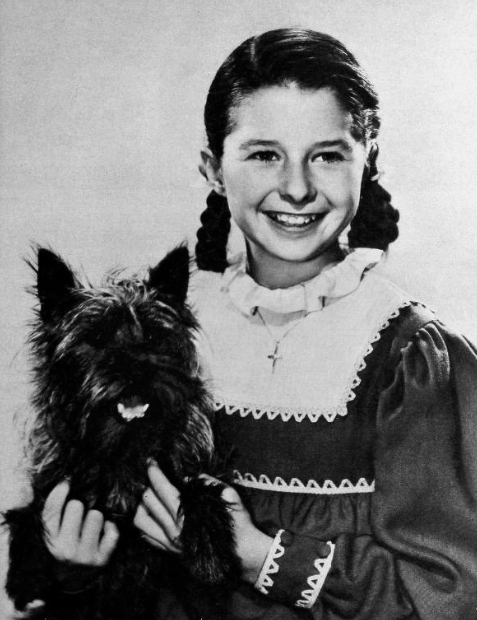
Virginia Weidler and Terry, who also played "Toto" in The Wizard of Oz that year (1939)

Bad Little Angel is a 1939 inspirational drama film starring Virginia Weidler as an orphan named Patsy Sanderson, living in America around 1900. The film was based on the story "Looking After Sandy" by Margaret Turnbull.

== Plot ==
Treated with contempt in her small New England town, the lonely Patsy takes the advice of a dying woman and decides to live according to verses in the Bible. After reading a verse about Egypt, she flees her orphanage and spends almost all the money she has on a train ticket to a town called Egypt, New Jersey. There she finds friends and a new family, helps the downtrodden, and awakens the consciences of wrongdoers.

== Cast ==
- Virginia Weidler as Patricia Victoria 'Patsy' Sanderson
- Gene Reynolds as Thomas 'Tommy' Wilks
- Guy Kibbee as Luther Marvin
- Ian Hunter as Jim Creighton
- Elizabeth Patterson as Mrs. Perkins
- Reginald Owen as Edwards, Marvin's Valet
- Henry Hull as Red Wilks
- Lois Wilson as Mrs. Ellen Creighton
- Byron Foulger as New Sentinel Editor (uncredited)
- Russell Hicks as Maj. Ellwood (uncredited)
- George Irving as Dr. Bell (uncredited)
- Mitchell Lewis as Fireman (uncredited)
- Terry as Rex the Dog (uncredited)
