= Maureen Arthur =

American film, TV, and stage actress (1934–2022)

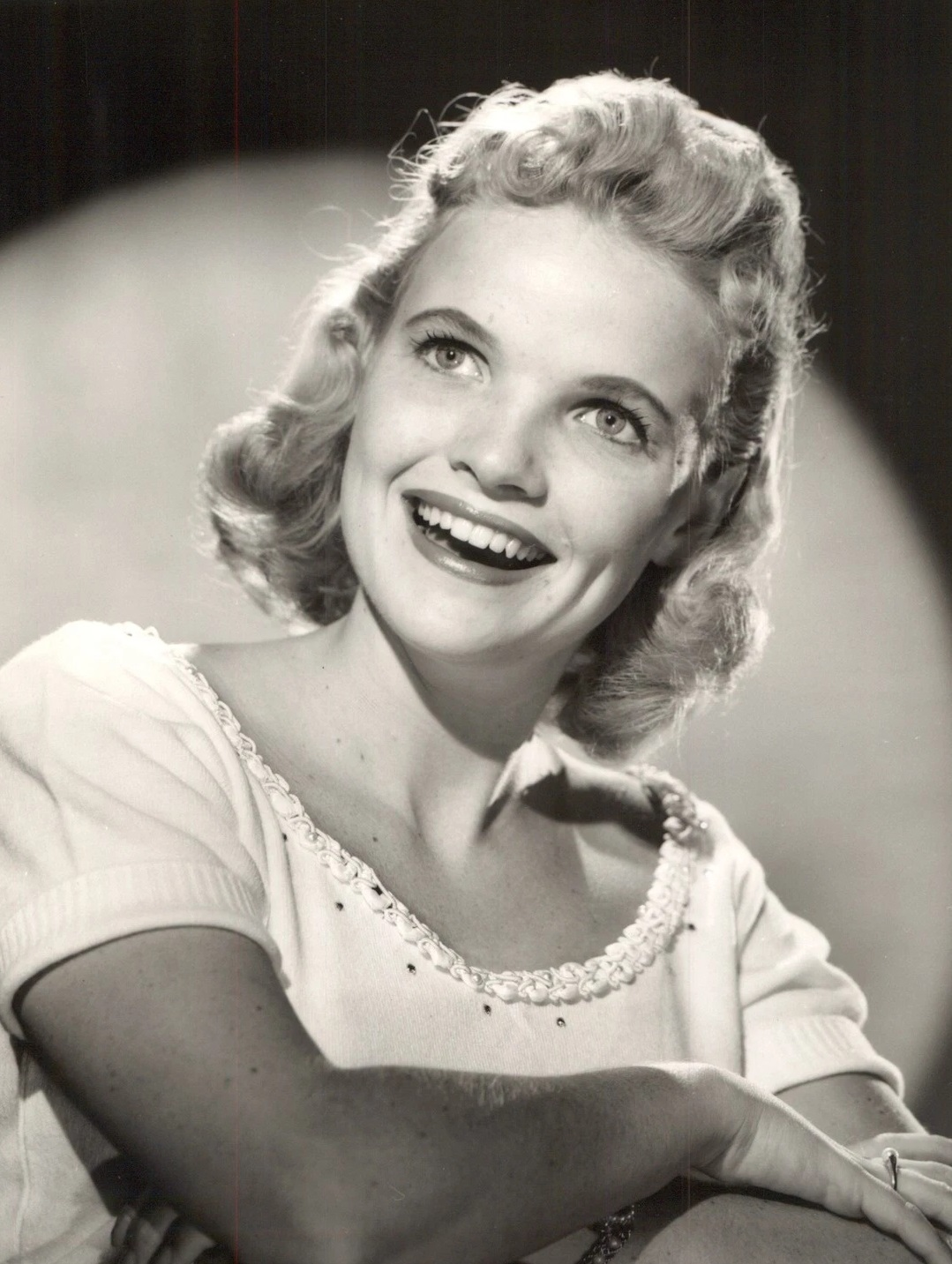
- Arthur in 1956
- Born: Maureen Louise Arthur; April 15, 1934; San Jose, California, U.S.
- Died: June 15, 2022 (aged 88); Beverly Hills, California, U.S.
- Occupations: Actress, singer
- Years active: 1957–2022
- Spouses: George William Weidler (m. 1957; div. 1970); Aaron Ruben (m. 1971; died 2010)

Maureen Louise Arthur (April 15, 1934 – June 15, 2022) was an American film, television, and stage actress.

== Life and career ==
Arthur appeared in numerous movies and television programs from the late 1950s through the early 1990s as well as on Broadway. On television, she appeared in Bourbon Street Beat; The Red Skelton Hour; Perry Mason; Branded; I Spy; Get Smart; The Monkees; The Flying Nun; Gomer Pyle, U.S.M.C.; Love, American Style; The New Dick Van Dyke Show; Night Gallery; Kolchak: The Night Stalker; Sanford and Son; Laverne & Shirley; Alice; Mork & Mindy; Murder, She Wrote; The Red Hand Gang as child-kidnapper Lola; and Matlock.

In 1967, in arguably her most prominent single movie role, she portrayed Hedy La Rue in the film version of the Broadway hit How to Succeed in Business Without Really Trying. In 1969, she co-starred with Don Knotts in the comedy The Love God?, and with Bob Hope, Jackie Gleason and Jane Wyman in the romantic comedy How to Commit Marriage.

In the mid-1960s, she recorded a pop tune on the Carlton record label titled "Don't Make the Angels Cry" and "What Does He Do with Her". Another single titled "Don't Leave Me" was unreleased, though an acetate recording exists. In New York, she studied singing and also studied drama with Wynn Handman of the Neighborhood Playhouse. She made frequent appearances on The Steve Allen Show and on The Ed Sullivan Show before moving on to play the Rivera Hotel in Las Vegas with the Latin Quarter Review. She traveled to Los Angeles to star in movies, beginning with Hot Rod Gang, Thunder Alley and Killers Three.

While in Los Angeles, she auditioned for the national cast of How to Succeed in Business Without Really Trying and landed the part of Hedy La Rue. She toured across the U.S. for two years and was in the Broadway production for one year before returning to Los Angeles for another audition, this time for the movie. After several more movies, she headed back to Broadway for Something Different, a play written and directed by Carl Reiner, and starring Bob Dishy and Linda Lavin. When that play closed, she returned to Los Angeles to marry producer/creator Aaron Ruben. Her performance as Miss Adelaide in the Los Angeles Civic Light Opera revival of Guys and Dolls brought her a Drama Critics' Best Performance Award.

In a 2007 book, Glamour Girls of Sixties Hollywood, author Tom Lisanti wrote that in the late 1960s, this “light leading lady with the kewpie doll voice was the popular choice to play kooky gold diggers and dumb bimbos.”

== Personal life and death ==
Arthur was married to musician George William Weidler from 1957 to 1970 when they divorced. She then was married to producer Aaron Ruben from October 30, 1971 until his death on January 30, 2010. Arthur died on June 15, 2022, in her home in Beverly Hills, California, at the age of 88 from natural causes after a long battle with Alzheimer's disease.

== Affiliations ==
Arthur performed at the Variety of Iowa Telethons yearly for over 25 years and was a member of the Iowa Chapter of Variety. Her longtime association with Variety earned her the title of "First Lady of Variety Clubs Telethons", and then she earned the official title of International Ambassador. She was a longtime president of Variety, the Children's Charity of Southern California, Tent 25.

== Filmography ==
Year	Title	Role	Notes
1958	Hot Rod Gang	Marley	
1967	How to Succeed in Business Without Really Trying	Hedy LaRue	
1967	Thunder Alley	Babe	
1968	A Man Called Dagger	Joy	Also sang the title song
1968	The Wicked Dreams of Paula Schultz		
1968	Killers Three	Elvira Sweeney	
1969	How to Commit Marriage	Lois Grey	
1969	The Love God?	Evelyn Tremaine	
1971	The Love Machine	Ethel Evans	
1976	Harry and Walter Go to New York	Mrs. Hawthorne	

== Television ==
Year	Title	Role	Notes
1965	Branded		Season 2 Episode 3: "Mightier Than The Sword"
1966	Get Smart	The Contessa	Season 2 Episode 8: "Hoo Done It"
1967	The Monkees	Ruby	S1:E25, "Alias Micky Dolenz"
1971	Night Gallery	Angela Casey	Segment "The Dear Departed"
1973	Sanford and Son	Marilyn O'Neill	Season 3 Episode 2: "Lamont as Othello"
1991	Empty Nest	Nun	Season 4 Episode 12: "My Nurse Is Back and There's Gonna Be Trouble..."
