= Toto (Oz) =

Fictional dog in the Oz series

- Oz character
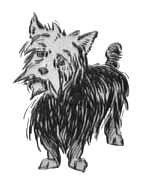
- Illustration by W. W. Denslow
- First appearance: The Wonderful Wizard of Oz (1900)
- Created by: L. Frank Baum; W. W. Denslow
- Portrayed by: Terry (The Wizard of Oz)
- Voiced by: Chris Cox (Lost in Oz)

In-universe information
- Species: Dog
- Gender: Male

Toto is a fictional dog in L. Frank Baum's Oz series of children's books, and works derived from them. He was originally a small terrier drawn by W. W. Denslow for the first edition of The Wonderful Wizard of Oz (1900). He reappears in later Oz books and in numerous adaptations, such as The Wizard of Oz (1939) and The Wiz (1978).

== In literature ==
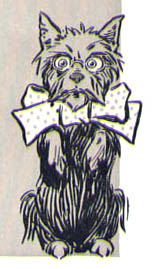
Illustration by W. W. Denslow

=== Classic Oz books ===
Toto belongs to Dorothy Gale, the heroine of the first and many subsequent books. In the first book, he never spoke, although other animals, native to Oz, did. In subsequent books, other animals gained the ability to speak upon reaching Oz or similar lands, but he remained speechless. In Tik-Tok of Oz, continuity is restored: he reveals that he is able to talk, just like other animals in the Land of Oz, and simply chooses not to. In The Lost Princess of Oz, he often talks continuously. Other major appearances include The Road to Oz, The Emerald City of Oz, Grampa in Oz and The Magical Mimics in Oz, in which he is the first to recognize the Mimics.

In The Wonderful Wizard of Oz, Baum did not specifically state Toto's breed, but wrote "he was a little black dog with long silky hair and small black eyes that twinkled merrily on either side of his funny, wee nose." However, from the illustrations in the first book many have concluded that he is a Cairn Terrier while others believe he is a Yorkshire Terrier as this breed was very popular at the time and it fits the illustration quite well. In subsequent books he becomes a Boston Terrier for reasons that are never explained, but then resumes the earlier look in later books.

Toto plays a central role in several critical points: he runs away at the beginning and end of the book and Dorothy changes plans to catch him; he pulls away the curtain to reveal the Wizard is a fake. Scholar Keri Weil analyzes the role:

Toto is the driving force behind Frank Baum’s narrative because it is Dorothy’s love for the dog that leads her to run away and escape the dreary moral landscape of Kansas and its arbiter, Miss Gulch. “It was Toto who made Dorothy laugh and saved her from growing as grey as her surroundings,” wrote Baum in the original version of the story.

=== Derivative works ===
In Gregory Maguire's 1995 novel Wicked: The Life and Times of the Wicked Witch of the West, Toto is a minor character who is only described as being vile and annoying. In the novel's musical theatre adaptation, he is only mentioned briefly when Glinda mistakenly calls him "Dodo".

Michael Morpurgo published Toto: The Wizard of Oz as told by the dog in 2020.

== In other media ==
=== The Wizard of Oz (1939) ===
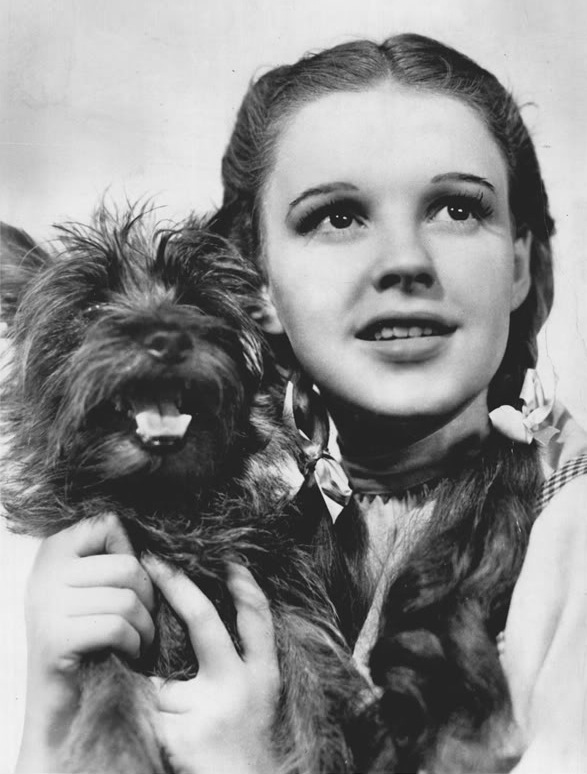
Terry as Toto with Judy Garland in The Wizard of Oz (1939)

In the 1939 movie The Wizard of Oz, Toto was played by a female brindle Cairn Terrier named Terry. She was paid a $125 salary each week, which was more than some of the human actors (the Singer Midgets who played the Munchkins reportedly received $50 to $100 a week).

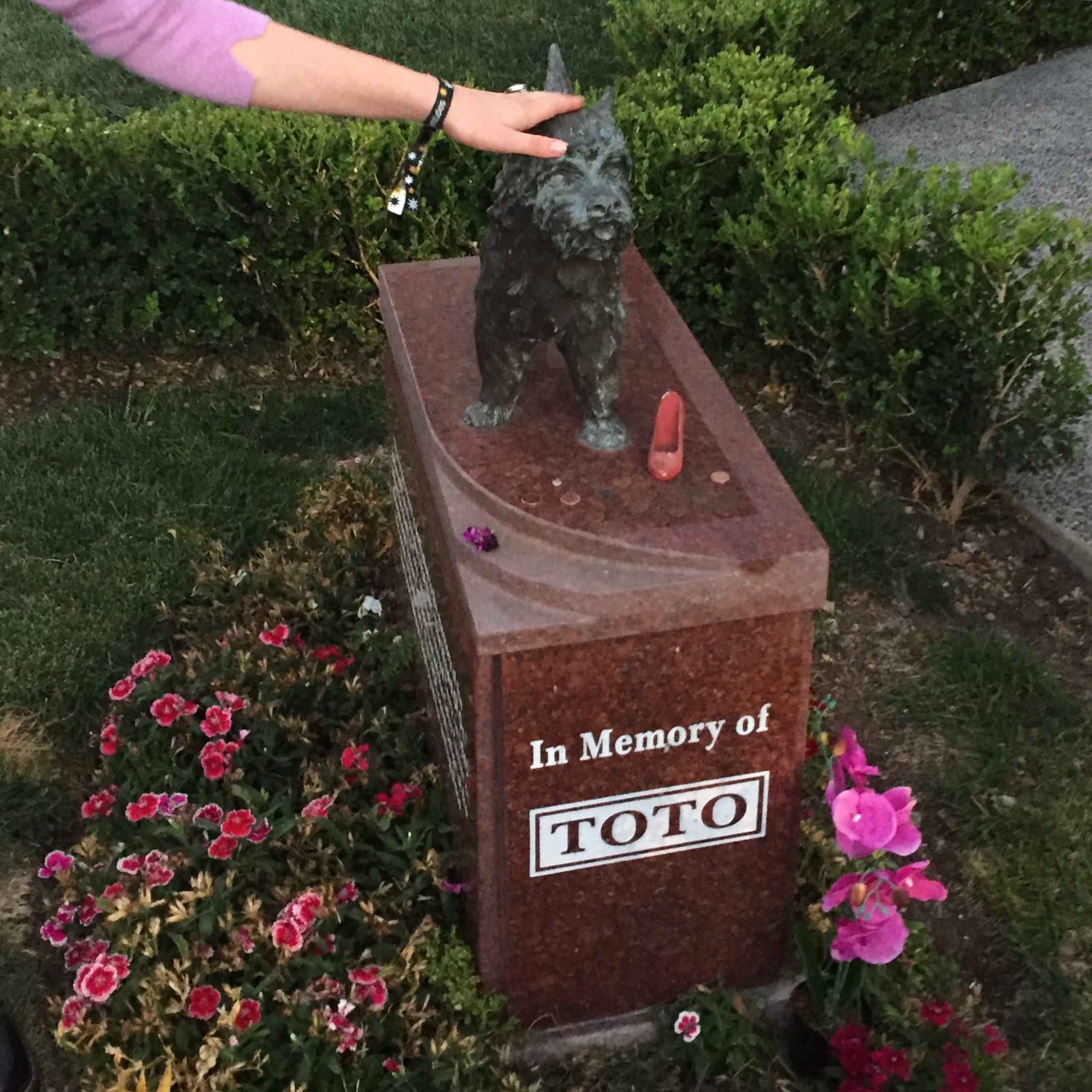
Terry/Toto's memorial at the Hollywood Forever Cemetery

During production, Terry's foot was broken when one of the Winkie guards accidentally stepped on it. A second dog had to be used while she healed. Due to the popularity of the movie, and because that role was the one she was most remembered for, her owner and trainer changed her official name to Toto. She actually appeared in 13 films. She died at age 11. Willard Carroll wrote her "autobiography," I, Toto (2001).

When Terry died in 1945, Carl Spitz buried her on his ranch in Studio City, California. However, the construction of the Ventura Freeway in 1958 destroyed her grave. On June 18, 2011, a permanent memorial for her was dedicated at the Hollywood Forever Cemetery in Los Angeles.

=== Other interpretations ===
- In Disney's 1985 film Return to Oz, Toto was played by a female Border Terrier named Tansy.
- The 1978 film adaptation of The Wiz featured a dark gray Schnauzer as Toto.
- Toto appears in The Wizard of Oz cartoon with his vocal effects provided by Frank Welker.
- In ABC's telefilm The Muppets' Wizard of Oz, he is played by Pepe the King Prawn.
- In the 1996 animated series The Oz Kids, Dot and Neddie have a puppy named Toto 2 who is named after him. One of the episodes says it is a female.
- In the VeggieTales episode "The Wonderful Wizard of Has", he is replaced by a pig named "Tutu".
- In the Sci-Fi Channel miniseries Tin Man, he is portrayed as a shape-shifting human. He was originally the tutor of DG and her sister, and his name of "Toto" came from DG's childhood inability to say "Tutor". He was played by Blu Mankuma.
- Toto also appears in the film Inkheart. In it, Silvertongues have the ability to bring a character from book to life by saying the words loud and clear. Meggy accidentally brings Toto out of the book The Wonderful Wizard of Oz and he becomes her companion (until he's sent back into it at the end). He helps defeat the evil shadow monster as well.
- In the Disney Channel Original Movie The Cheetah Girls the main character has a dog named Toto. This name is given to him most likely because one of the characters is named Dorothea (Dorothy). However, this dog is a Bichon Frise instead of a black Cairn Terrier.
- Toto appeared in Dorothy and the Witches of Oz. He lived with Dorothy even when she was invited to New York City to get her books published.
- Toto appeared in Legends of Oz: Dorothy's Return.
- Toto is a German Shepherd in NBC's television series Emerald City. Initially a police dog that was in the police car Dorothy retreated to during the initial tornado that sent her to Oz, he is subsequently "adopted" by her in her journey through Oz. His name in Kansas is unknown, but he is named by Dorothy after the Munja'kin word for "dog".
- Toto appears in the 2015 animated series Lost in Oz, voiced by Chris Cox.
- Toto appears in the 2017 animated series Dorothy and the Wizard of Oz.
- Toto appears in The Lego Movie 2: The Second Part. Alongside Dorothy and her friends, Toto found himself somehow transported from the Land of Oz to Harmony Town in the Systar System.
- On July 12, 2018, it was announced that Warner Animation Group would produce an animated film adaptation of the children's book Toto: The Dog-Gone Amazing Story of the Wizard of Oz. The film was originally scheduled to be theatrically released on February 2, 2024 in the United States. On April 5, 2023, it was taken off the release schedule with The Alto Knights taking over its original release date, which also moved off that date by October 2023.
- Although not a direct adaptation to the literature itself, the 2013 Super Sentai series, Zyuden Sentai Kyoryuger features the Deboth Army's members being themed after the characters in The Wonderful Wizard of Oz. Ferocious Knight D is designed with the motif of Toto.
- In the Alphablocks special The Wizard of Az, O has the role of Toto as “O-O”.
- Toto appears in the two-part film adaptation of the Wicked musical, making a brief cameo early in the first film and having a bigger role in the sequel, Wicked: For Good.

== Influence ==
The inspiration for the name Toto is the small town of Toto, Indiana, near the Baum family cottage at Bass Lake.

Toto has been widely recognized as one of the most famous of all dogs in movies and television. For example Time magazine in 2015 includes Toto in "The Most Famous Dogs in Movies and Television". Also in England, Neil Oliver. writes in The Sunday Times that 2020 has been. ”A tornado of anxieties...Like Toto, the little dog in The Wizard of Oz, we find ourselves far from home. I've a feeling we're not in Kansas any more. Also like Toto, no one understands our small voices. In this incomprehensible new place, we are to be silent while others speak." The last point emphasizes how important it is to be a quiet observer.

Members of the American rock band Toto have said the band was named after the dog. Though it was perhaps the original source for the name appearing on their demo tapes, they chose their name based upon the meaning of the Latin word toto ("all-encompassing").

TOTO is a backronym for 'TOtable Tornado Observatory', adapted from the name of Dorothy's dog from The Wizard of Oz. It is an in situ instrument for recording data from tornadoes.

== See also ==
- Oz Park, Chicago, US
- List of fictional dogs
