= Virginia Weidler =

American actress (1927–1968)

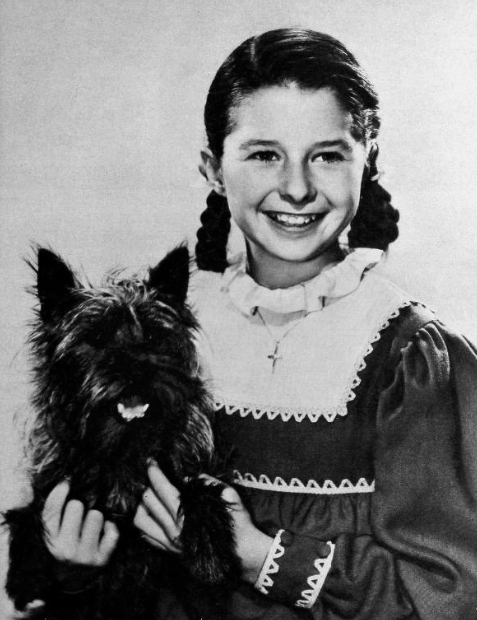
- Weidler holding Terry the dog for the film Bad Little Angel (1939)
- Born: Virginia Anna Adeleid Weidler; March 21, 1927; Los Angeles, California, U.S.
- Died: July 1, 1968 (aged 41); Los Angeles, California, U.S.
- Occupation: Actress
- Years active: 1931–1943
- Spouse: Lionel Krisel (m. 1947)
- Children: 2
- Relatives: George William Weidler (brother)

Virginia Anna Adeleid Weidler (March 21, 1927 – July 1, 1968) was an American child actress, popular in Hollywood films during the 1930s and 1940s.

== Early life and career ==
Weidler was born on March 21, 1927, in the Eagle Rock area of Los Angeles, California, the youngest of six children born to German parents, Alfred Weidler, an architect, and Margaret Weidler (born Margarete Therese Louise Radon, 1890–1987), a former opera singer. She was the second Weidler child born in the United States after the family emigrated from Germany in 1923.

She made her first film appearance in 1931. Her first credited role was as Europena in Mrs. Wiggs of the Cabbage Patch (1934), a role she won at age seven after having been seen in the play Autumn Crocus. Virginia made a big impression on audiences as the little girl who would "hold my breath 'til I am black in the face" to get her way.

For the next several years she appeared in many memorable films from George Stevens's Laddie (1935) to a pivotal supporting role in Souls at Sea (1937), starring Gary Cooper and George Raft. Despite being under contract to Paramount many of her roles were in films for RKO-Radio Pictures as a loan-out.

When Paramount did not extend her contract, she was signed by Metro-Goldwyn-Mayer in 1938. Her first film for MGM was with its leading male star Mickey Rooney in Love Is a Headache (1938). The film was a success and Weidler was later cast in larger roles. She was one of the all-female cast for the 1939 film The Women as the daughter of Norma Shearer's character.

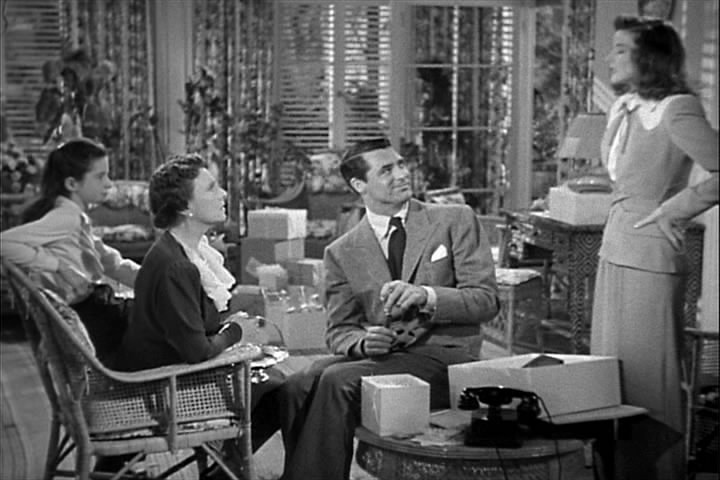
Weidler (far left) with Mary Nash, Cary Grant, and Katharine Hepburn in The Philadelphia Story (1940)

Her next major success was The Philadelphia Story (1940) in which she played Dinah Lord, the witty younger sister of Tracy Lord (Katharine Hepburn), and performed the song "Lydia the Tattooed Lady". Her film career ended with 1943's Best Foot Forward.

By her retirement from the screen at age 16, she had appeared in more than 40 films and had acted with some of the biggest stars of the day, including Clark Gable and Myrna Loy in Too Hot to Handle, Bette Davis in All This and Heaven Too, and Judy Garland in Babes on Broadway.

== Family ==
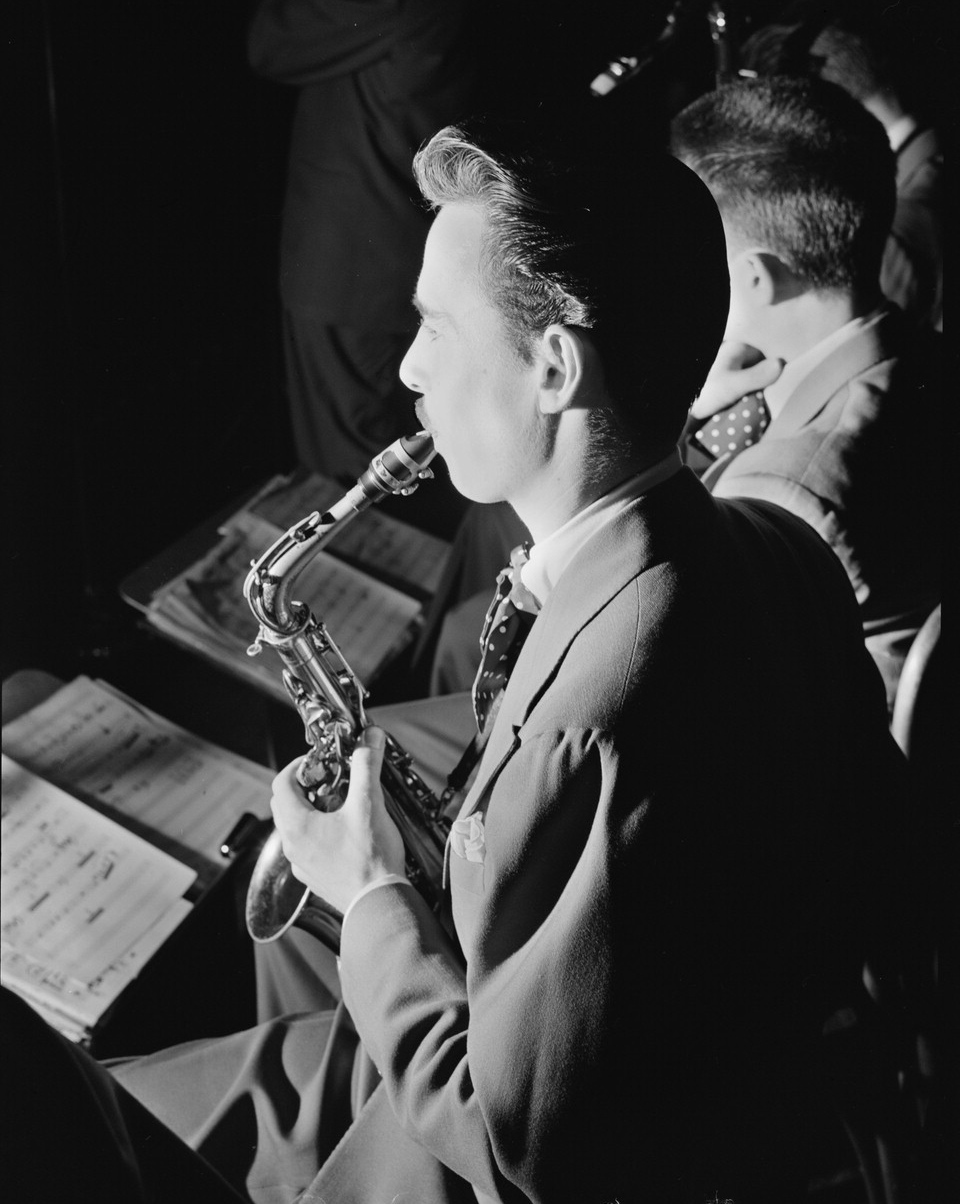
Brother George William Weidler

Virginia had three brothers and two sisters. Her brothers Warner (born Werner), Walter (born Wolfgang), and George were successful musicians after some child-acting work, eventually owning their own recording studio. George was married to singer-actress Doris Day from 1946–1949 (his first marriage, her second). Her sisters, Sylvia (born Waltraud) and Renee (born Verena), also were involved in show business prior to their marriages.

Her father turned his architectural skills into a career building miniature sets for 20th Century Fox.

== Marriage ==
On March 27, 1947, aged 20, Weidler married Lionel Krisel. They had two sons. Krisel's U.S. Navy career began during WWII; he spent two years in Korea in the early 1950s, and—with his wife and children—was stationed for some time in Cuba in the late 1950s.

== Death ==
After her retirement, Weidler gave no interviews for the remainder of her life. She was married to Krisel until her death at age 41 at her Los Angeles home on July 1, 1968. She had suffered from a heart ailment for many years and died of a heart attack.

== Legacy ==
In 2012, the Virginia Weidler Remembrance Society was created to honor her life and career.

In late 2016, the Los Angeles City Council honored Weidler by proclaiming March 21, 2017, which would have been her 90th birthday, as A Celebration of Virginia Weidler.

== Partial filmography ==
Year	Film	Role	Director	Notes
1931	Surrender	Little Girl	William K. Howard; Robert Lee "Lefty" Hough (assistant director)	uncredited
1933	After Tonight	Olga, Carla's Niece	George Archainbaud	uncredited
1934	Long Lost Father	Girl at Pier	Ernest B. Schoedsack	uncredited
1934	Stamboul Quest	Child	Sam Wood	
1934	Mrs. Wiggs of the Cabbage Patch	Europena Wiggs	Norman Taurog	
1934	Kid Millions	Little Girl		
1935	Laddie	'Little Sister' Stanton	George Stevens	
1935	The Big Broadcast of 1936	Little Girl in Hospital	Norman Taurog	
1935	Freckles	Laurie Lou Duncan	Edward Killy; William Hamilton; Charles Kerr (assistant)	
1935	Babes in Hollywood	Virginia	Robert F. McGowan	Short
1935	Peter Ibbetson	Mimsey - Mary Age 6	Henry Hathaway	
1936	Timothy's Quest	Samantha Tarbox	Charles Barton	
1936	Trouble for Two	Miss Vandeleur as a Child	J. Walter Ruben	scenes deleted
1936	Girl of the Ozarks	Edie Moseley	William Shea	
1936	The Big Broadcast of 1937	Flower Girl	Mitchell Leisen	
1937	Maid of Salem	Nabby - Their Daughter	Frank Lloyd	
1937	The Outcasts of Poker Flat	'Luck'	Christy Cabanne	
1937	Souls at Sea	Tina	Henry Hathaway	
1938	Love Is a Headache	Jake O'Toole	Richard Thorpe	
1938	Scandal Street	Wilma 'Willie' Murphy	James P. Hogan	
1938	Men with Wings	Peggy Ranson at Age 8	William A. Wellman	
1938	Mother Carey's Chickens	Lally Joy Popham	Rowland V. Lee	
1938	Too Hot to Handle	Hulda Harding	Jack Conway	
1938	Out West with the Hardys	'Jake' Harding	George B. Seitz	
1939	The Great Man Votes	Joan	Garson Kanin	
1939	The Lone Wolf Spy Hunt	Patricia	Peter Godfrey	
1939	Fixer Dugan	Ethel Myrtle 'Terry' O'Connell	Lew Landers; James Anderson (assistant)	
1939	The Rookie Cop	Nicey	David Howard	
1939	Outside These Walls	Ellen Sparling	Ray McCarey (as Raymond B. McCarey)	
1939	The Spellbinder	Girl	Jack Hively	uncredited
1939	The Under-Pup	Janet Cooper	Richard Wallace	
1939	The Women	Little Mary	George Cukor	
1939	Bad Little Angel	Patricia Victoria 'Patsy' Sanderson	Wilhelm Thiele	
1939	Henry Goes Arizona	Molly Cullison	Edwin L. Marin	
1940	Young Tom Edison	Tannie Edison	Norman Taurog	
1940	All This and Heaven Too	Louise de Praslin	Anatole Litvak	
1940	Gold Rush Maisie	Jubie Davis	Norman Taurog	
1940	The Philadelphia Story	Dinah Lord	George Cukor	
1940	Keeping Company	Harriet Thomas	S. Sylvan Simon	
1941	Barnacle Bill	Virginia Johansen	Richard Thorpe	
1941	I'll Wait for You	Elizabeth 'Lizzie' Miller	Robert B. Sinclair	
1941	Babes on Broadway	Barbara Jo	Vincente Minnelli	
1942	Born to Sing	Patsy Eastman	Edward Ludwig	
1942	This Time for Keeps	Harriett Bryant	Charles Reisner	aka Over the Waves
1942	The Affairs of Martha	Miranda Sommerfield	Jules Dassin	
1943	The Youngest Profession	Joan Lyons	Edward Buzzell	
1943	Best Foot Forward	Helen Schlesinger	Edward Buzzell	

== Radio appearances ==
Year	Program	Episode/source
1939	The Gulf Screen Guild Theater	Never In This World with Leslie Howard and Kay Francis, Episode 012
1941	The Chase and Sanborn Program with Bergen and McCarthy	Guest Star with Abbott and Costello, Ray Noble and his Orchestra
1942	The Kraft Music Hall with Bing Crosby	Guest Star with Carole Landis
1942	Victory Theater	The Philadelphia Story with Katharine Hepburn, Cary Grant, Lt. James Stewart and Ruth Hussey
1943	Screen Guild Theater	The Youngest Profession with Edward Arnold and Jean Porter
1944	Dupont's Cavalcade of America	Junior Nurse with Jane Darwell
1945	Dupont's Cavalcade of America	Weapon 4-H with Skip Homeier
1946	Reader's Digest-Radio Edition	Do You Remember?

== Bibliography ==
- Best, Marc. Those Endearing Young Charms: Child Performers of the Screen. South Brunswick and New York: Barnes & Co., 1971, pp. 260–264.
- Parish, James Robert. Great Child Stars. New York: Ace Books, 1976.
- Willson, Dixie. Little Hollywood Stars. Akron, OH, e New York: Saalfield Pub. Co., 1935.
