= David Chandler (writer) =

American screenwriter

David Chandler (June 2, 1912 – October 19, 1990) was an American screenwriter, novelist and playwright. He published a dozen novels, and wrote screenplays for feature films and TV series. He recorded and wrote the autobiography of Joe Pasternak titled Easy the Hard Way (1956), but was probably best recognized for his novel The Gangsters (1975). He was married to Isabelle Bodkin (1940–1955) and to the actress and talent agent Rita Chandler (1957–1990).

== Works ==
=== Books ===
- Easy the Hard Way – 1956 autobiography of Joe Pasternak, G. P. Putnam's Sons (was ghostwriter)
- The Glass Totem – 1962 novel, Appleton-Century-Crofts
- The Ramsden Case – 1967 novel, Simon & Schuster
- Huelga – 1970 novel, Simon & Schuster (ISBN 978-0671206475)
- The Gangsters – 1975 novel, William Morrow and Company (ISBN 9780688003142)
- The Aphrodite – 1982 novel, Ballantine Books (ISBN 978-0345275455)

=== Produced Screenplays ===
- Apache Drums (1950)
- You Never Can Tell (1951)
- Jack McCall, Desperado (1953) - (wrote story)
- Tomahawk Trail (1957)
- Calypso Heat Wave (1957)
