= Terry (dog) =

Hollywood film performer (1933–1945)

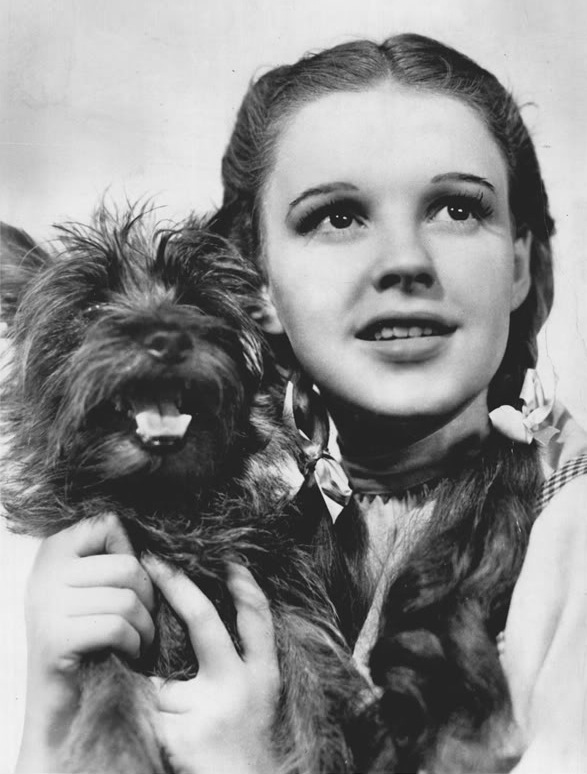
- Terry as Toto, with actress Judy Garland as Dorothy Gale, in The Wizard of Oz (1939)
- Species: Canis familiaris
- Breed: Cairn Terrier
- Sex: Female
- Born: November 17, 1933; Chicago, Illinois, U.S.
- Died: September 1, 1945 (aged 11); Hollywood, California, U.S.
- Resting place: Hollywood Forever Cemetery
- Occupation: Animal actor
- Years active: 1934–1945
- Known for: Toto in The Wizard of Oz
- Owner: Carl Spitz

Terry (November 17, 1933 – September 1, 1945) was a female Cairn Terrier who appeared in many different movies, most famously The Wizard of Oz (1939), in which she played Toto. It was her only role to receive a credit, although her name appeared as Toto. She was officially renamed in 1942 due to the popularity of the movie. She was owned and trained by Carl Spitz and Gabrielle Quinn.

== Early life and family ==
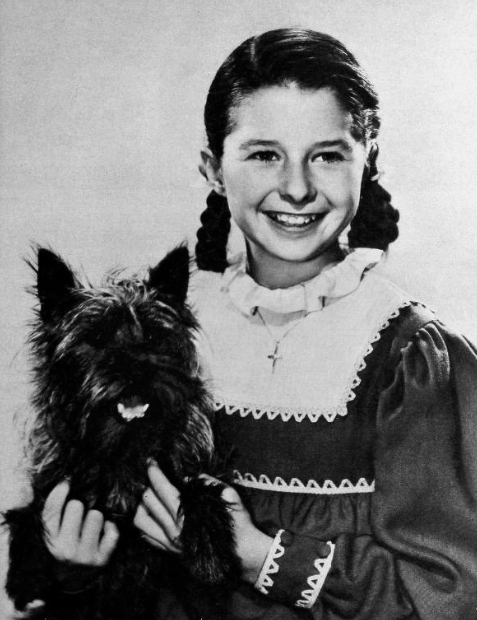
Terry as Rex with Virginia Weidler in Bad Little Angel (1939)

Terry was born in the midst of the Great Depression. She was trained and owned by Carl Spitz. She was the mother of Rommy, another movie Cairn Terrier, who appeared in other films including Reap the Wild Wind (1942) and Air Force (1943).

== Career ==
Her first film appearance was in Ready for Love (1934) which was released on November 30, 1934, roughly one month before her first major film appearance, with Shirley Temple, in Bright Eyes (1934) as Rags.

She performed her own stunts. She was seriously injured during the filming of The Wizard of Oz (1939) when one of the Winkie guards accidentally stepped on one of her paws, spraining it. Terry spent two weeks recuperating at her co-star Judy Garland's residence. Garland developed a close attachment to her. Garland offered to buy Terry from Spitz, but he refused to sell.

Terry's $125 per week salary (equivalent to $2,900 in 2025), was more than that of many human actors in the film, and also more than the average working American at the time. She attended the premiere of The Wizard of Oz at Grauman's Chinese Theatre; because of the popularity of the film, her name was formally changed to Toto in 1942.

Terry made 23 film appearances, three of which were playing in theaters at the same time in the fall of 1939: The Wizard of Oz, The Women, and Bad Little Angel. Among the last ones was Tortilla Flat (1942), in which she was reunited with Oz director Victor Fleming and Frank Morgan, who played Professor Marvel and the Wizard. Terry's final film role was in Easy to Look At, released three weeks before her death.

== Death ==
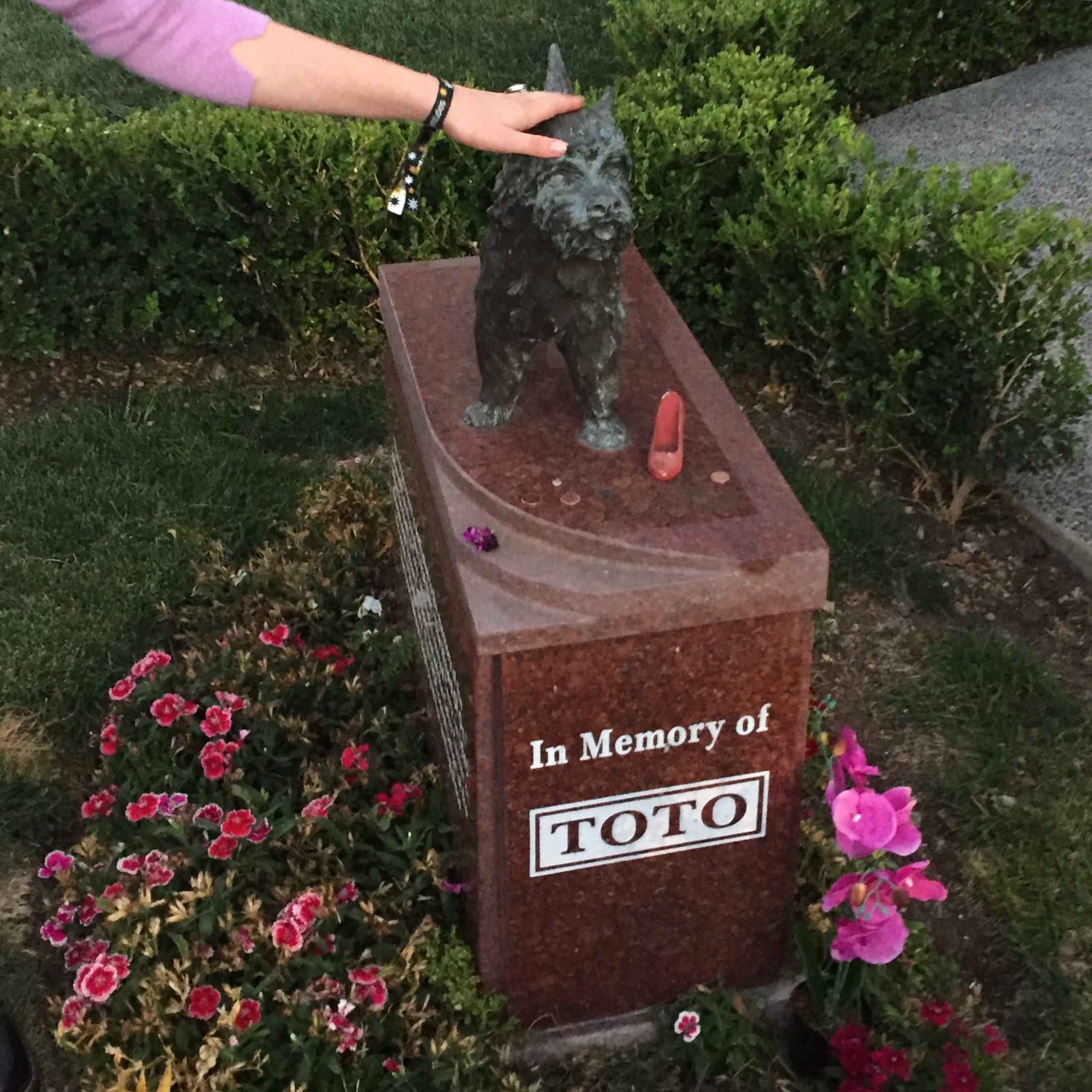
Terry/Toto's cenotaph memorial at the Hollywood Forever Cemetery

Terry died at age 11 in Hollywood on September 1, 1945. She was buried at Spitz's ranch in Studio City, Los Angeles. The grave was destroyed during the construction of the Ventura Freeway in 1958.

On June 18, 2011, a permanent memorial for Terry was dedicated at the Hollywood Forever Cemetery in Los Angeles.

== Filmography ==
- Ready for Love (1934) as Dog (uncredited)
- Bright Eyes (1934) as Rags, Loop's Dog (uncredited)
- The Dark Angel (1935) as Dog (uncredited)
- Fury (1936) as Rainbow, Joe's Dog (uncredited)
- The Buccaneer (1938) as Landlubber (uncredited)
- Barefoot Boy (1938) as herself
- Stablemates (1938) as Pet Dog (uncredited)
- The Wizard of Oz (1939) as Toto
- The Women (1939) as Fighting Dog at Beauty Shop (uncredited)
- Bad Little Angel (1939) as Rex, the Dog (uncredited)
- Calling Philo Vance (1940) as McTavish (uncredited)
- The Ghost Comes Home (1940) as Dog in Pet Shop (uncredited)
- Son of the Navy (1940) as Terry
- Cinderella's Feller (1940 short) as Rex the Dog (uncredited)
- The Old Swimmin Hole (1940) as Toto (uncredited)
- The Chocolate Soldier (1941) as Dog (uncredited)
- Rings on Her Fingers (1942) as Dog (uncredited)
- Twin Beds (1942) as Dog (uncredited)
- Tortilla Flat (1942) as Little Paelito (uncredited)
- George Washington Slept Here (1942) as Dog (uncredited)
- Back from the Front (1943) Three Stooges Short Film
- The Heavenly Body (1944) as Dog in Groomer's Tub (uncredited)
- Easy to Look At (1945) as Toto (uncredited; final film role)

== See also ==
- List of individual dogs
