= Alfred Weidler =

American architect

- Born: May 25, 1886; Georgsmarienhütte, Kingdom of Prussia, German Empire
- Died: June 16, 1966 (aged 80); Los Angeles, California, U.S.
- Occupation: Architect

Alfred Wilhelm Carl Weidler (27 May 1886, Georgsmarienhütte, Germany – 16 June 1966, Los Angeles) was an architect who, after moving from Germany to Los Angeles in 1923, went on to become a prolific model builder for 40 years with 20th Century Fox.

== Early career ==
The impetus for Weidler moving his family to America, arriving 1923, came at the collapse of the German mark after World War I. He had been in the German Army Engineering Corps during World War I. After the war, he became the city architect for Hamburg and started a family with his wife. By 1939, Weidler had made more than 500 models for Hollywood sets, large and small. And he was the author of correspondence courses in modelmaking. Hollywood, California's 4589 Lexington Avenue housed The Weidler Studio.

== Family ==
He was married in 1917 in Berlin to a former Wagnerian opera singer, Margarete Therese Louise (née Radon; 1890–1987), later known as Margaret Weidler. They had six children; the first four were Waldtraud, Verena, Werther, and Wolfgang. Waldtraud, later known as Sylvia (1919–2003), was a child actress who appeared in the 1930 film, What a Widow!.

The youngest daughter, Virginia (1927–1968), flourished as a child actress. Sons George (1926–1989), Werther (later known as Warner), and Wolfgang (later known as Walter), were musicians. George, the second youngest child, was a well-known big band saxophonist and composer, whose first marriage was to Doris Day.

== Selected publications ==
- Creative painting without a brush, a course of instructions to produce original pictures and idea sketches; a new method of designing by controlled visualization, develops creative imagination, broad conception, speed, by Alfred Weidler (1943) OCLC 23229861
- Scenic Master Stencil, by Charles William Alfred Weidler (1943)
- Varistencil Art: Art for everybody, a course of instruction to produce original paintings and idea sketches. A new method of designing by controlled visualization. Develops creative imagination, broad conception, speed. Augmented and improved edition, Vol. 36, Issue 1, (1945)

== Affiliations ==
- Member, Architects League of Hollywood
