= List of American films of 1939 =

American feature-length motion pictures released in 1939 number at least 483.

Gone with the Wind won the Academy Award for Best Picture.

== # ==
| Title | Director | Cast | Genre | Notes |
|---|---|---|---|---|
| $1,000 a Touchdown | James P. Hogan | Joe E. Brown, Martha Raye, Eric Blore, Susan Hayward | Comedy | Paramount |
| 20,000 Men a Year | Alfred E. Green | Randolph Scott, Preston Foster, Margaret Lindsay | Drama | Cosmopolitan Productions |
| 6,000 Enemies | George B. Seitz | Walter Pidgeon, Rita Johnson, Paul Kelly, Nat Pendleton | Crime drama | MGM |

== A–B ==
| Title | Director | Cast | Genre | Notes |
|---|---|---|---|---|
| Across the Plains | Spencer Gordon Bennet | Addison Randall, Frank Yaconelli, Dennis Moore | Western | Monogram |
| The Adventures of Huckleberry Finn | Richard Thorpe | Mickey Rooney, Walter Connolly, William Frawley | Drama | MGM |
| The Adventures of Jane Arden | Terry O. Morse | Rosella Towne, William Gargan, James Stephenson | Crime | Warner Bros. |
| The Adventures of Sherlock Holmes | Alfred L. Werker | Basil Rathbone, Nigel Bruce, Ida Lupino | Mystery | 20th Century Fox |
| Adventures of the Masked Phantom | Charles Abbott | Monte Rawlins, Betty Burgess, Art Davis | Western | Independent |
| All Women Have Secrets | Kurt Neumann | Virginia Dale, Joseph Allen, Jeanne Cagney | Comedy | Paramount |
| Allegheny Uprising | William A. Seiter | Claire Trevor, John Wayne, George Sanders | Adventure, Western | RKO |
| Almost a Gentleman | Leslie Goodwins | James Ellison, Helen Wood, June Clayworth | Comedy | RKO |
| The Amazing Mr. Williams | Alexander Hall | Melvyn Douglas, Joan Blondell, Ruth Donnelly | Comedy | Columbia |
| Ambush | Kurt Neumann | Lloyd Nolan, Gladys Swarthout, William Frawley | Crime | Paramount |
| Andy Hardy Gets Spring Fever | W. S. Van Dyke | Lewis Stone, Mickey Rooney, Cecilia Parker | Comedy | MGM |
| The Angels Wash Their Faces | Ray Enright | Ann Sheridan, Ronald Reagan, Billy Halop, | Drama | Warner Bros. |
| Another Thin Man | W. S. Van Dyke | William Powell, Myrna Loy, Virginia Grey | Crime | MGM |
| The Arizona Kid | Joseph Kane | Roy Rogers, George "Gabby" Hayes, Dorothy Sebastian | Western | Republic |
| Arizona Legion | David Howard | George O'Brien, Laraine Day, Chill Wills | Western | RKO |
| The Arizona Wildcat | Herbert I. Leeds | Jane Withers, Leo Carrillo, Pauline Moore | Western | 20th Century Fox |
| Arrest Bulldog Drummond | James P. Hogan | John Howard, Heather Angel, Reginald Denny | Adventure | Paramount |
| At the Circus | Edward Buzzell | Marx Brothers, Kenny Baker, Florence Rice, Eve Arden, | Comedy | MGM |
| Babes in Arms | Busby Berkeley | Mickey Rooney, Judy Garland, Charles Winninger | Musical | MGM, Based on 1937 stage show |
| Bachelor Mother | Garson Kanin | Ginger Rogers, David Niven, Charles Coburn | Comedy | RKO |
| Back Door to Heaven | William K. Howard | Wallace Ford, Aline MacMahon, Patricia Ellis | Crime | Paramount |
| Bad Boy | Herbert Meyer | Johnny Downs, Rosalind Keith, Helen MacKellar | Crime | Monogram |
| Bad Lands | Lew Landers | Robert Barrat, Douglas Walton | Western | RKO |
| Bad Little Angel | Wilhelm Thiele | Virginia Weidler, Gene Reynolds, Guy Kibbee | Drama | MGM |
| Balalaika | Reinhold Schünzel | Nelson Eddy, Ilona Massey, Charles Ruggles, Frank Morgan | Musical | MGM |
| Barricade | Gregory Ratoff | Alice Faye, Warner Baxter | Drama | 20th Century Fox |
| Beau Geste | William A. Wellman | Gary Cooper, Ray Milland, Robert Preston, Brian Donlevy, Susan Hayward | Drama | Paramount |
| Beauty for the Asking | Glenn Tryon | Lucille Ball, Patric Knowles | Drama | RKO |
| Behind Prison Gates | Charles Barton | Brian Donlevy, Julie Bishop | Crime | Columbia |
| Beware Spooks! | Edward Sedgwick | Joe E. Brown, Mary Carlisle, Clarence Kolb | Comedy | Columbia |
| The Big Guy | Arthur Lubin | Victor McLaglen, Jackie Cooper, Ona Munson | Crime | Universal |
| Big Town Czar | Arthur Lubin | Barton MacLane, Tom Brown, Eve Arden | Mystery | Universal |
| Birthright | Oscar Micheaux | Carman Newsome | Drama | |
| Blackmail | H. C. Potter | Edward G. Robinson, Ruth Hussey, Gene Lockhart | Crime drama | MGM |
| Blackwell's Island | William C. McGann | John Garfield, Rosemary Lane, Dick Purcell, Victor Jory | Crime | Warner Bros. |
| Blind Alley | Charles Vidor | Chester Morris, Ralph Bellamy, Ann Dvorak | Crime | Columbia |
| Blondie Brings Up Baby | Frank R. Strayer | Penny Singleton, Arthur Lake | Comedy | Columbia |
| Blondie Meets the Boss | Frank R. Strayer | Penny Singleton, Arthur Lake | Comedy | Columbia |
| Blondie Takes a Vacation | Frank R. Strayer | Penny Singleton, Arthur Lake | Comedy | Columbia |
| Blue Montana Skies | B. Reeves Eason | Gene Autry, Smiley Burnette | Western | Republic |
| Boy Friend | James Tinling | Jane Withers, Arleen Whelan | Comedy | 20th Century Fox |
| Boy Slaves | P. J. Wolfson | Anne Shirley, Roger Daniel | Drama | RKO |
| Boy Trouble | George Archainbaud | Charles Ruggles, Mary Boland, Donald O'Connor | Drama | Paramount |
| Boys' Reformatory | Howard Bretherton | Frankie Darro, Grant Withers | Crime | Monogram |
| Bridal Suite | Wilhelm Thiele | Annabella, Robert Young, Walter Connolly, Reginald Owen | Musical comedy | MGM |
| Broadway Serenade | Robert Z. Leonard | Jeanette MacDonald, Lew Ayres | Musical | MGM |
| The Bronze Buckaroo | Richard C. Kahn | Herb Jeffries, Lucius Brooks | Western | Hollywood Pictures |
| Bulldog Drummond's Bride | James P. Hogan | John Howard, Heather Angel, H. B. Warner, Reginald Denny | Mystery | Paramount |
| Bulldog Drummond's Secret Police | James P. Hogan | John Howard, Heather Angel, H. B. Warner, Reginald Denny | Mystery | Paramount |
| Buried Alive | Victor Halperin | Beverly Roberts, Robert Wilcox | Crime | Producers Pictures |
| Burn 'Em Up O'Connor | Edward Sedgwick | Dennis O'Keefe, Cecilia Parker, Nat Pendleton | Drama | MGM |

== C–D ==
| Title | Director | Cast | Genre | Notes |
|---|---|---|---|---|
| Cafe Society | Edward H. Griffith | Madeleine Carroll, Fred MacMurray, Shirley Ross | Romantic comedy | Paramount |
| Call a Messenger | Arthur Lubin | Billy Halop, Huntz Hall, Robert Armstrong, Mary Carlisle | Crime drama | Universal |
| Calling All Marines | John H. Auer | Don "Red" Barry, Helen Mack | Action | Republic |
| Calling Dr. Kildare | Harold S. Bucquet | Lew Ayres, Lionel Barrymore, Laraine Day, Nat Pendleton, Lana Turner | Drama | MGM |
| Captain Fury | Hal Roach | Brian Aherne, Victor McLaglen, Paul Lukas, June Lang | Adventure | Hal Roach Studios Inc. |
| Career | Leigh Jason | Anne Shirley, Edward Ellis, Samuel S. Hinds | Drama | RKO |
| The Cat and the Canary | Elliott Nugent | Bob Hope, Paulette Goddard, John Beal, Douglass Montgomery, Gale Sondergaard | Comedy | Paramount |
| Charlie Chan at Treasure Island | Norman Foster | Sidney Toler, Victor Sen Yung, Cesar Romero | Crime | 20th Century Fox |
| Charlie Chan in City in Darkness | Herbert I. Leeds | Sidney Toler, Lynn Bari | Crime | 20th Century Fox |
| Charlie Chan in Reno | Norman Foster | Sidney Toler, Ricardo Cortez, Phyllis Brooks, Slim Summerville | Crime | 20th Century Fox |
| Charlie McCarthy, Detective | Frank Tuttle | Edgar Bergen, Charlie McCarthy, Mortimer Snerd, Robert Cummings, Constance Moore | Comedy | Universal |
| Chasing Danger | Ricardo Cortez | Preston Foster, Lynn Bari, Wally Vernon, Henry Wilcoxon | Adventure | 20th Century Fox |
| Chicken Wagon Family | Herbert I. Leeds | Jane Withers, Leo Carrillo, Marjorie Weaver, Spring Byington | Comedy | 20th Century Fox |
| A Child Is Born | Lloyd Bacon | Geraldine Fitzgerald, Jeffrey Lynn, Gladys George, Gale Page, Spring Byington | Drama | Warner Bros. |
| Chip of the Flying U | Ralph Staub | Johnny Mack Brown, Bob Baker, Fuzzy Knight, Doris Weston | Western | Universal |
| The Cisco Kid and the Lady | Herbert I. Leeds | Cesar Romero, Marjorie Weaver | Western | 20th Century Fox |
| Coast Guard | Edward Ludwig | Randolph Scott, Frances Dee, Ralph Bellamy | Drama | Columbia |
| Code of the Cactus | Sam Newfield | Tim McCoy, Ben Corbett, Dorothy Short | Western | Victory Pictures Corporation |
| Code of the Fearless | Raymond K. Johnson | Fred Scott, Claire Rochelle | Western | Atlas Productions |
| Code of the Secret Service | Noel M. Smith | Ronald Reagan, Rosella Towne, Eddie Foy Jr., Moroni Olsen | Crime | Warner Bros. |
| Code of the Streets | Harold Young | Harry Carey, Frankie Thomas | Crime | Universal |
| Colorado Sunset | George Sherman | Gene Autry, June Storey, Patsy Montana | Western | Republic |
| Confessions of a Nazi Spy | Anatole Litvak | Edward G. Robinson, Francis Lederer, George Sanders, Paul Lukas | Drama | Warner Bros. |
| Conspiracy | Lew Landers | Allan Lane, Linda Hayes | Drama | |
| Convict's Code | Lambert Hillyer | Sidney Blackmer, Anne Nagel | Crime | |
| The Cowboy Quarterback | Noel M. Smith | Bert Wheeler, Marie Wilson | Comedy | Warner Bros. |
| Crashing Thru | Elmer Clifton | James Newill, Jean Carmen, Warren Hull | Western | Monogram |
| Dancing Co-Ed | S. Sylvan Simon | Lana Turner, Richard Carlson, Artie Shaw, Ann Rutherford | Romantic comedy | MGM |
| Danger Flight | Howard Bretherton | Marjorie Reynolds, Milburn Stone | Drama | |
| Dark Victory | Edmund Goulding | Bette Davis, George Brent, Humphrey Bogart, Geraldine Fitzgerald, Ronald Reagan | Drama | Warner Bros.; Academy Award nomination Best Picture |
| Daughter of the Tong | Bernard B. Ray | Evelyn Brent, Grant Withers | Drama | Metropolitan |
| Daughters Courageous | Michael Curtiz | John Garfield, Claude Rains, Fay Bainter | Drama | Warner Bros. |
| The Day the Bookies Wept | Leslie Goodwins | Betty Grable | Comedy | RKO |
| Day-Time Wife | Gregory Ratoff | Tyrone Power, Linda Darnell | Romantic comedy | |
| Death of a Champion | Robert Florey | Virginia Dale, Donald O'Connor | Mystery | |
| Death Rides the Range | Sam Newfield | Fay McKenzie, Ken Maynard | Western | |
| Destry Rides Again | George Marshall | Marlene Dietrich, James Stewart | Western | Universal |
| Devil's Island | William Clemens | Boris Karloff, James Stephenson | Suspense | |
| Disbarred | Robert Florey | Gail Patrick, Robert Preston | Drama | |
| Disputed Passage | Frank Borzage | Dorothy Lamour, Akim Tamiroff | Drama | Paramount |
| Dodge City | Michael Curtiz | Errol Flynn, Olivia de Havilland, Ann Sheridan, Bruce Cabot, Frank McHugh | Western | Warner Bros. |
| Drums Along the Mohawk | John Ford | Claudette Colbert, Henry Fonda | Western | 20th Century Fox |
| Dust Be My Destiny | Lewis Seiler | John Garfield, Priscilla Lane | Drama | |

== E–F ==
| Title | Director | Cast | Genre | Notes |
|---|---|---|---|---|
| Each Dawn I Die | William Keighley | James Cagney, George Raft, Jane Bryan | Crime | Warner Bros. |
| The Escape | Ricardo Cortez | Amanda Duff, Kane Richmond, June Gale | Action | 20th Century Fox |
| Escape to Paradise | Erle C. Kenton | Kent Taylor, Joyce Compton | Drama | |
| Espionage Agent | Lloyd Bacon | Joel McCrea, Brenda Marshall, George Bancroft | Drama | Warner Bros. |
| Eternally Yours | Tay Garnett | Loretta Young, David Niven | Comedy | |
| Everybody's Baby | Malcolm St. Clair (filmmaker) | Shirley Deane | Comedy | |
| Everybody's Hobby | William C. McGann | Irene Rich, Jackie Moran | Comedy | |
| Everything Happens at Night | Irving Cummings | Sonja Henie, Ray Milland, Robert Cummings | Comedy | 20th Century Fox |
| Ex-Champ | Phil Rosen | Victor McLaglen, Tom Brown, Nan Grey | Sports drama | |
| Exile Express | Otis Garrett | Anna Sten, Alan Marshal | Drama | Grand National Films Inc. |
| The Family Next Door | Joseph Santley | Hugh Herbert, Joy Hodges, Eddie Quillan, Ruth Donnelly | Comedy | Universal Pictures |
| Fast and Furious | Busby Berkeley | Ann Sothern, Franchot Tone | Comedy | MGM |
| Fast and Loose | Edwin L. Marin | Robert Montgomery, Rosalind Russell | Comedy | MGM |
| Fifth Avenue Girl | Gregory La Cava | Ginger Rogers, Walter Connolly, Verree Teasdale | Comedy | RKO |
| The Fighting Gringo | David Howard | George O'Brien, Lupita Tovar | Western | |
| First Love | Henry Koster | Deanna Durbin, Robert Stack, Eugene Pallette | Musical | Universal |
| First Offenders | Frank McDonald | Beverly Roberts, Walter Abel | Drama | Columbia |
| Five Came Back | John Farrow | Chester Morris, Lucille Ball, Wendy Barrie | Drama | RKO |
| Five Little Peppers and How They Grew | Charles Barton | Edith Fellows, Charles Peck, Tommy Bond, Jimmy Leake, Dorothy Ann Sease | Family | Columbia Pictures |
| Fixer Dugan | Lew Landers | Lee Tracy, Peggy Shannon | Comedy | |
| Flight at Midnight | Sidney Salkow | Phil Regan, Jean Parker | Drama | Republic |
| The Flying Deuces | A. Edward Sutherland | Stan Laurel, Oliver Hardy, Jean Parker | Comedy | RKO |
| The Flying Irishman | Leigh Jason | Douglas Corrigan | Biographical | RKO |
| Four Wives | Michael Curtiz | Priscilla Lane, Rosemary Lane, Lola Lane | Drama | Warner Bros. |
| Frontier Marshal | Allan Dwan | Randolph Scott, Nancy Kelly, Cesar Romero | Western | 20th Century Fox |
| Frontiers of '49 | Joseph Levering | Wild Bill Elliott, Luana Alcañiz, Charles King | Western | Columbia |

== G–H ==
| Title | Director | Cast | Genre | Notes |
|---|---|---|---|---|
| Geronimo | Paul Sloane | Preston Foster, Ellen Drew, Andy Devine | Western | Paramount |
| The Girl and the Gambler | Lew Landers | Tim Holt, Steffi Duna | Western | RKO |
| The Girl from Mexico | Leslie Goodwins | Lupe Vélez, Leon Errol | Comedy | RKO |
| Golden Boy | Rouben Mamoulian | Barbara Stanwyck, Adolphe Menjou, William Holden, Lee J. Cobb | Drama | Columbia |
| Gone with the Wind | Victor Fleming | Clark Gable, Vivien Leigh, Leslie Howard, Olivia de Havilland, Hattie McDaniel, Butterfly McQueen | Drama | MGM, Academy Award Best Picture; 10 Oscars, 13 nominations |
| Good Girls Go to Paris | Alexander Hall | Melvyn Douglas, Joan Blondell | Comedy | |
| The Gorilla | Allan Dwan | Ritz Brothers, Anita Louise, Patsy Kelly | Comedy | 20th Century Fox |
| The Gracie Allen Murder Case | Alfred E. Green | Gracie Allen, Warren William, Ellen Drew | Mystery | Paramount |
| Grand Jury Secrets | James P. Hogan | Gail Patrick, John Howard | Comedy | Paramount |
| The Great Commandment | Irving Pichel | Albert Dekker, John Beal | Biblical | 20th Century Fox |
| The Great Man Votes | Garson Kanin | John Barrymore, Virginia Weidler | Drama | RKO |
| The Great Victor Herbert | Andrew L. Stone | Mary Martin, Allan Jones | Biographical | Paramount |
| Gulliver's Travels | Dave Fleischer | Pinto Colvig, Jack Mercer | Animated | Paramount |
| Gunga Din | George Stevens | Cary Grant, Victor McLaglen, Douglas Fairbanks Jr., Sam Jaffe | Adventure | RKO |
| The Hardys Ride High | George B. Seitz | Mickey Rooney, Lewis Stone, Fay Holden | Comedy | MGM |
| Hawaiian Nights | Albert S. Rogell | Constance Moore, Johnny Downs | Romance | |
| Heaven with a Barbed Wire Fence | Ricardo Cortez | Glenn Ford, Jean Rogers, Ward Bond | Drama | Columbia |
| Hell's Kitchen | Ewald André Dupont, Lewis Seiler | Dead End Kids, Billy Halop, Bobby Jordan, Leo Gorcey, Ronald Reagan | Drama | Warner Bros. |
| Here I Am a Stranger | Roy Del Ruth | Richard Dix, Richard Greene | Drama | 20th Century Fox |
| Henry Goes Arizona | Edwin L. Marin | Frank Morgan, Virginia Weidler, Guy Kibbee | Western | MGM |
| Heroes in Blue | William Watson | Dick Purcell, Bernadene Hayes | Drama | |
| Hollywood Cavalcade | Irving Cummings, Malcolm St. Clair | Alice Faye, Don Ameche | Comedy | 20th Century Fox |
| Homicide Bureau | Charles C. Coleman | Bruce Cabot, Rita Hayworth, Marc Lawrence | Action | Columbia |
| Honeymoon in Bali | Edward H. Griffith | Madeleine Carroll, Fred MacMurray | Comedy | Paramount |
| The Honeymoon's Over | Eugene Forde | Stuart Erwin, Marjorie Weaver | Comedy | 20th Century Fox |
| Honolulu | Edward Buzzell | Eleanor Powell, Burns and Allen | Musical | MGM |
| Hotel for Women | Gregory Ratoff | Ann Sothern, Linda Darnell, James Ellison | Drama | Cosmopolitan Productions/20th Century Fox |
| The Hound of the Baskervilles | Sidney Lanfield | Basil Rathbone, Nigel Bruce, Richard Greene | Mystery | 20th Century Fox |
| The House of Fear | Joe May | William Gargan, Irene Hervey | Horror | |
| The Housekeeper's Daughter | Hal Roach | Joan Bennett, John Hubbard | Comedy | |
| The Hunchback of Notre Dame | William Dieterle | Charles Laughton, Maureen O'Hara | Drama | RKO |

== I–J ==
| Title | Director | Cast | Genre | Notes |
|---|---|---|---|---|
| The Ice Follies of 1939 | Reinhold Schünzel | Joan Crawford, James Stewart, Lew Ayres, Lewis Stone | Musical | MGM |
| Idiot's Delight | Clarence Brown | Norma Shearer, Clark Gable, Edward Arnold | Comedy | MGM |
| I'm from Missouri | Theodore Reed | Bob Burns, Gladys George, Patricia Morison | Comedy | Paramount |
| In Name Only | John Cromwell | Carole Lombard, Cary Grant, Kay Francis | Drama | RKO |
| Indianapolis Speedway | Lloyd Bacon | Pat O'Brien, Ann Sheridan, John Payne | Drama | Warner Bros. |
| Intermezzo | Gregory Ratoff | Leslie Howard, Ingrid Bergman | Romantic drama | United Artists; Bergman's American film debut |
| The Invisible Killer | Sam Newfield | Grace Bradley, Roland Drew, William Newell | Mystery | PRC |
| Invisible Stripes | Lloyd Bacon | George Raft, Jane Bryan, William Holden | Crime | Warner Bros. |
| Invitation to Happiness | Wesley Ruggles | Irene Dunne, Fred MacMurray, Charlie Ruggles | Drama | Paramount |
| I Stole a Million | Frank Tuttle | George Raft, Claire Trevor | Crime | Universal |
| It Could Happen to You | Alfred L. Werker | Gloria Stuart, Stuart Erwin | Comedy | 20th Century Fox |
| It's a Wonderful World | W. S. Van Dyke | Claudette Colbert, James Stewart, Guy Kibbee, Nat Pendleton | Romantic comedy | MGM |
| I Was a Convict | Aubrey Scotto | Barton MacLane, Beverly Roberts | Crime | Republic |
| Jesse James | Henry King | Tyrone Power, Henry Fonda, Nancy Kelly, Randolph Scott | Western | 20th Century Fox |
| Joe and Ethel Turp Call on the President | Robert B. Sinclair | Ann Sothern, Lewis Stone, Walter Brennan | Comedy | MGM |
| The Jones Family in Hollywood | Malcolm St. Clair | Spring Byington, June Carlson | Comedy | 20th Century Fox |
| Juarez | William Dieterle | Paul Muni, Bette Davis, Brian Aherne, Claude Rains | Biopic | Warner Bros. |
| Judge Hardy and Son | George B. Seitz | Mickey Rooney, Lewis Stone, Fay Holden | Comedy | MGM |

== K–L ==
| Title | Director | Cast | Genre | Notes |
|---|---|---|---|---|
| The Kansas Terrors | George Sherman | Robert Livingston, Duncan Renaldo, Julie Bishop | Western | Republic |
| The Kid from Kokomo | Lewis Seiler | Pat O'Brien, Wayne Morris, Joan Blondell | Comedy | Warner Bros. |
| The Kid from Texas | S. Sylvan Simon | Dennis O'Keefe, Florence Rice, Jessie Ralph, Buddy Ebsen | Western | MGM |
| King of the Turf | Alfred E. Green | Adolphe Menjou, Dolores Costello, Roger Daniel | Drama | United Artists |
| King of the Underworld | Lewis Seiler | Humphrey Bogart, Kay Francis, James Stephenson | Crime | Warner Bros. |
| Konga, the Wild Stallion | Sam Nelson | Fred Stone, Rochelle Hudson, Richard Fiske | Western | Columbia |
| Lady of the Tropics | Jack Conway | Robert Taylor, Hedy Lamarr, Joseph Schildkraut | Romantic drama | MGM |
| The Lady's from Kentucky | Alexander Hall | George Raft, Ellen Drew, Hugh Herbert | Drama | |
| Laugh It Off | Albert S. Rogell | Johnny Downs, Constance Moore | Musical, Comedy | |
| Law of the Pampas | Nate Watt | William Boyd, Steffi Duna, Sidney Toler | Western | Paramount |
| Let Freedom Ring | Jack Conway | Nelson Eddy, Virginia Bruce, Victor McLaglen, Lionel Barrymore | Musical | MGM |
| Let Us Live | John Brahm | Maureen O'Sullivan, Henry Fonda, Ralph Bellamy | Crime thriller | Columbia |
| The Light That Failed | William A. Wellman | Ronald Colman, Walter Huston, Ida Lupino | Drama | based on novel by Rudyard Kipling |
| The Little Princess | Walter Lang | Shirley Temple, Richard Greene, Anita Louise | Drama | 20th Century Fox |
| The Lone Wolf Spy Hunt | Peter Godfrey | Warren William, Ida Lupino, Rita Hayworth | Mystery | Columbia |
| Love Affair | Leo McCarey | Irene Dunne, Charles Boyer | Drama | RKO; Remade in 1994 |
| Lucky Night | Norman Taurog | Myrna Loy, Robert Taylor | Drama | MGM |

== M–N ==
| Title | Director | Cast | Genre | Notes |
|---|---|---|---|---|
| Made for Each Other | John Cromwell | James Stewart, Carole Lombard, Charles Coburn | Romance | Selznick, United Artists |
| The Mad Empress | Miguel Contreras Torres | Conrad Nagel, Medea de Novara | Drama | Warner Bros. |
| The Magnificent Fraud | Robert Florey | Akim Tamiroff, Lloyd Nolan, Patricia Morison | Comedy | Paramount |
| Main Street Lawyer | Dudley Murphy | Anita Louise | Drama | Republic |
| Maisie | Edwin L. Marin | Robert Young, Ann Sothern, Ruth Hussey | Comedy | MGM, first of 10 "Maisie" films |
| Man About Town | Mark Sandrich | Jack Benny, Dorothy Lamour | Comedy | Paramount |
| The Man in the Iron Mask | James Whale | Louis Hayward, Joan Bennett, Warren William | Adventure | United Artists |
| Man of Conquest | George Nicholls Jr. | Richard Dix, Gail Patrick, Joan Fontaine | Biography | Republic |
| The Man They Could Not Hang | Nick Grinde (as Nick Grindé) | Boris Karloff | Horror | Columbia |
| The Man Who Dared | Crane Wilbur | Jane Bryan, Charley Grapewin | Crime | Warner Bros. |
| The Marshal of Mesa City | David Howard | George O'Brien, Virginia Vale | Western | RKO |
| Mexicali Rose | George Sherman | Gene Autry, Smiley Burnette | Western | Republic |
| Midnight | Mitchell Leisen | Claudette Colbert, Don Ameche, John Barrymore | Romantic comedy | Paramount |
| Million Dollar Legs | Nick Grinde | Betty Grable, Buster Crabbe, Donald O'Connor | Comedy | Paramount |
| Miracles for Sale | Tod Browning | Robert Young, Florence Rice | Mystery | MGM |
| Missing Daughters | Charles C. Coleman | Richard Arlen, Rochelle Hudson, Marian Marsh, Isabel Jewell | Crime drama | Columbia |
| Missing Evidence | Phil Rosen | Preston Foster, Irene Hervey, Inez Courtney | Drama | |
| Moon Over Harlem | Edgar G. Ulmer | Bud Harris, Cora Green | Drama | |
| Mr. Moto in Danger Island | Herbert I. Leeds | Peter Lorre, Jean Hersholt | Mystery | 20th Century Fox |
| Mr. Moto's Last Warning | Norman Foster | Peter Lorre, Ricardo Cortez, Virginia Field | Mystery | 20th Century Fox |
| Mr. Moto Takes a Vacation | Norman Foster | Peter Lorre, Joseph Schildkraut, Virginia Field | Mystery | 20th Century Fox |
| Mr. Smith Goes to Washington | Frank Capra | James Stewart, Jean Arthur, Claude Rains | Drama | Columbia; 11 Academy Award nominations |
| Mr. Wong in Chinatown | William Nigh | Boris Karloff, Marjorie Reynolds, Grant Withers | Mystery | Monogram |
| My Son Is a Criminal | Charles C. Coleman (as C.C. Coleman Jr.) | Alan Baxter, Julie Bishop, Gordon Oliver, Willard Robertson | Crime | Columbia |
| My Son Is Guilty | Charles Barton | Bruce Cabot, Glenn Ford | Drama | Columbia |
| The Mysterious Miss X | Gus Meins | Mary Hart | Suspense | Republic |
| The Mystery of Mr. Wong | William Nigh | Boris Karloff, Grant Withers, Dorothy Tree | Mystery | Monogram |
| Mystery of the White Room | Otis Garrett | Bruce Cabot, Helen Mack, Joan Woodbury | Mystery | Universal |
| Nancy Drew and the Hidden Staircase | William Clemens | Bonita Granville, John Litel | Mystery | Warner Bros. |
| Nancy Drew... Reporter | William Clemens | Bonita Granville, John Litel, Frankie Thomas | Mystery | Warner Bros. |
| Nancy Drew… Trouble Shooter | William Clemens | Bonita Granville, Frankie Thomas, John Litel | Mystery | |
| Naughty but Nice | Ray Enright | Dick Powell, Ann Sheridan, Gale Page | Comedy | |
| Never Say Die | Elliott Nugent | Martha Raye, Bob Hope | Romantic comedy | Preston Sturges, Paramount |
| New Frontier | George Sherman | John Wayne, Jennifer Jones | Western | |
| News Is Made at Night | Alfred L. Werker | Preston Foster, Lynn Bari | Comedy | 20th Century Fox |
| Nick Carter, Master Detective | Jacques Tourneur | Walter Pidgeon, Rita Johnson, Henry Hull | Crime | MGM |
| The Night of Nights | Lewis Milestone | Pat O'Brien, Olympe Bradna, Roland Young | Drama | |
| The Night Riders | George Sherman | John Wayne, Ray Corrigan | Western | |
| Night Work | George Archainbaud | Mary Boland, Donald O'Connor | Comedy | |
| Ninotchka | Ernst Lubitsch | Greta Garbo, Melvyn Douglas, Ina Claire, Bela Lugosi | Romantic comedy | MGM; 4 Academy Award nominations |
| No Place to Go | Terry O. Morse | Dennis Morgan, Gloria Dickson | Comedy | |
| North of the Yukon | Sam Nelson | Charles Starrett | Western | Columbia |
| Nurse Edith Cavell | Herbert Wilcox | Anna Neagle, Edna May Oliver | Biographical | RKO |

== O–R ==
| Title | Director | Cast | Genre | Notes |
|---|---|---|---|---|
| Off the Record | James Flood | Pat O'Brien, Joan Blondell, Bobby Jordan | Drama | Warner Bros. |
| Of Mice and Men | Lewis Milestone | Burgess Meredith, Betty Field, Lon Chaney Jr. | Drama | Hal Roach Studios, United Artists |
| The Oklahoma Kid | Lloyd Bacon | James Cagney, Humphrey Bogart, Rosemary Lane, Donald Crisp | Western | Warner Bros. |
| Oklahoma Terror | Spencer Gordon Bennet | Virginia Carroll, Addison Randall | Western | |
| The Old Maid | Edmund Goulding | Bette Davis, Miriam Hopkins, George Brent | Drama | Warner Bros. |
| On Borrowed Time | Harold S. Bucquet | Lionel Barrymore, Cedric Hardwicke, Beulah Bondi, Una Merkel | Comedy | MGM |
| On Dress Parade | William Clemens | The Dead End Kids | Drama | Warner Bros. |
| On Your Toes | Ray Enright | Eddie Albert, Vera Zorina, Queenie Smith | Musical | Warner Bros. |
| Only Angels Have Wings | Howard Hawks | Cary Grant, Jean Arthur, Richard Barthelmess, Rita Hayworth | Drama | Columbia |
| On Trial | Terry O. Morse | John Litel, Margaret Lindsay | Drama | Warner Bros. |
| ...One Third of a Nation... | Dudley Murphy | Sylvia Sidney, Leif Erickson, Myron McCormick, Hiram Sherman | Drama | Paramount |
| Our Neighbors – The Carters | Ralph Murphy | Fay Bainter | Comedy | |
| Outlaws' Paradise | Sam Newfield | Tim McCoy, Joan Barclay | Western | |
| Outpost of the Mounties | Charles C. Coleman | Charles Starrett | Western | Columbia |
| Outside These Walls | Ray McCarey | Dolores Costello, Virginia Weidler | Drama | |
| Overland Mail | Robert F. Hill | Jack Randall, Vince Barnett, Dennis Moore | Western | Monogram |
| Pacific Liner | Lew Landers | Victor McLaglen, Wendy Barrie | Drama | RKO |
| Panama Lady | Jack Hively | Lucille Ball, Allan Lane | Comedy | |
| Paris Honeymoon | Frank Tuttle | Bing Crosby, Shirley Ross | Musical | |
| Persons in Hiding | Louis King | Patricia Morison, Lynne Overman | Drama | Paramount |
| Pirates of the Skies | Joseph A. McDonough | Kent Taylor, Rochelle Hudson, Regis Toomey | Drama | Universal |
| Private Detective | Noel M. Smith | Jane Wyman, Dick Foran | Mystery | Warner Bros. |
| The Private Lives of Elizabeth and Essex | Michael Curtiz | Bette Davis, Errol Flynn, Olivia de Havilland, Donald Crisp | Romantic drama | Warner Bros. |
| Quick Millions | Malcolm St. Clair | Jed Prouty, Spring Byington | Comedy | 20th Century Fox |
| Racketeers of the Range | D. Ross Lederman | Marjorie Reynolds, Chill Wills | Western | |
| Raffles | Sam Wood | David Niven, Olivia de Havilland | Crime comedy | |
| The Rains Came | Clarence Brown | Tyrone Power, Myrna Loy, George Brent, Nigel Bruce, Brenda Joyce | Romantic drama | 20th Century Fox |
| Range War | Lesley Selander | William Boyd | Western | Sherman Productions |
| The Real Glory | Henry Hathaway | Gary Cooper, David Niven, Andrea Leeds | Adventure drama | Samuel Goldwyn Productions |
| Remember? | Norman Z. McLeod | Robert Taylor, Greer Garson, Lew Ayres, Billie Burke | Romantic comedy | MGM |
| Reno | John Farrow | Gail Patrick, Anita Louise | Drama | |
| The Return of Doctor X | Vincent Sherman | Wayne Morris, Rosemary Lane, Humphrey Bogart | Science fiction | Warner Bros. |
| Rio | John Brahm | Basil Rathbone, Robert Cummings, Sigrid Gurie | Drama | Universal |
| The Roaring Twenties | Raoul Walsh | James Cagney, Priscilla Lane, Humphrey Bogart | Crime thriller | Warner Bros. |
| Romance of the Redwoods | Charles Vidor | Charles Bickford, Jean Parker | Adventure | Columbia |
| Rose of Washington Square | Gregory Ratoff | Alice Faye, Tyrone Power | Romantic comedy | |
| Rulers of the Sea | Frank Lloyd | Douglas Fairbanks Jr., Margaret Lockwood, Will Fyffe | Historical drama | Paramount |

== S–T ==
| Title | Director | Cast | Genre | Notes |
|---|---|---|---|---|
| The Saint in London | John Paddy Carstairs | George Sanders, Sally Gray, Gordon McLeod | Mystery | RKO |
| The Saint Strikes Back | John Farrow | George Sanders, Wendy Barrie | Crime | RKO |
| Second Fiddle | Sidney Lanfield | Sonja Henie, Tyrone Power, Rudy Vallée | Musical romance | 20th Century Fox |
| The Secret of Dr. Kildare | Harold S. Bucquet | Lew Ayres, Lionel Barrymore, Lionel Atwill | Drama | MGM |
| Secret Service of the Air | Noel M. Smith | Ronald Reagan, John Litel, Ila Rhodes | Crime | Warner Bros. |
| Sergeant Madden | Josef von Sternberg | Wallace Beery, Tom Brown, Alan Curtis, Laraine Day | Crime | MGM |
| She Married a Cop | Sidney Salkow | Jean Parker, Phil Regan | Comedy | |
| Silver on the Sage | Lesley Selander | William Boyd, George "Gabby" Hayes, Russell Hayden | Western | |
| Smashing the Money Ring | Terry O. Morse | Ronald Reagan, Margot Stevenson | Crime | Warner Bros. |
| Society Lawyer | Edwin L. Marin | Walter Pidgeon, Virginia Bruce, Leo Carrillo, Eduardo Ciannelli | Crime | MGM |
| Some Like It Hot | George Archainbaud | Bob Hope, Shirley Ross, Gene Krupa | Musical, Comedy | Paramount |
| Son of Frankenstein | Rowland V. Lee | Bela Lugosi, Boris Karloff | Horror | Universal |
| Sorority House | John Farrow | Anne Shirley, James Ellison | Drama | RKO |
| S.O.S. Tidal Wave | John H. Auer | Ralph Byrd | Crime | |
| Stagecoach | John Ford | John Wayne, Claire Trevor, Berton Churchill, Thomas Mitchell, John Carradine, Tim Holt | Western | Wanger Productions, United Artists; 7 Oscar nominations |
| Stand Up and Fight | W. S. Van Dyke | Wallace Beery, Robert Taylor | Drama | |
| Stanley and Livingstone | Henry King, Otto Brower | Spencer Tracy, Nancy Kelly, Richard Greene | Historical drama | 20th Century Fox |
| The Star Maker | Roy Del Ruth | Bing Crosby, Louise Campbell | Musical | Paramount |
| St. Louis Blues | Raoul Walsh | Dorothy Lamour, Lloyd Nolan | Musical | |
| The Story of Vernon and Irene Castle | H. C. Potter | Fred Astaire, Ginger Rogers, Edna May Oliver, Walter Brennan | Musical | RKO |
| The Stranger from Texas | Sam Nelson | Charles Starrett, Lorna Gray | Western | Columbia Pictures |
| Stronger Than Desire | Leslie Fenton | Virginia Bruce, Walter Pidgeon, Lee Bowman, Rita Johnson, Ann Dvorak | Drama | MGM |
| Sudden Money | Nick Grinde | Charles Ruggles, Marjorie Rambeau | Comedy | Warner Bros. |
| The Sun Never Sets | Rowland V. Lee | Douglas Fairbanks Jr., Basil Rathbone | Drama | |
| Sunset Trail | Lesley Selander | William Boyd, George "Gabby" Hayes, Charlotte Wynters | Western | Paramount |
| Susannah of the Mounties | William A. Seiter | Shirley Temple, Randolph Scott, Margaret Lockwood | Western | 20th Century Fox |
| Swanee River | Sidney Lanfield | Don Ameche, Andrea Leeds | Biopic | 20th Century Fox |
| Sweepstakes Winner | William C. McGann | Marie Wilson, Johnnie Davis, Allen Jenkins | Comedy | Warner Bros. |
| Tail Spin | Roy Del Ruth | Alice Faye, Constance Bennett, Nancy Kelly | Adventure | 20th Century Fox |
| Tarzan Finds a Son! | Richard Thorpe | Johnny Weissmuller, Maureen O'Sullivan, Johnny Sheffield | Adventure | MGM; Co-production with France and Switerland |
| Television Spy | Edward Dmytryk | Judith Barrett, William Henry | Drama | |
| Tell No Tales | Leslie Fenton | Melvyn Douglas, Louise Platt, Gene Lockhart | Crime | MGM |
| That's Right – You're Wrong | David Butler | Kay Kyser, Adolphe Menjou, Lucille Ball | Musical comedy | RKO |
| These Glamour Girls | S. Sylvan Simon | Lew Ayres, Lana Turner, Tom Brown | Comedy | MGM |
| They All Come Out | Jacques Tourneur | Rita Johnson, Tom Neal | Drama | MGM |
| They Made Me a Criminal | Busby Berkeley | John Garfield, Dead End Kids, Claude Rains, Ann Sheridan, May Robson, Gloria Dickson | Crime | Warner Bros. |
| They Shall Have Music | Archie Mayo | Jascha Heifetz, Joel McCrea, Andrea Leeds | Musical | Samuel Goldwyn, United Artists |
| Those High Grey Walls | Charles Vidor | Walter Connolly, Onslow Stevens | Drama | |
| The Three Musketeers | Allan Dwan | Don Ameche, Ritz Brothers, Gloria Stuart | Musical comedy | 20th Century Fox |
| Three Smart Girls Grow Up | Henry Koster | Deanna Durbin, Nan Grey, Helen Parrish | Musical comedy | Universal |
| Three Sons | Jack Hively | Edward Ellis, Katharine Alexander | Drama | RKO |
| Three Texas Steers | George Sherman | John Wayne, Ray Corrigan, Max Terhune, Carole Landis | Western | Republic |
| Thunder Afloat | George B. Seitz | Wallace Beery, Chester Morris, Virginia Grey, Douglass Dumbrille | War | MGM |
| Torchy Blane in Chinatown | William Beaudine | Glenda Farrell, Barton MacLane | Mystery | Warner Bros. |
| Torchy Blane... Playing with Dynamite | Noel M. Smith | Jane Wyman, Allen Jenkins | Mystery | Warner Bros.; 9th and last of series |
| Torchy Runs for Mayor | Ray McCarey | Glenda Farrell, Barton MacLane | Mystery | Warner Bros. |
| Tower of London | Rowland V. Lee | Basil Rathbone, Boris Karloff, Barbara O'Neil | Historical | Universal |
| Tropic Fury | Christy Cabanne | Beverly Roberts, Richard Arlen | Drama | Universal |
| Trouble in Sundown | David Howard | George O'Brien, Rosalind Keith | Western | RKO |

== U–Z ==
| Title | Director | Cast | Genre | Notes |
|---|---|---|---|---|
| Undercover Doctor | Louis King | Lloyd Nolan, Janice Logan, Heather Angel | Drama | Paramount |
| Unexpected Father | Charles Lamont | Shirley Ross, Dennis O'Keefe | Comedy | Universal |
| Union Pacific | Cecil B. DeMille | Barbara Stanwyck, Joel McCrea, Akim Tamiroff | Western | Paramount |
| Unmarried | Kurt Neumann | Helen Twelvetrees, Donald O'Connor, Buck Jones | Comedy | Paramount |
| Waterfront | Terry O. Morse | Gloria Dickson, Dennis Morgan, Marie Wilson, Sheila Bromley | Drama | Warner Bros. |
| Way Down South | Leslie Goodwins | Bobby Breen, Alan Mowbray, Steffi Duna | Musical | RKO |
| We Are Not Alone | Edmund Goulding | Jane Bryan, Paul Muni | Drama | Warner Bros. |
| What a Life | Theodore Reed | Jackie Cooper, Betty Field, Janice Logan | Comedy | Paramount |
| When Tomorrow Comes | John M. Stahl | Irene Dunne, Charles Boyer | Drama | Universal |
| Wife, Husband and Friend | Gregory Ratoff | Loretta Young, Warner Baxter, Binnie Barnes | Comedy | 20th Century Fox |
| Wings of the Navy | Lloyd Bacon | George Brent, Olivia de Havilland, John Payne | Drama | Warner Bros. |
| Winner Take All | Otto Brower | Tony Martin, Gloria Stuart | Drama | 20th Century Fox |
| Within the Law | Gustav Machatý | Ruth Hussey, Tom Neal | Crime | MGM |
| The Wizard of Oz | Victor Fleming | Judy Garland, Frank Morgan, Ray Bolger, Jack Haley, Bert Lahr, Billie Burke, Charley Grapewin, Margaret Hamilton | Musical | MGM; 6 Academy Award nominations |
| The Women | George Cukor | Norma Shearer, Joan Crawford, Rosalind Russell, Paulette Goddard, Joan Fontaine, Mary Boland, Ruth Hussey | Comedy | MGM; all-female cast |
| Women in the Wind | John Farrow | Kay Francis, William Gargan, Victor Jory | Drama | Warner Bros. |
| Wuthering Heights | William Wyler | Merle Oberon, Laurence Olivier, David Niven, Flora Robson | Romantic drama | Goldwyn Company; 8 Oscar nominations |
| Wyoming Outlaw | George Sherman | John Wayne, Ray Corrigan, Raymond Hatton, Don 'Red' Barry | Western | Republic |
| Yes, My Darling Daughter | William Keighley | Priscilla Lane, Jeffrey Lynn, Roland Young, Fay Bainter | Comedy | Warner Bros. |
| You Can't Cheat an Honest Man | George Marshall | W. C. Fields, Edgar Bergen, Charlie McCarthy | Comedy | Universal |
| You Can't Get Away with Murder | Lewis Seiler | Humphrey Bogart, Gale Page, Billy Halop, John Litel | Crime | Warner Bros. |
| Young Mr. Lincoln | John Ford | Henry Fonda, Alice Brady | Biopic, Drama, History, Western | Cosmopolitan, 20th Century Fox |
| Zaza | George Cukor | Claudette Colbert, Herbert Marshall | Comedy | Paramount |
| Zenobia | Gordon Douglas | Oliver Hardy, Harry Langdon, Billie Burke | Comedy | United Artists |
| The Zero Hour | Sidney Salkow | Frieda Inescort, Otto Kruger | Drama | Republic |

== Serials ==
| Title | Director | Cast | Genre | Notes |
|---|---|---|---|---|
| Buck Rogers | Ford Beebe, Saul A. Goodkind | Buster Crabbe, Constance Moore | Science fiction | Universal |
| Dick Tracy's G-Men | William Witney | Ralph Byrd, Jennifer Jones | Serial | Republic |
| The Oregon Trail | Ford Beebe | Johnny Mack Brown, Louise Stanley | Serial | Universal |
| Zorro's Fighting Legion | William Witney | Reed Hadley, Sheila Darcy | Serial | Republic |

== See also ==
- 1939 in the United States
