= Arthur T. Horman =

American screenwriter

- Born: September 2, 1905; Chicago, Illinois, United States
- Died: November 2, 1964 (aged 59); Orange County, California, United States
- Occupation: Screenwriter
- Years active: 1934–1958

Arthur T. Horman (September 2, 1905 – November 2, 1964) was an American screenwriter whose career spanned from the 1930s to the end of the 1950s. During that time he wrote the stories or screenplays for over 60 films, as well as writing several pieces for television during the 1950s.

== Life and career ==
Horman was born on September 2, 1905, in Chicago Illinois. His first foray into the film industry was providing the story for 1934's The Meanest Gal in Town, starring ZaSu Pitts and directed by Russell Mack. After the success of that film, RKO signed him to a contract, and assigned him to work with Wanda Tuchock on Grand Old Girl (1935); By 1936 he had left RKO and was signed by the Poverty Row studio, Chesterfield-Invincible. While at C-I he did such films as the 1936 crime drama The Crime Patrol, for which he wrote the story, and It Couldn't Have Happened – But It Did, a 1936 comedy-drama directed by Phil Rosen and starring Reginald Denny, for which Horman wrote both the story and the screenplay. When Maury M. Cohen closed down Invincible and signed an agreement with RKO, Horman followed him back to his old studio. Other "B"-films on which Horman worked during this period include the story and screenplay for the crime-drama Double Danger (1938), directed by Lew Landers, the screenplay for another crime-drama, My Son Is a Criminal, directed by Charles C. Coleman, which Horman received positive notices for the plot, and the story and screenplay for another Coleman film, When G-Men Step In (1938). While working at Columbia, Horman would write the screenplay for one of their Lone Wolf series, The Lone Wolf in Paris, which was the only film in the series which stars Francis Lederer in the title role.

My Son Is a Criminal (1938) would be Horman's last screenplay for Columbia in 1938, after which he moved to Universal Pictures. His first work for Universal would be Society Smugglers in 1939, co-written with Earl Felton, which The Film Daily noted as "smartly" written in their review. It was while at Universal that he began to write more for "A"-list features. In that first year at Universal he would pen seven screenplays. After Society Smugglers, he wrote the story and co-wrote the screenplay (with Gordon Kahn) for Code of the Streets, a crime drama which stars Harry Carey, along with a group of young actors billed as the Little Tough Guys. It was Universal's second film featuring the young actors, who would become better known as The Bowery Boys. That same year he would co-write (this time with Robert Lee Johnson) another screenplay featuring the Bowery Boys, Give Us Wings, directed by Charles Lamont.

Other notable films on which he worked during the early 1940s include: the original screenplay for very successful Buck Privates, a 1940 slapstick comedy starring Bud Abbott and Lou Costello, and which turned them into legitimate movie stars; the original screenplay for another Abbott and Costello vehicle, also in 1941, In the Navy, which also stars Dick Powell; one of a team of screenwriters for the 1941 musical comedy, Navy Blues, which stars Ann Sheridan, Jack Oakie, Jack Haley, and Martha Raye; one of three screenwriters for the 1942 war film, Captains of the Clouds, starring James Cagney and Dennis Morgan, and directed by Michael Curtiz; and the original screenplay for Raoul Walsh's 1942 Academy Award nominated Desperate Journey, starring Errol Flynn and Ronald Reagan. In 1943, according to the American Film Institute database, Horman made contributions to the screenplay for the Howard Hawks' film Air Force. The screenplay credit went to Dudley Nichols, who was nominated for an Academy Award. In 1944 he co-authored the screenplay for Dark Waters, a film noir starring Merle Oberon, Franchot Tone and Thomas Mitchell, based on the novel of the same name by Frank and Marian Cockrell. In August 1944, Horman signed a contract with Universal Studios, after having co-written, along with Bart Lytton and Edmund Joseph, the screenplay for the popular Universal musical, Bowery to Broadway, directed by Charles Lamont. His first film written specifically for Universal, was an adaptation of the James Roland novel, This Way Out, late in 1944, titled The Suspect, for which he received good reviews. The film was directed by Robert Siodmak, and starred Charles Laughton and Ella Raines. His next film at Universal saw him once again writing for Abbott & Costello. Released in early 1945, Here Come the Co-Eds was co-written by John Grant, from a story by Edmund Hartmann, and directed by Jean Yarbrough.

In 1945 Horman co-wrote, with Dwight Taylor, the screenplay for the Humphrey Bogart suspense thriller Conflict. The following year, along with Sam Hellman, he would write the screenplay for the romantic screwball comedy, The Runaround, directed by Charles Lamont, and starring Ella Raines and Rod Cameron. In 1948 he co-wrote with Charles Grayson the original screenplay for the Abbott and Costello film, The Noose Hangs High, the original title of which was For Love or Money. With the advent of television, Horman would pen the first miniseries, The Living Christ, which consists of twelve half-hour episodes, and aired on NBC in 1951. Horman's career slowed down in the 1950s, he only wrote half a dozen films during the decade, one of which, Day of Triumph, was another film based on the life of Jesus. It was the last film directed by Irving Pichel, who died one week after completing the film in 1954. Horman's last two films were both for Republic Pictures in 1958, Young and Wild and Juvenile Jungle, both B-pictures directed by William Witney.

Horman was married to Eloise Horman. In June 1936 the couple had a daughter. Horman died on November 2, 1964, in Orange County, California.

== Filmography ==
(Per AFI database)

- The Meanest Gal in Town (1934)
- Grand Old Girl (1935)
- Thunder in the Night (1935)
- Welcome Home (1935)
- This Is the Life (1935)
- Ellis Island (1936)
- Easy Money (1936)
- The Bridge of Sighs (1936)
- The Crime Patrol (1936)
- It Couldn't Have Happened – But It Did (1936)
- Tango (1936)
- Three of a Kind (1936)
- My Marriage (1936)
- The Shadow (1937)
- Quick Money (1937)
- You Can't Buy Luck (1937)
- The Big Shot (1937)
- Double Danger (1938)
- Life Returns (1938)
- The Lone Wolf in Paris (1938)
- Smashing the Spy Ring (1938)
- When G-Men Step In (1938)
- My Son Is a Criminal (1939)
- Behind Prison Gates (1939)
- For Love or Money (1939)
- They Asked for It (1939)
- Code of the Streets (1939)
- Society Smugglers (1939)
- Call a Messenger (1939)
- Missing Evidence (1939)
- Give Us Wings (1940)
- I Can't Give You Anything but Love, Baby (1940)
- You're Not So Tough (1940)
- Slightly Tempted (1940)
- Oh Johnny, How You Can Love (1940)
- Argentine Nights (1940)
- The Bandit Trail (1941)
- Buck Privates (1941)
- Hello, Sucker (1941)
- In the Navy (1941)
- Navy Blues (1941)
- Captains of the Clouds (1942)
- Desperate Journey (1942)
- Obliging Young Lady (1942)
- Air Force (1943)
- Dark Waters (1944)
- Bowery to Broadway (1944)
- The Suspect (1944)
- Conflict (1945)
- Here Come the Co-Eds (1945)
- The Runaround (1946)
- The Noose Hangs High (1948)
- Undertow (1949)
- Gobs and Gals (1952)
- Tropical Heat Wave (1952)
- The WAC from Walla Walla (1952)
- Day of Triumph (1954)
- Juvenile Jungle (1958)
- Young and Wild (1958)
