= You Nazty Spy! =

1940 American film by Jules White

- Directed by: Jules White
- Written by: Clyde Bruckman; Felix Adler
- Produced by: Jules White
- Starring: Moe Howard; Larry Fine; Curly Howard; Richard Fiske; Lorna Gray; Dick Curtis; Don Beddoe; Florine Dickson; "Little Billy" Rhodes; John Tyrrell; Bert Young; Joe Murphy; Eddie Laughton
- Cinematography: Harry Davis
- Edited by: Art Seid
- Distributed by: Columbia Pictures
- Release date: January 19, 1940 (U.S.)
- Running time: 18:00
- Country: United States
- Language: English

You Nazty Spy! is a 1940 comedy film directed by Jules White and starring American slapstick comedy team The Three Stooges (Moe Howard, Larry Fine, and Curly Howard). It is the 44th short film released by Columbia Pictures starring the comedians, who released 190 short films for the studio between 1934 and 1959.

== Plot ==
Three munitions manufacturers, discontent with reduced profits due to King Herman the 6 7/8's pacifist policies, conspire to overthrow him and institute a dictatorship by finding somebody stupid enough to be a figurehead leader. The trio selects the unwitting Stooges, working as wallpaper hangers, as figureheads for their regime. Moe Hailstone assumes the role of the leader, directly spoofing Adolf Hitler; Curly Gallstone becomes Field Marshall and is a composite of Benito Mussolini and Hermann Göring; and Larry Pebble becomes Minister of Propaganda, spoofing Joseph Goebbels, respectively.

Upon seizing power, Hailstone, Gallstone, and Pebble attempt to govern Moronika. However, their incompetence and absurdity quickly unravel their authority. A subplot emerges with the arrival of Mattie Herring, who is suspected of espionage by the Stooges and subsequently sentenced to execution. Her escape only complicates matters.

The Stooges next try their hand at international diplomacy, convening a roundtable meeting where absurd demands are made of neighboring countries. After assaulting the visiting delegates and knocking them unconscious, the Stooges declare the peace conference a success. Their triumph is short-lived, however, as an angry mob converges outside the conference room, led by none other than the deposed king and Mattie Herring. Faced with imminent downfall, the Stooges flee, only to unwittingly enter a lion's den, where they are apparently devoured offscreen by the three lions.

== Significance ==
You Nazty Spy! satirized the Nazis and the Third Reich and helped publicize the Nazi threat in a period when the United States was still neutral about World War II and isolationist sentiment was prevalent among the public. During this period, isolationist senators such as Burton Wheeler and Gerald Nye objected to Hollywood films on grounds that they were anti-Nazi propaganda vehicles designed to mobilize the American public for war.

The Hays code discouraged or prohibited many types of political and satirical messages in feature films, requiring that the history and prominent people of other countries must be portrayed "fairly". Short films such as those released by the Stooges were subject to less attention than feature films.

== Production notes ==
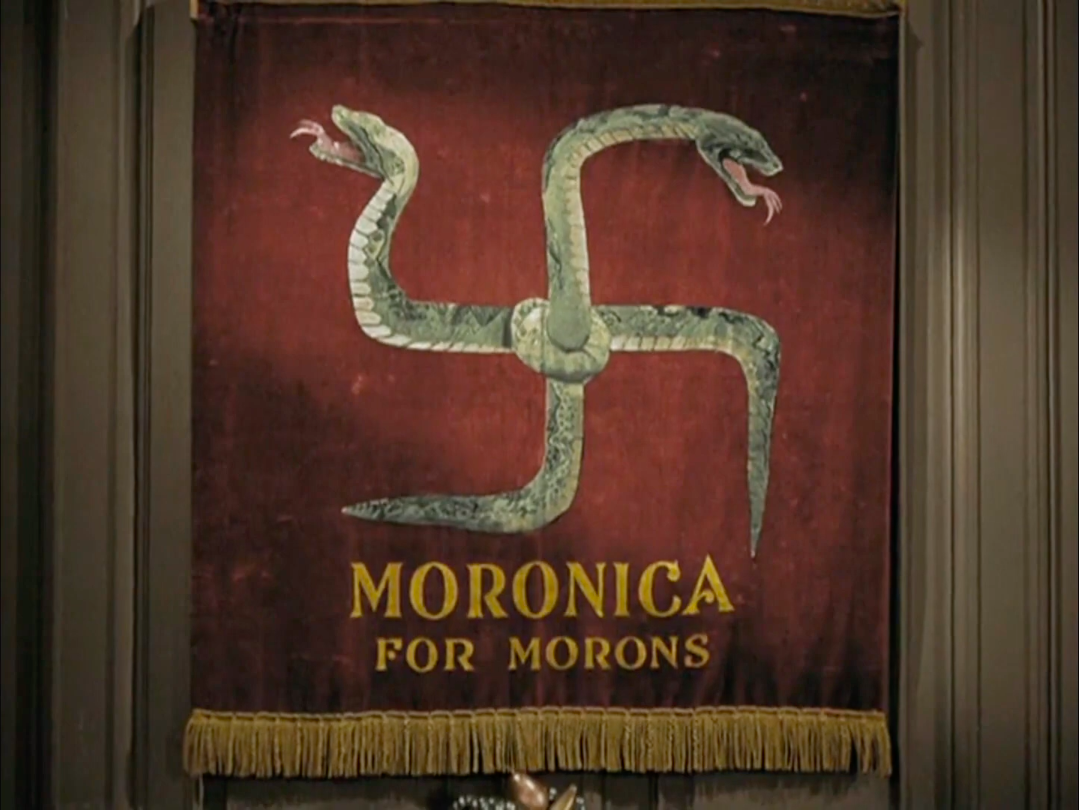
The Flag of Moronica

- The title is a parody of comedian Joe Penner's catchphrase "You Nasty Man!" as well as the 1939 Warner Bros. film Confessions of a Nazi Spy.
- Moe Howard, as "Moe Hailstone", became the first American actor to portray/imitate Adolf Hitler in a released film, although Chaplin's portrayal was shot before the Stooges' film went into production.
- Both Moe Howard and Larry Fine cited You Nazty Spy! as their favorite Three Stooges short.
- You Nazty Spy! was followed by a sequel, I'll Never Heil Again, in 1941. Moronika would also be the setting for Dizzy Pilots (1943).
- Larry uses the alias 'Moronica' while disguised as a woman in Higher Than a Kite (1943).
- The parody of the Nazi banner with two snakes in the form of a swastika is captioned with the phrase "Moronika for Morons" which is a play on the Nazi slogan "Deutschland den Deutschen" (Germany for Germans).
- The Stooges as Ashkenazi Jews occasionally worked a word or phrase of Yiddish into their dialogue. In this short, the Stooges make several overt Jewish and Yiddish cultural references:
  - The exclamation "Beblach!" used several times in the film is a Yiddish word meaning "beans".
  - "Shalom aleichem!", literally "Peace unto you" is a standard Hebrew greeting meaning "hello, pleased to meet you".
  - In Moe's imitation of a Hitler speech, he says "in pupik gehabt haben" (the semi-obscene "I've had it in the bellybutton" in Yiddish). These references to the Nazi leadership and Hitler speaking Yiddish were particularly ironic inside jokes for the Yiddish-speaking Jewish audience. This anticipates the mock German that Charlie Chaplin would use in his dictator role in the soon to be released The Great Dictator, which the producers of this film were likely aware of.
- In a gag when Moe tries to shush Larry and Curly at a table with Mattie Herring, the boys make train noises until a conductor appears and says, "All out for Syracuse!" When Larry leaves and Mattie Herring asks where he is going, Moe replies, "The boy's from Syracuse" – a reference to the musical The Boys from Syracuse (1938).
- A colorized version of this film was released in 2004. It was part of the DVD collection entitled Stooged & Confoosed.
- You Nazty Spy was also the first Stooges short to bear a new opening title sequence, with the Columbia logo's torch-bearing woman on the left-hand corner, standing on a pedestal where each step has printed out "Columbia", "Short Subject" and "Presentation", and the opening titles and credits are inside a box with rounded edges. This format remains in effect through Booby Dupes (1945).
- When asked why they have no lions, Curly replies "Because there are no bones in ice cream." This bizarre and otherwise unexplained non-sequitur is a colloquialism of the period that would be offered as a non-sensical answer to a non-sensical question.
- Two of the lions at the end of the film are former MGM lions, "Tanner and Jackie", both of whom had previously appeared in Three Missing Links, Wee Wee Monsieur, and Movie Maniacs. The name of the third lion is unknown.
