= Roaring Frontiers =

1941 film

- Directed by: Lambert Hillyer
- Written by: Robert Lee Johnson
- Produced by: Leon Barsha
- Starring: Tex Ritter; Wild Bill Elliott; Ruth Ford
- Cinematography: Benjamin H. Kline
- Edited by: Mel Thorsen
- Production company: Columbia Pictures
- Distributed by: Columbia Pictures
- Release date: October 16, 1941
- Running time: 60 minutes
- Country: United States
- Language: English

Roaring Frontiers is a 1941 American Western film directed by Lambert Hillyer and starring Tex Ritter, Wild Bill Elliott and Ruth Ford. It was produced and distributed by Columbia Pictures. It is the eighth in Columbia Pictures' series of 12 "Wild Bill Hickok" films, followed by The Lone Star Vigilantes.

== Cast ==
- Wild Bill Elliott as Wild Bill Hickok
- Tex Ritter as Tex Martin
- Ruth Ford as Reba Bailey
- Frank Mitchell as Cannonball
- Bradley Page as Hawk Hammond
- Tristram Coffin as Bert
- Hal Taliaferro as Link Twiddle
- Francis Walker as Boot Hill - Henchman
- Joe McGuinn as Knuckles - Henchman
- George Chesebro as Red - Bartender
- Charles Stevens as Moccasin
- Hank Bell as Hank - Stage driver
- Lew Meehan as Henchman

== Bibliography ==
- Bond, Johnny. The Tex Ritter Story. Chappell Music Company, 1976.
- Parish, James Robert & Pitts, Michael R. Film directors: a guide to their American films. Scarecrow Press, 1974.
