= Boobs in Arms =

1940 American short film by Jules White

- Directed by: Jules White
- Written by: Felix Adler
- Produced by: Jules White
- Starring: Moe Howard; Larry Fine; Curly Howard; Richard Fiske; Evelyn Young; Johnny Kascier; Cy Schindell; Eddie Laughton; John Tyrrell; Lynton Brent; Philip Van Zandt
- Cinematography: John Stumar
- Edited by: Mel Thorsen
- Distributed by: Columbia Pictures
- Release date: December 27, 1940 (U.S.)
- Running time: 17:55
- Country: United States
- Language: English

Boobs in Arms is a 1940 short subject directed by Jules White starring American slapstick comedy team The Three Stooges (Moe Howard, Larry Fine and Curly Howard). It is the 52nd entry in the series released by Columbia Pictures starring the comedians, who released 190 shorts for the studio between 1934 and 1959.

== Plot ==
The Stooges are street peddler greeting card salesmen, inciting the ire of a disgruntled passerby during an accidental altercation. Their subsequent encounters lead them to the doorstep of a woman seeking help in provoking jealousy within her husband, unknowingly revisiting the same individual they had previously antagonized. Confronted once more by the aggrieved husband, the Stooges employ their pugnacious antics to defend themselves before hastily fleeing his wrath.

Upon entering the army, the Stooges face the ironic twist of having their drill instructor, Sergeant Hugh Dare, be the very man they sought to escape. Sgt. Dare subjects them to rigorous military drills and bayonet practice, resulting in a cascade of comedic mishaps. Sent to the front lines, the Stooges, opting for a nap instead of duty, inadvertently become involved in a mission involving a laughing gas shell.

After many mishaps during their attempt to fire the projectile from a cannon, the shell explodes at their feet. The Stooges are overcome with laughter as they are captured by the enemy and detained with Sgt. Dare. They remain under the influence ot the laughing gas throughout a boisterous confrontation that includes accidental injuries to both allies and adversaries.

Emerging triumphant, the Stooges find themselves under fire, narrowly avoiding each shell with laughter and mirth. The final shell propels them into the clouds, perpetuating their laughter as they ascend into an ethereal realm.

== Production notes ==
Filmed on August 15–20, 1940, the title is a parody of the 1939 MGM film Babes in Arms based on the Lorenz Hart and Richard Rodgers musical. The working title was All This and Bullets Too, a parody in itself of the title of the Warner Bros. film All This and Heaven Too.

Jules White would reuse the army drill footage for the ending of Dizzy Pilots in 1943. Joe Besser had his own version of the army drill routine, which was used on stage for the first time in April 1941 and titled "You're in the Army Now". The skit was revised with Joe Besser and his straight man Jimmy Little who first joined Joe in October 1940 in the Olsen and Johnson production of Sons of Fun (October 1941 until January 1944). White later filmed Besser's performing his army drill version of the routine in 1952 Columbia short, Aim, Fire, Scoot, and its 1956 remake, Army Daze.

Laurel and Hardy played greeting card salesmen who try to make a married woman's husband jealous in 1935's The Fixer Uppers.

After joining the army, Curly beings to recite lyrics from the song "You're in the Army Now". After Curly says "You'll never get rich," Moe stops him before he can utter the next line, sometimes sung as "You son of a bitch".

The closing gag of a person riding a bombshell through the air would be re-created by Slim Pickens in 1964's Dr. Strangelove or: How I Learned to Stop Worrying and Love the Bomb.

Curly's print ad for "O'Brien's Kosher Restaurant" has "dessert" intentionally misspelled as "desert".

=== Hollywood and the Selective Training and Service Act of 1940 ===
The Selective Training and Service Act of 1940 was passed by the United States Congress on September 16, 1940, becoming the first peacetime conscription in United States history. Hollywood reflected the interest of the American public in Conscription in the United States by having nearly every film studio bring out a military film comedy in 1941 with their resident comedian(s):

- Universal Pictures' Abbott and Costello released the first feature film on the subject with Buck Privates, followed by In the Navy and the United States Army Air Corps to Keep 'Em Flying.
- Paramount Pictures featured Bob Hope in Caught in the Draft.
- Warner Bros. featured Phil Silvers and Jimmy Durante in You're in the Army Now.
- Columbia Pictures featured Fred Astaire in the army declaring You'll Never Get Rich.
- Hal Roach gave his new comedy team of William Tracy and Joe Sawyer Tanks a Million.
- 20th Century Fox had former Hal Roach team of Laurel and Hardy in Great Guns.
- Walt Disney Productions featured Donald Duck in the Army Air Forces in six cartoons, starting with Donald Gets Drafted.
- Republic Pictures provided Bob Crosby and Eddie Foy Jr. as Rookies on Parade.
- Monogram Pictures enlisted Nat Pendleton as Top Sergeant Mulligan.
- Famous Studios had Popeye the Sailor enlisted in The Mighty Navy.

However, the first comedians to appear in an army comedy were the Stooges with Boobs in Arms. Columbia Pictures placed the Stooges in an unnamed army with military uniforms consisting of Zorro hats and tan uniforms with sergeant chevrons worn upside down to the American way; they are also armed with Civil War-type muskets instead of modern rifles.
