= The Officer and the Lady =

1941 film directed by Sam White

- Directed by: Sam White
- Screenplay by: Lambert Hillyer; Joseph Hoffman
- Story by: Lambert Hillyer
- Produced by: Leon Barsha
- Starring: Rochelle Hudson; Bruce Bennett; Roger Pryor; Richard Fiske
- Cinematography: George Meehan
- Edited by: Richard Fantl
- Music by: Morris Stoloff
- Production company: Columbia Pictures
- Distributed by: Columbia Pictures
- Release date: October 12, 1941
- Running time: 59 minutes
- Country: United States
- Language: English

The Officer and the Lady is a 1941 American crime film directed by Sam White and starring Rochelle Hudson, Bruce Bennett, Roger Pryor and Richard Fiske. The film was produced and distributed by Columbia Pictures.

== Synopsis ==
Helen Regan's father was a police officer who was badly injured in the line of duty. This makes her hesitant towards a young policeman Bob Conlon despite her feelings towards him. However Bob proves his worth by rescuing her and her father from an escaped convict after revenge against the ex-cop.

== Cast ==
- Rochelle Hudson as Helen Regan
- Bruce Bennett as Bob Conlon
- Roger Pryor as Johnny Davis
- Richard Fiske as Ace Quinn
- Sidney Blackmer as Blake Standish
- Tom Kennedy as Bumps O'Neil
- Oscar O'Shea as Dan Regan
- Joe McGuinn as Frank
- Charles C. Wilson as Police Captain Hart
- William Hall as Dawson

== Bibliography ==
- Fetrow, Alan G. Feature Films, 1940-1949: a United States Filmography. McFarland, 1994.
