= Richard Fiske =

American actor (1915–1944)

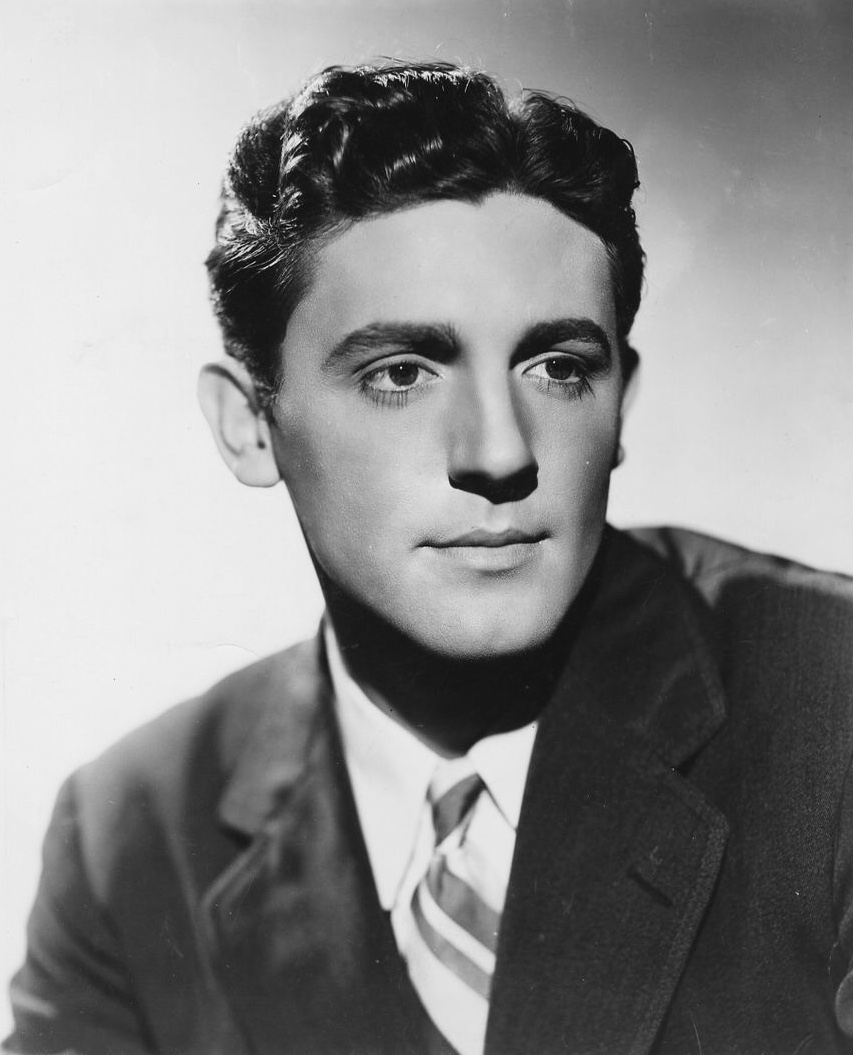
- Fiske, circa September 1938
- Born: Thomas Ralph Potts; November 20, 1914; Shelton, Washington, U.S.
- Died: August 10, 1944 (aged 29); La Croix-Avranchin, France
- Cause of death: Killed in action
- Resting place: Brittany American Cemetery and Memorial, Basse-Normandie, France
- Education: University of Washington
- Occupation: Actor
- Years active: 1938–1942
- Spouse: Marjorie MacGregor (m. 1939; div. 1944)

Thomas Ralph Potts (November 20, 1914 – August 10, 1944) was an American film actor best known by his stage name Richard Fiske. He appeared in more than 80 films between 1938 and 1942, almost exclusively for Columbia Pictures.

== Biography ==
Potts was born in Shelton, Washington, to Frank Potts and Bernice Fiske. After graduating from Longview High School, he worked in local radio. He attended the University of Washington for a year. The tall, handsome young actor made a screen test for Columbia Pictures and was signed to a contract in 1938. Originally rechristened "Robert Fiske" for the screen, he had to adopt the name Richard Fiske because another actor named Robert Fiske was already working in the movie industry.

Columbia introduced Richard Fiske as a juvenile lead in its Edith Fellows features, and as the second lead in its popular serial The Spider's Web (1938). From then on he was one of the studio's busiest actors, appearing regularly in the studio's "B" pictures, westerns, serials, and short subjects, including frequent castings in Charles Starrett and Bill Elliott westerns; the Blondie, The Lone Wolf, and Boston Blackie series; and equally frequent work with short-subject comedians Charley Chase, Andy Clyde, and Buster Keaton. He is best known by today's viewers for his portrayals of neurotic foils to The Three Stooges. Perhaps his most familiar role is that of the irate husband-turned-drill sergeant in 1940's Boobs in Arms. Three years later, this performance was edited into the Stooge short Dizzy Pilots. His last film role was Ginger Rogers' fiancé in the Billy Wilder comedy The Major and the Minor.

Potts married Marjorie MacGregor in December 1939; the couple was divorced in April 1944.

Potts' brief acting career was cut short when he joined the U.S. Army in May 1942. Commissioned as a lieutenant, he was killed in action in August 1944 at La Croix-Avranchin, France, while serving with the 9th Infantry Regiment, 2nd Infantry Division. He was posthumously awarded the Purple Heart, Bronze Star Medal, and several other military honors. He is buried at Brittany American Cemetery and Memorial, Basse-Normandie, France.

== Selected filmography ==
- Juvenile Court (1938) - Spectator at Accident (uncredited)
- Girls' School (1938) - Sugar - Myra's First Dance Partner (uncredited)
- The Spider's Web (1938, Serial) - Jackson
- In Early Arizona (1938) - Gambler (uncredited)
- Blondie (1938) - Nelson - Dithers' Employee (uncredited)
- The Little Adventuress (1938) - Dick Horton
- Homicide Bureau (1939) - Hank
- Flying G-Men (1939, Serial) - Bart Davis
- Blondie Meets the Boss (1939) - Nelson
- Romance of the Redwoods (1939) - Logger (uncredited)
- North of the Yukon (1939) - Mart Duncan
- Outside These Walls (1939) - Prisoner (uncredited)
- Missing Daughters (1939) - 2nd Attendant (uncredited)
- Pest from the West (1939, Short) - Ferdinand the Bullfighter
- Good Girls Go to Paris (1939) - Student (uncredited)
- The Man from Sundown (1939) - Tom Kellogg
- Overland with Kit Carson (1939, Serial) - Lieutenant David Brent
- Behind Prison Gates (1939) - Agent Lyman
- Konga, the Wild Stallion (1939) - Steve Calhoun
- Parents on Trial (1939) - Lawrence Hastings
- Oily to Bed, Oily to Rise (1939, Short) - Mr. Johnson - Farmer (uncredited)
- The Taming of the West (1939) - Blacksmith (uncredited)
- Scandal Sheet (1939) - Student
- Blondie Brings Up Baby (1939) - Dithers' Employee (uncredited)
- Three Sappy People (1939, Short) - Party Guest (uncredited)
- The Stranger from Texas (1939) - Ned Browning
- My Son Is Guilty (1939) - Mac (uncredited)
- You Nazty Spy! (1940, Short) - Mr. Ixnay (uncredited)
- The Lone Wolf Strikes (1940) - Officer in Chase Car (uncredited)
- Convicted Woman (1940) - Hank (uncredited)
- Five Little Peppers at Home (1940) - Aunt Martha's Chauffeur (uncredited)
- Pioneers of the Frontier (1940) - Henchman Bart
- The Man from Tumbleweeds (1940) - Ranger Slash (Henchman Slash in credits)
- Men Without Souls (1940) - Crowley
- Island of Doomed Men (1940) - Hale (uncredited)
- Texas Stagecoach (1940) - Workman (uncredited)
- The Lone Wolf Meets a Lady (1940) - Detective Jackson (uncredited)
- Before I Hang (1940) - Mandish (uncredited)
- Glamour for Sale (1940) - Club Bartender (uncredited)
- Prairie Schooners (1940) - Adams
- So You Won't Talk (1940) - Cop (uncredited)
- Blondie Plays Cupid (1940) - Nelson (uncredited)
- Girls Under 21 (1940) - Cop (uncredited)
- Arizona (1940) - Teamster (uncredited)
- The Lone Wolf Keeps a Date (1940) - Croupier With Check (uncredited)
- The Phantom Submarine (1940) - Cab Driver (uncredited)
- This Thing Called Love (1940) - Ship officer (uncredited)
- Boobs in Arms (1940, Short) - Sergeant Hugh Dare
- The Devil Commands (1941) - Dr. Richard Sayles
- Across the Sierras (1941) - Larry Armstrong
- Meet Boston Blackie (1941) - Police Officer (uncredited)
- Outlaws of the Panhandle (1941) - Henchman Britt
- North from the Lone Star (1941) - Clint Wilson
- They Dare Not Love (1941) - Third Photographer (uncredited)
- All the World's a Stooge (1941, Short) - Dr. I. Yankum (uncredited)
- Time Out for Rhythm (1941) - Customer (uncredited)
- Blondie in Society (1941) - Nelson, Dithers' Employee (uncredited)
- The Medico of Painted Springs (1941) - Kentucky Lane
- The Son of Davy Crockett (1941) - Jesse Gordon
- The Richest Man in Town (1941) - Son (uncredited)
- I Was a Prisoner on Devil's Island (1941) - Georges (uncredited)
- Texas (1941) - Red, Fight Timekeeper (uncredited)
- The Officer and the Lady (1941) - Ace Quinn
- In the Sweet Pie and Pie (1941, Short) - Diggins (uncredited)
- Go West, Young Lady (1941) - Gang Member (uncredited)
- The Lone Wolf Takes a Chance (1941) - Brakeman (uncredited)
- Valley of the Sun (1942) - Lieutenant Burke (uncredited)
- Perils of the Royal Mounted (1942, Serial) - Constable Brady
- The Major and the Minor (1942) - Will Duffy (final film role)
- Dizzy Pilots (1943, Short) - Sergeant (in footage from Boobs in Arms)
