= The Crime Patrol =

- Directed by: Eugene Cummings
- Written by: Betty Burbridge (continuity and dialogue); Arthur T. Horman (story)
- Produced by: Harry Knight
- Starring: See below
- Cinematography: Bert Longenecker
- Edited by: Earl Neville
- Release date: May 13, 1936
- Running time: 59 minutes
- Country: United States
- Language: English

The Crime Patrol is a 1936 American film directed by Eugene Cummings.

== Plot ==
Boxer Bob Neal joins the police after losing a fight against Officer Davis. Together they arrest Neal's former friends who stole a truck.

== Cast ==
- Ray Walker as Bob Neal
- Geneva Mitchell as Nurse Mary Prentiss
- Herbert Corthell as Police Commissioner Joe Collins
- Hooper Atchley as Dr. Simmons
- Wilbur Mack as Vic Santell
- Russ Clark as Officer Davis
- Max Wagner as Henchman Bennie
- Virginia True Boardman as Mrs. Kate Neal
- Hal Taliaferro as Henchman Driving Getaway Car
- 'Snub' Pollard as Gyp Hoyle
- Henry Roquemore as Fight Promoter
- Robert McKenzie as Mr. Stevens, store owner
