= Flight to Fame =

1938 American action film directed by Charles C. Coleman

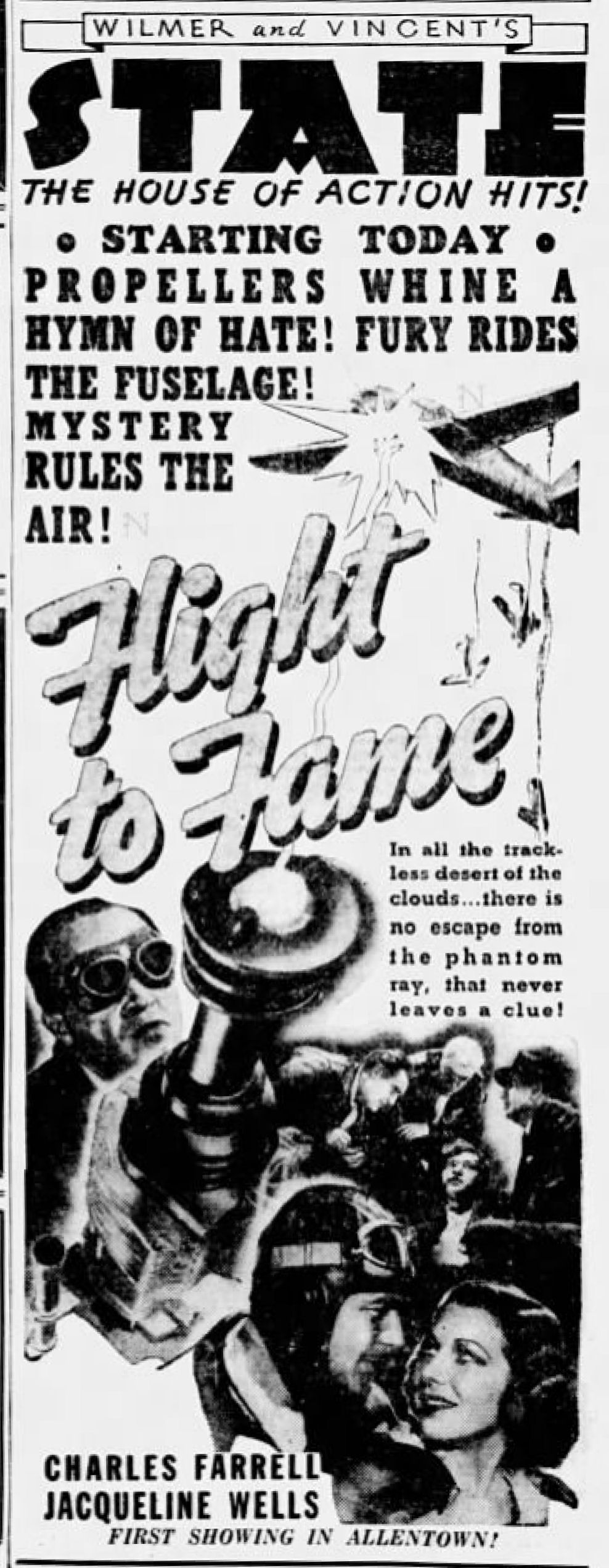
- Newspaper advertisement
- Directed by: Charles C. Coleman
- Screenplay by: Michael L. Simmons
- Starring: Charles Farrell; Julie Bishop; Hugh Sothern
- Cinematography: Lucien Ballard
- Edited by: James Sweeney
- Music by: Sidney Cutner
- Distributed by: Columbia Pictures
- Release date: October 12, 1938
- Running time: 67 minutes
- Country: United States
- Language: English

Flight to Fame is a 1938 American action film directed by Charles C. Coleman. It stars Charles Farrell, Julie Bishop, and Hugh Sothern.

== Cast ==
- Charles Farrell as Capt. Robert Lawrence
- Julie Bishop as Barbara Fiske (credited as Jacqueline Wells)
- Hugh Sothern as Dr. Harlan Fiske
- Alexander D'Arcy as Perez
- Jason Robards Sr. as Muller (credited as Jason Robards)
- Charles D. Brown as Maj. Loy
- Addison Richards as Col. King
- Frederick Burton as Gen. Darrow
- Selmer Jackson as Jules Peabody
- Reed Howes as Roy Curran
- Dutch Hendrian as Sound Sergeant (uncredited)
- Eddie Kane as Officer (uncredited)
- Malcolm 'Bud' McTaggart as Page Boy (uncredited)
- James Millican as Pilot (uncredited)
- Lee Prather as Officer (uncredited)
- Edwin Stanley as Minor Role (uncredited)
- Vernon Steele as Officer (uncredited)
