= Assassin of Youth =

1937 film by Elmer Clifton

- Poster
- Directed by: Elmer Clifton
- Written by: Charles A. Browne; Elmer Clifton
- Produced by: Charles A. Browne; Leo J. McCarthy
- Starring: Luana Walters; Arthur Gardner; Fay McKenzie; Michael Owen; Dorothy Short
- Edited by: Rose Loewinger
- Distributed by: BCM Roadshow Productions
- Release date: 1937
- Running time: 80 minutes
- Language: English

Assassin of Youth is a 1937 exploitation film directed by Elmer Clifton. It is a pre-WWII film about the supposed ill effects of cannabis. The film is often considered a clone of the much more famous Reefer Madness (sharing cast member Dorothy Short). The thriller reflects the antidrug propaganda of its time.

== Synopsis ==
The journalist Art Brighton goes undercover to investigate the granddaughter of a recently deceased rich woman, killed in a drug-related car crash. The girl, Joan Barrie, will inherit the fortune of her grandmother if she is able to fulfill a morals clause in the will. Joan's cousin Linda Clayton and her husband Jack will try to frame Joan to acquire the fortune themselves.

The journalist tries to save Joan and dismantle the criminal gang of marijuana-dealing youths to which Linda belongs. While the newspaper tries to show the horrible dangers of marijuana to the general public, violence scales in the town in the form of obscene all-night drug parties where anything can happen.

A key concluding scene in a courtroom involves the prosecution of Joan. Just as the judge is about to pass sentence, the journalist Art Brighton rushes in with evidence exposing Linda's involvement in the drug distribution. The film ends announcing Joan's engagement to Art.

== Reference to article by Harry J. Anslinger ==
The film's title refers to an article of the same year by U.S. "drug czar" Harry J. Anslinger that appeared in The American Magazine and was reprinted in Reader's Digest in 1938. That article briefly mentions several stories from his "Gore file" of tragedies allegedly caused by marijuana. The movie's tone echoes those of Anslinger's cautionary tales.

== Cast ==
- Luana Walters as Joan Barry
- Arthur Gardner as Art Brighton
- Dorothy Short as Marjorie 'Marge' Barry
- Earl Dwire as Henry 'Pop' Brady
- Fern Emmett as Henrietta Frisbee
- Henry Roquemore as Judge George Herbert
- Fay McKenzie as Linda Clayton
- Michael Owen as Jack Howard

== See also ==
- List of films in the public domain in the United States
