= Konga, the Wild Stallion =

- Theatrical release poster
- Directed by: Sam Nelson
- Screenplay by: Harold Shumate
- Story by: Harold Shumate
- Produced by: Wallace MacDonald
- Starring: Fred Stone; Rochelle Hudson; Richard Fiske
- Cinematography: Benjamin H. Kline
- Edited by: Charles Nelson
- Color process: Black and white
- Production company: Columbia Pictures
- Distributed by: Columbia Pictures
- Release date: August 30, 1939
- Running time: 65 minutes
- Country: United States
- Language: English

Konga, the Wild Stallion is a 1939 American Western film directed by Sam Nelson and starring Fred Stone, Rochelle Hudson and Richard Fiske.

== Plot ==
A battle has to be fought between rancher Yance Calhoun and farmer Jordan Hadley protecting precious meadows. The fight begins when the rancher's horses constantly break through the farmer's fence and destroy his wheat fields. The angry farmer starts shooting at the ranch owner's horses, including the beloved wild stallion, Konga. In return, the rancher shoots the farmer to get revenge. The feud is eventually settled when the rancher's son Steve and the farmer's daughter Judith fall in love.

== Cast ==
- Fred Stone as Yance Calhoun
- Rochelle Hudson as Judith Hadley
- Richard Fiske as Steve Calhoun
- Eddy Waller as Gloomy
- Robert Warwick as Jordan Hadley
- Don Beddoe as Fred Martin
- Carl Stockdale as Mason
- George Cleveland as Tabor
- Burr Caruth as Breckenridge

== See also ==
- List of American films of 1939
