= Frontier Crusader =

1940 film

- Directed by: Sam Newfield
- Written by: George Arthur Durlam; William Lively
- Produced by: Sigmund Neufeld
- Starring: Tim McCoy; Dorothy Short; Lou Fulton
- Cinematography: Jack Greenhalgh
- Edited by: Holbrook N. Todd
- Music by: Johnny Lange; Lew Porter
- Production company: Sigmund Neufeld Productions
- Distributed by: Producers Releasing Corporation
- Release date: June 15, 1940
- Running time: 62 minutes
- Country: United States
- Language: English

Frontier Crusader is a 1940 American Western film directed by Sam Newfield and starring Tim McCoy, Dorothy Short and Lou Fulton.

== Cast ==
- Tim McCoy as Trigger Tim Rand
- Dorothy Short as Jenny Mason
- Lou Fulton as 'Lanky' Lint
- Karl Hackett as Barney Bronson
- Ted Adams as Henchman Jack Trask
- John Merton as Henchman Hippo Potts
- Forrest Taylor as John Stoner
- Hal Price as Sheriff Sam Dolan
- Frank LaRue as Jeff Martin aka Lon Martin
- Kenne Duncan as The Mesa Kid
- George Chesebro as Trail Boss

== Bibliography ==
- Darby, William. Masters of Lens and Light: A Checklist of Major Cinematographers and Their Feature Films. Scarecrow Press, 1991.
