= Herbert Corthell =

American actor (1878–1947)

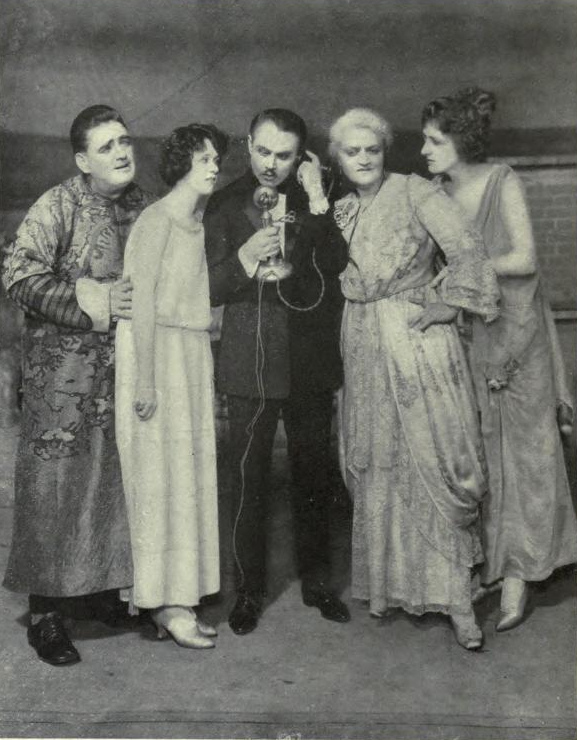
- Corthell (left) with Edna Hibbard, Charlie Ruggles, Zelda Sears and Virginia Hammond in Tumble In, 1919
- Born: Joseph Bertram Corthell; January 20, 1878; Boston, Massachusetts, U.S.
- Died: January 23, 1947 (aged 69); Hollywood, California, U.S.

Herbert Corthell (born Joseph Bertram Corthell, January 20, 1878 – January 23, 1947) was an American stage and film actor. He was born in Boston, Massachusetts, and died in Hollywood, California.

== Filmography ==
| Year | Title | Role | Notes |
|---|---|---|---|
| 1924 | Second Youth | George Whiggam | |
| 1924 | Classmates | Drummer | |
| 1933 | The Cohens and Kellys in Trouble | Panhandler | Uncredited |
| 1933 | Saturday's Millions | Baldy | |
| 1933 | Only Yesterday | Preston | Uncredited |
| 1933 | Lone Cowboy | Cowboy Cook | Uncredited |
| 1934 | Bombay Mail | Edward J. Breeze | |
| 1934 | Uncertain Lady | Harley, the Butler | |
| 1934 | Let's Talk It Over | Butler | |
| 1935 | The Fire Trap | Commodore Brunton | |
| 1936 | Dancing Feet | Jenkins | |
| 1936 | The Story of Louis Pasteur | Louis Adolphe Thiers, First President, Republic of France | |
| 1936 | The Crime Patrol | Police Commissioner | |
| 1936 | The Luckiest Girl in the World | Bartender | |
| 1937 | Espionage | Police Judge | Uncredited |
| 1937 | The Man Who Found Himself | Train Conductor | Uncredited |
| 1937 | The Man in Blue | Patrolman Pat Casey | |
| 1937 | Blazing Barriers | Sheriff Martin | |
| 1937 | Renfrew of the Royal Mounted | James Bronson | |
| 1938 | Sing, You Sinners | Night Club Manager | |
| 1939 | Rollin' Westward | Tug Lawson | |
| 1939 | The House of Fear | Minor Role | Uncredited |
| 1939 | Career | | Uncredited |
| 1939 | 5th Ave Girl | Joe - Board Member | Uncredited |
| 1940 | Hidden Enemy | Pete | |
| 1940 | Danger on Wheels | Pop O'Shea | |
| 1940 | Primrose Path | Herb - Man Getting Gas | Uncredited |
| 1941 | Citizen Kane | City Editor | Uncredited |
| 1942 | Duke of the Navy | 'General' Courtney | |
| 1943 | Sleepy Lagoon | Sheriff Lem Bates | |
| 1944 | Lady in the Dark | Senator | Uncredited |
| 1944 | Knickerbocker Holiday | Captain | Uncredited, (final film role) |
