= Stephen Chase (actor) =

American actor (1902–1982)

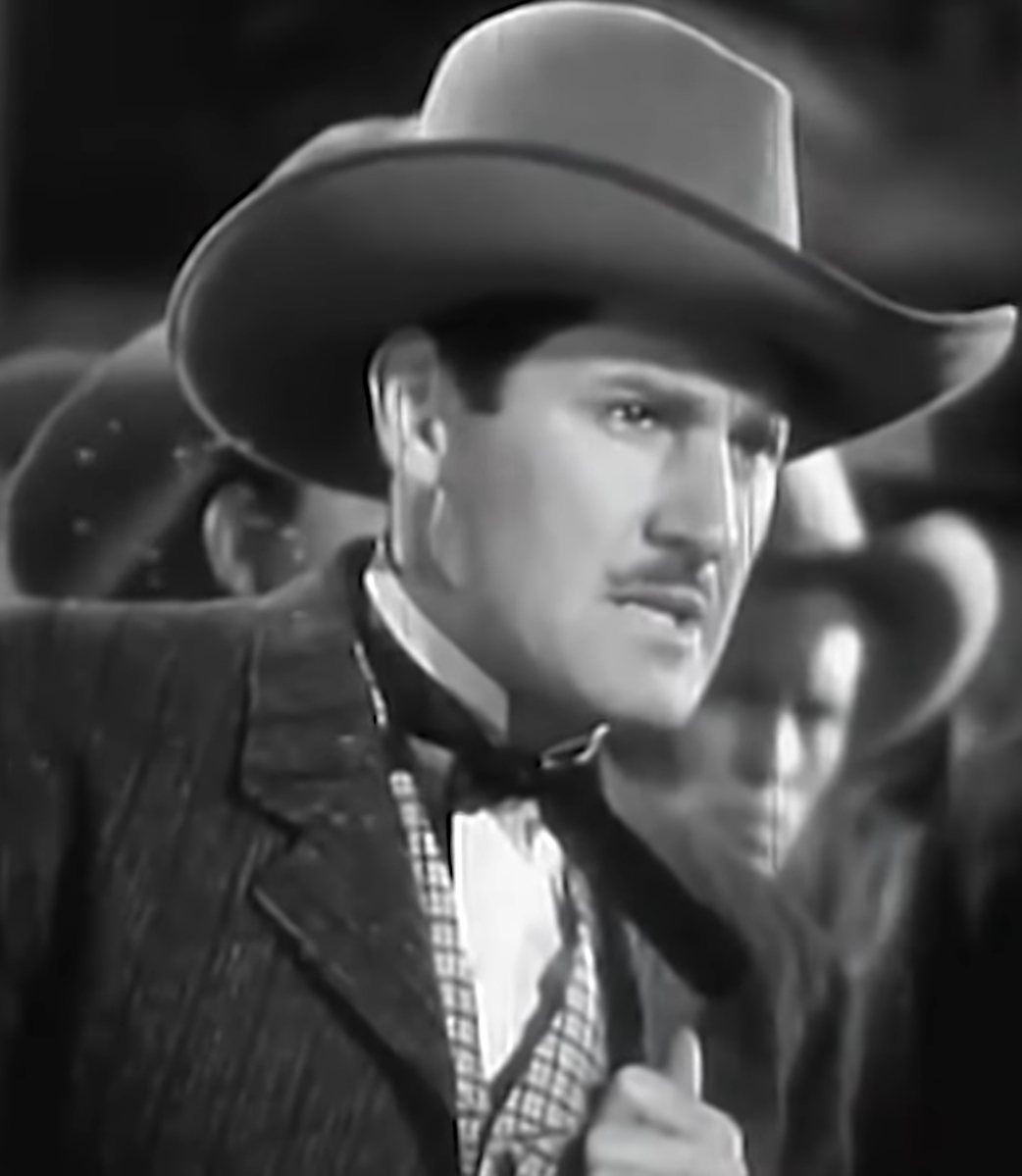
- Chase in Rogue of the Range (1936)
- Born: Guy Alden Chase; April 11, 1902; Huntington, New York, U.S.
- Died: April 1, 1982 (aged 79); Santa Monica, California, U.S.
- Other name: Alden Chase
- Occupation: Actor
- Years active: 1933–1970

Guy Alden Chase (April 11, 1902 – April 1, 1982) was an American film and television actor.

== Life and career ==
Chase was born in Huntington, New York. He began his career in 1933, as appearing in the film Chance at Heaven, where Chase played the uncredited role of "Betty's Escort". He continued his career, in which Chase was mainly credited as the stage name Alden Chase. He used the stage name for films such as The Little Colonel, Riders of Black Mountain, Paper Bullets, The Lone Rider in Ghost Town, The Cowboy Millionaire, Billy the Kid's Range War, Rogue of the Range, Code of the Cactus, Heart of Arizona and The Prescott Kid.

Later in his career, Chase then used the stage name Stephen Chase, beginning from 1949. He appeared on six episodes of the American western television series The Lone Ranger. In 1953, Chase toured on the stage play, titled, The Caine Mutiny Court-Martial, in which was presented by producer, Paul Gregory. He co-starred and appeared on films such as The Great Sioux Uprising, The Buccaneer, The Blob, The Caddy, El Paso Stampede and Old Oklahoma Plains. Chase also guest-starred on television programs including Death Valley Days, Perry Mason, The Rifleman, Alfred Hitchcock Presents, Bonanza, Tales of Wells Fargo, 77 Sunset Strip, The Phil Silvers Show and Gunsmoke.

Chase retired his career in 1970, as last credit was from the television serial The Roads to Freedom, in the episode "The Defeated: Part 2".

== Death ==
Chase died in April 1982 in Santa Monica, California, at the age of 80.

== Selected filmography ==
- Hotel (1967) as Tom (uncredited)
- The Glory Guys (1965) as Gen. Hoffman
- Bachelor Flat (1961) as District Attorney (uncredited)
- I Mobster (1959) as Mr. Stephens (uncredited)
- The Buccaneer (1958) as Col. Butler
- The Blob (1958) as Dr. T. Hallen (as Steven Chase)
- Appointment with a Shadow (1957) as Sam Carewe
- Rails Into Laramie (1954) as Gen. Augur (as Steve Chase)
- Tropic Zone (1953) as Captain (uncredited)
- The Lawless Breed (1952) as Judge (uncredited)
- No Room for the Groom (1952) as Mr. Taylor
- Frisco Tornado (1950) as Jim Crail
- Flight from Destiny (1941) as Walter Sender
- Every Night at Eight (1935) as Mr. Graham (uncredited)

== Selected television appearances ==
- Alfred Hitchcock Presents (1960) (Season 6 Episode 1: "Mrs. Bixby and the Colonel's Coat") as Colonel
