= It Couldn't Have Happened – But It Did =

1936 film by Phil Rosen

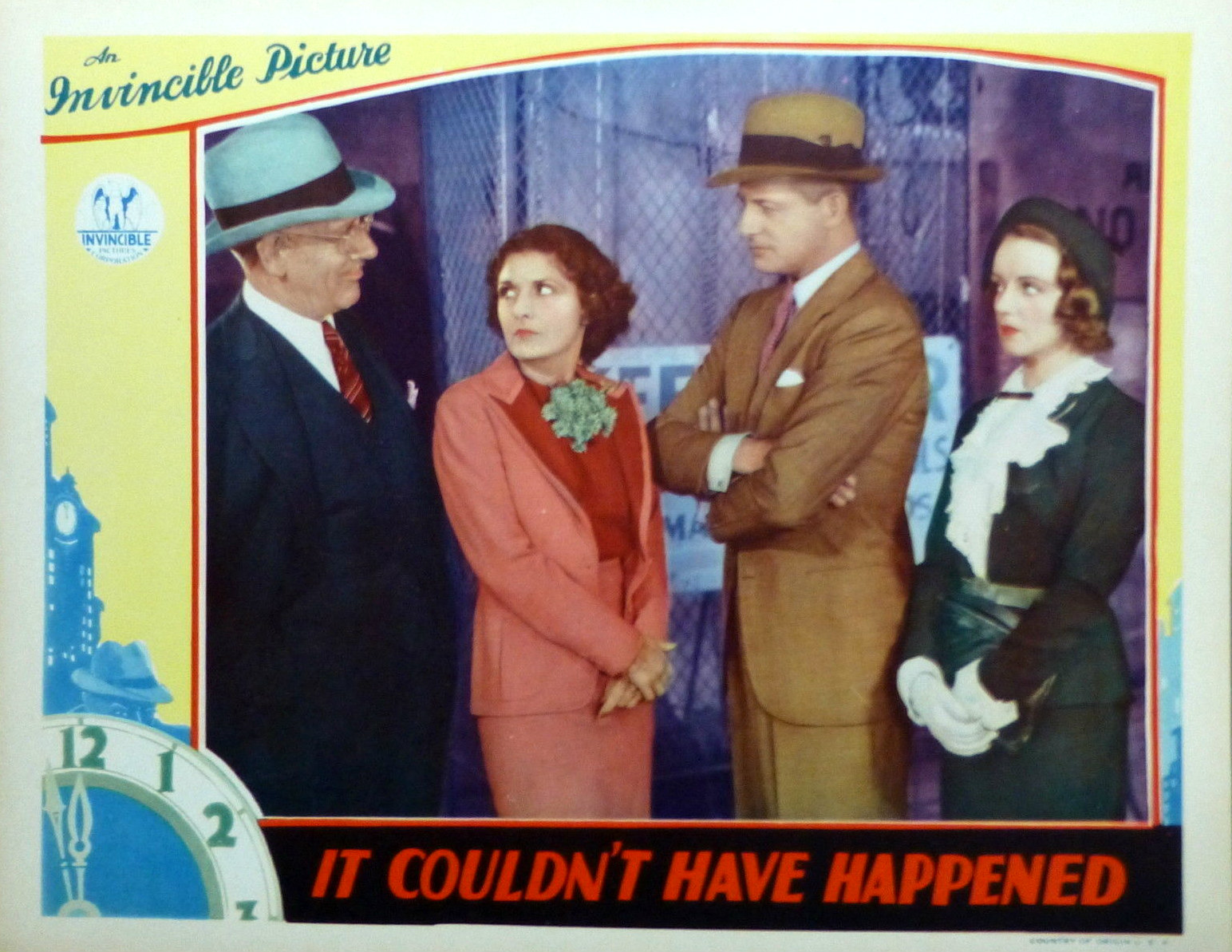
- Lobby card
- Directed by: Phil Rosen
- Written by: Arthur T. Horman (original story and screenplay)
- Produced by: Maury M. Cohen (producer)
- Starring: See below
- Cinematography: M.A. Anderson
- Edited by: Roland D. Reed
- Production company: Invincible Pictures Corp.
- Distributed by: Chesterfield Pictures
- Release date: 1936
- Running time: 70 minutes
- Country: United States
- Language: English

It Couldn't Have Happened – But It Did is a 1936 American romantic crime film directed by Phil Rosen. The film is also known as It Couldn't Have Happened (American review title).

== Plot ==
Theatrical writer Greg Stone is rehearsing with his troupe. There are some secrets between the actors and some problems with contracts to be signed with the producers. Then two murders are committed. Stone is forced to investigate.

== Cast ==
- Reginald Denny as Greg Stone
- Evelyn Brent as Beverly Drake
- Jack La Rue as Smiley Clark
- Inez Courtney as Linda Sands
- Hugh Marlowe (billed as John Marlowe) as Edward Forrest
- Claude King as Ellis Holden
- Bryant Washburn as Norman Carter
- Robert Homans as Police Lt. O'Neill
- Crauford Kent as Bob Bennett
- Robert Frazer as Lloyd Schaefer – Stage Manager
- Miki Morita as Hashi – Houseboy
- Emily LaRue as Ingenue

== Critical reception ==
Variety offered a negative review that said the director Phil Rosen’s work was far below his previous standard, and that "more than half of the initial story consists of words, more words and still more words, dumb entrances and exits." The review concluded with the statement : "The biggest mystery about this film is how it could have been done so poorly." The review commented on the actors and stated, "Inez Courtney shines despite phoney lines, phoney situations and stupid story development … La Rue, as the gangster, is so real he almost makes the character a loveable one … Evelyn Brent does as well as could be expected of a colorless character … John Marlowe … turns in a slipshod, actorish job."

Lionel Collier, writing for the British magazine, Picturegoer, found the plot to be "completely incredible" but commented that "bright comedy moments and a certain amount of suspense make it fairly entertaining." He offered positive comments for the acting, and wrote, "Reginald Denny is good as the playwright as are Evelyn Brent and Jack la Rue who support him, but none of them can make the action at all convincing."
