= Highway Patrol (film) =

1938 film by Charles C. Coleman

- Directed by: Charles C. Coleman
- Starring: Robert Paige; Julie Bishop; Robert Middlemass
- Cinematography: Lucien Ballard
- Edited by: Richard W. Farrell; James Sweeney
- Distributed by: Columbia Pictures
- Release date: June 27, 1938
- Running time: 56 minutes
- Country: United States
- Language: English

Highway Patrol is a 1938 American action film, directed by Charles C. Coleman. It stars Robert Paige, Julie Bishop, and Robert Middlemass.
