= They Asked for It =

Film directed by Frank McDonald

- Theatrical release poster
- Directed by: Frank McDonald
- Screenplay by: Arthur T. Horman
- Story by: James B. Lowell
- Produced by: Max Golden
- Starring: William Lundigan; Joy Hodges; Michael Whalen; Isabel Jewell; Lyle Talbot; Thomas Beck; Spencer Charters
- Cinematography: Stanley Cortez
- Edited by: Philip Cahn
- Production company: Universal Pictures
- Distributed by: Universal Pictures
- Release date: May 20, 1939
- Running time: 61 minutes
- Country: United States
- Language: English

They Asked for It is a 1939 American crime film directed by Frank McDonald and written by Arthur T. Horman. The film stars William Lundigan, Joy Hodges, Michael Whalen, Isabel Jewell, Lyle Talbot, Thomas Beck and Spencer Charters. The film was released on May 20, 1939, by Universal Pictures.

== Cast ==
- William Lundigan as Steve Lewis
- Joy Hodges as Mary Lou Carroll
- Michael Whalen as Howard Adams
- Isabel Jewell as Molly Herkimer
- Lyle Talbot as Marty Collins
- Thomas Beck as Dr. Peter Sparks
- Spencer Charters as Chief Lawson
- James Bush as Tucker Tyler
- Charles Halton as Dr. Tyler
- Edward McWade as 'Pi' Kelly
