= Missing Daughters (1939 film) =

1939 film by Charles C. Coleman

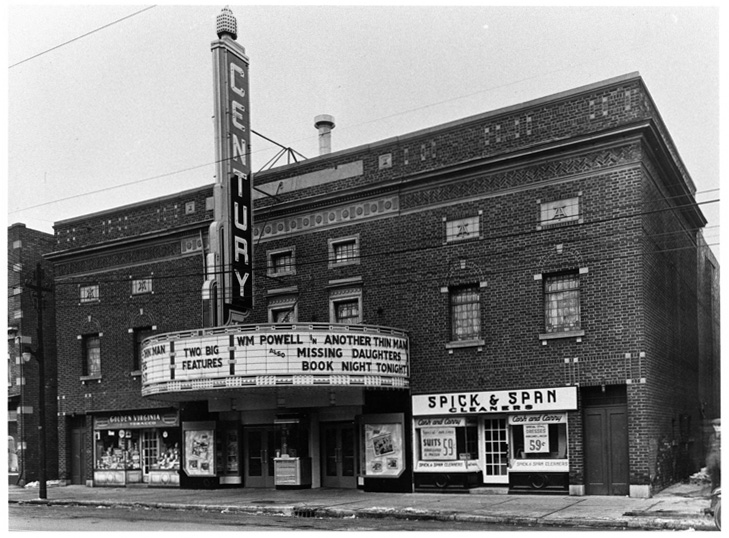
- Theater in Toronto showing the film
- Directed by: Charles C. Coleman (as C.C. Coleman Jr.)
- Written by: Michael L. Simmons; George Bricker
- Starring: Richard Arlen; Rochelle Hudson; Marian Marsh
- Cinematography: Henry Freulich
- Edited by: Gene Havlick
- Production company: Columbia Pictures
- Distributed by: Columbia Pictures
- Release date: May 22, 1939
- Running time: 59 minutes
- Country: United States
- Language: English

Missing Daughters is a 1939 American crime film directed by Charles C. Coleman. It stars Richard Arlen, Rochelle Hudson, and Marian Marsh.

== Plot ==
Kay Roberts comes to see radio crime commentator Wally King after the death of Josie, her sister. Josie left home to become a nightclub hostess, only to fall victim to a series of murders covering up a slavery racket.

Wally goes undercover to investigate with the police department's consent after disparaging their work on his radio program. Kay also takes a job as a cigarette girl, hoping to help Wally with his work. The nightclub's owner figures out what Wally is up to and is about to kill him when Capt. McGraw of the police intervenes, just in time.

== Cast ==
- Richard Arlen as Wally
- Rochelle Hudson as Kay
- Marian Marsh as Josie Lamonte
- Isabel Jewell as Peggy
- Edward Raquello as Lucky Rogers
- Dick Wessel as Brick McGirk
- Eddie Kane as Nick
- Wade Boteler as Capt. McGraw
- Don Beddoe as Al Farrow
- Claire Rochelle as Doris
- Byron Foulger as Bert Ford
- John Harmon as Tim
- Allen Vincent as Slinky
- Walter Sande as Snoop
- Esther Howard as Mother Hawks
- Cy Schindell as Mugg
- Lucile Browne as Estelle
- Lorna Gray as Nan
- Dorothy Short as Bee
- Christine McIntyre as Ruth
- Mary Ainslee as Showgirl
- Dorothy Fay as Showgirl
- Mildred Shay as Hostess
- James Craig as 1st Attendant
- Richard Fiske as 2nd Attendant
- Rosina Galli as Italian
