= Down Rio Grande Way =

1942 film by William Berke

- Theatrical release poster
- Directed by: William Berke
- Screenplay by: Paul Franklin
- Produced by: Jack Fier
- Starring: Charles Starrett; Russell Hayden; Britt Wood; Rose Anne Stevens; Norman Willis; Davison Clark
- Cinematography: George Meehan
- Edited by: Mel Thorsen
- Production company: Columbia Pictures
- Distributed by: Columbia Pictures
- Release date: April 23, 1942
- Running time: 57 minutes
- Country: United States
- Language: English

Down Rio Grande Way is a 1942 American Western film directed by William Berke and written by Paul Franklin. The film stars Charles Starrett, Russell Hayden, Britt Wood, Rose Anne Stevens, Norman Willis and Davison Clark. The film was released on April 23, 1942, by Columbia Pictures.

The copyright for the film Down Rio Grande Way was renewed in 1970.

== Plot ==
Congress is about to decide if Texas will become a state. The Colonel and the Judge want to keep Texas independent and have Vandall and his gang causing unrest among the ranchers. The Rangers send Steve Martin. He finds the ranchers want to go after Vandall but Steve realizes Vandall must have a boss and that's the man he wants.

== Cast ==
- Charles Starrett as Steve Martin
- Russell Hayden as 'Lucky' Haines
- Britt Wood as Britt Haines
- Rose Anne Stevens as Mary Ann Baldridge
- Norman Willis as Keno Jack Vandall
- Davison Clark as Colonel Elihu Baldridge
- Edmund Cobb as Stoner
- Budd Buster as Clem Kearney
- Joseph Eggenton as Judge Randolph Henderson
- Paul Newlan as Sam Houston
- Betty Roadman as Annie Haines
