= Heart of Arizona =

1938 film by Lesley Selander

- Theatrical release poster
- Directed by: Lesley Selander
- Screenplay by: Norman Houston
- Based on: The Heart of Arizona novel by Clarence E. Mulford
- Produced by: Harry Sherman
- Starring: William Boyd; George "Gabby" Hayes; Russell Hayden; John Elliott; Billy King; Natalie Moorhead; Dorothy Short
- Cinematography: Russell Harlan
- Edited by: Sherman A. Rose
- Production company: Paramount Pictures
- Distributed by: Paramount Pictures
- Release date: April 22, 1938
- Running time: 68 minutes
- Country: United States
- Language: English

Heart of Arizona is a 1938 American Western film directed by Lesley Selander and written by Norman Houston. The film stars William Boyd, George "Gabby" Hayes, Russell Hayden, John Elliott, Billy King, Natalie Moorhead and Dorothy Short. The film was released on April 22, 1938, by Paramount Pictures.

== Plot ==
Belle is being released after serving a five-year prison sentence for standing by her outlaw husband, Sam. The sheriff wants to drop her off in a Nogales dancehall, but Hoppy forces him to let her go back to her ranch.

== Cast ==
- William Boyd as Hopalong Cassidy
- George "Gabby" Hayes as Windy Halliday
- Russell Hayden as Lucky Jenkins
- John Elliott as Buck Peters
- Billy King as Artie
- Natalie Moorhead as Belle Starr
- Dorothy Short as Jackie Starr
- Stephen Chase as Dan Ringo
- John Beach as Sheriff Hawley
- Lane Chandler as Trimmer Winkler
- Leo J. McMahon as Twister
