= My Son Is a Criminal =

1939 film by Charles C. Coleman (as C.C. Coleman Jr.)

- Directed by: Charles C. Coleman (as C.C. Coleman Jr.)
- Screenplay by: Arthur T. Horman
- Produced by: Wallace MacDonald
- Starring: Alan Baxter; Julie Bishop; Gordon Oliver; Willard Robertson
- Cinematography: Allen G. Siegler
- Edited by: Gene Havlick
- Color process: Black and white
- Production company: Columbia Pictures
- Distributed by: Columbia Pictures
- Release date: February 22, 1939
- Running time: 60 minutes
- Country: United States
- Language: English

My Son Is a Criminal is a 1939 American crime film directed by Charles C. Coleman (as C.C. Coleman Jr.) and starring Alan Baxter, Julie Bishop, Gordon Oliver and Willard Robertson.

== Plot ==
Former police chief Tim Halloran Sr. (Willard Robertson) fully expects his Tim Jr. (Alan Baxter) to follow in his footsteps, flat though they may be. Instead, the younger Halloran opts for the easy road of crime

== Cast ==
- Alan Baxter as Tim Halloran Jr.
- Julie Bishop as Myrna Kingsley (as Jacqueline Wells)
- Gordon Oliver as Allen Coltrin
- Willard Robertson as Tom Halloran Sr.
- Joe King as Jerry Kingsley (as Joseph King)
- Eddie Laughton as Walt Fraser
- John Tyrrell as Jersey

== See also ==
- List of American films of 1939
