= The Lone Star Vigilantes =

1942 film by Wallace Fox

- Theatrical release poster
- Directed by: Wallace Fox
- Screenplay by: Luci Ward
- Produced by: Leon Barsha
- Starring: Wild Bill Elliott; Tex Ritter; Frank Mitchell; Virginia Carpenter; Luana Walters; Budd Buster
- Cinematography: Benjamin H. Kline
- Edited by: Mel Thorsen
- Production company: Columbia Pictures
- Distributed by: Columbia Pictures
- Release date: January 1, 1942
- Running time: 58 minutes
- Country: United States
- Language: English

The Lone Star Vigilantes is a 1942 American Western film directed by Wallace Fox and written by Luci Ward. The film stars Wild Bill Elliott, Tex Ritter, Frank Mitchell, Virginia Carpenter, Luana Walters and Budd Buster. The film was released on January 1, 1942, by Columbia Pictures. It is the ninth in Columbia Pictures' series of 12 "Wild Bill Hickok" films, followed by Bullets for Bandits.

== Cast ==
- Wild Bill Elliott as Wild Bill Hickok
- Tex Ritter as Tex Martin
- Frank Mitchell as Cannonball
- Virginia Carpenter as Sherry Monroe
- Luana Walters as Marcia Banning
- Budd Buster as Colonel Sam Monroe
- Forrest Taylor as Dr. Mark Banning
- Gavin Gordon as Major Halland Clark
- Lowell Drew as Peabody
- Edmund Cobb as Sergeant Charley Cobb
- Ethan Laidlaw as Corporal Benson
- Rick Anderson as Lige Miller
