= Code of the Range =

1936 film by Charles C. Coleman

- Theatrical release poster
- Directed by: Charles C. Coleman
- Written by: Peter B. Kyne; Ford Beebe
- Produced by: Harry L. Decker
- Starring: Charles Starrett; Mary Blake; Edward Coxen
- Cinematography: George Meehan
- Edited by: William A. Lyon
- Music by: Morris Stoloff
- Production company: Columbia Pictures
- Distributed by: Columbia Pictures
- Release date: October 9, 1936
- Running time: 55 minutes
- Country: United States
- Language: English

Code of the Range is a 1936 American Western film directed by Charles C. Coleman and starring Charles Starrett, Mary Blake and Edward Coxen.

== Plot ==
A feud breaks out between cattle ranchers and sheepherders who dispute each other's grazing rights.

== Cast ==
- Charles Starrett as Lee Jamison
- Mary Blake as Janet Parker
- Edward Coxen as Angus McLeod
- Allan Cavan a s 'Calamity' Parker
- Albert J. Smith as Barney Ross
- Edward Peil Sr. as Sheriff
- Edmund Cobb as Ed Randall
- Edward LeSaint as Adams
- Ralph McCullough as Quigley
- George Chesebro as Henchman
- Art Mix as Henchman
