= Pony Post =

- Theatrical release poster
- Directed by: Ray Taylor
- Screenplay by: Sherman L. Lowe
- Story by: Sherman L. Lowe
- Produced by: Will Cowan
- Starring: Johnny Mack Brown; Fuzzy Knight; Nell O'Day; Dorothy Short; Tom Chatterton; Stanley Blystone
- Cinematography: Jerome Ash
- Edited by: Paul Landres
- Production company: Universal Pictures
- Distributed by: Universal Pictures
- Release date: December 1, 1940
- Running time: 59 minutes
- Country: United States
- Language: English

Pony Post is a 1940 American Western film directed by Ray Taylor and written by Sherman L. Lowe. The film stars Johnny Mack Brown, Fuzzy Knight, Nell O'Day, Dorothy Short, Tom Chatterton and Stanley Blystone. The film was released on December 1, 1940, by Universal Pictures.

== Cast ==
- Johnny Mack Brown as Cal Sheridan
- Fuzzy Knight as Shorty
- Nell O'Day as Norma Reeves
- Dorothy Short as Alice Goodwin
- Tom Chatterton as Maj. Goodwin
- Stanley Blystone as Griff Atkins
- Jack Rockwell as Mack Richards
- Ray Teal as Claud Richards
- Kermit Maynard as Whitmore
- Lane Chandler as Ed Fairweather
- Edmund Cobb as George Barber
- Lloyd Ingraham as Doctor Nesbet
- Charles King as Hamilton
