= North of the Yukon (1939 film) =

Film by Sam Nelson

- Directed by: Sam Nelson
- Screenplay by: Bennett Cohen
- Story by: Bennett Cohen
- Starring: Charles Starrett
- Cinematography: George Meehan
- Edited by: William A. Lyon
- Color process: Black and white
- Production company: Columbia Pictures
- Distributed by: Columbia Pictures
- Release date: March 30, 1939
- Running time: 64 minutes
- Country: United States
- Language: English

North of the Yukon is a 1939 American Western film directed by Sam Nelson and starring Charles Starrett.

== Plot ==
In this North western, a brave Canadian Mountie pursuing a gang of fur thieves finds himself drummed out of the RCMP and forced to run a gauntlet of Mountie whips. when the gang learns of this, they convince him to join them.

== Cast ==
- Charles Starrett as RCMP Sgt. Jim Cameron
- Dorothy Comingore as Jean Duncan (as Linda Winters)
- Bob Nolan as RCMP Const. Bob Cameron
- Sons of the Pioneers as Musicians
- Paul Sutton as Pierre Ledoux
- Richard Fiske as Mart Duncan
- Vernon Steele as RCMP Insp. Wylie
- Edmund Cobb as RCMP Cpl. Hawley
- Tom London as Carter
- Lane Chandler as Atkins
- Dick Botiller as Henchman Barton
- Kenne Duncan as Henchman Meeker (as Kenneth Duncan)
- Harry Cording as MacGregor

== Reception ==
The performances and plot of North of the Yukon received a positive review in Variety. Boxoffice called it "a fair to middling western."

== See also ==
- List of American films of 1939
