= Daughter of the Tong =

1939 film by Bernard B. Ray

- Directed by: Raymond K. Johnson
- Written by: George H. Plympton (story); Alan Merritt (continuity)
- Produced by: Lester F. Scott Jr.
- Starring: Evelyn Brent; Grant Withers; Dorothy Short
- Cinematography: Elmer Dyer
- Edited by: Charles Diltz
- Distributed by: Metropolitan Pictures
- Release date: August 28, 1939
- Running time: 56 minutes
- Country: United States
- Language: English

Daughter of the Tong is a 1939 crime film about a detective that goes against a female leader of an Asian crime ring.

== Plot ==
Ralph Dickson is an FBI agent assigned to investigate the killing of a colleague. He is chosen to investigate due to an uncanny likeness to the presumed killer. Dickson goes undercover and learns the identity of the gang leader, Carney, who is also known as "the Illustrious One" and the "Daughter of the Tong." Carney stays holed up at the Oriental Hotel while she has her henchmen doing her dirty work.

== Cast ==
- Evelyn Brent as Carney - The Illustrious One
- Grant Withers as Ralph Dickson
- Dorothy Short as Marion Morgan
- Dave O'Brien as Jerry Morgan
- Richard Loo as Wong, the hotel clerk
- Dirk Thane as Henchman Ward
- Harry Harvey as Harold 'Mugsy' Winthrop
- Budd Buster as 'Lefty' McMillan
- Robert Frazer as FBI Chief Williams
- Hal Taliaferro as FBI Agent Lawson

== Distributors ==
- Times Exchange (1939) (USA) (theatrical)
- Reel Media International (2004) (worldwide) (VHS)
- Alpha Video Distributors (June 28, 2005) (USA) (DVD)
- Mill Creek Entertainment (2007) (USA) (DVD)
- Reel Media International (2007) (non-USA) (all media)
