= Dizzy Pilots =

1943 film by Jules White

- Lobby card
- Directed by: Jules White
- Written by: Clyde Bruckman
- Produced by: Jules White
- Starring: Moe Howard; Larry Fine; Curly Howard; Richard Fiske; Harry Semels; Al Thompson
- Cinematography: Benjamin H. Kline
- Edited by: Charles Hochberg
- Distributed by: Columbia Pictures
- Release date: September 24, 1943 (U.S.)
- Running time: 16:53
- Country: United States
- Language: English

Dizzy Pilots is a 1943 short subject directed by Jules White starring American slapstick comedy team The Three Stooges (Moe Howard, Larry Fine and Curly Howard). It is the 74th entry in the series released by Columbia Pictures starring the comedians, who released 190 shorts for the studio between 1934 and 1959. (Note: This is the third and final Stooge short with the word "dizzy" in the title.)

== Plot ==
The Stooges are aviators ("the Wrong Brothers") in the Republic of Cannabeer, P.U., whose work is interrupted by an army draft notice (signed by one Joe Strubachincoscow). However, they have been deferred because of their plans for the new "Buzzard" aircraft. Their progress is stymied by a succession of mishaps.

Foremost among their problems is Moe being repeatedly immersed in quick-drying melted rubber. Curly and Larry's attempts to correct this involve hydrogen and a shotgun, culminating in Moe's aerial ascent and subsequent descent into a well. Then they try to maneuver the unwieldy aircraft out of its hangar, sending Moe skyward again and back into the liquid rubber.

They demonstrate the Buzzard to representatives of the Sky Aircraft Company, but are foiled by mechanical failures and errors. The Stooges lose control of the plane and fall into a well, drenching both themselves and the officials. This lands the Stooges in the army, where they tangle with a tough drill Sergeant. After a series of mishaps, they eventually manage to escape from military service.

== Cast ==
- Curly Howard as Curly Wrong (credited as Curly)
- Larry Fine as Larry Wrong (credited as Larry)
- Moe Howard as Moe Wrong (credited as Moe)
- Harry Semels as Sky Aircraft Co. Representative
- Al Thompson as Sky Aircraft Co. Representative

In footage from Boobs in Arms (1940):

- Richard Fiske as Sergeant
- Bobby Barber as Private
- Charles Dorety as Private

== Production notes ==
Dizzy Pilots was filmed April 6–9, 1943. The boot camp segment is stock footage from 1940's Boobs in Arms, with the exception of the ending shot where the Stooges escape from the base itself.

The gag of an aircraft being too large to take out of a hangar was reused in 1972 on The New Scooby-Doo Movies episode featuring the Stooges as guest stars ("The Ghost of the Red Baron").

Dizzy Pilots marks the final appearance of co-star Harry Semels.

== Reception ==
DVD Talk critic Stuart Galbraith IV noted that Dizzy Pilots was the "last genuinely excellent Curly short" with "a set-up similar to Higher Than a Kite though executed infinitely better."
