= The Stranger from Texas =

1939 film by Sam Nelson

- Theatrical poster for the film
- Directed by: Sam Nelson
- Screenplay by: Paul Franklin
- Story by: Ford Beebe
- Produced by: Harry L. Decker
- Starring: Charles Starrett; Lorna Gray; Sons of the Pioneers
- Cinematography: George Meehan
- Edited by: Mel Thorsen
- Music by: Bob Nolan; Tim Spencer
- Production company: Columbia Pictures
- Release date: November 2, 1939 (US)
- Running time: 54 minutes
- Country: United States
- Language: English

The Stranger from Texas is a 1939 American Western film directed by Sam Nelson and starring Charles Starrett, Lorna Gray and the Sons of the Pioneers.

== Plot ==
When his fences are cut, rancher Jeff Browning suspects his new neighbor, Dan Murdock, of the deed. Enmity builds between the two cattlemen, prompting Sheriff Fletcher to ask U.S. Marshal Ritchie for aid. By coincidence, the man whom Ritchie assigns to the case is Dan's son Tom. To prevent complications, Tom arrives in Buffalo Springs in the guise of Tom Morgan, a prospective buyer of Jeff's cattle. The news of an impending sale surprises Bat Stringer, Browning's foreman, who is secretly in league with Murdock's foreman, Carver, to round up the cattle belonging to their employers, change the brands and load them into a distant siding. Discovering that the brand from both ranches has been changed to Bar X, which is registered to Browning's son Ned, Murdock invites Jeff to his ranch to tell him the news. Before he can complete his story, however, Murdock is murdered and Jeff felled by a revolver blow. To protect Ned, Jeff allows the sheriff to arrest him for Murdock's murder, even though Jeff's gun is missing. Soon afterward, Tom sees Bat with the missing gun and informs Ned and his sister Jean of his discovery. When evidence of the Bar X brand is discovered, Ned is arrested, but Tom is sure that Bat is behind the rustling. Tom and the sheriff devise a plan to raise a posse to trap Bat and Carver, but the rustlers learn of the scheme by torturing Clay Billings, the railroad agent. After taking Ned and Jeff hostage, the rustlers ride toward the border with their stolen cattle. Meanwhile, Billings, tied hand and foot, wriggles free from his bonds and rides for the sheriff. Tom and the sheriff then ride to arrest Bat and Carver, while the posse rescues Ned and Jeff.

== Cast ==
- Charles Starrett as Tom Murdock/Tom Morgan
- Lorna Gray as Jean Browning
- Richard Fiske as Ned Browning
- Dick Curtis as Bat Stringer
- Edmund Cobb as Carver
- Bob Nolan as Bob
- Al Bridge as Jeff Browning
- Jack Rockwell as Sheriff Fletcher
- Hal Taliaferro as Clay Billings
- Edward Le Saint as Dan Murdock
- Sons of the Pioneers
