= Bullets for Bandits =

1942 film by Wallace W. Fox

- Film poster
- Directed by: Wallace W. Fox
- Written by: Robert Lee Johnson
- Produced by: Leon Barsha
- Starring: Wild Bill Elliott; Tex Ritter; Frank Mitchell
- Cinematography: George Meehan
- Edited by: Mel Thorsen
- Production company: Columbia Pictures
- Distributed by: Columbia Pictures
- Release date: February 12, 1942
- Running time: 55 minutes
- Country: United States
- Language: English

Bullets for Bandits is a 1942 American Western film directed by Wallace W. Fox, starring Wild Bill Elliott, Tex Ritter, and Frank Mitchell. It is the tenth in Columbia Pictures' series of 12 "Wild Bill Hickok" films, followed by The Devil's Trail.

== Plot ==
Queen Katey is the owner of a large ranch. There is the beginning of a movement among the local homesteaders to drive Katey out, so that her land can be divided. Queen has a long-lost son, Prince, who she sends one of her ranch hands, Cannonball, to find. Cannonball arrives at the office of the Badlands County sheriff, Tex Martin. Cannonball explains to Tex that Prince has the letters "KT" on his forearm, where they had been branded when he was a youth by a man named Clem Jeter. Tex thinks he's seen that brand, and directs Cannonball to the saloon.

While Cannonball is still on his way, Wild Bill Hickok is at the bar in the saloon. He observes a man who he could be the double for, playing cards. As he watches, he sees his double cheating, eventually taking all of another gambler's money. The double is Prince Katey. When Hickok confronts Prince and demands he return the other gambler's money, Prince draws on Hickok, but Hickok is faster and guns down Prince.

Right after the gunfight, Cannonball enters the saloon and mistakes Hickok for Prince. He hustles Hickok out of the saloon, afraid that he might be charged with murder. As the two men ride off, Tex arrives at the bar and checks the body of the dead man. In so doing he discerns that Prince had been shot twice, once by Hickok, and another shot which entered his back. Tex realizes that it was the shot in the back which actually killed Prince.

As they ride off, Cannonball lets Hickok know that he thinks he is Prince, and that Prince's mother needs his help in holding off a land grab by Jeter. Jeter is instigating the homesteaders in an attempt to run Queen Katey off her land. Understanding Queen's predicament, he agrees to accompany Cannonball to the ranch, playing along with the mistaken identity. They arrive at the ranch, where Queen accepts Hickok as her prodigal son.

As they head to the Katey ranch, Beetle, the man who shot Prince in the back, arrives at Jeter's cabin, where he informs him of the demise of the Katey heir. With what he feels his final roadblock taken care of, Jeter rides off and gets a court order appointing him as Queen's guardian. However, when he arrives at the Katey ranch to serve the order, he is dumbfounded to find Prince (he assumes) alive and well. When Jeter demands that Hickok prove he is Prince, the two men fight, and Jeter is thrown off the ranch. Jeter confronts Beetle, who is adamant that Prince is dead, so this man must be an imposter.

Meanwhile, Tex has set off after Cannonball and Hickok. He comes upon the burnt out ranch of the Brown's, Dakota and her father Bert. They tell him that it was Queen who burned down their house, in an attempt to drive them out of the county. As he is having dinner with the Browns, Jeter arrives and tells Tex that the man who killed Prince is posing as him at the Katey ranch.

At the ranch, Queen realizes that Hickok is not Prince, and tells him that it has been Jeter who has been terrorizing the local homesteaders, including the arson at the Brown ranch, and blaming his actions on Queen. Hickok pledges to help Queen withstand Jeter's plan. When Tex arrives, he asks Hickok to turn himself in, which Hickok agrees to do, just later at the Brown's ranch.

When Tex arrives at the Brown's ranch, someone takes a shot at him, which misses. He takes off after his assailant, but in doing so runs into Hickok. Initially he thinks it was Hickok who fired the shot, but when he sees that Hickok is free of soot, which would have been present if he had been hiding at the Brown's ranch to waylay him, he realizes that it wasn't Hickok. The two take off trying to track down the man who fired at Tex.

The next morning, Hickok arrives back at the Katey ranch. There he finds Jeter and his men waiting for him. Jeter accuses Hickok of murder. Queen pulls a gun and a conflict ensues wherein Cannonball manages to ride off for help. Hickok and Queen manage to gain the ranchhouse, where they manage to hold off Jeter and his gang until Cannonball returns with Tex and Dakota. The bad guys are captured, and Dakota agrees to move in with Queen and look after her and the ranch.

== Cast ==
- Wild Bill Elliott as Wild Bill Hickok/Prince Katey
- Tex Ritter as Tex Martin
- Frank Mitchell as Cannonball
- Dorothy Short as Dakota Brown
- Ralph Theodore as Clem Jeter
- Edythe Elliott as Queen Katey
- Forrest Taylor as Bert Brown
- Joe McGuinn as Beetle
- Tom Moray as Whip
- Art Mix as Spur
- Hal Taliaferro as Drummer
- Eddie Laughton as Bartender

== Reception ==
The Film Bulletin gave the picture a lukewarm review, calling it an "average Bill Elliott western". They complimented Elliot's performance, as well as that of Edythe Elliott, but panned the performances of Tex Ritter and Dorothy Short. They also enjoyed the work of Frank Mitchell, and felt the film had good action sequences, but opined that the romance in the picture fell flat. The Portland Press Herald gave it a favorable review, calling it a "blast of thrills and songs".
