= Code of the Cactus =

1939 film by Sam Newfield

- Lobby card
- Directed by: Sam Newfield
- Written by: Edward Halperin (original story); Edward Halperin (screenplay)
- Produced by: Sam Katzman
- Starring: See below
- Cinematography: Marcel Le Picard
- Edited by: Holbrook N. Todd
- Release date: February 25, 1939
- Running time: 56 minutes
- Country: United States
- Language: English

Code of the Cactus is a 1939 American Western film directed by Sam Newfield.

== Cast ==
- Tim McCoy as "Lightning" Bill Carson / Miguel
- Ben Corbett as Magpie
- Dorothy Short as Joan
- Ted Adams as Thurston
- Stephen Chase as Foreman James
- Dave O'Brien as Bob Swane
- Forrest Taylor as Blackton
- Bob Terry as Lefty, gang truck driver
- Slim Whitaker as Sheriff Burton
- Frank Wayne as Jake, gang truck shotgun

== Soundtrack ==
- Art Davis - "Across The Boundary Line" (Written by Johnny Lange and Lew Porter)
