= Homicide Bureau =

1939 film by Charles C. Coleman

- Directed by: Charles C. Coleman
- Screenplay by: Earle Snell
- Produced by: Irving Briskin (executive producer) (uncredited), Jack Frier (producer) (uncredited)
- Starring: Bruce Cabot, Rita Hayworth, and Marc Lawrence
- Cinematography: Benjamin H. Kline
- Edited by: James Sweeney
- Music by: Sidney Cutner (uncredited)
- Production company: Columbia Pictures
- Distributed by: Columbia Pictures
- Release date: January 5, 1939
- Running time: 58 minutes
- Country: USA
- Language: English

Homicide Bureau is a 1939 American action film, directed by Charles C. Coleman. It stars Bruce Cabot, Rita Hayworth, and Marc Lawrence.

== Cast ==
- Bruce Cabot as Jim Logan
- Rita Hayworth as J.G. Bliss
- Marc Lawrence as Chuck Brown
- Richard Fiske as Hank
- Moroni Olsen as Captain Haines
- Norman Willis as Briggs
- Gene Morgan as Blake
- Robert Paige as Thurston
- Lee Prather as Jamison
- Eddie Fetherston as Specks
- Stanley Andrews as Police Commissioner
