= Mel Thorsen =

American film editor

- Born: Melvin T. Thorsen; August 22, 1908; Los Angeles, California, USA
- Died: April 23, 1971 (aged 72); Los Angeles, California, USA
- Occupation: Film editor

Mel Thorsen (1908-1971) was an American film editor active primarily in the 1930s and 1940s.

== Biography ==
Mel was born in Los Angeles, California, to Michael Thorsen and Agnes Frautzen, both of whom were from Norway. He married June Waddell in 1932, and the pair had a son.

== Selected filmography ==
- Sword of the Avenger (1948)
- Klondike Kate (1943)
- Doughboys in Ireland (1943)
- Passport to Suez (1943)
- Power of the Press (1943)
- Bullets for Bandits (1942)
- Pardon My Gun (1942)
- Junior Army (1942)
- Smith of Minnesota (1942)
- Overland to Deadwood (1942)
- Parachute Nurse (1942)
- Not a Ladies' Man (1942)
- Down Rio Grande Way (1942)
- North of the Rockies (1942)
- Bullets for Bandits (1942)
- West of Tombstone (1942)
- The Lone Star Vigilantes (1942)
- Roaring Frontiers (1941)
- The Son of Davy Crockett (1941)
- The Medico of Painted Springs (1941)
- Hands Across the Rockies (1941)
- The Return of Daniel Boone (1941)
- The Pinto Kid (1941)
- The Stranger from Texas (1939)
