= La Croix-Avranchin =

- Part of Saint-James
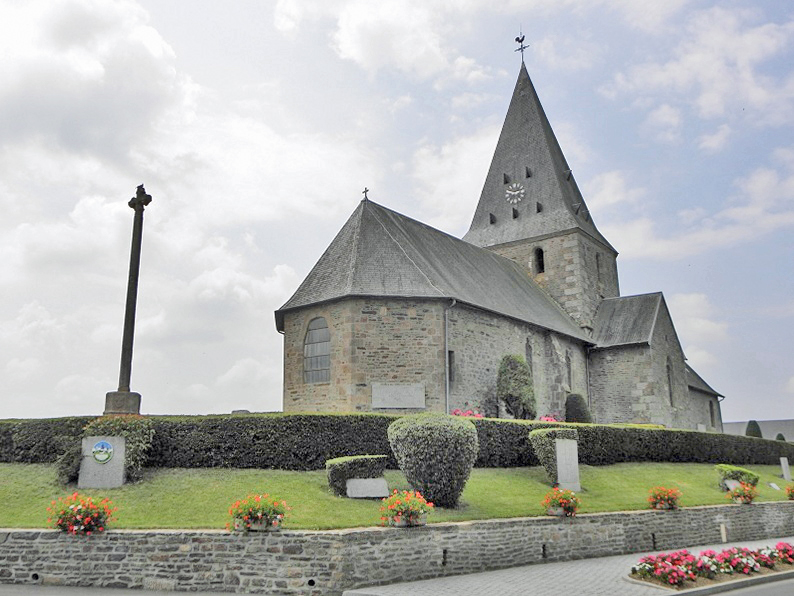
- The church of Sainte-Trinité
- Location of La Croix-Avranchin
- Location within France Location within Normandy
- Coordinates: 48°32′48″N 1°22′56″W
- Country: France
- Region: Normandy
- Department: Manche
- Arrondissement: Avranches
- Canton: Saint-Hilaire-du-Harcouët
- Commune: Saint-James
- Area^{1}: 10.79 km^{2} (4.17 sq mi)
- Elevation: 83 m (272 ft)
- Highest elevation: 92 m (302 ft)
- Lowest elevation: 33 m (108 ft)
- Population (2022): 456
  - Density: 42.3/km^{2} (109/sq mi)
- Time zone: UTC+01:00 (CET)
  - Summer (DST): UTC+02:00 (CEST)
- Postal code: 50240
- ^{1} French Land Register data, which excludes lakes, ponds, glaciers > 1 km^{2} (0.386 sq mi or 247 acres) and river estuaries.

La Croix-Avranchin (French pronunciation: [la kʁwa avʁɑ̃ʃɛ̃]) is a former commune in the Manche department in Normandy in north-western France. On 1 January 2017, it was merged into the commune Saint-James.

== See also ==
- Communes of the Manche department
