= Dorothy Short =

American actress (1915–1963)

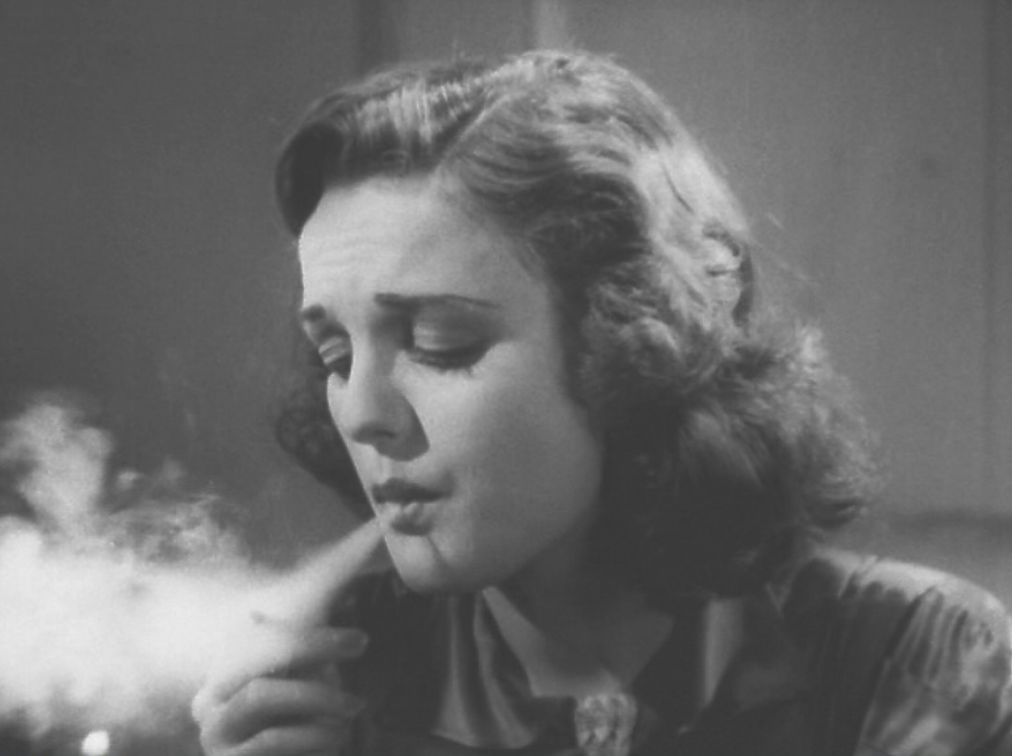
- Dorothy Short as Mary Lane in Reefer Madness (1936)
- Born: June 29, 1915; Philadelphia, Pennsylvania, U.S.
- Died: June 4, 1963 (aged 47); Los Angeles, California, U.S.
- Resting place: Inglewood Park Cemetery; Plot: Magnolia, Lot 35
- Years active: 1934–1953
- Spouse: Dave O'Brien (Fronabarger) (m. 1936; div. 1954)
- Children: 2

Dorothy Short (June 29, 1915 – June 4, 1963) was an American film actress, mainly in low-budget Westerns and serials in the 1930s and 1940s.

== Career ==
A native of Philadelphia, Short was the daughter of Mrs. E. M. Short. She began working in films for Metro-Goldwyn-Mayer in 1933 on a trial basis. In November 1933, a court in California approved a seven-year contract, with options, between the 18-year-old actress and the studio.

Short married actor Dave O'Brien in 1936, the same year they appeared together in the low-budget exploitation cheapie Reefer Madness, which in modern times has become a well-known cult film. She also appeared in another anti-marijuana film, Assassin of Youth, in 1937.

She often appeared alongside her husband in various 'B' pictures and the Pete Smith series of comedy shorts, in which O'Brien played the lead on many occasions during the 1940s.

After their divorce in 1954, Short retired from film acting, and died nine years later at age 47.

== Selected filmography ==
- The Call of the Savage (1935) as Mona Andreas
- Reefer Madness (1936) as Mary
- Damaged Goods (1937) as Table Dancer
- Brothers of the West (1937) as Annie Wade
- Assassin of Youth (1938) as Marjorie 'Marge' Barry
- Heart of Arizona (1938) as Jacqueline 'Jackie' Starr
- The Singing Cowgirl (1938) as Nora Pryde
- Where the Buffalo Roam (1938) as Laddie Gray
- Wild Horse Canyon (1938) as Jean Hall
- Code of the Cactus (1939) as Joan
- Daughter of the Tong (1939) as Marion Morgan
- Phantom Rancher (1940) as Ann Markham
- Frontier Crusader (1940) as Jenny Mason
- Pony Post (1940) as Alice Goodwin
- Trail of the Silver Spurs (1941) as Nancy Nordick
- Buzzy and the Phantom Pinto (1941) as Ruth Wade
- Spooks Run Wild (1941) as Linda Mason
- The Lone Rider Fights Back (1941) as Jean Dennison
- Bullets for Bandits (1942) as Dakota Brown
- Captain Midnight (1942) as Joyce Edwards
