= Charles C. Coleman (director) =

American film director

Charles Clifford Coleman, Jr. (December 29, 1901 – May 25, 1972) was an American film director, who usually worked as an assistant director.

Known informally as Buddy Coleman, the young man broke into pictures during the last months of the silent-film era, establishing himself at Columbia Pictures as an assistant director. He worked in that capacity on many of Columbia's early hits, including Platinum Blonde, Lady for a Day, So This Is Africa, It Happened One Night, Mr. Deeds Goes to Town, and Lost Horizon.

Like many of Columbia's employees working as apprentices, Coleman was ultimately promoted to full-fledged director. His trial attempt was a Tim McCoy western in 1934, and he was given steady B-picture assignments beginning in 1936, with Charles Starrett westerns and Don Terry action pictures. He remained with Columbia through 1940, billed as C. C. Coleman, Jr.

In 1941 Buddy Coleman joined the staff of Paramount Pictures, where he worked for more than two decades as an assistant director for many famous films, including Holiday Inn (1942), Five Graves to Cairo (1943), Double Indemnity (1944), The Blue Dahlia (1946), The Heiress (1949), Sunset Boulevard, Ace in the Hole (1951), A Place in the Sun (1951), Stalag 17 (1954), Sabrina (1954), The Spirit of St. Louis (1957), Vertigo (1958), and Hud (1963).

He retired in 1965 after completing one last assignment, released by Columbia: Genghis Khan.

== Filmography ==
=== Films as full director ===
- Voice in the Night (1934)
- Code of the Range (1936)
- Legion of Terror (1936)
- Dodge City Trail (1936)
- Parole Racket (1937)
- Criminals of the Air (1937)
- A Fight to the Finish (1937)
- Paid to Dance (1937)
- The Shadow (1937)
- When G-Men Step In (1938)
- Highway Patrol (1938)
- Squadron of Honor (1938)
- Flight to Fame (1938)
- Homicide Bureau (1939)
- My Son Is a Criminal (1939)
- Spoilers of the Range (1939)
- Missing Daughters (1939)
- Outpost of the Mounties (1939)
