= List of American films of 1940 =

American films released in 1940

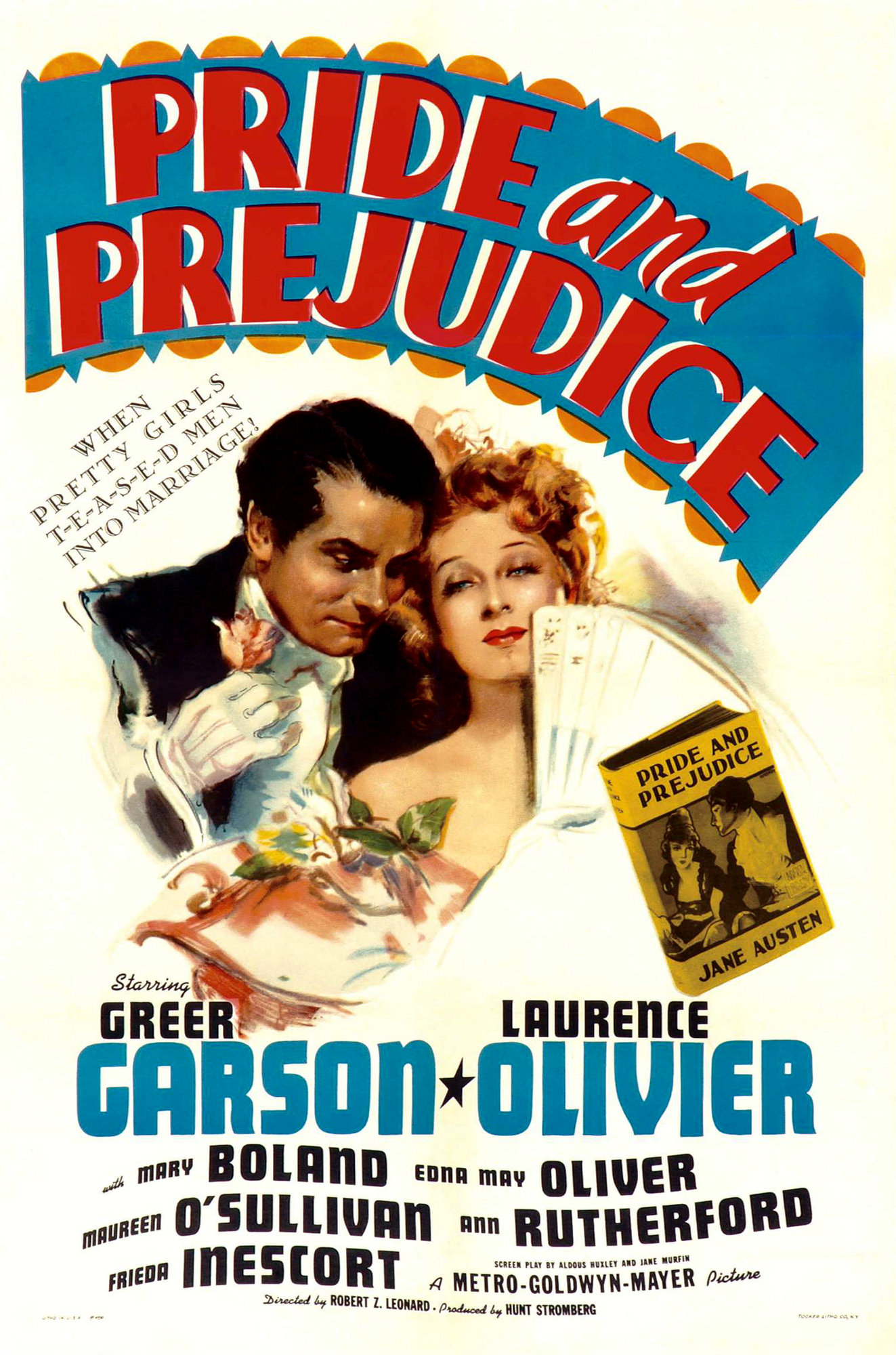
Pride and Prejudice starring Greer Garson and Laurence Olivier.

More than 477 American feature films were released in 1940. American film production was concentrated in Hollywood and was dominated by the eight Major film studios MGM, Paramount, Warner Bros., 20th Century Fox, RKO, Columbia, Universal and United Artists. Other significant production and distribution companies included Republic, Monogram and PRC.

Rebecca won Best Picture at the Academy Awards.

== # ==
Title	Director	Cast	Genre	Notes
20 Mule Team	Richard Thorpe	Wallace Beery, Leo Carrillo, Marjorie Rambeau, Anne Baxter	Western	MGM

== A ==
Title	Director	Cast	Genre	Notes
Abe Lincoln in Illinois	John Cromwell	Raymond Massey, Gene Lockhart, Ruth Gordon	Biography	RKO; nominated for 2 Academy Awards
Adventure in Diamonds	George Fitzmaurice	George Brent, Isa Miranda, John Loder	Drama	Paramount
Alias the Deacon	Christy Cabanne	Bob Burns, Mischa Auer, Peggy Moran	Comedy	Universal; remake of Alias the Deacon (1928)
All This, and Heaven Too	Anatole Litvak	Bette Davis, Charles Boyer, Jeffrey Lynn	Drama	Warner Bros.; nominated for 3 Academy Awards
Always a Bride	Noel M. Smith	Rosemary Lane, George Reeves, John Eldredge	Comedy	Warner Bros.; remake of Brides Are Like That (1936)
American Matchmaker	Edgar G. Ulmer	Leo Fuchs, Judith Abarbanel, Judel Dubinsky	Romance, Comedy	
Am I Guilty?	Sam Newfield	Ralph Cooper, Sybil Lewis, Sam McDaniel	Crime	Supreme
And One Was Beautiful	Robert B. Sinclair	Robert Cummings, Laraine Day, Jean Muir	Romantic drama	MGM
Andy Hardy Meets Debutante	George B. Seitz	Lewis Stone, Mickey Rooney, Cecilia Parker	Comedy	MGM; 9th of 16 Andy Hardy films
An Angel from Texas	Ray Enright	Eddie Albert, Rosemary Lane, Wayne Morris, Jane Wyman, Ronald Reagan	Romantic comedy	Warner Bros.; remake of The Butter and Egg Man (1928)
Angels Over Broadway	Ben Hecht, Lee Garmes	Douglas Fairbanks Jr., Rita Hayworth, Thomas Mitchell	Drama	Columbia; nominated for Academy Award
Anne of Windy Poplars	Jack Hively	Anne Shirley, James Ellison, Henry Travers	Drama	RKO; sequel to Anne of Green Gables (1934)
The Ape	William Nigh	Boris Karloff, Maris Wrixon, Dorothy Vaughan	Horror	Monogram
Argentine Nights	Albert S. Rogell	Ritz Brothers, The Andrews Sisters, Constance Moore, George Reeves	Musical comedy	Universal
Arise, My Love	Mitchell Leisen	Claudette Colbert, Ray Milland, Dennis O'Keefe	Romantic comedy	Paramount; 4 Academy Award nominations, won 1
Arizona	Wesley Ruggles	Jean Arthur, William Holden, Warren William	Western	Columbia; nominated for 2 Academy Awards
Arizona Frontier	Albert Herman	Tex Ritter, Evelyn Finley, Richard Cramer	Western	Monogram
Arizona Gang Busters	Sam Newfield	Tim McCoy, Forrest Taylor, Julian Rivero	Western	PRC

== B ==
Title	Director	Cast	Genre	Notes
Babies for Sale	Charles Barton	Rochelle Hudson, Glenn Ford, Miles Mander	Drama	Columbia
Bad Man from Red Butte	Ray Taylor	Johnny Mack Brown, Bob Baker, Fuzzy Knight	Western	Universal
The Bank Dick	Edward F. Cline	W. C. Fields, Cora Witherspoon, Una Merkel	Comedy	Universal
Barnyard Follies	Frank McDonald	Mary Lee, Harry Cheshire, Rufe Davis, June Storey, Isabel Randolph	Musical	Republic
Before I Hang	Nick Grinde	Boris Karloff, Evelyn Keyes, Bruce Bennett	Horror	Columbia
Behind the News	Joseph Santley	Lloyd Nolan, Doris Davenport, Frank Albertson	Drama	Republic; nominated for Academy Award
Beyond the Sacramento	Lambert Hillyer	Wild Bill Elliott, Evelyn Keyes, Dub Taylor	Western	Columbia
Beyond Tomorrow	A. Edward Sutherland	Jean Parker, Harry Carey, C. Aubrey Smith, Charles Winninger, Richard Carlson	Fantasy	RKO
A Bill of Divorcement	John Farrow	Maureen O'Hara, Adolphe Menjou, Fay Bainter	Drama	RKO; remake of 1932 film
Billy the Kid in Texas	Sam Newfield	Bob Steele, Al St. John, Carleton Young	Western	PRC; 2nd of 6 Billy the Kid films starring Steele
Billy the Kid Outlawed	Sam Newfield	Bob Steele, Louise Currie, Al St. John, Carleton Young	Western	PRC; 1st of 6 Billy the Kid films starring Steele
Billy the Kid's Gun Justice	Sam Newfield	Bob Steele, Al St. John, Louise Currie, Carleton Young	Western	PRC; 3rd of 6 Billy the Kid films starring Steele
The Biscuit Eater	Stuart Heisler	Billy Lee, Lester Matthews, Richard Lane	Drama	Paramount
Bitter Sweet	W. S. Van Dyke	Jeanette MacDonald, Nelson Eddy, George Sanders	Musical	MGM; nominated for 2 Academy Awards; based on Noël Coward operetta
Black Diamonds	Christy Cabanne	Richard Arlen, Andy Devine, Kathryn Adams Doty	Crime drama	Universal
Black Friday	Arthur Lubin	Boris Karloff, Bela Lugosi, Stanley Ridges	Science fiction	Universal
Blame It on Love	Wallace Fox	Joan Marsh, John King, Cecilia Loftus	Comedy, drama	Independent
Blazing Six Shooters	Joseph H. Lewis	Charles Starrett, Iris Meredith, Dick Curtis	Western	Columbia
Blondie Has Servant Trouble	Frank R. Strayer	Penny Singleton, Arthur Lake, Jonathan Hale	Comedy	Columbia; 6th of 28 Blondie films
Blondie on a Budget	Frank R. Strayer	Penny Singleton, Arthur Lake, Rita Hayworth	Comedy	Columbia; 5th of 28 Blondie films
Blondie Plays Cupid	Frank R. Strayer	Penny Singleton, Arthur Lake, Glenn Ford	Comedy	Columbia; 7th of 28 Blondie films
The Blue Bird	Walter Lang	Shirley Temple, Spring Byington, Nigel Bruce	Fantasy	20th Century Fox. Nominated for 2 Academy Awards
Boom Town	Jack Conway	Clark Gable, Spencer Tracy, Claudette Colbert	Drama	MGM; nominated for 2 Academy Awards
The Border Legion	Joseph Kane	Roy Rogers, George "Gabby" Hayes, Carol Hughes	Western	Republic
Boss of Bullion City	Ray Taylor	Johnny Mack Brown, Maria Montez, Nell O'Day	Western	Universal
Bowery Boy	William Morgan	Dennis O'Keefe, Louise Campbell, Jimmy Lydon, Helen Vinson	Crime	Republic
Boys of the City	Joseph H. Lewis	Bobby Jordan, Leo Gorcey, Hal E. Chester	Comedy, thriller	Monogram; 2nd of 22 East Side Kids films
The Boys from Syracuse	A. Edward Sutherland	Allan Jones, Irene Hervey, Martha Raye	Musical	Universal; nominated for 2 Academy Awards
Brigham Young	Henry Hathaway	Tyrone Power, Linda Darnell, Dean Jagger	Biography	20th Century Fox
British Intelligence	Terry O. Morse	Boris Karloff, Margaret Lindsay, Bruce Lester	Spy	Warner Bros.; third film adaptation of 1918 play Three Faces East
Broadway Melody of 1940	Norman Taurog	Fred Astaire, Eleanor Powell, George Murphy	Musical	MGM; final film in The Broadway Melody series
Broken Strings	Bernard B. Ray	Clarence Muse, Sybil Lewis, Tommie Moore	Drama	Independent
Brother Orchid	Lloyd Bacon	Edward G. Robinson, Humphrey Bogart, Ann Sothern	Crime, comedy	Warner Bros.
Brother Rat and a Baby	Ray Enright	Priscilla Lane, Wayne Morris, Jane Bryan	Comedy	Warner Bros.; sequel to Brother Rat (1938)
Buck Benny Rides Again	Mark Sandrich	Jack Benny, Ellen Drew, Eddie Anderson	Western comedy	Paramount; cast from The Jack Benny Program radio show
Bullet Code	David Howard	George O'Brien, Virginia Vale, Slim Whitaker	Western	RKO; remake of Melody of the Plains (1937)
Bullets for Rustlers	Sam Nelson	Charles Starrett, Lorna Gray, Bob Nolan	Western	Columbia
Buzzy Rides the Range	Richard C. Kahn	Robert "Buzz" Henry, David O'Brien, Claire Rochelle	Western	Independent

== C–D ==
Title	Director	Cast	Genre	Notes
Cafe Hostess	Sidney Salkow	Preston Foster, Ann Dvorak, Wynne Gibson	Crime drama	Columbia
Calling All Husbands	Noel M. Smith	George Tobias, Lucile Fairbanks, Ernest Truex	Comedy	Warner Bros. Remake of Too Young to Marry
Calling Philo Vance	William Clemens	James Stephenson, Margot Stevenson, Henry O'Neill	Mystery	Warner Bros. 12th (out of 15) film with Philo Vance character
Captain Caution	Richard Wallace	Victor Mature, Louise Platt, Leo Carrillo, Bruce Cabot, Alan Ladd	Adventure	United Artists. Nominated for Academy Award
The Captain Is a Lady	Robert B. Sinclair	Charles Coburn, Beulah Bondi, Virginia Grey	Comedy	MGM
Carolina Moon	Frank McDonald	Gene Autry, Smiley Burnette, June Storey	Western	Republic. Remake of Tumbling Tumbleweeds
The Carson City Kid	Joseph Kane	Roy Rogers, Bob Steele, Pauline Moore	Western	Republic
Castle on the Hudson	Anatole Litvak	John Garfield, Ann Sheridan, Pat O'Brien	Drama	Warner Bros. Remake of 20,000 Years in Sing Sing
Chad Hanna	Henry King	Henry Fonda, Dorothy Lamour, Linda Darnell	Romantic drama	20th Century Fox
Charlie Chan at the Wax Museum	Lynn Shores	Sidney Toler, Victor Sen Yung, C. Henry Gordon, Marguerite Chapman	Mystery	20th Century Fox. 6th (out of 22) with Toler as Charlie Chan
Charlie Chan in Panama	20th Century Fox. Norman Foster	Sidney Toler, Jean Rogers, Lionel Atwill	Mystery	20th Century Fox. 7th (out of 22) with Toler as Charlie Chan
Charlie Chan's Murder Cruise	Eugene Forde	Sidney Toler, Marjorie Weaver, Lionel Atwill	Mystery	20th Century Fox. 5th (out of 22) with Toler as Charlie Chan
Charter Pilot	Eugene Forde	Lloyd Nolan, Lynn Bari, Arleen Whelan	Adventure	20th Century Fox
Chasing Trouble	Howard Bretherton	Frankie Darro, Marjorie Reynolds, Mantan Moreland	Comedy, drama	Monogram
Cherokee Strip	Lesley Selander	Richard Dix, Florence Rice, William Henry	Western	Paramount
The Cheyenne Kid	Raymond K. Johnson	Jack Randall, Louise Stanley, Kenne Duncan	Western	Monogram
Christmas in July	Preston Sturges	Dick Powell, Ellen Drew, Raymond Walburn	Screwball comedy	Paramount
A Chump at Oxford	Alfred J. Goulding	Stan Laurel, Oliver Hardy, Forrester Harvey	Comedy	United Artists. Partial remake of From Soup to Nuts
City for Conquest	Anatole Litvak, Jean Negulesco	James Cagney, Ann Sheridan, Frank Craven	Drama	Warner Bros.
City of Chance	Ricardo Cortez	Lynn Bari, C. Aubrey Smith, Amanda Duff	Film noir	20th Century Fox
Colorado	Joseph Kane	Roy Rogers, George "Gabby" Hayes, Pauline Moore	Western	Republic
Comin' Round the Mountain	George Archainbaud	Bob Burns, Una Merkel, Jerry Colonna	Comedy	Paramount
Comrade X	King Vidor	Clark Gable, Hedy Lamarr, Oskar Homolka	Comedy Spy	MGM. Nominated for Academy Award
Congo Maisie	H. C. Potter	Ann Sothern, John Carroll, Rita Johnson	Comedy	MGM. Version of Red Dust (1932 film); 2nd (out of 10) film with Maisie Ravier character
Convicted Woman	Nick Grinde	Rochelle Hudson, Frieda Inescort, June Lang, Glenn Ford	Crime	Columbia
The Courageous Dr. Christian	Bernard Vorhaus	Jean Hersholt, Dorothy Lovett, Robert Baldwin	Drama	RKO
Covered Wagon Days	George Sherman	Robert Livingston, Raymond Hatton, Duncan Renaldo	Western	Republic. 29th (out of 51) film of The Three Mesquiteers series
Covered Wagon Trails	Raymond K. Johnson	Jack Randall, Sally Cairns, David Sharpe	Western	Monogram
The Cowboy from Sundown	Spencer Gordon Bennet	Tex Ritter, Roscoe Ates, Carleton Young	Western	Monogram
The Crooked Road	Phil Rosen	Edmund Lowe, Irene Hervey, Henry Wilcoxon	Crime drama	Republic
Cross-Country Romance	Frank Woodruff	Gene Raymond, Wendy Barrie, Hedda Hopper	Romantic comedy	RKO
Curtain Call	Frank Woodruff	Barbara Read, Alan Mowbray, Helen Vinson	Romantic comedy	RKO
Dance, Girl, Dance	Dorothy Arzner	Maureen O'Hara, Louis Hayward, Lucille Ball	Musical	RKO. Footage preserved in US National Registry
Dancing on a Dime	Joseph Santley	Robert Paige, Peter Lind Hayes, Eddie Quillan	Musical	Paramount
Danger Ahead	Ralph Staub	James Newill, Dorothea Kent, Guy Usher	Adventure	Monogram. 5th (out of 6) with Newill as Sgt. Renfrew of Royal Mounties
Danger on Wheels	Christy Cabanne	Richard Arlen, Andy Devine, Peggy Moran	Sports thriller	Universal
Dark Command	Raoul Walsh	Claire Trevor, John Wayne, Walter Pidgeon	Western	Republic. Nominated for 2 Academy Awards
Dark Streets of Cairo	László Kardos	Sigrid Gurie, Ralph Byrd, Eddie Quillan	Mystery	Universal
The Devil Bat	Jean Yarborough	Bela Lugosi, Suzanne Kaaren, Yolande Mallott	Horror	PRC
The Devil's Pipeline	Christy Cabanne	Richard Arlen, Andy Devine, Jean Brooks	Drama	Paramount
Diamond Frontier	Harold D. Schuster	Victor McLaglen, John Loder, Anne Nagel	Adventure	Universal
A Dispatch from Reuters	William Dieterle	Edward G. Robinson, Edna Best, Eddie Albert	Biography	Warner Bros.
The Doctor Takes a Wife	Alexander Hall	Loretta Young, Ray Milland, Gail Patrick	Romantic comedy	Columbia
Doomed to Die	William Nigh	Boris Karloff, Marjorie Reynolds, Grant Withers	Mystery	Monogram; Mr. Wong series
Double Alibi	Phil Rosen	Wayne Morris, Margaret Lindsay, William Gargan	Mystery	Universal
Down Argentine Way	Irving Cummings	Don Ameche, Betty Grable, Carmen Miranda	Musical	20th Century Fox. Nominated for 3 Academy Awards; #9 in Top Grossing Films
Dr. Christian Meets the Women	William C. McGann	Jean Hersholt, Veda Ann Borg, Edgar Kennedy	Mystery	RKO. Dr. Christian series
Dr. Cyclops	Ernest B. Schoedsack	Albert Dekker, Charles Halton, Janice Logan	Science Fiction Horror	Paramount. Nominated for Academy Award
Dr. Ehrlich's Magic Bullet	William Dieterle	Edward G. Robinson, Ruth Gordon, Otto Kruger	Biography	Warner Bros. Nominated for Academy Award
Dr. Kildare's Crisis	Harold S. Bucquet	Lew Ayres, Laraine Day, Robert Young	Drama	MGM
Dr. Kildare Goes Home	Harold S. Bucquet	Lew Ayres, Lionel Barrymore, Laraine Day	Drama	MGM
Dr. Kildare's Strange Case	Harold S. Bucquet	Lew Ayres, Lionel Barrymore, Laraine Day	Drama	MGM
Dreaming Out Loud	Harold Young	Lum and Abner, Frances Langford, Frank Craven	Comedy	RKO
Drums of the Desert	George Waggner	Ralph Byrd, Lorna Gray, Mantan Moreland	Western	Monogram
Dulcy	S. Sylvan Simon	Ann Sothern, Ian Hunter, Roland Young	Comedy	MGM
The Durango Kid	Lambert Hillyer	Charles Starrett, Luana Walters, Kenneth McDonald	Western	Columbia

== E–F ==
Title	Director	Cast	Genre	Notes
The Earl of Chicago	Richard Thorpe	Robert Montgomery, Edward Arnold, Reginald Owen	Comedy	MGM
Earl of Puddlestone	Gus Meins	James Gleason, Lucile Gleason, Lois Ranson	Comedy	Republic
Earthbound	Irving Pichel	Andrea Leeds, Warner Baxter, Lynn Bari	Drama	20th Century Fox
East of the River	Alfred E. Green	John Garfield, Brenda Marshall, Marjorie Rambeau	Drama	Warner Bros.
East Side Kids	Robert F. Hill	Leon Ames, Dennis Moore, Joyce Bryant	Comedy	Monogram. 1st (out of 22) film of East Side Kids series
Edison, the Man	Clarence Brown	Spencer Tracy, Rita Johnson, Lynne Overman	Biographical	MGM. Nominated for Academy Award
Ellery Queen, Master Detective	Kurt Neumann	Ralph Bellamy, Margaret Lindsay, Charley Grapewin	Mystery	Columbia
Emergency Squad	Edward Dmytryk	William Henry, Louise Campbell, Richard Denning	Action	Paramount
Enemy Agent	Lew Landers	Richard Cromwell, Helen Vinson, Robert Armstrong	Thriller	Universal
Escape	Mervyn LeRoy	Norma Shearer, Robert Taylor, Conrad Veidt	Drama	MGM
Escape to Glory	John Brahm	Pat O'Brien, Constance Bennett, Alan Baxter	War	Columbia
Fantasia	James Algar, Samuel Armstrong, 9 more	Leopold Stokowski, Deems Taylor	Animated	Disney. Won 2 Honorary Academy Awards; footage preserved in US National Registry; #1 in Top Grossing Films*
The Fargo Kid	Edward Killy	Tim Holt, Ray Whitley, Emmett Lynn	Western	RKO
The Farmer's Daughter	James P. Hogan	Martha Raye, Charlie Ruggles, Richard Denning	Comedy	Paramount
The Fatal Hour	William Nigh	Boris Karloff, Marjorie Reynolds, Grant Withers	Thriller	Monogram
Father Is a Prince	Noel M. Smith	John Litel, Jan Clayton, George Reeves	Drama	Warner Bros.
The Fight for Life	Pare Lorentz	Myron McCormick, Will Geer, Dudley Digges	Drama	Columbia. Nominated for Academy Award
The Fighting 69th	William Keighley	James Cagney, Pat O'Brien, George Brent	War	Warner Bros.
Five Little Peppers at Home	Charles Barton	Edith Fellows, Tommy Bond, Clarence Kolb	Comedy	Columbia
Five Little Peppers in Trouble	Charles Barton	Edith Fellows, Tommy Bond, Pierre Watkin	Comedy	Columbia. Last of series
Flight Angels	Lewis Seiler	Virginia Bruce, Jane Wyman, Ralph Bellamy	Drama	Warner Bros.
Flight Command	Frank Borzage	Robert Taylor, Ruth Hussey, Walter Pidgeon	War	MGM. Nominated for Academy Award
Florian	Edwin L. Marin	Robert Young, Helen Gilbert, Charles Coburn	Drama	MGM
Flowing Gold	Alfred E. Green	John Garfield, Frances Farmer, Pat O'Brien	Adventure	Warner Bros.
Foreign Correspondent	Alfred Hitchcock	Joel McCrea, Laraine Day, Herbert Marshall	Spy thriller	United Artists. Nominated for 6 Academy Awards; #15 in Top Grossing Films
Forgotten Girls	Phil Rosen	Louise Platt, Donald Woods, Wynne Gibson	Drama	Republic
Forty Little Mothers	Busby Berkeley	Eddie Cantor, Judith Anderson, Rita Johnson	Drama	MGM
Four Shall Die	William Beaudine	Mantan Moreland, Dorothy Dandridge, Vernon McCalla	Crime	Independent
Four Sons	Archie Mayo	Don Ameche, Eugenie Leontovich, Mary Beth Hughes	War drama	20th Century Fox. Remake of Four Sons (1928 silent film)
Framed	Harold D. Schuster	Frank Albertson, Constance Moore, Jerome Cowan	Crime	Universal
Free, Blonde and 21	Ricardo Cortez	Lynn Bari, Joan Davis, Mary Beth Hughes	Comedy	20th Century Fox
Friendly Neighbors	Nick Grinde	Leon Weaver, Frank Weaver, Lois Ranson	Comedy	Republic
French Without Tears	Anthony Asquith	Ray Milland, Ellen Drew, Janine Darcey	Comedy	Paramount
Frontier Crusader	Sam Newfield	Tim McCoy, Dorothy Short, Karl Hackett	Western	PRC
Frontier Vengeance	George Sherman	Don "Red" Barry, Cindy Walker, Kenneth MacDonald	Western	Republic
Fugitive from a Prison Camp	Lewis D. Collins	Jack Holt, Marian Marsh, Robert Barrat	Thriller	Columbia
A Fugitive from Justice	Terry O. Morse	Roger Pryor, Lucile Fairbanks, Eddie Foy Jr.	Crime drama	Warner Bros.

== G–H ==
Title	Director	Cast	Genre	Notes
Gallant Sons	George B. Seitz	Jackie Cooper, Gail Patrick, Bonita Granville	Drama	MGM
Gambling on the High Seas	George Amy	Wayne Morris, Jane Wyman, Gilbert Roland	Drama	Warner Bros.
Gangs of Chicago	Arthur Lubin	Lloyd Nolan, Lola Lane, Barton MacLane	Crime	Republic
Gaucho Serenade	Frank McDonald	Gene Autry, June Storey, Duncan Renaldo	Western	Republic
The Gay Caballero	Otto Brower	Cesar Romero, Sheila Ryan, Robert Sterling	Western	20th Century Fox
The Ghost Breakers	George Marshall	Bob Hope, Paulette Goddard, Richard Carlson, Anthony Quinn	Horror comedy	Paramount
The Ghost Comes Home	Wilhelm Thiele	Frank Morgan, Billie Burke, Ann Rutherford	Comedy	MGM
Ghost Valley Raiders	George Sherman	Don "Red" Barry, Lona Andre, LeRoy Mason	Western	Republic
Girl from Avenue A	Otto Brower	Jane Withers, Kent Taylor, Kay Aldridge	Comedy	20th Century Fox
Girl from God's Country	Sidney Salkow	Chester Morris, Jane Wyatt, Charles Bickford	Drama	Republic
Girl from Havana	Lew Landers	Claire Carleton, Dennis O'Keefe, Steffi Duna	Drama	Republic
Girl in 313	Ricardo Cortez	Florence Rice, Lionel Atwill, Kay Aldridge	Drama	20th Century Fox
Girls of the Road	Nick Grinde	Ann Dvorak, Helen Mack, Lola Lane	Action	Columbia
Girls Under 21	Max Nosseck	Bruce Cabot, Rochelle Hudson, Paul Kelly	Drama	Columbia
Give Us Wings	Charles Lamont	Billy Halop, Huntz Hall, Gabriel Dell	Adventure	Universal. Dead End Kids
Glamour for Sale	D. Ross Lederman	Anita Louise, Roger Pryor, Frances Robinson	Crime	Columbia
The Golden Fleecing	Leslie Fenton	Lew Ayres, Rita Johnson, Lloyd Nolan	Comedy	MGM. Written by S. J. Perelman
Golden Gloves	Edward Dmytryk	Richard Denning, Jeanne Cagney, J. Carrol Naish	Drama	Paramount
The Golden Trail	Albert Herman	Tex Ritter, Stanley Price, Warner Richmond	Western	Monogram
Gold Rush Maisie	Edwin L. Marin	Ann Sothern, Lee Bowman, Virginia Weidler	Comedy	MGM; third in series
Go West	Edward Buzzell	Marx Brothers, John Carroll, Diana Lewis	Comedy	MGM
Grand Ole Opry	Frank McDonald	Leon Weaver, Frank Weaver, Lois Ranson	Comedy	Republic
Grandpa Goes to Town	Gus Meins	James Gleason, Lucile Gleason, Lois Ranson	Comedy	Republic
Granny Get Your Gun	George Amy	May Robson, Margot Stevenson, Harry Davenport	Comedy	Warner Bros.
The Grapes of Wrath	John Ford	Henry Fonda, Jane Darwell, John Carradine	Drama	20th Century Fox. Won 2 Academy Awards, one for Best Director; another 5 nominations; footage preserved in US National Registry; #12 in Top Grossing Films
The Great Dictator	Charles Chaplin	Charles Chaplin, Paulette Goddard, Jack Oakie	Comedy	United Artists. Nominated for 5 Academy Awards; footage preserved in US National Registry
The Great McGinty	Preston Sturges	Brian Donlevy, Muriel Angelus, Akim Tamiroff	Comedy	Paramount. Won Academy Award for screenplay
The Great Plane Robbery	Lewis D. Collins	Jack Holt, Stanley Fields, Noel Madison	Crime	Columbia
The Great Profile	Walter Lang	John Barrymore, Mary Beth Hughes, Gregory Ratoff	Comedy	20th Century Fox
Green Hell	James Whale	Douglas Fairbanks Jr., Joan Bennett, John Howard	Adventure	Universal
Gun Code	Sam Newfield	Tim McCoy, Inna Gest, Carleton Young	Western	PRC
Half a Sinner	Al Christie	Heather Angel, John King, Constance Collier	Mystery	Universal
Haunted House	Robert F. McGowan	Jackie Moran, Marcia Mae Jones, George Cleveland	Mystery	Monogram
He Married His Wife	Roy Del Ruth	Joel McCrea, Nancy Kelly, Roland Young	Comedy	20th Century Fox
He Stayed for Breakfast	Alexander Hall	Loretta Young, Melvyn Douglas, Alan Marshal	Comedy	Columbia
Her First Romance	Edward Dmytryk	Edith Fellows, Julie Bishop, Alan Ladd	Musical	Monogram
Heroes of the Saddle	William Witney	Robert Livingston, Raymond Hatton, Duncan Renaldo	Western	Republic
Hidden Enemy	Howard Bretherton	Warren Hull, Kay Linaker, Wilhelm von Brincken	Thriller	Monogram
Hidden Gold	Lesley Selander	William Boyd, Russell Hayden, Minor Watson	Western	Paramount
High School	George Nicholls Jr.	Jane Withers, Lloyd Corrigan, Claire Du Brey	Comedy	20th Century Fox
Hired Wife	William A. Seiter	Rosalind Russell, Brian Aherne, Virginia Bruce	Comedy	Universal
His Girl Friday	Howard Hawks	Cary Grant, Rosalind Russell, Ralph Bellamy	Screwball comedy	Columbia. Remake of The Front Page (1931); remade in 1974
Hit Parade of 1941	John H. Auer	Kenny Baker, Frances Langford, Hugh Herbert, Ann Miller	Musical comedy	Republic, nominated for 2 Academy Awards
Hold That Woman!	Sam Newfield	Frances Gifford, James Dunn, Rita La Roy	Comedy	PRC
Honeymoon Deferred	Lew Landers	Edmund Lowe, Margaret Lindsay, Elisabeth Risdon	Mystery	Universal
Hot Steel	Christy Cabanne	Richard Arlen, Andy Devine, Peggy Moran	Drama	Universal
The House Across the Bay	Archie Mayo	George Raft, Joan Bennett, Lloyd Nolan	Crime drama	United Artists
The House of the Seven Gables	Joe May	George Sanders, Margaret Lindsay, Nan Grey, Vincent Price, Dick Foran	Thriller	Universal; nominated for Academy Award
The Howards of Virginia	Frank Lloyd	Cary Grant, Martha Scott, Cedric Hardwicke	Period Drama	Columbia; nominated for 2 Academy Awards
Hullabaloo	Edwin L. Marin	Frank Morgan, Virginia Grey, Dan Dailey	Musical comedy	MGM

== I–J ==
Title	Director	Cast	Genre	Notes
I Can't Give You Anything But Love, Baby	Albert S. Rogell	Broderick Crawford, Peggy Moran, Gertrude Michael	Comedy	Universal
I Love You Again	W. S. Van Dyke	William Powell, Myrna Loy, Edmund Lowe	Romantic comedy	MGM
I Take This Oath	Sam Newfield	Joyce Compton, Gordon Jones, Veda Ann Borg	Drama	PRC
I Take This Woman	W. S. Van Dyke	Spencer Tracy, Hedy Lamarr, Laraine Day	Drama	MGM
I Want a Divorce	Ralph Murphy	Joan Blondell, Dick Powell, Gloria Dickson	Comedy	Paramount
If I Had My Way	David Butler	Bing Crosby, Gloria Jean, Claire Dodd	Musical	Paramount
I'm Nobody's Sweetheart Now	Arthur Lubin	Helen Parrish, Constance Moore, Dennis O'Keefe	Drama	Universal
I'm Still Alive	Irving Reis	Kent Taylor, Linda Hayes, Ralph Morgan	Drama	RKO
In Old Missouri	Frank McDonald	Leon Weaver, Frank Weaver, June Storey	Comedy	Republic
The Invisible Man Returns	Joe May	Cedric Hardwicke, Vincent Price, Nan Grey	Universal. Science fiction	Nominated for Academy Award
The Invisible Woman	A. Edward Sutherland	Virginia Bruce, John Barrymore, John Howard	Science fiction Comedy	Universal. Nominated for Academy Award
Irene	Herbert Wilcox	Anna Neagle, Ray Milland, Roland Young	Musical	RKO. Nominated for Academy Award
Island of Doomed Men	Charles Barton	Peter Lorre, Rochelle Hudson, Robert Wilcox	Horror	Columbia
Isle of Destiny	Elmer Clifton	William Gargan, Wallace Ford, June Lang	Adventure	RKO
It All Came True	Lewis Seiler	Ann Sheridan, Jeffrey Lynn, Humphrey Bogart	Comedy	Warner Bros.
It's a Date	William A. Seiter	Deanna Durbin, Kay Francis, Walter Pidgeon	Musical	Universal
I Was an Adventuress	Gregory Ratoff	Vera Zorina, Richard Greene, Erich von Stroheim	Drama	20th Century Fox
Jennie	David Burton	Virginia Gilmore, George Montgomery, Ludwig Stössel	Drama	20th Century Fox
Johnny Apollo	Henry Hathaway	Tyrone Power, Dorothy Lamour, Edward Arnold	Crime drama	20th Century Fox

== K–L ==
Title	Director	Cast	Genre	Notes
Keeping Company	S. Sylvan Simon	Frank Morgan, Ann Rutherford, Irene Rich	Drama	MGM
The Kid from Santa Fe	Raymond K. Johnson	Jack Randall, Forrest Taylor, Tom London	Western	Monogram
King of the Lumberjacks	William Clemens	John Payne, Gloria Dickson, Stanley Fields	Drama	Warner Bros.
Kit Carson	George B. Seitz	Jon Hall, Lynn Bari, Dana Andrews	Western	United Artists
Kitty Foyle	Sam Wood	Ginger Rogers, Dennis Morgan, James Craig	Drama	RKO. Won Academy Award for Best Actress; another 4 nominations
Knights of the Range	Lesley Selander	Russell Hayden, Victor Jory, Jean Parker	Western	Paramount
Knute Rockne, All American	Lloyd Bacon	Pat O'Brien, Ronald Reagan, Gale Page	Biographical	Warner Bros. Story of football coach Knute Rockne
La Conga Nights	Lew Landers	Hugh Herbert, Constance Moore, Dennis O'Keefe	Comedy	Universal
Laddie	Jack Hively	Tim Holt, Virginia Gilmore, Spring Byington	Drama	RKO
Ladies Must Live	Noel M. Smith	Rosemary Lane, Wayne Morris, Lee Patrick	Comedy	Warner Bros.
The Lady in Question	Charles Vidor	Brian Aherne, Glenn Ford, Rita Hayworth	Comedy	Columbia
Lady with Red Hair	Curtis Bernhardt	Miriam Hopkins, Claude Rains, Richard Ainley	Drama	Warner Bros.
Land of the Six Guns	Raymond K. Johnson	Jack Randall, Louise Stanley, Glenn Strange	Western	Monogram
The Last Alarm	William Beaudine	J. Farrell MacDonald, Polly Ann Young, Warren Hull	Crime	Monogram
Laughing at Danger	Howard Bretherton	Frankie Darro, Joy Hodges, Kay Sutton	Crime	Monogram
Law and Order	Ray Taylor	Johnny Mack Brown, Nell O'Day, James Craig	Western	Universal
The Leather Pushers	John Rawlins	Richard Arlen, Andy Devine, Astrid Allwyn	Comedy	Universal
Legion of the Lawless	David Howard	George O'Brien, Virginia Vale, Herbert Heywood	Western	RKO
The Letter	William Wyler	Bette Davis, Herbert Marshall, James Stephenson	Film noir	Warner Bros. Nominated for 7 Academy Awards
The Light of Western Stars	Lesley Selander	Victor Jory, Jo Ann Sayers, Russell Hayden	Western	Paramount
Lightning Strikes West	Harry L. Fraser	Ken Maynard, Claire Rochelle, Charles King	Western	Independent
Lillian Russell	Irving Cummings	Alice Faye, Don Ameche, Henry Fonda	Biographical	20th Century Fox. Nominated for Academy Award
Li'l Abner	Albert S. Rogell	Jeff York, Martha O'Driscoll, Mona Ray	Comedy	RKO
A Little Bit of Heaven	Andrew Marton	Gloria Jean, Hugh Herbert, Robert Stack	Musical	Universal. Followup to The Under-Pup (1939 film)
Little Men	Norman Z. McLeod	Kay Francis, Jack Oakie, Ann Gillis	Drama	RKO. Based on novel by Louisa May Alcott
Little Nellie Kelly	Norman Taurog	Judy Garland, George Murphy, Charles Winninger	Musical comedy	MGM
Little Old New York	Henry King	Fred MacMurray, Alice Faye, Richard Greene, Brenda Joyce	Drama	20th Century Fox
Little Orvie	Ray McCarey	Johnny Sheffield, Ernest Truex, Dorothy Tree	Comedy drama	RKO
Lone Star Raiders	George Sherman	Robert Livingston, Bob Steele, June Johnson	Western	Republic
The Lone Wolf Meets a Lady	Sidney Salkow	Warren William, Jean Muir, Eric Blore	Mystery	Columbia
The Lone Wolf Strikes	Sidney Salkow	Warren William, Joan Perry, Eric Blore	Mystery	Columbia
The Long Voyage Home	John Ford	John Wayne, Thomas Mitchell, Ian Hunter	War Drama	United Artists. Nominated for 6 Academy Awards
Love, Honor and Oh-Baby!	Charles Lamont	Wallace Ford, Mona Barrie, Donald Woods	Comedy	Universal
Love Thy Neighbor	Mark Sandrich	Jack Benny, Fred Allen, Mary Martin	Comedy	Paramount
Lucky Cisco Kid	H. Bruce Humberstone	Cesar Romero, Mary Beth Hughes, Dana Andrews	Western	20th Century Fox
Lucky Partners	Lewis Milestone	Ronald Colman, Ginger Rogers, Jack Carson	Romantic comedy	RKO

== M–N ==
Title	Director	Cast	Genre	Notes
Ma! He's Making Eyes at Me	Harold D. Schuster	Tom Brown, Constance Moore, Anne Nagel	Comedy	Universal
Maisie Was a Lady	Edwin L. Marin	Ann Sothern, Lew Ayres, Maureen O'Sullivan	Comedy	MGM; 4th of series
The Man from Dakota	Leslie Fenton	Wallace Beery, Dolores del Río, John Howard	Historical Drama	MGM
The Man from Tumbleweeds	Joseph H. Lewis	Wild Bill Elliott, Iris Meredith, Dub Taylor	Western	Columbia
Manhattan Heartbeat	David Burton	Robert Sterling, Virginia Gilmore, Joan Davis	Drama	20th Century Fox
The Man I Married	Irving Pichel	Joan Bennett, Francis Lederer, Anna Sten	Drama	20th Century Fox
The Man Who Wouldn't Talk	David Burton	Lloyd Nolan, Jean Rogers, Eric Blore	Mystery	20th Century Fox
The Man with Nine Lives	Nick Grinde	Boris Karloff, Jo Ann Sayers, Roger Pryor	Horror; Sci-fi	Columbia
Margie	Otis Garrett	Tom Brown, Nan Grey, Joy Hodges	Comedy	Universal
The Marines Fly High	Benjamin Stoloff, George Nicholls Jr.	Richard Dix, Chester Morris, Lucille Ball	Adventure	RKO
The Mark of Zorro	Rouben Mamoulian	Tyrone Power, Linda Darnell, Basil Rathbone	Adventure	20th Century Fox. Nominated for Academy Award; footage preserved in US National Registry
Marked Men	Sam Newfield	Warren Hull, Isabel Jewell, John Dilson	Drama	PRC
Married and in Love	John Farrow	Barbara Read, Patric Knowles, Helen Vinson	Drama	RKO
Maryland	Henry King	Walter Brennan, Fay Bainter, Brenda Joyce	Drama	20th Century Fox
Meet the Missus	Malcolm St. Clair	Roscoe Karns, Ruth Donnelly, Lois Ranson	Comedy	Republic
Meet the Wildcat	Arthur Lubin	Ralph Bellamy, Margaret Lindsay, Joseph Schildkraut	Drama	Universal
Melody and Moonlight	Joseph Santley	Jane Frazee, Johnny Downs, Barbara Jo Allen	Comedy	Republic
Melody Ranch	Joseph Santley	Gene Autry, Jimmy Durante, Ann Miller	Western	Republic
Men Against the Sky	Leslie Goodwins	Richard Dix, Kent Taylor, Edmund Lowe	Drama	RKO
Men Without Souls	Nick Grinde	Barton MacLane, Rochelle Hudson, Glenn Ford	Crime	Columbia
Mexican Spitfire	Leslie Goodwins	Lupe Vélez, Leon Errol, Donald Woods	Comedy	RKO. First of series
Mexican Spitfire Out West	Leslie Goodwins	Lupe Vélez, Leon Errol, Donald Woods	Comedy	RKO. Second of series
Michael Shayne, Private Detective	Eugene Forde	Lloyd Nolan, Marjorie Weaver, Joan Valerie	Mystery	20th Century Fox. First of series
Midnight Limited	Howard Bretherton	John 'Dusty' King, Marjorie Reynolds, George Cleveland	Mystery	Monogram
Military Academy	D. Ross Lederman	Tommy Kelly, Bobby Jordan, David Holt	Drama	Columbia
Millionaire Playboy	Leslie Goodwins	Joe Penner, Russ Brown, Linda Hayes	Comedy	RKO
Millionaires in Prison	Ray McCarey	Lee Tracy, Linda Hayes, Raymond Walburn	Drama	RKO
Misbehaving Husbands	William Beaudine	Betty Blythe, Harry Langdon, Esther Muir	Comedy	PRC
Money and the Woman	William K. Howard	Jeffrey Lynn, Brenda Marshall, Lee Patrick	Drama	Warner Bros.
Moon Over Burma	Louis King	Dorothy Lamour, Robert Preston, Doris Nolan	Romance	Paramount
The Mortal Storm	Frank Borzage	James Stewart, Margaret Sullavan, Robert Young, Frank Morgan	Drama	MGM
The Mummy's Hand	Christy Cabanne	Dick Foran, Peggy Moran, Wallace Ford	Horror	Universal
Murder in the Air	Lewis Seiler	Ronald Reagan, John Litel, Lya Lys	Drama	Warner Bros
Murder on the Yukon	Louis J. Gasnier	James Newill, Polly Ann Young, Dave O'Brien	Western	Monogram
Murder Over New York	Harry Lachman	Sidney Toler, Ricardo Cortez, Marjorie Weaver	Mystery	20th Century Fox. Charlie Chan
Music in My Heart	Joseph Santley	Tony Martin, Rita Hayworth, Edith Fellows	Musical	Columbia. Nominated for Academy Award
My Favorite Wife	Garson Kanin	Irene Dunne, Cary Grant, Randolph Scott	Screwball comedy	RKO. Nominated for 3 Academy Awards
My Little Chickadee	Edward F. Cline	Mae West, W. C. Fields, Dick Foran	Comedy	Universal
My Love Came Back	Curtis Bernhardt	Olivia de Havilland, Jeffrey Lynn, Jane Wyman	Romance	Warner Bros.
My Son, My Son!	Charles Vidor	Madeleine Carroll, Brian Aherne, Louis Hayward	Drama	United Artists. Nominated for Academy Award
Mystery in Swing	Arthur Dreifuss	Monte Hawley, Marguerite Whitten, Tommie Moore	Music	Independent
Mystery Sea Raider	Edward Dmytryk	Carole Landis, Henry Wilcoxon, Onslow Stevens	Drama	Paramount
New Moon	Jack Conway	Jeanette MacDonald, Nelson Eddy	Musical drama	MGM
A Night at Earl Carroll's	Kurt Neumann	Ken Murray, J. Carrol Naish, Rose Hobart	Musical	Paramount
Night Train to Munich	Carol Reed	Margaret Lockwood, Rex Harrison, Paul Henreid	Thriller	20th Century Fox
Nobody's Children	Charles Barton	Edith Fellows, Georgia Caine, Lois Wilson	Drama	Columbia
North West Mounted Police	Cecil B. DeMille	Gary Cooper, Madeleine Carroll, Paulette Goddard	Western	Paramount. Won Academy Award for editing; 4 more nominations
Northwest Passage	King Vidor, Jack Conway, W. S. Van Dyke	Spencer Tracy, Robert Young, Walter Brennan	Adventure	MGM. Nominated for Academy Award; #19 in Top Grossing Films
No, No, Nanette	Herbert Wilcox	Anna Neagle, Richard Carlson, Victor Mature	Comedy	RKO
No Time for Comedy	William Keighley	James Stewart, Rosalind Russell, Genevieve Tobin	Comedy	Warner Bros.

== O–R ==
Title	Director	Cast	Genre	Notes
Oh Johnny, How You Can Love	Charles Lamont	Tom Brown, Peggy Moran, Allen Jenkins	Comedy	Universal
Oklahoma Renegades	Nate Watt	Robert Livingston, Raymond Hatton, Florine McKinney	Western	Republic
The Old Swimmin' Hole	Robert F. McGowan	Jackie Moran, Marcia Mae Jones, Leatrice Joy	Drama	Monogram
On the Spot	Howard Bretherton	Frankie Darro, Mary Kornman, Mantan Moreland	Comedy	Monogram
One Crowded Night	Irving Reis	Billie Seward, William Haade, Charles Lang	Drama	RKO
One Man's Law	George Sherman	Don "Red" Barry, Janet Waldo, George Cleveland	Western	Republic
One Million B.C.	Hal Roach Jr., Hal Roach	Victor Mature, Carole Landis, Lon Chaney Jr.	Fantasy	United Artists. Nominated for 2 Academy Awards
One Night in the Tropics	A. Edward Sutherland	Abbott and Costello, Nancy Kelly, Allan Jones	Comedy	Universal. Film debut of Bud Abbott and Lou Costello
On Their Own	Otto Brower	Spring Byington, June Carlson, Kenneth Howell	Comedy	20th Century Fox
Opened by Mistake	George Archainbaud	Charles Ruggles, Janice Logan, Robert Paige	Comedy	Paramount
Our Town	Sam Wood	William Holden, Martha Scott, Fay Bainter	Drama	United Artists. Nominated for 6 Academy Awards
Out West with the Peppers	Charles Barton	Edith Fellows, Tommy Bond, Pierre Watkin	Western	Columbia. Third of series
Outside the Three-Mile Limit	Lewis D. Collins	Jack Holt, Harry Carey, Irene Ware	Crime	Columbia
Pals of the Silver Sage	Albert Herman	Tex Ritter, Sugar Dawn, Glenn Strange	Western	Monogram
Parole Fixer	Robert Florey	William Henry, Virginia Dale, Anthony Quinn	Drama	Paramount
Passport to Alcatraz	Lewis D. Collins	Jack Holt, Noah Beery, Cecilia Callejo	Thriller	Columbia
Phantom of Chinatown	Phil Rosen	Keye Luke, Grant Withers, Lotus Long	Mystery	Monogram
Phantom Raiders	Jacques Tourneur	Walter Pidgeon, Florence Rice, Joseph Schildkraut	Drama	MGM
Phantom Rancher	Harry L. Fraser	Ken Maynard, Dorothy Short, Harry Harvey	Western	Independent
The Phantom Submarine	Charles Barton	Anita Louise, Bruce Bennett, Oscar O'Shea	Adventure	Columbia
The Philadelphia Story	George Cukor	Cary Grant, Katharine Hepburn, James Stewart	Screwball comedy	MGM. Won 2 Academy Awards; 4 more nominations
Pier 13	Eugene Forde	Lynn Bari, Lloyd Nolan, Joan Valerie	Mystery	20th Century Fox
Pinocchio	T. Hee, Wilfred Jackson, Jack Kinney	voices of Cliff Edwards, Evelyn Venable, Mel Blanc	Animated	Disney. Won 2 Academy Awards; footage preserved in US National Registry; #2 in Top Grossing Films*
Pinto Canyon	Raymond K. Johnson	Bob Steele, Louise Stanley, Kenne Duncan	Western	Monogram
Pioneer Days	Harry S. Webb	Jack Randall, Frank Yaconelli, Nelson McDowell	Western	Monogram
Pioneers of the Frontier	Sam Nelson	Wild Bill Elliott, Dorothy Comingore, Dick Curtis	Western	Columbia
Pioneers of the West	Lester Orlebeck	Robert Livingston, Raymond Hatton, Duncan Renaldo	Western	Republic
Pony Post	Ray Taylor	Johnny Mack Brown, Fuzzy Knight, Nell O'Day	Western	Universal
Pop Always Pays	Leslie Goodwins	Leon Errol, Dennis O'Keefe, Pamela Blake	Comedy	RKO
Prairie Law	David Howard	George O'Brien, Virginia Vale, Dick Hogan	Western	RKO
Prairie Schooners	Sam Nelson	Wild Bill Elliott, Evelyn Young, Kenneth Harlan	Western	Columbia
Pride and Prejudice	Robert Z. Leonard	Greer Garson, Laurence Olivier, Edward Ashley	Drama	MGM. Won Academy Award (art direction); #20 in Top Grossing Films
Pride of the Bowery	Joseph H. Lewis	East Side Kids, Mary Ainslee, Kenneth Harlan	Comedy	Monogram
Primrose Path	Gregory La Cava	Ginger Rogers, Joel McCrea, Marjorie Rambeau	Drama	RKO. Rambeau nominated for Academy Award
Private Affairs	Albert S. Rogell	Nancy Kelly, Roland Young, Robert Cummings	Comedy	Universal
Public Deb No. 1	Gregory Ratoff	Brenda Joyce, George Murphy, Ralph Bellamy	Comedy	20th Century Fox
The Quarterback	H. Bruce Humberstone	Wayne Morris, Virginia Dale, Lillian Cornell	Comedy	Paramount
Queen of the Mob	James P. Hogan	Ralph Bellamy, Blanche Yurka, Jeanne Cagney	Crime	Paramount
Queen of the Yukon	Phil Rosen	Charles Bickford, Irene Rich, June Carlson	Adventure	Monogram
Ragtime Cowboy Joe	Ray Taylor	Johnny Mack Brown, Nell O'Day, Dick Curtis	Western	Universal
Rainbow Over the Range	Albert Herman	Tex Ritter, Dorothy Fay, Warner Richmond	Western	Monogram
Rancho Grande	Frank McDonald	Gene Autry, June Storey, Mary Lee	Western	Republic
The Range Busters	S. Roy Luby	Ray "Crash" Corrigan, Max Terhune, Luana Walters	Western	Monogram
The Ranger and the Lady	Joseph Kane	Roy Rogers, Julie Bishop, George "Gabby" Hayes	Western	Republic
Rangers of Fortune	Sam Wood	Fred MacMurray, Albert Dekker, Patricia Morison	Western	Paramount
Rebecca	Alfred Hitchcock	Laurence Olivier, Joan Fontaine, Judith Anderson	Suspense	United Artists. Won 2 Academy Awards, one for Best Picture; another 9 nominations; #3 in Top Grossing Films
Remedy for Riches	Erle C. Kenton	Jean Hersholt, Dorothy Lovett, Edgar Kennedy	Drama	RKO
Remember the Night	Mitchell Leisen	Barbara Stanwyck, Fred MacMurray, Willard Robertson	Romantic drama	Paramount
The Return of Frank James	Fritz Lang	Henry Fonda, Gene Tierney, Jackie Cooper	Western	20th Century Fox
The Return of Wild Bill	Joseph H. Lewis	Wild Bill Elliott, Iris Meredith, Luana Walters	Western	Columbia
Rhythm of the Rio Grande	Albert Herman	Tex Ritter, Warner Richmond, Martin Garralaga	Western	Monogram
Rhythm on the River	Victor Schertzinger	Bing Crosby, Mary Martin, Basil Rathbone	Musical Comedy	Paramount. Nominated for Academy Award
Riders from Nowhere	Raymond K. Johnson	Jack Randall, Margaret Roach, Ernie Adams	Western	Monogram
Riders of Black Mountain	Sam Newfield	Tim McCoy, Rex Lease, Julian Rivero	Western	PRC
Riders of Pasco Basin	Ray Taylor	Johnny Mack Brown, Frances Robinson, Bob Baker	Western	Universal
Ride, Tenderfoot, Ride	Frank McDonald	Gene Autry, June Storey, Mary Lee	Western	Republic
Ridin' the Trail	Raymond K. Johnson	Fred Scott, Harry Harvey Sr., Jack Ingram	Western	Independent
River's End	Ray Enright	Dennis Morgan, Elizabeth Inglis, Steffi Duna	Drama	Warner Bros.
Road to Singapore	Victor Schertzinger	Bob Hope, Bing Crosby, Dorothy Lamour	Musical comedy	Paramount. First of series
Rocky Mountain Rangers	George Sherman	Robert Livingston, Rosella Towne, Raymond Hatton	Western	Republic
Roll Wagons Roll	Albert Herman	Tex Ritter, Nelson McDowell, Muriel Evans	Western	Monogram
Rollin' Home to Texas	Albert Herman	Tex Ritter, Eddie Dean, Jack Rutherford	Western	Monogram

== S–T ==
Title	Director	Cast	Genre	Notes
Safari	Edward H. Griffith	Madeleine Carroll, Douglas Fairbanks Jr., Muriel Angelus	Adventure	Paramount
The Sagebrush Family Trails West	Sam Newfield	Bobby Clack, Earle Hodgins, Forrest Taylor	Western	Independent
Sailor's Lady	Allan Dwan	Nancy Kelly, Jon Hall, Dana Andrews	Comedy	20th Century Fox
The Saint Takes Over	Jack Hively	George Sanders, Wendy Barrie, Jonathan Hale	Crime	RKO; The Saint series
The Saint's Double Trouble	Jack Hively	George Sanders, Helene Whitney, Jonathan Hale	Crime	RKO
San Francisco Docks	Arthur Lubin	Burgess Meredith, Barry Fitzgerald, Irene Hervey	Crime	Universal
Sandy Gets Her Man	Otis Garrett, Paul Gerard Smith	Baby Sandy, Stuart Erwin, Una Merkel	Comedy	Universal
Sandy Is a Lady	Charles Lamont	Baby Sandy, Eugene Pallette, Nan Grey	Comedy	Universal
Santa Fe Marshal	Lesley Selander	William Boyd, Russell Hayden, Bernadene Hayes	Western	Paramount
Santa Fe Trail	Michael Curtiz	Errol Flynn, Olivia de Havilland, Raymond Massey, Ronald Reagan	Western	Warner Bros.
Saps at Sea	Gordon Douglas	Laurel and Hardy, James Finlayson, Richard Cramer	Comedy	United Artists
Saturday's Children	Vincent Sherman	John Garfield, Anne Shirley, Claude Rains	Drama	Warner Bros.
Scatterbrain	Gus Meins	Judy Canova, Alan Mowbray, Ruth Donnelly	Comedy	Republic
The Sea Hawk	Michael Curtiz	Errol Flynn, Brenda Marshall, Claude Rains	Adventure	Warner Bros.; nominated for 4 Academy Awards
Second Chorus	H. C. Potter	Fred Astaire, Paulette Goddard, Artie Shaw	Musical comedy	Paramount; nominated for 2 Academy Awards
The Secret Seven	James Moore	Florence Rice, Barton MacLane, Bruce Bennett	Crime	Columbia
Secrets of a Model	Sam Newfield	Cheryl Walker, Harold Daniels, Phyllis Barry	Crime	Independent
Seven Sinners	Tay Garnett	Marlene Dietrich, John Wayne, Broderick Crawford	Adventure	Universal
Seventeen	Louis King	Betty Field, Jackie Cooper, Otto Kruger	Comedy	Paramount
She Couldn't Say No	William Clemens	Eve Arden, Roger Pryor, Cliff Edwards	Comedy	Warner Bros.
Shooting High	Alfred E. Green	Jane Withers, Gene Autry, Marjorie Weaver	Western musical	20th Century Fox
The Shop Around the Corner	Ernst Lubitsch	James Stewart, Margaret Sullavan, Frank Morgan	Romantic comedy	MGM
The Showdown	Howard Bretherton	William Boyd, Russell Hayden, Jan Clayton	Western	Paramount
Sing, Dance, Plenty Hot	Lew Landers	Ruth Terry, Johnny Downs, Mary Lee	Musical	Republic
Ski Patrol	Lew Landers	Luli Deste, Philip Dorn, Stanley Fields	War	Universal
Sky Bandits	Ralph Staub	James Newill, Louise Stanley, Dewey Robinson	Action	Monogram
Sky Murder	George Seitz	Walter Pidgeon, Kaaren Verne, Joyce Compton	Mystery	MGM; third in Nick Carter film series
Slightly Tempted	Lew Landers	Hugh Herbert, Peggy Moran, Johnny Downs	Comedy	Universal
So You Won't Talk	Edward Sedgwick	Joe E. Brown, Frances Robinson, Vivienne Osborne	Comedy	Columbia
Son of Ingagi	Richard C. Kahn	Zack Williams, Laura Bowman, Spencer Williams	Science fiction	Independent
The Son of Monte Cristo	Rowland V. Lee	Louis Hayward, Joan Bennett, George Sanders	Adventure	United Artists; nominated for Academy Award
Son of Roaring Dan	Ford Beebe	Johnny Mack Brown, Nell O'Day, Jean Brooks	Western	Universal
Son of the Navy	William Nigh	Jean Parker, James Dunn, Martin Spellman	Comedy	Monogram
Souls in Pawn	Melville Shyer	Kenne Duncan, Lloyd Ingraham, Symona Boniface	Drama	Independent
South of Pago Pago	Alfred E. Green	Jon Hall, Frances Farmer, Olympe Bradna	Adventure	United Artists
South of Suez	Lewis Seiler	George Brent, Brenda Marshall, Lee Patrick	Drama	Warner Bros.
South to Karanga	Harold D. Schuster	James Craig, Luli Deste, Charles Bickford	Adventure	Universal
Sporting Blood	S. Sylvan Simon	Robert Young, Maureen O'Sullivan, Lewis Stone	Drama	MGM
Spring Parade	Henry Koster	Deanna Durbin, Robert Cummings, Mischa Auer	Comedy, musical	Universal; nominated for 4 Academy Awards
Stage to Chino	Edward Killy	George O'Brien, Virginia Vale, Hobart Cavanaugh	Western	RKO
Stagecoach War	Lesley Selander	William Boyd, Russell Hayden, Harvey Stephens	Western	Paramount
Star Dust	Walter Lang	Linda Darnell, John Payne, Roland Young	Drama	20th Century Fox
Stolen Paradise	Louis J. Gasnier	Leon Janney, Eleanor Hunt, Esther Muir	Drama	Monogram
Strange Cargo	Frank Borzage	Clark Gable, Joan Crawford, Ian Hunter	Drama, romance	MGM
Stranger on the Third Floor	Boris Ingster	Peter Lorre, Charles Waldron, Margaret Tallichet	Film noir	RKO
Street of Memories	Shepard Traube (1907–1983)	Lynne Roberts, Guy Kibbee, John McGuire	Drama	20th Century Fox
Strike Up the Band	Busby Berkeley	Mickey Rooney, Judy Garland, Paul Whiteman and his Orchestra	Musical comedy	MGM; 3 Academy Award nominations, won 1
Susan and God	George Cukor	Joan Crawford, Fredric March, Ruth Hussey	Comedy	MGM
Swiss Family Robinson	Edward Ludwig	Thomas Mitchell, Edna Best, Freddie Bartholomew	Adventure	RKO; nominated for Academy Award
Take Me Back to Oklahoma	Albert Herman	Tex Ritter, Karl Hackett, Bob Wills	Western	Monogram
Tear Gas Squad	Terry O. Morse	John Payne, Dennis Morgan, Gloria Dickson	Crime	Warner Bros.
Texas Rangers Ride Again	James P. Hogan	Ellen Drew, John Howard, Akim Tamiroff	Western	Paramount
Texas Renegades	Sam Newfield	Tim McCoy, Nora Lane, Kenne Duncan	Western	PRC
Texas Stagecoach	Joseph H. Lewis	Charles Starrett, Iris Meredith, Bob Nolan	Western	Columbia
Texas Terrors	George Sherman	Don "Red" Barry, Julie Duncan, Arthur Loft	Western	Republic
That Gang of Mine	Joseph H. Lewis	Leo Gorcey, Clarence Muse, Milton Kibbee	Comedy	Monogram; 3rd of 22 East Side Kids films
They Drive by Night	Raoul Walsh	George Raft, Humphrey Bogart, Ida Lupino, Ann Sheridan	Drama	Warner Bros.
They Knew What They Wanted	Garson Kanin	Carole Lombard, Charles Laughton, William Gargan	Drama	RKO; nominated for Academy Award
The Thief of Bagdad	Michael Powell, Ludwig Berger, Tim Whelan	Conrad Veidt, Sabu, June Duprez, John Justin	Adventure	United Artists
Third Finger, Left Hand	Robert Z. Leonard	Myrna Loy, Melvyn Douglas, Raymond Walburn	Romantic comedy	MGM
This Thing Called Love	Alexander Hall	Rosalind Russell, Melvyn Douglas, Binnie Barnes	Romantic comedy	Columbia
Those Were the Days!	Theodore Reed	William Holden, Bonita Granville, Judith Barrett	Comedy	Paramount
Three Cheers for the Irish	Lloyd Bacon	Priscilla Lane, Dennis Morgan, Virginia Grey	Comedy	Warner Bros.
Three Faces West	Bernard Vorhaus	John Wayne, Sigrid Gurie, Charles Coburn	Drama	Republic
Three Men from Texas	Harry Sherman	William Boyd, Russell Hayden, Andy Clyde	Western	Paramount
Thundering Frontier	D. Ross Lederman	Charles Starrett, Iris Meredith, Carl Stockdale	Western	Columbia
'Til We Meet Again	Edmund Goulding	Merle Oberon, Pat O'Brien, Geraldine Fitzgerald	Drama	Warner Bros.; remake of One Way Passage (1932)
Tin Pan Alley	Walter Lang	Alice Faye, Betty Grable, Jack Oakie, John Payne	Musical	20th Century Fox; won Academy Award for musical score
Tom Brown's School Days	Robert Stevenson	Cedric Hardwicke, Freddy Bartholomew, Jimmy Lydon	Drama	RKO; based on 1857 novel
Tomboy	Robert F. McGowan	Marcia Mae Jones, Jackie Moran, Grant Withers	Drama	Monogram
Too Many Girls	George Abbott	Lucille Ball, Frances Langford, Desi Arnaz	Musical	RKO
Too Many Husbands	Wesley Ruggles	Jean Arthur, Fred MacMurray, Melvyn Douglas	Romantic comedy	Columbia; nominated for Academy Award
Torrid Zone	William Keighley	James Cagney, Ann Sheridan, Pat O'Brien	Adventure	Warner Bros.
The Trail Blazers	George Sherman	Robert Livingston, Bob Steele, Pauline Moore	Western	Republic
Trail of the Vigilantes	Allan Dwan	Franchot Tone, Warren William, Broderick Crawford	Western	Universal
Trailing Double Trouble	S. Roy Luby	Ray "Crash" Corrigan, Max Terhune, Roy Barcroft	Western	Monogram
Triple Justice	David Howard	George O'Brien, Virginia Vale, Peggy Shannon	Western	RKO
Tugboat Annie Sails Again	Lewis Seiler	Marjorie Rambeau, Jane Wyman, Ronald Reagan	Comedy	Warner Bros.; sequel to 1933 film
The Tulsa Kid	George Sherman	Don "Red" Barry, Luana Walters, Noah Beery	Western	Republic
Turnabout	Hal Roach	Adolphe Menjou, Carole Landis, Mary Astor	Comedy	United Artists
Two Girls on Broadway	S. Sylvan Simon	Lana Turner, Joan Blondell, George Murphy	Comedy	MGM
Typhoon	Louis King	Dorothy Lamour, Robert Preston, Lynne Overman	Adventure	Paramount; nominated for Academy Award

== U–Z ==
Title	Director	Cast	Genre	Notes
Under Texas Skies	George Sherman	Robert Livingston, Bob Steele, Lois Ranson	Western	Republic
Untamed	George Archainbaud	Ray Milland, Patricia Morison, Akim Tamiroff	Drama	Paramount
Up in the Air	Howard Bretherton	Marjorie Reynolds, Frankie Darrow, Lorna Gray	Comedy	Monogram
Victory	John Cromwell	Fredric March, Cedric Hardwicke, Betty Field	Adventure	Paramount
Vigil in the Night	George Stevens	Carole Lombard, Brian Aherne, Anne Shirley	Drama	RKO
Village Barn Dance	Frank McDonald	Richard Cromwell, George Barbier, Esther Dale	Comedy	Republic
The Villain Still Pursued Her	Edward F. Cline	Hugh Herbert, Anita Louise, Buster Keaton	Comedy	RKO
Virginia City	Michael Curtiz	Errol Flynn, Miriam Hopkins, Randolph Scott, Humphrey Bogart	Western	Warner Bros.
Viva Cisco Kid	Norman Foster	Cesar Romero, Jean Rogers, Stanley Fields	Western	20th Century Fox
Wagon Train	Edward Killy	Tim Holt, Martha O'Driscoll, Ray Whitley	Western	RKO
Wagons Westward	Lew Landers	Anita Louise, Chester Morris, Ona Munson	Western	Republic
Waterloo Bridge	Mervyn LeRoy	Vivien Leigh, Robert Taylor, Lucile Watson	Drama	MGM; nominated for 2 Academy Awards; remake of 1931 film
The Way of All Flesh	Louis King	Akim Tamiroff, Gladys George, Muriel Angelus	Drama	Paramount; remake of 1927 silent film
The Westerner	William Wyler	Gary Cooper, Walter Brennan, Doris Davenport	Western	United Artists; Academy Award for Brennan; 3 nominations
We Who Are Young	Harold S. Bucquet	Lana Turner, Gene Lockhart, Grant Mitchell	Drama	MGM
West of Abilene	Ralph Ceder	Charles Starrett, Bruce Bennett, George Cleveland	Western	Columbia
West of Carson City	Ray Taylor	Johnny Mack Brown, Peggy Moran, Bob Baker	Western	Universal
West of Pinto Basin	S. Roy Luby	Ray "Crash" Corrigan, Max Terhune, Gwen Gaze	Western	Monogram
When the Daltons Rode	George Marshall	Randolph Scott, Kay Francis, Brian Donlevy	Western	Universal
While Thousands Cheer	Leo C. Popkin	Kenny Washington, Mantan Moreland, Jeni Le Gon	Sports	Independent
Who Killed Aunt Maggie?	Arthur Lubin	Wendy Barrie, Mona Barrie, John Hubbard	Mystery	Republic
Wild Horse Range	Raymond K. Johnson	Jack Randall, Frank Yaconelli, Marin Sais	Western	Monogram
Wild Horse Valley	Ira Webb	Bob Steele, Lafe McKee, Ted Adams	Western	Independent
Wildcat Bus	Frank Woodruff	Fay Wray, Paul Guilfoyle, Don Costello	Drama	RKO
The Wildcat of Tucson	Lambert Hillyer	Wild Bill Elliott, Evelyn Young, Kenneth MacDonald	Western	Columbia
Wolf of New York	William C. McGann	Edmund Lowe, Rose Hobart, James Stephenson	Crime	Republic
Women in War	John H. Auer	Elsie Janis, Wendy Barrie, Patric Knowles	War drama	Republic; nominated for Academy Award
Women Without Names	Robert Florey	Ellen Drew, Fay Helm, Judith Barrett	Drama	Paramount
Wyoming	Richard Thorpe	Wallace Beery, Leo Carrillo, Ann Rutherford	Western	MGM
Yesterday's Heroes	Herbert I. Leeds	Jean Rogers, Robert Sterling, Kay Aldridge	Drama	20th Century Fox
You Can't Fool Your Wife	Ray McCarey	Lucille Ball, James Ellison, Virginia Vale	Comedy	RKO
You'll Find Out	David Butler	Kay Kyser, Helen Parrish, Ginny Simms, Peter Lorre, Boris Karloff	Comedy	RKO; nominated for Academy Award
Young Bill Hickok	Joseph Kane	Roy Rogers, Sally Payne, Julie Bishop	Western	Republic
Young Buffalo Bill	Joseph Kane	Roy Rogers, Pauline Moore, George "Gabby" Hayes	Western	Republic
Young People	Allan Dwan	Shirley Temple, Jack Oakie, Charlotte Greenwood	Drama	20th Century Fox
Young Tom Edison	Norman Taurog	Mickey Rooney, Fay Bainter, George Bancroft	Biography	MGM
Young as You Feel	Malcolm St. Clair	Jed Prouty, Spring Byington, Joan Valerie	Family	20th Century Fox
You're Not So Tough	Joe May	Billy Halop, Huntz Hall, Bobby Jordan, Nan Grey	Drama	Universal
Youth Will Be Served	Otto Brower	Jane Withers, Kent Taylor, Kay Aldridge	Musical	20th Century Fox
Yukon Flight	Ralph Staub	Louise Stanley, James Newill, Warren Hull	Western	Monogram
Zanzibar	Harold Schuster	Lola Lane, James Craig, Eduardo Ciannelli	Adventure	Universal

== Serials ==
Title	Director	Cast	Genre	Notes
Adventures of Red Ryder	William Witney, John English	Don "Red" Barry, Noah Beery, Tommy Cook	Western serial	Republic; based on comic strip Red Ryder
City of Lost Men	Harry Revier	William "Stage" Boyd, Kane Richmond, Claudia Dell	Science fiction	3rd feature version of 1935 serial The Lost City
Deadwood Dick	James W. Horne	Don Douglas, Lorna Gray, Harry Harvey, Marin Sais	Western	15-episode serial
The Green Archer	James W. Horne	Victor Jory, Iris Meredith	Serial	Columbia
The Green Hornet	Ford Beebe, Ray Taylor	Gordon Jones, Wade Boteler, Anne Nagel	Adventure Serial	Universal
Junior G-Men	Lewis D. Collins, Ray Taylor	Dead End Kids	Serial	Universal
King of the Royal Mounted	William Witney, John English	Allan Lane	Adventure Serial	Republic
The Lone Ranger	William Witney, John English	Lee Powell, Chief Thundercloud, Stanley Andrews	Western	Compilation of the 1938 serial
Mysterious Doctor Satan	William Witney, John English	Eduardo Ciannelli	Serial	Republic
Terry and the Pirates	James W. Horne	William Tracy, Sheila Darcy	Serial	Columbia; based on comic strip
Winners of the West	Ford Beebe, Ray Taylor	Dick Foran, Anne Nagel	Western serial	Universal

== Shorts ==
Title	Director	Cast	Genre	Notes
Americaner Shadchen	Edgar G. Ulmer	Leo Fuchs, Judith Abarbanel, Judel Dubinsky	Romance, Comedy	Independent; in Yiddish and English
Elmer's Candid Camera	Chuck Jones	Mel Blanc, Arthur Q. Bryan	Animated	
Eyes of the Navy		Charles B. Middleton	Short Documentary	Nominated for Academy Award
From Nurse to Worse	Jules White	The Three Stooges	Comedy Short	
Hired!	H.J. Handy (producer)		Short	Chevrolet promotion
How High Is Up?	Del Lord	The Three Stooges	Comedy Short	
Knock Knock	Walter Lantz (producer)		Animated Short	
The Milky Way	Rudolf Ising	Bernice Hansen	Animated Short	Won Academy Award
Mr. Duck Steps Out	Jack King		Animated Short	
No Census, No Feeling	Del Lord	The Three Stooges	Comedy Short	
Nutty But Nice	Jules White	The Three Stooges	Comedy Short	
Of Fox and Hounds	Tex Avery	Willoughby	Animated Short	
Patient Porky	Bob Clampett	Porky Pig	Animated Short	
Puss Gets the Boot	Hanna-Barbera Rudolf Ising	Lillian Randolph	Animated Short	Nominated for Academy Award
Quicker'n a Wink	George Sidney	Harold E. Edgerton	Short Documentary	Won Academy Award
Rockin' Thru the Rockies	Jules White	The Three Stooges	Comedy Short	

== See also ==
- 1940 in film
- 1940 in the United States
