= Prairie Schooners =

1940 film by Sam Nelson

- Theatrical poster for the film
- Directed by: Sam Nelson
- Screenplay by: Robert Lee Johnson; Fred Myton
- Produced by: Leon Barsha
- Starring: Bill Elliott; Evelyn Young; Dub Taylor
- Cinematography: George Meehan
- Edited by: Al Clark
- Production company: Columbia Pictures
- Release date: September 30, 1940 (US)
- Running time: 58 minutes
- Country: United States
- Language: English

Prairie Schooners is a 1940 American Western film directed by Sam Nelson, and stars Wild Bill Elliott, Evelyn Young, and Dub Taylor. It is the first in Columbia Pictures' series of 12 "Wild Bill Hickok" films, followed by Beyond the Sacramento.

== Cast ==
- Bill Elliott as Wild Bill Hickok
- Evelyn Young as Virginia Benton
- Dub Taylor as Cannonball
- Kenneth Harlan as Dalton Stull
- Ray Teal as Wolf Tanner
- Bob Burns as Jim Gibbs
- Netta Packer as Cora Gibbs
- Richard Fiske as Adams
- Edmund Cobb as Rusty
- Jim Thorpe as Chief Sanche

== Film series ==
Prairie Schooners is the first film in Columbia's series of 12 "Wild Bill Hickok" movies. They include:

1. Prairie Schooners (Sept 1940)
2. Beyond the Sacramento (Nov 1940)
3. The Wildcat of Tucson (Dec 1940)
4. Across the Sierras (Feb 1941)
5. North from the Lone Star (March 1941)
6. Hands Across the Rockies (June 1941)
7. King of Dodge City (Aug 1941)
8. Roaring Frontiers (Oct 1941)
9. The Lone Star Vigilantes (Jan 1942)
10. Bullets for Bandits (Feb 1942)
11. The Devil's Trail (May 1942)
12. Prairie Gunsmoke (July 1942)
