= Arthur Kingsley =

Arthur Kingsley may refer to:

- Arthur Kingsley Porter (1883–1933), American art historian and medievalist
- Arthur Kingsley, character in Babies for Sale, a 1940 American drama film
