= Overland with Kit Carson =

1939 film

- Theatrical release poster
- Directed by: Norman Deming; Sam Nelson
- Screenplay by: Joseph F. Poland (as Joseph Poland); Morgan Cox (as Morgan B. Cox); Ned Dandy
- Starring: Bill Elliott; Iris Meredith; Richard Fiske; Bobby Clack
- Cinematography: Benjamin H. Kline
- Edited by: Richard Fantl; Jerome Thoms (as Jerry Thoms)
- Color process: Black and white
- Production company: Columbia Pictures
- Distributed by: Columbia Pictures
- Release date: July 21, 1939
- Running time: 300 minutes (15 episodes)
- Country: United States
- Language: English

Overland with Kit Carson is a 1939 American Western serial film directed by Norman Deming and Sam Nelson and starring Bill Ellott, Iris Meredith, Richard Fiske and Bobby Clack.

== Plot ==
When Pegleg and his Black Raiders threaten the westward expansion of the United States, the government sends Kit Carson and David Brent to straighten things out.

== Cast ==
- Bill Elliott as Kit Carson
- Iris Meredith as Carmelita González
- Richard Fiske as Lieutenant David Brent
- Bobby Clack as Andy Gardner
- Trevor Bardette as Arthur Mitchell - Trapper
- LeRoy Mason as John Baxter - Trapper
- Olin Francis Trapper Pierre
- James Craig as Tennessee - Trapper
- Francis Sayles as Dr. Parker
- Kenneth MacDonald as Winchester - Trapper
- Dick Curtis as Drake - Henchman
- Richard Botiller as Natchez - Henchman (as Richard Botiller)
- Hal Taliaferro as Jim Stewart
- Flo Campbell as Stewart
- John Tyrrell as Captain Gilbert (Chs. 8-10)
- Francisco Marán as Don José Gonzalez (as Francisco Moran)
- Hank Bell as 'Broken-Hand' Fitzpatrick (Ch. 1)
- Irene Herndon as Juanita [ch. 3]
- Ermie Adams as Thor - Black Raiders Blacksmith
- Stanley Brown as Tom Higgins - Henchman (Ch. 1)
- Art Mix as Bill Cooper - Henchman
- Jack Rockwell as Red - Henchman

== Production ==
Scenes from Overland with Kit Carson were used as stock footage for Blazing the Overland Trail.

== Chapter titles ==
1. Doomed Men
2. Condemned to Die
3. The Fight for Life
4. The Ride of Terror
5. The Path of Doom
6. Rendezvous with Death
7. The Killer-Stallion
8. The Devil's Nest
9. Blazing Peril
10. The Black Raiders
11. Foiled
12. The Warning
13. Terror in the Night
14. Crumbling Walls
15. Unmasked

_{Source:}
