= Evelyn Young =

American actress (1915–83)

- Young in The Three Stooges film Boobs in Arms (1940)
- Born: Evelyn Ebersis Young; November 17, 1915; Washington state, U.S.
- Died: February 14, 1983 (aged 67); Orange, California, U.S.
- Other names: Evelyn Jennings (1925); Evelyn Young Pisani (1971–83)
- Occupation: Film actress
- Years active: 1925, 1939–40
- Employer: Columbia Pictures (1939–40)
- Known for: Prairie Schooners (1940); The Wildcat of Tucson (1940); Boobs in Arms (1940); Girls of the Road (1940)
- Spouse: Nicholas Pisani (1971–83)

Evelyn Ebersis Young (November 17, 1915 – February 14, 1983) was an American film actress. In 1940, at the height of her career, she appeared in 9 feature films. She was the leading female actress in The Wildcat of Tucson and Prairie Schooners, playing alongside Wild Bill Elliott and Dub Taylor in a Wild Bill Hickok series.

Young is familiar to fans of The Three Stooges as the wife of jealous drill sergeant Richard Fiske in the film Boobs in Arms. Young appeared in five films with the Stooges.

== Acting career ==
In 1939, Young had an uncredited part in the Stooges' short film Three Sappy People. In 1940 she acted in nine feature films and five short films. Of the shorts, four more were with The Stooges, with Mrs. Dare in Boobs in Arms best noted and the only when credited in the titles. Young's theme in Boobs in Arms was summarized in her first long phrase: "I'm afraid my husband doesn't love me anymore!" The other short with Young's participation was The Spook Speaks with Buster Keaton.

In April 1940, The New York Times reported that Young was to receive a leading role in Babies for Sale. Young received lead roles in other Columbia films but that of Babies for Sale went to her friend Rochelle Hudson. The New York Times described Young as "a child star of fifteen years ago who was known as Evelyn Jennings". An Evelyn Jennings played her sole role of Agnes Jennings in the 1925 silent film The Overland Limited, exactly 15 years earlier.

Young played the character of Sadie among ten female "hobos" in the action film Girls of the Road. She was the lead actress in Prairie Schooners and The Wildcat of Tucson. Dorothy Andre was her stunt double in The Wildcat of Tucson.

On September 24, 1940 The New York Times published that Young had been terminated at Columbia Pictures. While the studio released movies with her participation until the very last day of December that year, this report coincides with the end of Young's acting career.

== Personal and vital events ==
Evelyn Ebersis Young was born November 17, 1915, in Washington state. Her mother's maiden name was Rhodes.

At the age of 56, on March 27, 1971, Young married Nicholas Pisani in Orange County, California. Violinist Nick Pisani, who had been a recording musician for Bing Crosby, Dean Martin, and Frank Sinatra, was born in 1907 and would survive his wife by nearly four years.

In 1972, Young commented to the Associated Press on the untimely death of her friend and fellow Columbia actress, Rochelle Hudson. Hudson had died from a heart attack at the age of 55.

Young died on February 14, 1983, in Orange, California, aged 67.

== Filmography ==
=== Movies ===
Year	Title	Role	Length	Credits	Series
1925, July	The Overland Limited	Agnes Jennings	Feature film	Credited as Evelyn Jennings	
1939, December	Three Sappy People	Receptionist	Short film	Uncredited	Stooges Short #43
1940, June	He Stayed for Breakfast	Secretary	Feature film	Credited	
1940, June	Nutty but Nice	Nurse	Short film	Uncredited	Stooges Short #47
1940, July	Girls of the Road	Sadie	Feature film	Credited	
1940, July	The Spook Speaks	Former romantic interest	Short film	Uncredited	Keaton Short #6
1940, August	From Nurse to Worse	Woman in office	Short film	Uncredited	Stooges Short #49
1940, August	The Secret Seven	Maid	Feature film	Uncredited	
1940, September	Glamour for Sale	Alice	Feature film	Uncredited	
1940, September	Prairie Schooners	Virginia Benton	Feature film	Female lead	Wild Bill Hickok
1940, October	No Census, No Feeling	Lady in the street	Short film	Uncredited	Stooges Short #50
1940, October	Nobody's Children	Nurse	Feature film	Uncredited	
1940, October	So You Won't Talk	Attractive looking lady	Feature film	Uncredited	
1940, November	The Lone Wolf Keeps a Date	Cashier	Feature film	Uncredited	Lone Wolf #6
1940, December	Boobs in Arms	Mrs. Dare	Short film	Credited	Stooges Short #52
1940, December	The Wildcat of Tucson	Vivian Barlow	Feature film	Female lead	Wild Bill Hickok

=== Television ===
Year	Title	Role	Show Type	Role Type	Series
1997, May	The Three Stooges Greatest Hits	Various roles	Television special	Posthumous	
2003, April	The Three Stooges 75th Anniversary Special	Various roles	Television special	Posthumous	
2015, May	Eureka!	Various roles	Documentary series	Posthumous	Hey Moe, Hey Dad! #3
2015, May	Slap Happy	Various roles	Documentary series	Posthumous	Hey Moe, Hey Dad! #4
