= Girls Under 21 =

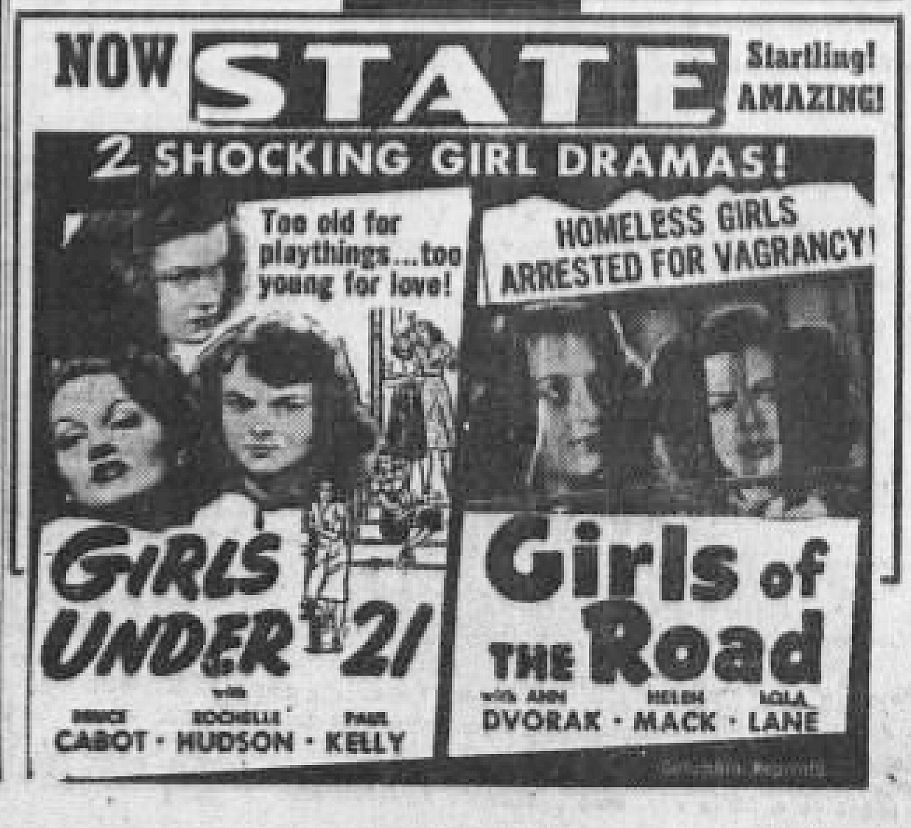
- 1951 newspaper advertisement for Girls Under 21 and Girls of the Road
- Directed by: Max Nosseck
- Written by: Jay Dratler; Fanya Foss
- Produced by: Ralph Cohn
- Starring: Bruce Cabot; Rochelle Hudson; Paul Kelly
- Cinematography: Barney McGill
- Edited by: Charles Nelson
- Music by: Morris Stoloff
- Distributed by: Columbia Pictures Corporation
- Release date: November 15, 1940
- Running time: 64 minutes
- Country: United States
- Language: English

Girls Under 21 is a 1940 American drama film directed by Max Nosseck, starring Bruce Cabot and Rochelle Hudson.

== Plot ==
Frances White from the slums, escapes the tenements by marrying rich gangster Smiley Ryan.

== Cast ==
- Bruce Cabot as Smiley Ryan
- Rochelle Hudson as Frances White Ryan
- Paul Kelly as Johnny Cane
- Tina Thayer as Jennie White
- Roberta Smith as Sloppy Krupnik
- Lois Verner as Fatso Cheruzzi
- Beryl Vaughan as Marge Dolan
- Joanne Tree as Gertie Dolan
- Debbie Ellis as Tessa Mangione
- William Edmunds as Tony Mangione
- John Dilson as Albert Carter, School Principal
- John Tyrrell as Rusty
