= Rio Grande (1949 film) =

1949 film

- Directed by: Norman Sheldon
- Written by: Norman Sheldon
- Produced by: Charles Lautem
- Starring: Sunset Carson; Lee Morgan; Bobby Clack
- Cinematography: Jack Specht
- Edited by: Hugh V. Jamieson
- Music by: Emil Velazco
- Production company: Lautem Productions
- Distributed by: Astor Pictures
- Release date: 1949
- Running time: 58 minutes
- Country: United States
- Language: English

Rio Grande is a 1949 American western film directed by Norman Sheldon and starring Sunset Carson, Lee Morgan and Bobby Clack. It was distributed by the low-budget company Astor Pictures. It was shot on location in San Ygnacio, Texas and at the Oliver Drake Ranch in California.

== Cast ==
- Sunset Carson as Sunset Carson
- Evohn Keyes as Jane Lanning
- Lee Morgan as Wes Caven
- Bobby Clack as Bruce Lanning
- Bobby Deats as Sam Elwood
- Henry Garcia as The Sheriff
- Walter Calmback Jr. as Frank Elwood
- Maria Louisa Marulanda as Singing / Dancing Girl

== Bibliography ==
- Hardy, Phil. The Western.
- Pitts, Michael R. Astor Pictures: A Filmography and History of the Reissue King, 1933-1965. McFarland, 2019. W. Morrow, 1983.
