= Babies for Sale =

1940 film by Charles Barton

- Film poster
- Directed by: Charles Barton
- Screenplay by: Robert Hardy Andrews (as Robert D. Andrews)
- Story by: Joseph Carole; Robert Chapin
- Starring: Rochelle Hudson; Glenn Ford; Miles Mander
- Cinematography: Benjamin H. Kline
- Edited by: Charles Nelson
- Color process: Black and white
- Production company: Columbia Pictures
- Distributed by: Columbia Pictures
- Release date: June 14, 1940
- Running time: 65 minutes
- Country: United States
- Language: English

Babies for Sale is a 1940 American film noir crime drama film directed by Charles Barton and starring Rochelle Hudson, Glenn Ford and Miles Mander.

== Plot ==
A newsman exposes a doctor running an adoption ring from a home for expectant mothers.

== Cast ==
- Rochelle Hudson as Ruth Williams
- Glenn Ford as Steve Burton / Oscar Hanson
- Miles Mander as Dr. Wallace Rankin
- Joe De Stefani as Dr. John Gaines (as Joseph Stefani)
- Isabel Jewell as Edith Drake
- Georgia Caine as Iris Talbot
- Eva Hyde as Gerda Honaker
- Selmer Jackson as Arthur Kingsley
- Mary Currier as Mrs. Thelma Kingsley
- Edwin Stanley as Mr. Edwards
- Douglas Wood as Dr. Ateshire
- John Qualen as Howard Anderson
- Helen Brown as Mrs. Howard Anderson

== Production notes ==
In April 1940 The New York Times reported that Evelyn Young was to receive the female lead in Babies for Sale. Young would soon receive other lead roles in Columbia films but that of Babies for Sale went to Rochelle Hudson.

== See also ==
- List of American films of 1940
