= Tell No Tales (film) =

1939 film

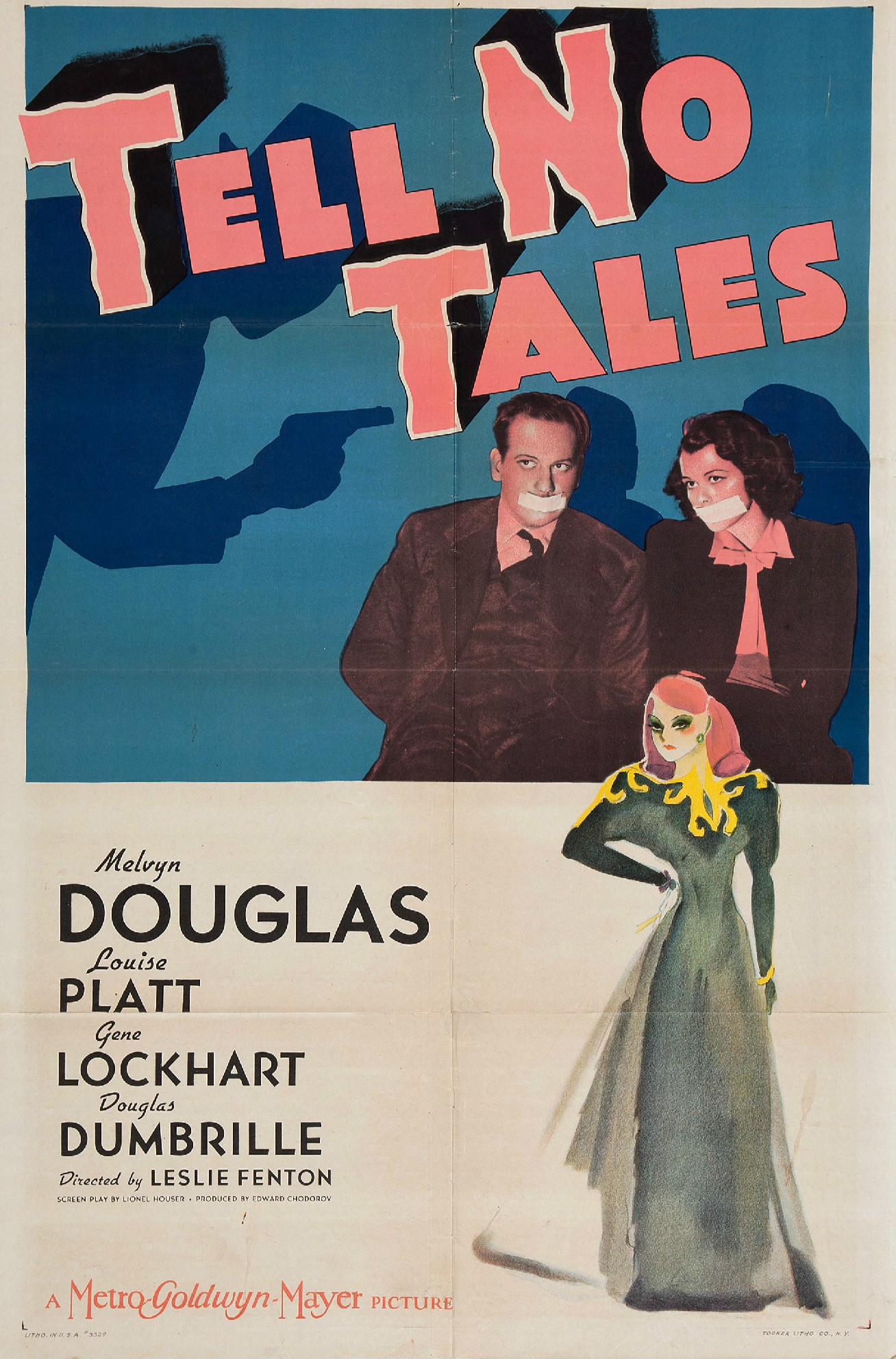
- Theatrical release poster
- Directed by: Leslie Fenton
- Screenplay by: Lionel Houser
- Story by: Pauline London; Alfred Taylor
- Produced by: Edward Chodorov
- Starring: Melvyn Douglas; Louise Platt; Gene Lockhart; Douglass Dumbrille
- Cinematography: Joseph Ruttenberg
- Edited by: W. Donn Hayes
- Music by: William Axt
- Production company: Metro-Goldwyn-Mayer
- Distributed by: Metro-Goldwyn-Mayer
- Release date: May 12, 1939
- Running time: 69 minutes
- Country: United States
- Language: English

Tell No Tales is a 1939 American crime film directed by Leslie Fenton, written by Lionel Houser, and starring Melvyn Douglas, Louise Platt, Gene Lockhart and Douglass Dumbrille. Fenton's feature-film directorial debut, it was released on May 12, 1939, by Metro-Goldwyn-Mayer.

== Plot ==
Michael Cassidy runs The Evening Guardian newspaper. However, publisher Matt Cooper sends Cassidy a telegram on its 75th birthday, informing him that he is shutting it down that very night. Cooper also owns The Record, a more lurid, scandal-filled paper, and he bought The Guardian solely to get rid of the competition. Cooper offers him any job he wants on The Record, but Cassidy turns him down. He abhors The Record, citing its shameful treatment of schoolteacher Ellen Frazier, a witness in a current kidnapping case.

When Cassidy pays his bar tab, the bartender notices his $100 bill is part of the kidnapping ransom money, the first bill to surface and the first clue in the case. Cassidy got the bill when the bartender cashed his check the night before. The bartender recalls getting it from jewelry store proprietor Charlie Daggett. Cassidy goes to Cooper and begs him to keep publishing The Guardian, offering him a story that will sell many newspapers for weeks. Cooper insists he print it in The Record or else he will turn him over to the police for withholding information. Cassidy flees.

Cassidy decides to track down the kidnappers. He sneaks in past a protective police cordon to see Ellen Frazier and, posing as a lawyer, persuades her to leave with him and identify the crooks if she can. She does not recognize Daggett, but he tells Cassidy who gave him the $100: a Mrs. Lovelake. Mrs. Lovelake's husband, a doctor, recalls receiving the bill from a patient with a knife wound, a black boxer named James Alley.

Ellen leaves while Cassidy is questioning Daggett, but later returns after he sees the Lovelakes. He convinces her to go to Davie Bryant at the newspaper, where she will hopefully be safe, but she is abducted at gunpoint on the street. Meanwhile, Cassidy goes to see Alley, but finds himself at his wake. It turns out he was run over by a car. His widow Ruby reluctantly admits she got the money from a friend of singer Lorna Travers, but does not know his name. Posing as a treasury agent, Cassidy gets the name from Travers, none other than Cooper. Cooper got the $100 as part of his winnings at Arno's gambling house. Arno is an old friend of Cassidy's; he points the reporter to two gangsters as the likely source of the bill. However, this information makes him realize his brother Phil must be mixed up in the kidnapping, so Arno reluctantly tips off the crooks that Cassidy is coming. Cassidy is easily captured. Phil Arno, who had laundered money for the criminals, gets a guilty conscience and helps Cassidy and Ellen escape death at the cost of his own life. Cassidy breaks the story for his paper. Cooper then decides not to close The Guardian after all.

== Cast ==
- Melvyn Douglas as Michael Cassidy
- Louise Platt as Ellen Frazier
- Gene Lockhart as Arno
- Douglass Dumbrille as Matt Cooper
- Florence George as Lorna Travers
- Halliwell Hobbes as Doctor Lovelake
- Zeffie Tilbury as Miss Mary
- Harlan Briggs as Davie Bryant
- Sara Haden as Miss Brendon
- Hobart Cavanaugh as Charlie Daggett
- Oscar O'Shea as Sam O'Neil
- Theresa Harris as Ruby
- Jean Fenwick as Mrs. Lovelake
- Esther Dale as Mrs. Haskins
- Joseph Crehan as Chalmers
- Tom Collins as Phil Arno
- Clayton Moore as Wilson (uncredited)

== Reception ==
Frank Nugent praised Fenton in The New York Times, writing, "A director who can take such a thin and unimaginative story ... and still cause it to walk along a knife-edge of suspense and melodramatic excitement, is doing a big favor for everybody concerned, notably, of course, for the author."
