= The Overland Limited (1925 film) =

1925 film

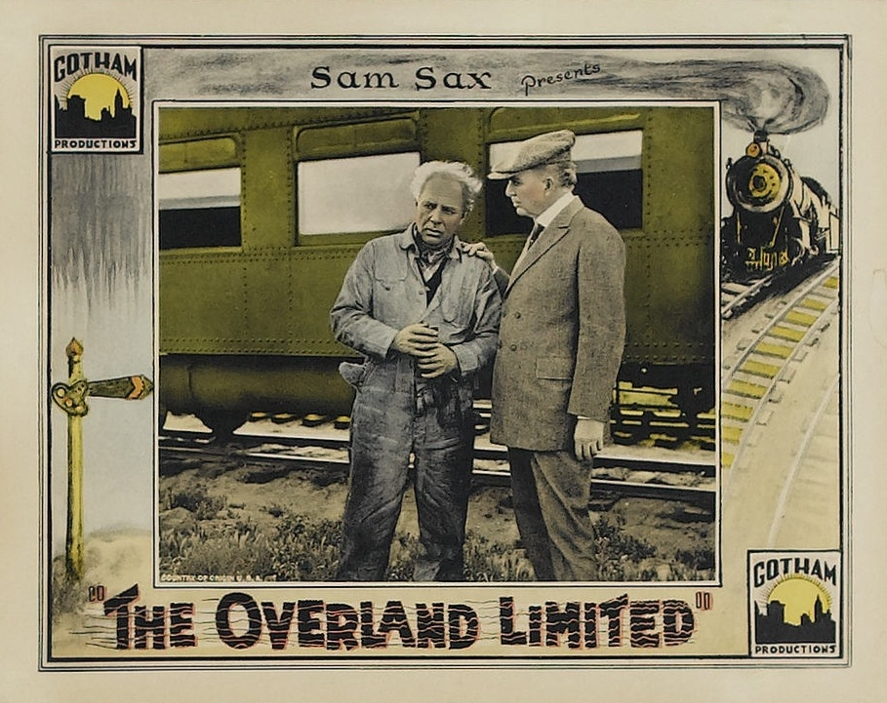
- Directed by: Frank O'Neill
- Written by: James J. Tynan
- Produced by: Sam Sax
- Cinematography: Jack MacKenzie
- Distributed by: Gotham Pictures
- Release date: July 14, 1925
- Running time: 6 reels
- Country: United States
- Language: Silent film (English intertitles)

The Overland Limited is a 1925 American silent film, directed by Frank O'Neill and produced by Sam Sax with cinematography by Jack MacKenzie. The story was written by James J. Tynan. The film was released July 14, 1925 in New York.

== Plot ==
The film starred Malcolm McGregor as an idealistic young railroad engineer who designs and builds a new railroad bridge, and Olive Borden as his love interest. The conflicting male lead is played by Ralph Lewis as the railway engineer who ultimately saves a trainload of passengers from the dangerous bridge.

The picture concludes with a model set of a steam locomotive breaking through the steel girders and plunging into the river.

== Cast ==
- Malcolm McGregor as David Barton (male lead)
- Olive Borden as Ruth Dent (female lead)
- Charles Hill Mailes as Schuyler Dent
- Evelyn Jennings as Agnes Jennings
- Alice Lake as Violet Colton
- Ralph Lewis as Ed Barton
- Charles Post as "One Round" Farrell
- Ethel Wales as Mrs. Barton
- Charles West as Bitterroot Jackson

== Release ==
The film's final scene was promoted with the tagline: "Like a steel comet, the mighty locomotive was hurled into the foaming waters below! The crashing climax of the greatest railroad photo-play ever made".

The film was released in the UK as The Mad Train and in Italy as Nastro d'Acciaio.
