= The Secret Seven (film) =

1940 film

- Directed by: James Moore
- Written by: Robert Tasker; Dean Jennings
- Produced by: Irving Briskin; Ralph Cohn
- Starring: Florence Rice; Barton MacLane; Bruce Bennett
- Cinematography: John Stumar
- Edited by: Charles Nelson
- Production company: Columbia Pictures
- Distributed by: Columbia Pictures
- Release date: August 15, 1940
- Running time: 62 minutes
- Country: United States
- Language: English

The Secret Seven is a 1940 American crime film directed by James Moore and starring Florence Rice, Barton MacLane and Bruce Bennett.

== Plot ==
After being released from prison where he has been serving time after a youthful mistake, Pat Norris sets out to bring down organized crime in the city headed by racketeer Sam O'Donnell. He receives assistance from Lola, the Chief of Police's daughter.

== Cast ==
- Florence Rice as Lola Hobbs
- Barton MacLane as Sam O'Donnell
- Bruce Bennett as Pat Norris
- Joseph Crehan as Police Chief Hobbs
- Joe Downing as Lou Bodie
- Howard Hickman as Dr. Talbot
- Edward Van Sloan as Prof. Holtz
- Don Beddoe as Maj. Blinn
- P.J. Kelly as Prof. Cordet
- William Forrest as Brooks
- George Anderson as Bennett
- Danton Ferrero as De Soto
- Cy Schindell as Felton
- Duke York as Karpa
- John Tyrrell as Candy
- Jessie Perry as Mrs. Norris
- Eddie Laughton as Bishop
- John Dilson as Walter Carter
- George Magrill as Scarlotti
- Sam Ash as Adams
- George McKay as Golden
- Ivan Miller as Prison Warden
- Herb Vigran as Salesman
- Hugh Beaumont as Southern Racketeer
- Edmund Cobb as Policeman
- Eddie Acuff as Driver
- Edward Earle as Twine Company Manager
- Lester Dorr as Racketeer
- Raymond Bailey as Racketeer
- Evelyn Young as Holtz Maid

== Bibliography ==
- Dick, Bernard F. Columbia Pictures: Portrait of a Studio. University Press of Kentucky, 2015.
