= Forgotten Girls =

- Theatrical release poster
- Directed by: Phil Rosen
- Screenplay by: F. Hugh Herbert; Joseph Moncure March; George Beck
- Story by: Frank McDonald
- Produced by: Robert North
- Starring: Louise Platt; Donald Woods; Wynne Gibson; Robert Armstrong; Eduardo Ciannelli; Jack La Rue
- Cinematography: Ernest Miller
- Edited by: Ernest J. Nims
- Music by: Cy Feuer; Paul Sawtell
- Production company: Republic Pictures
- Distributed by: Republic Pictures
- Release date: March 15, 1940
- Running time: 68 minutes
- Country: United States
- Language: English

Forgotten Girls is a 1940 American crime film directed by Phil Rosen and written by F. Hugh Herbert, Joseph Moncure March and George Beck. The film stars Louise Platt, Donald Woods, Wynne Gibson, Robert Armstrong, Eduardo Ciannelli and Jack La Rue. The film was released on March 15, 1940, by Republic Pictures.

== Plot ==
Factory worker Judy Wingate financially supports her stepmother Frances, who is keeping company with Eddie Nolan, a gangster. Eddie makes a pass at Judy, who knocks him cold with a skillet. A furious Frances finds Eddie recovering, strikes him again and kills him. But it is Judy who is arrested, convicted and sent to prison for five years.

A reporter covering the trial, Dan Donahue, develops a romantic attraction to Judy, who finds prison bearable, at least being far from her wicked stepmother. A guilty conscience persuades Frances, however, to offer $10,000 from Judy's life insurance policy to mobsters Gorno and Mullins to break her out of jail.

All spirals downhill from there. Judy threatens to go to the police and tell all she knows. Mullins, angry with Frances, runs her down with a car. On her deathbed, Frances attempts to confess, but Gorno shoots her before she can speak. Donahue and the police, however, are able to get the better of the villains and clear Judy's name once and for all.

== Cast ==
- Louise Platt as Judy Wingate
- Donald Woods as Dan Donahue
- Wynne Gibson as Frances Wingate
- Robert Armstrong as Grover Mullins
- Eduardo Ciannelli as Gorno
- Jack La Rue as Eddie Nolan
- Barbara Pepper as Eve Abbott
- Charles D. Brown as Editor Linton
- Sarah Padden as Miss Donaldson
- Ann Baldwin as Jackie
