= The Wildcat of Tucson =

1940 American western film

- Directed by: Lambert Hillyer
- Screenplay by: Fred Myton
- Produced by: Leon Barsha
- Starring: Wild Bill Elliott; Evelyn Young
- Cinematography: George Meehan
- Edited by: Charles Nelson
- Production company: Columbia Pictures
- Release date: December 31, 1940 (US)
- Running time: 59 minutes
- Country: United States
- Language: English

The Wildcat of Tucson is a 1940 American Western film, directed by Lambert Hillyer and starring Bill Elliott as "Wild Bill" Hickok and Evelyn Young as Vivian Barlow. It is the third in Columbia Pictures' series of 12 "Wild Bill Hickok" films, followed by Across the Sierras.

The film was produced and released by Columbia Pictures. A feature film, its length is 59 minutes.
