= List of programs broadcast by Catchy Comedy =

The following is a list of programs on the television network Catchy Comedy. Some of the television series rights were produced and distributed by the CBS Media Ventures library.

== Current Programming ==
=== Current ===
- The Adventures of Ozzie and Harriet (February 15, 2026 – present)
- ALF (January 2, 2026 – present)
- All in the Family (March 27, 2023 – present)
- The Best of Groucho (January 3, 2026 – present)
- The Beverly Hillbillies (December 29, 2025 – present)
- The Bob Newhart Show (July 7, 2015 – present)
- The Brady Bunch (March 27, 2023 – present)
- Car 54, Where Are You? (January 4, 2025 – February 7, 2026; June 8, 2026 – present)
- The Carol Burnett Show (April 18, 2022 – present)
- Cheers (October 5, 2020 – present)
- The Danny Thomas Show (April 22, 2024 – present)
- The Dick Van Dyke Show (October 5, 2020 – present)
- The Donna Reed Show (February 20, 2015 – present)
- Family Affair (January 20, 2015 – present)
- Full House (March 27, 2023 – present)
- Get Smart (January 4, 2025 – present)
- Gilligan’s Island (May 26, 2025 – present)
- Gomer Pyle – USMC (February 14, 2026 – present)
- Happy Days (January 15 – October 25, 2024; May 26, 2025 – present)
- Here's Lucy (December 29, 2025 – present)
- Hogan's Heroes (September 12, 2026 – present)
- Hot in Cleveland (September 1, 2025 – present)
- I Love Lucy (February 24, 2015 – present)
- Laverne & Shirley (March 27, 2023 – October 25, 2024; May 26, 2025 – present)
- Love, American Style (February 15, 2026 – present)
- The Love Boat (November 30, 2020 – present)
- The Lost Honeymooners (October 5, 2020 – present)
- The Lucy–Desi Comedy Hour (January 4 – August 30, 2025; May 17, 2026 – present)
- The Lucy Show (February 28, 2015 – present)
- Mama's Family (March 27, 2023 – present)
- The Mary Tyler Moore Show (July 2, 2015 - present)
- Mayberry R.F.D. (February 15, 2026 – present)
- The Monkees (January 3, 2026 – present)
- My Three Sons (October 27, 2024 – present)
- Night Court (March 27, 2023 – present)
- The Odd Couple (November 30, 2020 – present)
- Our Miss Brooks (September 23, 2015 – present)
- Petticoat Junction (August 14, 2015 – March 24, 2023; December 29, 2025 – present)
- Rhoda (March 27, 2023 – May 23, 2025; February 15, 2026 – present)
- Sanford and Son (March 27, 2023 – present)
- Sledge Hammer! (January 4 – May 24, 2025; February 14, 2026 – present)
- Taxi (October 5, 2020 – present)
- That Girl (September 2, 2024 – present)

=== E/I ===
- Animal Outtakes
- Animal Rescue Classics
- Missing: Cold Cases

== Former ==
- 1968 Democratic National Convention (August 6, 2017)
- 21 Jump Street (December 18, 2015)
- The Abbott and Costello Show (March 10, 2015 – March 24, 2023)
- The Achievers (June 10, 2015)
- The Alfred Hitchcock Hour (April 29, 2016)
- The Andy Griffith Show (June 22, 2025)
- The Best of The Ed Sullivan Show (September 4, 2017 – May 23, 2025)
- Beverly Hills 90210
- Black Sheep Squadron (April 9, 2016)
- Bosom Buddies (May 18, 2020)
- Branded (June 22, 2015)
- Broken Arrow (July 6, 2015)
- Brooklyn Bridge (July 2, 2019)
- Burke's Law (February 3, 2015)
- Cannon (July 21, 2015)
- Celebrity Bowling (March 8, 2015)
- Colonel March of Scotland Yard (February 3, 2015)
- Combat! (June 5, 2015)
- Dark Shadows (May 13, 2015 – March 24, 2023)
- The Dick Cavett Show (February 2, 2016 – March 24, 2023)
- Through the Decades (September 2016 – March 24, 2023)
- Diff'rent Strokes (February 11, 2018)
- Disasters of the Century (June 11, 2015)
- The Doris Day Show (January 31, 2015)
- The Facts of Life (February 17, 2018)
- Family Law
- Ferris Bueller
- The Flintstones (May 21 and 22, 2022; July 22 and 23, 2023)
- The Flip Wilson Show
- The Flying Nun (May 26 – December 26, 2025)
- The Fugitive (May 20, 2015)
- Gidget (May 31 – August 30, 2025)
- Good Times (March 27, 2023 – December 26, 2025)
- Greatest Moments of the 20th Century (January 4, 2016)
- Greatest Sports Legends (June 26, 2015)
- The Greats (May 25, 2015)
- Hey Moe, Hey Dad!
- Hill Street Blues (January 16, 2016)
- Hollywood Remembers (May 3, 2016)
- Hollywood Rivals (April 8, 2016)
- The Honeymooners
- Honey West (February 6, 2015)
- Hunter (April 7, 2016)
- The Immortal
- The Invisible Man (February 5, 2015)
- The Jeffersons
- The Joan Rivers Show
- Kojak (January 23, 2016)
- Kung Fu (April 22, 2015)
- Lancer
- Looney Tunes and Merrie Melodies (April 20 and 21, 2024)
- Lords of the Mafia (January 13, 2016)
- The Loretta Young Show (August 12, 2015)
- Mannix
- The Many Loves of Dobie Gillis (February 16, 2015 – June 5, 2026)
- M*A*S*H (January 4 – August 30, 2025)
- Matt Houston (July 8, 2015)
- McCloud (March 12, 2016)
- McMillan and Wife (November 17, 2015)
- Melrose Place
- The Millionaire (January 15, 2015 – March 24, 2023)
- The Mod Squad (June 23, 2015) (as part of the "Fan-tastic" block)
- The Mothers-in-Law (January 19, 2015)
- Moviestar (June 4, 2015)
- Mr. Lucky (July 22, 2015)
- Naked City (March 17, 2015)
- Newhart (March 5, 2018 – December 27, 2025)
- One Step Beyond
- Perry Mason (September 21, 2015)
- Peter Gunn (April 3, 2015)
- Police Squad! (January 4 - May 17, 2025)
- Power Players (January 1, 2016)
- The Powers of Matthew Star (May 27, 2019)
- The Phil Silvers Show (January 28, 2015 – September 5, 2026)
- The Rat Patrol (May 25, 2015)
- Remington Steele (July 9 and 10, 2022)
- Ripley's Believe it or Not! (January 2, 2017 – 2019)
- The Rogues (March 16, 2015)
- Route 66 (February 7, 2015)
- The Royal Family
- The Saint (March 30, 2015)
- Square Pegs (September 6 – December 27, 2025)
- The Streets of San Francisco (May 11, 2017)
- Studio One (September 14, 2015)
- That's My Mama
- 12 O'Clock High (August 7, 2015)
- Unforgettable (June 29, 2019)
- The Untouchables (March 11, 2015)
- Vega$ (July 8, 2015)
- The Veil (July 2, 2019)
- When Things Were Rotten (January 4 – May 24, 2025)
- The White Shadow (April 6, 2016)
- The Young Indiana Jones Chronicles
