= Louise Platt =

American actress (1915–2003)

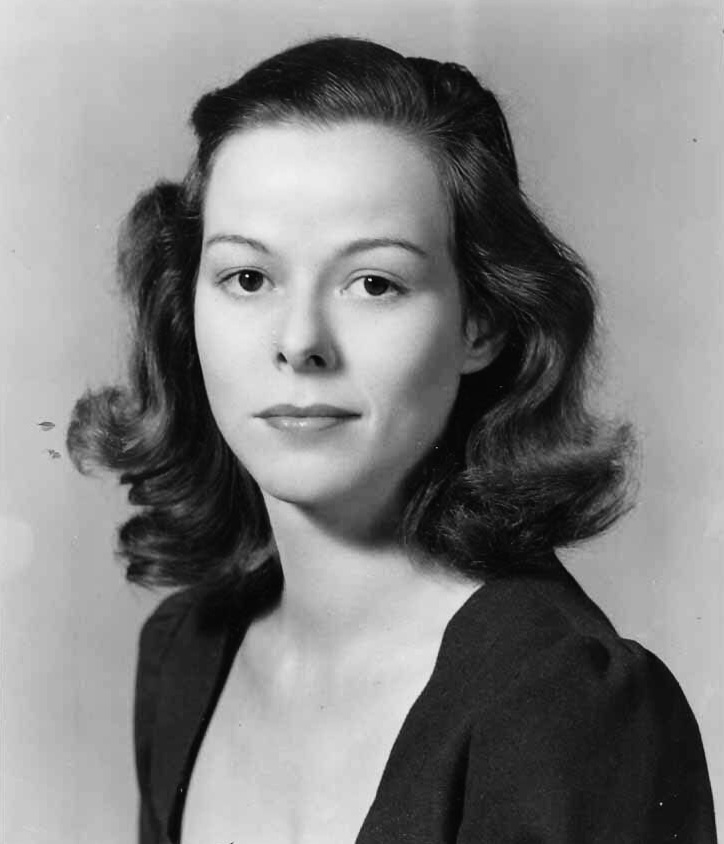
- Platt in 1941
- Born: August 3, 1915; Stamford, Connecticut, U.S.
- Died: September 6, 2003 (aged 88); Greenport, New York , U.S.
- Occupation: Actress
- Years active: 1936–1963
- Spouses: Jed Harris (m. 1939; div. 1941) Stanley Gould (m. 1950, died)
- Children: 2

Louise Platt (August 3, 1915 – September 6, 2003) was an American theater, film, and TV actress.

== Early years ==
Platt was born in Stamford, Connecticut, and grew up in Annapolis, Maryland. Her father was a dental surgeon in the Navy.

== Career ==
Platt's first professional acting experience came in stock theater in Suffern, New York. She went on to act in stock productions "from Maine to Virginia to Minnesota". Her Broadway credits include The Traitor (1949), Anne of the Thousand Days (1948), Five Alarm Waltz (1941), In Clover (1937), Promise (1936), Spring Dance (1936), and A Room in Red and White (1936).

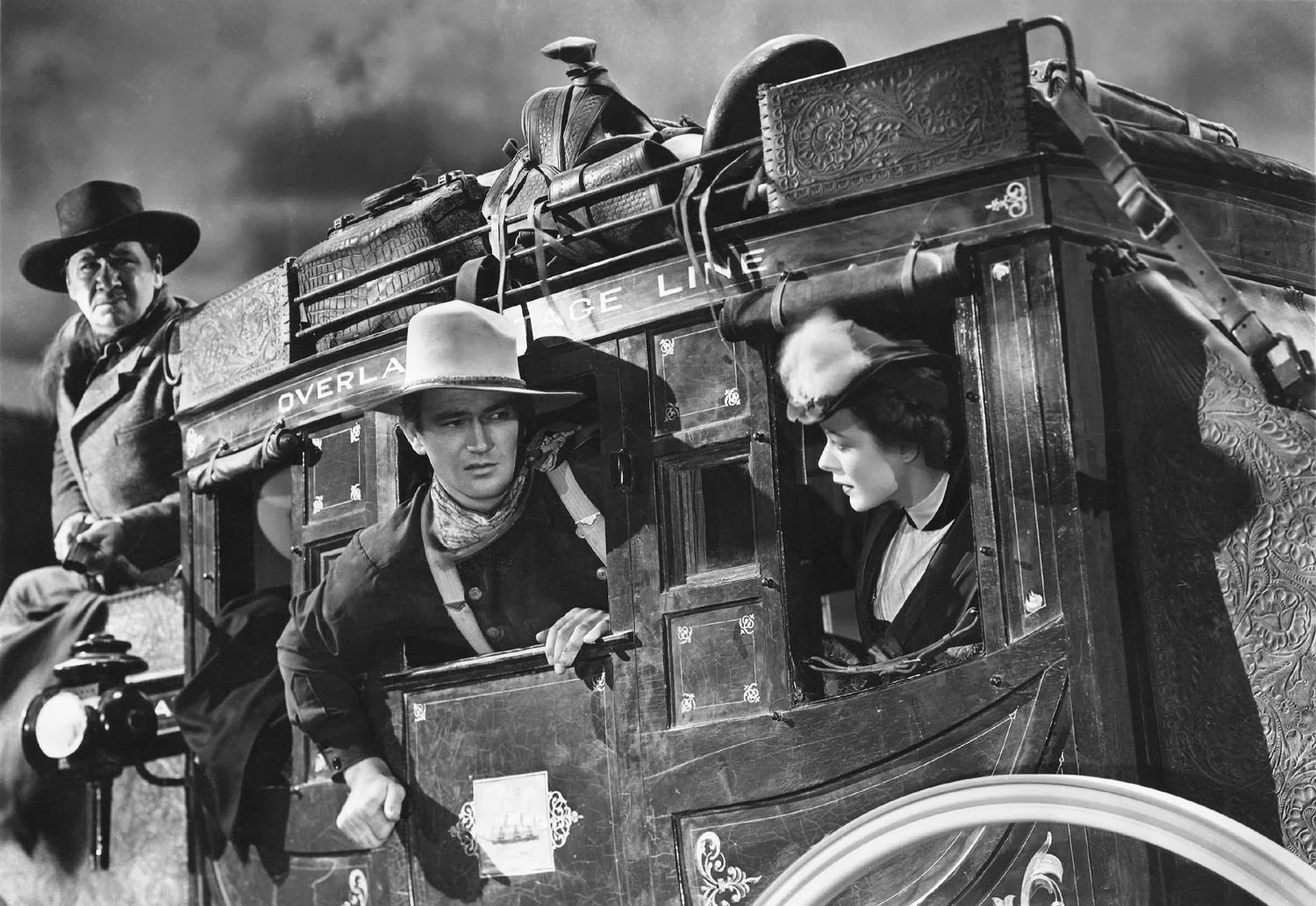
George Bancroft, John Wayne and Louise Platt in Stagecoach (1939)

Platt is best remembered for her role as the officer's pregnant wife in John Ford's Stagecoach (1939). After two years on Broadway, she came to Hollywood in 1938. She returned to the New York stage in 1942 after acting in a half-dozen movies. She worked with Rex Harrison in Anne of the Thousand Days on Broadway in 1948 and in the 1950s played a variety of roles on television, including two appearances on Alfred Hitchcock Presents and a recurring role as Ruth Holden on The Guiding Light.

== Personal life ==
Platt was first married to theater director Jed Harris, who abused her. On August 25, 1950, she married director Stanley Gould in North Guilford, Connecticut. They remained together until his death. Each marriage produced a daughter.

== Death ==
On September 6, 2003, Platt died at a hospital in Greenport, New York, at age 88. The cause of her death was not disclosed.

== Filmography ==
Year	Title	Co-stars	Role	Notes
1938	I Met My Love Again	Joan Bennett, Henry Fonda	Brenda Wayne	
1938	Spawn of the North	George Raft, Henry Fonda	Dian 'Di' Turlon	
1939	Stagecoach	Claire Trevor, John Wayne	Mrs. Lucy Mallory	
1939	Tell No Tales	Melvyn Douglas	Ellen Frazier	
1940	Forgotten Girls	Robert Armstrong	Judy Wingate	
1940	Captain Caution	Victor Mature	Corunna Dorman	
1942	Street of Chance	Burgess Meredith, Claire Trevor	Virginia Thompson	
1957	Alfred Hitchcock Presents	John Baragrey, Georgann Johnson	Marsha Hendricks	Season 2 Episode 23: "One for the Road"
1958	Alfred Hitchcock Presents	Keenan Wynn, Doreen Lang	Ethel Botibol	Season 3 Episode 35: "Dip in the Pool"
