= Bobby Clack (actor) =

American actor

Bobby Clack (January 3, 1926 – April 3, 1986) was an American film actor during the Western B-movies era. Sometimes he is credited as Bobby Clark or Dusty Dixon. His father, Arnold Clack, also was a film actor.

Clack was born in Spiro, Oklahoma, and died in Oregon at the age of 60.

== Selected filmography ==
- Trigger Smith (1939)
- Overland with Kit Carson (1939)
- The Sagebrush Family Trails West (1940)
- Rim of the Canyon (1949)
- Rio Grande (1949)
- Sons of New Mexico (1949)
- Beyond the Purple Hills (1950)
- Silver Canyon (1951)
- Rodeo King and the Senorita (1951)
- The Old West (1952)
- Barbed Wire (1952)

== Sources ==
- Bobby Clack at IMDb
