= Girls of the Road =

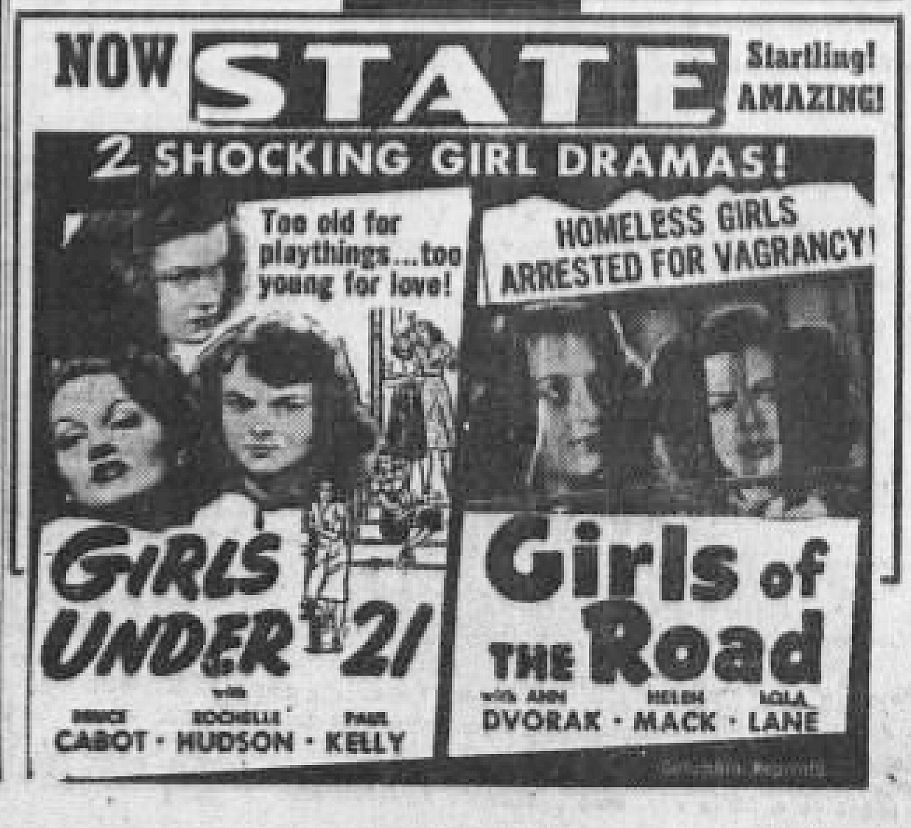
- 1951 newspaper advertisement for Girls Under 21 and Girls of the Road
- Directed by: Nick Grinde
- Written by: Robert Hardy Andrews
- Produced by: Wallace MacDonald
- Starring: Ann Dvorak; Helen Mack; Lola Lane; Ann Doran
- Cinematography: George Meehan
- Edited by: Charles Nelson
- Music by: Morris Stoloff
- Distributed by: Columbia Pictures
- Release date: 1940
- Running time: 61 minutes
- Country: United States
- Language: English

Girls of the Road is a 1940 American action film, based on an original screenplay by Robert Hardy Andrews, directed by Nick Grinde, and produced by Wallace MacDonald.

The main characters of the 61–minute Columbia Pictures feature film were ten female "hobos", portrayed by Ann Dvorak (Kay), Helen Mack (Mickey), Lola Lane (Ellie), Ann Doran (Jerry), Marjorie Cooley (Irene), Mary Field (Mae), Mary Booth (Edna), Madelon Grayson (Annie), Grace Lenard (Stella), and Evelyn Young (Sadie). Male actors in the films included Bruce Bennett (Officer Sullivan), Eddie Laughton (Footsy), and Don Beddoe (Sheriff).
