= The Sagebrush Family Trails West =

- Theatrical release poster
- Directed by: Sam Newfield
- Screenplay by: William Lively
- Produced by: Sigmund Neufeld
- Starring: Bobby Clack; Earle Hodgins; Nina Guilbert; Joyce Bryant; Minerva Urecal; Arch Hall Sr.
- Cinematography: Jack Greenhalgh
- Edited by: Holbrook N. Todd
- Production companies: Sigmund Neufeld Productions; Producers Pictures Corporation
- Distributed by: Producers Distributing Corporation; Butcher's Film Service (UK)
- Release date: January 17, 1940
- Running time: 62 minutes
- Country: United States
- Language: English

The Sagebrush Family Trails West is a 1940 American Western film directed by Sam Newfield and written by Fred Myton. The film stars Bobby Clack, Earle Hodgins, Nina Guilbert, Joyce Bryant, Minerva Urecal and Arch Hall Sr. The film was released on January 17, 1940, by Producers Distributing Corporation.

== Cast ==
- Bobby Clack as Bobby Sawyer (credited as Bobby Clark)
- Earle Hodgins as 'Doc' Sawyer
- Nina Guilbert as Minerva Sawyer
- Joyce Bryant as Nellie Sawyer
- Minerva Urecal as Widow Gail
- Arch Hall Sr. as Jim Barton
- Kenne Duncan as Bart Wallace
- Forrest Taylor as Len Gorman
- Carl Mathews as Zeke
- Wally West as Hank
- Byron Vance as Seth
- Augie Gomez as Bart
