= He Stayed for Breakfast =

1940 film by Alexander Hall

- Theatrical release poster
- Directed by: Alexander Hall
- Screenplay by: P. J. Wolfson; Michael Fessier; Ernest Vajda
- Based on: Ode to Liberty by Sidney Howard
- Produced by: B. P. Schulberg
- Starring: Loretta Young; Melvyn Douglas; Alan Marshal; Eugene Pallette; Una O'Connor
- Cinematography: Joseph Walker
- Edited by: Viola Lawrence
- Music by: Werner R. Heymann
- Production company: Columbia Pictures
- Distributed by: Columbia Pictures
- Release date: August 31, 1940 (New York City)
- Running time: 89 minutes
- Country: United States
- Language: English

He Stayed for Breakfast is a 1940 American romantic comedy film directed by Alexander Hall, based on the 1934 play Ode to Liberty by Sidney Howard, itself adapted from the French play Liberté provisoire by Michel Duran.

== Plot ==
In Paris, Marianne meets a communist named Paul who is trying to hide in her apartment to avoid the law. Interested in the man, she lets him take refuge in her place. Marianne soon finds out that Paul attempted to assassinate her banker husband, Maurice. Paul becomes trapped in the apartment due to guards surrounding the building.

Paul and Marianne slowly fall in love. Their newfound love becomes endangered when Paul is asked to surrender himself by the communist party he is involved with, but knowing the blame would be placed on Marianne, he refuses. Paul is then shortly after discovered by Marianne's husband, who turns him over to the police. To get the charges dropped, Marianne agrees to stay with her husband, but this does not last long, as Marianne, annoyed by her husband, flees to Paul's. The couple then head for the United States.

== Cast ==
- Loretta Young as Marianne Duval
- Melvyn Douglas as Paul Boliet
- Alan Marshal as Andre Dorlay
- Eugene Pallette as Maurice Duval
- Una O'Connor as Doreta
- Curt Bois as Comrade Tronavich
- Leonid Kinskey as Comrade Nicky
- Trevor Bradette as police lieutenant
- Grady Sutton as salesman
- Frank Sully as butcher
- Evelyn Young as secretary
- Ethelreda Leopold as secretary

Uncredited:

- Ernie Adams as Workman
- George Beranger as Maitre d'hotel
- William Castle as Policeman
- Vernon Dent as Chef
- Lenard Mudie as communist secretary
- William Newell as waiter
- Nestor Paiva as gendarme
- Harry Semels as comrade
- Charles Wagenheim as timid waiter
- Frederick Worlock as communist president

== Reception ==
Variety gave an indifferent review:

Lacking a sustained pace, and with several slow spots that might have been lifted by better direction, the picture will roll through the key spots as a bill topper for moderately satisfactory biz. ... With most of the action confined to the apartment, the picture has its weak moments with series of repetitious happenings that might not be so apparent with better direction that would have smacked over toppers to the gags and situations at hand. These rather dull passages prove a burden to the bright and sparkling comedy that is liberally sprinkled throughout and prevent the picture from reaching the laugh-hit class.

The Los Angeles Times stated, "It may lack the ideal smoothness of the Ernst Lubitsch production as a comedy: but its hilarities are immense."
