= Marked Men (1940 film) =

1940 film

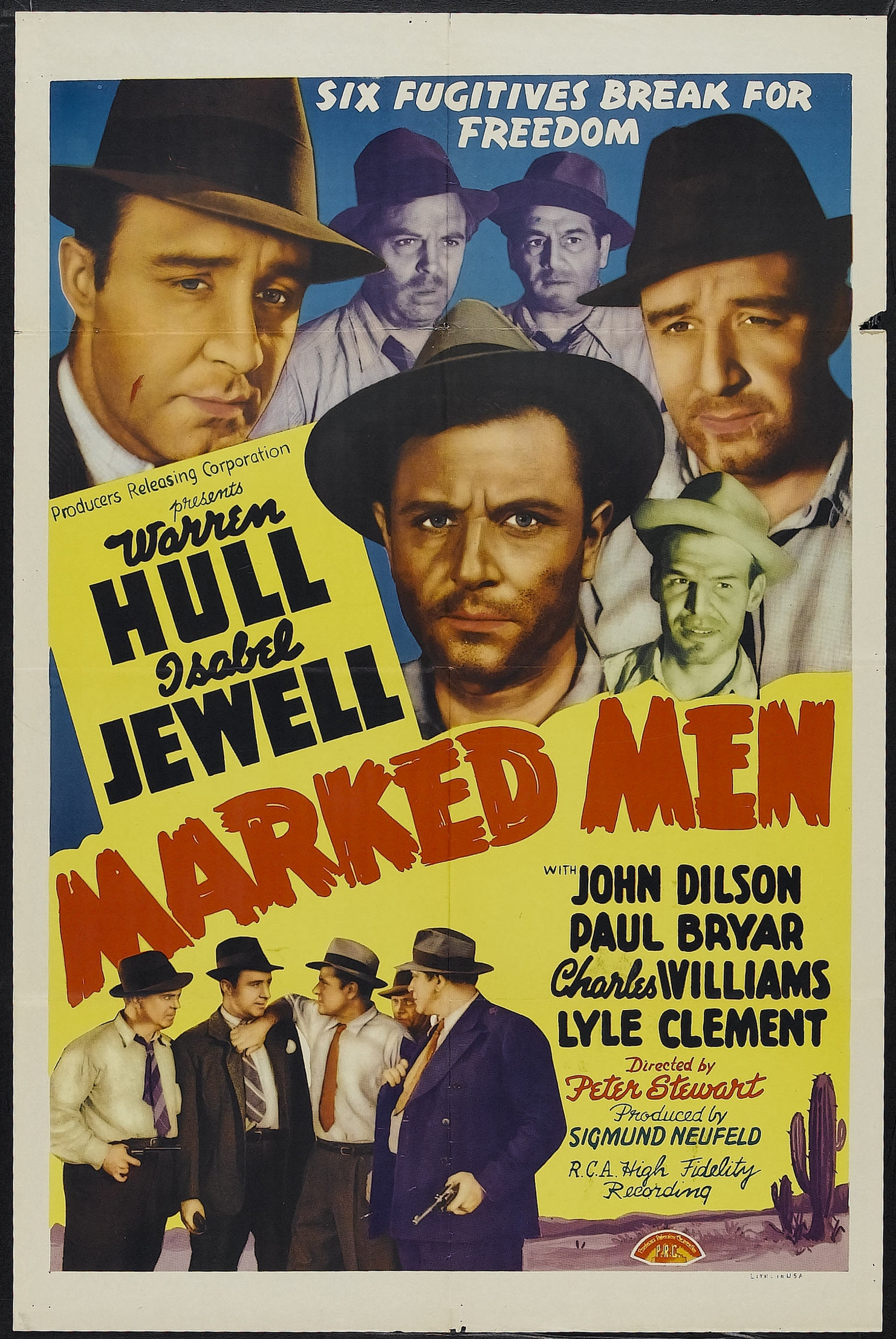
- Film poster
- Directed by: Sam Newfield
- Written by: Harold Greene (story); George Bricker (screenplay)
- Produced by: Sigmund Neufeld
- Cinematography: Jack Greenhalgh
- Edited by: Holbrook N. Todd
- Distributed by: Producers Releasing Corporation
- Release date: August 28, 1940
- Running time: 66 minutes
- Country: United States
- Language: English

Marked Men is a 1940 American film directed by Sam Newfield (using the pseudonym "Sherman Scott") for Producers Releasing Corporation.

The film is also known as Desert Escape in the USA (TV title).

== Plot ==
Bill Carver is a man wrongfully imprisoned after being framed by gangster Joe Mallon. In prison he is involuntarily involved in a jailbreak, also arranged by Mallon, who is serving in the same facility.

The attempted escape fails, and Mallon and his gang are soon caught by the police and put back behind bars—except for Bill, who escapes to the Arizona desert and picks up a stray dog he names Wolf. In the small town of Tempe, he meets Linda, who offers him work with her father, Dr James Prentiss Harkness. Bill stays with the doctor, but then there is another jailbreak at the prison, this time a successful one.

The escapees hold up a bank and make it look as though Bill was involved in the robbery. He has to clear his name of being part of the bank raid, and the only way he can do this is by catching the real perpetrators, Mallon and his men. He leaves his haven at the doctor's house and starts tracking the gang through the desert. Soon he finds Mallon and the others, who are lost and need Bill's help to find the border and cross into Mexico. He agrees to help them, seeing his chance of clearing his name, but the journey becomes a living hell for them all. Because of the lack of water and the dangers in the desert at night, only Bill, his dog and Mallon remain when they come close to the border, as during the trek he has brutally killed his henchmen for arguing with him when trying to quench their thirst from the dwindling supplies they are carrying. At this point Bill forces the weak and starving gangster to sign a written confession, proving his innocence.

As Mallon finishes signing the document, Dr. Harkness and his daughter arrive to rescue them. The gangster tries to kill Bill, but he is rescued by his dog. A free man, he returns to live in peace with the doctor and Linda, whom he marries.

== Cast ==
- Warren Hull as Bill Carver
- Isabel Jewell as Linda Harkness
- John Dilson as Dr James Prentiss Harkness
- Paul Bryar as Joe Mallon
- Charles Williams as Charlie Sloane
- Lyle Clement as Marshal Dan Tait
- Budd Buster as Mr Marvin - druggist
- Al St. John as Gimpy - a thug
- Eddie Fetherston as Marty - a thug
- Ted Erwin as Mike - a thug
- Art Miles as Blimp - a thug
- Grey Shadow as Wolf - the dog
