= Beyond the Sacramento =

1940 film by Lambert Hillyer

- Theatrical release poster
- Directed by: Lambert Hillyer
- Screenplay by: Luci Ward
- Produced by: Leon Barsha
- Starring: Wild Bill Elliott; Evelyn Keyes; Dub Taylor; John Dilson; Bradley Page; Frank LaRue
- Cinematography: George Meehan
- Edited by: James Sweeney
- Production company: Columbia Pictures
- Distributed by: Columbia Pictures
- Release date: November 11, 1940
- Running time: 58 minutes
- Country: United States
- Language: English

Beyond the Sacramento is a 1940 American Western film directed by Lambert Hillyer and written by Luci Ward. The film stars Wild Bill Elliott, Evelyn Keyes, Dub Taylor, John Dilson, Bradley Page and Frank LaRue. The film was released on November 11, 1940, by Columbia Pictures. It is the second in Columbia Pictures' series of 12 "Wild Bill Hickok" films, followed by The Wildcat of Tucson.

== Cast ==
- Wild Bill Elliott as Wild Bill Hickok
- Evelyn Keyes as Lynn Perry
- Dub Taylor as Cannonball
- John Dilson as Jason Perry
- Bradley Page as Cord Crowley
- Frank LaRue as Jeff Adams
- Norman Willis as Nelson
- Steve Clark as Curly
- Jack Rube Clifford as Sheriff
- Don Beddoe as Warden McKay
- Harry A. Bailey as Storekeeper
