= Charles Nelson (film editor) =

American film editor (1901–1997)

- Born: April 15, 1901
- Died: January 19, 1997 (aged 95)
- Occupation: Film editor

Charles Nelson (April 15, 1901, Grängesberg, Sweden – January 19, 1997, Los Angeles, California, US) was an American film editor. He won the Academy Award for Best Film Editing in 1956 for Picnic, and was nominated in 1946 for A Song to Remember, and in 1965 for Cat Ballou.

== Partial filmography ==
- Konga, the Wild Stallion (1939)
- Girls of the Road (1940)
- The Secret Seven (1940)
- Riders of the Badlands (1941)
- The Devil's Trail (1942)
- Sahara (1943)
- A Song to Remember (1945)
- Gilda (1946)
- Renegades (1946)
- The Doolins of Oklahoma (1949)
- Picnic (1955)
- Return to Warbow (1958)
- Cat Ballou (1965)
