= John Dilson =

American actor (1892–1944)

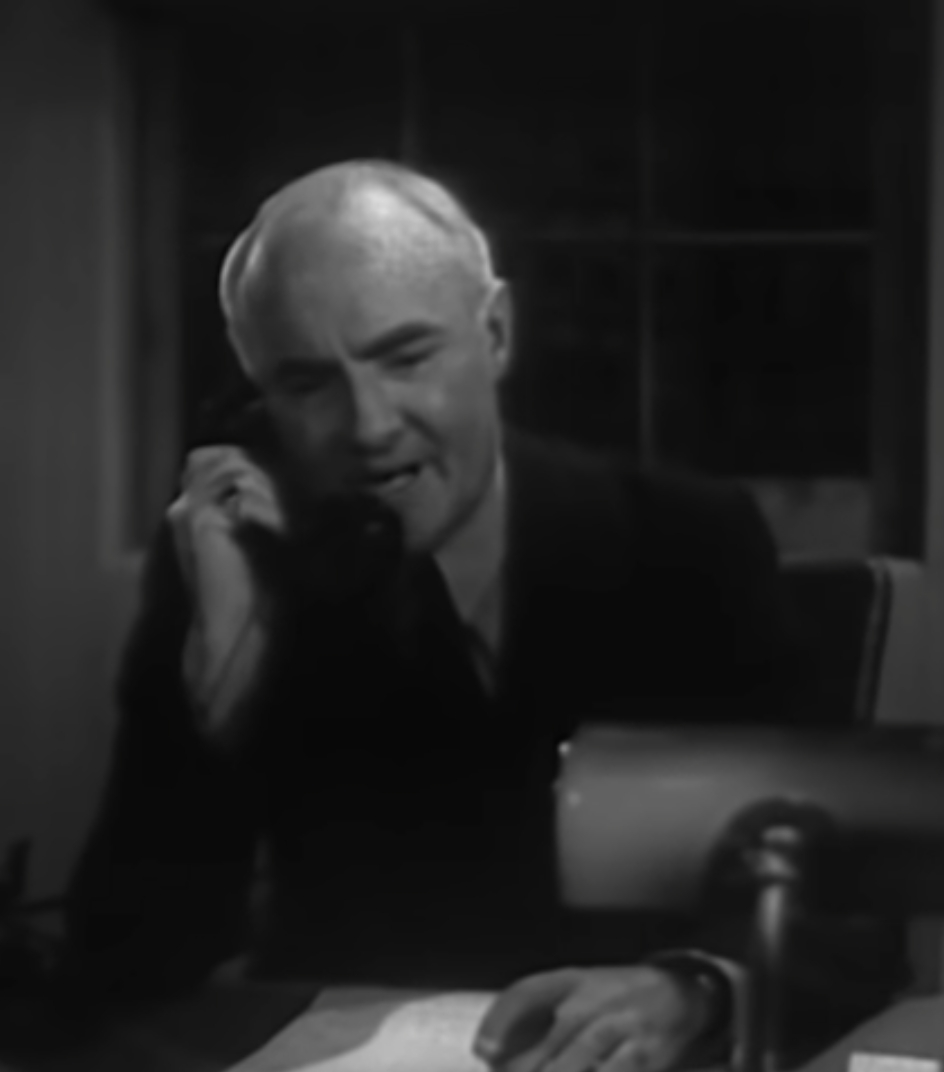
- Dilson in Gang Bullets (1938)
- Born: John Henry Dilson; February 18, 1892; Brooklyn, New York, U.S.
- Died: June 1, 1944 (aged 53); Camarillo, Ventura, California, U.S.
- Resting place: Holy Cross Cemetery, Culver City, California
- Occupation: Actor
- Years active: 1934–1944

John Henry Dilson (February 18, 1892 – June 3, 1944) was an American film and stage actor, and playwright. He appeared in more than 250 films between 1934 and 1944.

== Personal life ==
Dilson was married to Edith Constance Lee, with whom he had a son, John, Jr.

On June 3, 1944, following several months of failing health, Dilson died in Camarillo, California, of lobar pneumonia. He was survived by his wife and son, and his brother, actor Clyde Dilson. His remains are interred at Holy Cross Cemetery, Culver City.

== Selected filmography ==
- A Man's Game (1934)
- The Westerner (1934)
- The Girl Who Came Back (1935)
- Death from a Distance (1935)
- Cheers of the Crowd (1935)
- Robinson Crusoe of Clipper Island (1936)
- The Drag-Net (1936)
- The Public Pays (1936)
- Gentle Julia (1936)
- Three of a Kind (1936)
- Dick Tracy (1937)
- Gang Bullets (1938)
- Laugh It Off (1939)
- Racketeers of the Range (1939)
- Scandal Sheet (1939)
- A Woman Is the Judge (1939)
- Phantom of Chinatown (1940)
- Beyond the Sacramento (1940)
- The Man with Nine Lives (1940)
- Marked Men (1940)
- Hold That Woman! (1940)
- The Secret Seven (1940)
- Pioneers of the West (1940)
- Thundering Frontier (1940)
- Danger Ahead (1940)
- Dick Tracy vs. Crime, Inc. (1941)
- They Meet Again (1941)
- Father Steps Out (1941)
- Across the Sierras (1941)
- Madame Spy (1942)
- Wildcat (1942 film)
- Tramp, Tramp, Tramp (1942)
- So's Your Uncle (1943)
- She Has What It Takes (1943)
- Buffalo Bill (1944) (uncredited)
