= Across the Sierras =

1941 film

- Film poster
- Directed by: D. Ross Lederman
- Screenplay by: Paul Franklin
- Produced by: Leon Barsha
- Starring: Wild Bill Elliott; Richard Fiske; Luana Walters
- Cinematography: George Meehan
- Edited by: James Sweeney
- Production company: Columbia Pictures
- Distributed by: Columbia Pictures
- Release date: February 13, 1941
- Running time: 58 minutes
- Country: United States
- Language: English

Across the Sierras is a 1941 American Western film directed by D. Ross Lederman and starring Wild Bill Elliott, Richard Fiske and Luana Walters. It was produced and distributed by Columbia Pictures. It is the fourth in Columbia Pictures' series of 12 "Wild Bill Hickok" films, followed by North from the Lone Star.

== Plot ==
After six years in prison, Mitch Carew returns to Arroyo to seek his revenge on the two men who sent him to prison, shopkeeper Dan Woodworth and Wild Bill Hickok. Carew goads Woodworth into drawing a pistol allowing him to legally kill the elderly Woodworth in self-defence.

Meanwhile, Hickok rescues his ne'er do well friend Larry Armstrong from a lynch mob with the idea that both of them settle down on a ranch. Though Bill finds the love of an Eastern girl, the lure of adventure and the Code of the West lead the pair into trouble, gunplay and vengeance.

== Cast ==
- Bill Elliott as Wild Bill Hickok
- Richard Fiske as Larry Armstrong
- Luana Walters as Anne Woodworth
- Dub Taylor as Cannonball
- Dick Curtis as Mitch Carew
- LeRoy Mason as Stringer
- Ruth Robinson as Lu Woodworth
- John Dilson as Dan Woodworth
- Milton Kibbee as Sheriff (as Milt Kibbee)
- Ralph Peters as Hobie

== Bibliography ==
- Fetrow, Alan G. Feature Films, 1940-1949: a United States Filmography. McFarland, 1994.
