= List of Columbia Pictures films (1922–1939) =

The following is a list of feature films produced and distributed by the American studio Columbia Pictures from 1922, the year the company produced its first feature, until 1939. During these years Columbia emerged from Poverty Row to become one of the eight major studios of Hollywood.

== Key ==
^{(Lost)}	Considered to be a lost film.

== 1920s ==
=== 1922 ===
Release date	Title	Notes
August 20, 1922	More to Be Pitied Than Scorned	A Cohn-Brandt-Cohn (CBC) Film release. Both are lost.
December 15, 1922	Only a Shop Girl	A Cohn-Brandt-Cohn (CBC) Film release. Both are lost.

=== 1923 ===
Release date	Title	Notes
March 1, 1923	Temptation	A Cohn-Brandt-Cohn (CBC) Film release
April 16, 1923	Her Accidental Husband	A Cohn-Brandt-Cohn (CBC) Film release
May 27, 1923	Mary of the Movies	Co-produced with FBO as Cohn-Brandt-Cohn (CBC). Incomplete.
August 15, 1923	Yesterday's Wife	A Cohn-Brandt-Cohn (CBC) Film release. Lost Film
September 1, 1923	The Barefoot Boy	A Cohn-Brandt-Cohn (CBC) Film release. Both are incomplete.
September 15, 1923	Forgive and Forget	A Cohn-Brandt-Cohn (CBC) Film release. Both are incomplete.
October 25, 1923	The Marriage Market	A Cohn-Brandt-Cohn (CBC) Film release.
December 1, 1923	Innocence	The last film released under the Cohn-Brandt-Cohn (CBC) name. Lost Film

=== 1924 ===
Release date	Title	Notes
January 15, 1924	Discontented Husbands	First film released after the name change to "Columbia Pictures". Lost Film
March 1, 1924	Pal o' Mine	
May 23, 1924	Traffic in Hearts	Lost Film
June 1, 1924	The Midnight Express	
August 1, 1924	The Battling Fool	
August 1, 1924	A Fight for Honor	Lost Film
August 8, 1924	Racing for Life	Incomplete
August 15, 1924	The Foolish Virgin	Lost Film
September 1, 1924	The Fatal Mistake	Incomplete
September 15, 1924	The Price She Paid	A Celebrated Players Film Corporation of Wisconsin release
October 1, 1924	The Beautiful Sinner	Lost Film
November 1, 1924	Women First	Lost Film
December 1, 1924	One Glorious Night	
December 15, 1924	Tainted Money	

=== 1925 ===
Release date	Title	Notes
January 1, 1925	A Fool and His Money	Lost Film
February 1, 1925	The Fearless Lover	Lost Film
February 1, 1925	Who Cares	
February 8, 1925	Charley's Aunt	
March 1925	Justice of the Far North	fragment
June 1, 1925	An Enemy of Men	
June 16, 1925	After Business Hours	Incomplete
June 28, 1925	Fighting Youth	Lost Film
July 1, 1925	The Danger Signal	Incomplete
July 15, 1925	Speed Mad	Co-production with Perfection Pictures. Lost Film
August 1, 1925	The Unwritten Law	
August 15, 1925	The Price of Success	
August 23, 1925	Fighting the Flames	Incomplete. reel 5 missing
September 1, 1925	The New Champion	
September 15, 1925	Sealed Lips	Lost Film
October 1, 1925	The Great Sensation	
October 15, 1925	Steppin' Out	Incomplete
November 1, 1925	When Husbands Flirt	
November 1, 1925	A Fight to the Finish	
November 1, 1925	S.O.S. Perils of the Sea	
November 15, 1925	The Fate of a Flirt	
December 1, 1925	The Handsome Brute	Lost Film
December 12, 1925	The Lure of the Wild	

=== 1926 ===
Release date	Title	Notes
February 1, 1926	The Thrill Hunter	Incomplete
March 1, 1926	Ladies of Leisure	
August 15, 1926	The Belle of Broadway	
August 15, 1926	The Lone Wolf Returns	
September 20, 1926	The False Alarm	Lost Film
October 5, 1926	Sweet Rosie O'Grady	Lost Film
October 20, 1926	When the Wife's Away	
November 5, 1926	Obey the Law	
November 20, 1926	The Truthful Sex	Lost Film
December 5, 1926	The Better Way	
December 20, 1926	Remember	Incomplete

=== 1927 ===
Release date	Title	Notes
January 5, 1927	Stolen Pleasures	Lost Film
January 20, 1927	Wandering Girls	
February 5, 1927	The Wreck	Lost Film
February 20, 1927	The Bachelor's Baby	
March 5, 1927	The Price of Honor	
March 20, 1927	Birds of Prey	
April 5, 1927	Paying the Price	
April 20, 1927	Pleasure Before Business	
May 5, 1927	Poor Girls	
May 20, 1927	Rich Men's Sons	
June 5, 1927	The Romantic Age	
June 5, 1927	The Kid Sister	Lost Film
July 18, 1927	The Blood Ship	
July 20, 1927	For Ladies Only	
August 5, 1927	The Swell-Head	Lost Film
August 22, 1927	Alias the Lone Wolf	
September 3, 1927	Sally in Our Alley	Lost Film
September 15, 1927	The Clown	
September 15, 1927	By Whose Hand?	Lost Film
September 27, 1927	The Isle of Forgotten Women	Incomplete
October 21, 1927	The Tigress	
November 2, 1927	Stage Kisses	Lost Film
November 14, 1927	The Opening Night	
November 26, 1927	The Warning	
November 27, 1927	The College Hero	
December 20, 1927	The Siren	Lost Film

=== 1928 ===
Release date	Title	Notes
January 1, 1928	That Certain Thing	
January 13, 1928	The Wife's Relations	Lost Film
February 6, 1928	So This Is Love?	
February 13, 1928	Fashion Madness	Lost Film
February 18, 1928	A Woman's Way	Lost Film
March 2, 1928	The Sporting Age	Lost Film
March 14, 1928	The Matinee Idol	
March 26, 1928	The Desert Bride	
April 7, 1928	Broadway Daddies	Lost Film
April 19, 1928	After the Storm	
May 1, 1928	Golf Widows	
May 13, 1928	Modern Mothers	Lost Film
May 25, 1928	Name the Woman	Lost Film
June 19, 1928	The Way of the Strong	
June 30, 1928	Ransom	Lost Film
July 1, 1928	Beware of Blondes	Lost Film; Trailer Extant
July 13, 1928	Say It with Sables	Lost Film
July 15, 1928	Lady Raffles	
July 25, 1928	Virgin Lips	Lost Film
August 1, 1928	The Scarlet Lady	Synchronized Sound; Columbia's First Sound Feature
August 12, 1928	Court Martial	Part-Technicolor
August 23, 1928	Runaway Girls	Lost Film
September 3, 1928	The Street of Illusion	Lost Film
September 14, 1928	Sinner's Parade	Lost Film
October 15, 1928	Driftwood	Lost Film
October 25, 1928	Stool Pigeon	Status Unclear
October 31, 1928	The Power of the Press	Inducted into the National Film Registry in 2005
November 5, 1928	Nothing to Wear	Lost Film
November 12, 1928	Submarine	Synchronized Sound
November 19, 1928	The Apache	Lost Film
November 30, 1928	Restless Youth	Lost Film
December 8, 1928	Fashion Madness	Lost Film
December 11, 1928	The Sideshow	
December 22, 1928	Object: Alimony	Lost Film

=== 1929 ===
Release date	Title	Notes
January 2, 1929	The Faker	
February 18, 1929	The Lone Wolf's Daughter	Part-Talkie; Lost Film
February 24, 1929	Behind Closed Doors	Lost Film
March 4, 1929	The Younger Generation	Part-Talkie; Columbia's First Feature with Talking Sequences
March 10, 1929	Trial Marriage	Synchronized Score
March 18, 1929	The Eternal Woman	Lost Film
April 1, 1929	The Quitter	Columbia's Last Silent Feature.
April 11, 1929	The Donovan Affair	All-Talking; Columbia's First All-Talking Feature
May 13, 1929	Father and Son	Part-Talkie; Lost Film
May 20, 1929	The Bachelor Girl	Part-Talkie
June 5, 1929	The Flying Marine	Part-Talkie
June 17, 1929	The Fall of Eve	All-Talking All subsequent features were all talking
July 29, 1929	Light Fingers	Lost Film
August 5, 1929	The College Coquette	
September 14, 1929	Flight	
September 30, 1929	Hurricane	
November 10, 1929	Broadway Scandals	
November 13, 1929	Song of Love	
November 15, 1929	Acquitted	
December 1, 1929	Wall Street	Lost Film
December 15, 1929	The Broadway Hoofer	
December 26, 1929	Mexicali Rose	

== 1930s ==
=== 1930 ===
Release date	Title	Notes
January 15, 1930	The Melody Man	Part-Technicolor; Columbia's First Sound Feature With Color
January 29, 1930	Murder on the Roof	
February 14, 1930	Personality	
February 22, 1930	Vengeance	
March 3, 1930	Guilty?	
March 17, 1930	A Royal Romance	
March 26, 1930	Prince of Diamonds	
April 5, 1930	Ladies of Leisure	
April 25, 1930	Around the Corner	
April 30, 1930	Soldiers and Women	
May 10, 1930	Call of the West	
June 5, 1930	Temptation	
June 15, 1930	Sisters	
July 13, 1930	The Lone Rider	
July 16, 1930	Hell's Island	
August 1, 1930	Ladies Must Play	
August 15, 1930	Rain or Shine	
August 15, 1930	Africa Speaks!	Documentary
August 20, 1930	The Squealer	
August 26, 1930	The Last of the Lone Wolf	
August 29, 1930	For the Love o' Lil	
September 28, 1930	Shadow Ranch	
September 28, 1930	Sweethearts on Parade	
October 4, 1930	Atlantic	Distribution Only; Produced By British International Pictures
October 15, 1930	Men Without Law	Co-Production With Beverly Pictures Corporation and Sol Lesser Productions
October 19, 1930	Brothers	
November 15, 1930	Tol'able David	
November 24, 1930	Murder!	US Distribution Only; Produced by Wardour Films and British International Pictures
November 25, 1930	Madonna of the Streets	
November 28, 1930	The Dawn Trail	
December 25, 1930	Charley's Aunt	

=== 1931 ===
Release date	Title	Notes
January 1, 1931	The Lion and the Lamb	
January 3, 1931	The Criminal Code	
January 25, 1931	Desert Vengeance	
January 31, 1931	The Last Parade	
March 6, 1931	Ten Cents a Dance	
March 6, 1931	The Avenger	
March 20, 1931	The Lightning Flyer	
April 4, 1931	Dirigible	
April 17, 1931	Meet the Wife	
May 1, 1931	Subway Express	
May 3, 1931	The Flood	
May 10, 1931	The Texas Ranger	
May 15, 1931	Sky Raiders	
May 15, 1931	The Fighting Sheriff	
May 20, 1931	The Good Bad Girl	
June 16, 1931	Lover Come Back	
June 27, 1931	Arizona	
August 7, 1931	The Miracle Woman	
August 20, 1931	Fifty Fathoms Deep	
August 28, 1931	The Dreyfus Case	US Distribution Only; Produced by Wardour Films and British International Pictures
September 1, 1931	Branded	
September 8, 1931	The Pagan Lady	
September 20, 1931	Shanghaied Love	
September 30, 1931	A Dangerous Affair	
October 15, 1931	Border Law	
October 15, 1931	The One Way Trail	
October 31, 1931	Platinum Blonde	
November 1, 1931	Shotgun Pass	
November 19, 1931	The Guilty Generation	
November 21, 1931	The Deceiver	
November 25, 1931	The Fighting Marshal	
December 2, 1931	The Range Feud	
December 3, 1931	The Deadline	
December 10, 1931	Men in Her Life	
December 12, 1931	The Secret Witness	
December 18, 1931	Maker of Men	

=== 1932 ===
Release date	Title	Notes
January 4, 1932	Ridin' for Justice	
January 11, 1932	One Man Law	
January 15, 1932	Forbidden	
January 20, 1932	The Fighting Fool	
January 29, 1932	The Menace	
February 9, 1932	Three Wise Girls	
February 12, 1932	The Final Edition	
February 24, 1932	Texas Cyclone	
February 25, 1932	Behind the Mask	
March 5, 1932	South of the Rio Grande	
March 10, 1932	The Big Timer	
March 17, 1932	Love Affair	
March 25, 1932	Shopworn	
April 2, 1932	High Speed	
May 4, 1932	The Riding Tornado	
May 21, 1932	Attorney for the Defense	
June 4, 1932	No Greater Love	
June 8, 1932	Two-Fisted Law	
June 25, 1932	Hollywood Speaks	
July 6, 1932	By Whose Hand?	
July 15, 1932	Hello Trouble	
July 25, 1932	War Correspondent	
July 27, 1932	Daring Danger	
August 4, 1932	American Madness	
August 5, 1932	Cornered	
August 19, 1932	The Night Mayor	
August 26, 1932	McKenna of the Mounted	
August 27, 1932	The Night Club Lady	
August 28, 1932	Fighting for Justice	
August 31, 1932	The Last Man	
September 15, 1932	This Sporting Age	
September 16, 1932	The Western Code	
October 7, 1932	White Eagle	
October 15, 1932	Washington Merry-Go-Round	
October 15, 1932	Vanity Street	
October 25, 1932	Virtue	
November 4, 1932	Deception	
November 11, 1932	Speed Demon	
November 13, 1932	That's My Boy	
November 15, 1932	Man Against Woman	
November 18, 1932	Forbidden Trail	
November 25, 1932	No More Orchids	
December 19, 1932	End of the Trail	
December 24, 1932	As the Devil Commands	
December 30, 1932	Sundown Rider	

=== 1933 ===
Release date	Title	Notes
January 6, 1933	The Bitter Tea of General Yen	
January 15, 1933	Air Hostess	
January 20, 1933	Man of Action	
February 10, 1933	Treason	
February 10, 1933	State Trooper	
February 11, 1933	Child of Manhattan	
March 3, 1933	Silent Men	
March 4, 1933	Parole Girl	
March 10, 1933	Mussolini Speaks	Documentary
March 11, 1933	Obey the Law	
March 24, 1933	The California Trail	
March 29, 1933	Below the Sea	
April 4, 1933	Soldiers of the Storm	
April 10, 1933	The Circus Queen Murder	
April 14, 1933	The Whirlwind	
April 22, 1933	So This Is Africa	
April 24, 1933	Night of Terror	
April 30, 1933	The Thrill Hunter	
May 5, 1933	Unknown Valley	
May 25, 1933	When Strangers Marry	
May 26, 1933	Rusty Rides Alone	
June 5, 1933	Cocktail Hour	
June 9, 1933	Ann Carver's Profession	
June 15, 1933	Dangerous Crossroads	
June 24, 1933	What Price Innocence?	
June 30, 1933	The Woman I Stole	
July 10, 1933	The Wrecker	
September 13, 1933	Lady for a Day	theatrical distribution only; Nominee for the Academy Award for Best Picture, owned by Metro-Goldwyn-Mayer via United Artists
September 29, 1933	Brief Moment	
September 30, 1933	Police Car 17	
October 5, 1933	My Woman	
October 23, 1933	Fury of the Jungle	
October 25, 1933	Hold the Press	
October 27, 1933	Man's Castle	
November 10, 1933	King of the Wild Horses	
November 11, 1933	Fog	
November 18, 1933	Before Midnight	
November 28, 1933	East of Fifth Avenue	
November 28, 1933	Master of Men	
December 3, 1933	Shadows of Sing Sing	
December 13, 1933	Above the Clouds	
December 22, 1933	Straightaway	
December 26, 1933	Let's Fall in Love	
December 30, 1933	The Fighting Code	

=== 1934 ===
Release date	Title	Notes
January 31, 1934	The Ninth Guest	
February 5, 1934	Speed Wings	
February 23, 1934	It Happened One Night	Winner of the Academy Award for Best Picture Inducted into the National Film Registry in 1993
March 10, 1934	Social Register	
March 17, 1934	The Fighting Ranger	
March 24, 1934	Once to Every Woman	
March 24, 1934	The Man Trailer	
March 30, 1934	No Greater Glory	
April 6, 1934	Voice in the Night	
April 10, 1934	Whirlpool	
April 15, 1934	Sisters Under the Skin	
April 17, 1934	The Line-Up	
April 20, 1934	The Crime of Helen Stanley	
May 3, 1934	One Is Guilty	
May 11, 1934	Twentieth Century	Inducted into the National Film Registry in 2011
May 19, 1934	Hell Bent for Love	
June 5, 1934	Most Precious Thing in Life	
June 15, 1934	Black Moon	
June 16, 1934	A Man's Game	
June 16, 1934	The Hell Cat	
July 12, 1934	Whom the Gods Destroy	
July 15, 1934	The Defense Rests	
July 20, 1934	Blind Date	
July 25, 1934	Name the Woman	
July 31, 1934	Beyond the Law	
August 11, 1934	The Lady Is Willing	
August 30, 1934	The Party's Over	
September 11, 1934	Girl in Danger	
September 15, 1934	One Night of Love	Nominee for the Academy Award for Best Picture
September 25, 1934	Among the Missing	
October 8, 1934	That's Gratitude	
October 15, 1934	Lady by Choice	
October 25, 1934	Against the Law	
November 2, 1934	The Captain Hates the Sea	
November 8, 1934	The Prescott Kid	
November 10, 1934	I'll Fix It	
November 18, 1934	Men of the Night	
November 23, 1934	Jealousy	
December 1, 1934	Undercover Men	Canadian film co-production with Booth Productions
December 10, 1934	The Westerner	
December 10, 1934	Fugitive Lady	
December 15, 1934	Mills of the Gods	
December 27, 1934	White Lies	
December 27, 1934	Broadway Bill (Note: Owned by Paramount Pictures)	theatrical distribution only

=== 1935 ===
Release date	Title	Notes
January 8, 1935	Behind the Evidence	
January 15, 1935	The Best Man Wins	
January 21, 1935	Square Shooter	
February 15, 1935	Carnival	
February 15, 1935	Law Beyond the Range	
February 22, 1935	The Whole Town's Talking	
February 28, 1935	Death Flies East	
March 8, 1935	In Spite of Danger	
March 16, 1935	Let's Live Tonight	
March 18, 1935	The Revenge Rider	
March 20, 1935	I'll Love You Always	
April 6, 1935	The Unwelcome Stranger	
April 11, 1935	Eight Bells	
April 18, 1935	Fighting Shadows	
April 27, 1935	Party Wire	
May 4, 1935	Swellhead	
May 5, 1935	Men of the Hour	
May 7, 1935	Air Hawks	
May 18, 1935	The Awakening of Jim Burke	
May 25, 1935	Justice of the Range	
June 21, 1935	Unknown Woman	
June 28, 1935	Love Me Forever	
June 28, 1935	Riding Wild	
July 15, 1935	The Black Room	
July 16, 1935	Champagne for Breakfast	
July 26, 1935	After the Dance	
August 7, 1935	Western Frontier	
August 16, 1935	Together We Live	
August 25, 1935	Atlantic Adventure	
September 19, 1935	She Married Her Boss	
September 24, 1935	The Public Menace	
September 28, 1935	The Girl Friend	
October 8, 1935	She Couldn't Take It	Co-production with B.P. Schulberg Productions
October 20, 1935	Case of the Missing Man	
October 25, 1935	A Feather in Her Hat	
October 25, 1935	Grand Exit	
October 29, 1935	Western Courage	
November 2, 1935	Guard That Girl	
November 21, 1935	Crime and Punishment	Co-production with B.P. Schulberg Productions
November 24, 1935	Escape from Devil's Island	
November 25, 1935	One Way Ticket	Co-production with B.P. Schulberg Productions
November 30, 1935	Gallant Defender	
December 2, 1935	Super Speed	
December 6, 1935	Lawless Riders	
December 10, 1935	The Calling of Dan Matthews	
December 17, 1935	Heir to Trouble	
December 20, 1935	Too Tough to Kill	
December 30, 1935	If You Could Only Cook	
December 31, 1935	The Lone Wolf Returns	

=== 1936 ===
Release date	Title	Notes
January 2, 1936	Lucky Fugitives	co-production with Central Films and Kenneth J. Bishop Productions
January 4, 1936	Dangerous Intrigue	
January 17, 1936	The Mysterious Avenger	
February 6, 1936	You May Be Next!	
February 8, 1936	Hell-Ship Morgan	
February 21, 1936	Lady of Secrets	Co-production with B.P. Schulberg Productions
February 27, 1936	The Music Goes 'Round	
February 28, 1936	Don't Gamble with Love	
March 28, 1936	Heroes of the Range	
April 2, 1936	Pride of the Marines	
April 10, 1936	Panic on the Air	
April 12, 1936	Mr. Deeds Goes to Town	Nominee for the Academy Award for Best Picture
May 1, 1936	Devil's Squadron	
May 2, 1936	Roaming Lady	
May 6, 1936	The Mine with the Iron Door	
May 8, 1936	Avenging Waters	
May 10, 1936	Abdul the Damned	distribution only; British-made film; co-production with Alliance-Capital Productions
May 10, 1936	And So They Were Married	Co-production with B.P. Schulberg Productions
May 25, 1936	Counterfeit	Co-production with B.P. Schulberg Productions
May 26, 1936	The Cattle Thief	
May 28, 1936	The King Steps Out	
June 1, 1936	The Fugitive Sheriff	Co-production with Larry Darmour Productions
June 3, 1936	Secret Patrol	Co-production with Kenneth J. Bishop Productions and Central Films
June 15, 1936	Trapped by Television	
July 7, 1936	The Final Hour	
July 17, 1936	Shakedown	
July 23, 1936	Blackmailer	
August 1, 1936	Meet Nero Wolfe	Co-production with B.P. Schulberg Productions
August 15, 1936	Two-Fisted Gentleman	
September 9, 1936	They Met in a Taxi	
September 15, 1936	The Unknown Ranger	Co-production with Larry Darmour Productions
September 23, 1936	Alibi for Murder	
September 25, 1936	Craig's Wife	
September 25, 1936	The Man Who Lived Twice	
October 8, 1936	Adventure in Manhattan	
October 9, 1936	Code of the Range	
October 11, 1936	End of the Trail	
October 15, 1936	Tugboat Princess	co-production with Central Films and Kenneth J. Bishop Productions
October 27, 1936	Killer at Large	
November 1, 1936	Legion of Terror	
November 7, 1936	Come Closer, Folks	
November 12, 1936	Theodora Goes Wild	
November 14, 1936	North of Nome	
November 20, 1936	The Cowboy Star	
November 25, 1936	Pennies from Heaven	distribution only
November 27, 1936	Stampede	co-production with Central Films and Kenneth J. Bishop Productions
December 11, 1936	Rio Grande Ranger	
December 12, 1936	Dodge City Trail	
December 23, 1936	Lady from Nowhere	
December 24, 1936	More Than a Secretary	
December 31, 1936	Counterfeit Lady	

=== 1937 ===
Release date	Title	Notes
January 8, 1937	Find the Witness	
January 10, 1937	Ranger Courage	
January 17, 1937	Woman in Distress	
January 22, 1937	Westbound Mail	
January 24, 1937	The Devil's Playground	
February 7, 1937	The Beloved Vagabond	distribution only; British-made film; co-production with Toeplitz Productions Ltd.
February 12, 1937	When You're in Love	
March 3, 1937	Trapped	
March 9, 1937	Women of Glamour	
March 9, 1937	Trouble in Morocco	
March 11, 1937	Parole Racket	
March 25, 1937	Let's Get Married	
March 30, 1937	Racketeers in Exile	
April 5, 1937	Motor Madness	
April 6, 1937	Two Gun Law	
April 21, 1937	I Promise to Pay	
April 22, 1937	Thunder in the City	distribution only; British-made film; co-production with Atlantic Film Productions
April 30, 1937	Criminals of the Air	
May 2, 1937	The Frame-Up	
May 4, 1937	Speed to Spare	
May 11, 1937	Law of the Ranger	
May 14, 1937	Venus Makes Trouble	
May 25, 1937	The League of Frightened Men	
May 25, 1937	What Price Vengeance	distribution only; co-production with Central Films and Kenneth J. Bishop Productions; Distributed by Rialto Productions Corporation
May 30, 1937	Reckless Ranger	
June 15, 1937	Two-Fisted Sheriff	
June 21, 1937	Lucky Corrigan	distribution only; co-production with Central Films and Kenneth J. Bishop Productions; Distributed by Rialto Productions Corporation
June 23, 1937	Girls Can Play	
June 25, 1937	The Devil Is Driving	
June 30, 1937	A Fight to the Finish	
July 1, 1937	One Man Justice	
July 4, 1937	Roaring Timber	
July 15, 1937	It Can't Last Forever	
July 22, 1937	A Dangerous Adventure	
August 8, 1937	The Rangers Step In	
August 20, 1937	Outlaws of the Orient	
September 1, 1937	Lost Horizon	Nominee for the Academy Award for Best Picture Inducted into the National Film Registry in 2016
September 1, 1937	It's All Yours	
September 1, 1937	Jungle Menace	Serial film
September 7, 1937	It Happened in Hollywood	
September 9, 1937	Trapped by G-Men	
September 21, 1937	The Game That Kills	
October 7, 1937	Life Begins with Love	
October 14, 1937	Counsel for Crime	
October 21, 1937	The Awful Truth	Nominee for the Academy Award for Best Picture Inducted into the National Film Registry in 1996
November 3, 1937	Murder in Greenwich Village	
November 6, 1937	Hollywood Round-Up	
November 8, 1937	The Old Wyoming Trail	
November 17, 1937	I'll Take Romance	
November 22, 1937	Under Suspicion	
November 27, 1937	She Married an Artist	
December 1, 1937	Outlaws of the Prairie	
December 9, 1937	The Mysterious Pilot	Serial film
December 11, 1937	Paid to Dance	
December 13, 1937	Headin' East	
December 20, 1937	All American Sweetheart	
December 22, 1937	The Shadow	

=== 1938 ===
Release date	Title	Notes
January 17, 1938	Penitentiary	
January 23, 1938	Little Miss Roughneck	
February 5, 1938	No Time to Marry	
February 12, 1938	Cattle Raiders	
February 24, 1938	Who Killed Gail Preston?	
March 2, 1938	Women in Prison	
March 3, 1938	Start Cheering	
March 7, 1938	Rolling Caravans	
March 17, 1938	When G-Men Step In	
March 17, 1938	The Secret of Treasure Island	Serial film
April 1, 1938	Making the Headlines	
April 11, 1938	The Overland Express	
April 12, 1938	Call of the Rockies	
April 18, 1938	Wide Open Faces	
April 19, 1938	Flight Into Nowhere	
April 20, 1938	There's Always a Woman	
May 9, 1938	Extortion	
May 11, 1938	Woman Against the World	co-production with Central Films and Kenneth J. Bishop Productions
May 12, 1938	Law of the Plains	
May 25, 1938	The Lone Wolf in Paris	
June 15, 1938	Holiday	
June 20, 1938	Reformatory	co-production with Larry Darmour Productions
June 20, 1938	Stagecoach Days	
June 22, 1938	The Main Event	
June 27, 1938	Highway Patrol	
June 28, 1938	Squadron of Honor	
June 30, 1938	West of Cheyenne	
June 30, 1938	The Great Adventures of Wild Bill Hickok	Serial film
July 1, 1938	City Streets	
July 15, 1938	Pioneer Trail	
July 28, 1938	South of Arizona	
August 15, 1938	The Gladiator	
August 18, 1938	Convicted	co-production with Central Films and Kenneth J. Bishop Productions
August 25, 1938	I Am the Law	
August 31, 1938	Phantom Gold	
September 1, 1938	You Can't Take It With You	Winner of the Academy Award for Best Picture
September 8, 1938	The Colorado Trail	
September 15, 1938	Juvenile Court	
September 22, 1938	The Stranger from Arizona	
September 30, 1938	Girls' School	
October 3, 1938	West of the Santa Fe	
October 5, 1938	Crime Takes a Holiday	
October 12, 1938	Flight to Fame	
October 21, 1938	The Lady Objects	
October 22, 1938	The Spider's Web	Serial film
October 24, 1938	Law of the Texan	
November 2, 1938	In Early Arizona	
November 15, 1938	Adventure in Sahara	
November 30, 1938	Abused Confidence	US distribution only; produced in France by U.D.I.F.
November 30, 1938	Blondie (Note: Owned by Lionsgate)	distribution only
December 1, 1938	The Terror of Tiny Town	distribution only; co-production with Jed Buell Productions
December 8, 1938	Rio Grande	
December 9, 1938	The Little Adventuress	
December 15, 1938	California Frontier	
December 15, 1938	The Strange Case of Dr. Meade	
December 29, 1938	Smashing the Spy Ring	

=== 1939 ===
Release date	Title	Notes
1939	Men with Whips	US release of an Australian film
January 5, 1939	Homicide Bureau	
January 6, 1939	There's That Woman Again	
January 12, 1939	The Thundering West	
January 15, 1939	Farewell Waltz	US distribution only; produced in Germany by Boston-Films
January 19, 1939	Frontiers of '49	
January 24, 1939	North of Shanghai	
January 27, 1939	The Lone Wolf Spy Hunt	
January 28, 1939	Flying G-Men	Serial film
February 9, 1939	Texas Stampede	
February 22, 1939	My Son Is a Criminal	
March 8, 1939	Blondie Meets the Boss	distribution only
March 16, 1939	Lone Star Pioneers	
March 24, 1939	Whispering Enemies	
March 29, 1939	Let Us Live	
March 30, 1939	Romance of the Redwoods	
March 30, 1939	North of the Yukon	
April 3, 1939	The Lady and the Mob	
April 9, 1939	The Alibi	
April 12, 1939	First Offenders	
April 16, 1939	The Law Comes to Texas	
April 27, 1939	Spoilers of the Range	
May 4, 1939	Outside These Walls	
May 6, 1939	Mandrake the Magician	Serial film
May 11, 1939	Blind Alley	
May 15, 1939	Youth in Revolt	distribution only; France-made film; co-production with Transcontinental Films S.A.
May 22, 1939	Missing Daughters	
May 25, 1939	Only Angels Have Wings	Inducted into the National Film Registry in 1997
June 1, 1939	Trapped in the Sky	
June 5, 1939	Boys' School	
June 15, 1939	Western Caravans	
June 17, 1939	Murder Is News	distribution only; co-production with Central Films and Kenneth J. Bishop Productions
June 20, 1939	Good Girls Go to Paris	
June 20, 1939	Clouds Over Europe	distribution only; British-made film; co-production with Irving Asher Productions
July 15, 1939	The Man from Sundown	
July 20, 1939	Blondie Takes a Vacation	distribution only
July 21, 1939	Overland with Kit Carson	Serial film
July 28, 1939	Behind Prison Gates	
August 4, 1939	Coast Guard	
August 17, 1939	The Man They Could Not Hang	
August 22, 1939	Five Little Peppers and How They Grew	
August 23, 1939	Riders of Black River	
August 30, 1939	Konga, the Wild Stallion	
September 5, 1939	Golden Boy	
September 7, 1939	Hidden Power	
September 13, 1939	Outpost of the Mounties	
September 21, 1939	Those High Grey Walls	
September 21, 1939	Parents on Trial	
October 3, 1939	A Woman Is the Judge	
October 7, 1939	U-Boat 29	
October 12, 1939	Manhattan Shakedown	co-production with Central Films and Kenneth J. Bishop Productions
October 16, 1939	Scandal Sheet	
October 19, 1939	Mr. Smith Goes to Washington	Nominee for the Academy Award for Best Picture Inducted into the National Film Registry in 1989
October 24, 1939	Beware Spooks!	
November 1, 1939	Special Inspector	distribution only; co-production with Central Films and Kenneth J. Bishop Productions
November 8, 1939	Blondie Brings Up Baby	distribution only
November 23, 1939	The Amazing Mr. Williams	
December 2, 1939	The Stranger from Texas	
December 3, 1939	The Chess Player	
December 7, 1939	Fugitive at Large	
December 7, 1939	Taming of the West	
December 13, 1939	Two-Fisted Rangers	
December 19, 1939	Miracle on Main Street	distribution only; produced by Arcadia Pictures
December 28, 1939	My Son Is Guilty	

== Bibliography ==
- Blottner, Gene. Columbia Pictures Movie Series, 1926-1955: The Harry Cohn Years. McFarland, 2011.
- Dick, Bernard F. The Merchant Prince of Poverty Row: Harry Cohn of Columbia Pictures. University Press of Kentucky, 2014.
