= Stanley Andrews =

American actor (1891–1969)

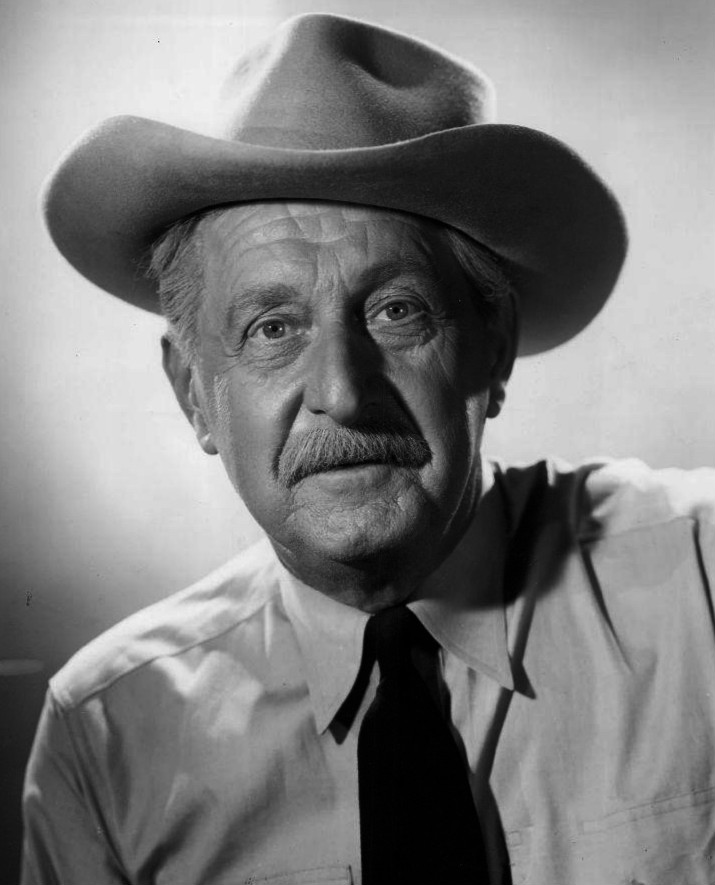
- Andrews as the "Old Ranger" (1953)
- Born: Stanley Martin Andrzejewski; August 28, 1891; Chicago, Illinois, U.S.
- Died: June 23, 1969 (aged 77); Los Angeles, California, U.S.
- Occupation: Actor
- Years active: 1931–1964

Stanley Martin Andrews (born Andrzejewski; August 28, 1891 – June 23, 1969) was an American actor perhaps best known as the voice of Daddy Warbucks on the radio program Little Orphan Annie and later as "The Old Ranger", the first host of the syndicated western anthology television series, Death Valley Days.

== Biography ==
=== Early life ===
Andrews was born in Chicago, Illinois, as Stanley Martin Andrzejewski.

=== Career ===
Andrews worked in stock theater early in his career. In an interview in 1957, he credited acting in Minneapolis in 1916 for giving him the confidence necessary "to embark on a successful career." He recalled that the troupe presented a different play each week for 52 weeks.

His first big role was on radio as Daddy Warbucks in the Little Orphan Annie series, where he starred from 1931 to 1936. He appeared in more than 250 movies, which included Mr. Deeds Goes to Town, Beau Geste, Mr. Smith Goes to Washington, The Ox-Bow Incident, It's a Great Life, State of the Union, The Lemon Drop Kid, Superman and the Mole Men (the very first theatrical Superman film). He had an uncredited role in the holiday classic It's a Wonderful Life, portraying Mr. Welch, a man who gets into a fight with James Stewart's main character. His final film role was in Cry Terror! in 1958.·

Besides his regular appearances on Death Valley Days, he appeared in seventeen episodes of The Range Rider, with Jock Mahoney and Dick Jones, eleven segments of Annie Oakley, ten episodes of The Gene Autry Show, seven episodes of The Lone Ranger, six appearances on Buffalo Bill, Jr., again with Dick Jones, and four times each on Tales of the Texas Rangers and the western aviation series, Sky King. Andrews appeared in the 1954 episode of Stories of the Century titled “Tom Horn”.

In the latter series with Kirby Grant and Gloria Winters, Andrews was cast as Jim Herrick in "Danger Point", and as Josh Bradford in "The Threatening Bomb" (both 1952) and as Old Dan Grable in "Golden Burro" and as Pop Benson in "Rustlers on Wheels" (both 1956). Andrews portrayed Dr. Henry Fulmer in the 1955 episode "Joey Saves the Day" of the NBC children's western series, Fury.

=== Death ===
In 1969, Andrews died in Los Angeles, California, aged 77.

== Selected filmography ==
- Roman Scandals (1933) - Official (uncredited) (film debut)
- Evelyn Prentice (1934) - Judge (uncredited)
- Wings in the Dark (1935) - Jack, an Official (uncredited)
- After Office Hours (1935) - Theatre Patron (uncredited)
- All the King's Horses (1935) - Count Batthy
- Transient Lady (1935) - Judge (uncredited)
- Times Square Lady (1935) - Doctor at Hockey Game (uncredited)
- Private Worlds (1935) - Dr. Barnes
- It Happened in New York (1935) - Plainclothesman (uncredited)
- Mississippi (1935) - Gambler with 4 Aces (uncredited)
- The Call of the Savage (1935, Serial) - Emperor Mena [Ch. 12]
- Stolen Harmony (1935) - Patrol Chief (uncredited)
- Goin' to Town (1935) - Engineer (uncredited)
- Hold 'Em Yale (1935) - Judge (uncredited)
- Alias Mary Dow (1935) - Detective (uncredited)
- People Will Talk (1935) - Willis McBride
- So Red the Rose (1935) - Cavalry Captain (uncredited)
- College Scandal (1935) - Jim (Fingerprint Man)
- Men Without Names (1935) - Jim, the Fingerprint Man
- The Murder Man (1935) - Police Commissioner (uncredited)
- Curly Top (1935) - Orphanage Trustee (uncredited)
- Woman Wanted (1935) - Jury Foreman (uncredited)
- She Gets Her Man (1935) - Kelly (uncredited)
- Orchids to You (1935) - Judge at Flower Show (uncredited)
- The Crusades (1935) - Amir (uncredited)
- Annapolis Farewell (1935) - Officer in Brigg's Office (uncredited)
- Here's to Romance (1935) - Father (uncredited)
- Anna Karenina (1935) - Husband - Third Couple (uncredited)
- Diamond Jim (1935) - Gambler (uncredited)
- Wanderer of the Wasteland (1935) - Sheriff Collinshaw
- The Big Broadcast of 1936 (1935) - Gordoni's Servant with Dog (uncredited)
- She Couldn't Take It (1935) - Attorney Wyndersham (uncredited)
- It's in the Air (1935) - Investigator (uncredited)
- Three Kids and a Queen (1935) - Federal Man (uncredited)
- Peter Ibbetson (1935) - Judge (uncredited)
- Escape from Devil's Island (1935) - Steve Harrington
- In Old Kentucky (1935) - Steward (uncredited)
- Nevada (1935) - Cawthorne
- Dangerous Intrigue (1936) - Mr. Mitchell
- You May Be Next (1936) - Naval Commander (uncredited)
- Dangerous Waters (1936) - Steamship Company Agent (uncredited)
- Drift Fence (1936) - Clay Jackson
- Desire (1936) - Customs Inspector (uncredited)
- Sutter's Gold (1936) - Senator Rand (uncredited)
- Mr. Deeds Goes to Town (1936) - James Cedar (uncredited)
- Florida Special (1936) - Armstrong, the Railroad President
- Counterfeit (1936) - Duffield (uncredited)
- Parole! (1936) - Williams (uncredited)
- White Fang (1936) - Police Sergeant Drake (uncredited)
- The Texas Rangers (1936) - First Higgins Henchman (uncredited)
- The Devil Is a Sissy (1936) - Doctor (uncredited)
- In His Steps (1936) - Broderick
- Alibi for Murder (1936) - Earl Quillan (uncredited)
- Craig's Wife (1936) - Police Officer Davis (uncredited)
- Wild Brian Kent (1936) - Tony Baxter
- The Plainsman (1936) - Officer (uncredited)
- Pennies from Heaven (1936) - Detective Stephens (uncredited)
- Let's Make a Million (1936) - Cliff Spaulding
- Happy Go Lucky (1936) - Capt. Matzdorf
- Find the Witness (1937) - District Attorney
- The Devil's Playground (1937) - Salvage Boat Commander
- She's Dangerous (1937) - Franklin Webb
- A Doctor's Diary (1937) - Dr. Wilson (uncredited)
- John Meade's Woman (1937) - Mr. Westley (uncredited)
- Nancy Steele Is Missing! (1937) - Warden - 1936 (uncredited)
- Her Husband Lies (1937) - District Attorney (uncredited)
- The Man Who Found Himself (1937) - Inspector Grey (uncredited)
- The Last Train from Madrid (1937) - Secret Service Man (uncredited)
- Born Reckless (1937) - Police Commissioner (uncredited)
- Easy Living (1937) - Police Captain Jackson (uncredited)
- High, Wide, and Handsome (1937) - Lem Moulton
- Blonde Trouble (1937) - Head Janitor (uncredited)
- Souls at Sea (1937) - First Mate (uncredited)
- The Man Who Cried Wolf (1937) - A Judge (uncredited)
- Double or Nothing (1937) - Police Lieutenant (uncredited)
- Big City (1937) - Detective Bennett (uncredited)
- Dangerously Yours (1937) - Houston, the Customs Inspector (uncredited)
- Madame X (1937) - Gendarme Testifying in Court (uncredited)
- Conquest (1937) - Prince Mirska (uncredited)
- Blossoms on Broadway (1937) - Chairman (uncredited)
- She Married an Artist (1937) - Editor (uncredited)
- Checkers (1937) - Deputy (uncredited)
- The Bad Man of Brimstone (1937) - Clergyman (uncredited)
- The Buccaneer (1938) - Collector of the Port
- Penitentiary (1938) - Prison Capt. Dorn (uncredited)
- The Lone Ranger (1938, Serial) - Capt. Smith - aka Col. Jeffries
- Forbidden Valley (1938) - Hoke Lanning
- When G-Men Step In (1938) - Preston
- Tip-Off Girls (1938) - Police Sergeant (uncredited)
- Cocoanut Grove (1938) - Truant Officer (uncredited)
- Alexander's Ragtime Band (1938) - Colonel
- Three Comrades (1938) - Officer Giving Toast (uncredited)
- Speed to Burn (1938) - Police Chief (uncredited)
- I'll Give a Million (1938) - Captain
- Spawn of the North (1938) - Partridge
- You Can't Take It With You (1938) - Attorney to Kirby at Arraignment (uncredited)
- Juvenile Court (1938) - Mayor (uncredited)
- Hold That Co-ed (1938) - Belcher - Committeeman (uncredited)
- The Mysterious Rider (1938) - William Bellounds
- Prairie Moon (1938) - Frank Welch
- Stablemates (1938) - Track Steward (uncredited)
- The Lady Objects (1938) - Baker
- Adventure in Sahara (1938) - Col. Rancreux
- Blondie (1938) - Mr. Hicks (uncredited)
- Road Demon (1938) - Chairman Colton (uncredited)
- Kentucky (1938) - Presiding Judge
- Shine On, Harvest Moon (1938) - Pa Jackson
- Homicide Bureau (1939) - Police Commissioner
- Pirates of the Skies (1939) - Maj. Smith
- Hotel Imperial (1939) - Col. Paloff (uncredited)
- First Offenders (1939) - District Attorney (uncredited)
- The Lady's from Kentucky (1939) - Doctor
- Union Pacific (1939) - Dr. Harkness (uncredited)
- Racketeers of the Range (1939) - Sam - Continental Packing Boss (uncredited)
- Andy Hardy Gets Spring Fever (1939) - James Willet (uncredited)
- Beau Geste (1939) - Maris
- Coast Guard (1939) - Comdr. Hooker
- Golden Boy (1939) - Driscoll - Fight Official (uncredited)
- Mr. Smith Goes to Washington (1939) - Senator Hodges (uncredited)
- The Housekeeper's Daughter (1939) - Police Captain (uncredited)
- Geronimo (1939) - Colombus Delano (uncredited)
- Joe and Ethel Turp Call on the President (1939) - George - Policeman (uncredited)
- Charlie McCarthy, Detective (1939) - Freight Captain (uncredited)
- Hi-Yo Silver (1940) - Captain Smith / Colonel Jeffries (archive footage)
- The Green Hornet (1940, Serial) - Police Commissioner [Chs. 1, 5, 8, 9, 13]
- The Man Who Wouldn't Talk (1940) - Colonel (uncredited)
- The Blue Bird (1940) - Wilhelm
- Convicted Woman (1940) - Prosecutor (uncredited)
- Little Old New York (1940) - Patrol Captain
- Strange Cargo (1940) - Constable (uncredited)
- Johnny Apollo (1940) - Welfare Secretary
- Maryland (1940) - Dr. John Trimble (uncredited)
- Brigham Young (1940) - Hyrum Smith
- Kit Carson (1940) - Larkin
- The Westerner (1940) - Sheriff (uncredited)
- Colorado (1940) - Colonel Gibbons (uncredited)
- King of the Royal Mounted (1940, Serial) - Tom Merritt Sr. [Ch. 1]
- So You Won't Talk (1940) - Press Foreman (uncredited)
- The Mark of Zorro (1940) - Commanding Officer (uncredited)
- The Son of Monte Cristo (1940) - Turnkey
- Play Girl (1941) - Joseph Shawhan
- Meet John Doe (1941) - Weston
- In Old Colorado (1941) - George Davidson
- Las Vegas Nights (1941) - Sheriff (uncredited)
- Dead Men Tell (1941) - Inspector Vesey (uncredited)
- Strange Alibi (1941) - Lieutenant-Detective Pagle
- Time Out for Rhythm (1941) - James Anderson
- Lady Scarface (1941) - Police Capt. L. Andrews (uncredited)
- Wild Geese Calling (1941) - Delaney
- Man at Large (1941) - FBI Chief Ed Ruby (uncredited)
- Borrowed Hero (1941) - Mr. Taylor, Defense Attorney
- The Bugle Sounds (1942) - Veterinarian (uncredited)
- North to the Klondike (1942) - Tom Allen
- Mr. and Mrs. North (1942) - Policeman (uncredited)
- The Fleet's In (1942) - Lt. Commander (uncredited)
- The Power of God (1942) - Edward Hale
- Valley of the Sun (1942) - Major at Court Martial (uncredited)
- Reap the Wild Wind (1942) - Turnkey (uncredited)
- Canal Zone (1942) - Cmdr. Merrill
- To the Shores of Tripoli (1942) - Doctor (uncredited)
- Mississippi Gambler (1942) - Colonel (uncredited)
- My Gal Sal (1942) - Mr. Dreiser
- Ten Gentlemen from West Point (1942) - Capt. Sloane
- The Postman Didn't Ring (1942) - Postal Insp. Brennan
- The Major and the Minor (1942) - Conductor #1 (uncredited)
- The Navy Comes Through (1942) - Judge Advocate (uncredited)
- Flight for Freedom (1943) - Prosperous Gent (uncredited)
- Crash Dive (1943) - Shipwrecked Captain (uncredited)
- Daredevils of the West (1943, Serial) - Col. Andrews [Ch. 1, 12]
- The Ox-Bow Incident (1943) - Bartlett (uncredited)
- Bombardier (1943) - Congressman (uncredited)
- It's a Great Life (1943) - Attorney Schuster #2 (uncredited)
- Dixie (1943) - Mr. Masters (uncredited)
- The Adventures of a Rookie (1943) - Gen. Ames (uncredited)
- Riding High (1943) - Reynolds (uncredited)
- Canyon City (1943) - Johnson - Water Co. President
- In Old Oklahoma (1943) - Mason - Indian Agent (uncredited)
- True to Life (1943) - Frank, Bakery Foreman (uncredited)
- It Happened Tomorrow (1944) - Policeman (uncredited)
- Rosie the Riveter (1944) - General (uncredited)
- Follow the Boys (1944) - Australian Officer (uncredited)
- The Hitler Gang (1944) - Otto Meissner (uncredited)
- Tucson Raiders (1944) - Governor York
- Man from Frisco (1944) - Chief Campbell
- Sensations of 1945 (1944) - Mr. Collins (uncredited)
- Wing and a Prayer (1944) - Marine General (uncredited)
- Atlantic City (1944) - Rogers
- Vigilantes of Dodge City (1944) - General Wingate (uncredited)
- The Princess and the Pirate (1944) - Captain 'Mary Ann'
- Faces in the Fog (1944) - Iverson, Juror (uncredited)
- Music for Millions (1944) - Doctor in Hospital (uncredited)
- Practically Yours (1944) - Shipyard Official (uncredited)
- Lake Placid Serenade (1944) - Executive (uncredited)
- Keep Your Powder Dry (1945) - Colonel Greeting Cadets (uncredited)
- Between Two Women (1945) - Slipper Room Patron (uncredited)
- Trail to Vengeance (1945) - Sheriff Morgan
- Code of the Lawless (1945) - Chadwick Hilton Sr.
- The Daltons Ride Again (1945) - Tex Walters (uncredited)
- Road to Utopia (1945) - Joe - Official at Ship (uncredited)
- Adventure (1945) - Bit Part (uncredited)
- God's Country (1946) - Howard King
- The Hoodlum Saint (1946) - Chronicle Publisher (uncredited)
- The Virginian (1946) - Rancher (uncredited)
- Bad Bascomb (1946) - Col. Cartright (uncredited)
- Smoky (1946) - Fred Kramer - Rancher (uncredited)
- Mr. Ace (1946) - Tomahawk Club Boss (uncredited)
- Two Years Before the Mast (1946) - Policeman (uncredited)
- Wake Up and Dream (1946) - Conductor (uncredited)
- Till the Clouds Roll By (1946) - Doctor (uncredited)
- San Quentin (1946) - Head Guard (uncredited)
- It's a Wonderful Life (1946) - Mr. Welch (uncredited)
- California (1947) - Willoughby (uncredited)
- Scared to Death (1947) - Pathologist
- Easy Come, Easy Go (1947) - Detective (uncredited)
- Trail Street (1947) - Ferguson (uncredited)
- The Michigan Kid (1947) - Sheriff of Rawhide
- The Sea of Grass (1947) - Bill the Sheriff (uncredited)
- Millie's Daughter (1947) - Detective (uncredited)
- King of the Wild Horses (1947) - Sheriff Jason Ballau (uncredited)
- High Barbaree (1947) - Farmer (uncredited)
- Blaze of Noon (1947) - Bartender (uncredited)
- Framed (1947) - Detective (uncredited)
- Robin Hood of Texas (1947) - Mr. Hamby - Saddle Shop Owner
- Killer Dill (1947) - Mr. Jones - Underwear Customer (uncredited)
- Desire Me (1947) - Emile (fishing boat captain) (uncredited)
- The Fabulous Texan (1947) - Vigilante Leader (uncredited)
- Road to Rio (1947) - Capt. Harmon
- Perilous Waters (1948) - Capt. Porter
- Panhandle (1948) - Tyler
- The Man from Texas (1948) - Sheriff (uncredited)
- I Remember Mama (1948) - Minister (uncredited)
- Docks of New Orleans (1948) - Theodore Von Scherbe
- Mr. Blandings Builds His Dream House (1948) - Mr. Murphy (uncredited)
- State of the Union (1948) - Senator (uncredited)
- The Dead Don't Dream (1948) - Jesse Williams
- Best Man Wins (1948) - Sheriff Dingle
- The Fuller Brush Man (1948) - Det. Ferguson (uncredited)
- Sinister Journey (1948) - Tom Smith
- Jinx Money (1948) - Mr. Morgan, Bank President (uncredited)
- Northwest Stampede (1948) - Bowles
- A Southern Yankee (1948) - Secret Service Agent (uncredited)
- The Man from Colorado (1948) - Roger MacDonald (uncredited)
- The Return of Wildfire (1948) - Pop Marlowe
- Adventures of Frank and Jesse James (1948, Serial) - Jim Powell [Ch.1]
- My Dear Secretary (1948) - Mr. McNally - Publisher (uncredited)
- Leather Gloves (1948) - Mr. Hubbard
- The Valiant Hombre (1948) - Sheriff George Dodge
- The Paleface (1948) - Commissioner Emerson
- Last of the Wild Horses (1948) - Rancher Pete Ferguson
- Brothers in the Saddle (1949) - Sheriff Oakley
- The Last Bandit (1949) - Jeff Baldwin
- Blondie's Big Deal (1949) - Mr. Forsythe
- Fighting Fools (1949) - Boxing Commissioner
- Roughshod (1949) - Sam Ellis (uncredited)
- The Doolins of Oklahoma (1949) - Coffeyville Sheriff (uncredited)
- Look for the Silver Lining (1949) - Producer (uncredited)
- Trail of the Yukon (1949) - Rogers
- Brimstone (1949) - Edward Winslow
- Tough Assignment (1949) - Chief Investigator Patterson
- Samson and Delilah (1949) - (uncredited)
- The Traveling Saleswoman (1950) - Dr. Stephen Monroe (uncredited)
- The Nevadan (1950) - Deputy Morgan (uncredited)
- Blonde Dynamite (1950) - Mr. Jennings, Bank President
- West of Wyoming (1950) - Simon Miller
- Mule Train (1950) - Chalmers (uncredited)
- Tyrant of the Sea (1950) - Officer (uncredited)
- The Arizona Cowboy (1950) - Jim Davenport
- Cargo to Capetown (1950) - Capt. Richards (uncredited)
- Riding High (1950) - Veterinarian (uncredited)
- Outcasts of Black Mesa (1950) - Sheriff Grasset
- Rock Island Trail (1950) - Businessman (uncredited)
- Salt Lake Raiders (1950) - Chief Marshal
- Colt .45 (1950) - Sheriff (uncredited)
- Trigger, Jr. (1950) - Rancher Wilkins
- Where Danger Lives (1950) - Dr. Matthews (uncredited)
- Streets of Ghost Town (1950) - Dusty Creek Sheriff
- Across the Badlands (1950) - Sheriff Crocker
- Two Flags West (1950) - Col. Hoffman (uncredited)
- Copper Canyon (1950) - Joe the Bartender (uncredited)
- Under Mexicali Stars (1950) - Race Announcer
- Short Grass (1950) - Pete Lynch
- Stage to Tucson (1950) - El Paso Sheriff Winters (uncredited)
- Al Jennings of Oklahoma (1951) - Marshal Ken Slattery
- Vengeance Valley (1951) - Mead Calhoun
- The Lemon Drop Kid (1951) - Judge Wilkinson (uncredited)
- Saddle Legion (1951) - Chief John Layton
- The Texas Rangers (1951) - Marshal Gorey (uncredited)
- Silver Canyon (1951) - Major Weatherly (uncredited)
- Hot Lead (1951) - Warden Lewis (uncredited)
- Utah Wagon Train (1951) - Sheriff
- Superman and the Mole Men (1951) - The Sheriff
- The Greatest Show on Earth (1952) - Spectator (uncredited)
- Lone Star (1952) - Mr. Thompson (uncredited)
- Waco (1952) - Judge
- Man from the Black Hills (1952) - Pop Fallon
- Talk About a Stranger (1952) - Mr. Wetzell, Orange Grower (uncredited)
- Kansas Territory (1952) - Governor
- And Now Tomorrow (1952)
- Carson City (1952) - Mine Owner on Train (uncredited)
- Thundering Caravans (1952) - Henry Scott
- Woman of the North Country (1952) - Captain (uncredited)
- Fargo (1952) - Judge Bruce
- Montana Belle (1952) - Marshal Combs
- Ride the Man Down (1952) - Phil Evarts (uncredited)
- The Bad and the Beautiful (1952) - Sheriff (uncredited)
- Powder River (1953) - Townsman (uncredited)
- The Adventures of Superman (1953) - Mr Garvin
- Canadian Mounties vs. Atomic Invaders (1953, Serial) - Anderson [Chs.1-5]
- Ride, Vaquero! (1953) - Gen. Sheridan (uncredited)
- Dangerous Crossing (1953) - Ship's Pilot (uncredited)
- El Paso Stampede (1953) - Marshal Zeke Banning
- The Great Adventures of Captain Kidd (1953, Serial) - Trapper (uncredited)
- Appointment in Honduras (1953) - Capt. McTaggart
- Those Redheads from Seattle (1953) - Sheriff (uncredited)
- All the Brothers Were Valiant (1953) - Matthew Shore's Father (uncredited)
- Southwest Passage (1954) - Constable Bartlett (uncredited)
- Dawn at Socorro (1954) - Old Man Ferris
- The Steel Cage (1954) - Roy, Head Guard (segment "The Hostages")
- Treasure of Ruby Hills (1955) - Marshal Garvey
- The Night Holds Terror (1955) - Mr. Courtier (uncredited)
- The Twinkle in God's Eye (1955) - Sheriff (uncredited)
- Star in the Dust (1956) - Ben Smith
- The Three Outlaws (1956) - Railroad President
- Frontier Gambler (1956) - Constable Philo Dewey
- Gun for a Coward (1957) - Old Nester (uncredited)
- Untamed Youth (1957) - Farmer Collingwood (uncredited)
- Cole Younger, Gunfighter (1958) - The Judge (uncredited)
- Cry Terror! (1958) - Older Executive (uncredited) (final film)
