= Pat Flaherty (actor) =

American actor (1897–1970)

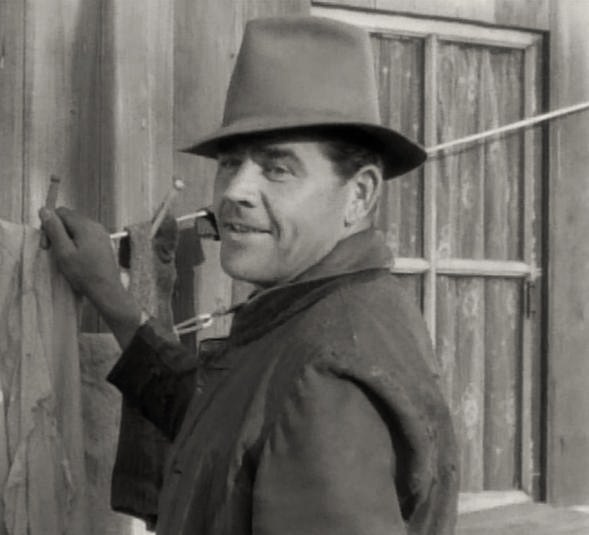
- Pat Flaherty in My Man Godfrey (1936)
- Born: Edmund Joseph Flaherty; March 8, 1897; Washington, D.C., U.S.
- Died: December 2, 1970 (aged 73); New York City, U.S.
- Years active: 1930s–1950s
- Spouse(s): Dorothy Fiske (m. 191?; ? 192?) Dorothea Xaviera Fugazy (m. 1929)
- Children: 3

Edmund Joseph Flaherty (March 8, 1897 – December 2, 1970) was an American film actor who appeared in about 200 films.

== Biography ==
=== Early life ===
Flaherty was born Edmund Joseph Flaherty in Washington, D.C.; the son of Mary Rose Ella (née Wilson) and Michael Joseph Flaherty. He was the older brother of writer Vincent X. Flaherty. Flaherty had Irish ancestry. Pat attended Eastern High School, and Dean College in Franklin, Massachusetts. After playing baseball, he attended Princeton University and graduated on January 26, 1918. Flaherty served in the U.S. Army during the Pancho Villa Expedition and then as an U.S. Army Air Service pilot in World War I.

=== Early athletic career ===
Flaherty was a popular Washington, D.C., athlete and coach, who went on to become a professional baseball and football player and was in the bullpen for John McGraw's New York Giants during the 1921 World Series, and punted for George Halas' Chicago Bears. After his professional athletic career ended, he went into the music publishing business with the legendary DeSylva, Brown and Henderson during the time of Mayor Jimmy Walker in New York.

=== Acting career ===
Flaherty relocated to Hollywood to take a position as a producer at 20th Century Fox for the owner Joseph P. Kennedy when the Great Depression began. Subsequently, he found work as an actor and technical advisor in over 200 motion pictures. Flaherty can be seen in roles both large and small in films such as Death on the Diamond (1934), Mutiny on the Bounty (1935), Sergeant York (1941), Yankee Doodle Dandy (1942), The Pride of the Yankees (1942), It Happened in Flatbush (1942), and a bit appearance as a bewildered Marine in Stage Door Canteen.

In 1943, he was commissioned in the U.S. Marine Corps as a captain. He returned to the Corps for the Korean War and finished his service as a major.

He resumed his acting career after the war with The Stratton Story (1949, as the Western All-Stars coach), The Jackie Robinson Story (1950) and The Winning Team (1952, as legendary umpire Bill Klem). He was given the task of making William Bendix look, move and act like Babe Ruth in The Babe Ruth Story, and Gary Cooper to pitch, look, move and act like Lou Gehrig in Pride of the Yankees. Outside the realm of baseball, Flaherty was usually cast in blunt, muscle-bound roles, notably Fredric March's taciturn male nurse "Cuddles" in A Star is Born (1937). One of Flaherty's most unusual roles was in Wheeler & Woolsey's Off Again, On Again (1937), in which his character finds his wife (played by actress Patricia Wilder) in a compromising position with Bert Wheeler; he does not pummel the hapless Wheeler as expected, but instead meekly apologizes for his wife's flirtatiousness.

=== Personal life ===
Flaherty was married twice. His first wife was Dorothy Fiske. The couple had one child, Edmund Flaherty, Jr. who was born in 1919 and died in 1995, by which time his name had been changed to Edmund Graham. On January 19, 1929, Flaherty married Dorothea Xaviera Fugazy, daughter of boxing promoter Jack Fugazy aka Humbert Fugazy. They had two children, Patrick Joseph Flaherty and Frances X. Flaherty Knox.

Flaherty died on December 4, 1970, in New York City of a heart attack. He was interred at Long Island National Cemetery on December 7.

== Filmography ==
Year	Film	Role	Director	Notes
1934	Come On, Marines!	Peewee	Henry Hathaway	
1934	She Made Her Bed	State Policeman	Ralph Murphy	uncredited
1934	Twentieth Century	Flannigan	Howard Hawks	uncredited
1934	The Thin Man	Fighter at Party	W. S. Van Dyke	uncredited
1934	The Girl from Missouri	Jerry – Photo	Jack Conway	uncredited
1934	Million Dollar Ransom	Friend in Nightclub	Murray Roth	uncredited
1934	Have a Heart	Silver Dollar Steve, the Thief	David Butler	uncredited
1934	Death on the Diamond	Pat – Cardinal Coach	Edward Sedgwick	uncredited
1934	Cheating Cheaters	Gym Instructor	Richard Thorpe	uncredited
1934	365 Nights in Hollywood	Dancing Boy	George Marshall	uncredited
1934	Bright Eyes	Aviator in Raincoat	David Butler	uncredited
1934	Forsaking All Others	Turkish Bath Attendant	W.S. Van Dyke	uncredited
1934	The Mighty Barnum	Mike	Walter Lang	uncredited
1935	Mystery Woman	Policeman	Eugene Forde	uncredited
1935	Under Pressure	Announcer of Winning Team	Raoul Walsh	uncredited
1935	Shadow of Doubt	Peters – Taxi Driver	George B. Seitz	uncredited
1935	After Office Hours	Police Guard at Gate	Robert Z. Leonard	uncredited
1935	Naughty Marietta	Minor Role		uncredited
1935	Times Square Lady	Buck Pierson – Hockey Player	George B. Seitz	uncredited
1935	The Casino Murder Case	Watchman	Edwin L. Marin	uncredited
1935	It Happened in New York	Reporter	Alan Crosland	uncredited
1935	Eight Bells	Mike		uncredited
1935	G Men	Cop with Farrell	William Keighley	uncredited
1935	Air Hawks	Frank Dunlap – Pilot	Albert Rogell	uncredited
1935	Call of the Wild	Dandy on Street	William A. Wellman	uncredited
1935	China Seas	Second Officer Kingston	Tay Garnett	uncredited
1935	Mutiny on the Bounty	Churchill	Frank Lloyd	
1935	Whipsaw	Detective at Dock	Sam Wood	uncredited
1936	Modern Times	Jail Guard	Charlie Chaplin	uncredited
1936	Love Before Breakfast	Bouncer	Walter Lang	uncredited
1936	Sons o' Guns	Apache Dancer	Lloyd Bacon	uncredited
1936	Trouble for Two	Ship's Officer	J. Walter Ruben	uncredited
1936	Counterfeit	Carter		uncredited
1936	Hearts in Bondage	Bucko's Friend	Lew Ayres	uncredited
1936	Straight from the Shoulder	Policeman	Stuart Heisler	uncredited
1936	My Man Godfrey	Mike Flaherty	Gregory La Cava	
1936	The Luckiest Girl in the World	Finnigan	Edward Buzzell	
1936	End of the Trail	Rough Rider	Erle C. Kenton	uncredited
1936	The Magnificent Brute	John	John G. Blystone	uncredited
1936	Pigskin Parade	Referee	David Butler	uncredited
1936	Flying Hostess	2nd Detective	Murray Roth	
1937	Woman-Wise	Duke Fuller	Allan Dwan	
1937	A Star Is Born	Cuddles	William A. Wellman	uncredited
1937	San Quentin	Cop Clearing May	Lloyd Bacon	uncredited
1937	Parnell	Parliament Member Parnell Socks	John M. Stahl	uncredited
1937	A Day at the Races	Detective with Sheriff	Sam Wood	uncredited
1937	On Again-Off Again	Mr. Green	Edward Cline	
1937	She Asked for It	Inspector Bacon	Erle C. Kenton	uncredited
1937	Stand-In	Nightclub Bouncer	Tay Garnett; Charles Kerr (assistant)	uncredited
1937	A Girl with Ideas	Motorcycle Cop	S. Sylvan Simon	uncredited
1937	That Navy Spirit	Coach Hanley	Kurt Neumann	
1937	Fight for Your Lady	Mr. Russell	Benjamin Stoloff	uncredited
1937	Navy Blue and Gold	Coach of Southern Institute	Sam Wood	
1937	Submarine D-1	Louie – Disagreeable Bluejacket at Panama	Lloyd Bacon	uncredited
1937	Telephone Operator	Tom Sommers	Scott Pembroke	
1937	She Loved a Fireman	Duggan	John Farrow	
1937	She's Got Everything	Van Driver	Joseph Santley	uncredited
1937	The Bad Man of Brimstone	Federal Marshal	J. Walter Ruben	uncredited
1938	Hollywood Stadium Mystery	Ace Cummings	David Howard	
1938	Merrily We Live	Pat – Police Officer	Norman Z. McLeod	uncredited
1938	Joy of Living	Autograph Hound Punched by Dan	Tay Garnett	uncredited
1938	The Main Event	Moran	Danny Dare	
1938	You Can't Take It with You	Police Guard at Courtroom Entrance	Frank Capra	uncredited
1938	Always in Trouble	Gideon Stubbs	Joseph Santley	
1938	Secrets of a Nurse	Dick Churchill, Burkes' Crooked Handler	Arthur Lubin	uncredited
1938	Newsboys' Home	Mulvaney	Harold Young	uncredited
1938	There's That Woman Again	Husky Gent	Alexander Hall	uncredited
1939	Convict's Code	Sniffy Johnson	Lambert Hillyer	
1939	Off the Record	Bartender	James Flood	uncredited
1939	Dodge City	Cowhand	Michael Curtiz	uncredited
1939	Code of the Streets	Visiting Guest	Harold Young	
1939	Boys' Reformatory	Mr. Barnes	Howard Bretherton	
1939	Only Angels Have Wings	Mike	Howard Hawks	
1939	Tell No Tales	Printer	Leslie Fenton	uncredited
1939	Torchy Blane... Playing with Dynamite	The Crusher's Handler	Noel M. Smith	
1939	Sabotage	Minor Role	Harold Young	uncredited
1939	The Housekeeper's Daughter	Detective	Hal Roach	uncredited
1939	Legion of Lost Flyers	Sam Bradford	Christy Cabanne	
1939	Kid Nightingale	Soxey – Tavern Owner	George Amy	uncredited
1939	Man from Montreal	Tom	Christy Cabanne	uncredited
1939	Miracle on Main Street	Detective		
1939	The Big Guy	Policeman	Arthur Lubin	uncredited
1939	Invisible Stripes	Worker	Lloyd Bacon	uncredited
1940	His Girl Friday	Frank – Policeman	Howard Hawks	uncredited
1940	The Grapes of Wrath	Deputy	John Ford	uncredited
1940	Castle on the Hudson	Stretcher Attendant	Anatole Litvak	uncredited
1940	Midnight Limited	Train Conductor		
1940	My Son, My Son!	Joe Baxter	Charles Vidor	
1940	And One Was Beautiful	Visitor's Room Guard	Robert B. Sinclair	uncredited
1940	Sailor's Lady	Chief Petty Officer	Allan Dwan	uncredited
1940	Black Diamonds	Johnson	Christy Cabanne	
1940	They Drive by Night	Driver in Cafe	Raoul Walsh	uncredited
1940	Boom Town	Man at Dice Table	Jack Conway	uncredited
1940	City for Conquest	Dance Floor Guard	Anatole Litvak; Jean Negulesco (uncredited)	uncredited
1940	Knute Rockne All American	Worker	Lloyd Bacon; William K. Howard (uncredited)	scenes deleted
1940	The Great Dictator	Friendly Storm Trooper	Charlie Chaplin	uncredited
1940	Sandy Gets Her Man	Policeman		uncredited
1940	Flight Command	2nd Duty Officer	Frank Borzage	
1940	Kitty Foyle	Police Sergeant	Sam Wood	uncredited
1941	The Strawberry Blonde	Mat Hughes – Policeman	Raoul Walsh	uncredited
1941	Murder Among Friends	Cop	Ray McCarey	uncredited
1941	Meet John Doe	Mike	Frank Capra	uncredited
1941	Dead Men Tell	Policeman with Checklist	Harry Lachman	uncredited
1941	The Devil and Miss Jones	Mark – Policeman with Pickpocket	Sam Wood	uncredited
1941	Affectionately Yours	Harmon	Lloyd Bacon	
1941	Sergeant York	Sergeant Harry Parsons	Howard Hawks	
1941	Highway West	Eddie – Motorcycle Cop	William C. McGann	
1941	We Go Fast	Police Sergeant	William C. McGann	uncredited
1941	Unexpected Uncle	Mounted Policeman	Peter Godfrey	uncredited
1941	Rise and Shine	Pat – Assistant Coach	Allan Dwan	uncredited
1941	Ball of Fire	Deputy	Howard Hawks	uncredited
1942	Fly-by-Night	Taxi Driver at Station	Robert Siodmak	uncredited
1942	Pardon My Stripes	Coach	John H. Auer	uncredited
1942	Captains of the Clouds	Drill Sergeant	Michael Curtiz	uncredited
1942	Who Is Hope Schuyler?	Nash		
1942	Saboteur	George – Elevator Operator	Alfred Hitchcock	uncredited
1942	Private Buckaroo	Drill Sergeant	Edward F. Cline	uncredited
1942	My Favorite Spy	Last Recruit Smelling Gas	Tay Garnett; James Anderson (assistant)	uncredited
1942	It Happened in Flatbush	Pat O'Hara – Pitcher	Ray McCarey	
1942	Yankee Doodle Dandy	Sgt. Lewis – White House Guard	Michael Curtiz	uncredited
1942	Juke Girl	Mike, Timmony Driver	Curtis Bernhardt	uncredited
1942	The Pride of the Yankees	Yankee Ballplayer	Sam Wood	uncredited
1942	Just Off Broadway	Detective	Herbert I. Leeds	uncredited
1942	Gentleman Jim	Harry Corbett	Raoul Walsh	uncredited
1942	Two Mugs from Brooklyn	Pat, gym attendant	Kurt Neumann	
1943	Hit the Ice	Police Lieutenant	Charles Lamont	uncredited
1943	Two Tickets to London	Mulvaney	Edwin L. Marin	uncredited
1943	Stage Door Canteen	Dubious Army Sergeant	Frank Borzage	uncredited
1943	Good Luck, Mr. Yates	Sergeant Moore		uncredited
1943	Adventures of the Flying Cadets	Tanner [Chs. 2–4]	Ray Taylor	
1946	The Madonna's Secret	Policeman	Wilhelm Thiele	uncredited
1946	Her Kind of Man	Detective	Frederick De Cordova	uncredited
1946	Joe Palooka, Champ	Patrick Burke, Referee	Reginald LeBorg	uncredited
1946	Dangerous Business	Plainclothesman	D. Ross Lederman	uncredited
1946	Rendezvous with Annie	MP	Allan Dwan	uncredited
1946	It Shouldn't Happen to a Dog	Policeman	Herbert I. Leeds	uncredited
1946	The Last Crooked Mile	Motorcycle Officer	Philip Ford	uncredited
1946	G.I. War Brides	Lt. Cardigan	George Blair	uncredited
1946	Step by Step	Motorcycle Cop #1	Phil Rosen	uncredited
1946	Home Sweet Homicide	Policeman Murphy	Lloyd Bacon	uncredited
1946	Decoy	Policeman	Jack Bernhard	uncredited
1946	Shadowed	Cop at Golf Course	John Sturges	uncredited
1946	Nocturne	Flanagan – Cop with Susan	Edwin L. Marin	uncredited
1946	The Best Years of Our Lives	Salvage Foreman	William Wyler	uncredited
1947	Angel and the Badman	Baker Brother	James Edward Grant	uncredited
1947	The Red House	Motorcycle Cop	Delmer Daves	uncredited
1947	New Orleans	Moving Man	Arthur Lubin	uncredited
1947	The Long Night	Police Sergeant	Anatole Litvak	uncredited
1947	Something in the Wind	Cop at Desk	Irving Pichel	uncredited
1947	The Bachelor and the Bobby-Soxer	Sunset High Coach	Irving Reis	uncredited
1947	The Fabulous Texan	Springern	Edward Ludwig	uncredited
1947	Where There's Life	Joe O'Brien	Sidney Lanfield	uncredited
1948	The Treasure of the Sierra Madre	Customer in Bar Who Warns Curtin and Dobbs about Pat McCormick	John Huston	uncredited
1948	All My Sons	Bartender	Irving Reis	uncredited
1948	April Showers	Mike	James V. Kern	uncredited
1948	The Noose Hangs High	Tough Driver	Charles Barton	uncredited
1948	The Cobra Strikes	Atlas Kilroy	Charles Reisner	
1948	Silver River	Foreman	Raoul Walsh	uncredited
1948	Give My Regards to Broadway	Wallace	Lloyd Bacon	uncredited
1948	Key Largo	The Traveler	John Huston	uncredited
1948	The Babe Ruth Story	Bill Carrigan, Red Sox Manager	Roy Del Ruth	
1948	Night Has a Thousand Eyes	Policeman	John Farrow	uncredited
1949	Take Me Out to the Ball Game	World Series Umpire	Busby Berkeley	uncredited
1949	The Stratton Story	Western Manager	Sam Wood	uncredited
1949	One Last Fling	Taxicab Driver	Peter Godfrey	uncredited
1949	It's a Great Feeling	Charlie, Studio Gate Guard	David Butler	uncredited
1949	Roseanna McCoy	Joe McCoy	Irving Reis; Nicholas Ray (uncredited)	uncredited
1949	Tell It to the Judge	Policeman in Gambling House Raid	Norman Foster	uncredited
1950	Blondie's Hero	Recruiting Sergeant	Edward Bernds	uncredited
1950	The Good Humor Man	Officer Rhodes	Lloyd Bacon	
1950	The Daughter of Rosie O'Grady	Ed Powers – Bartender	David Butler	uncredited
1950	Kill the Umpire	George Welch – American League Scout	Lloyd Bacon	uncredited
1950	The Jackie Robinson Story	Karpen	Alfred E. Green	
1950	The Asphalt Jungle	Policeman	John Huston	uncredited
1950	Bright Leaf	Farmer	Michael Curtiz	uncredited
1950	Three Little Words	Coach	Richard Thorpe	uncredited
1950	David Harding, Counterspy	C.P.O.		uncredited
1950	The Petty Girl	Policeman #2	Henry Levin	uncredited
1950	Tea for Two	Terry Clancy – Motorcycle Cop	David Butler	uncredited
1950	Harvey	Policeman	Henry Koster	uncredited
1951	Storm Warning	Walker	Stuart Heisler	uncredited
1951	The Lemon Drop Kid	Police Captain Swain	Sidney Lanfield; Frank Tashlin (uncredited)	uncredited
1951	Angels in the Outfield	Boston Braves Manager	Clarence Brown	uncredited
1951	Detective Story	Desk Sergeant	William Wyler	uncredited
1951	The Racket	Policeman, Car 43	Mel Ferrer	uncredited
1952	Meet Danny Wilson	'Mother' Murphy	Joseph Pevney	uncredited
1952	Hoodlum Empire	Mikkelson	Joseph Kane	
1952	The Pride of St. Louis	Umpire	Harmon Jones	uncredited
1952	Pat and Mike	Golf Course Commentator	George Cukor	uncredited
1952	The Winning Team	Bill Klem – Umpire	Lewis Seiler	uncredited
1952	Ride the Man Down	Pat – Bartender	Joseph Kane	uncredited
1952	Million Dollar Mermaid	Policeman at Montauk Point	Mervyn LeRoy	uncredited
1952	Blackbeard the Pirate	Job Maggot	Raoul Walsh	
1952	Off Limits	Military Policeman	George Marshall	uncredited
1953	Latin Lovers	Jim Webson – Polo Player	Mervyn LeRoy	uncredited
1954	The Bowery Boys Meet the Monsters	O'Meara	Edward Bernds	uncredited
1954	Jungle Gents	Police Officer Flaherty	Edward Bernds	Uncredited
1954	Athena	Contest Judge	Richard Thorpe	Uncredited
1955	The Road to Denver	Green	Joseph Kane	Uncredited
1955	The Desperate Hours	Dutch	William Wyler	Uncredited
