= Grace Neville =

Grace Neville may refer to:

- Grace Neville (screenwriter)
- Grace Neville (footballer)
