= Dangerous Intrigue =

1936 film by David Selman

- Directed by: David Selman
- Written by: Harold Shumate; Grace Neville
- Produced by: Harry L. Decker; Robert North
- Starring: Ralph Bellamy; Gloria Shea; Joan Perry
- Cinematography: George Meehan
- Edited by: Al Clark
- Production company: Columbia Pictures
- Distributed by: Columbia Pictures
- Release date: January 4, 1936
- Running time: 59 minutes
- Country: United States
- Language: English

Dangerous Intrigue is a 1936 American drama film directed by David Selman and starring Ralph Bellamy, Gloria Shea and Joan Perry.

== Main cast ==
- Ralph Bellamy as Tony Halliday
- Gloria Shea as Gerta Kosovic
- Joan Perry as Carol Andrews
- Fred Kohler as Brant
- Frederick Vogeding as Joe Kosovec
- Edward LeSaint as Dr. Miller
- Georgie Billings as Danny Brant
- Boyd Irwin as Dr. Wagner
- Gene Morgan as Taxi Driver
- Stanley Andrews as Mr. Mitchell

== Critical reception ==
Variety described the plot as "rather creaky …. that of the failure who wanders to new surroundings and makes good" but acknowledged that the film benefited from "some capable direction and acting." Ralph Bellamy deserved "most laurels for his believable portrayal …. though the villainous Fred Kohler runs him a close race."

The Film Daily described Dangerous Intrigue as "a sympathy-evoking drama, suitable for the pop stands or for bills aimed at family audiences."

== Bibliography ==
- James Monaco. The Encyclopedia of Film. Perigee Books, 1991.
