= Douglass Dumbrille =

Canadian-American actor (1889–1974)

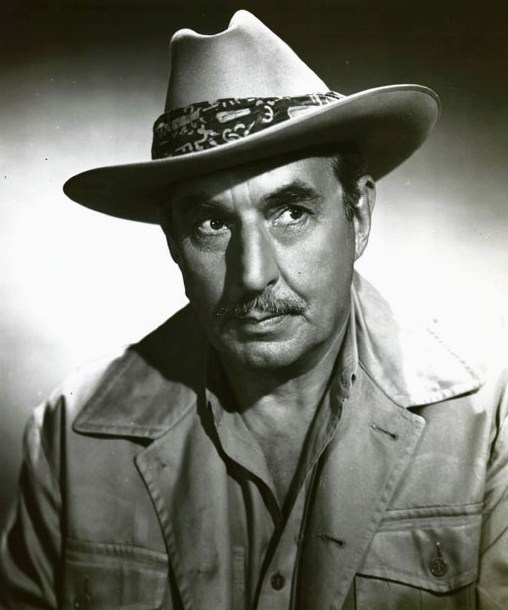
- Dumbrille in Blonde Savage (1947)
- Born: Douglass Rupert Dumbrille; October 13, 1889; Hamilton, Ontario, Canada
- Died: April 2, 1974 (aged 84); Woodland Hills, California, U.S.
- Occupation: Actor
- Years active: 1924–64
- Spouses: Jessie Lawson (m. 1910; died 1957) Patricia Mowbray (m. 1960)
- Children: 2

Douglass Rupert Dumbrille (October 13, 1889 – April 2, 1974) was a Canadian character actor who appeared regularly in films during the Golden age of Hollywood.

== Life and career ==
Douglass Dumbrille (/ˈdʌmbrɪl/ DUM-bril) was born in Hamilton, Ontario. As a young man, he was employed as a bank clerk in Hamilton while pursuing an interest in acting. He eventually left banking for the theatre, finding work with a stock company that led him to Chicago, Illinois, and another that toured the United States.

In 1913, the East Coast film industry was flourishing and that year he appeared in the film What Eighty Million Women Want, but it would be another 11 years before he appeared on screen again. In 1924, he made his Broadway debut and worked off and on in the theatre for several years while supplementing his income by selling such products as car accessories, tea, insurance, real estate, and books.

During the Great Depression, Dumbrille resumed his screen career in Hollywood, where he specialized in playing secondary character roles alongside the great stars of the day. His suave voice and debonair appearance frequently cast him as a slick politician, corrupt businessman, unscrupulous lawyer or crooked sheriff. He was highly regarded by the movie studios, and was sought out by Cecil B. DeMille, Frank Capra, Hal Roach and other prominent Hollywood filmmakers.

He played similar roles in Capra's film Broadway Bill (1934) (and the 1950 remake, Riding High), and DeMille's version of The Buccaneer (1938, and the 1958 remake). A friend of fellow Canadian-born director Allan Dwan, Dumbrille played Athos in Dwan's adaptation of The Three Musketeers (1939).

Dumbrille had roles in more than 200 motion pictures. He also played villainous roles in comedies, projecting a balance of menace and pomposity opposite the Marx Brothers, Abbott and Costello, and The Bowery Boys.

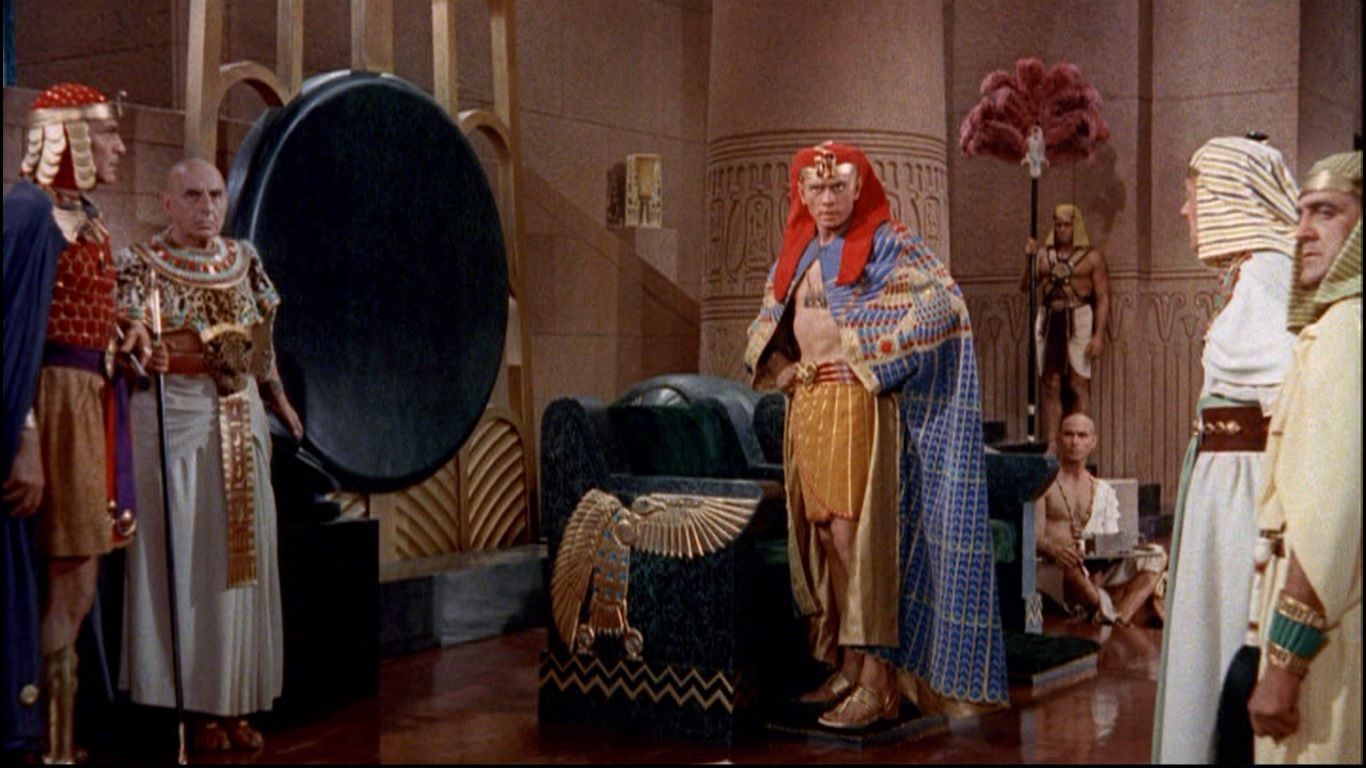
From left to right: Henry Wilcoxon, Dumbrille, Yul Brynner, and others in the trailer for The Ten Commandments (1956)

He portrayed the Egyptian priest and magician Jannes in DeMille's final film, The Ten Commandments (1956).

With the advent of television, Dumbrille made numerous appearances in the 1950s and 1960s. He played a flustered tycoon driven to distraction by Gracie Allen on the Burns and Allen episode "Company for Christmas" (1955). He was cast in six episodes of the religion anthology series, Crossroads. He portrayed Senator Bates in "Thanksgiving Prayer" (1956) with Ron Hagerthy of Sky King. Dumbrille then portrayed Mr. Willoughby in "Big Sombrero" (1957). He guest-starred in the 1957 episode "The Fighter" of the CBS situation comedy Mr. Adams and Eve. In 1958, he was cast as Mayor John Geary in three episodes of the NBC western series, The Californians. He subsequently guest-starred in Frank Aletter's CBS sitcom, Bringing Up Buddy. He portrayed Mr. Osborne in six episodes of the 1963–1964 situation comedy The New Phil Silvers Show.

Dumbrille made two guest appearances as a judge on CBS's Perry Mason; in 1964 he played Judge Robert Adler in "The Case of the Latent Lover", and in 1965 he played an unnamed judge in "The Case of the Duplicate Case". In his final television role, he portrayed a doctor in episode 10 of Batman in February 1966.

== Personal life and death ==
Dumbrille's wife Jessie Lawson, mother of their son John and daughter Douglass (Dougie), died in 1957 after 47 years of marriage. In 1960, at the age of 70, Dumbrille married Patricia Mowbray, the 28-year-old daughter of his friend and fellow actor, Alan Mowbray. In response to criticism of the May–December marriage, Dumbrille rebuffed: "Age doesn’t mean a blasted thing. The important thing is whether two people can be happy together. Pat and I agreed that I had some years left and we could best share them together. We don’t give a continental damn what other people think."

Dumbrille died of a heart attack on April 2, 1974, at the Motion Picture Country Home and Hospital in Woodland Hills, California. He was interred at Valhalla Memorial Park in North Hollywood, California.

== Selected filmography ==
- What 80 Million Women Want (1913, silent film) as Minor Role
- The Declaration of Independence (1924, Short) as Thomas Paine
- His Woman (1931) as Alisandroe (uncredited)
- The Wiser Sex (1932) as Chauffeur - aka The Wop
- Blondie of the Follies (1932) as Murchenson
- That's My Boy (1932) as Coach 'Daisy' Adams
- The Pride of the Legion (1932) as McMahon
- I Am a Fugitive from a Chain Gang (1932) as District Attorney (uncredited)
- Laughter in Hell (1933) as Ed Perkins
- Hard to Handle (1933) as District Attorney (uncredited)
- Smoke Lightning (1933) as Sam Edson
- King of the Jungle (1933) as Ed Peters
- Rustlers' Roundup (1933) as Bill Brett
- The Working Man (1933) as Hammersmith - Lawyer (uncredited)
- Elmer, the Great (1933) as Stillman (uncredited)
- The Silk Express (1933) as Myton Associate (uncredited)
- Heroes for Sale (1933) as Jim - Chief Engineer (uncredited)
- The Man Who Dared (1933) as Judge Collier
- Baby Face (1933) as Brody
- Voltaire (1933) as Actor - Oriental King in Play (uncredited)
- The Big Brain (1933) as Dan Thomas
- I Loved a Woman (1933) as U.S. Attorney Brandt (uncredited)
- The Way to Love (1933) as Agent Chapusard
- Female (1933) as George Mumford
- The World Changes (1933) as Buffalo Bill Cody
- Lady Killer (1933) as Spade Maddock
- Convention City (1933)
- Massacre (1934) as Sen. Emory - Chairman (uncredited)
- Hi, Nellie! (1934) as Dawes
- Journal of a Crime (1934) as Germaine Cartier
- Harold Teen (1934) as H.H. Snatcher
- Fog Over Frisco (1934) as Mayard
- Operator 13 (1934) as Gen. Stuart
- Treasure Island (1934) as Israel Hands
- Hide-Out (1934) as DeSalle - Nightclub Owner
- Broadway Bill (1934) as Eddie Morgan
- The Secret Bride (1934) as Breeden
- The Lives of a Bengal Lancer (1935) as Mohammed Khan
- Naughty Marietta (1935) as Uncle
- Cardinal Richelieu (1935) as Count Baradas
- Air Hawks (1935) as Victor Arnold
- Unknown Woman (1935) as Phil Gardner
- Love Me Forever (1935) as Miller
- The Public Menace (1935) as Mario Tonelli
- Peter Ibbetson (1935) as Col. Forsythe
- Crime and Punishment (1935) as Grilov
- The Calling of Dan Matthews (1935) as Jeff Hardy
- The Lone Wolf Returns (1935) as Morphew
- You May Be Next (1936) as Beau Gardner
- The Music Goes 'Round (1936) as Bishop
- Mr. Deeds Goes to Town (1936) as John Cedar
- The Witness Chair (1936) as Stanley Whittaker
- The Princess Comes Across (1936) as Detective Lorel
- M'Liss (1936) as Lou Ellis
- End of the Trail (1936) as Bill Mason
- Counterfeit Lady (1936) as August Marino
- Woman in Distress (1937) as Jerome Culver
- A Day at the Races (1937) as J.D. Morgan
- The Emperor's Candlesticks (1937) as Mr. Korum - a Conspirator
- The Firefly (1937) as Marquis de Melito
- Ali Baba Goes to Town (1937) as Prince Musah
- The Buccaneer (1938) as Governor William C.C. Claiborne
- Stolen Heaven (1938) as Klingman
- Fast Company (1938) as Arnold Stamper
- The Mysterious Rider (1938) as Pecos Bill - aka Ben Wade
- Crime Takes a Holiday (1938) as J.J. Grant
- Storm Over Bengal (1938) as Ramin Khan
- Sharpshooters (1938) as Count Maxim
- Kentucky (1938) as John Dillon - 1861
- The Three Musketeers (1939) as Athos
- Mr. Moto in Danger Island (1939) as La Costa
- Tell No Tales (1939) as Matt Cooper
- Captain Fury (1939) as Preston
- Charlie Chan at Treasure Island (1939) as Thomas Gregory
- Thunder Afloat (1939) as District Commander
- Rovin' Tumbleweeds (1939) as Stephen Holloway
- Charlie Chan in City in Darkness (1939) as Petroff
- Slightly Honorable (1939) as George Taylor
- Virginia City (1940) as Major Drewery
- South of Pago Pago (1940) as Williams
- Michael Shayne, Private Detective (1940) as Gordon
- Murder Among Friends (1941) as Carter Stevenson
- The Round Up (1941) as Capt. Bob Lane
- Road to Zanzibar (1941) as Slave Trader
- Washington Melodrama (1941) as Donnelly
- The Big Store (1941) as Mr. Grover
- Ellery Queen and the Perfect Crime (1941) as John Matthews
- Castle in the Desert (1942) as Paul Manderley
- Ride 'Em Cowboy (1942) as Jake Rainwater
- A Gentleman After Dark (1942) as Enzo Calibra
- Ten Gentlemen from West Point (1942) as Gen. William Henry Harrison
- I Married an Angel (1942) as Baron Szigethy
- King of the Mounties (1942) as Harper
- Stand By for Action (1942) as Capt. Ludlow
- DuBarry Was a Lady (1943) as Willie / Duc de Rigor
- False Colors (1943) as Mark Foster
- Uncertain Glory (1944) as Police Commissioner LaFarge
- Lumberjack (1944) as Daniel J. Keefer
- Jungle Woman (1944) as District Attorney
- Forty Thieves (1944) as Tad Hammond
- Gypsy Wildcat (1944) as Baron Tovar
- Lost in a Harem (1944) as Nimativ
- Jungle Queen (1945) as Lang
- A Medal for Benny (1945) as General
- The Frozen Ghost (1945) as Inspector Brant
- Flame of the West (1945) as Marshal Tom Nightlander
- The Daltons Ride Again (1945) as Sheriff Hoskins
- Road to Utopia (1945) as Ace Larson
- Pardon My Past (1945) as Uncle Wills
- The Catman of Paris (1946) as Henry Borchard
- Night in Paradise (1946) as High Priest
- The Cat Creeps (1946) as Tom McGalvey
- Spook Busters (1946) as Dr. Coslow
- Under Nevada Skies (1946) as Courtney
- Monsieur Beaucaire (1946) as George Washington
- It's a Joke, Son! (1947) as Big Dan Healey
- Dishonored Lady (1947) as District Attorney O'Brien
- Dragnet (1947) as Frank Farrington
- Blonde Savage (1947) as Mark Harper
- Christmas Eve (1947) as Dr. Bunyan
- The Fabulous Texan (1947) as Luke Roland
- Beyond Our Own (1947) as E.W. Osborne
- Last of the Wild Horses (1948) as Charlie Cooper
- Dynamite (1949) as Hank Gibbons
- Riders of the Whistling Pines (1949) as Henry Mitchell
- The Lone Wolf and His Lady (1949) as John J. Murdock
- Addio Mimí! (1949) as Rouchard
- Alimony (1949) as Burton (Burt) Crail
- Joe Palooka in the Counterpunch (1949) as Capt. Lance
- Tell It to the Judge (1949) as George Ellerby
- Buccaneer's Girl (1950) as Capt. Martos
- Riding High (1950, remake of Broadway Bill) as Eddie Howard
- The Savage Horde (1950) as Col. Price
- Abbott and Costello in the Foreign Legion (1950) as Sheik Hamud El Khalid
- The Kangaroo Kid (1950) as Vincent Moller
- Rapture (1950) as W.C. Hutton
- A Millionaire for Christy (1951) as J.C. Thompson
- Scaramouche (1952) as Assembly President (uncredited)
- Son of Paleface (1952) as Sheriff McIntyre
- Apache War Smoke (1952) as Maj. Dekker
- Sky Full of Moon (1952) as Rodeo Official
- Julius Caesar (1953) as Lepidus
- Plunder of the Sun (1953) as Consul
- Captain John Smith and Pocahontas (1953) as Chief Powhatan
- World for Ransom (1954) as Insp. McCollum
- The Lawless Rider (1954) as Marshal Brady
- Jupiter's Darling (1955) as Scipio
- A Life at Stake (1954) as Gus Hillman
- Davy Crockett and the River Pirates (1956) as Saloon owner (uncredited) (archive footage)
- Shake, Rattle & Rock! (1956) as Eustace Fentwick III
- The Ten Commandments (1956) as Jannes
- The Go-Getter (1956) as Dr. Baker
- The Buccaneer (1958) as Collector of the Port
- High Time (1960) as Judge Carter (uncredited)
- Air Patrol (1962) as Millard Nolan
- Johnny Cool (1963) as Corrupt City Council Member
- What a Way to Go! (1964) as Minor Role (uncredited)
- Shock Treatment (1964) as Judge (uncredited)
