= Strange Alibi =

1941 film

- Theatrical release poster
- Directed by: D. Ross Lederman
- Written by: Kenneth Gamet; Leslie T. White; Fred Niblo Jr.
- Produced by: Bryan Foy
- Starring: Arthur Kennedy; Joan Perry; Jonathan Hale; John Ridgely; Florence Bates; Charles Trowbridge
- Cinematography: Allen G. Siegler
- Edited by: Frank Magee
- Music by: Howard Jackson; William Lava
- Production company: Warner Bros. Pictures
- Distributed by: Warner Bros. Pictures
- Release date: April 19, 1941
- Running time: 63 minutes
- Country: United States
- Language: English

Strange Alibi is a 1941 American film noir directed by D. Ross Lederman, written by Kenneth Gamet, Leslie T. White and Fred Niblo Jr., and starring Arthur Kennedy, Joan Perry, Jonathan Hale, John Ridgely, Florence Bates and Charles Trowbridge. It was released by Warner Bros. Pictures on April 19, 1941.

== Plot ==
After a witness is shot and a suspect hanged in a jail cell, Police Chief Sprague decides to send Sgt. Joe Geary undercover, looking for a mysterious crime-syndicate boss responsible for ordering these murders. A story is planted by the chief that Geary is being suspended from the force, in order to help him infiltrate the mob.

Geary discovers that a police captain is the criminal mastermind. Sprague is killed, though, and Geary framed when nobody believes his story about being undercover. While jailed, his fiancée Alice Devlin works to clear his name. Geary breaks out of jail and personally goes to the reform-minded governor to prove his innocence. Justice triumphs. Joe collapses onto a sofa and instantly falls asleep. Alice kneels beside him and gently kisses his forehead.

== Cast ==
- Arthur Kennedy as Sergeant Joe Geary
- Joan Perry as Alice Devlin
- Jonathan Hale as Police Chief Sprague
- John Ridgely as Tex Alexander
- Florence Bates as Katie
- Charles Trowbridge as Governor Phelps
- Cliff Clark as Police Captain Reddick
- Stanley Andrews as Lieutenant-Detective Pagle
- Howard Da Silva as Monson
- Wade Boteler as Police Captain Allen
- Ben Welden as Durkin
- Joe Downing as Benny McKaye
- Dick Rich as Big Dog
- Paul Phillips as Crips Vossen
- Joe King as Warden Morrell
- Paul Stanton as Prosecutor

== Reception ==
In a contemporary review, Variety gives the film a positive review: “This rates high among the average run of B mellers. It’s an evidence of Warners’ crime-and-punishment actioners working at an all-out peak. Everything in it has been seen before—particularly the sets—but the concoction has been tossed together again under director D. Ross Lederman to become a speedy and delectable dish.”

In a review bylined “T.S.”, The New York Times wrote: ”Latest addition to the "I wuz framed" school of cops-and-robbers epics is "Strange Alibi," ...More high-minded than original, the Warner Brothers are again searching out corruption in high places even if their hero is rooked of his freedom for a spell in the effort. .. But when dead men can provide alibis, when true love remains patient and when all the bullets fired at the hero seem made of nothing more dangerous than cream cheese, one can await the climax with calm. Despite a credible performance by Arthur Kennedy "Strange Alibi" is a not-too-alarming masquerade.”

== Bibliography ==
- Fetrow, Alan G. Feature Films, 1940-1949: a United States Filmography. McFarland, 1994.
