= Teddy, the Rough Rider =

1940 film

- Directed by: Ray Enright
- Written by: Charles L. Tedford
- Produced by: Gordon Hollingshead
- Starring: Sidney Blackmer; Pierre Watkin; Arthur Loft
- Narrated by: Charles Frederick Lindsley
- Cinematography: Ray Rennahan
- Edited by: Everett Dodd
- Music by: Howard Jackson
- Production company: Warner Bros.
- Distributed by: Warner Bros.
- Release date: February 24, 1940
- Running time: 19 minutes
- Country: United States
- Language: English

Teddy, the Rough Rider is a 1940 American short drama film directed by Ray Enright. It won an Oscar at the 13th Academy Awards for Best Short Subject (Two-Reel).

== Plot ==
In 1895, Theodore Roosevelt becomes New York City's police commissioner, where he radically reforms the police force and aggressively combats corruption despite resistance from powerful political bosses. U.S. President William McKinley appoints Roosevelt as Assistant Secretary of the Navy, who advocates for strengthening the U.S. military in anticipation of conflict with Spain. However, McKinley and U.S. Secretary of War Russell Alger disagree with Roosevelt's stance.

When the Spanish–American War breaks out, Roosevelt resigns his government post to organize and lead the volunteer cavalry regiment known as the Rough Riders. His victory during the Battle of San Juan Hill makes Roosevelt a national hero, paving his election as governor of New York in 1898.

Political leaders in New York dislike Roosevelt's ambitious agenda, and they convince McKinley to nominate him as vice president in the 1900 presidential election. McKinley and Roosevelt win the election. Their plan backfires when McKinley is assassinated, and Roosevelt unexpectedly becomes president. Sworn into office, Roosevelt enacts his domestic agenda, known as the Square Deal, and arbitrates a deal for coal miners on strike.

Roosevelt wins reelection in 1904. He initiates the construction of the Panama Canal and wins the 1906 Nobel Peace Prize for ending the Russo-Japanese War. In 1909, William Howard Taft succeeds Roosevelt as president. In 1914, World War I breaks out, and after the U.S. joins, Roosevelt's son Quentin is killed in battle. In his last years, he dictates a speech, outlining no compromise in pursuit of American interests, better living conditions, all subversive elements promoting foreign interest within the U.S. to be crushed, and a united loyalty among all Americans.

== Cast ==
- Sidney Blackmer as Theodore Roosevelt
- Pierre Watkin as Senator Platt
- Arthur Loft as Big Jim Rafferty
- Theodore von Eltz as William Loeb Jr.
- Clay Clement as Avery D. Andrews
- Douglas Wood as President William McKinley
- Robert Warwick as Captain Leonard Wood
- Selmer Jackson as John W. Riggs, Cabinet Member
- Edward McWade as Russell Alger, Secretary of War
- Edward Van Sloan as Elihu Root, Secretary of State (uncredited)
- Frank Mayo as Cabinet Member (uncredited)
- Jack Mower as Secretary (uncredited)
