= Roland Got =

American character actor

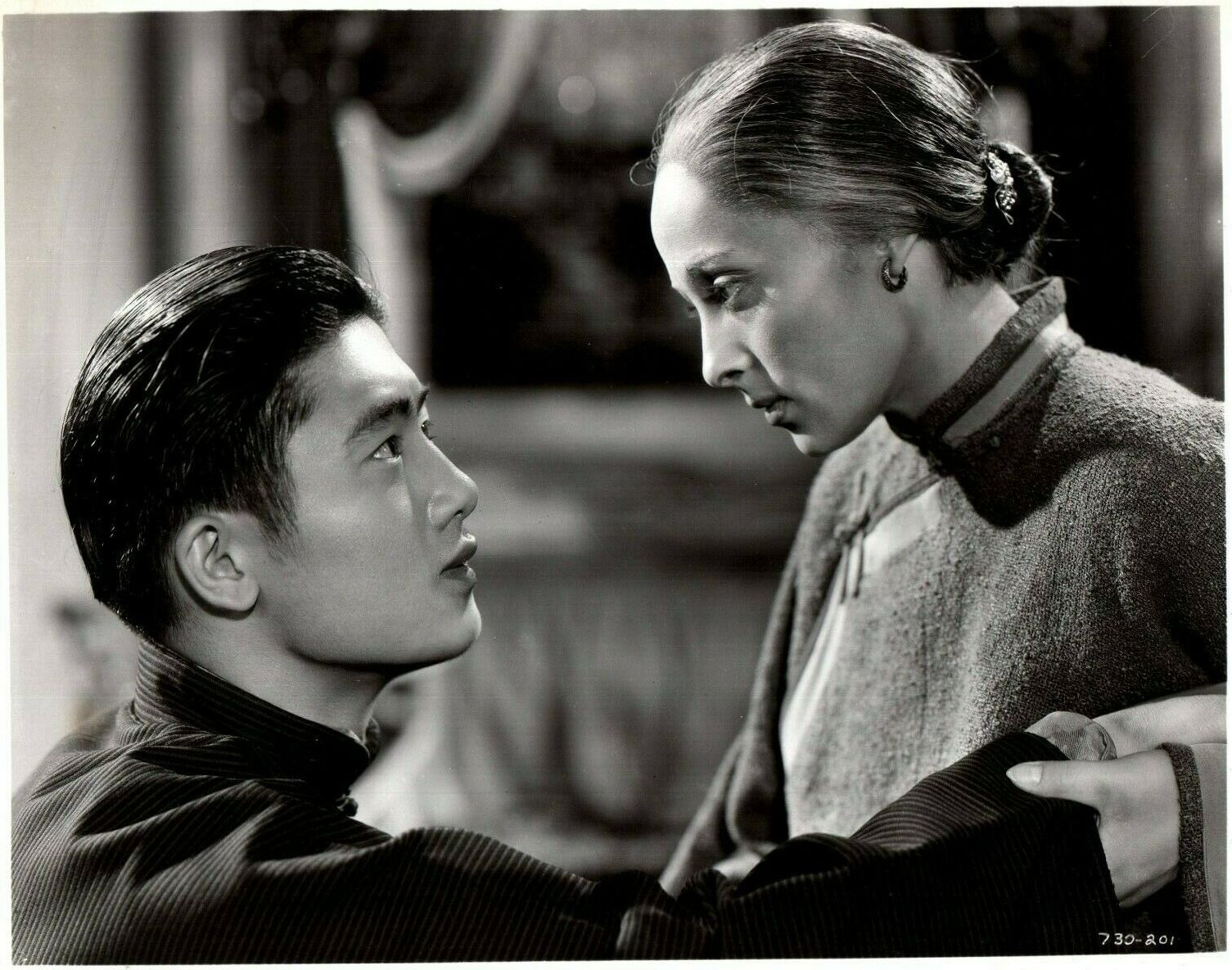
- Got and Luise Rainer in a publicity photo for The Good Earth (1937)
- Born: Roland Lui Got; August 6, 1916; San Francisco, California, US
- Died: November 30, 1948 (aged 32); San Francisco, California, US
- Education: Jefferson High School
- Occupation: Actor
- Spouse: Grace Yee Chew Got (Grace Got)
- Children: Herlinda Got Mahler

Roland Got (1916-1948) was a Chinese American character actor who worked in Hollywood during the 1930s and 1940s.

== Biography ==
Roland Got was born in San Francisco, California, in 1916 to William Got and Lilly Leong. His father, who immigrated from China, worked as a tailor, and his Chinese American mother was a seamstress. The family later moved to Los Angeles, where Roland and his siblings attended Jefferson High School. In L.A., Roland, a talented artist, also played on a semi-professional football team.

After high school, Got signed a contract with Metro-Goldwyn-Mayer and trained at the Motion Picture Academy. His big break came when he was cast in the 1937 film The Good Earth. He eventually appeared in nearly twenty films. He married Grace Chew, and together they had a daughter. His film career came to an end during World War II when he was drafted into the U.S. Army and sent to Europe.

After the war, Got began working in insurance sales. In late 1948, at the age of 32, he drowned after falling overboard from the ferry Sacramento while crossing San Francisco Bay. Roland Got was buried at Golden Gate National Cemetery in San Bruno, California.

== Filmography ==
Year	Title	Role	Notes
1937	The Good Earth	Younger Son	Uncredited
1938	Extortion	Kong Lee	
1938	The Night Hawk	Willie Sing	
1940	Strike Up the Band	Morgan's House Boy	Uncredited
1940	The Letter	Minor Role	Uncredited
1941	They Met in Bombay	Young Foo Sing	Uncredited
1941	Passage from Hong Kong	Clerk	Uncredited
1941	Secret of the Wastelands	Yeng	
1941	The Shanghai Gesture	Kim Chee	Uncredited
1942	Bombay Clipper	Bellhop	Uncredited
1942	Submarine Raider	Kenichi	Uncredited
1942	Across the Pacific	Sugi	
1943	G-Men vs. the Black Dragon	Agent Chang Sing	Serial
1943	The Amazing Mrs. Holliday	Dr. Ku	Uncredited
1943	The Man from Down Under	Japanese Soldier	Uncredited
1943	We've Never Been Licked	Matsui	
1943	Around the World	Rickshaw Driver	Uncredited
1943	Destination Tokyo	Japanese Officer	Uncredited
1944	Dragon Seed	Speaker with Movies	Uncredited, (final film role)
