= Fred Niblo Jr. =

American screenwriter

- Born: January 23, 1903; New York City, U.S.
- Died: February 18, 1973 (aged 70); Encino, Los Angeles, California, U.S.
- Education: United States Military Academy
- Occupation: Screenwriter
- Years active: 1930–1950
- Spouse: Patricia Henry
- Children: 1 son and 2 daughters
- Parent(s): Fred Niblo; Josephine Cohan

Fred Niblo Jr. (January 23, 1903 – February 18, 1973) was an American screenwriter. He was nominated for an Academy Award for Best Adapted Screenplay for the film The Criminal Code (1931) together with Seton I. Miller. Niblo retired from films in 1950 to become a businessman.

== Life and career ==
Fred Niblo Jr. was born in New York City on January 23, 1903. He was a son of Hollywood director Fred Niblo and vaudeville entertainer Josephine Cohan, who was an older sister of Broadway legend George M. Cohan. He had studied at the United States Military Academy in West Point, New York, before going to Hollywood in 1928.

Niblo began his career in 1930 and received an Oscar nomination for The Criminal Code, one of his first screenplays, at the 4th Academy Awards in 1932.

In a career spanning 20 years, Niblo had about 57 credits, including Penitentiary (1938), No Place to Go (1939), The Fighting 69th (1940), Strange Alibi (1941), Four Jills in a Jeep (1944), and Incident (1949). After several years on the Columbia Pictures writing staff, he moved to Warner Bros. and spent the last decade of his career at RKO Pictures and 20th Century Fox.

Niblo was married to Patricia Henry (1910–1998) until his death in 1973. They had two daughters, Moira and Ann, and a son, Dennis.

Niblo died at Encino Emergency Hospital in Encino on February 18, 1973.

== Filmography ==
- The Criminal Code (1930)
- The Woman Racket (1930)
- The Virtuous Husband (1931)
- King of the Jungle (1933)
- Ladies Must Love (1933)
- Flying Down to Rio (1933)
- As Husbands Go (1934)
- Fugitive Lady (1934)
- Among the Missing (1934)
- Name the Woman (1934)
- The Hell Cat (1934)
- Operator 13 (1934)
- Whom the Gods Destroy (1934)
- Death Flies East (1935)
- Unknown Woman (1935)
- Escape from Devil's Island (1935)
- You May Be Next (1936)
- Roaming Lady (1936)
- The Man Who Lived Twice (1936)
- Lady from Nowhere (1936)
- Find the Witness (1937)
- Motor Madness (1937)
- The Game That Kills (1937)
- Counsel for Crime (1937)
- All American Sweetheart (1937)
- Little Miss Roughneck (1938)
- Penitentiary (1938)
- City Streets (1938)
- No Place to Go (1939)
- Hell's Kitchen (1939)
- Waterfront (1939)
- The Cowboy Quarterback (1939)
- East of the River (1940)
- River's End (1940)
- A Fugitive from Justice (1940)
- An Angel from Texas (1940)
- The Fighting 69th (1940)
- Strange Alibi (1941)
- Father's Son (1941)
- The Wagons Roll at Night (1941)
- Three Sons o' Guns (1941)
- Nine Lives Are Not Enough (1941)
- Passage from Hong Kong (1941)
- You're in the Army Now (1941)
- You Can't Escape Forever (1942)
- The Falcon in Danger (1943)
- Four Jills in a Jeep (1944)
- Tampico (1944)
- Bodyguard (1948)
- In This Corner (1948)
- Incident (1948)
- Convicted (1950)
