= The Game That Kills =

1937 film by D. Ross Lederman

- Film poster
- Directed by: D. Ross Lederman
- Screenplay by: Grace Neville; Fred Niblo Jr.
- Story by: J. Benton Cheney
- Produced by: Harry L. Decker
- Starring: Charles Quigley; Rita Hayworth
- Cinematography: Benjamin Kline
- Edited by: James Sweeney
- Production company: Columbia Pictures
- Distributed by: Columbia Pictures
- Release date: September 21, 1937
- Running time: 55 minutes
- Country: United States
- Language: English

The Game That Kills is a 1937 American mystery sport film directed by D. Ross Lederman and starring Charles Quigley and Rita Hayworth.

== Plot ==
After his brother is killed on the ice during a hockey game, Alex Ferguson, convinced it was no accident, goes undercover as a new player to discover the truth.

Alex falls for Betty Holland, the coach's daughter. He ultimately learns that team owner Maxwell is in cahoots with gamblers, as are a couple of his players, and coach Joe Holland is in debt to them. Betty takes a job at a newspaper and endeavors to clear her dad's name while Alex survives a dangerous game, followed by a confrontation with the crooks.

== Cast ==
- Charles Quigley as Alex Ferguson
- Rita Hayworth as Betty Holland
- John Gallaudet as Sam Erskine
- J. Farrell MacDonald as Joe Holland
- Arthur Loft as Rudy Maxwell
- John Tyrrell as Eddie
- Paul Fix as Dick Adams
- Max Hoffman Jr. as Bill Drake
- Dick Wessel as 'Leapfrog' Soule

== See also ==
- List of films about ice hockey
