= Counsel for Crime =

1937 film by John Brahm

- Theatrical release poster
- Directed by: John Brahm
- Screenplay by: Fred Niblo, Jr. Grace Neville; Lee Loeb; Harold Buchman
- Based on: a story by Harold Shumate
- Produced by: Wallace MacDonald
- Starring: Otto Kruger; Douglass Montgomery; Jacqueline Wells
- Cinematography: Henry Freulich
- Edited by: Otto Meyer
- Music by: Morris Stoloff
- Distributed by: Columbia Pictures
- Release date: October 14, 1937 (United States)
- Running time: 61 minutes
- Country: United States
- Language: English

Counsel for Crime is a 1937 American crime film directed by John Brahm starring Otto Kruger, Douglass Montgomery and Jacqueline Wells.

== Plot ==
Following his graduation from law school, Senator Robert Maddox's (Hall) adopted son Paul (Montgomery) is offered a job at Bill Mellon's (Kruger) law firm. Mellon, an unscrupulous criminal lawyer, is actually Paul's real father, but he keeps the fact a secret from him. When Paul discovers Mellon's corruption, he quits and lands a job as assistant district attorney.

Soon after taking the position, Paul spearheads a state investigation into legal malpractice. This worries Mellon and prompts him to assign a criminal to implicate those investigating him in a scandal. When the criminal learns about Paul's birth, he is accidentally shot by Mellon in an effort to conceal the information. Paul successfully prosecutes his own father, who is convicted of second-degree murder because he refuses to discuss the content of the papers over which he and Mitchell were struggling, thus protecting Paul and his mother.

== Cast ==
- Otto Kruger as Bill Mellon
- Douglass Montgomery as Paul Maddox
- Jacqueline Wells as Ann McIntyre
- Thurston Hall as Senator Robert Maddox
- Nana Bryant as Mrs. Maddox
- Gene Morgan as Friday
- Marc Lawrence as Edwin Mitchell
- Robert Warwick as Asa Stewart
- Stanley Fields as George Evans
