= Woman in Distress =

1937 film by Lynn Shores

- Theatrical release poster
- Directed by: Lynn Shores
- Screenplay by: Albert DeMond
- Story by: Edwin Olmstead
- Produced by: Ralph Cohn
- Starring: May Robson; Irene Hervey; Dean Jagger; Douglass Dumbrille; George McKay; Gene Morgan
- Cinematography: Allen G. Siegler
- Edited by: Byron Robinson
- Production company: Columbia Pictures
- Distributed by: Columbia Pictures
- Release date: January 17, 1937
- Running time: 58 minutes
- Country: United States
- Language: English

Woman in Distress is a 1937 American crime film directed by Lynn Shores and written by Albert DeMond. The film stars May Robson, Irene Hervey, Dean Jagger, Douglass Dumbrille, George McKay and Gene Morgan. The film was released on January 17, 1937, by Columbia Pictures.

== Cast ==
- May Robson as Phoebe Tuttle
- Irene Hervey as Irene Donovan
- Dean Jagger as Fred Stevens
- Douglass Dumbrille as Jerome Culver
- George McKay as Sergeant Casey
- Gene Morgan as 'Slug' Bemis
- Paul Fix as Joe Emory
- Frank Sheridan as Inspector Roderick
- Charles C. Wilson as Herbert Glaxton
- Arthur Loft as Stewart Sadler
- Wallis Clark as Mervyn Seymour
