= All American Sweetheart =

- Theatrical release poster
- Directed by: Lambert Hillyer
- Screenplay by: Grace Neville; Fred Niblo Jr. Michael L. Simmons
- Story by: Robert E. Kent
- Produced by: Wallace MacDonald
- Starring: Patricia Farr; Scott Kolk; Gene Morgan; James Eagles; Arthur Loft; Joe Twerp
- Cinematography: Benjamin H. Kline
- Edited by: James Sweeney
- Production company: Columbia Pictures
- Distributed by: Columbia Pictures
- Release date: December 20, 1937
- Running time: 62 minutes
- Country: United States
- Language: English

All American Sweetheart is a 1937 American crime film directed by Lambert Hillyer and written by Grace Neville, Fred Niblo Jr. and Michael L. Simmons. The film stars Patricia Farr, Scott Kolk, Gene Morgan, James Eagles, Arthur Loft and Joe Twerp. The film was released on December 20, 1937, by Columbia Pictures.

== Cast ==
- Patricia Farr as Connie Adams
- Scott Kolk as Lance Corbett
- Gene Morgan as Coach Dolan
- James Eagles as 'Squirt' Adams
- Arthur Loft as Cap Collender
- Joe Twerp as 'Giblets' Offenbach
- Ruth Hilliard as Amy Goss
- Donald Briggs as Johnny Ames
- Louis DaPron as Andy Carter
- Joseph Allen as Joe Collins
- Frank C. Wilson as Alfred
- Deane Janis as Singer
