= Grace Neville (screenwriter) =

American screenwriter

- Born: June 6, 1898; Chattanooga, Tennessee, United States
- Died: March 31, 1973 (aged 74); Los Angeles, California; United States
- Occupation: Writer
- Years active: 1935–1938 (film)

Grace Neville (1898–1973) was an American screenwriter.

== Biography ==
Grace Neville was born in Chattanooga, Tennessee, to Benjamin Neville and Helen Turnell. She was added to the scenario department at Columbia Pictures in 1935. She later served as an officer in the Hollywood Studio Club, which aimed to prepare women for careers in the film industry. Neville — who never married — died in West Hollywood, where she resided, in 1973.

== Selected filmography ==
- Little Miss Roughneck (1938)
- All American Sweetheart (1937)
- Counsel for Crime (1937)
- The Game That Kills (1937)
- Motor Madness (1937)
- Find the Witness (1937)
- Shakedown (1936)
- Dangerous Intrigue (1936)
- Air Hawks (1935)

== Bibliography ==
- Larry Langman & Daniel Finn. A Guide to American Crime Films of the Thirties. Greenwood Press, 1995.
