= Air Hawks =

1935 film by Albert S. Rogell

- Theatrical film poster
- Directed by: Albert Rogell
- Screenplay by: Griffin Jay and Grace Neville
- Produced by: none credited
- Starring: Ralph Bellamy; Tala Birell; Wiley Post; Douglas Dumbrille
- Cinematography: Henry Freulich, A.S.C.
- Edited by: Richard Cahoon
- Music by: Louis Silvers (uncredited)
- Production company: A Columbia Production
- Distributed by: Columbia Pictures Corporation
- Release date: May 7, 1935
- Running time: 64 minutes (also variously listed as 66, 69 and 70 minutes)
- Country: United States
- Language: English

Air Hawks is a 1935 American aviation-themed horror science fiction film based on Ben Pivar's "Air Fury", an unpublished story. Director Albert Rogell who had moved from shorts to B-films, was interested in aviation and had already helmed The Flying Marine (1929) and Air Hostess (1933). In Air Hawks, the studio was able to add an A-list star, Ralph Bellamy, as well as exploiting the fame of record-setting pilot Wiley Post in his only feature film appearance.

Although limited in budget and production values, the introduction of a "death ray" elevated the modest programmer into the science-fiction genre.

== Plot ==
Pilot Barry Eldon (Ralph Bellamy) is the owner of Independent Transcontinental Lines whose airline is in direct competition with Martin Drewen (Robert Middlemass), owner of Consolidated Airlines. With Renee Dupont (Tala Birell), a singer at a nightclub owned by Victor Arnold (Douglas Dumbrille), he believes that his airline's air mail routes will ensure success against his rival.

Arnold decides to ally himself with Drewen who has hired German inventor Shulter (Edward Van Sloan), the inventor of a death ray projector. With this device, they bring down three of Eldon's aircraft. Determined to set a new transcontinental record with Wiley Post flying the racer, Eldon has the help of his girlfriend to eventually expose his rivals and destroy their secret headquarters. A new contract in Washington awaits.

== Cast ==
- Ralph Bellamy as Barry
- Tala Birell as Renee
- Wiley Post as himself
- Douglas Dumbrille as Arnold
- Robert Allen as Lewis
- Billie Seward as Mona
- Victor Kilian as Tiny
- Robert Middlemass as Drewen
- Geneva Mitchell as Gertie
- Wyrley Birch as Holden
- Edward Van Sloan as Shulter
- Egon Brecher as Leon

(Note: Unbilled (in order of appearance): Niles Welch as McCoy, Barry's radio dispatcher; Marianne Edwards as Dorothy, 5-year-old daughter of pilot Frank Dunlap and his wife Gertie; Pat Flaherty as Frank Dunlap, one of Barry's pilots; Joseph Sauers as another one of Barry's pilots; Roscoe Turner as yet another pilot working for Barry; William Irving as Jerry, still another of Barry's pilots; Harry Strang as driver of stalled taxi in which Renee is a passenger; Gino Corrado as headwaiter at nightclub where Renee is a singer; Al Hill as Pete, Shulter's henchman in shooting down Barry's planes; Franklin Parker as Ed Burbank, one of Barry's pilots who was shot down by Shulter's death ray; Elise Cavanna as severe bespectacled nurse attending to Lewis in the hospital; Guy Usher as Shelton, first of two Federal men from the Department of Commerce who comes to visit Barry; James Farley as Harrington, second of two Federal men from the Department of Commerce who comes to visit Barry; Charles C. Wilson as newspaper editor who fires Tiny for refusing to write a story implying that Barry's planes are unsafe; Billy West as one of five newspaper reporters throwing questions at Mona and demanding access to Barry; Inez Courtney as nurse who answers Barry's telephone inquiry about Lewis' health; Frank O'Connor as bystander when ambulance arrives at Barry's apartment to pick up Renee; Charles King as driver of ambulance which arrives at Barry's apartment to pick up Renee)

== Production ==
Wiley Post only appeared briefly in Air Hawks, but his fame as a pilot was intended to help "sell" the film.

Primary photography on Air Hawks took place from February 25 to March 14, 1935. The aerial scenes used a combination of models and full-size aircraft, which included a DH60GM Gipsy Moth, Stearman C-3R, Stinson SM-8A, and Vultee V-1.

Billed as one of the stars of the film, Wiley Post was in the midst of a series of record flights. His actual screen time amounted to little more than a minute.

Between February 22 and June 15, 1935, Post made four attempts to complete the first high altitude non-stop flight from Los Angeles to New York, all of which failed for various mechanical reasons. As the attempts were also meant to be the "First Air Mail Stratosphere Flight" over U.S. Air Mail Route #2 (AM-2) from Los Angeles to New York, Post was in the headlines constantly, an aspect that Columbia wanted to exploit, even creating a marketing campaign featuring his famous "Winnie Mae". The film provides a rare view of a famous pilot on the cusp of tragedy. In mid-1935, after his work on Air Hawks was completed, Post with friend and fellow celebrity Will Rogers set out on another record flight, this time surveying a mail-and-passenger air route from the west coast of the United States to Russia. When the pair were killed on August 15, 1935, near Point Barrow, Alaska, a period of public mourning began.

== Reception ==
Considered along with other aviation films of the era, Air Hawks was a B-film with some aspirations to being elevated to a more prestigious level, especially promoting the appearance of headline-dominating Wiley Post.

A contemporary review in The New York Times, however, noted: "Although Wiley Post is billed as one of the photoplay's chief lures, the aviator completes his chore in about a minute and a half. Air Hawks spends most of its time on the minor side of film entertainment. It belongs in the double-feature programs, for which it has apparently been designed." Largely a forgotten film today, Air Hawks does provide an illuminating, if brief look at an iconic figure of the interwar years.
