= Shakedown (1936 film) =

1936 film directed by David Selman

- Directed by: David Selman
- Screenplay by: Grace Neville
- Story by: Barry Shipman
- Produced by: Harry L. Decker
- Starring: Lew Ayres; Joan Perry; Thurston Hall
- Cinematography: Henry Freulich
- Edited by: Gene Milford
- Production company: Columbia Pictures
- Release date: July 17, 1936 (US)
- Running time: 57 minutes
- Country: United States
- Language: English

Shakedown is a 1936 American crime drama film, directed by David Selman from a screenplay by Grace Neville based on a story by Barry Shipman. The film stars Lew Ayres, Joan Perry, and Thurston Hall, and was released on July 17, 1936. This was Perry's film debut.

== Cast list ==
- Lew Ayres as Bob Sanderson
- Joan Perry as Edith Stuart
- Thurston Hall as G. Gregory Stuart
- Victor Kilian as Caretaker
- Henry Mollison as Ralph Gurney
- John Gallaudet as Hawsley
- George McKay as Spud
- Gene Morgan as Presto Mullins
- Wyrley Birch as Mr. Morrison
- William Gould as Lieutenant
- Wade Boteler as Captain of detectives
- Edward Le Saint as Attorney
- Olaf Hytten as Butler
- George Offerman Jr. as Pat O'Roark
- Arthur Loft as Editor
- Murdock MacQuarrie as Attendant
- George French as Husband in cafe
- Helen Dickson as Wife in cafe
- Jack Dougherty as Detective
- Lee Shumway as Detective
- Bruce Mitchell as Plainclothes man
- Lee Prather as Desk sergeant
- Dick Allen as Assistant detective
- Frank Bull as Police broadcaster
- Ralph McCullough as Dispatcher
- Maurice Brierre as Waiter
- Albert Pollet as Head waiter
- Bob Burns as Pawnbroker
