= Panic on the Air =

1936 film

- Directed by: D. Ross Lederman
- Screenplay by: Harold Shumate
- Based on: Five Spot story by Theodore A. Tinsley
- Starring: Lew Ayres
- Cinematography: Benjamin H. Kline
- Edited by: James Sweeney
- Distributed by: Columbia Pictures
- Release date: April 10, 1936
- Running time: 54 minutes
- Country: United States
- Language: English

Panic on the Air is a 1936 American drama film directed by D. Ross Lederman and starring Lew Ayres.

== Cast ==
- Lew Ayres as Jerry Franklin
- Florence Rice as Mary Connor a.k.a. Cremer
- Benny Baker as Andy
- Edwin Maxwell as Gordon
- Charles C. Wilson as Chief Insp. Fitzgerald
- Murray Alper as Marvin Danker
- Wyrley Birch as Maj. Bliss
- Robert Emmett Keane as Cillani
- Gene Morgan as Lefty Dugan
- Eddie Lee as McNulty
