= Extortion (1938 film) =

- Theatrical release poster
- Directed by: Lambert Hillyer
- Written by: Earl Felton
- Starring: Scott Colton; Mary Russell; Thurston Hall; Arthur Loft
- Cinematography: Benjamin Kline
- Edited by: Gene Havlick
- Production company: Columbia Pictures
- Distributed by: Columbia Pictures
- Release date: May 9, 1938
- Running time: 61 minutes
- Country: United States
- Language: English

Extortion is a 1938 mystery film directed by Lambert Hillyer. It was produced by Columbia Pictures.

== Cast ==
- Scott Kolk as Larry Campbell
- Mary Russell as Betty Tisdelle
- Thurston Hall as Professor Tisdelle
- Arthur Loft as Nat Corrigan
- Gene Morgan as Flashlight
- Frank C. Wilson as Craig Banning
- Ann Doran as Margie Blake
- J. Farrell MacDonald as Coach Pearson
- George Offerman Jr. as Soupy Petite
- Nick Lukats as Roy Jennings
- Roland Got as Kong Lee
- Albert Dekker as Jeffrey Thompson
- Ruth Hilliard as Babs
- Edward Keane as Brooks
- C. Montague Shaw as Dean Latham

== Reception ==
A contemporary review in The Film Daily praised the cast and director, saying that it had "very few dull moments".

A contemporary review in Variety was less positive, calling it an unimpressive and poorly executed film.
