= You May Be Next =

1936 film by Albert S. Rogell

- Directed by: Albert S. Rogell
- Written by: Fred Niblo Jr.; Ferdinand Reyher; James Whale
- Produced by: Sid Rogell; Robert North
- Starring: Ann Sothern; Lloyd Nolan; Douglass Dumbrille
- Cinematography: Allen G. Siegler
- Edited by: John Rawlins
- Production company: Columbia Pictures
- Distributed by: Columbia Pictures
- Release date: February 6, 1936
- Running time: 66 minutes
- Country: United States
- Language: English

You May Be Next is a 1936 American crime film directed by Albert S. Rogell. Starring Ann Sothern, Lloyd Nolan and Douglass Dumbrille. It was produced and distributed by Columbia Pictures. The film's sets were designed by the art director Stephen Goosson.

== Cast ==
- Ann Sothern as Fay Stevens
- Lloyd Nolan as Neil Bennett
- Douglass Dumbrille as Beau Gardner
- John Arledge as Eddie House
- Berton Churchill as J.J. Held
- Nana Bryant as Miss Abbott
- Robert Middlemass as Dan McMahon
- George McKay as Mitch Cook
- Gene Morgan as Ted Lene
- Clyde Dilson as Nick Barrow

== Bibliography ==
- Michael Schlossheimer. Gunmen and Gangsters: Profiles of Nine Actors Who Portrayed Memorable Screen Tough Guys. McFarland, 2001.
