= Super Speed (1935 film) =

- Film poster
- Directed by: Lambert Hillyer
- Written by: Harold Shumate
- Produced by: Irving Briskin
- Starring: Norman Foster; Florence Rice; Mary Carlisle; Charley Grapewin
- Cinematography: Benjamin Kline
- Edited by: Otto Meyer
- Production company: Columbia Pictures
- Distributed by: Columbia Pictures
- Release date: December 2, 1935
- Running time: 56 minutes
- Country: United States
- Language: English

Super Speed is a 1935 sports film directed by Lambert Hillyer. The film was produced and distributed by Columbia Pictures.

== Cast ==
- Norman Foster as Randy Rogers
- Florence Rice as Billie Devlin
- Mary Carlisle as Nan Gale
- Charley Grapewin as Terry Devlin
- Arthur Hohl as Philip Norton
- Robert Middlemass as Wilson Gale
- George McKay as George Stone
- Gene Morgan as Master of ceremonies
- Edward Earle as Holmes
- Emmett Vogan as Ward

== Reception ==
A review in a December 1935 edition of The Film Daily criticized the film for having a dull storyline.

A review in a December 1935 edition of Variety was critical of Norman Foster's performance, but praised Mary Carlisle and Florence Rice's performance. The review also praised the cinematography.
