= Motor Madness (film) =

1937 film

- Directed by: D. Ross Lederman
- Written by: Fred Niblo Jr. Grace Neville
- Produced by: Irving Briskin; Harry L. Decker
- Starring: Joseph Allen; Rosalind Keith; J.M. Kerrigan
- Cinematography: Allen G. Siegler
- Edited by: Byron Robinson
- Production company: Columbia Pictures
- Distributed by: Columbia Pictures
- Release date: April 5, 1937
- Running time: 61 minutes
- Country: United States
- Language: English

Motor Madness is a 1937 American drama film directed by D. Ross Lederman and starring Joseph Allen, Rosalind Keith and J.M. Kerrigan.

== Plot ==
After speedboat racing champion Joe Dunn wins a preliminary race, he is offered a bribe to deliberately lose the race for the championship. A fight ensues, and Joe is jailed and his girlfriend, Peggy McNeil, replaces him in the race.

Peggy crashes the boat and is seriously injured. Joe gets out of jail and desperately seeks money to pay for an operation to save Peggy's life.

== Cast ==
- Joseph Allen as Joe Dunn
- Rosalind Keith as Peggy McNeil
- J. M. Kerrigan as Henry John 'Cap' McNeil
- Marc Lawrence as Gus Slater
- Richard Terry as Nick Givens
- Arthur Loft as 'Lucky' Leonard Raymond
- Joe Sawyer as Steve Dolan (as Joseph Sawyer)
- George Ernest as 'Pancho', Runaway Kid
- Al Hill as Henchman Jeff Skinner
- John Tyrrell as Pete Bailey
- Ralph Byrd as C.P.O. Mike Burns
