= A Woman Is the Judge =

- Theatrical release poster
- Directed by: Nick Grinde
- Written by: Alexandre Bisson, Karl Brown
- Produced by: Irving Briskin, Ralph Cohn
- Starring: Frieda Inescort, Otto Kruger, Rochelle Hudson, Mayo Methot, Gordon Oliver, Arthur Loft
- Cinematography: Benjamin H. Kline
- Edited by: Byron Robinson
- Production company: Columbia Pictures
- Release date: July 10, 1939 (United States)
- Running time: 61 min
- Country: United States
- Language: English

A Woman Is the Judge is an American 1939 drama film directed by Nick Grinde and starring Frieda Inescort, Otto Kruger, Rochelle Hudson, Mayo Methot, Gordon Oliver, and Arthur Loft. The film tagline is Love bridges the gulf between a judge and an underworld girl. This is an early film exploring such themes as gender equality and female lawyers. The film is based on the play by Alexandre Bisson.

== Plot ==
A famous female lawyer at the peak of her career has to resign in order to defend her estranged daughter, with whom she lost any contact some 20 years ago, against a murder charge. A prosecuting attorney has a secret crush on the judge.

== Cast ==
- Frieda Inescort as Mary Cabot
- Otto Kruger as Steven Graham
- Rochelle Hudson as Justine West
- Mayo Methot as Gertie
- Gordon Oliver as Robert Langley
- Arthur Loft as Tim Ryan
- Walter Fenner as Harper
- John Dilson as Ramsey
- Ben Hewlett as Wolf
- Beryl Mercer as Mrs. Butler
