= Counterfeit Lady =

1936 film

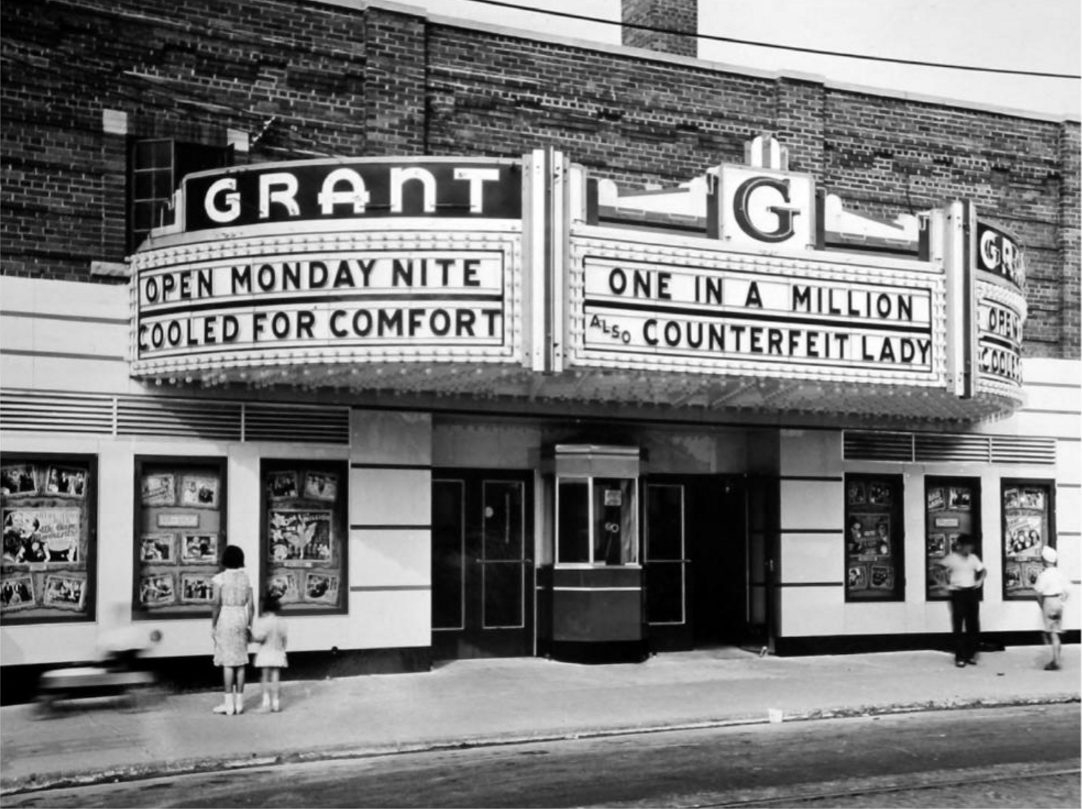
- Counterfeit Lady being shown at a Canadian theater in 1940
- Directed by: D. Ross Lederman
- Written by: Tom Van Dycke; Harold Shumate
- Starring: Ralph Bellamy
- Cinematography: Allen G. Siegler
- Edited by: James Sweeney
- Distributed by: Columbia Pictures
- Release date: December 31, 1936
- Running time: 58 minutes
- Country: United States
- Language: English

Counterfeit Lady is a 1936 American comedy film directed by D. Ross Lederman.

== Cast ==
- Ralph Bellamy as Johnny Pierce
- Joan Perry as Phyllis Fowler
- Douglass Dumbrille as August Marino
- George McKay as Pinky
- Gene Morgan as Clancy
- Henry Mollison as Bemis
- John Tyrrell as Mike
- Max Hoffman Jr. as Kit
- Edward LeSaint as Girard
- John Harrington as Swanson

== Critical reception ==
Variety wrote that although the film contained "several first-rate performances" it was hindered by "an absurd opening", "uneven pace" and "counterfeit situations, actions and locales", and that "chief blame should go perhaps to D. Ross Lederman’s unoriginal direction." The reviewer noted that Ralph Bellamy, Douglass Dumbrille and George McKay delivered good performances and that Joan Perry "displays rare charm and unexpected thespian ability."
