= The Main Event (1938 film) =

1938 film directed by Danny Dare

- Theatrical poster for the film
- Directed by: Danny Dare
- Screenplay by: Lee Loeb
- Story by: Harold Shumate
- Produced by: Ralph Cohn
- Starring: Robert Paige; Jacqueline Wells; Arthur Loft
- Cinematography: Allen G. Siegler
- Edited by: Al Clark
- Production company: Columbia Pictures
- Release date: May 5, 1938 (US)
- Running time: 55 minutes
- Country: United States
- Language: English

The Main Event is a 1938 American comedy-drama film directed by Danny Dare, which stars Robert Paige, Jacqueline Wells, and Arthur Loft.

== Cast ==
- Robert Paige as Mac Richards
- Jacqueline Wells as Helen Phillips
- Arthur Loft as Jack Benson
- John Gallaudet as Joe Carter
- Thurston Hall as Captain Phillips
- Gene Morgan as Lefty
- Dick Curtis as Sawyer
- Oscar O'Shea as Captain Rorty
- Pat Flaherty as Moran
- John Tyrrel as Steve
- Nick Copeland as Jake
- Lester Dorr as Buck
- Leora Thatcher as Landlady
- Edward J. LeSaint as Watchman
