= End of the Trail (1936 film) =

1936 film by Erle C. Kenton

- Directed by: Erle C. Kenton
- Written by: Zane Grey (novel); Harold Shumate
- Produced by: Irving Briskin; Ben Pivar
- Starring: Jack Holt; Louise Henry; Douglass Dumbrille
- Cinematography: John Stumar; Benjamin H. Kline
- Edited by: Al Clark
- Production company: Columbia Pictures
- Distributed by: Columbia Pictures
- Release date: October 11, 1936
- Running time: 70 minutes
- Country: United States
- Language: English

End of the Trail is a 1936 American Western film directed by Erle C. Kenton and starring Jack Holt, Louise Henry and Douglass Dumbrille.

== Partial cast ==
- Jack Holt as Dale Brittenham
- Louise Henry as Belle Pearson
- Douglass Dumbrille as Bill Mason
- Guinn 'Big Boy' Williams as Bob Hildreth
- George MacKay as Ben Parker
- Gene Morgan as Cheyenne
- John McGuire as Larry Pearson
- Edward LeSaint as Jim Watrous
- Frank Shannon as Sheriff Anderson
- Erle C. Kenton as Theodore Roosevelt

== Bibliography ==
- Goble, Alan. The Complete Index to Literary Sources in Film. Walter de Gruyter, 1999.
