= Arthur Loft =

American actor (1897–1947)

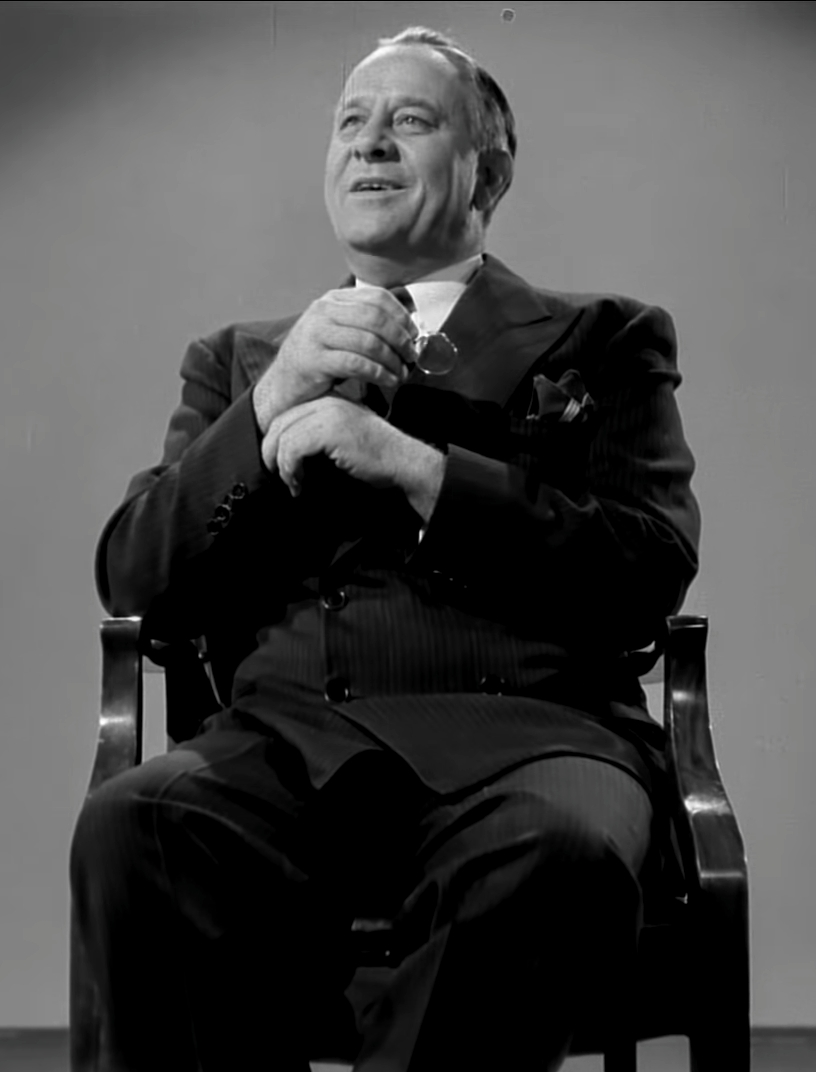
- Loft in Scarlet Street (1945)
- Born: Hans Peter Loft; May 25, 1897; Denver, Colorado, U.S.
- Died: January 1, 1947 (aged 49); Los Angeles, California, U.S.
- Resting place: Forest Lawn Memorial Park, Glendale, California
- Occupation: Actor
- Years active: 1932–1947
- Spouse(s): Daisy Dell Wilcox (m. 1925; his death)

Arthur Loft (born Hans Peter Loft; May 25, 1897 – January 1, 1947) was an American film and stage actor. He appeared in more than 220 films between 1932 and 1947.

== Biography ==
He was born in Denver, Colorado and died in Los Angeles, California. He is interred at Glendale's Forest Lawn Memorial Park Cemetery.

== Career ==
In 1931, Loft performed with the Hale-Munier Players.

== Selected filmography ==
- Behind Jury Doors (1932)
- Alimony Madness (1933)
- Western Justice (1934)
- Paradise Valley (1934)
- Girl in the Case (1934)
- Danger Ahead (1935)
- Wanted! Jane Turner (1936)
- King of the Royal Mounted (1936)
- Shakedown (1936)
- All American Sweetheart (1937)
- The Great Barrier (1937)
- Paid to Dance (1937)
- Motor Madness (1937)
- Extortion (1938)
- The Main Event (1938)
- Rawhide (1938)
- Rhythm of the Saddle (1938)
- Squadron of Honor (1938)
- Cafe Hostess (1939)
- A Woman Is the Judge (1939)
- Teddy, the Rough Rider (1940)
- Colorado (1940)
- Glamour for Sale (1940)
- North from the Lone Star (1941)
- The Green Hornet Strikes Again! (1941)
- Caught in the Draft (1941)
- Down Mexico Way (1941)
- The Magnificent Dope (1942)
- The Glass Key (1942)
- Street of Chance (1942) - Sheriff Lew Stebbins
- Let's Face It (1943)
- Louisiana Hayride (1944)
- The Woman in the Window (1944)
- She Gets Her Man (1945)
- The Man from Oklahoma (1945)
- Scarlet Street (1945) - Dellarowe
- It's a Pleasure (1945) - Jack Weimar
- Blondie Knows Best (1946)
