= Alibi for Murder =

1936 film

- Film poster
- Directed by: D. Ross Lederman
- Screenplay by: Tom Van Dycke
- Produced by: Ralph Cohn
- Starring: William Gargan; Marguerite Churchill; Gene Morgan
- Cinematography: George Meehan
- Edited by: William A. Lyon
- Production company: Columbia Pictures
- Distributed by: Columbia Pictures
- Release date: September 23, 1936
- Running time: 59 minutes
- Country: United States
- Language: English

Alibi for Murder is a 1936 American crime film directed by D. Ross Lederman and starring William Gargan, Marguerite Churchill and Gene Morgan.

== Plot ==
A radio newsman investigates the murder of a well-known inventor.

== Cast ==
- William Gargan as Perry Travis
- Marguerite Churchill as Lois Allen
- Gene Morgan as Brainy Barker
- Romaine Callender as E.J. Easton
- Egon Brecher as Sir Conrad Stava
- Drue Leyton as Norma Foster
- Wade Boteler as Police L.t. Conroy
- Dwight Frye as McBride
- Raymond Lawrence as Harkness

== Critical reception ==
Lionel Collier, for the British magazine, Picturegoer, described the film as "a modest thriller", and commented, "Red herrings are too plentifully drawn across the trail and artifice is too apparent to make the film more than mildly entertaining."
