= Gene Morgan =

American actor (1893–1940)

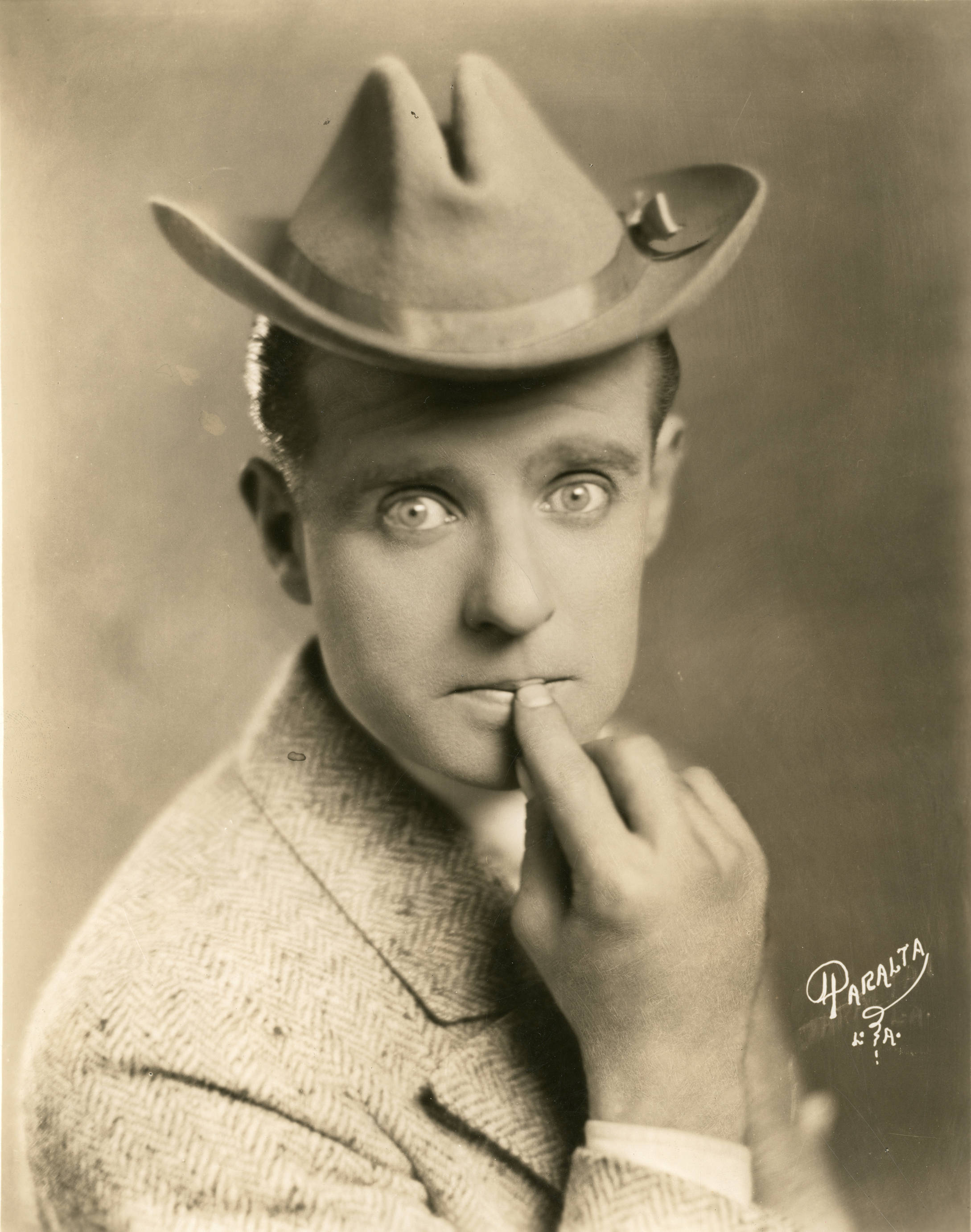
Morgan in 1928

Gene Morgan (born Eugene Kenney; March 12, 1893 – August 13, 1940) was an American actor. He appeared in 111 films between 1926 and 1941.

== Background ==
Morgan was born Eugene Kenney in Racine, Wisconsin. In his early roles he was cast in westerns.

Before Morgan performed in films he worked as a master of ceremonies for stage shows. A newspaper review of his performance in a Fanchon and Marco production in San Bernardino in 1925 said Morgan "keeps the audiences in a continuous uproar of laughter with his brilliant humor and funny antics interspersed with a series of soft shoe dances that bring down the house with applause". By 1928 he was regarded as "Fanchon and Marco's 'ace'" when he made his first appearance at Grauman's Egyptian Theatre.

Morgan's film career began in Hal Roach and Pathe comedies. In 1938, he appeared in Mr. Smith Goes to Washington in an uncredited role. That year, he was signed by Republic Pictures.

== Personal life and death ==
Morgan's wife was named Rachael. On August 13, 1940, Morgan died in Santa Monica, California suddenly of a heart attack. (A contemporary newspaper account says that he died on August 15, 1940.)

== Selected filmography ==
- Rogue of the Rio Grande (1930) - Mayor Seth Landport
- Anybody's Blonde (1931)
- Blonde Venus (1932)
- False Faces (1932)
- Hook and Ladder (1932 short)
- Song of the Eagle (1933)
- Super Speed (1935)
- Men of the Hour (1935)
- Panic on the Air (1936)
- Alibi for Murder (1936)
- End of the Trail (1936)
- Come Closer, Folks (1936)
- The Music Goes 'Round (1936)
- Counterfeit (1936)
- Counterfeit Lady (1936)
- Devil's Squadron (1936)
- Shakedown (1936)
- Make Way for Tomorrow (1937)
- Murder in Greenwich Village (1937)
- Speed to Spare (1937)
- Woman in Distress (1937)
- All American Sweetheart (1937)
- Federal Man-Hunt (1938)
- Extortion (1938)
- The Main Event (1938)
- Mr. Smith Goes to Washington (1939, uncredited)
- Saps at Sea (1940)
- Meet John Doe (1941, uncredited)
