= The Sideshow (film) =

1928 film by Erle C. Kenton

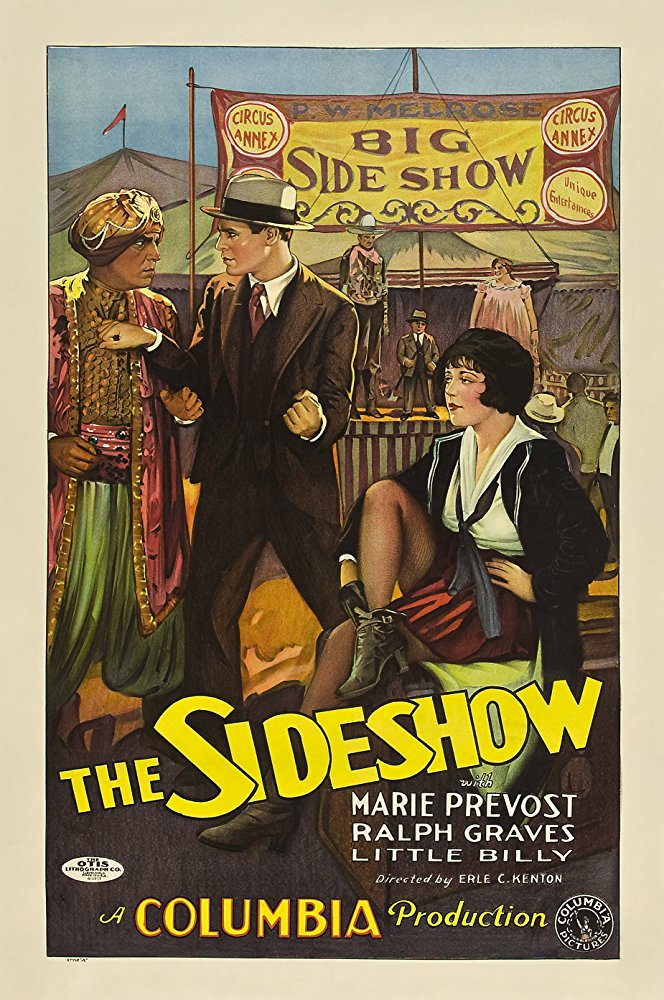
- Film poster
- Directed by: Erle C. Kenton
- Written by: Howard J. Green
- Produced by: Jack Cohn
- Starring: Marie Prevost; Ralph Graves; Alan Roscoe
- Cinematography: Joseph Walker
- Production company: Columbia Pictures
- Distributed by: Columbia Pictures
- Release date: December 11, 1928
- Running time: 70 minutes
- Country: United States
- Language: Silent (English intertitles)

The Sideshow is a 1928 American silent drama film directed by Erle C. Kenton and starring Marie Prevost, Ralph Graves, and Alan Roscoe.

== Plot ==
A circus is threatened by acts of sabotage organized by a rival company.

== Cast ==
- Marie Prevost as Queenie Parker
- Ralph Graves as Gentleman Ted Rogers
- 'Little Billy' Rhodes as P.W. Melrose
- Alan Roscoe as Ghandi
- Pat Harmon as Bowen - the Canvas Boss
- R.E. 'Tex' Madsen as Tall Man
- Martha McGruger as Fat Lady
- Steve Clemente as Knife Thrower
- Janet Ford as Knife Thrower's Aide
- Paul Desmuke as Armless Man
- Bert Price as Tattooed Man
- Chester Morton as Thin Man
- Jacques Ray as Fire Eater

== Preservation status ==
Prints of The Sideshow exist at the French archive Centre national du cinéma et de l'image animée in Fort de Bois-d'Arcy and the UCLA Film & Television Archive.

== Bibliography ==
- Munden, Kenneth White. The American Film Institute Catalog of Motion Pictures Produced in the United States, Part 1. University of California Press, 1997.
