= Flight (1929 film) =

1929 film

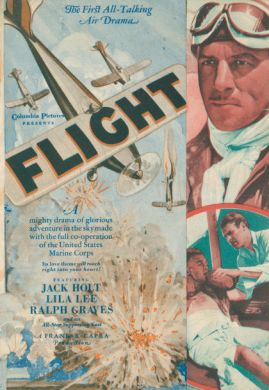
- Directed by: Frank Capra
- Written by: Ralph Graves (story); Frank Capra (dialogue); Howard J. Green (uncredited)
- Produced by: Harry Cohn; Frank Capra
- Starring: Jack Holt; Ralph Graves; Lila Lee
- Cinematography: Joseph Walker; Paul Perry; Elmer Dyer (aerial)
- Edited by: Ben Pivar; Maurice Wright; Gene Milford
- Production company: Columbia Pictures
- Distributed by: Columbia Pictures (US); Woolf & Freedman Film Service (UK)
- Release date: September 13, 1929 (New York City)
- Running time: 110 minutes
- Country: United States
- Language: English

Flight is a 1929 American pre-Code adventure and aviation film directed by Frank Capra. The film stars Jack Holt, Lila Lee and Ralph Graves, who also came up with the story, for which Capra wrote the dialogue. (Note: The film's tagline was: "The first all-talking drama of the air will thrill you!") Dedicated to the United States Marine Corps, the production was greatly aided by their full cooperation.

== Plot ==
Flight (1929)

College football player Lefty Phelps causes his school to lose the big game when he gets disoriented after a tackle and runs the wrong way. After being treated decently by gruff U.S. Marine Corps Sergeant "Panama" Williams, a spectator, Phelps decides to enlist in the Marines himself. He is selected to attend pilot training school at Naval Air Station Pensacola, where Williams is a flying instructor. When Williams finally recognizes Lefty, he befriends him and takes him under his wing.

On his first attempt at solo flight, however, Lefty is taunted about the football game by fellow recruit Steve Roberts, and cannot take off, resulting in a crash. Panama rescues Lefty from the burning aircraft, suffering burns to his hands. Lefty is "washed out" by his squadron commander, Major Rowell.

Lefty is taken to the base hospital, where he falls for Navy nurse Elinor Murray. When the "Flying Devils" squadron is sent to quell bandit attacks by the notorious General Lobo in Nicaragua, Panama arranges for Lefty to accompany him as his mechanic. Panama shows Lefty a photograph of Elinor, the love of his life, not knowing Lefty is in love with her too. When Elinor is sent to Nicaragua, she does not understand the guilt-stricken Lefty's cool reception. When the girl-shy Panama asks Lefty to propose to Elinor on his behalf, Elinor confesses her love for him instead, after which Panama accuses Lefty of betrayal.

An urgent call for help by a Marine outpost under bandit attack stops any confrontation. Lefty flies as gunner for Steve Roberts, who makes fun of him about shooting in the right direction. During the mission, their aircraft is shot down in a swamp. Unwilling to join in the rescue, Panama reports in sick, but once Elinor convinces him that Lefty never betrayed him, he flies his own solo rescue mission. At the crash site, Roberts dies of his injuries and is cremated by Lefty using their aircraft as a funeral pyre. Panama finds Lefty but is wounded by bandits led by General Lobo, after his landing. Lefty kills the attacking bandits, takes off, and brings the pair back, putting on an impressive flying display over the base that includes safely landing the aircraft after it loses a wheel. Sometime later, Lefty has won his wings and is now an instructor at the school, married to Elinor. When his wife arrives in their new car, Lefty accidentally pulls away in reverse.

== Cast ==
- Jack Holt as Gunnery Sergeant "Panama" Williams
- Lila Lee as Elinor Murray
- Ralph Graves as Corporal "Lefty" Phelps
- Eddy Chandler* as Marine Sergeant, Panama's buddy
- Edgar Dearing* as Football Coach
- Jimmy De La Cruze* as "Lobo" Sandino, the bandit leader
- Harold Goodwin* as Corporal Steve Roberts
- George Irving* as Marine Colonel in Nicaragua
- Alan Roscoe* as Major James D. Rowell

* uncredited

== Production ==
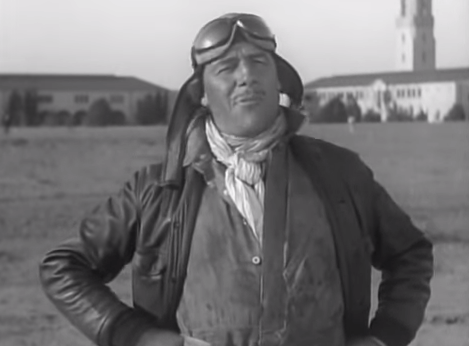
Film reviewer Hal Erickson found it ironic that Jack Holt, who in real life had a fear of flying, starred in so many aviation-oriented films.

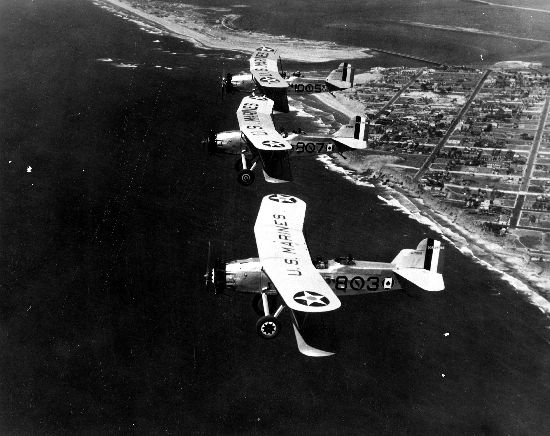
Curtiss OC-2s in flight, c. 1929

At the time of production, Jack Holt's career with Columbia Pictures was as a leading man. Capra specifically asked for him to star as the laconic pilot and with the acquiescence of studio head Harry Cohn, his role in Flight was emblematic of the studio's reliance on the popular and profitable action film. (Note: After a famous feud with studio head, Harry Cohn, Holt's career with Columbia Pictures took a dramatic downturn, as he was reduced to taking secondary roles.)

Receiving full cooperation from the Marine Corps, including the use of facilities and personnel at Naval Base San Diego and NAS North Island, provided the authentic settings Capra required. (Note: Capra readily used the machine gun in a fighter-bomber, along with "trippable" bombs that were offered to the production.) The initial flying sequence depicts the landing and taxi of an FB-1 fighter, with Holt stepping from the cockpit. { The flight training sequences were staged using Consolidated NY-1B trainers based at San Diego. Nine Marine Corps Curtiss OC-2 aircraft from Marine Attack Squadron 231 (VMA-231) were featured in the aerial combat sequences. The squadron, along with VO-10M (Marine Observation Squadron 10), also prominently appeared in Devil Dogs of the Air (1935).

A total of 28 aircraft were at Capra's disposal and with the benefit of using actual aircraft, Capra did not have to rely on "process shots" or special effects which was the standard of the day, although dangerous crash scenes and a mass night takeoff were staged using studio miniatures. Along with principal aerial photographer, Elmer Dyer, who filmed from a camera-equipped aircraft, Capra flew alongside in a director's aircraft to coordinate the aerial scenes. Jack Holt who was an accomplished pilot, flew in the film but crashed during one scene. Capra pushed for aerial close-ups and in one scene, wanted Holt to stand up in the cockpit but his parachute had deployed, and he remained seated, causing the scene to be abandoned. (Note: On landing, Capra had stormed over to Holt, but realized that the actor would have been in peril if he had followed the direction to stand up.) Noted Marine Corps exhibition pilots Lts. Bill Williams and Jerry Jerome were also involved in the production.

=== Historical accuracy ===
Capra also shot on location in La Mesa and Fallbrook, California, used for the Nicaragua scenes. Although a fictional treatment, the military action depicted in Nicaragua was based on the Battle of Ocotal on July 16, 1927, when the Marines battled hundreds of Sandinista rebels. Importing fire ants for the swamp scene became controversial as the ants were capable of biting through the actors' clothing. (Note: Holt had asked the prop manager to test the ants' ability to bite and witnessed the alarm when the ants attacked the man. Capra revised the scene accordingly.)

The opening scene where the football star takes off in the wrong direction was based on Capra's recalling a notable incident he witnessed, along with Columbia studio boss Harry Cohn, during the 1929 Rose Bowl when Roy Riegels was tackled by his own team after picking up a fumble and running toward his own goal line. Footage from the actual game is used. (Note: The 1929 Rose Bowl is coincidentally notable for having a publicity overflight and aerial refueling demonstration by the experimental Air Corps aircraft nicknamed "?" on the first day of its week-long non-stop flight.)

== Reception ==
Flight garnered a lukewarm response from critics and did well at the box office. Typical of the reviews was the one appearing in The New York Times: "During those all too brief moments when the producer skips away from melodramatic flubdub, tedious romantic passages and slapstick comedy and turns to scenes of airplanes in formation and flying stunts, 'Flight,' a talking film presented last night by Columbia Pictures Corporation at the George M. Cohan and dedicated to the United States Marines, is well worth watching." In a later day review, Alun Evans lumped the film in with similar propaganda films of the silent era that depicted US involvement in Mexican and Latin American conflicts.

Largely forgotten today, Flight is representative of Capra's early period and fits in well with the silent Submarine (1928) and later Dirigible (1931) as a trio of military-themed productions. Now available in home video, the film is rarely broadcast as it is considered a minor work in the Capra filmology.

== See also ==
- List of early sound feature films (1926–1929)
