= The Foolish Matrons =

1921 film by Maurice Tourneur

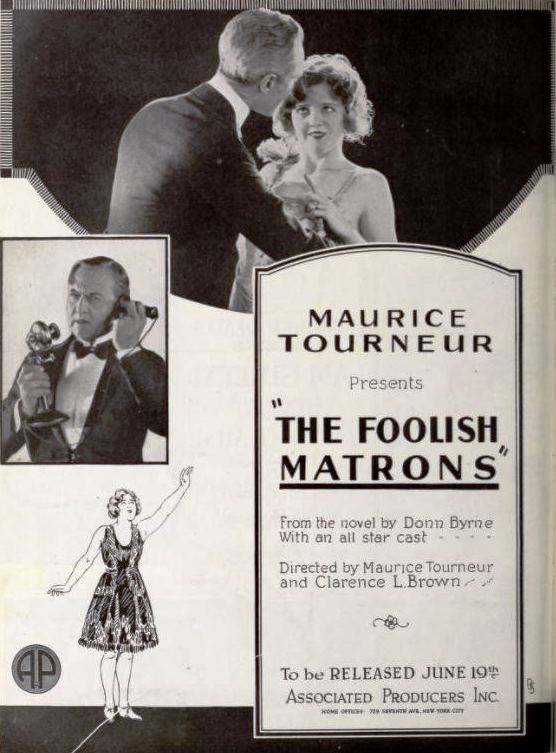
- Advertisement
- Directed by: Maurice Tourneur
- Written by: Wyndham Gittens
- Based on: The Foolish Matrons by Brian Oswald Donn-Byrne
- Produced by: Maurice Tourneur
- Starring: Hobart Bosworth; Doris May; Mildred Manning
- Cinematography: Kenneth Gordon MacLean; Charles Van Enger
- Production company: Maurice Tourneur Productions
- Distributed by: Associated Producers
- Release date: June 19, 1921 (USA)
- Running time: 7 reels
- Country: United States
- Language: Silent (English intertitles)

The Foolish Matrons is a 1921 American silent drama film directed by Clarence Brown and Maurice Tourneur and starring Hobart Bosworth, Doris May, and Mildred Manning. It is also known by the alternative title of Is Marriage a Failure?. It is preserved in the George Eastman House collection.

== Cast ==
- Hobart Bosworth as Dr. Ian Fraser
- Doris May as Georgia Wayne
- Mildred Manning as Sheila Hopkins
- Kathleen Kirkham as Annis Grand
- Betty Schade as The Mysterious Woman
- Margaret McWade as Mrs. Eugenia Sheridan
- Charles Meredith as Lafayette Wayne
- Wallace MacDonald as Anthony Sheridan
- Michael Dark as Chester King
- Frankie Lee as Bobby
- Dick Sutherland as Bit Role

== Bibliography ==
- Waldman, Harry. Maurice Tourneur: The Life and Films. McFarland, 2001.
