= Ladies of the Evening =

Ladies of the Evening is a play in four acts by Milton Herbert Gropper. It premiered on Broadway at the Lyceum Theatre on December 23, 1924. It closed in May 1925 after 159 performances. The production was produced and directed by David Belasco. It starred James Kirkwood as the painter Jerry Strong, Beth Merrill as Kay Beatty, Edna Hibbard as Dot Miller, H. Dudley Hawley as Calvin King, Kay Strozzi as Claire Standish, Vernon Steele as Tom Standish, and Robert O'Connor as Frank Forbes. The play was adapted into the 1930 film Ladies of Leisure starring Barbara Stanwyck.
