= The Marriage Speculation =

1917 film by Ashley Miller

- Advertizement
- Directed by: Ashley Miller
- Screenplay by: A. Van Buren Powell
- Story by: Cyrus Townsend Brady; Albert E. Smith
- Starring: Charles Kent; Mildred Manning; Wallace MacDonald
- Production company: Vitagraph Company of America
- Distributed by: V-L-S-E
- Release date: December 10, 1917
- Running time: 5 reels
- Country: United States
- Language: Silent (English intertitles)

The Marriage Speculation is a 1917 comedy-drama film directed by Ashley Miller.

== Plot ==
Mr. Cliday is an old man who has saved $10,000 after 20 years of employment at a pickle factory. He decides to invest the money in young Clara Wilson's education if she agrees to marry a rich man who will ensure that Mr. Cliday has enough money to support himself for the rest of his life. However, this means that Clara Wilson has to leave her current lover, Billie Perkins. Clara does not like any of the men who Cliday wants her to marry, but she nonetheless agrees to marry an Italian count. By the time of the wedding, Billy is able to pay Mr. Cliday the money needed to insure his retirement. At the wedding, Billy wears a disguise to look like the count. Clara doesn't realize this until well into the ceremony. Mr. Cliday also relieves her of her obligation to marry a rich man, and the film ends.

== Cast ==
- Charles Kent as Mr. Cliday
- Mildred Manning as Clara Wilson
- Wallace MacDonald as Billie Perkins
