= Dirigible (film) =

1931 film

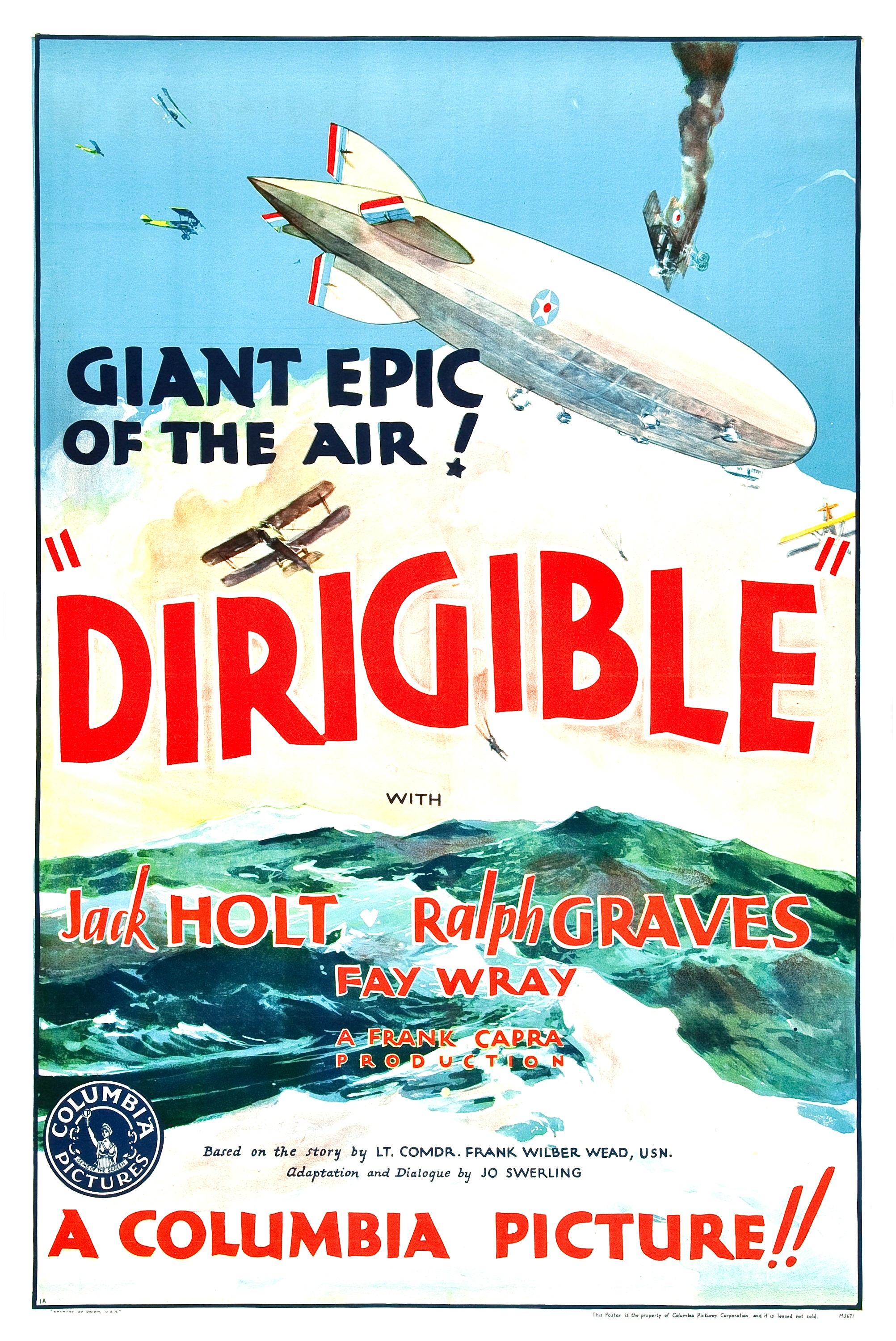
- Theatrical release poster
- Directed by: Frank Capra
- Written by: Frank Wead (story); Dorothy Howell; Jo Swerling (continuity)
- Produced by: Harry Cohn; Frank Fouce
- Starring: Jack Holt; Ralph Graves; Fay Wray; Hobart Bosworth
- Cinematography: Joseph Walker
- Edited by: Maurice Wright
- Distributed by: Columbia Pictures
- Release date: April 4, 1931
- Running time: 100 minutes
- Country: United States
- Language: English
- Budget: $650,000

Dirigible is a 1931 American pre-Code adventure film directed by Frank Capra for Columbia Pictures and starring Jack Holt, Ralph Graves and Fay Wray. The picture focuses on the competition between naval fixed-wing and airship pilots to reach the South Pole by air.

The female lead is played by Fay Wray. The action scenes feature the stars Jack Holt and Ralph Graves, who also played fliers two years earlier in Capra's 1929 airborne adventure Flight. This film had been intended to emulate the success of Wings (1927), another production with a similar plot. Dirigible was characterized as "marginally science fictional" by scifilm.org. (Capra later planned to make a fully science fictional movie but was never able to.)

== Plot ==
When the famed explorer Louis Rondelle requests the U.S. Navy's assistance in reaching the South Pole, officer Jack Bradon convinces Rear Admiral John S. Martin to offer his dirigible, the USS Pensacola, for the attempt.

Jack asks his best friend, "Frisky" Pierce, to pilot the biplane that will be carried on the airship. Frisky, who is adventurous to the point of recklessness, is eager to go even though he has just completed a record-setting coast-to-coast flight and has barely spent any time with his wife, Helen. Basking in the acclaim, he has even forgotten to read the sealed love letter she gave him to open when he arrived.

Helen loves Frisky but cannot make him believe how much she is hurt by the risks he takes. She sees Jack without her husband's knowledge and begs him to drop Frisky from the expedition, and for the sake of their marriage, not tell him why. Jack, who also loves her, agrees. Frisky, assuming Jack does not want to share the fame, ends their friendship.

The expedition soon ends in disaster: the Pensacola breaks in two and crashes into the ocean during a storm. Frisky participates in the rescue of the expedition by aircraft carrier. He now gets a leave of absence from the Navy to pilot a Fokker Trimotor transport aircraft for Rondelle's next attempt at the South Pole. This proves too much for Helen. When she is unable to get Frisky to change his mind, she gives him another sealed letter (to be read when he reaches the Pole), but this time it says that she is divorcing him and will ask Jack to marry her.

Frisky, Rondelle, Sock McGuire, and Hansen reach the South Pole. When Frisky suggests landing on the snow, Rondelle accepts his judgment that there will be no danger. But in fact the aircraft flips over and bursts into flames, destroying most of their supplies. Rondelle's leg is broken and Sock's foot is injured.

After radioing their base camp, they attempt to walk the 900 miles back to it, dragging Rondelle on a sled. Rondelle soon dies and is buried. Later, Frisky has to amputate Sock's foot. When Sock realizes he is too much of a burden, he drags himself away to die while the other two are sleeping. They carry on, but Hansen breaks down when he finds they have been going in a circle and have returned to Rondelle's grave. Frisky refuses to give up and forces Hansen to continue on.

When Helen hears the news of the crash, she realizes she no longer wants a divorce and wishes she could go to Frisky. Jack realizes he can, and talks Rear Admiral Martin into letting him attempt a rescue with his new dirigible, the USS Los Angeles. The two survivors are found and rescued. On the way back, Frisky remembers that he has again forgotten to read Helen's letter, but he has snow blindness and asks Jack to read it to him. Jack quickly substitutes his own improvised version, in which Helen is proud of his accomplishment and waiting for her husband with undiminished love. He then destroys the letter. When they return, Frisky uncharacteristically skips a ticker tape parade through New York City to be with his wife. He is the first to mention the contents of the letter; to Helen's great relief, she realizes that Jack has not only brought Frisky back to her but also saved their marriage.

== Cast ==
Main roles and screen credits, as appearing in the film:

- Jack Holt as Jack Bradon
- Ralph Graves as "Frisky" Pierce
- Fay Wray as Helen Pierce
- Hobart Bosworth as Louis Rondelle
- Roscoe Karns as Sock McGuire
- Harold Goodwin as Hansen
- Clarence Muse as Clarence
- Emmett Corrigan as Rear Admiral John S. Martin
- Adrian Morris as Crewman

== Production ==
Capra and Columbia considered Dirigible as a step forward into the big time, with a $650,000 budget, the highest amount the studio had ever invested. Shot at Lakehurst, New Jersey, at the hangar that would house the U.S. Navy and later the Graf Zeppelin and the Hindenburg. The Navy gave "its full resources at Lakehurst" including the pride of the fleet, the USS Los Angeles to lend an air of authenticity to the production. The Los Angeles was featured prominently and also portrayed the fictional USS Pensacola. US Navy Lieutenant Commander Frank "Spig" Wead, a former pilot and graduate of Pensacola NAS Flight School, was given the story credit and stayed on as a technical consultant.

As production began, the old Ross Airfield in Arcadia, California, which was turned into a movie lot during a heatwave in 1930, was converted into the Antarctic film set, complete with "artificial snow, fake ice mounds and painted backdrop attached to the back side of the dilapidated Army barracks." With principal photography slated for September, dry ice in metal containers stuffed in actor's mouths sufficed for the usual Arctic breath. In a 1972 interview director Frank Capra, on TV's "Dick Cavett Show", Capra recalled a horrible accident on set. Capra asked actors to use dry ice encased in small cages in the mouth, to simulate foggy breath in the scene. Because the small cages were cumbersome in the mouth, a frustrated Hobart Bosworth removed the ice and popped it directly into his mouth for the scene. Soon, Bosworth was rushed to hospital with ice burns in his mouth, resulting in removal of some teeth, jaw bone, and tissue.

=== Aviation aspects ===
This film is historically important to aviation buffs. A mid-air docking and recovery of a fighter aircraft with a dirigible is shown. The crash of an airship during a storm is accurately depicted. The aircraft carrier USS Lexington, with her 8-inch guns, can be spotted in the background during the takeoff of an aircraft. After being sunk at sea in 1942, she was replaced with the Essex-class Lexington (CVS-16) and would later call Pensacola Naval Air Station her home port in 1962, replacing the previous USS Antietam as the resident flight school student pilot trainer craft, before being decommissioned in 1991 and retired as one of several floating museum ships, in the harbor of Corpus Christi, Texas.

The aerial cinematography was coordinated by Elmer Dyer.

== Reception ==
Dirigible was Capra's and Columbia's first film to be given prominence with a premiere at Grauman's Chinese Theatre, but despite high hopes, the film received lukewarm reviews. Variety called it "unconvincing." A more recent review noted its "odd mix of romantic cliches, nascent disaster elements, and adventurism .... It works, partly because Capra intermingles so much documentary-styled footage of the airship and Antarctic expedition."

== See also ==
- With Byrd at the South Pole (1929)
- The Lost Zeppelin (1929)
