= Ladies of Leisure =

1930 film

- Original newspaper advertisement
- Directed by: Frank Capra
- Screenplay by: Jo Swerling
- Based on: Ladies of the Evening; 1924 play by Milton Herbert Gropper
- Produced by: Frank Capra (uncredited); Harry Cohn
- Starring: Barbara Stanwyck; Ralph Graves; Lowell Sherman
- Cinematography: Joseph Walker
- Edited by: Maurice Wright
- Music by: Mischa Bakaleinikoff
- Production company: Columbia Pictures
- Distributed by: Columbia Pictures
- Release date: April 5, 1930
- Running time: 99 minutes
- Country: United States
- Language: English

Ladies of Leisure is a 1930 American pre-Code romantic drama film directed by Frank Capra and starring Barbara Stanwyck, Ralph Graves, and Lowell Sherman. The screenplay by Jo Swerling is based on the 1924 play Ladies of the Evening by Milton Herbert Gropper, which ran for 159 performances on Broadway.

The film is about an artist from a wealthy family who hires a "party girl" as his model. As they get to know each other, the girl begins to regret her past, and the two fall in love, but they must face his family's strong opposition to their union. Ladies of Leisure received generally positive reviews, and Stanwyck's performance was praised by critics. The success of the film made Stanwyck a star.

== Plot ==
Ladies of Leisure (1930)

Aspiring artist, Jerry Strong, the son of a wealthy railroad tycoon, sneaks out of a party he allowed his friend Bill Standish to hold at his New York City penthouse apartment and studio. While out driving in the country, Jerry meets self-described "party girl" Kay Arnold, who is escaping from another party aboard a yacht, and gives her a ride back to the city. He sees something in her and offers her a job as his model for a painting titled "Hope". In their first session, Jerry wipes off her makeup to try to bring out her true nature. Perpetual partier and drunkard Standish thinks Kay looks fine just the way she is and invites her on a cruise to Havana. She declines his offer.

As they get to know each other better, Kay falls in love with Jerry and comes to rue her tawdry past. This is reflected in her face, and she finally achieves a pose Jerry finds inspiring. He paints so late into the night that he offers to let her sleep on his couch.

The next morning, Jerry's father John shows up and demands he dismiss Kay and marry his longtime fiancée Claire Collins. John found out all about Kay's checkered background and she does not deny the facts. When Jerry refuses, John cuts off all relations with his stubborn son. Kay decides to quit anyway for Jerry's benefit. This forces him to declare he loves her. She suggests running off to Arizona.

Jerry's mother comes to see Kay. Though Kay convinces her that she genuinely loves Jerry, Mrs. Strong still begs her to give him up for his own good. Kay tearfully agrees and makes plans to go to Havana with Bill Standish. Her roommate and good friend, Dot Lamar, races to tell Jerry, but by the time she reaches him, the ship has sailed. Despondent, Kay tries to commit suicide by leaping into the water. When she awakens in the hospital, Jerry is waiting at her bedside.

== Cast ==
- Barbara Stanwyck as Kay Arnold
- Lowell Sherman as Bill Standish
- Ralph Graves as Jerry Strong
- Marie Prevost as Dot Lamar
- Nance O'Neil as Mrs. Strong
- George Fawcett as John Strong
- Juliette Compton as Claire Collins
- Johnnie Walker as Charlie

== Production ==
Ladies of Leisure, which began with the working title of "Ladies of the Evening", was Frank Capra's fifth sound film, and the first project over which Columbia Pictures head Harry Cohn gave him complete creative control. Cohn assigned the director to adapt Ladies of the Evening, a melodrama David Belasco had produced on Broadway in late 1924, and after Capra completed a first draft screenplay he invited Jo Swerling – a playwright from New York who had been brought to Hollywood by Cohn – to work on the script.

Swerling initially declined because he thought it was a "putrid piece of gorgonzola", "inane, vacuous, pompous, unreal, unbelievable – and incredibly dull", but decided to work on it nonetheless. "I went to my hotel, locked myself in my room and for five days pounded out a rewrite story of the plot I'd heard, interrupting the writing only long enough for black coffee, sandwiches and brief snatches of sleep", the screenwriter later recalled. "I was simply writing a newspaper yarn with a longer deadline than usual."

Despite the fact her three previous films had been critical and commercial failures, Cohn was intent on casting Stanwyck as Kay, but the actress was on the verge of returning to her theatrical roots in New York City. She agreed to meet with Capra, who had another actress in mind, but the interview went badly. Stanwyck's husband, actor Frank Fay, became furious when Stanwyck returned home crying and called Capra to complain. The director was surprised by her reaction, saying she had acted as if she did not want the part. Fay urged him to screen a film test she had made for The Noose at Warner Bros., and Capra was so impressed by it he urged Cohn to sign her immediately.

When filming began, Capra quickly learned Stanwyck was unlike any actress he previously had directed. In his autobiography The Name Above the Title, he recalled:

I discovered a vital technical lack – one that shook us all up: Stanwyck gave her all the first time she tried a scene ... All subsequent repetitions, in rehearsals or retakes, were pale copies of her original performance. This was a new phenomenon – and a new challenge, not only to me, but to the actors and the crews. I had to rehearse the cast without her. The actors grumbled. Not fair to them, they said. Who ever heard of an actress not rehearsing? ... On the set I never let Stanwyck utter one word of the scene until the cameras were rolling. Before that I talked to her in her dressing room, told her the meaning of the scene, the points of emphasis, the pauses ... I talked softly, not wanting to fan the smoldering fires that lurked beneath that somber silence. She remembered every word I said – and she never blew a line.

Capra previously had worked with cinematographer Joseph Walker on four silent films. The director was impressed not only with Walker's artistic vision, but his various camera-related inventions as well. He not only ground his own lenses, but he used a different one for each of the actresses he photographed. Many of the elements typical of Capra films – the backlighting of actresses, the transformation of minimal sets into dreamlike images, the delicate night scenes and erotic rain scenes – were suggested to Capra by Walker. The two collaborated on twenty projects between 1928 and 1946.

Ladies of Leisure was filmed from December 1929 to January 1930, at Columbia's studios and on location at Malibu Lake. The film should not be confused with Columbia's 1926 silent film of the same name, directed by Tom Buckingham and starring Elaine Hammerstein; however Capra's film was also released in a silent version for theaters not equipped for sound. Both of Capra's silent and sound versions are held by the Library of Congress. The film was remade in 1937 by Columbia as Women of Glamour, starring Virginia Bruce and directed by Gordon Wiles.

== Critical reception ==
Following the film's premiere on April 5, 1930, Photoplay magazine reported that halfway through the showing, the audience "choked up" and that "something was happening ... a real, beautiful, thrilling wonder had been born." The Photoplay article continued:

It was Barbara Stanwyck, whose performance in Ladies of Leisure is one of the greatest yet given in the adolescent talkies. It is truly thrilling. A star's been born, and we are proud to cry her welcome ... this beautiful young girl who possesses emotional power and acting talent that are really amazing.

In his review for The New York Times, Mordaunt Hall praised the film for "its amusing dialogue, the restrained performances of nearly all the players and a general lightness of handling that commends the direction of Frank Capra." Hall concluded, "The picture is sufficiently variegated in drama and more amusing moments to be attractive film fare."

The review in Variety was less positive, noting that Stanwyck "delivers the only really sympathetic wallop of the footage" and "saves the particular picture with her ability to convince in heavy emotional scenes." TV Guide later rated the film 2½ out of four stars and noted, "Capra kept everyone under tight rein and any tendency to emote was admirably stifled under his firm direction."

=== Censorship ===
When Ladies of Leisure was released, many states and cities in the United States had censor boards that could require cuts or other eliminations before the film could be shown. While the Chicago Board of Censors may not have required any cuts, because of its content the film was passed with a pink ticket, or "adults only", for showing at the Woods Theatre.

== Awards and honors ==
When the film was released, Capra was convinced that it would garner Academy Award nominations for himself and Stanwyck, and possibly even for best film. When it failed to get a single nomination, both he and Columbia studio head Harry Cohn were outraged and sent angry letters to the Academy of Motion Picture Arts and Sciences. As a result, Capra became a member of the academy, but wanting more, campaigned to be one of the institution's board of governors, and was elected to a three-year term.
