= Wallace MacDonald =

Canadian actor (1891–1978)

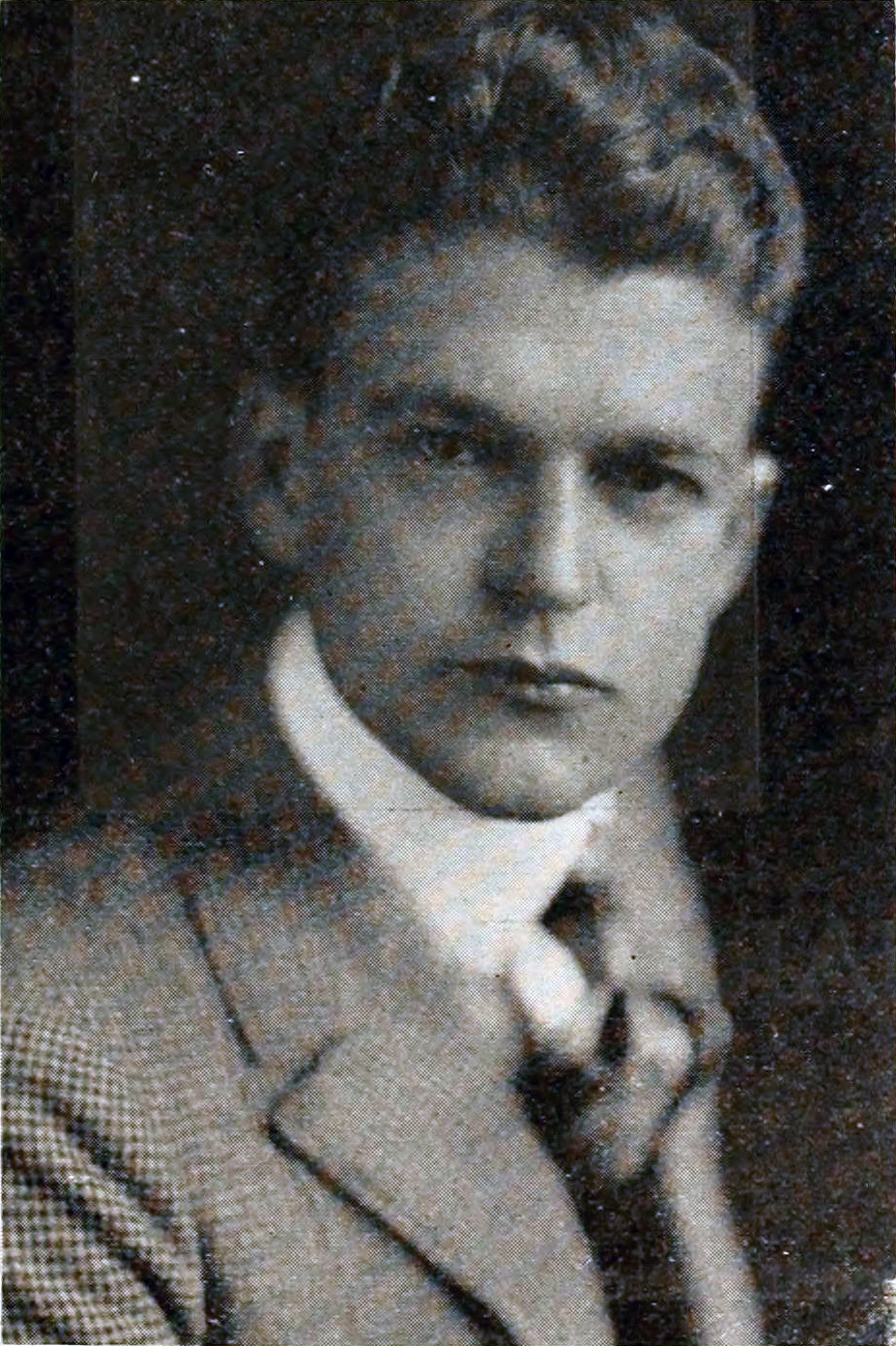
- The Moving Picture World, 1916
- Born: 5 May 1891; Mulgrave, Nova Scotia, Canada
- Died: 30 October 1978 (aged 87); Santa Barbara, California, U.S.
- Occupations: Actor; Film producer
- Years active: 1912–1959
- Spouse: Doris May (1921-1978, his death)

Wallace Archibald MacDonald (5 May 1891 – 30 October 1978) was a Canadian silent film actor and film producer.

== Biography ==
MacDonald was born in Mulgrave, Nova Scotia, Canada, and attended school in Sydney, Nova Scotia.

He started as a messenger boy with the Dominion Steel Company in Sydney, Nova Scotia. He later worked up to teller with the Royal Bank branch in Sydney before the bank transferred him to Vancouver, British Columbia. His first venture into acting came with a stock theater company in Vancouver. From there, he moved to California, where he acted on the stage before making inroads into Hollywood. He gained other acting experience with stock companies in Texas and Arizona.

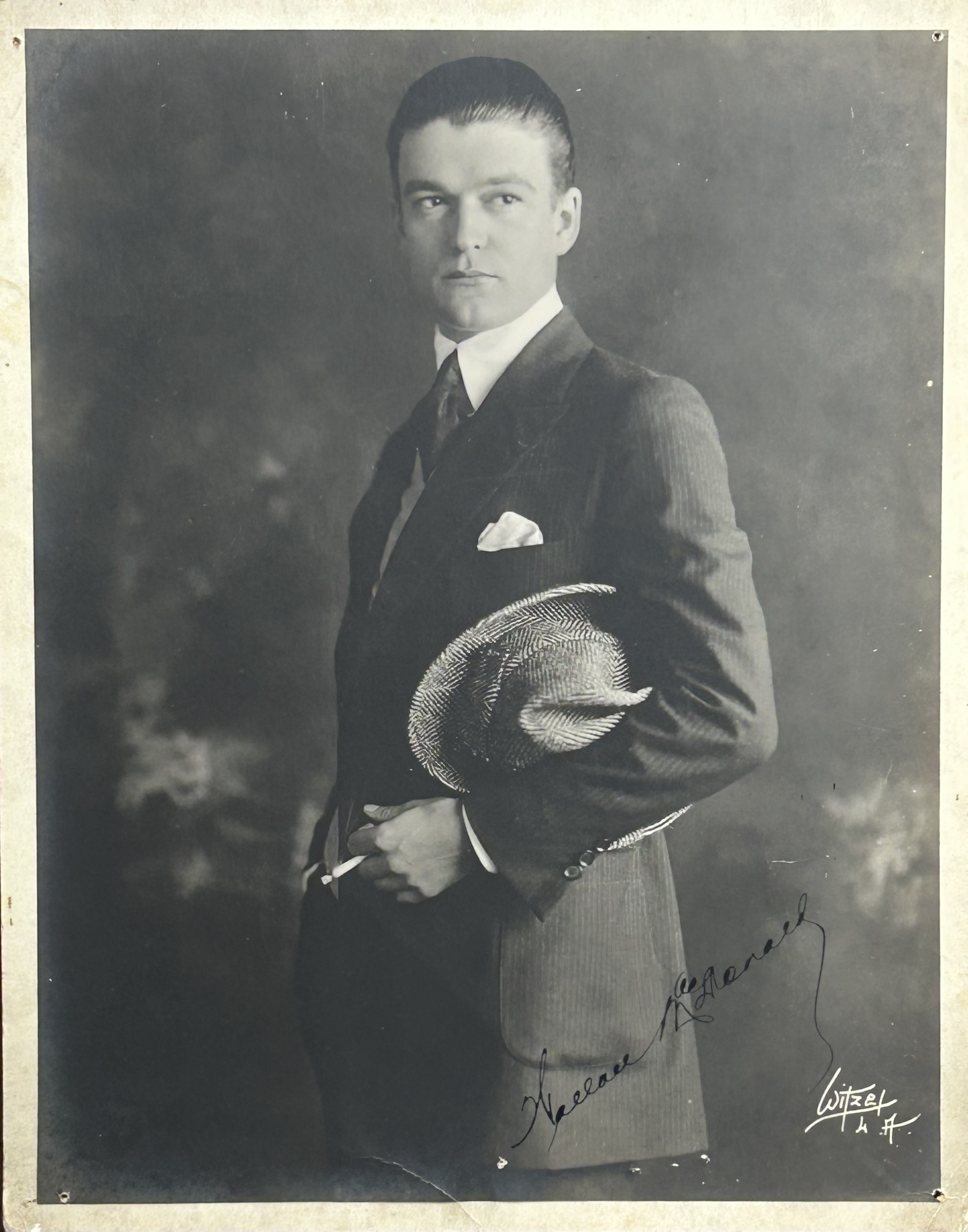
Signed Portrait

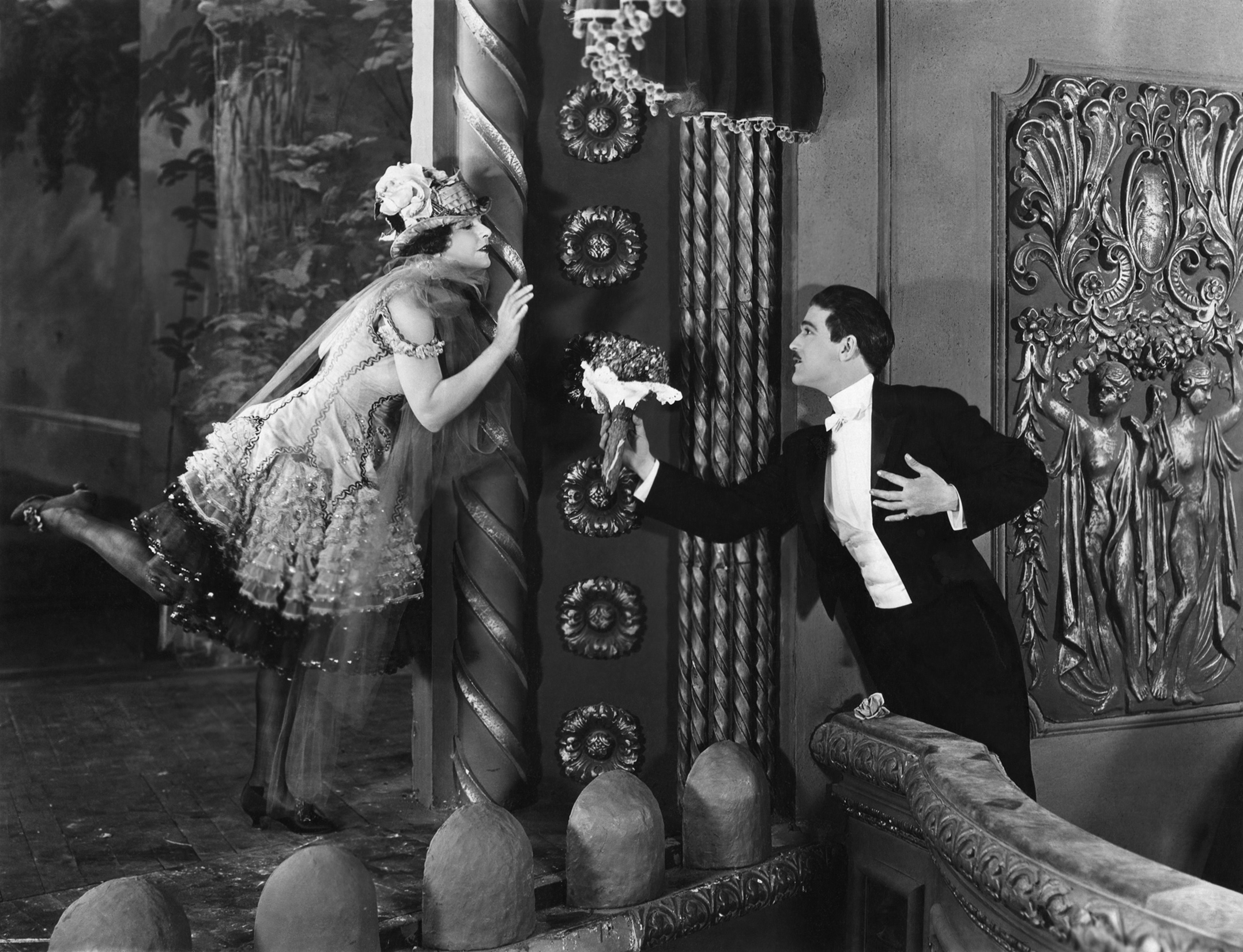
MacDonald handing Norma Talmadge a bouquet in The Lady, 1925

MacDonald owned a small theater in Los Angeles, doing most of the work there himself. When he tired of working 80 hours per week he approached a producer who was having difficulties, offering to show all of that studio's films in return for being allowed to act in them. The producer agreed. He started as an actor in films in 1914 and starred in almost 120 motion pictures between then and 1932. He had notable roles in such films as Youth's Endearing Charm in 1916 working with Mary Miles Minter and Harry von Meter.

Late in World War I, he returned briefly to Nova Scotia to enlist in the 10th Canadian Siege Battery where he assisted in recruiting for the Canadian Army. With the advent of sound, MacDonald's acting career diminished, and most of his roles between 1927 and 1932 went uncredited. He began directing in 1927 with the comedy Silly Sailor for Rox Films. He retired from acting in 1932 to concentrate on script writing. However, by 1937 he had recognized the potential of film production. It is in his role of producer that MacDonald is now probably best remembered. He produced well over 100 films between 1937 and 1959.

MacDonald married actress Doris May in Los Angeles on May 5, 1921, and they remained wed until his death. He died in 1978 in Santa Barbara, California.

MacDonald is sometimes mistaken as a brother of actor Francis McDonald. Though they bear a physical resemblance and were born in 1891, they were born three months apart and spelled their surnames differently.

== Selected filmography ==
=== As actor ===
- The Face on the Bar Room Floor (1914 short)
- The Rounders (1914)*short
- Dough and Dynamite (1914 short)
- Tillie's Punctured Romance (1914) as Keystone Cop (uncredited)
- Purity (1916)
- The Princess of Park Row (1917)
- The Marriage Speculation (1917)
- Madame Sphinx (1918)
- Spotlight Sadie (1919)
- Cupid Forecloses (1919)
- The Little Boss (1919)
- A Girl Named Mary (1919)
- Leave It to Susan (1919)
- Rouge and Riches (1920)
- Trumpet Island (1920)
- Moon Madness (1920)
- Cinderella's Twin (1920)
- Are All Men Alike? (1920)
- The Foolish Matrons (1921)
- The Fire Cat (1921)
- The Sage Hen (1921)
- Under Oath (1922)
- The Understudy (1922)
- Youth Must Have Love (1923)
- The Day of Faith (1923)
- Maytime (1923)
- Thy Name Is Woman (1924)
- Love and Glory (1924)
- Roaring Rails (1924)
- The Heart Bandit (1924)
- Curlytop (1924)
- The Sea Hawk (1924)
- The Lady (1925)
- The Charmer (1925)
- New Lives for Old (1925)
- Heir-Loons (1925)
- Pampered Youth (1925)
- The Primrose Path (1925)
- Lightnin' (1925)
- The Bar-C Mystery (1926)
- Two Can Play (1926)
- Hell's Four Hundred (1926)
- The Checkered Flag (1926)
- Fighting with Buffalo Bill (1926)
- Whispering Smith Rides (1927)
- Your Wife and Mine (1927)
- His Foreign Wife (1927)
- Blockade (1928)
- Tropical Nights (1928)
- Fancy Baggage (1929)
- Darkened Rooms (1929)
- Dark Skies (1929)
- Hit the Deck (1930)
- Madam Satan (1930)
- Fighting Thru (1930)
- The Drums of Jeopardy (1931)
- The Pagan Lady (1931)
- Branded (1931)
- The Range Feud (1931)
- High Speed (1932)
- The Riding Tornado (1932)
- The Arm of the Law (1932)
- Between Fighting Men (1932)
- Tex Takes a Holiday (1932)
- Daring Danger (1932)
- Two Latins from Manhattan (1941)

=== As writer ===
- The Wyoming Whirlwind (1932)
- Cornered (1932) (screenplay)
- The Phantom Empire (1935) (story)

=== As producer ===
- Counsel for Crime (1937)
- Murder in Greenwich Village (1937)
- Women in Prison (1938)
- Girls of the Road (1940)
- Glamour for Sale (1940)
- The Man with Nine Lives (1940) (uncredited)
- Before I Hang (1940) (uncredited)
- The Devil Commands (1941)
- Harvard, Here I Come! (1941)
- The Face Behind the Mask (1941)
- Counter-Espionage (1942)
- Tramp, Tramp, Tramp (1942)
- A Man's World (1942)
- Two Señoritas from Chicago (1943)
- Sailor's Holiday (1944)
- The Devil's Mask (1946)
- Rusty Leads the Way (1948)
- My Dog Rusty (1948)
- Rusty Saves a Life (1949)
- On the Isle of Samoa (1950)
- Corky of Gasoline Alley (1951)
- Man in the Dark (1953)
- The Nebraskan (1953)
- Return to Warbow (1958)
- Gunmen from Laredo (1959) - also directed

=== As director ===
- Girl from the West (1923)
- Free Lips (1928)
