= Ralph Graves =

American screenwriter and actor (1900–1977)

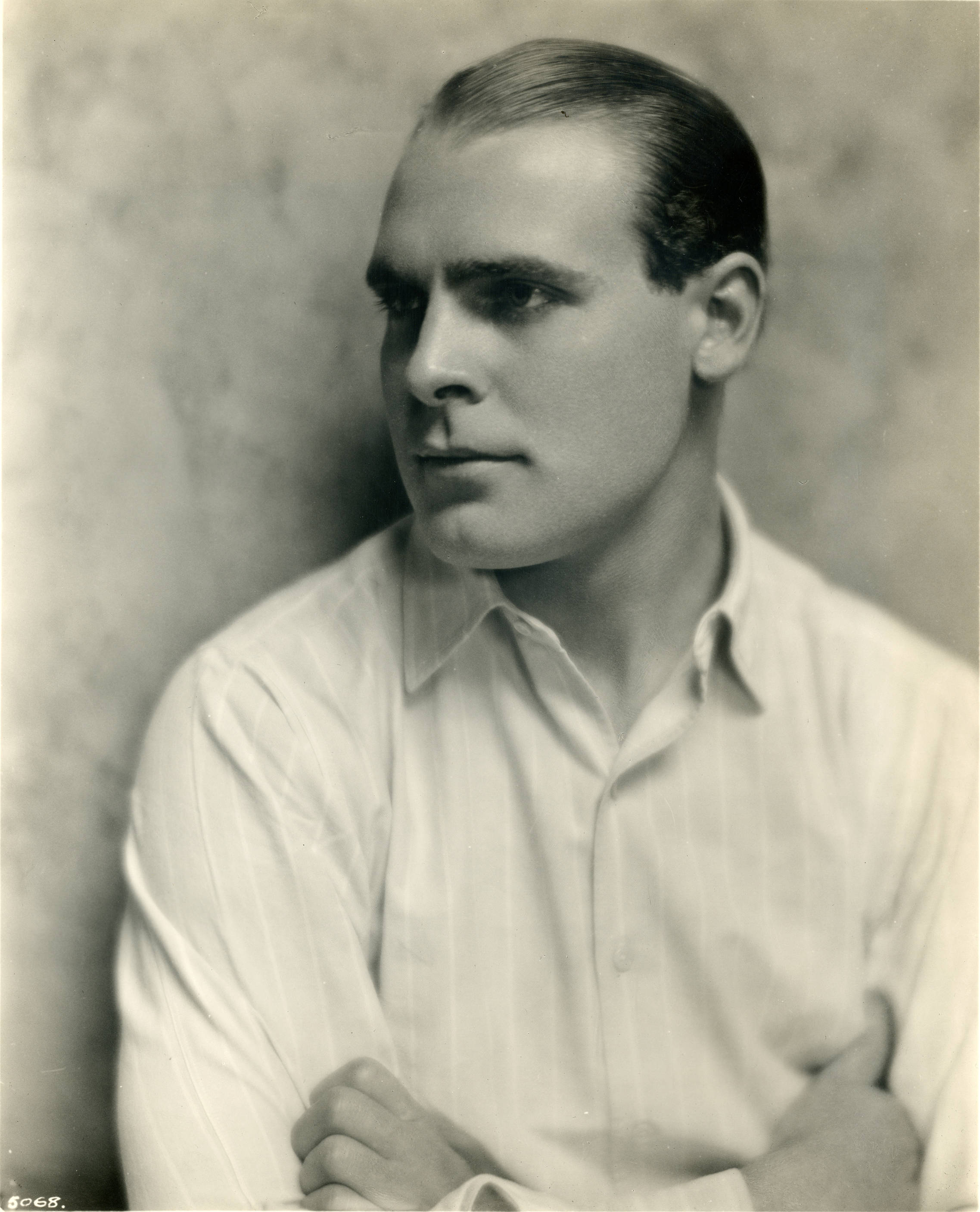
- Graves in 1924
- Born: Ralph Horsburgh; January 23, 1900; Cleveland, Ohio, U.S.
- Died: February 18, 1977 (aged 77); Santa Barbara, California, U.S.
- Occupations: Screenwriter; film director; actor
- Years active: 1918–1949

Ralph Graves (born Ralph Horsburgh; January 23, 1900 – February 18, 1977) was an American screenwriter, film director and actor who appeared in more than 90 films between 1918 and 1949.

== Biography ==
Born in Cleveland, Ohio, Graves had already been cast in 46 films, half of them produced by Mack Sennett, before he wrote, directed, and starred in Swell Hogan in 1926. That film was produced by Howard Hughes, whose father had once supported the young actor in the early stages of his career by placing him on the payroll of the Hughes Tool Company between screen assignments, even though Graves never actually worked there.

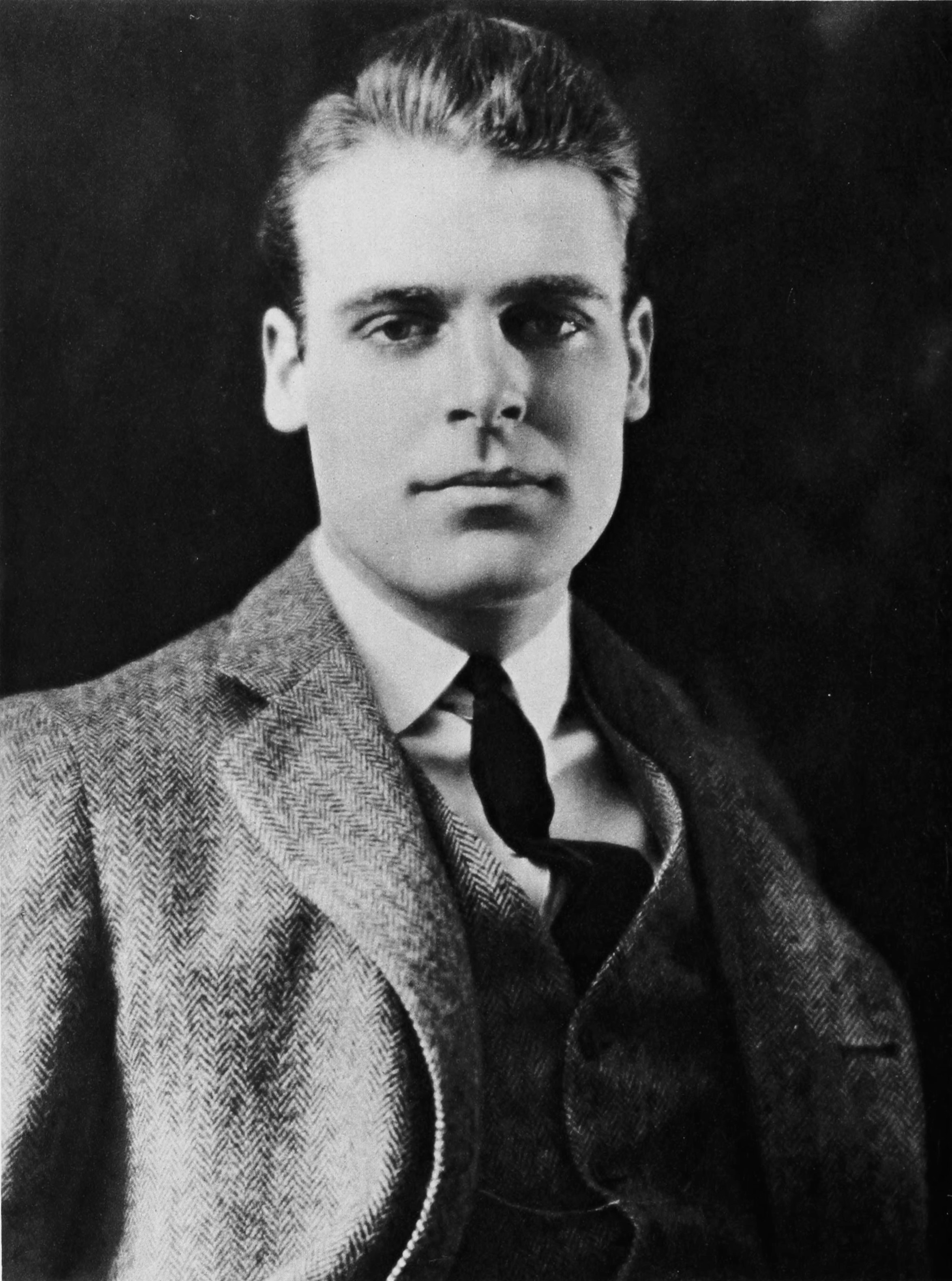
Photoplay, September 1921

Graves and the younger Hughes met on the Wilshire Country Club golf course, and over lunch the actor pitched a film about a Bowery bum who adopts a baby. The plot intrigued Hughes, who had a strong interest in Hollywood, and he invested $40,000 in the project. During filming he sat on the sidelines in order to familiarize himself with the technical aspects of production. The budget eventually doubled, and after seeing the completed film numerous times, Hughes hired Dorothy Arzner to help him re-edit it, but there was little they could do to salvage it.

When asked his opinion of it, Hughes' uncle, novelist and film director Rupert Hughes, said, "It's nothing. No plot. No build up. No character development. The acting stinks. Destroy the film. If anybody sees it, you and that homo Graves will be the laughing stock of Hollywood." Hughes took his uncle's advice and ordered the screening room projectionist to burn the sole copy. Graves later claimed he and Hughes had engaged in a sexual relationship while collaborating on Swell Hogan.

Despite this temporary setback, Graves directed four more films in 1927 and contributed the story or wrote the screenplay for 12 additional films, but most of his career was spent acting. While working for Sennett, Graves met director Frank Capra, who later cast him in several films, which include the 1929 release Flight, based on a story by Graves, as well as a series of adventure films with fellow actor Jack Holt.

Graves became engaged to actress Ann May after meeting her at the studio of D.W. Griffith.

Graves retired from films in 1949. He died in Santa Barbara, California, aged 77.

== Selected filmography ==
Year	Film	Role	Director	Notes
1918	Men Who Have Made Love to Me	The Callow Youth	Arthur Berthelet	
1918	Tinsel	Bobby Woodward	Oscar Apfel	
1918	The Sporting Life	John, Earl of Woodstock	Maurice Tourneur	
1918	The Yellow Dog	Tom Blakely	Colin Campbell	
1919	The Scarlet Shadow	Van Presby	Robert Z. Leonard	
1919	What Am I Bid?	Ralph McGibbon		
1919	The White Heather	Alec McClintock	Maurice Tourneur	
1919	The Home Town Girl	John Stanley	Robert G. Vignola	
1919	I'll Get Him Yet	Harold Packard	Elmer Clifton; Leigh R. Smith (assistant)	
1919	Nobody Home	Malcolm Dale	Elmer Clifton	
1919	Her Kingdom of Dreams	Billy Dayne	Marshall Neilan	
1919	Scarlet Days	John Randolph aka Sir Whiteheart	D. W. Griffith	
1919	The Greatest Question	John Hilton Jr.	D. W. Griffith	
1920	Mary Ellen Comes to Town	Bob Fairacres	Elmer Clifton	
1920	Little Miss Rebellion	Sgt. Richard Ellis	George Fawcett	
1920	Polly With a Past	Rex Van Zile	Leander de Cordova	
1921	Dream Street	James 'Spike' McFadden	D. W. Griffith	
1922	Kindred of the Dust	Donald McKaye	Raoul Walsh	
1922	Come on Over	Shane O'Mealia	Alfred E. Green	
1922	The Long Chance	Bob McGraw	Jack Conway	
1922	The Jilt	Sandy Sanderson	Irving Cummings	
1923	Mind Over Motor	Jasper McCutcheon	Ward Lascelle	
1923	The Ghost Patrol	Terry Rafferty	[2]	
1923	Just Like a Woman	James Landon	Hugh McClung	
1923	Prodigal Daughters	Roger Corbin	Sam Wood	
1923	The Extra Girl	Dave Giddings	F. Richard Jones	
1924	Off His Trolley	The Boy		
1924	Daughters of Today	Ralph Adams	Rollin S. Sturgeon	
1924	Yolanda	Maximillian of Styria	Robert G. Vignola	
1926	Womanpower	Johnny White Bromley	Harry Beaumont	
1926	Blarney	James Carabine	Marcel De Sano	
1926	The Country Beyond	Roger McKay	Irving Cummings	
1926	Swell Hogan			
1927	The Kid Sister		Ralph Graves	
1927	Rich Men's Sons	Arnold Treadway	Ralph Graves	
1927	Alias the Deacon	Jim Adams	Edward Sloman	
1927	The Swell-Head	Lefty Malone	Ralph Graves	
1927	A Reno Divorce	David	Ralph Graves	
1928	That Certain Thing	Andy B. Charles Jr.	Frank Capra	
1928	The Cheer Leader	Jimmy Grant	Alan James	
1928	Bachelor's Paradise	Joe Wallace	George Archainbaud	
1928	Submarine	Bob Mason	Frank Capra	
1928	Bitter Sweets	Ralph Horton	Charles Hutchison	
1928	The Sideshow	Gentleman Ted Rogers	Erle C. Kenton	
1929	The Flying Fleet	Steve Randall	George W. Hill	
1929	The Fatal Warning	Russell Thorne	Richard Thorpe	
1929	The Eternal Woman	Hartley Forbes	John P. McCarthy	
1929	Glad Rag Doll	John Fairchild	Michael Curtiz	
1929	The College Coquette		George Archainbaud	
1929	Flight	'Lefty' Phelps	Frank Capra	
1929	Song of Love	Tom Gibson	Erle C. Kenton	
1930	Ladies of Leisure	Jerry Strong	Frank Capra	
1930	Vengeance		Archie Mayo	
1930	Sisters		James Flood	
1930	Hell's Island	Griff	Edward Sloman	
1931	Dirigible	'Frisky' Pierce	Frank Capra	
1931	Hell Divers		George W. Hill (uncredited)	
1931	Salvation Nell	Jim Platt	James Cruze	
1931	A Dangerous Affair	Wally Cook	Edward Sedgwick	
1931	West of Broadway		Harry Beaumont	
1932	When a Feller Needs a Friend	Mr. Tom Randall	Harry A. Pollard	
1932	Huddle	Coach Malcolm Gale	Sam Wood	
1932	Scandal for Sale		Russell Mack	
1932	War Correspondent	Franklyn Bennett	Paul Sloane	
1934	Ticket to a Crime	Clay Holt	Lewis D. Collins	
1934	Born to Be Bad		Lowell Sherman	
1935	Speed Limited	Jerry Paley	Albert Herman	
1936	The Black Coin	Walter Prescott		
1937	Outlaws of the Orient		Ernest B. Schoedsack	
1939	The Flying Irishman	First Man Grounding Doug in New York (uncredited)	Leigh Jason	
1939	Street of Missing Men	Mike Reardon	Sidney Salkow	
1939	Three Texas Steers	George Ward	George Sherman	
1939	Eternally Yours	Mr. Morrisey	Charles Kerr (assistant)	
1944	Double Exposure		William Berke	
1947	The Spirit of West Point	Burt (uncredited)	Ralph Murphy	
1949	Amazon Quest	Anna's Attorney	Steve Sekely	
1949	Batman and Robin	Winslow Harrison [Chs. 7–8]	Spencer Gordon Bennet	
1949	Alimony	George W. Griswold / Curtis P. Carter	Alfred Zeisler	
1949	Joe Palooka in the Counterpunch	Dr. Colman		
