= The Princess of Park Row =

- Directed by: Ashley Miller
- Written by: A. Van Buren Powell; Paul West
- Produced by: Albert E. Smith
- Distributed by: Greater Vitagraph (V-L-S-E)
- Release date: October 1, 1917
- Running time: 5 reels
- Country: USA
- Language: Silent...English intertitles

The Princess of Park Row is a lost 1917 silent film comedy drama directed by Ashley Miller with Mildred Manning and Wallace MacDonald in the leads.

== Cast ==
- Mildred Manning - Margot
- Wallace MacDonald - Tom Kearney
- William R. Dunn - Kronski (*William Dunn)
- John Costello - Niclos
- Ann Brody - Berta (*Anne Brody)
- Lillian Walker - ?
