= A Chance Deception =

1913 film

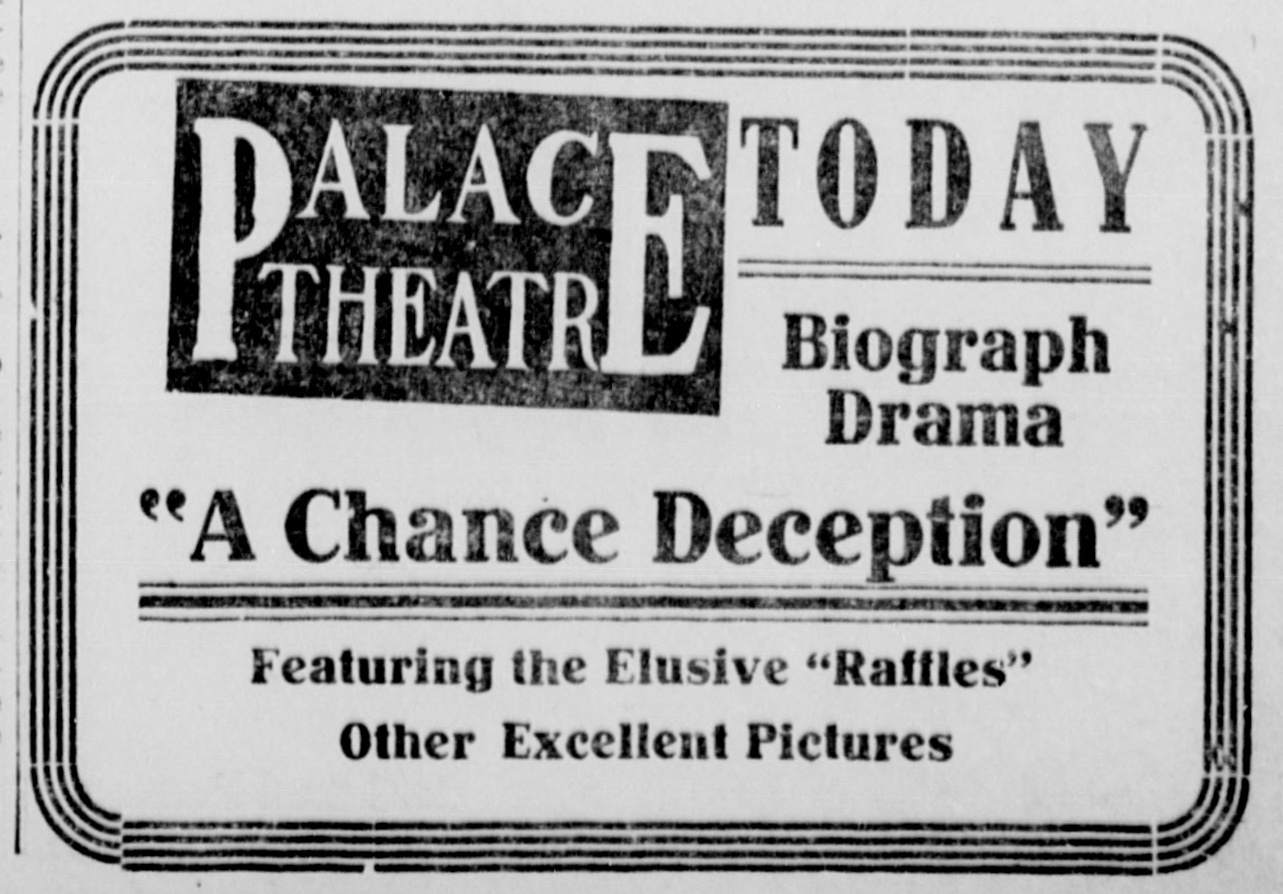
- Newspaper advertisement
- Directed by: D. W. Griffith
- Written by: Christy Cabanne
- Starring: Blanche Sweet
- Cinematography: G. W. Bitzer
- Distributed by: Biograph Company; General Film Company
- Release date: February 24, 1913
- Running time: 17 minutes (16 frame/s)
- Country: United States
- Language: Silent (English intertitles)

A Chance Deception is a 1913 American drama film directed by D. W. Griffith and starring Blanche Sweet.

== Cast ==
- Blanche Sweet as the wife
- Charles Hill Mailes as the jealous husband
- Harry Carey as Raffles
- Mildred Manning as Raffles' woman
- John T. Dillon as the waiter
- Lionel Barrymore as a policeman
- Dorothy Bernard as the maid (unconfirmed)
- Christy Cabanne as undetermined role
- Adolph Lestina as a visitor
- Wilfred Lucas as in restaurant (unconfirmed)
- Joseph McDermott as a policeman

== See also ==
- List of American films of 1913
- Harry Carey filmography
- D. W. Griffith filmography
- Blanche Sweet filmography
- Lionel Barrymore filmography
