= That Certain Thing (film) =

1928 film by Frank Capra

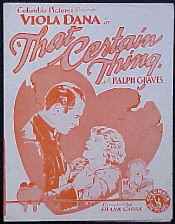
- lobby poster
- Directed by: Frank Capra
- Written by: Frank Capra; Elmer Harris
- Produced by: Harry Cohn; Frank Capra
- Starring: Viola Dana; Ralph Graves; Burr McIntosh; Aggie Herring
- Cinematography: Joseph Walker
- Edited by: Arthur Roberts
- Production company: Columbia Pictures
- Distributed by: Columbia Pictures
- Release date: January 1, 1928
- Running time: 69 minutes
- Country: United States
- Languages: Silent; English intertitles

That Certain Thing is a 1928 American silent comedy film directed by Frank Capra. It was Capra's first film for Harry Cohn's Columbia Pictures.

== Plot ==
That Certain Thing (1928)

Molly Kelly intends to marry a millionaire. When she meets Andy Charles Jr., heir to a restaurant fortune, she sees her chance and marries him. Upon discovering the marriage, Andy's father becomes irate and disinherits his son. Andy attempts life as a ditch-digger to support his wife, but the results are not what he had hoped for.

== Cast ==
- Viola Dana as Molly Kelly
- Ralph Graves as Andy B. Charles Jr.
- Burr McIntosh as A.B. Charles Sr.
- Aggie Herring as Maggie Kelly
- Carl Gerard as Secretary Brooks
- Syd Crossley as Valet

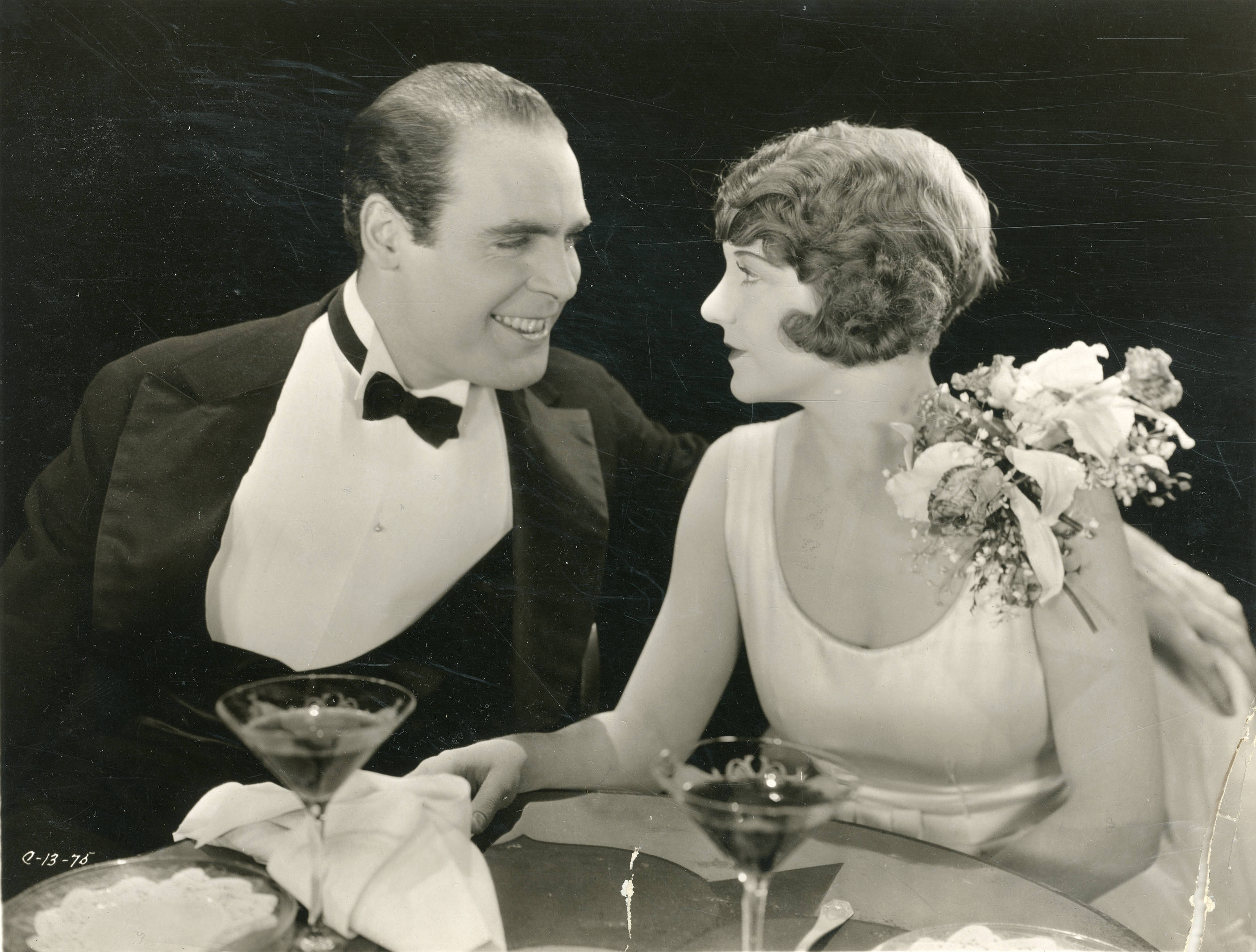
Scene from the movie

== Preservation status ==
- Prints survive in the Library of Congress Packard Campus collection, George Eastman Museum Motion Picture Collection, UCLA Film & Television Archive, National Archives of Canada (Ottawa), and the Cineteca Del Friuli (Gemona).
