= Brian Oswald Donn-Byrne =

Irish novelist (1889–1928)

Donn Byrne (born Brian Oswald Patrick Donn-Byrne; 20 November 1889 – 18 June 1928) was an Irish writer. Several of his works were adapted to film. Writer Dorothea Donn-Byrne (Dolly Byrne) was his wife.

== Early life ==
Born in New York City in the United States, he claimed his Irish parents were on a business trip at the time and soon returned with him to Ireland. He grew up in Camlough, County Armagh, and was equally fluent in Irish and English.

In 1906, when he was 14, Donn-Byrne went to an Irish Volunteer Movement meeting with Bulmer Hobson and Robert Lynd of the London Daily News, where Lynd noticed him, a fair-haired boy, and wrote of his singing. It was through Hobson that Byrne acquired his taste for Irish history and nationalism. (The "taste for nationalism" cited, is contested by Bradley. Many may confuse widespread interest in Irish Language and Byrne's excellence in the language, his prizes at feiseanna (festivals) with a more revolutionary political movement engaged in by Hobson and other associates).

He attended Trinity College Dublin, beginning in 1907, where he studied Romance languages and saw his own writing published in The National Student, the student magazine. After graduation he continued his studies in Europe, hoping to join the British Foreign Office. It is related that he "turned down his PhD" when he learned that he would have to wear evening clothes to his early morning examinations, which he apparently felt that no true Irish gentleman would ever do. (The latter claim is shown by Bradley to be just one of Byrne's impossible, if entertaining, fantasies.)

== Career in the United States ==
He returned to New York in 1911, where he began working first for the publishers of the Catholic Encyclopedia, the New Standard Dictionary, and then the Century Dictionary. In February 1912 his poem "The Piper" appeared in Harper's magazine. His first short story, "Battle", sold soon after to Smart Set magazine for $50, appearing in the February 1914 issue. He sold more stories; some of these were anthologised in his first book, Stories Without Women, 1915.

He began working on his first novel, The Stranger's Banquet (1919). He became a prolific novelist and short story writer from that point on.

== Return to Ireland ==
Despite both his wife Dorothea's success as a playwright, and his own increasing popularity as an author, Byrne's financial straits forced his family to sell their house in Riverside, Connecticut, and return to Ireland.

They later purchased Coolmain Castle, near Bandon in County Cork, where Byrne lived until his death in a car accident due to defective steering, in June 1928. A Kilbrittain man, Cornelius O'Sullivan, pulled him from the water and tried to revive him, but to no avail. He is buried in Rathclarin churchyard, near Coolmain Castle. His headstone reads, in Irish and English: "I am in my sleeping and don't waken me."

== Writings ==
The early novels have been said to be quite mediocre, noted as "potboilers" by Thurston Macauley, Byrne's earliest biographer. Messer Marco Polo tells the story of the Italian adventurer as told by an Irishman, and The Wind Bloweth is a romantic novel of the sea. Both show some highly lyrical passages intermixed with the plain language of real life. With Blind Raftery, however, the author seems to reinvent the saga style, as the prose breaks off into musical verse now and then as it tells the story of a blind poet wandering Ireland and avenging his wife's dishonor. A television opera by Joan Trimble based on the novel was commissioned and broadcast by the BBC in 1957.

The wind bloweth, readable pdf

His later novels invited comparison with Irish novelist George Moore, especially in their romance and historical themes. It was with Hangman's House, though, that he began to identify himself with the traditional Irish storytellers, noting in his preface ("A Foreword to Foreigner's") that: "I have written a book of Ireland for Irishmen. Some phrase, some name in it may conjure up the world they knew as children." It is also in this novel that Byrne returns to his Irish nationalist ideas by alluding to the ongoing strife of the Irish Civil War and fight for Independence.

Byrne was firmly of the neo-romantic view of the mythical and pastoral beauty of Irish history. His writing evokes these images, sometimes seeming to want to preserve them. "It seemed to me," he says in Wind, "that I was capturing for an instant a beauty that was dying slowly, imperceptibly, but would soon be gone." His simple narrative style recalls the atmosphere of ancient oral epics such as Táin Bó Cúailnge and the Epic of Gilgamesh.

His novel Field of Honor was published posthumously in 1929. His poems were collected into an anthology and published as Poems (1934). Some of his works were published in the United Kingdom under different titles. These are noted after the American title.

== Novels ==
- The Stranger's Banquet (1919)
- The Foolish Matrons (1920)
- Messer Marco Polo (1922)
- The Wind Bloweth (1922) (illustrated by George Bellows)

Messer Marco Polo, resdable pdf

- Blind Raftery and His Wife Hilaria (1924)
- O'Malley of Shanganagh, or An Untitled Story (1925)
- Hangman's House (1926)
- Brother Saul (1927)
- Crusade (1928) (Historical novel about the adventures of an Irish mercenary in the Sixth Crusade)
- Field of Honor, or The Power of the Dog (1929)
- A Party of Bacarat, or The Golden Goat (1930)

== Short story collections ==
Doherty, 1997, provides a complete index of the short stories.

- Stories Without Women (And A Few With Women) (1915)
- Changeling, and Other Stories (1923)
- Destiny Bay (1928)
- Rivers of Damascus, and Other Stories (1931)
- A Woman of the Shee, and Other Stories (1932), or Sargasso Sea, and Other Stories
- The Island of Youth, and Other Stories (1933)
- An Alley of Flashing Spears, and Other Stories (1934)
- A Daughter of the Medici, and Other Stories (1935)
- The Hound of Ireland, and Other Stories (1935)

== Poetry and travelogue ==
- Ireland, The Rock Whence I Was Hewn (1929)
- Poems (1934)

== Filmography ==
- The Foolish Matrons (1921), adapted from his 1920 novel of the same name
- The Bride's Play (1922), adapted from his story
- The Strangers' Banquet (1922), adapted from his novel of the same name
- Blarney (1926), adapted from his story "In Praise of John Carabine"
- Hangman's House (1928), adapted from his novel of the same name
- His Captive Woman (1929), adapted from his story "Kingdom for a Woman"
- Wings of the Morning (1937), adapted from his story

== Sources ==
- Author and Bookinfo.com

== Works About Donn Byrne ==
- Bannister, Henry S. (1982). Donn Byrne: A Descriptive Bibliography, 1912–1935. New York: Garland.
- Doherty, John J. (1997). "Donn Byrne: An Annotated Bibliography." Bulletin of Bibliography. 54(2): 101–105.
- Doherty, J. J. (1999). Donn-Byrne, Brian Oswald. In J. A. Garraty & M. C. Carnes (Eds.), American National Biography (Vol. 6, pp. 724–725). New York, NY: Oxford University Press.
- Macauley, Thurston. (1929). Donn Byrne: Bard of Armagh. New York: Century.
- Wetherbee, Winthrop Jr. (1949). Donn Byrne: A Bibliography. New York: The New York Public Library.
