= A Reno Divorce =

1927 film by Ralph Graves

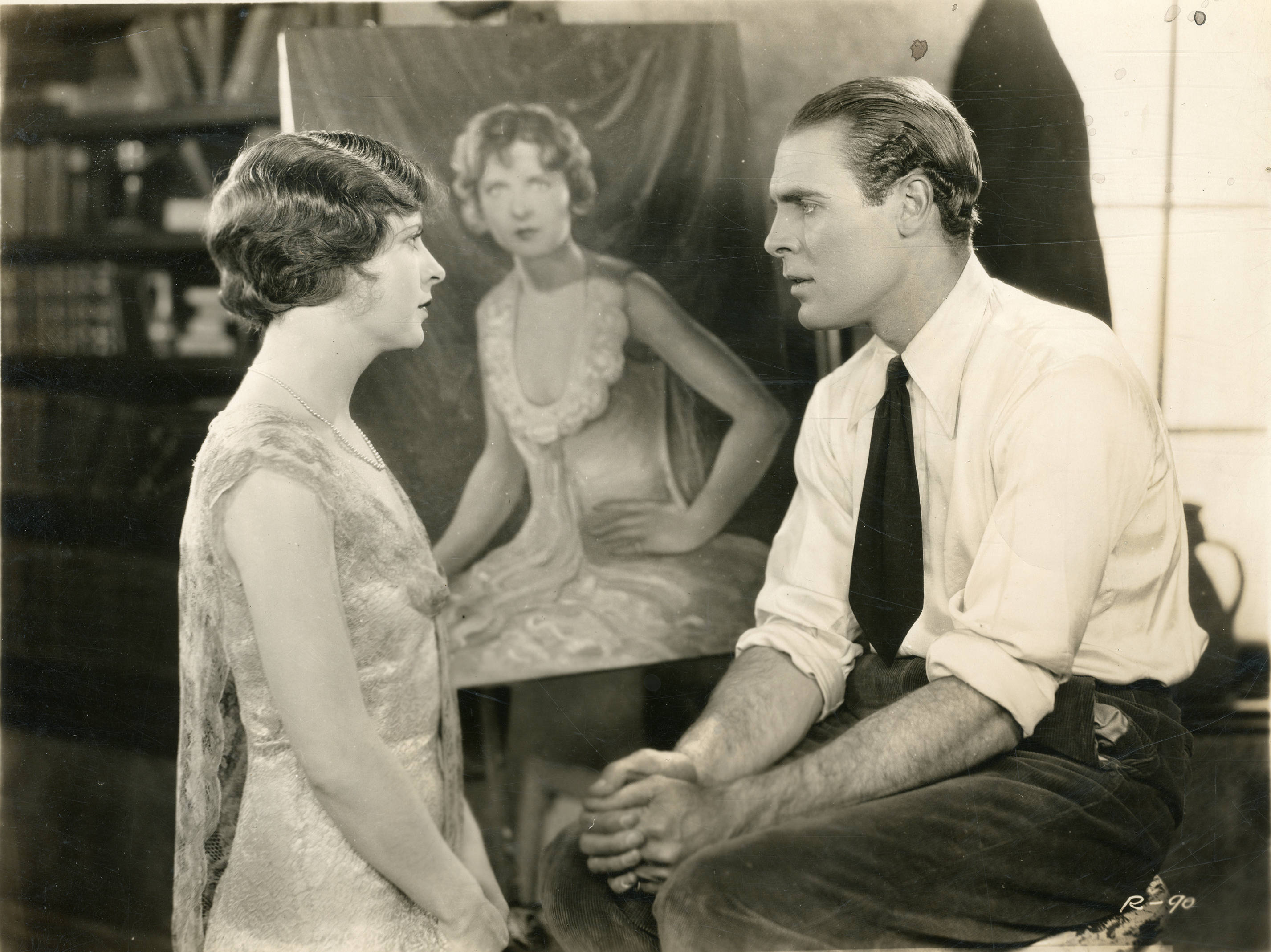
- Scene from A Reno Divorce
- Directed by: Ralph Graves
- Written by: Robert Lord (scenario)
- Story by: Ralph Graves
- Starring: May McAvoy; Ralph Graves
- Cinematography: Norbert Brodine
- Production company: Warner Bros.
- Distributed by: Warner Bros.
- Release date: October 22, 1927
- Running time: 60 minutes
- Country: United States
- Languages: Sound (Synchronized) (English Intertitles)

A Reno Divorce is a 1927 American synchronized sound romantic drama film produced and distributed by Warner Bros. While the film has no audible dialogue, it was released with a synchronized musical score with sound effects using the Vitaphone sound-on-disc process. Ralph Graves wrote, directed and stars in this film which was the last of the five films he ever directed. The visual portion of the film is now considered lost. The soundtrack survives on Vitaphone discs.

== Plot ==
Carla, a spirited and charming debutante, is motoring to her country estate when she accidentally strikes a pedestrian. Though the man is only mildly injured, Carla insists on taking him to her home to recover. The stranger introduces himself as David, a struggling artist. He is, in truth, the estranged son of a wealthy steel magnate who disinherited him when he refused to give up his art.

Carla is drawn to David's youthful candor and artistic soul. He feigns lingering injuries to prolong his stay, but when his ruse is discovered, he confesses it was her presence—not comfort—that he craved. Carla, touched, allows him to stay—if he'll paint her dog. “If you do him justice,” she adds teasingly, “I might let you paint me.”

Soon, Carla hosts a weekend house party attended by her closest friends, Hedda and Eric Frane, who, despite a recent Reno divorce, maintain a wry camaraderie. Hedda, ever on the prowl, sets her sights on David, while Eric—a suave schemer—hopes to win Carla's hand, having long admired her.

Carla, however, harbors a dangerous flaw: an addiction to gambling, particularly roulette. Eric, aware of her weakness, devises a plan—he wires the roulette wheel to rig the game in his favor. During the party, he challenges Carla: if he wins a final spin, she must marry him; if she wins, she regains her losses. Carla takes the bait—and loses.

But as victory sinks in, Eric is ashamed of his manipulation. He overturns the table, revealing the trick wiring, and confesses everything. Carla, stunned yet deeply moved by his honesty, kisses him gently—grateful for his integrity.

David, witnessing the moment from above, misinterprets it. Jealous and heartbroken, he denounces Carla, accusing her of toying with his affections. Carla, wounded by his harsh judgment, flees. Eric soon finds David and clears up the misunderstanding, urging him to go to Carla, the woman he truly loves.

That night, David climbs the trellis to Carla's balcony to apologize. “I don’t want to be on your level,” he says. “I want to look up at you, always.” Then he leaves—too ashamed to stay.

Moments later, Carla is attacked by a lurking figure in the shadows. She screams. David, hearing her cry, bursts in—only to be wrongly accused of the assault. The household rushes in and discovers the real culprit: Carla's drunken chauffeur, who confesses to harboring a twisted desire for his mistress. Carla races to David's room to beg forgiveness—he is gone.

Months pass. Carla searches the world for her lost love. Hedda, however, has found him. She bankrolls a European art tour, hoping to claim him for herself. But when David boards the ship and finds Hedda in his stateroom, he bolts.

In the corridor, he runs into Carla and Eric, who have come to bid Hedda farewell. Without a word, David sweeps Carla into her car and drives off—having finally realized what—and who—he truly wants.

Back on the ship, Hedda, in full glamor, emerges from her stateroom—only to find her ex-husband as the sole audience for her elaborate toilette.

== Cast ==
- May McAvoy as Carla
- Ralph Graves as David
- Hedda Hopper as Hedda Frane
- Robert Ober as Eric Frane
- William Demarest as James, the chauffeur
- Anders Randolf as David's father
- Edwards Davis as Judge

== Censorship ==
When A Reno Divorce was released, many states and cities in the United States had censor boards that could require cuts or other eliminations before the film could be shown. The Kansas censor board ordered a cut of an intertitle card with the caption, "All my life I've wanted a baby."

== See also ==
- List of early sound feature films (1926–1929)
- List of early Warner Bros. sound and talking features
