= Rich Men's Sons =

1927 film

- Directed by: Ralph Graves
- Written by: Dorothy Howell
- Produced by: Harry Cohn
- Starring: Ralph Graves; Shirley Mason; Robert Cain
- Cinematography: Norbert Brodine
- Production company: Columbia Pictures
- Distributed by: Columbia Pictures
- Release date: May 20, 1927
- Running time: 57 minutes
- Country: United States
- Languages: Silent; English intertitles

Rich Men's Sons is a 1927 American silent drama film directed by Ralph Graves and starring Graves, Shirley Mason and Robert Cain.

== Cast ==
- Ralph Graves as Arnold Treadway
- Shirley Mason as Carla Gordon
- Robert Cain as Niles McCray
- Frances Raymond as Mrs. Treadway
- George Fawcett as Samuel Treadway
- Johnny Fox as The Office Boy
- Scott Seaton as John Gordon

== Preservation and status ==
A complete copy of the film is held at the La Corse Et Le Cinéma.

== Bibliography ==
- Langman, Larry. American Film Cycles: The Silent Era. Greenwood Publishing, 1998.
