= An Enemy to the King =

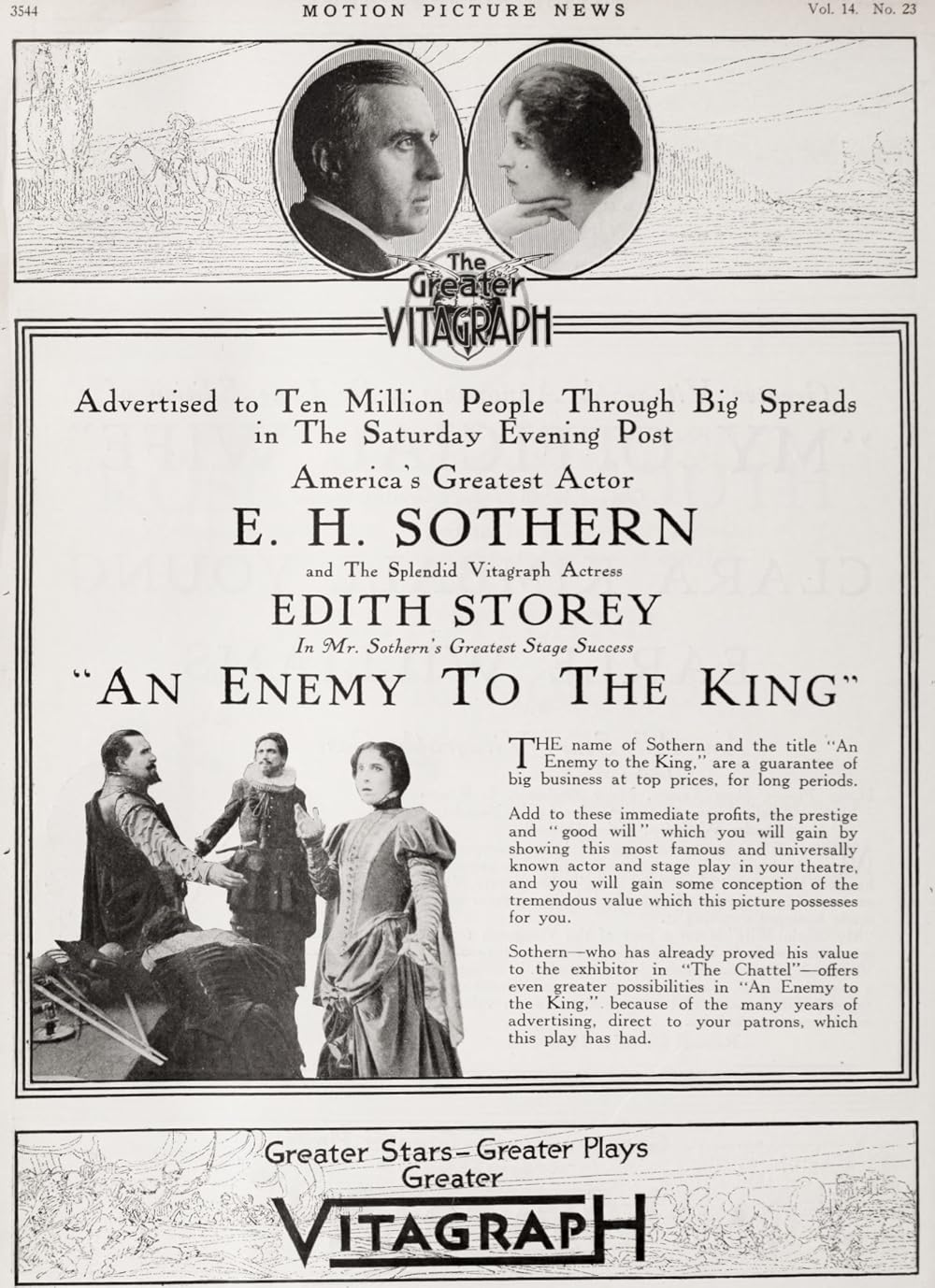
- Directed by: Frederick A. Thomson
- Screenplay by: Helmer Walton Bergman
- Based on: the play by Robert N. Stephens
- Starring: E.H. Sothern; Edith Storey; John S. Robertson
- Production company: Vitagraph Company of America
- Release date: November 26, 1916
- Running time: 60 minutes
- Country: United States

An Enemy to the King is a 1916 silent film directed by Frederick A. Thomson.

The screenplay is based on the play An Enemy to the King by Robert Neilson Stephens which was first performed on Broadway at the Lyceum Theatre on 1 September 1896.

== Plot ==
In sixteenth-century France, Julie de Varion is told that her father, a Huguenot sympathiser, may be freed if she helps to capture Ernanton De Launay, an enemy of the king. In a tavern Julie meets a man who promises to bring her to Ernanton. In reality, the man in the tavern is Ernanton himself, who soon falls in love with Julie. He kills his own servant when the latter insists that she is a spy. In the end he discovers that Julie is working for the king, but, at the moment of betraying him, she refuses to hand him over to the king's men because she too has fallen in love. Ernanton follows her to the palace and gives himself up in order to save her father. When the Huguenots attack the palace, Julie's father is freed and Ernanton makes his escape.

== Production ==
The film was produced by the Vitagraph Company of America.

== Distribution ==
Distributed by Greater Vitagraph (V-L-S-E, Incorporated), the film opened in US cinemas on 26 November 1916.

== Cast ==
- E.H. Sothern: Ernanton de Launay
- Edith Storey: Julie De Varion
- John S. Robertson (as John Robertson): Claude Le Chastre
- Frederick Lewis (as Fred Lewis): Gauillaume Montignac
- Brinsley Shaw: Enrico, viscount de Berguin
- Rowland Buckstone: Blaise Tripault
- Mildred Manning: Jeanotte
- Pierre Collosse (as Pierre Colosse): Rougin
- Charles Mussett (as Charles Muzitt): Henry of Navarre
- Denton Vane: King Henry III
- John Ardizoni (as Adrizonu): the Duc de Guise
