= Blarney (1926 film) =

1925 film

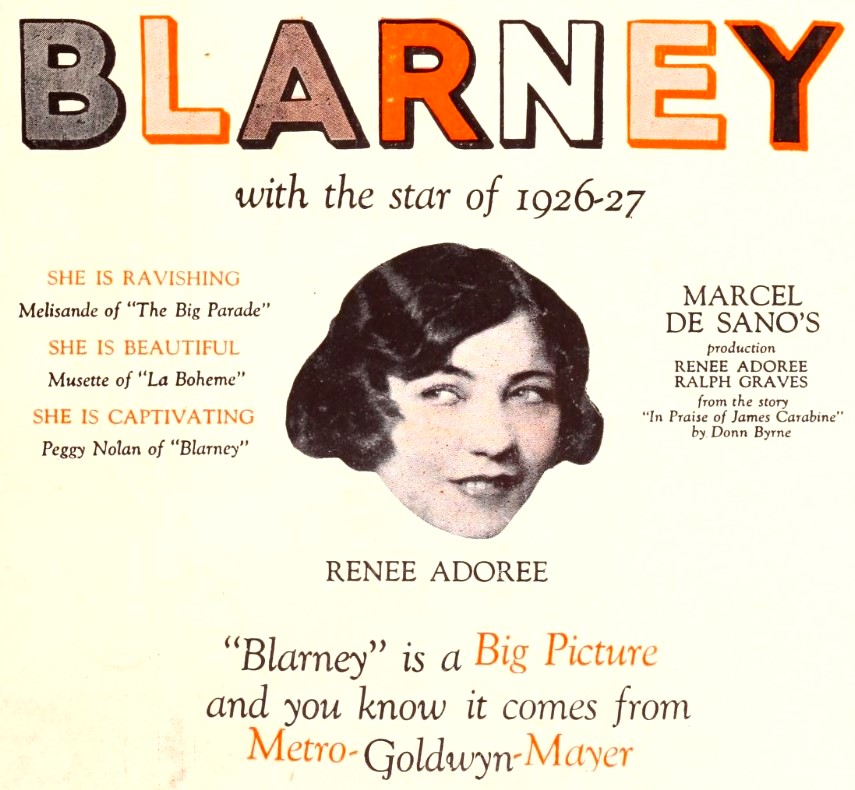
- Advertisement from magazine cover page
- Directed by: Marcel De Sano
- Written by: Marcel De Sano; Albert E. Lewin; Joseph Farnham (titles)
- Based on: "In Praise of John Carabine" by Brian Oswald Donn-Byrne
- Starring: Ralph Graves; Paulette Duval; Renée Adorée
- Cinematography: Ben Reynolds
- Distributed by: Metro-Goldwyn-Mayer
- Release date: September 26, 1925 (United States)
- Running time: 50 minutes
- Country: United States
- Language: Silent (English intertitles)

Blarney is a 1926 American silent melodrama film directed by Marcel De Sano, and starring Ralph Graves, Paulette Duval, and Renée Adorée. The film is based on the short story "In Praise of John Carabine" by Brian Oswald Donn-Byrne.

== Plot ==
James, an Irish prizefighter, becomes involved with two New York girls.

== Cast ==
- Renée Adorée as Peggy Nolan
- Ralph Graves as James Carabine
- Paulette Duval as Marcolina
- Malcolm Waite as Blanco Johnson
- Margaret Seddon as Peggy's Aunt
