= Mildred Manning =

American 20th-century actress

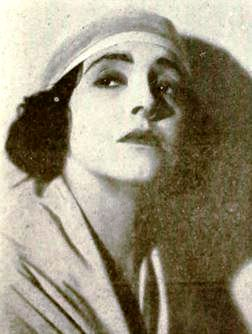
Mildred Manning

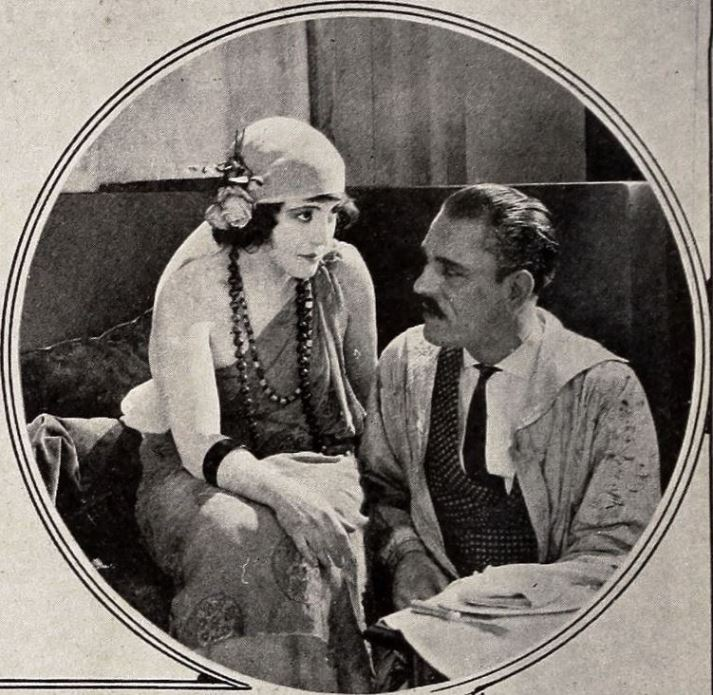
With Lon Chaney.

Mildred Manning was an American actress who appeared in films. She had a starring role in the 1917 film adaptation of Edith Ellis' play Mary Jane's Pa. She was also cast in a starring role in Next Door to Nancy. She was cast as the heroine in The Princess of Park Row.

She performed in Broadway shows with singing and dancing roles where she was discovered by D. W. Griffith who cast her in Biograph films. She later worked with Vitagraph. She was an outdoors enthusiast who rode horses and shot rifles.

She was in the O. Henry series produced by Broadway Star Features Co. (part of Vitagraph).

== Filmography ==
- A Chance Deception (1913) as Raffles' Woman
- A Mother's Atonement (1915) as Dorothy Hilton
- An Enemy to the King (1916) as Jeanotte
- Vanity and Some Sables (1917)
- The Last Leaf (1917)
- Love Philtre of Ikey Schoenstein (1917)
- Gold that Glittered (1917)
- The Green Door (1917)
- The Mraionettes (1917)
- Past One at Roomey's (1917)
- The Third Ingredient (1917)
- The Thing's the Play (1917)
- A Service of Love (1917)
- The Princess of Park Row (1917) as Margot
- The Marriage Speculation (1917) as Clara Wilson
- Mary Jane's Pa (1917) as Mary Jane
- The Unchastened Woman (1918) as Emily Madden
- The Westerners (1919) as Prue Welch / Molly Lafond
- Kitty Kelly, M.D. (1919) as Lola
- The Foolish Matrons (1921)
- While Paris Sleeps (1923) as model Bebe Larvache
- The Acquittal (1923) as Mrs. Crown
