= Cheaper to Marry =

1925 film by Robert Zigler Leonard

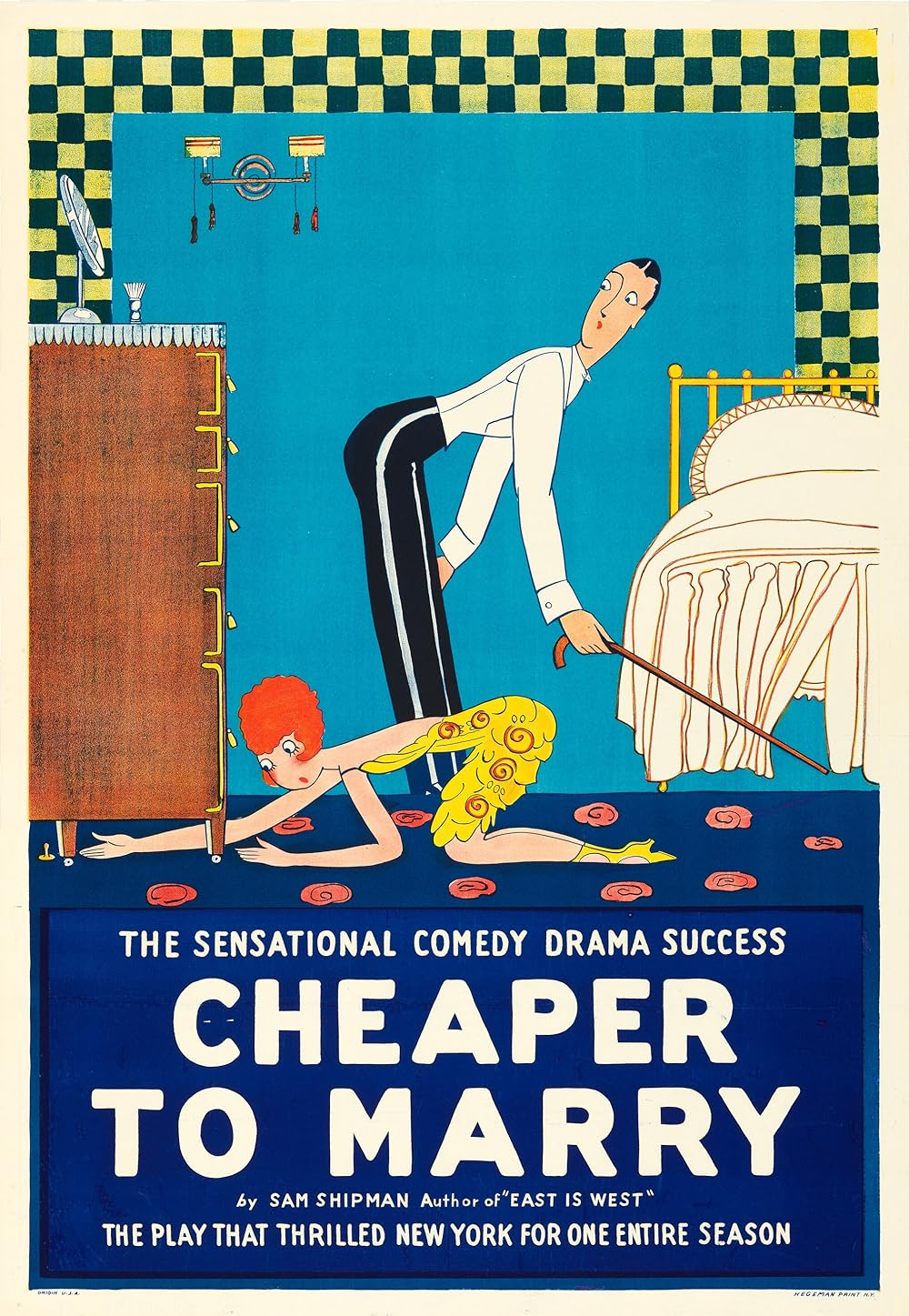
- Directed by: Robert Z. Leonard
- Written by: Alice D. G. Miller
- Based on: Cheaper to Marry by Samuel Shipman
- Starring: Conrad Nagel; Lewis Stone; Marguerite De La Motte; Paulette Duval
- Cinematography: André Barlatier
- Distributed by: Metro-Goldwyn-Mayer
- Release date: February 9, 1925
- Running time: 70 minutes
- Country: United States
- Language: Silent (English intertitles)

Cheaper to Marry is a 1925 American film starring Conrad Nagel, Lewis Stone, Marguerite De La Motte and Paulette Duval. The film was directed by Robert Z. Leonard, and written by Alice D. G. Miller based upon a play by Samuel Shipman.

== Plot ==
As described in a review in a film magazine, on being taken into the Wall Street broker firm of Knight & Tylor, Dick Tyler proposes to Doris, an artist, and is accepted. On hearing this, his older and more experienced partner Jim Knight tells him that he is making a mistake as a wife interferes too much with a young man in business. Attending a dinner given by her old schoolmate Evelyn, Doris is impressed by her luxurious mode of living. Dick is surprised to find that Jim is there and soon learns that Evelyn is his partner's mistress. A crisis arises in the business and it develops that Jim has squandered the firm's surplus on Evelyn. Jim goes to her for aid but she turns him down. Doris pleads with a banker friend, who is so much impressed that he agrees to accept Dick's personal note to tide them over. They go to inform Jim, but find that Jim has taken his own life. The banker marries Doris' friend Flora. The two couples, contrasting their situation own with Jim' experience, decide it is better in every way and cheaper to marry.

== Cast ==
- Conrad Nagel as Dick Tyler
- Lewis Stone as Jim Knight
- Paulette Duval as Evelyn
- Marguerite De La Motte as Doris
- Louise Fazenda as Flora
- Claude Gillingwater as Riddle
- Richard Wayne as Dal Whitney

== Preservation ==
With no prints of Cheaper to Marry located in any film archives, it is a lost film.
