= Paulette Duval =

Argentinan-born French actress (1889–1951)

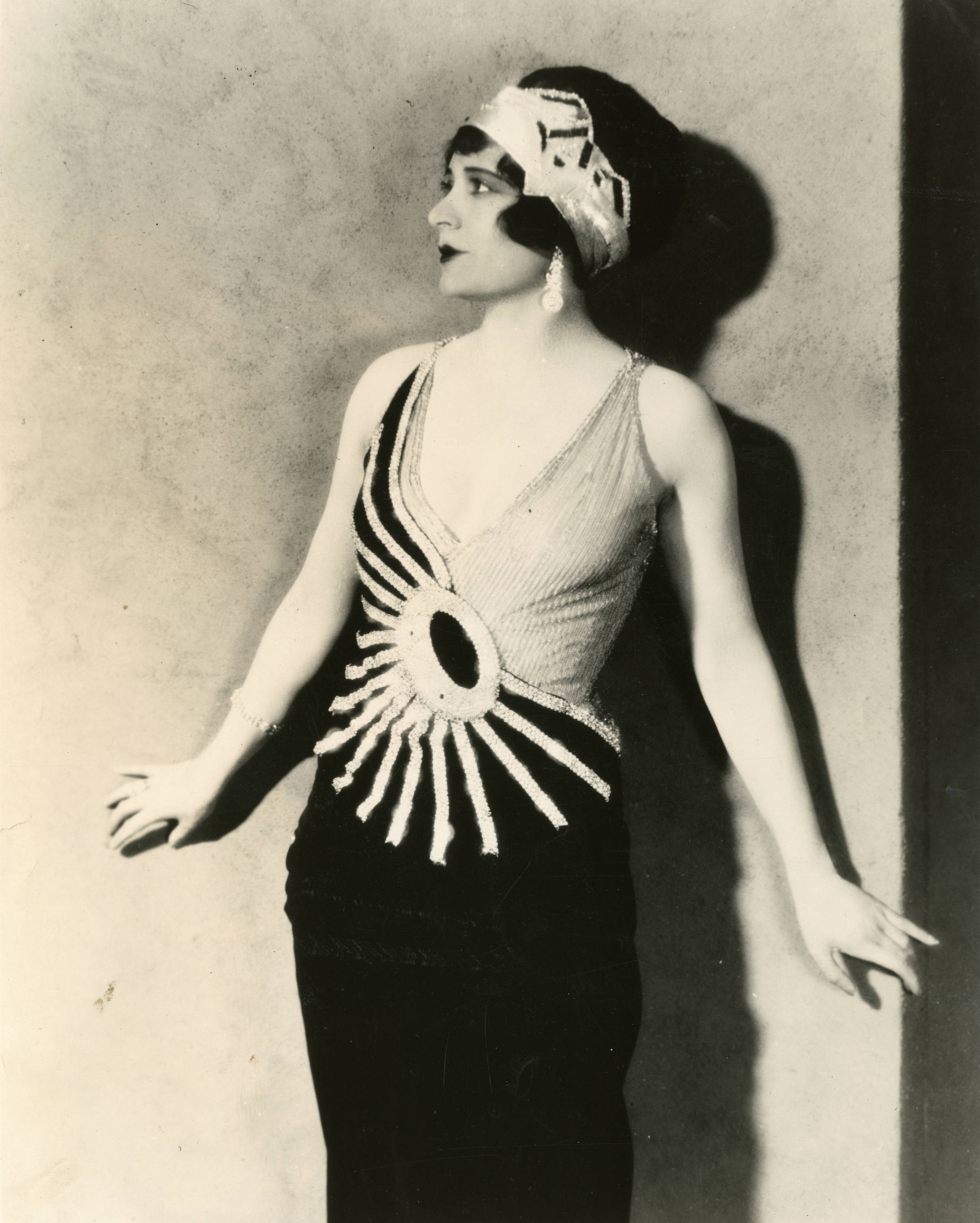
- Duval in 1925
- Born: May 5, 1889; Buenos Aires, Argentina
- Died: June 12, 1951 (aged 62); Paris, France
- Occupations: Actress, dancer
- Years active: 1920–1933
- Children: 1

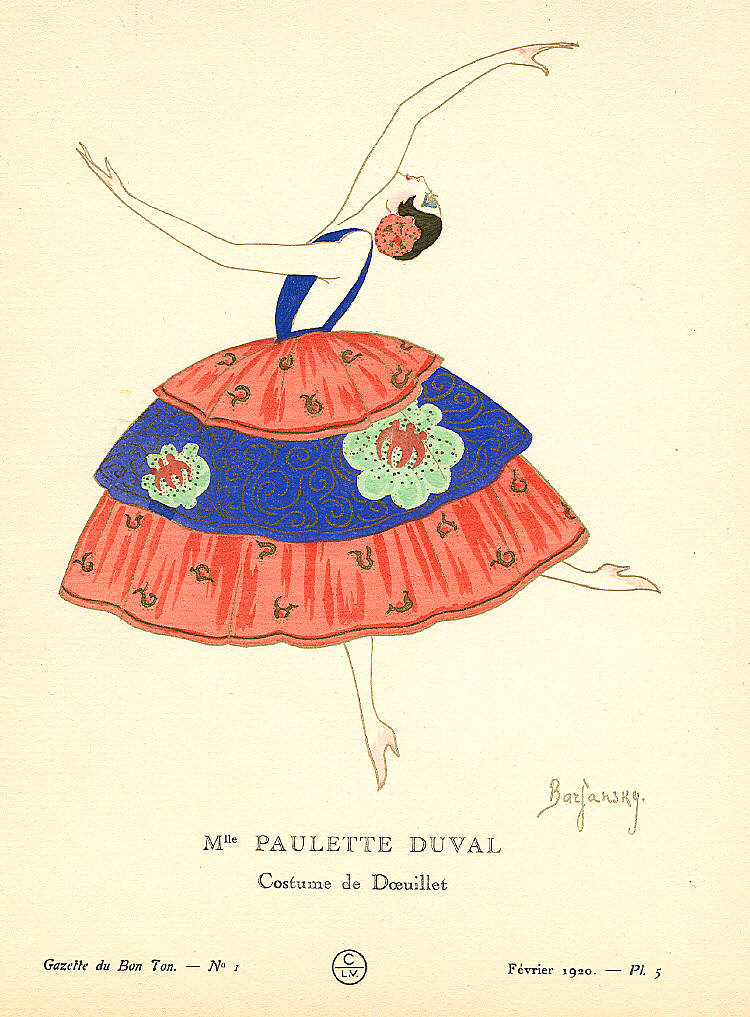
Illustration of Duval by Vladimir Barjansky, 1920

Paulette Duval (French pronunciation: [polɛt dyval]; 1889 – 1951) was a French dancer and actress of the silent film era and early sound motion pictures. She was born in Buenos Aires, Argentina in 1889 and raised in France. She was considered one of the most beautiful women in Paris in the early 20th century. Paulette was recruited by Florenz Ziegfeld for the Ziegfeld Follies, which opened at the New Amsterdam Theater in New York City on October 15, 1923. Before joining the Follies, the French beauty was engaged with the Scandals dance productions of George White.

== Fashion conscious film actress ==
Duval was in Hollywood movies from 1919 to 1933. She is widely known for her role Madame de Pompadour in Monsieur Beaucaire. Rudolph Valentino starred with Duval in the 1924 production based on a novel written by Booth Tarkington. In 1925, she played the role of a vamp in the film version of Cheaper to Marry. The movie was based on the noted stage play written by Samuel Shipman. Paulette played a young woman who was embittered by the cynicism of the man she intended to marry. The MGM motion picture featured many of the clothes the French actress brought from Paris as well as evening attire and furs furnished by the studio costume department. From her own possessions Miss Duval gave Norma Talmadge a $5,000 headdress. Paulette introduced knee muffs to Hollywood in 1926. Maurice Gebber, a fur importer, made the muffs from Russian sable after a design by Paulette Duval. She appeared with Marion Davies in Beverly of Graustark in Spring 1926.

Her final film was Lidoire (1933), a short film directed by Maurice Tourneur, in which Duval played the character of La Dame.

== Daughter in movies ==
In 1952 Paulette's daughter Jacqueline made her movie debut in Red Ball Express, which features Jeff Chandler and Alex Nicol. The uniqueness of her debut had to do with the camera shot, which showed the 20-year-old's derrière rather than the usual facial closeup. Jacqueline is shown pedaling away on a French bicycle in the opening shot of the Universal International feature. The irony is that the young actress was under contract to MGM for the previous two years. During this time, more than 3,000 feet of tests were made of her facial expressions.

== Partial filmography ==
- Nero (1922)
- Monsieur Beaucaire (1924)
- He Who Gets Slapped (1924)
- My Husband's Wives (1924)
- The Lady (1925)
- Cheaper to Marry (1925)
- Man and Maid (1925)
- Time, the Comedian (1925)
- The Sporting Life (1925)
- The Skyrocket (1926)
- The Exquisite Sinner (1926)
- Beverly of Graustark (1926)
- Blarney (1926)
- Twelve Miles Out (1927)
- The Magic Garden (1927)
- Beware of Widows (1927)
- Alias the Lone Wolf (1927)
- Breakfast at Sunrise (1927)
- No Other Woman (1928)
- The Divine Woman (1928)
