= Robert Neilson Stephens =

American writer

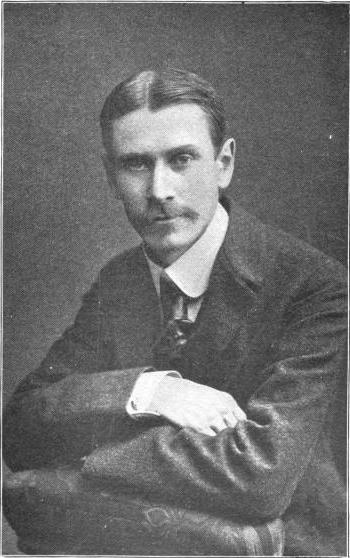
- Stephens circa 1901
- Born: July 22, 1867; New Bloomfield, Pennsylvania, United States
- Died: January 20, 1906 (aged 38); Bournemouth, England
- Occupations: Novelist and playwright
- Spouse: Maude Helfenstein

Robert Neilson Stephens (July 22, 1867 - January 20, 1906) was an American novelist and playwright. An Enemy to the King, both a play and a novel, was one of his best known works. An Enemy to the King was also adapted for the cinema under the same title, An Enemy to the King, in 1916.

Stephens was born in New Bloomfield, Pennsylvania on July 22, 1867, to James Andrew and Rebecca (Neilson) Stephens. His father died when he was 9, and his mother then became a teacher. He graduated from the high school in Huntingdon, Pennsylvania, then going on to employment at a printing office, followed by a book store and railroad office, until he was hired by the Philadelphia Press in December 1886. He was drama editor of that paper until 1893, and by that time had also published short stories in magazines. He subsequently became a theatrical agent in New York City and began writing plays. His first play, On the Bowery, featured famous bridge jumper Steve Brodie. On the Bowery and his other early plays were intended for popular consumption, not critical acclaim, in the hope he could produce more serious pieces in the future.

Stephens married Maude Helfenstein in 1889. Long in ill health, Stephens went to England in 1899, and died in Bournemouth, England, on January 20, 1906.

== Bibliography ==
=== Plays ===
- On the Bowery (1894) (concerning bridge jumper Steve Brodie)
- The White Rat (1895)
- The Alderman (1895)
- A Girl Wanted (1896)
- An Enemy to the King (1896) (also published in book form in 1897) (E. H. Sothern and Virginia Harned had leading roles in the play)
- The Ragged Regiment (1898)
- Miss Elizabeth's Prisoner (1903) (with E. Lyall Swete), a Revolutionary War drama with William Faversham in a leading role.

=== Books ===
- The Life and Adventures of Steve Brodie (1894)
- An Enemy to the King (1897)
- The Continental Dragoon (1898)
- The Road to Paris (1898)
- A Gentleman Player (1899)
- Philip Winwood (1900)
- Captain Ravenshaw (1901)
- The Mystery of Murray Davenport (1903)
- The Bright Face of Danger (1904) (sequel to An Enemy to the King)
- The Flight of Georgiana (1905)
- Clementina's Highwayman (with George Hembert Westley) (1907)
- Tales from Bohemia (1908) (collection of previously written short stories)
- A Soldier of Valley Forge (with G.E. Theodore Roberts) (1911)
- The Sword of Bussy (with Herman Nickerson) (1912)
