= The Lady (1925 film) =

1925 film

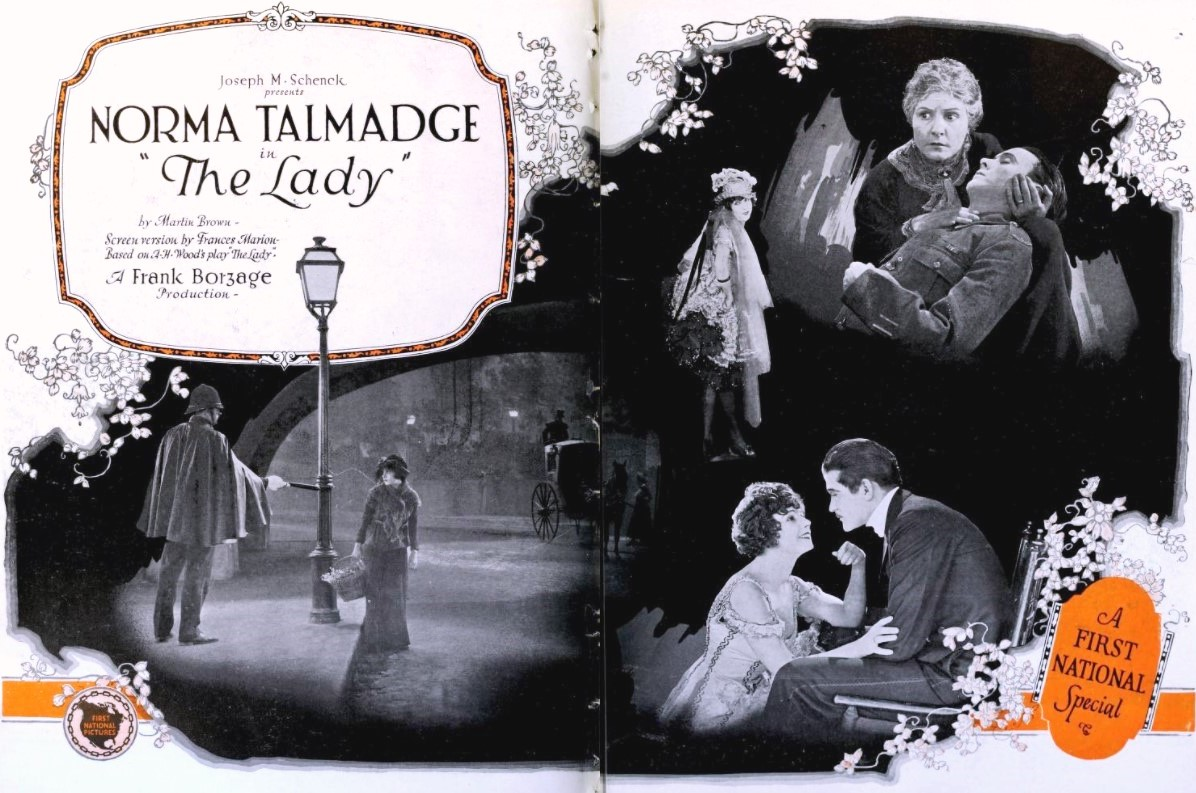
- Trade advertisement
- Directed by: Frank Borzage
- Written by: Frances Marion (scenario)
- Based on: The Lady by Martin Brown
- Produced by: Norma Talmadge; Joseph Schenck
- Starring: Norma Talmadge; Wallace MacDonald
- Cinematography: Tony Gaudio
- Distributed by: First National Pictures
- Release dates: January 25, 1925 (New York City); February 8, 1925 (U.S.)
- Running time: 8 reels; 7,357 feet
- Country: United States
- Language: Silent (English intertitles)

The Lady is a 1925 American silent drama film starring Norma Talmadge and directed by Frank Borzage. Talmadge's own production company produced the film with distribution by First National Pictures.

== Plot ==
As described in a review in a film magazine, Polly Pearl (Talmadge) English hall singer, marries Leonard St. Aubyns (MacDonald), scion of nobility. Leonard loses what little money he has left gambling in casinos. She comes to lose his love when his father (Hurst) casts him out. She ekes out a living in a dingy French cafe as a singer. The elder St. Aubyns appears to claim her baby son after the death of its father, but Polly manages to have the child spirited away by a minister's wife. Thereafter, she endeavors to find her boy, searching the streets of London, but fails. Years later, as she is telling the story of her life in a French cafe, a brawl starts between a Frenchman and an English soldier. Leonard Cairns (Hackathorne), a comrade of the Englishman intervenes but accidentally shoots his friend and is himself knocked unconscious. From his identification tag, Polly discovers that he is her son. She tries to take upon herself the blame for the accident, but her son will not have it that way. To her delight he shows himself to be a gentleman, a joy added to that of her discovery of him.

== Cast ==
- Norma Talmadge as Polly Pearl
- Brandon Hurst as St. Aubyns Sr
- Wallace MacDonald as Leonard St. Aubyns
- Paulette Duval as Madame Adrienne Catellier
- Emily Fitzroy as Madame Blanche
- Johnny Fox (billed as John Fox Jr.) as Freckles
- Alfred Goulding as Tom Robinson
- George Hackathorne as Leonard Cairns
- John Herdman as John Cairns
- Ed Hubbell (billed as Edwin Hubbell) as London Boy
- Doris Lloyd as Fannie St. Clair
- Walter Long as Blackie
- Miles McCarthy as Mr. Graves
- Marc McDermott as Mr. Wendover
- Margaret Seddon as Mrs. Cairns

== Production ==
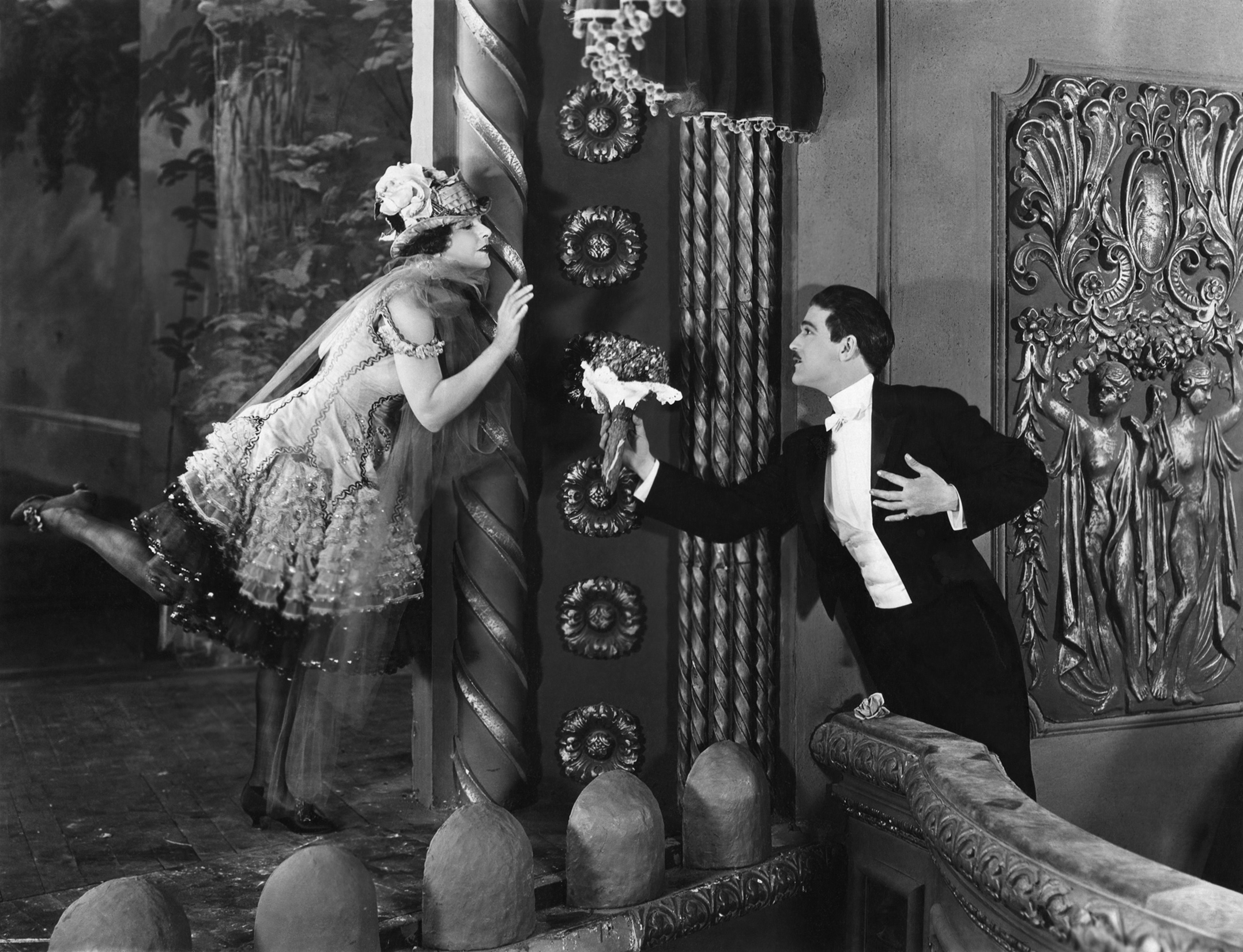
Still with Norma Talmadge and Wallace MacDonald

Like many of Talmadge's silent films of the 1920s, The Lady is derived from a stage play. The play, The Lady, ran on Broadway from December 4, 1923, to February 1924 at Charles Frohman's Empire Theatre. The play was produced by A. H. Woods. Mary Nash played Talmadge's part of Polly Pearl and Elizabeth Risdon played Fanny Le Clare which, in the film, was played by Doris Lloyd. Also in the cast was child actor Junior Durkin who was soon to find bigger fame in films.

The Motion Picture Producers and Distributors of America, formed by the film industry in 1922, regulated the content of films through a list of subjects that were to be avoided. While Norma Talmadge portrayed a prostitute in The Lady, this was acceptable under the rules as prostitution was not explicitly barred so long as it was not forced (i.e., white slavery) and aspects of her work was not shown in the film. While staying at the brothel, her work is stated as being limited to being a cabaret singer.

== Preservation ==
The Lady is preserved in the U.S. Library of Congress with reel 2 missing. The remaining elements of the film were reported to have severe beginning stages of nitrate decomposition making much of the film hard to follow. The film received a full restoration by the Library of Congress in 2022. The restoration is currently distributed by the library as a DCP package.

In 2025, it was selected for preservation in the United States National Film Registry as being "culturally, historically or aesthetically significant."
