= Joseph Walker (cinematographer) =

American cinematographer (1892–1985)

- Born: Joseph Bailey Walker; August 22, 1892; Denver, Colorado, United States
- Died: August 1, 1985 (aged 92); Las Vegas, Nevada, United States
- Occupation: cinematographer
- Years active: 1919 to 1952
- Spouse: Marjorie Warfield 1923 to 1935 Juanita Walker ?-?

Joseph Walker, A.S.C. (August 22, 1892 – August 1, 1985) was an American cinematographer who worked on 145 films during a career that spanned 33 years.

== Early life ==
Born Joseph Bailey Walker in Denver, Colorado.

== Career ==
Walker worked as a wireless telephone engineer, inventor, and photographer of documentaries for the Red Cross during World War I before starting his feature film career in 1919 with the Canadian film Back to God's Country, which was filmed near the Arctic Circle. For the next seven years, he freelanced at various studios, working for noted directors W.S. Van Dyke, Francis Ford, George B. Seitz, and others. He joined Columbia Pictures in 1927 and worked almost exclusively at the studio until he retired in 1952.

Walker collaborated with director Frank Capra on 20 films, including Ladies of Leisure (1930), Lady for a Day (1933), The Bitter Tea of General Yen (1933), It Happened One Night (1934), Lost Horizon (1937), Mr. Deeds Goes to Town (1936), You Can't Take It with You (1938), Mr. Smith Goes to Washington (1939), and It's a Wonderful Life (1946).

In addition to his film work, Walker held 20 patents on various camera-related inventions he devised, including the Double Exposure System, several zoom lenses, the Duomar Lens for both motion picture and television cameras, the Variable Diffusion Device, the Facial Make-Up Meter, lightweight camera blimps, and optical diffusion techniques. In 1994 many of Walker's inventions, lenses, devices and patents were purchased by ASC Museum Curator Steve Gainer, ASC ASK and are on display at the ASC clubhouse in Hollywood.

Walker was nominated for the Academy Award for Best Cinematography four times. He was the first recipient of the Gordon E. Sawyer Award, presented to him in recognition of his technological contributions to the film industry by the Academy of Motion Picture Arts and Sciences in 1982.

== Personal life ==
Walker collaborated on his 1984 autobiography The Light on Her Face, with his second wife Juanita Walker.

== Death ==
He died in Las Vegas, Nevada.

== Partial filmography ==
- Back to God's Country (1919)
- The Grub-Stake (1923)
- Richard the Lion-Hearted (1923)
- What Shall I Do? (1924)
- The Clash of the Wolves (1925)
- The Girl on the Stairs (1925)
- North Star (1925)
- Let Women Alone (1925)
- Tentacles of the North (1926)
- The Baited Trap (1926)
- The Flying U Ranch (1927)
- Stage Kisses (1927)
- Fire and Steel (1927)
- Shanghaied (1927)
- The Fighting Stallion (1927)
- Say It with Sables (1928)
- Submarine (1928)
- That Certain Thing (1928)
- Restless Youth (1928)
- Virgin Lips (1928)
- Modern Mothers (1928)
- Object: Alimony (1928)
- The Broadway Hoofer (1929)
- Flight (1929)
- Around the Corner (1930)
- Ladies of Leisure (1930)
- Dirigible (1931)
- The Final Edition (1932)
- American Madness (1932)
- It Happened One Night (1934)
- The Girl Friend (1935)
- Let's Live Tonight (1935)
- Eight Bells (1935)
- The Music Goes 'Round (1936)
- Mr. Deeds Goes to Town (1936)
- Theodora Goes Wild (1936)
- Lost Horizon (1937)
- The Awful Truth (1937)
- You Can't Take It with You (1938) (Academy Award nomination)
- There's That Woman Again (1938)
- Only Angels Have Wings (1939)
- His Girl Friday (1940)
- He Stayed for Breakfast (1940)
- Penny Serenade (1941)
- Here Comes Mr. Jordan (1941) (Academy Award nomination)
- Bedtime Story (1941)
- They All Kissed the Bride (1942)
- Tales of Manhattan (1942)
- My Sister Eileen (1942)
- First Comes Courage (1943)
- A Night to Remember (1943)
- Tars and Spars (1946)
- It's a Wonderful Life (1946)
- The Jolson Story (1946) (Academy Award nomination)
- The Guilt of Janet Ames (1947)
- The Velvet Touch (1948)
- Harriet Craig (1950)
- Born Yesterday (1950)
- Affair in Trinidad (1952)
