= Submarine (1928 film) =

1928 film

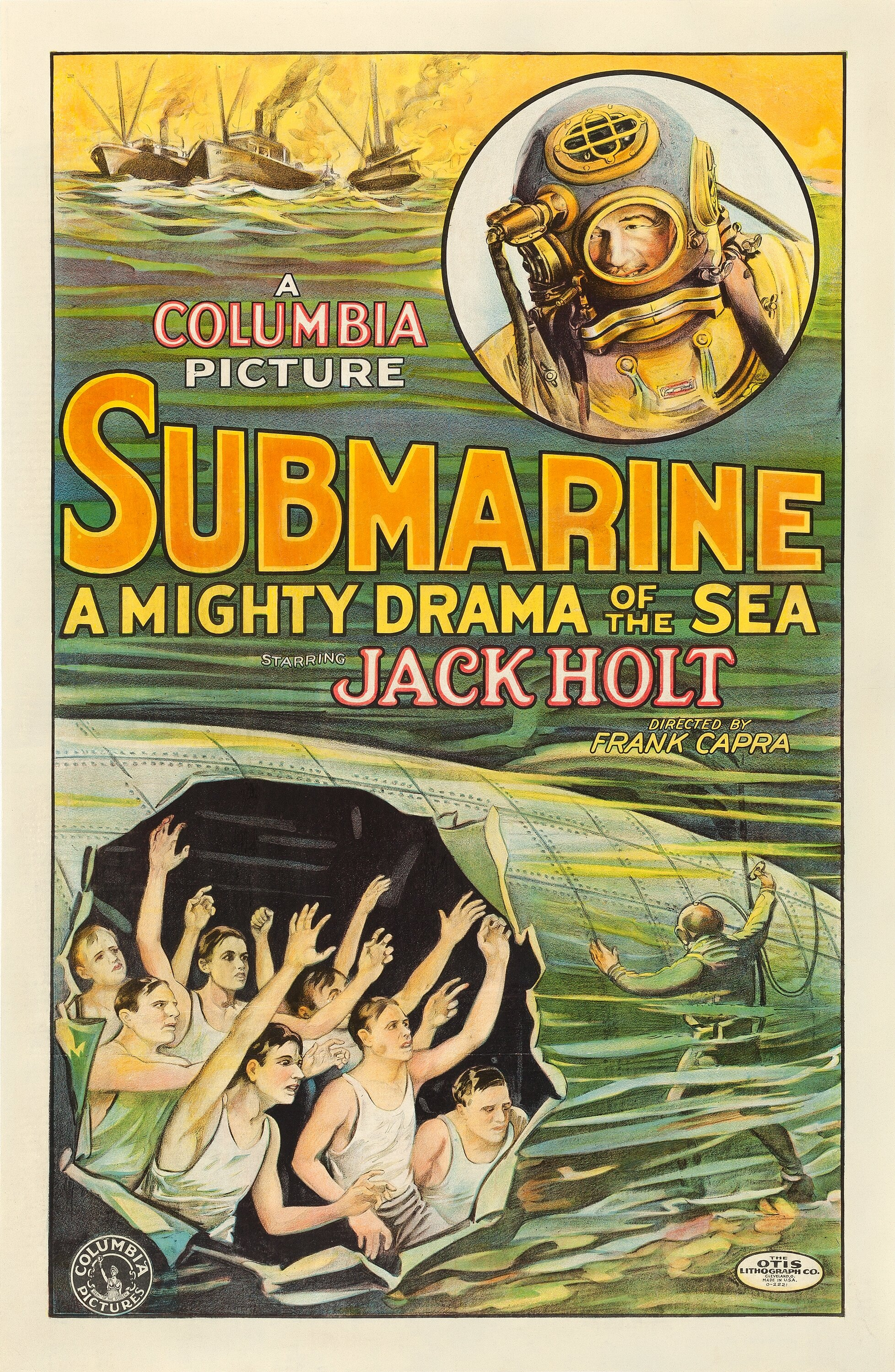
- Directed by: Frank Capra
- Written by: Norman Springer (story); Dorothy Howell
- Produced by: Harry Cohn
- Starring: Jack Holt; Ralph Graves; Dorothy Revier
- Cinematography: Joseph Walker
- Edited by: Arthur Roberts
- Music by: David Broekman
- Production company: Columbia Pictures
- Distributed by: Columbia Pictures
- Release date: August 28, 1928
- Running time: 93 minutes
- Country: United States
- Languages: Sound (Synchronized); English intertitles
- Budget: $150,000

Submarine is a 1928 American synchronized sound drama film directed by Frank Capra. While the film has no audible dialog, it was released with a synchronized musical score with sound effects using the sound-on-film Western Electric Sound System process. This was Columbia's second sound feature following the success of The Scarlet Lady. The film was produced by Harry Cohn. This was Capra's first attempt to make an "A-picture".

== Plot ==
Submarine (1928)

Petty officers Jack Dorgan and Bob Mason are close pals in the U.S. Navy, stationed at a foreign port in China, working hazardous harbor dredging duty. Their days are filled with peril, their nights with jazz, whiskey, and flirtations with local girls. One such night ends in a brawl, but the two emerge victorious—and with female companionship in tow.

Jack, a skilled deep-sea diver, faces death during an underwater demolition job when he becomes tangled in a rope tethered to a live bomb. Bob, risking his own life, dives in to save him, freeing Jack just before the explosive detonates. The two escape with seconds to spare—bonded more than ever by their shared brush with death.

Soon after, Bob is transferred to submarine duty while Jack is sent to San Diego. Lonely and restless, Jack drifts into a dance hall where he meets Bessie, a vivacious jazz-age siren. Smitten by her charm and lured by the intoxicating American nightlife, he marries her on impulse. But domestic bliss quickly sours.

Jack yearns for quiet married life; Bessie, for the dance halls and thrill of nightlife. While Jack is away on a salvage mission, Bessie returns to her old ways. That same night, Bob arrives with a sub squadron and wanders into the same dance hall—where he unknowingly meets Bessie. Believing she's single, he falls hard. The two embark on a whirlwind affair.

When Jack returns, he is eager to introduce Bob to his “perfect wife.” Bob is stunned to learn the truth—Bessie is Jack's wife. Jack remains clueless as he leaves Bob alone with her. Bessie confesses her love for Bob and embraces him just as Jack returns unexpectedly. Misreading the situation, Jack believes his best friend has betrayed him and throws Bob out.

Devastated, Jack retreats into silence and bitterness.

When Bob's submarine later sinks in a deep-sea accident, all attempts to reach the trapped crew fail due to the crushing pressure. Only one diver in the Navy can withstand the descent—Jack Dorgan.

Bessie, frantic upon hearing the news, rushes to Jack to beg him to save Bob. At first unresponsive, Jack jolts back to life when Bessie confesses her affair. Overcome with remorse and guilt, he races to the crash site, suits up, and descends into the abyss.

Inside the submarine, the crew is losing hope. Compartments flood, air thins, death seems imminent. Jack taps a Morse code message on the hull, asking if Bob is alive. Fearing Jack may not rescue him, Bob urges the captain to say he is dead—then attempts suicide to make the lie true. His shipmates stop him just in time, and the captain replies truthfully: All are alive.

Jack goes to work. The oxygen lines are connected. The crew is saved.

Months later, in a foreign port, Jack and Bob once again walk side by side, their bond stronger than betrayal, singing heartily and ready for the next adventure. Far away, Bessie—older, a little harder—is back in the dance hall, smiling flirtatiously at a new sailor.

== Cast ==
- Jack Holt as Jack Dorgan
- Dorothy Revier as Bessie, Mrs. Jack Dorgan
- Ralph Graves as Bob Mason
- Clarence Burton as Submarine Commander
- Arthur Rankin as The Boy

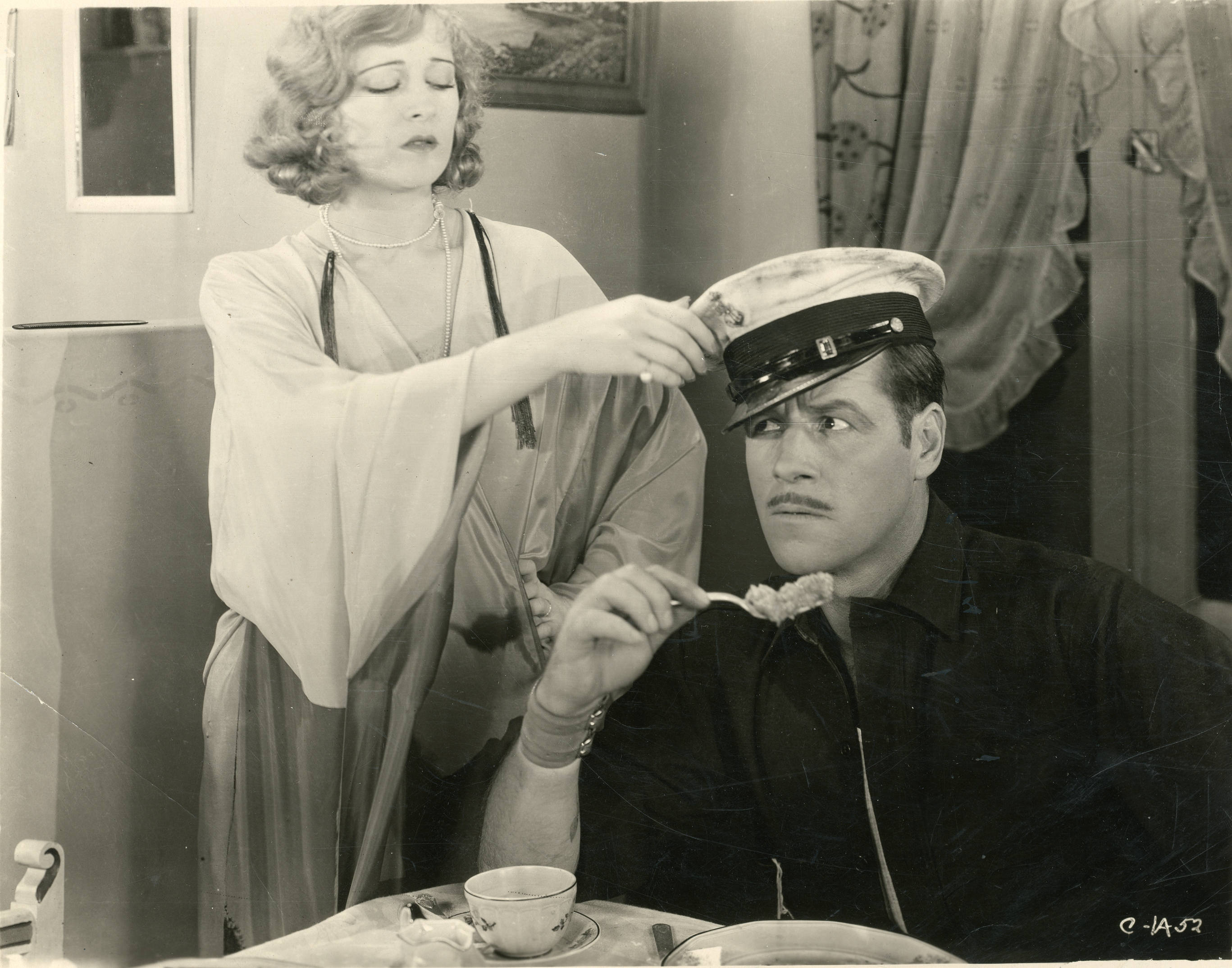
Revier and Jack Holt

== Music ==
The film featured a theme song entitled "Pals, Just Pals" which was composed by Dave Dreyer and Herman Ruby.

== Preservation ==
Complete copies of the film are held at the Library of Congress, the Filmmuseum, and the Cineteca Nazionale.

== See also ==
- List of early sound feature films (1926–1929)
