= Greater Victoria Film Commission =

Vancouver Island South Film and Media Commission
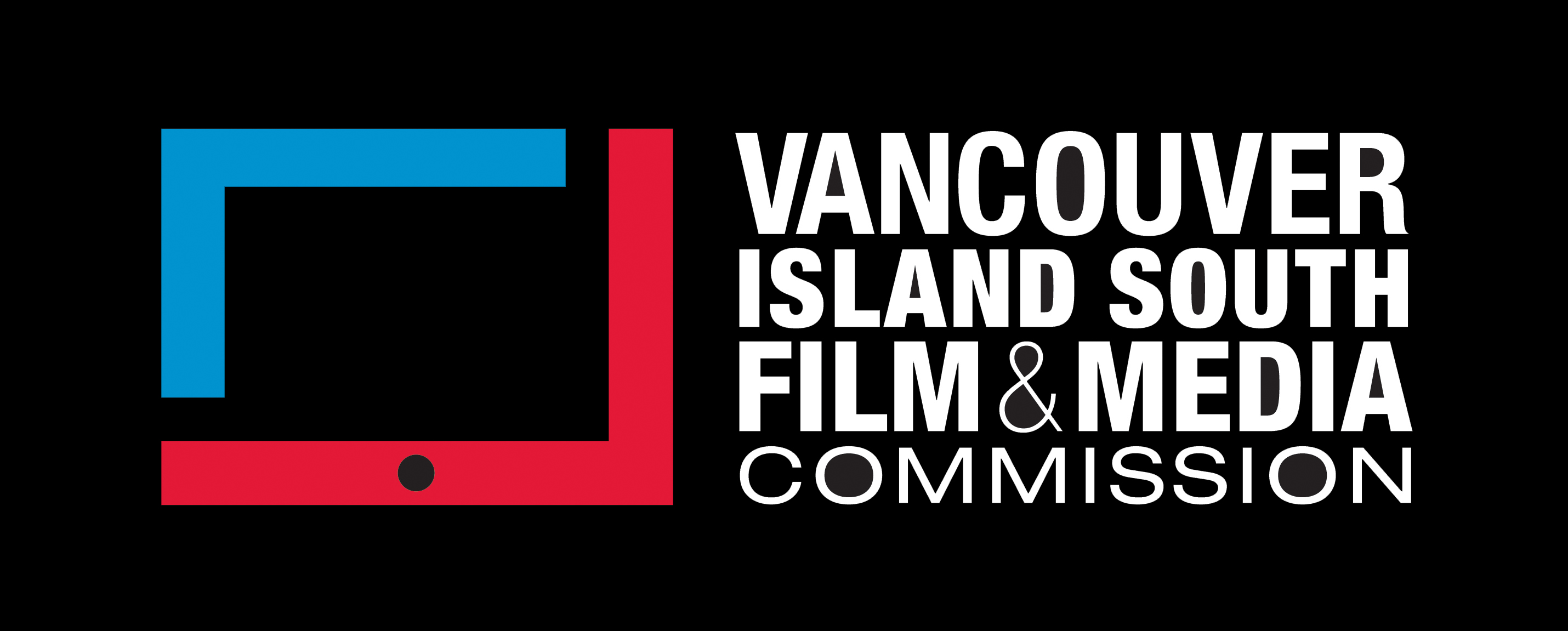
- Founded: 1996
- Type: Non-Profit Organization
- Purpose: Economic Development - Market and promote the locations, skills and creativity inherent in Victoria and Vancouver Island to the global film industry.
- Location: City of Victoria
- Region served: Southern Vancouver Island, British Columbia, Canada
- Members: 343
- Film Commissioner: Kathleen Gilbert
- Website: www.filmvictoria.com

The Vancouver Island South Film and Media Commission (VISFMC) was established as a non-profit organization in 1996 with the objective to promote the Southern Vancouver Island as an international filming destination.

== Details ==
The Vancouver Island South Film and Media Commission (formerly known as the Greater Victoria Film Commission) was originally a committee of the Greater Victoria Chamber of Commerce until it was spun out into a separate organization.

The Vancouver Island South Film and Media Commission receives financial support from Creative BC and the British Columbia Ministry of Community, Sport, and Cultural Development as well as the Southern Vancouver Island municipalities of: City of Victoria, District of Saanich, District of Oak Bay, City of Langford, City of Colwood, Town of Esquimalt, District of Sooke, Town of View Royal, District of Metchosin, District of Port Renfrew and District of Highlands.

As a non-profit the Vancouver Island South Film and Media Commission has focused on developing the infrastructure required to provide necessary services and talent to the international film and television industry. As part of their efforts to increase film productions in the region they provide free services to production companies such as location scouting, location surveys, script breakdowns, digital location library, and assistance with film and work permits. The Vancouver Island-based organization works to attract film and media productions from around the world.

== Films ==
Some films that have shot in the Southern Vancouver Island area include:

- Victoria and Vancouver: Gateways to Canada (1936)
- Secret Patrol (1936)
- Fury and the Woman (1936)
- Woman Against The World (1937)
- Convicted (1938)
- Special Inspector (1938)
- Death Goes North (1939)
- Commandos Strike At Dawn (1942)
- Vixen! (1968)
- Harry In Your Pocket (1973)
- The Changeling (1980)
- Year of the Dragon (1985)
- April Fools Day (1986)
- Hot Pursuit (1987)
- Backfire (1988)
- Bird On A Wire (1990)
- Knight Moves (1992)
- Little Women (1994)
- Intersection (1994)
- Excess Baggage (1997)
- Masterminds (1997)
- Better Than Chocolate (1999)
- Lake Placid (1999)
- Final Destination (2000)
- Scary Movie (2000)
- Cats & Dogs (2001)
- Dead Heat (2002)
- X2 (2003)
- The Core (2003)
- White Chicks (2004)
- I Want to Marry Ryan Banks (2004)
- The Keeper (2004)
- Fierce People (2005)
- X-Men: The Last Stand (2006)
- Looking For Mike (2016)
- In The Land of Women (2006)
- The Mermaid Chair (2006)
- Sorority Wars (2009)
- 2012 (2009)
- Bond of Silence (2010)
- The Boy Who Cried Werewolf (2010)
- Time After Time (2011)
- Magic Beyond Words: The JK Rowling Story (2011)
- Big Time Movie (2012)
- Godzilla (2014)
- Kid Cannabis (2014)
- Mark & Russell's Wild Ride (2015)
- The Boy (2015)
- Pup Star (2015)
- The Girl in the Photographs (2015)
- Disney's Descendants (2015)
- Deadpool (2015)
- Deadpool 2 (2018)
- Brahms: The Boy II (2020)
- Apex (2021)
- The Wedding Veil (2022)
- Rescued By Ruby (2022)
- American Dreamer (2022)

== Television series ==
- Wild Things (1994)
- Poltergeist: The Legacy (1996)
- X-Files (1997)
- Smallville (2001 - 2017) Hatley Castle - Luthor Mansion
- The Dead Zone (2004) S4 E11: Saved
- Spooksville (2013)
- Gracepoint (2014)
- Moosemeat & Marmalade (2015)
- Van Helsing (2016)
- Chesapeake Shores (2016)
- Dateline (2017) S10 E16: The Dream House Mystery
- Murdoch Mysteries (2017) S11 E: Home For The Holidays
- ReBoot: The Guardian Code (2017)
- See (2019)
- Twilight Zone (2020) S2 E2: Downtime
- MAID (2021)
- Big Food Bucket List (2022) S3 E5: Live, Laugh, Lasagna - House of Boateng
- Reginald The Vampire (2022)
- Bones of Crows (2023)
