= Commandos Strike at Dawn =

1942 film by John Farrow

- Directed by: John Farrow
- Written by: C. S. Forester (story); Irwin Shaw
- Produced by: Sam Wood; Buddy G. DeSylva (uncredited)
- Starring: Paul Muni; Anna Lee; Lillian Gish; Sir Cedric Hardwicke; Robert Coote
- Narrated by: Lester Cowan
- Cinematography: William C. Mellor
- Edited by: Anne Bauchens
- Music by: Louis Gruenberg; John Leipold (uncredited)
- Production company: Columbia Pictures
- Distributed by: Columbia Pictures
- Release date: December 30, 1942
- Running time: 100 minutes
- Country: United States
- Language: English
- Box office: $1.5 million (US rentals)

Commandos Strike at Dawn is a 1942 war film directed by John Farrow and written by Irwin Shaw from a short story entitled "The Commandos" by C. S. Forester that appeared in Cosmopolitan magazine in June 1942. Filmed in Canada, it starred Paul Muni, Anna Lee, Lillian Gish in her return to the screen, Cedric Hardwicke and Robert Coote.

== Plot ==
Erik Toresen, a widower and peaceful man, is stirred to violence after the Nazis occupy his quiet Norwegian fishing village. German abuses lead Erik to form a Resistance group. He kills the head of the Nazis occupying his village, and then escapes to Britain, and guides some British Commandos to a raid on a secret airstrip the Germans are building on the Norwegian coast.

== Cast ==
- Paul Muni as Eric Toresen
- Anna Lee as Judith Bowen
- Lillian Gish as Mrs Bergesen
- Cedric Hardwicke as Admiral Bowen
- Ray Collins as Johan Bergesen
- Robert Coote as Robert Bowen
- Rosemary DeCamp as Hilma Arnesen
- Alexander Knox as German Captain
- Elisabeth Fraser as Anna Korstad
- Richard Derr as Gunnar Korstad
- Erville Alderson as Johan Garme
- Barbara Everest as Mrs. Olav
- Rod Cameron as Pastor
- Louis Jean Heydt as Karl Arnesen
- George Macready as Schoolteacher
- Ann Carter as Solveig Toresen (uncredited)
- Arthur Margetson as German Colonel
- Lloyd Bridges as Young German Soldier (uncredited)

== Production ==
Inspired by 1941 commando raids in Norway, Columbia Pictures registered the name "Commandos Story" in 1941 feeling the title could spawn a film.

Director John Farrow was a Commander in the Royal Canadian Naval Volunteer Reserve.

The film was shot in the Greater Victoria, Canada, area. Saanich Inlet stands in for Norwegian fjords. The airstrip is what would become the Victoria International Airport. Hall's Boat House (now Goldstream Marina) is where the wharf scenes are shot. The Canadian Army provided a large number of troops as well as military equipment while the RCAF provided aircraft shown include two Bristol Bolingbrokes and two Westland Lysanders. Canadian soldiers from the Battle Drill Training School in Vernon appeared in the film, Warrant Officer Class I Mickey Miquelon of the Calgary Highlanders and Warrant Officer Class II Lester Kemp. The ship used in the film was HMCS Prince David (F89) a former CN Steamship which had been converted to an Armed Merchant Cruiser in 1940.

During the 1930s, Oak Bay, British Columbia was the original "Hollywood North" when fourteen films were produced in Greater Victoria between 1933 and 1938. An off-season exhibition building on the Willows Fairgrounds was converted to a film soundstage and films were produced with stars such as Lillian Gish, Paul Muni, Sir Cedric Hardwicke, Edith Fellows, Charles Starrett and Rin Tin Tin Jr. The Willows Park Studio films include:

- 1933 The Crimson Paradise (aka Fighting Playboy)
- 1935 Secrets of Chinatown
- 1936 Fury and the Woman (aka Lucky Corrigan)
- 1936 Lucky Fugitives
- 1936 Secret Patrol
- 1936 Stampede
- 1936 Tugboat Princess
- 1937 What Price Vengeance
- 1937 Manhattan Shakedown
- 1937 Murder is News
- 1937 Woman Against the World
- 1937 Death Goes North
- 1938 Convicted
- 1938 Special Inspector
- 1942 Commandos Strike at Dawn (1942)

== Soundtrack ==
The film was nominated for an Academy Award for its score by the world-renowned opera composer, Louis Gruenberg and an uncredited John Leipold. This was Gruenberg's second Hollywood film score and second nomination for one; he'd moved to Beverly Hills in the late 1930s to supplement his income and hang out with fellow LA resident, Arnold Schoenberg, whose works Gruenberg had championed when these composers could still live in Europe and not Los Angeles County.

Ann Ronell fashioned a song Out to Pick the Berries from Gruenberg's score and wrote lyrics for a theme which became known as The Commandos March.

Igor Stravinsky, who had been approached to score the film, completed his score before the film had been finished and negotiations to make revisions fell through. Stravinsky recycled the music he had prepared for the film into his Four Norwegian Moods.

== Release ==
The film was meant to be released in 1943, but it was released early due to the failure of the Dieppe Raid.

After the film's London premiere in 1943, Columbia Pictures donated the proceeds from the premiere to the King Haakon Norwegian Relief Fund at a lunch attended by Prime Minister Johan Nygaardsvold, head of the Norwegian government-in-exile in London.

== See also ==
- Lillian Gish filmography
- British Commandos in Norway

== Works cited ==
- Gasher, Mike (2002). Hollywood North: The Feature Film Industry in British Columbia. University of British Columbia Press. ISBN 978-0774809689.
