= Al Clark (film editor) =

American film editor (1902–1971)

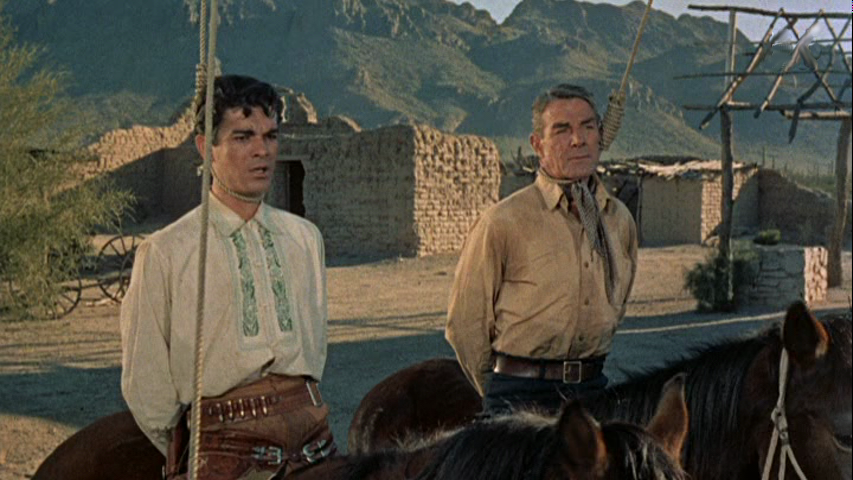
- Manuel Rojas and Randolph Scott in Buchanan Rides Alone
- Born: September 15, 1902; Illinois, U.S.
- Died: July 13, 1971 (aged 68); Los Angeles, California, U.S.
- Occupation: Film editor
- Years active: 1933–1969
- Spouse: Hazel Clark
- Children: George Clark

Al Clark (September 15, 1902 – July 13, 1971) was a prolific American film editor whose career spanned four decades, most of which was spent at Columbia Pictures. He was nominated for 5 Academy Awards and 1 Emmy during his career. He is credited with editing over 120 films, and towards the end of his career, in the 1960s, he also edited several television series.

== Career ==
Clark began his career in 1933 at the Poverty Row studio, Tower Productions. The first film he worked on was the crime drama, The Important Witness. In 1934 he would begin his long association with Columbia Pictures, on Lambert Hillyer's crime drama, Men of the Night. His work on the 1937 screwball comedy, The Awful Truth, starring Irene Dunne and Cary Grant, earned him the first of his five Academy Award for Best Film Editing nominations. In 1939 Clark co-edited, along with Gene Havlick, Frank Capra's classic Mr. Smith Goes to Washington, which stars Jean Arthur and James Stewart. The two editors were nominated for an Academy Award, losing to the editors for Gone With the Wind. His third nomination came in 1940 for the classic political drama, All the King's Men, shared with Robert Parrish. The winner that year was Harry W. Gerstad for Champion. In 1958, he and William A. Lyon edited the western Cowboy, starring Glenn Ford and Jack Lemmon. However, the editing award that year went to Adrienne Fazan for Gigi. Clark's fifth and final Oscar nomination came in 1961, for his work on Pepe, which he co-edited by Viola Lawrence. That year the Oscar went to Daniel Mandell for The Apartment. His long association with Columbia came to an end in 1962, with Clark's work on The Interns. After his departure from Columbia, Clark edited only two more films: the 1963 comedy Hootenanny Hoot, for MGM; and the 1969 Elvis Presley western, Charro!.

Beginning in 1952 on NBC's Cavalcade of America, Clark worked sporadically on television shows. His television credits include Dennis the Menace (1959), The Twilight Zone (1963), Gilligan's Island (1964), Perry Mason (1963–65), and I Dream of Jeannie (1965). His final work in television was from 1967 to 1968 on The High Chaparral. His work on Ben Casey garnered him an Emmy Award nomination in 1963.

== Filmography ==
(Per AFI database)

Editor
Year	Film	Director	Notes	Other notes
1933	The Important Witness	Sam Newfield	First collaboration with Sam Newfield	
1933	Big Time or Bust	Sam Newfield	Second collaboration with Sam Newfield	
1934	Men of the Night	Lambert Hillyer	First collaboration with Lambert Hillyer	
1935	Square Shooter	David Selman	First collaboration with David Selman	
1935	The Revenge Rider	David Selman	Second collaboration with David Selman	
1935	Fighting Shadows	David Selman	Third collaboration with David Selman	
1935	Justice of the Range	David Selman	Fourth collaboration with David Selman	
1935	Riding Wild	David Selman	Fifth collaboration with David Selman	
1935	The Case of the Missing Man	D. Ross Lederman	First collaboration with D. Ross Lederman	
1935	Guard That Girl	Lambert Hillyer	Second collaboration with Lambert Hillyer	
1935	Gallant Defender	David Selman	Sixth collaboration with David Selman	
1936	Dangerous Intrigue	David Selman	Seventh collaboration with David Selman	
1936	Ticket to Paradise	Aubrey Scotto		
1936	Blackmailer	Gordon Wiles		
1936	End of the Trail	Erle C. Kenton	First collaboration with Erle C. Kenton	
1936	Legion of Terror	Charles C. Coleman	First collaboration with Charles C. Coleman	
1936	More Than a Secretary	Alfred E. Green	First collaboration with Alfred E. Green	
1937	Let's Get Married	Alfred E. Green	Second collaboration with Alfred E. Green	
1937	The Devil Is Driving	Harry Lachman	First collaboration with Harry Lachman	
1937	It Happened in Hollywood	Harry Lachman	Second collaboration with Harry Lachman	
1937	The Awful Truth	Leo McCarey		
1938	When G-Men Step In	Charles C. Coleman	Second collaboration with Charles C. Coleman	
1938	Holiday	George Cukor		
1938	The Main Event	Danny Dare		
1938	Squadron of Honor	Charles C. Coleman	Third collaboration with Charles C. Coleman	
1938	The Lady Objects	Erle C. Kenton	Second collaboration with Erle C. Kenton	
1938	The Little Adventuress	D. Ross Lederman	Second collaboration with D. Ross Lederman	
1939	North of Shanghai	D. Ross Lederman	Third collaboration with D. Ross Lederman	
1939	Let Us Live	John Brahm	First collaboration with John Brahm	
1939	Good Girls Go to Paris	Alexander Hall		
1939	Mr. Smith Goes to Washington	Frank Capra		
1940	Cafe Hostess	Sidney Salkow	First collaboration with Sidney Salkow	
1940	The Lone Wolf Strikes	Sidney Salkow	Second collaboration with Sidney Salkow	
1940	The Man with Nine Lives	Nick Grinde		
1940	Escape to Glory	John Brahm	Second collaboration with John Brahm	
1940	The Lone Wolf Meets a Lady	Sidney Salkow	Third collaboration with Sidney Salkow	
1940	The Lady in Question	Charles Vidor	First collaboration with Charles Vidor	
1940	Prairie Schooners	Sam Nelson		
1941	The Devil Commands	Edward Dmytryk		
1941	They Dare Not Love	James Whale		
1941	The Richest Man in Town	Charles Barton	First collaboration with Charles Barton	
1941	Ladies in Retirement	Charles Vidor	Second collaboration with Charles Vidor	
1942	The Adventures of Martin Eden	Sidney Salkow	Fourth collaboration with Sidney Salkow	
1942	Meet the Stewarts	Alfred E. Green	Third collaboration with Alfred E. Green	
1942	Blondie for Victory	Frank R. Strayer	First collaboration with Frank R. Strayer	
1942	Daring Young Man	Frank R. Strayer	Second collaboration with Frank R. Strayer	
1943	City Without Men	Sidney Salkow	Fifth collaboration with Sidney Salkow	
1943	She Has What It Takes	Charles Barton	Second collaboration with Charles Barton	
1943	It's a Great Life	Frank R. Strayer	Third collaboration with Frank R. Strayer	
1943	Appointment in Berlin	Alfred E. Green	Fourth collaboration with Alfred E. Green	
1943	What a Woman!	Irving Cummings	First collaboration with Irving Cummings	
1944	Address Unknown	William Cameron Menzies		
1944	The Impatient Years	Irving Cummings	Second collaboration with Irving Cummings	
1944	One Mysterious Night	Budd Boetticher	First collaboration with Budd Boetticher	
1944	Sergeant Mike	Henry Levin	First collaboration with Henry Levin	
1944	She's a Sweetheart	Del Lord		
1945	Leave It to Blondie	Abby Berlin	First collaboration with Abby Berlin	
1945	Counter-Attack	Zoltan Korda		
1945	The Gay Senorita	Arthur Dreifuss		
1945	The Girl of the Limberlost	Mel Ferrer		
1946	Tars and Spars	Alfred E. Green	Fifth collaboration with Alfred E. Green	
1946	Gunning for Vengeance	Ray Nazarro	First collaboration with Ray Nazarro	
1946	The Phantom Thief	D. Ross Lederman	Fourth collaboration with D. Ross Lederman	
1946	Gallant Journey	William A. Wellman		
1947	Johnny O'Clock	Robert Rossen	First collaboration with Robert Rossen	
1947	Her Husband's Affairs	S. Sylvan Simon	First collaboration with S. Sylvan Simon	
1947	Blondie's Anniversary	Abby Berlin	Second collaboration with Abby Berlin	
1948	The Swordsman	Joseph H. Lewis	First collaboration with Joseph H. Lewis	
1948	I Love Trouble	S. Sylvan Simon	Second collaboration with S. Sylvan Simon	
1948	The Fuller Brush Man	S. Sylvan Simon	Third collaboration with S. Sylvan Simon	
1948	Blondie's Reward	Abby Berlin	Third collaboration with Abby Berlin	
1949	Slightly French	Douglas Sirk	First collaboration with Douglas Sirk	
1949	The Undercover Man	Joseph H. Lewis	Second collaboration with Joseph H. Lewis	
1949	We Were Strangers	John Huston		
1949	All the King's Men	Robert Rossen	Second collaboration with Robert Rossen	
1950	Convicted	Henry Levin	Second collaboration with Henry Levin	
1950	The Petty Girl	Henry Levin	Third collaboration with Henry Levin	
1950	Emergency Wedding	Edward Buzzell		
1951	Smuggler's Gold	William Berke		
1951	Lorna Doone	Phil Karlson	First collaboration with Phil Karlson	
1951	The Texas Rangers	Phil Karlson	Second collaboration with Phil Karlson	
1951	Never Trust a Gambler	Ralph Murphy		
1951	The Family Secret	Henry Levin	Fourth collaboration with Henry Levin	
1952	Boots Malone	William Dieterle		
1953	Last of the Comanches	André de Toth	First collaboration with André de Toth	
1953	The 5,000 Fingers of Dr. T.	Roy Rowland		
1953	Conquest of Cochise	William Castle	First collaboration with William Castle	
1953	The Nebraskan	Fred F. Sears	First collaboration with Fred F. Sears	
1953	Bad for Each Other	Irving Rapper		
1953	The Wild One	László Benedek		
1954	Tanganyika	André de Toth	Second collaboration with André de Toth	
1954	Naked Alibi	Jerry Hopper		
1954	Sign of the Pagan	Douglas Sirk	Second collaboration with Douglas Sirk	
1955	New Orleans Uncensored	William Castle	Second collaboration with William Castle	
1955	Chief Crazy Horse	George Sherman		
1955	Bring Your Smile Along	Blake Edwards		
1955	The Gun That Won the West	William Castle	Third collaboration with William Castle	
1955	The Last Frontier	Anthony Mann		
1956	Jubal	Delmer Daves	First collaboration with Delmer Daves	
1956	Miami Exposé	Fred F. Sears	Second collaboration with Fred F. Sears	
1956	You Can't Run Away from It	Dick Powell		
1957	The Tall T	Budd Boetticher	Second collaboration with Budd Boetticher	
1957	The Guns of Fort Petticoat	George Marshall		
1957	The Night the World Exploded	Fred F. Sears	Third collaboration with Fred F. Sears	Uncredited
1957	3:10 to Yuma	Delmer Daves	Second collaboration with Delmer Daves	
1957	Decision at Sundown	Budd Boetticher	Third collaboration with Budd Boetticher	
1958	Cowboy	Delmer Daves	Third collaboration with Delmer Daves	
1958	The Lineup	Don Siegel		
1958	Buchanan Rides Alone	Budd Boetticher	Fourth collaboration with Budd Boetticher	
1958	Apache Territory	Ray Nazarro	Second collaboration with Ray Nazarro	
1958	Senior Prom	David Lowell Rich	First collaboration with David Lowell Rich	
1959	Gunmen from Laredo	Wallace MacDonald		
1959	Hey Boy! Hey Girl!	David Lowell Rich	Second collaboration with David Lowell Rich	
1959	The 30 Foot Bride of Candy Rock	Sidney Miller		
1960	Man on a String	André de Toth	Third collaboration with André de Toth	
1960	All the Young Men	Hall Bartlett		
1960	Pepe	George Sidney		
1962	13 West Street	Philip Leacock		
1962	The Underwater City	Frank McDonald		
1962	The Interns	David Swift		
1963	Hootenanny Hoot	Gene Nelson		
1969	Charro!	Charles Marquis Warren		

Shorts

Editor
Year	Film	Director
1933	How to Break 90 #1: The Grip	George Marshall
1933	How to Break 90 #3: Hip Action	George Marshall
1933	How to Break 90 #5: Impact	George Marshall
1934	It's the Cats	Albert Ray
1934	Counsel on De Fence	Arthur Ripley
1957	Not One Shall Die	David Lowell Rich

TV series

Editor
Year	Title	Notes
1953	Cavalcade of America	1 episode
1955	Damon Runyon Theater	2 episodes
1953−55	Ford Theatre	7 episodes
1958	Shirley Temple's Storybook	1 episode
1959	Goodyear Theatre	2 episodes
1959	Adventure Showcase	1 episode
1959	Dennis the Menace	1 episode
1959−60	Alcoa Theatre	2 episodes
1962−63	Ben Casey	7 episodes
1963	The Twilight Zone	2 episodes
1964	Gilligan's Island	1 episode
1965	The Farmer's Daughter	1 episode
1965	Gidget	1 episode
1965	I Dream of Jeannie	1 episode
1963−65	Perry Mason	16 episodes
1967−68	The High Chaparral	5 episodes
