= Alice Moore =

Alice Moore may refer to:

- Alice Moore Hubbard (1861–1915), American activist
- Dame Alice Moore (1474–c. 1546), wife of Sir Thomas More
- Alice Moore (actress), actress who starred in films such as Woman Against the World
