= North from the Lone Star =

1941 film by Lambert Hillyer

- Theatrical release poster
- Directed by: Lambert Hillyer
- Screenplay by: Charles F. Royal
- Produced by: Leon Barsha
- Starring: Wild Bill Elliott; Richard Fiske; Dorothy Fay; Dub Taylor; Arthur Loft; Jack Roper
- Cinematography: Benjamin H. Kline
- Edited by: Mel Thorsen
- Production company: Columbia Pictures
- Distributed by: Columbia Pictures
- Release date: March 31, 1941
- Running time: 58 minutes
- Country: United States
- Language: English

North from the Lone Star is a 1941 American Western film directed by Lambert Hillyer and written by Charles F. Royal. The film stars Wild Bill Elliott, Richard Fiske, Dorothy Fay, Dub Taylor, Arthur Loft and Jack Roper. The film was released on March 31, 1941, by Columbia Pictures. It is the fifth in Columbia Pictures' series of 12 "Wild Bill Hickok" films, followed by Hands Across the Rockies.

== Cast ==
- Wild Bill Elliott as Wild Bill Hickok
- Richard Fiske as Clint Wilson
- Dorothy Fay as Madge Wilson
- Dub Taylor as Cannonball
- Arthur Loft as 'Flash' Kirby
- Jack Roper as 'Rawhide' Fenton
- Chuck Morrison as Spike
- Claire Rochelle as Lucy Belle
- Al Rhein as Slats
- Edmund Cobb as Dusty Daggett
