= South of the Rio Grande =

South of the Rio Grande may refer to:

- South of the Rio Grande (1945 film), an American western film
- South of the Rio Grande (1932 film), an American Pre-Code western film
