= Law Beyond the Range =

1935 film by Ford Beebe

- Theatrical release poster
- Directed by: Ford Beebe
- Screenplay by: Lambert Hillyer
- Produced by: Harry L. Decker
- Starring: Tim McCoy; Billie Seward; Robert Allen; Guy Usher; Harry Todd; Walter Brennan
- Cinematography: Benjamin H. Kline
- Edited by: Ray Snyder
- Production company: Columbia Pictures
- Distributed by: Columbia Pictures
- Release date: February 15, 1935
- Running time: 60 minutes
- Country: United States
- Language: English

Law Beyond the Range is a 1935 American Western film directed by Ford Beebe and written by Lambert Hillyer. The film stars Tim McCoy, Billie Seward, Robert Allen, Guy Usher, Harry Todd and Walter Brennan. The film was released on February 15, 1935, by Columbia Pictures.

== Plot ==
Tim is expelled from the Rangers after allowing his friend Kane, who has been accused of murder, to flee. Following the death of newspaper editor Alexander, Tim assumes control of the paper in order to continue the campaign against Heston and the sheriff who supports him. At the same time, he seeks to uncover the identity of the leader of a local outlaw gang and to help clear Kane of the charges against him.

== Cast ==
- Tim McCoy as Tim McDonald
- Billie Seward as Gloria Alexander
- Robert Allen as Johnny Kane
- Guy Usher as Daniel Heston
- Harry Todd as Judge Avery
- Walter Brennan as Abner
- Si Jenks as Zeke
- James B. 'Pop' Kenton as Pete
- Ben Hendricks Jr. as Sheriff Burke
- Jules Cowles as Lockjaw Nelson
