= Voice in the Night (film) =

1934 film by Charles C. Coleman

- Directed by: Charles C. Coleman
- Written by: Harold Shumate
- Produced by: Irving Briskin
- Starring: Tim McCoy; Billie Seward; Joseph Crehan
- Cinematography: John Stumar
- Edited by: John Rawlins
- Production company: Columbia Pictures
- Distributed by: Columbia Pictures
- Release date: April 6, 1934
- Running time: 59 minutes
- Country: United States
- Language: English

Voice in the Night is a 1934 American action film directed by Charles C. Coleman and starring Tim McCoy, Billie Seward, and Joseph Crehan. It was produced as a second feature by Columbia Pictures.

== Plot ==
Tim Dale, the son of the president of a telephone company, uncovers a plot by a gang who plan to have a rival telephone company fail so that they can then sell a major contract on at a huge profit to themselves.

== Cast ==
- Tim McCoy as Tim Dale
- Billie Seward as Barbara Robinson
- Joseph Crehan as John Robinson
- Ward Bond as Bob Hall
- Kane Richmond as Jack
- Frank Layton as Matthews
- Guy Usher as Thomas Benton
- Francis McDonald as Henchman Jackson
- Alphonse Ethier as W. T. Dale
- Matthew Betz as Henchman Anderson
- Milton Kibbee as Secretary Allen
