= Men of the Hour =

1935 film

- Directed by: Lambert Hillyer
- Written by: Anthony Coldeway
- Produced by: Harry Cohn
- Starring: Richard Cromwell; Billie Seward; Wallace Ford
- Cinematography: Benjamin H. Kline
- Edited by: John Rawlins
- Production company: Columbia Pictures
- Distributed by: Columbia Pictures
- Release date: May 5, 1935
- Running time: 63 minutes
- Country: United States
- Language: English

Men of the Hour is a 1935 American action drama film directed by Lambert Hillyer and starring Richard Cromwell, Billie Seward and Wallace Ford. It was produced and distributed by Hollywood studio Columbia Pictures.

== Plot ==
Dave and Andy are a team of newsreel cameramen both of whom are in love with Ann, a nurse. Andy has a habit of stealing the credit from the hard-working Dave, leading to the latter breaking up the partnership and going solo. However his efforts to work without Andy are a failure and the two come together again on a particularly dangerous job.

== Cast ==
- Richard Cromwell as Dave Durkin
- Billie Seward as Ann Jordan
- Wallace Ford as Andy Blane
- Jack La Rue as Nick Thomas
- Wesley Barry as Dick Williams
- Charles C. Wilson as Harper
- Ernie Adams as Steve
- Eddie Hart as Bill
- Marc Lawrence as Joe
- Pat O'Malley as Police Captain
- Gene Morgan as Walters
- Stanley Taylor as Long
- Dick Elliott as Theatre Manager
- Allan Cavan as Minister
- Inez Courtney as Miss Allison
- Stanley Blystone as Policeman
- Evelyn Pierce as Secretary

== Bibliography ==
- Fetrow, Alan G. . Sound Films, 1927-1939: a United States Filmography. McFarland, 1992.
- Slide, Anthony. Actors on Red Alert: Career Interviews with Five Actors and Actresses Affected by the Blacklist. Scarecrow Press, 1999.
