= Billie Seward =

American actress (1912–82)

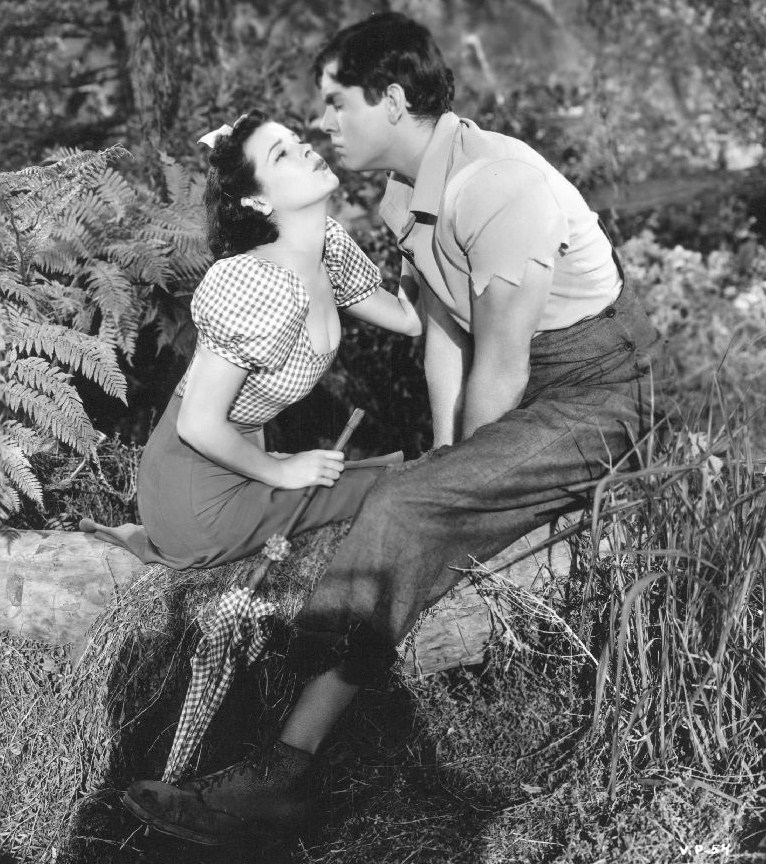
- Billie Seward and Jeff York in Li'l Abner (1940)
- Born: Rita Ann Seward; October 23, 1912; Philadelphia, Pennsylvania, U.S.
- Died: March 20, 1982 (aged 69); Los Angeles, California, U.S.
- Years active: 1934–1944
- Spouse: William Wilkerson (1935-1938)

Billie Seward (born Rita Ann Seward; October 23, 1912 – March 20, 1982) was a 1930s motion picture actress from Philadelphia, Pennsylvania.

== Film actress ==
Seward performed with Lou Holtz at The Beverly Wilshire Hotel Gold Room in December 1933.

She obtained a contract with Columbia Pictures following a three-month stay in Hollywood. Seward starred with Richard Cromwell in the 1934 Columbia production of Among the Missing. Wallace Ford joined Seward and Cromwell in Hot News, which was eventually titled Men of the Hour (1935).

She was in three western films written by Ford Beebe in 1935. The titles are Law Beyond the Range, The Revenge Rider, and Justice of the Range. Colonel Tim McCoy, Ward Bond, and Ed LeSaint were among her fellow actors. In One Crowded Night (1940) Seward plays Gladys. This RKO film is critiqued by Bosley Crowther who called it "a routine multi-plot melodrama, Grand Hotel reduced to a tourist camp."

== Marriage ==
In 1934 Seward was linked romantically to actor Lyle Talbot. She married William Wilkerson, owner of the Trocadero (Los Angeles) and Ciro's, on September 30, 1935. Wilkerson was also the owner and publisher of The Hollywood Reporter. The couple separated in February 1937 but reconciled. Seward renewed a divorce suit against Wilkerson in March 1938, using her legal name Rita Ann Wilkerson.

== Death ==
Seward died in Sherman Oaks, California, in 1982. She was survived by four brothers and two sisters. Her Funeral Mass was celebrated at St. Cyril of Jerusalem Roman Catholic Church in Encino, California, and she was buried in the San Fernando Mission Cemetery.

== Partial filmography ==
- School For Romance (1934, Short) - Mrs. Romansky
- The 9th Guest (1934) - Office Worker (uncredited)
- Once to Every Woman (1934) - No. 5
- Voice In The Night (1934) - Barbara Robinson
- Twentieth Century (1934) - Anita
- The Hell Cat (1934) - Minor Role (uncredited)
- Plumbing For Gold (1934, Short)
- Whom the Gods Destroy (1934) - Jerry's Wife (uncredited)
- Blind Date (1934) - Barbara Hartwell
- Among the Missing (1934) - Judy
- Fugitive Lady (1934) - Miss Hyland
- Law Beyond the Range (1935) - Gloria Alexander
- The Revenge Rider (1935) - Myra Harmon
- Men of the Hour (1935) - Ann Jordan
- Air Hawks (1935) - Mona Greenwood
- Justice of the Range (1935) - Janet McLean
- Riding Wild (1935) - Jane McCabe
- Branded a Coward (1935) - Ethel Carson
- Trails of The Wild (1935) - Jane Madison
- The Man from Guntown (1935) - Ruth McArthur
- Charlie Chan at Treasure Island (1939) - Bessie Sibley
- Reno (1939) - Mrs. Gordon (uncredited)
- One Crowded Night (1940) - Gladys
- Li'l Abner (1940) - Cousin Delightful
- No Hands on the Clock (1941) - Rose Madden
- Jane Eyre (1943) - Woman at Party (uncredited)
- The Gang's All Here (1943) - Dancer (uncredited)
- Take It or Leave It (1944) - Nurse (uncredited)
- Something for the Boys (1944) - Minor Role (uncredited) (final film role)
