= Riding Wild =

1935 film by David Selman

- Theatrical poster for the film
- Directed by: David Selman
- Written by: Ford Beebe
- Produced by: Irving Briskin
- Starring: Tim McCoy; Niles Welch; Billie Seward
- Cinematography: Benjamin Kline
- Edited by: Al Clark
- Production company: Columbia Pictures
- Distributed by: Columbia Pictures
- Release date: June 28, 1935 (US)
- Running time: 57 minutes
- Country: United States
- Language: English

Riding Wild is a 1935 American Western film directed by David Selman, which stars Tim McCoy, Niles Welch, and Billie Seward.

== Cast ==
- Tim McCoy as Tim Malloy/Tex Ravelle
- Billie Seward as Jane McCabe
- Niles Welch as Clay Stevens
- Edward LeSaint as McCabe (as Edward J. LeSaint)
- Richard Alexander as Jim Barker
- Richard Botiller as Jocquin Ortega
- Edmund Cobb as Jones (as Eddie Cobb)
- Jack Rockwell as Rusty
- Bud Osborne as Billings
