= Justice of the Range =

1935 film by David Selman

- Lobby card for the film
- Directed by: David Selman
- Written by: Ford Beebe
- Produced by: Harry Decker
- Starring: Tim McCoy; Billie Seward; Ward Bond
- Cinematography: George Meehan
- Edited by: Al Clark
- Production company: Columbia Pictures
- Release date: May 25, 1935 (US)
- Running time: 58 minutes
- Country: United States
- Language: English

Justice of the Range is a 1935 American Western film directed by David Selman, which stars Tim McCoy, Billie Seward, and Ward Bond.

== Cast ==
- Tim McCoy as Tim Condon
- Billie Seward as Janet McLean
- Ward Bond as Bob Brennan
- Guy Usher as Hadley Graves
- Edward LeSaint as John McLean (as Edward Le Saint)
- Allan Sears as Pinto Carew (as Alan Sears)
- Jack Rockwell as Rawhide
- Jack Rutherford as Lafe Brennan
- George 'Gabby' Hayes as John Coffin known as Pegleg Sanderson (as George F. Hayes)
