= Beau Bandit =

1930 film directed by Lambert Hillyer

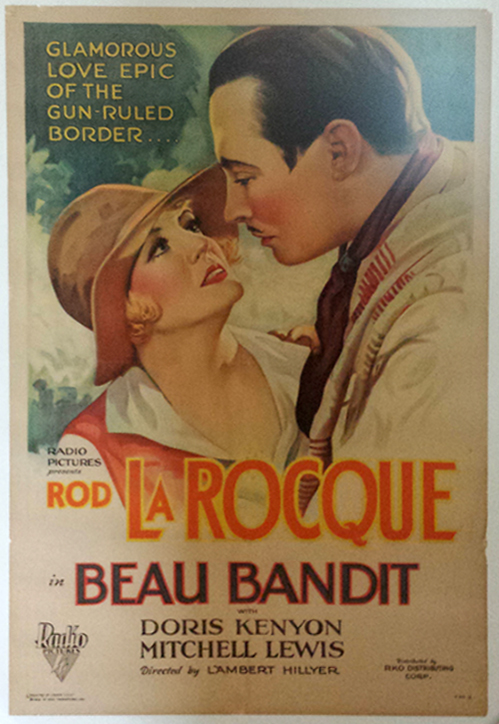
- Theatrical poster for film
- Directed by: Lambert Hillyer
- Screenplay by: Wallace Smith
- Based on: "Strictly Business" by Wallace Smith
- Produced by: William Le Baron
- Starring: Rod La Rocque; Mitchell Lewis; Doris Kenyon; Walter Long
- Cinematography: Jack MacKenzie
- Edited by: Archie F. Marshek
- Production company: RKO Radio Pictures
- Release date: March 2, 1930 (US)
- Running time: 71 minutes
- Country: United States
- Language: English

Beau Bandit is a 1930 American Pre-Code Western film, directed by Lambert Hillyer, from a screenplay by Wallace Smith, based on his short story, "Strictly Business" which appeared in the April 1929 edition of Hearst's International-Cosmopolitan. The film starred Rod La Rocque, Mitchell Lewis, Doris Kenyon, and Walter Long. The story is based loosely on the legend of Robin Hood.

== Plot ==
Beau Bandit (1930)

Montero is a bandit who, along with his deaf-mute sidekick, Coloso, are planning to rob a bank. They are pursued by "Bob Cat" Manners and his posse. As they close in on the bank, owned by Perkins, Montero becomes involved in the personal affairs of Helen Wardell and her fiancé, Howard. Perkins is also interested in Wardell, and holds the mortgage on Howard's ranch. Finding out Montero has a price on his head, Perkins uses that fact to coerce Montero into agreeing to kill Howard. Perkins, however, has no intention of paying Montero, instead arranging for the posse to capture the outlaw.

Montero fakes Howard's murder, and is expecting a double-cross, so he is prepared for the trap, and instead of being captured, he traps the posse. Montero then holds Perkins hostage, extorting $5,000 from him in exchange for his life, and forces Perkins, who is also Justice of the Peace, to marry Helen and Howard. Adding insult to injury, Montero gives the newlyweds the $5,000 for their honeymoon.

== Cast ==
- Rod La Rocque as Montero
- Doris Kenyon as Helen Wardell
- Mitchell Lewis as Coloso
- Walter Long as "Bob Cat" Manners
- Charles Middleton as Perkins
- George Duryea as Howard
- James Donlan as Buck
- Charles Brinley as Slim
- Barney Furey as Logan
- Bill Patton as Texas

== Production ==
The film was originally titled Strictly Business. RKO changed the name to Beau Bandit in January 1930. It included the first depiction in a talking film of a deaf character, Coloso. Although sound films could now depict deaf speech, Coloso was also mute, beginning a time in American cinema of portraying silent deaf persons.

== Reception ==
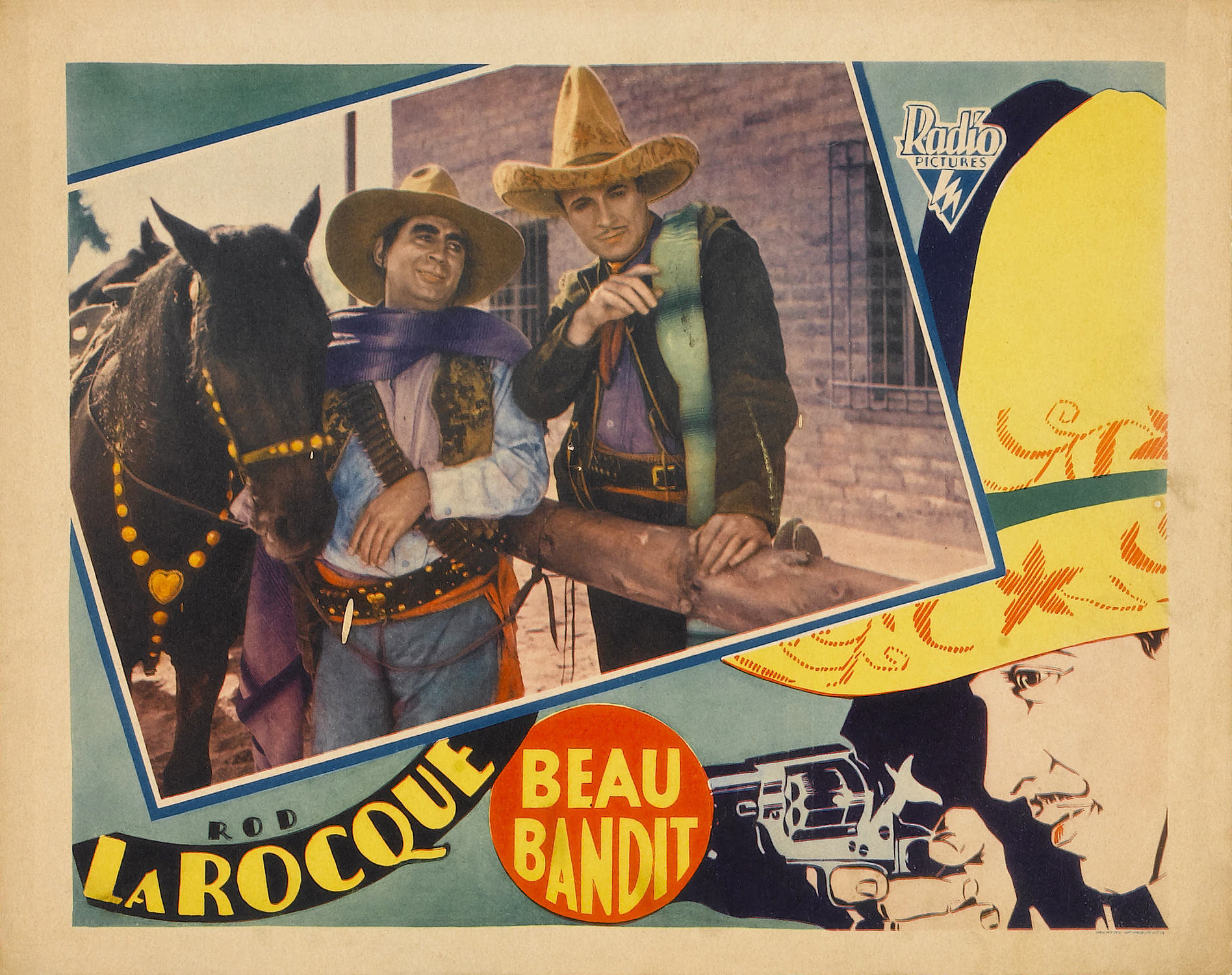
Lobby card for the film.

While being generally favorable to the acting in the film, NY Times critic, Mordaunt Hall, gave the film a mediocre review, laying most of the fault in the screenplay by Smith. Motion Picture magazine gave the film a favorable review, calling it "delightful", and being particularly impressed with the script. Motion Picture News called the film just "so-so", and gave La Rocque's performance a very negative review. However, they complimented Doris Kenyon and Mitchell Lewis' performances, as well as Harry Tierney's song, "Just a Little Kiss".

Cast member George Duryea would become better known by his name Tom Keene, who was a B movie star in his later years. He would also use the name Richard Powers.
