= Square Shooter =

1935 film by David Selman

- Theatrical poster for the film
- Directed by: David Selman
- Written by: Harold Shumate
- Produced by: Irving Briskin
- Starring: Tim McCoy; Jacqueline Wells; Erville Alderson
- Cinematography: George Meehan
- Edited by: Al Clark
- Production company: Columbia Pictures
- Release date: January 21, 1935 (US)
- Running time: 57 minutes
- Country: United States
- Language: English

Square Shooter, which was also known under the title Quicksand, is a 1935 American Western film directed by David Selman and starring Tim McCoy, Jacqueline Wells, and Erville Alderson.

== Cast ==
- Tim McCoy as Tim Baxter
- Julie Bishop as Sally Wayne (as Jacqueline Wells)
- Erville Alderson as Dr. Wayne (as Erville Anderson)
- John Darrow as Johnny Lloyd
- Charles Middleton as Jed Miller
- J. Farrell MacDonald as Sheriff
- Wheeler Oakman as Jim Thorne
- Steve Clark as Pete
