= The Defense Rests =

1934 film by Lambert Hillyer

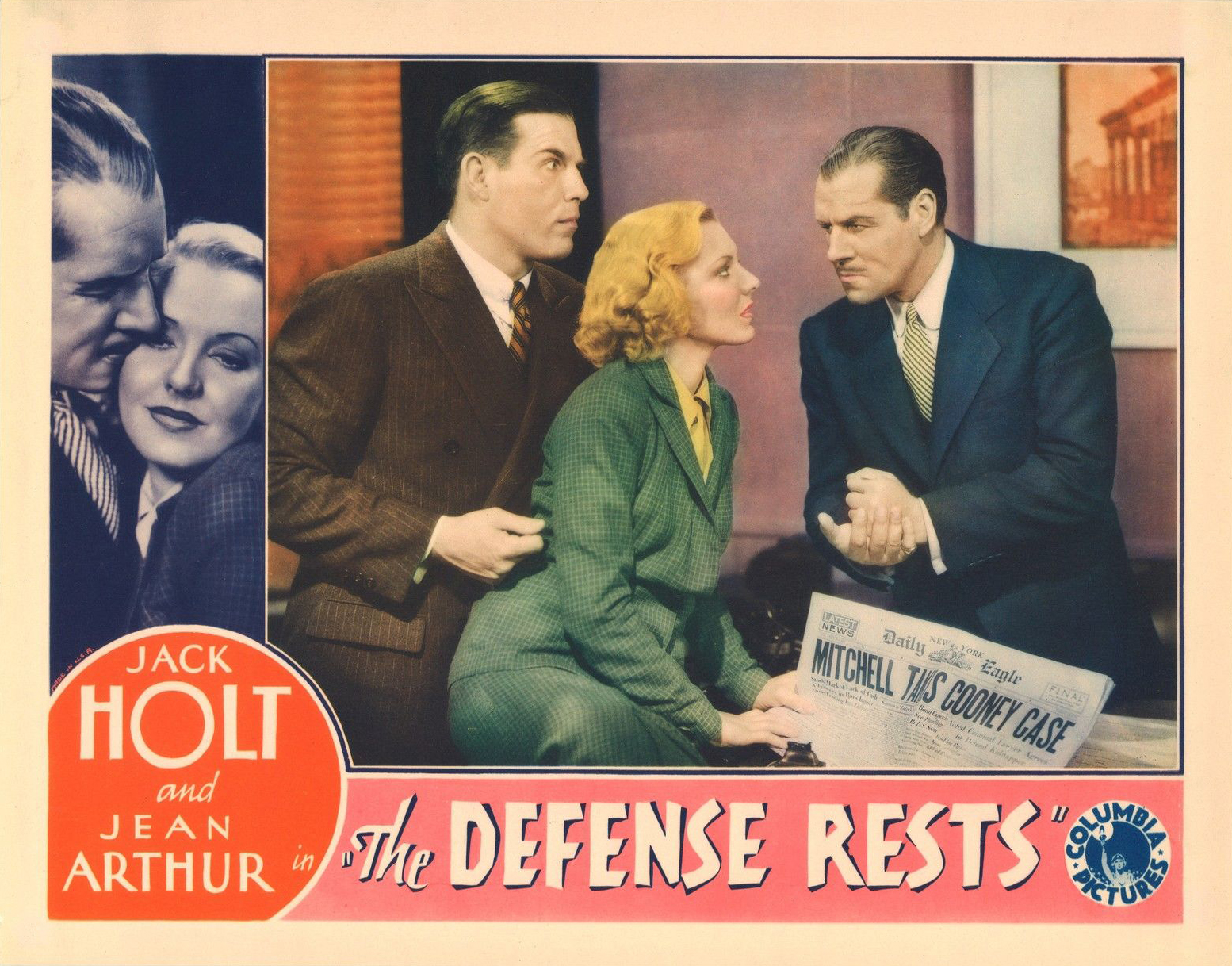
- Lobby card
- Directed by: Lambert Hillyer
- Written by: Jo Swerling
- Produced by: Robert North
- Starring: Jack Holt; Jean Arthur; Nat Pendleton; Arthur Hohl; Raymond Walburn; Harold Huber
- Edited by: John Rawlins
- Music by: Edward Bernds
- Distributed by: Columbia Pictures
- Release date: July 15, 1934
- Running time: 70 minutes
- Country: United States
- Language: English

The Defense Rests (or Take the Witness) is a 1934 American film directed by Lambert Hillyer and starring Jack Holt, Jean Arthur, and Nat Pendleton. The movie was produced in May 1934 and released on 15 July 1934.

== Cast ==
- Jack Holt as Matthew Mitchell
- Jean Arthur as Joan Hayes
- Nat Pendleton as Rocky
- Arthur Hohl as James Randolph
- Raymond Walburn as Austin
- Harold Huber as Castro
- Robert Gleckler as Gentry
- Sarah Padden as Mrs. Evans
- Shirley Grey as Mabel Wilson
- Donald Meek as Fogg
- Raymond Hatton as Nick
- Ward Bond as Good
- John Wray as Cooney
- Vivian Oakland as Mrs. Ballou
- Selmer Jackson as Duffy
- J. Carrol Naish as Ballou
- Samuel S. Hinds as Dean Adams
- Lydia Knott as Patient

== Reception ==
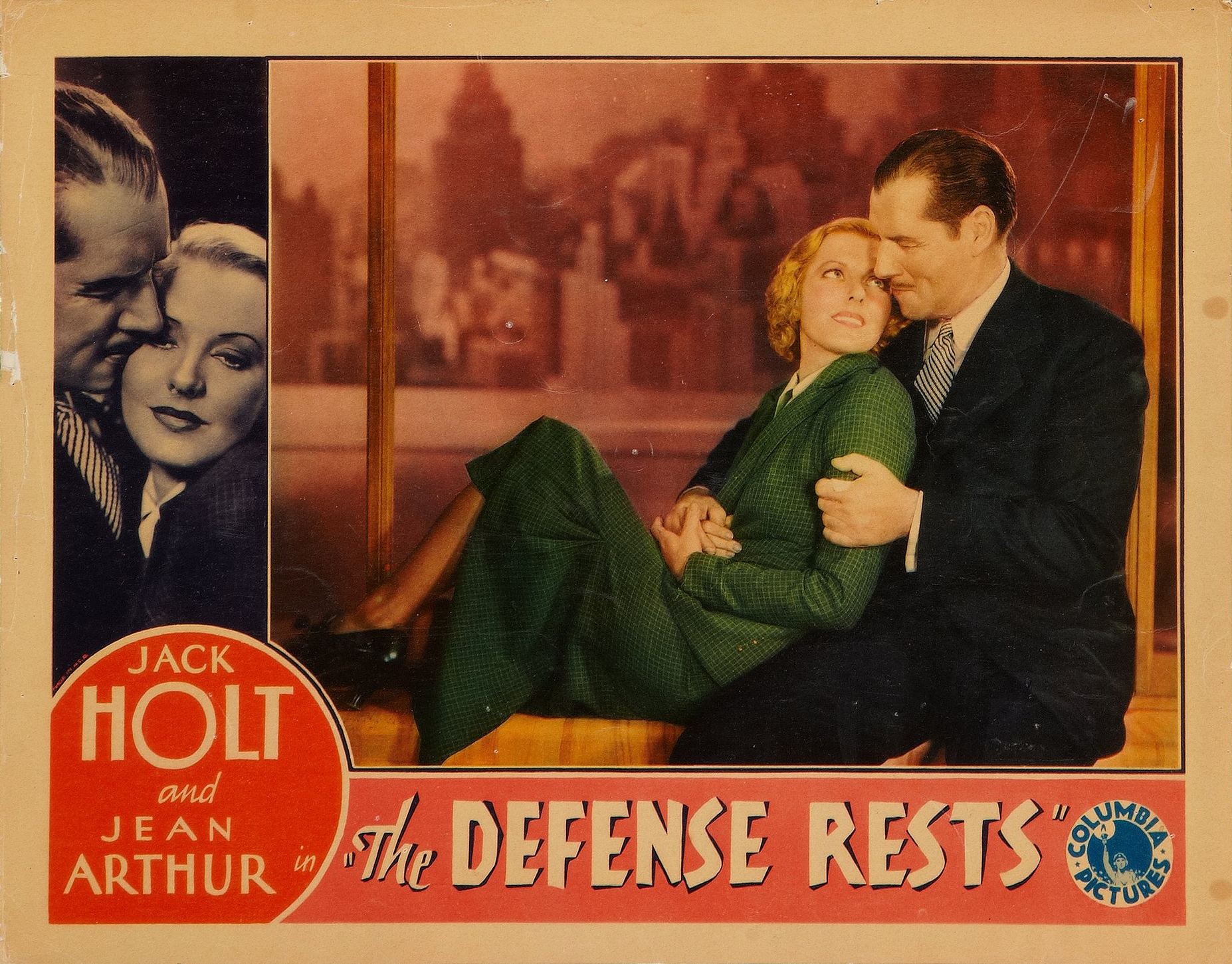
Lobby card

"The story is interestingly woven and its telling is sufficiently swift to hold the visitor's interest," wrote The New York Times. "Mr. Holt and Miss Arthur are about as usual, which is to say they do all that can be reasonably expected of their rôles. Nat Pendleton as Rocky, Mitchell's bodyguard, comes through with the comic relief."
