= King of Dodge City =

1941 film by Lambert Hillyer

- Theatrical release poster
- Directed by: Lambert Hillyer
- Screenplay by: Gerald Geraghty
- Produced by: Leon Barsha
- Starring: Wild Bill Elliott; Tex Ritter; Judith Linden; Dub Taylor; Guy Usher; Rick Anderson
- Cinematography: Benjamin H. Kline
- Edited by: Jerome Thoms
- Production company: Columbia Pictures
- Distributed by: Columbia Pictures
- Release date: August 14, 1941
- Running time: 63 minutes
- Country: United States
- Language: English

King of Dodge City is a 1941 American Western film directed by Lambert Hillyer and written by Gerald Geraghty. The film stars Wild Bill Elliott, Tex Ritter, Judith Linden, Dub Taylor, Guy Usher and Rick Anderson. The film was released on August 14, 1941, by Columbia Pictures. It is the seventh in Columbia Pictures' series of 12 "Wild Bill Hickok" films, followed by Roaring Frontiers.

== Cast ==
- Wild Bill Elliott as Wild Bill Hickok
- Tex Ritter as Tex Rawlings
- Judith Linden as Janice Blair
- Dub Taylor as Cannonball Taylor
- Guy Usher as Morgan King
- Rick Anderson as Judge Lynch
- Kenneth Harlan as Jeff Carruthers
- Pierce Lyden as Reynolds
- Francis Walker as Carney
- Harrison Greene as Stephen Kimball
- Jack Rockwell as Martin
