= Hands Across the Rockies =

1941 film by Lambert Hillyer

- Theatrical release poster
- Directed by: Lambert Hillyer
- Screenplay by: Paul Franklin
- Story by: A Gunsmoke Case for Major Cain by Norbert Davis
- Produced by: Leon Barsha
- Starring: Wild Bill Elliott; Mary Daily; Dub Taylor; Kenneth MacDonald
- Cinematography: Benjamin H. Kline
- Edited by: Mel Thorsen
- Color process: Black and white
- Production company: Columbia Pictures
- Distributed by: Columbia Pictures
- Release date: June 19, 1941
- Running time: 56 minutes
- Country: United States
- Language: English

Hands Across the Rockies is a 1941 American Western film directed by Lambert Hillyer and starring Wild Bill Elliott, Dub Taylor and Kenneth MacDonald. It is the sixth in Columbia Pictures' series of 12 "Wild Bill Hickok" films, followed by King of Dodge City.

== Plot ==
Wild Bill Hickok (Bill Elliott) and Cannonball (Dub Taylor) help two young people in love (Mary Daily and Stanley Brown) and bring the murderer (Kenneth MacDonald) of Cannonball's father to justice.

== Cast ==
- Bill Elliott as Wild Bill Hickok
- Mary Daily as Marsha Crawley
- Dub Taylor as Cannonball Taylor
- Kenneth MacDonald as Juneau Jessup
- Frank LaRue as Rufe Crawley
- Donald Curtis as Dade Crawley
- Tom Moray as Hi Crawley
- Stanley Brown as Johnny Peale
- Slim Whitaker as Marshal Bemis
- Harrison Greene as Abel Finney
- Art Mix as Red - Henchman
- Eddy Waller as Judge Plunkett
- Hugh Prosser as Cash Jennings
