= The Revenge Rider =

1935 film by David Selman

- Theatrical poster for the film
- Directed by: David Selman
- Written by: Ford Beebe
- Produced by: Harry Decker
- Starring: Tim McCoy; Robert Allen; Billie Seward
- Cinematography: Benjamin Kline
- Edited by: Al Clark
- Production company: Columbia Pictures
- Release date: March 18, 1935 (US)
- Running time: 60 minutes
- Country: United States
- Language: English

The Revenge Rider is a 1935 American Western film directed by David Selman, which stars Tim McCoy, Robert Allen, and Billie Seward.

== Cast ==
- Tim McCoy as Tim O'Neil
- Robert Allen as Chad Harmon
- Billie Seward as Myra Harmon
- Edward Earle as Kramer
- Jack Clifford as Ludlow
- Frank Sheridan as Jed Harmon
- Jack Mower as Vance
- George C. Pearce as Dr. Lindsay
- Allan Sears as Lynch
- Harry Semels as Rankin
