= The Cowboy Star =

1936 film by David Selman

- Poster for the film
- Directed by: David Selman
- Screenplay by: Frances Guihan
- Story by: Frank Melford; Cornelius Reece
- Produced by: Harry L. Decker
- Starring: Charles Starrett
- Cinematography: Allen G. Siegler
- Edited by: William Lyon
- Production company: Columbia Pictures
- Distributed by: Columbia Pictures
- Release date: November 20, 1936 (US)
- Running time: 56 minutes
- Country: United States
- Language: English

The Cowboy Star is a 1936 American Western film directed by David Selman and starring Charles Starrett.

== Plot ==
Spencer Yorke is a star of western films, but he has grown tired of the unreality of the movies in which he appears. He decides he wants to buy a ranch, raise cattle, and live a real life in the west. He refuses to renew his contract with his producer, Jack Kingswell, and heads home to Arizona under the assumed name of George Weston, accompanied by his film sidekick, Buckshot. The two arrive in the small town of Taylorsville, where they meet Sheriff Clem Baker, and his daughter, Mary, who is the local real estate agent. Clem's son and Mary's younger brother, Jimmy, wants to explore a nearby landmark, "Ghost Town", but Clem forbids him to go, saying it is too dangerous.

Shortly after their arrival, Yorke and Buckshot save two people from some runaway horses, giving them instant local celebrity. While both Jimmy and Mary question his identity, recognizing him as the film star, Yorke denies their claims, insisting that his name is George Weston. Dubious, Mary reluctantly accepts his undercover name, but Jimmy isn't willing to let go of his desire to that he be his favorite film idol. As Yorke settles into the community, he purchases a local ranch, using Mary as his agent. While they are consummating the deal, the two also fall in love.

Eventually Jimmy disobeys his father and heads over to Ghost Town. Upon his arrival he is taken prisoner by three criminals who are hiding out in the abandoned town. Knowing Jimmy is the sheriff's son, they suspect him of being sent to spy on them. They also think that Yorke isn't who he says he is, and his true identity is that of an undercover G-man. When his son fails to return, Clem heads out to the Ghost Town, where he is shot by the gangsters. Yorke and Buckshot have followed Clem, and engage the gangsters, during which Jimmy is able to escape, turning the gangsters own guns on them. Two of the crooks are killed, and Yorke knocks out the final one.

After the fight, Yorke's true identity is revealed. His heroism becomes public knowledge, whereby his producer, Kingswell, offers a significantly larger salary for a new contract, which Yorke accepts. Mary agrees to marry Yorke and go to Hollywood with him, accompanied by Jimmy.

== Cast ==
- Charles Starrett as Spencer Yorke/George Weston
- Iris Meredith as Mary Baker
- Si Jenks as Buckshot
- Marc Lawrence as Johnny Simpson
- Edward Peil Sr. as Clem Baker (as Ed Peil Sr.)
- Wally Albright as Jimmy Baker
- Ralph McCullough as Pretty Boy Hogan
- Richard Terry as Midget
- Landers Stevens as Jack Kingswell

== Production ==
Production on the film began in early September 1936. Variety reported that David Selman would be directing the picture, under the production of Harry Decker. Iris Meredith (announced under her maiden name, Iris Shunn) was associated with the film in late September. Variety also revealed in late September that Arthur Rankin, Robert Fiske, Ann Merrill, and Lucille Lund had been added to the cast. The movie was still in production in late September, finally wrapping on September 23. The film was being edited in the early part of October. Also in October it was revealed that Cy Jenks, Wally Albright, and Marc Lawrence were in the cast. In early November it was announced that the film would be released on November 20, 1936. It was the second in a series of films starring Charles Starrett, produced by Columbia Pictures.

== Reception ==
Motion Picture Herald gave the film a good review. They found the plot and storyline unique and refreshing, saying it "seeks to introduce something fresh in many ways into standby western yarns."
