= Kentucky Days =

1923 film directed by David Selman

- Directed by: David Selman (as David Soloman)
- Screenplay by: Dorothy Yost
- Story by: John Lynch
- Produced by: William Fox
- Starring: Dustin Farnum; Margaret Fielding; Miss Woodthrop
- Production company: Fox Film Corporation
- Release date: December 2, 1923 (US)
- Running time: 5 reels
- Country: United States
- Language: English

Kentucky Days is a 1923 American silent film directed by David Selman (credited as David Soloman), which stars Dustin Farnum, Margaret Fielding, and Miss Woodthrop. The screenplay was written by Dorothy Yost from a story by John Lynch. It was released on December 2, 1923.

== Plot ==
As described in a film magazine review, in 1849, John Buckner, Kentuckian, goes West to the California goldfields and makes a fortune. Returning to Kentucky after a couple of years, he is convinced that his wife loves Gordon Carter and kills the latter in a duel. John heads West again taking his wife Elizabeth with him, although they are still on bad terms. Elizabeth's unfailing courage during the many perils of the journey wins John's esteem. After he rescues her when she is lost in a sandstorm, they are completely reconciled.

== Cast ==
- Dustin Farnum as Don Buckner
- Margaret Fielding as Elizabeth Clayborne
- Miss Woodthrop as Margarite Buckner
- Bruce Gordon as Gordon Carter
- William De Vaull as Scipio
