= David Selman =

American film director

- Born: 1878
- Died: August 1, 1937 (aged 58–59); Los Angeles, California, United States
- Other name: David Solomon
- Occupation: Director
- Years active: 1923–1937 (film)

David Selman (1878 – August 1, 1937) was an American film director.

== Selected filmography ==
- South Sea Love (1923)
- Kentucky Days (1923)
- Remember (1926)
- Resurrection (1931)
- The Westerner (1934)
- Fighting Shadows (1935)
- Gallant Defender (1935)
- Justice of the Range (1935)
- The Revenge Rider (1935)
- Riding Wild (1935)
- Square Shooter (1935)
- Secret Patrol (1936)
- The Mysterious Avenger (1936)
- Tugboat Princess (1936)
- The Cowboy Star (1936)
- Woman Against the World (1937)
- Find the Witness (1937)
- Texas Trail (1937)

== Bibliography ==
- Larry Langman & Daniel Finn. A Guide to American Crime Films of the Thirties. Greenwood Press, 1995.
