= South of the Rio Grande (1932 film) =

1932 film

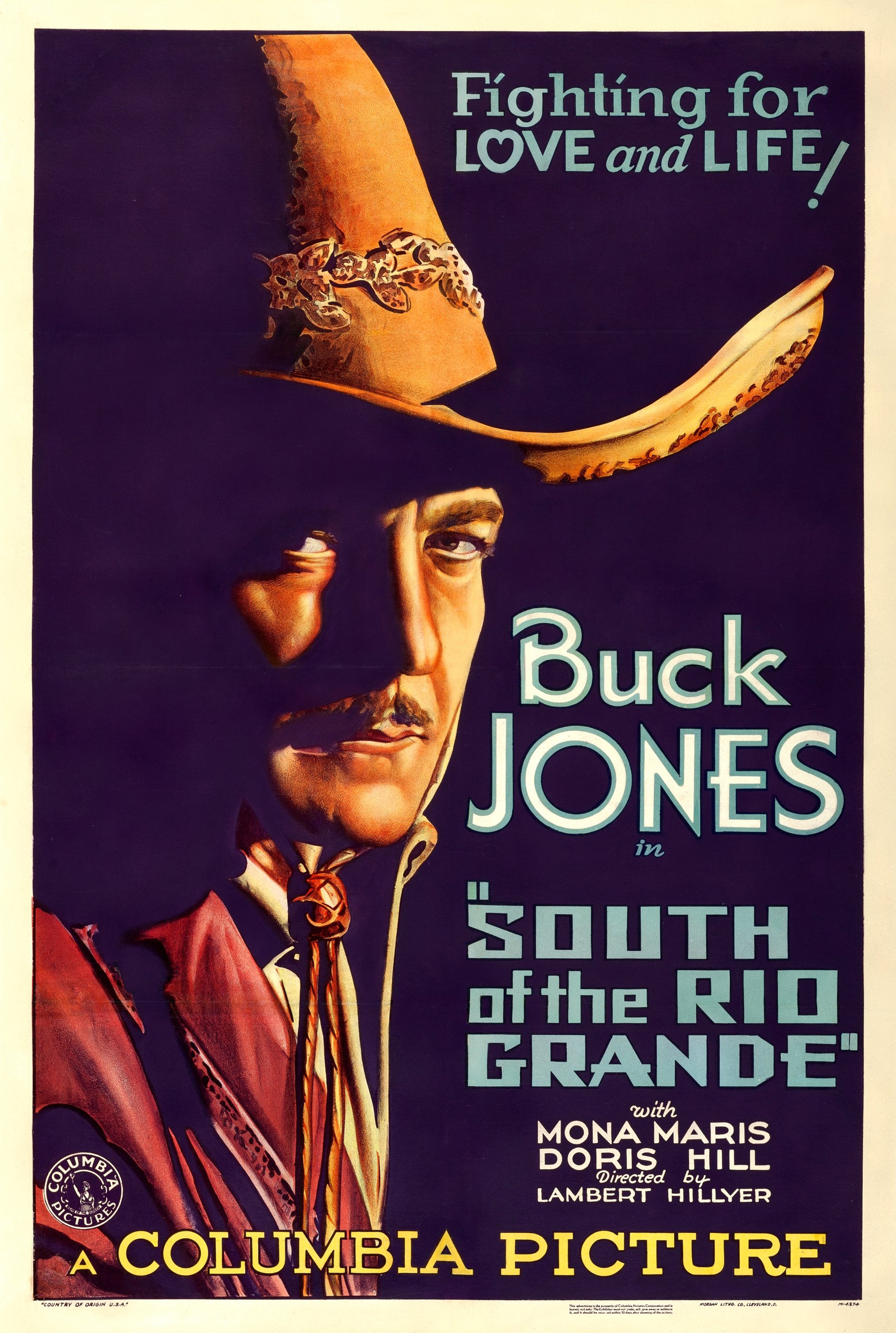
- Theatrical release poster
- Directed by: Lambert Hillyer
- Written by: Harold Shumate(story); Milton Krims(adaptation)
- Produced by: Irving Briskin
- Starring: Buck Jones
- Cinematography: Benjamin Kline
- Edited by: Maurice Wright
- Distributed by: Columbia Pictures
- Release date: March 5, 1932
- Running time: 61 minutes

South of the Rio Grande is a 1932 American pre-Code Western film directed by Lambert Hillyer and starring Buck Jones. A copy is preserved in the Library of Congress collection.

== Cast ==
- Buck Jones - Sergeant Carlos Olivarez (as Charles 'Buck' Jones)
- Mona Maris - Consuela Delgado
- George J. Lewis - Corporal Ramon Ruiz (as George Lewis)
- Doris Hill - Dolores Ruiz
- Philo McCullough - Clark (as Philo McCollough)
- Paul Fix - Juan Olivarez
- James Durkin - Senor Ruiz
- Charles Stevens - Pedro
- Charles Requa - Andres (uncredited)
- Harry Semels - Bandido Leader (uncredited)
- Charles Brinley - Manuel (uncredited)
- Joe Dominguez - Bandido (uncredited)
- Al Haskell - Bandido (uncredited)
- Edward LeSaint - Mayor (uncredited)
- Merrill McCormick - Perdido (uncredited)
- Silver - Carlos' Horse (uncredited)
