= Lambert Hillyer =

American film director

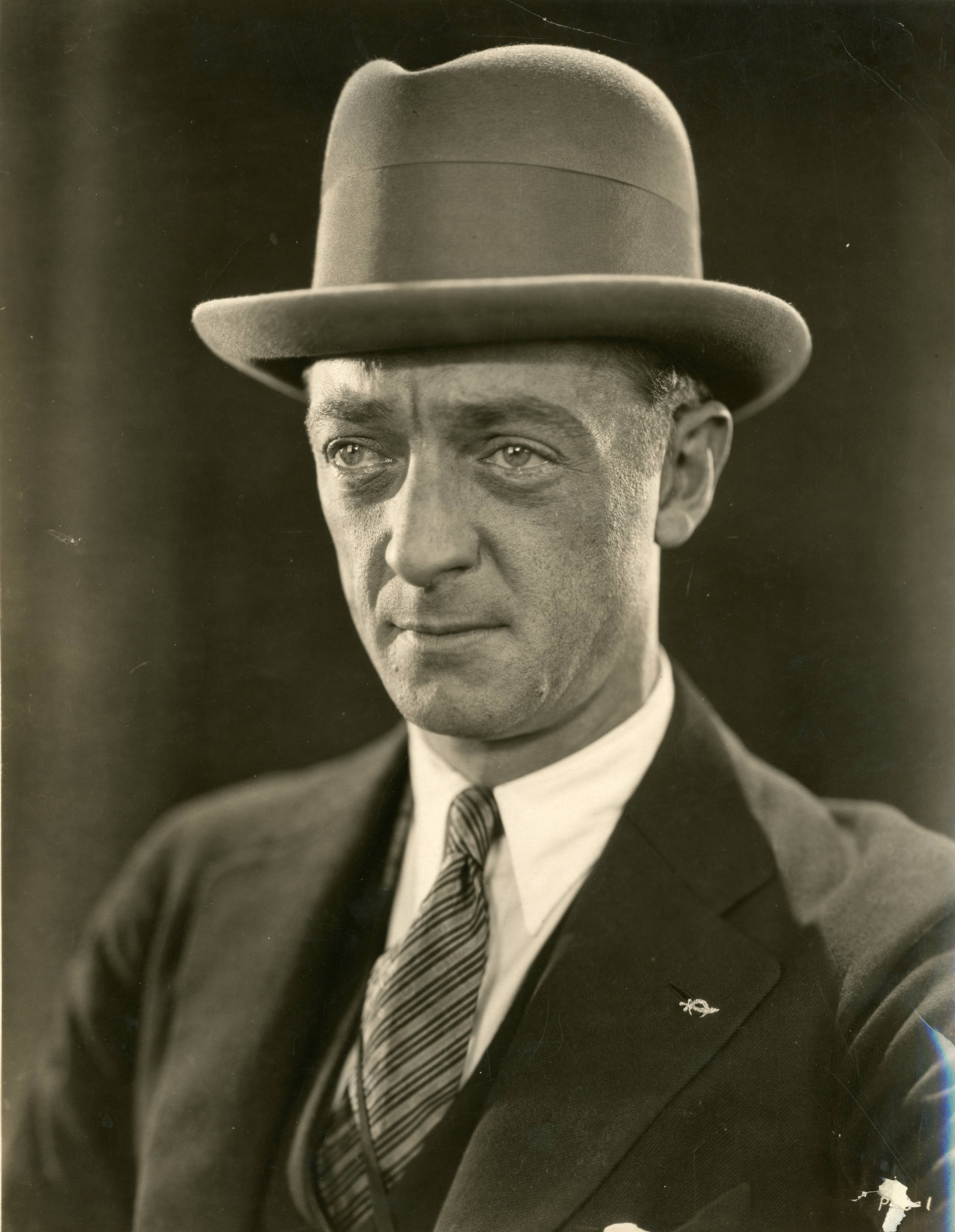
- Born: Lambert Harwood Hillyer; July 8, 1893; Tyner, Indiana
- Died: July 5, 1969 (aged 75); Los Angeles, California
- Occupations: Film director, screenwriter
- Years active: 1917–1957
- Spouse: Lucille Stein

Lambert Hillyer (July 8, 1893 – July 5, 1969) was an American film director and screenwriter. He is best known today for his many western features, his horror films The Invisible Ray and Dracula's Daughter, and the first Batman serial.

== Biography ==
Lambert Harwood Hillyer was born July 8, 1893, in Tyner, Indiana (his 1946 résumé amended this to South Bend, Indiana). His mother was character actress Lydia Knott. A graduate of Drake College, he worked as a newspaper reporter and short-story writer, then as an actor in vaudeville and stock theater. During World War I he began working in motion pictures with the Mutual company. He began his career as a director with Paramount-Artcraft, then First National, Goldwyn, and Fox. He became a specialist in westerns, working on many silent features starring William S. Hart, Buck Jones, Tom Mix, and others.

Hillyer expanded into romantic melodramas and crime films in the 1920s. In 1936 he directed two chillers for Universal, the science-fiction film The Invisible Ray and the cult horror film Dracula's Daughter.

He directed many features for Columbia Pictures in the 1930s and early 1940s. Some were major productions like The Defense Rests (1935) with Jack Holt and Jean Arthur, but most were low-budget action features. In 1940 he was assigned to Columbia's Charles Starrett westerns, including The Durango Kid (1940), which later inspired a popular series. When Starrett left the studio temporarily, Hillyer was reassigned to the Bill Elliott series, which he directed through 1942. One of Hillyer's most famous credits is the Batman serial (1943), which was memorable enough to be re-released in 1954, 1962, and 1965. The 1965 revival inspired the very successful Batman TV series.

After his tenure with Columbia ended in 1943, Hillyer moved to RKO Radio Pictures briefly, where he directed a Tim Holt western and a pair of two-reel comedies with Leon Errol. Hillyer then began a six-year association with Monogram Pictures, first with the Sam Katzman crime story Smart Guy and then a series with the studio's newest cowboy star Johnny Mack Brown. Hillyer also directed Monogram's other western leads Jimmy Wakely and Whip Wilson.

== Television ==
Like many directors who were accustomed to low budgets and speedy schedules, Lambert Hillyer made a smooth transition to the new field of television. He directed 40 episodes of the syndicated Western The Cisco Kid. Hillyer also directed seven episodes of Highway Patrol, which starred Broderick Crawford. His last assignment came in 1957, a single episode of the secret-agent show The Man Called X, under the pseudonym Lambert Hill.

Hillyer died July 5, 1969, in Los Angeles, California.

== Filmography ==
=== Director ===
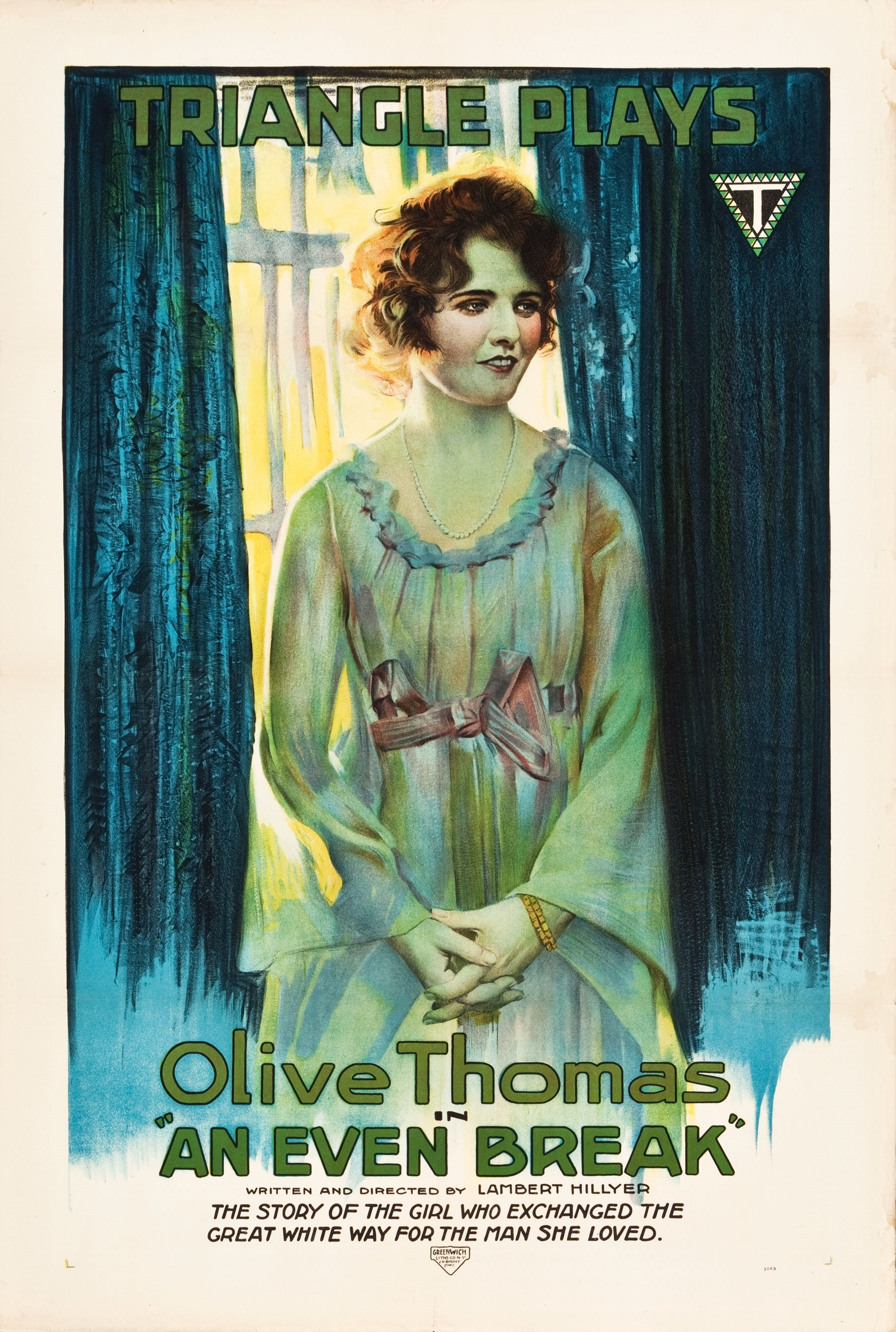
Poster for An Even Break (1917)

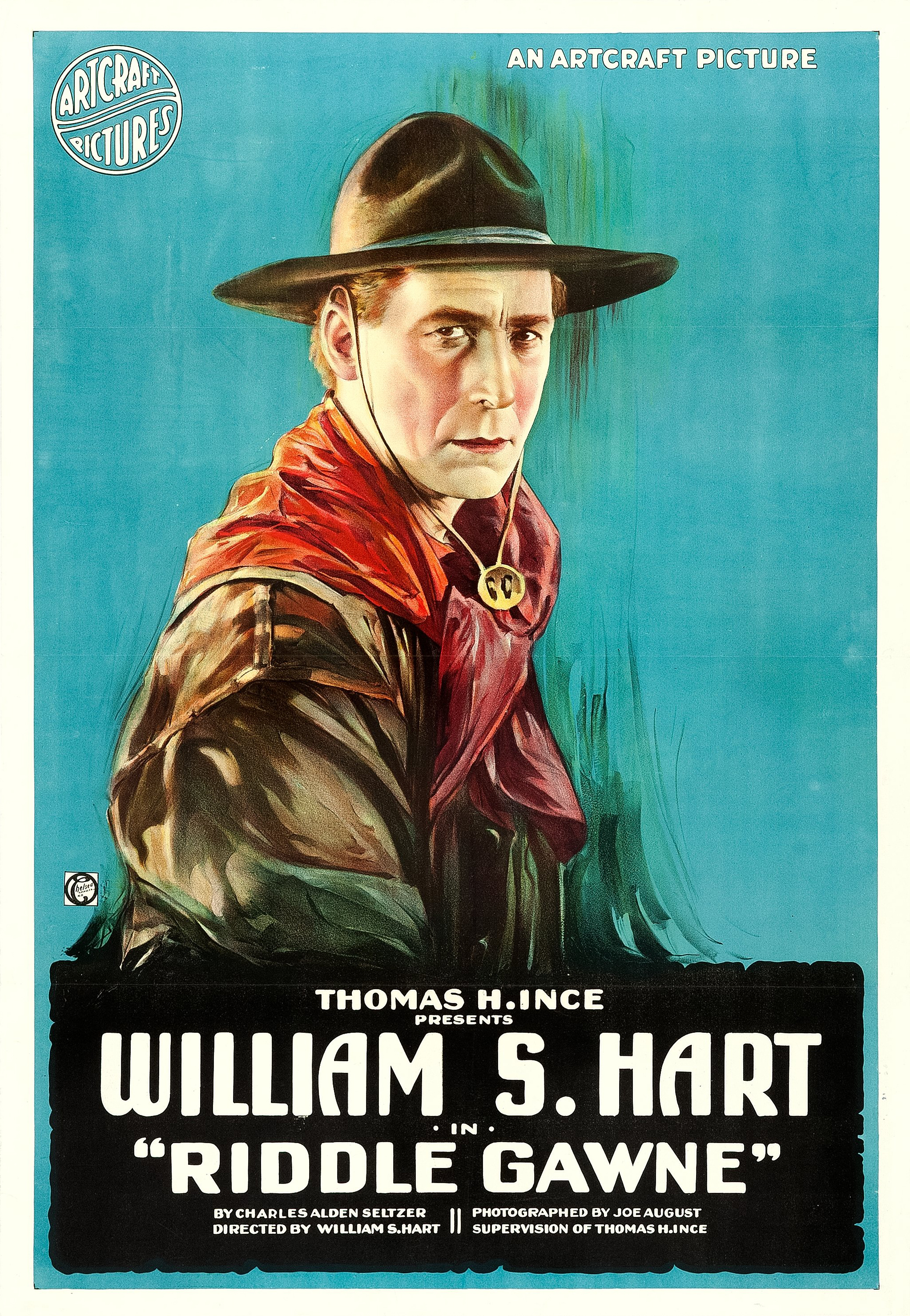
Poster for Riddle Gawne (1918)

Online film of Wagon Tracks (1919)

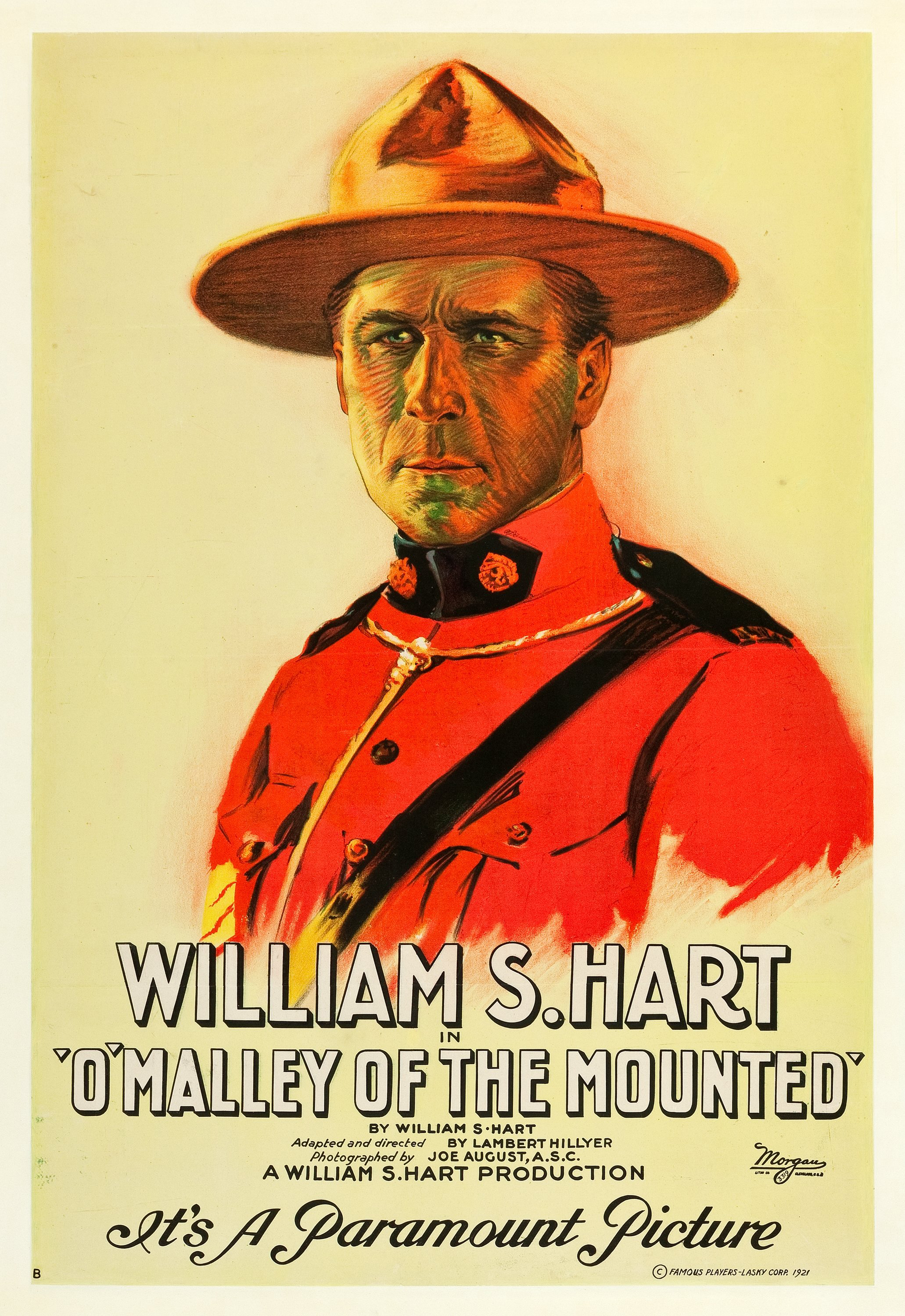
Poster for O'Malley of the Mounted (1921)

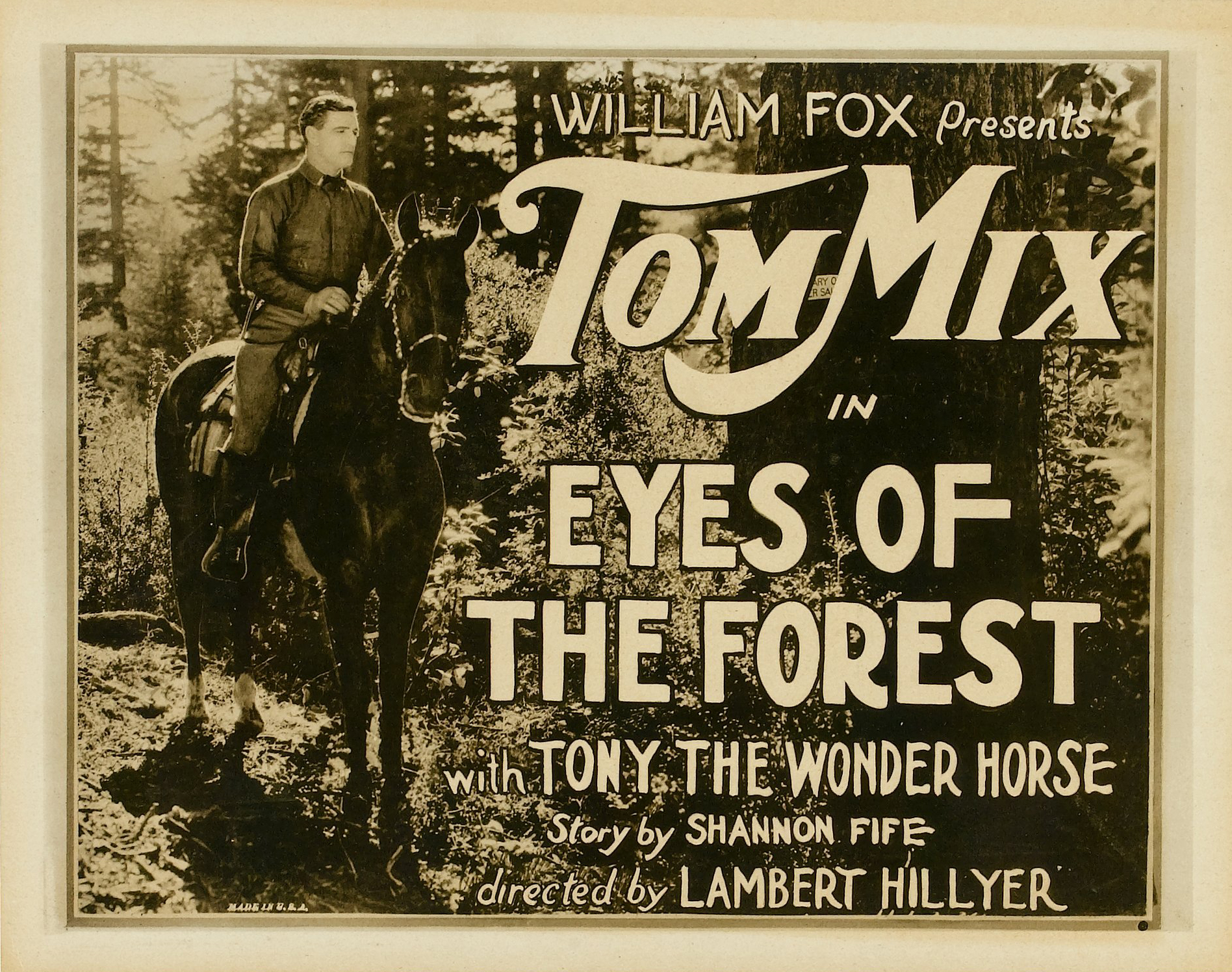
Lobby card for Eyes of the Forest (1923)

Poster for Idle Tongues (1924)

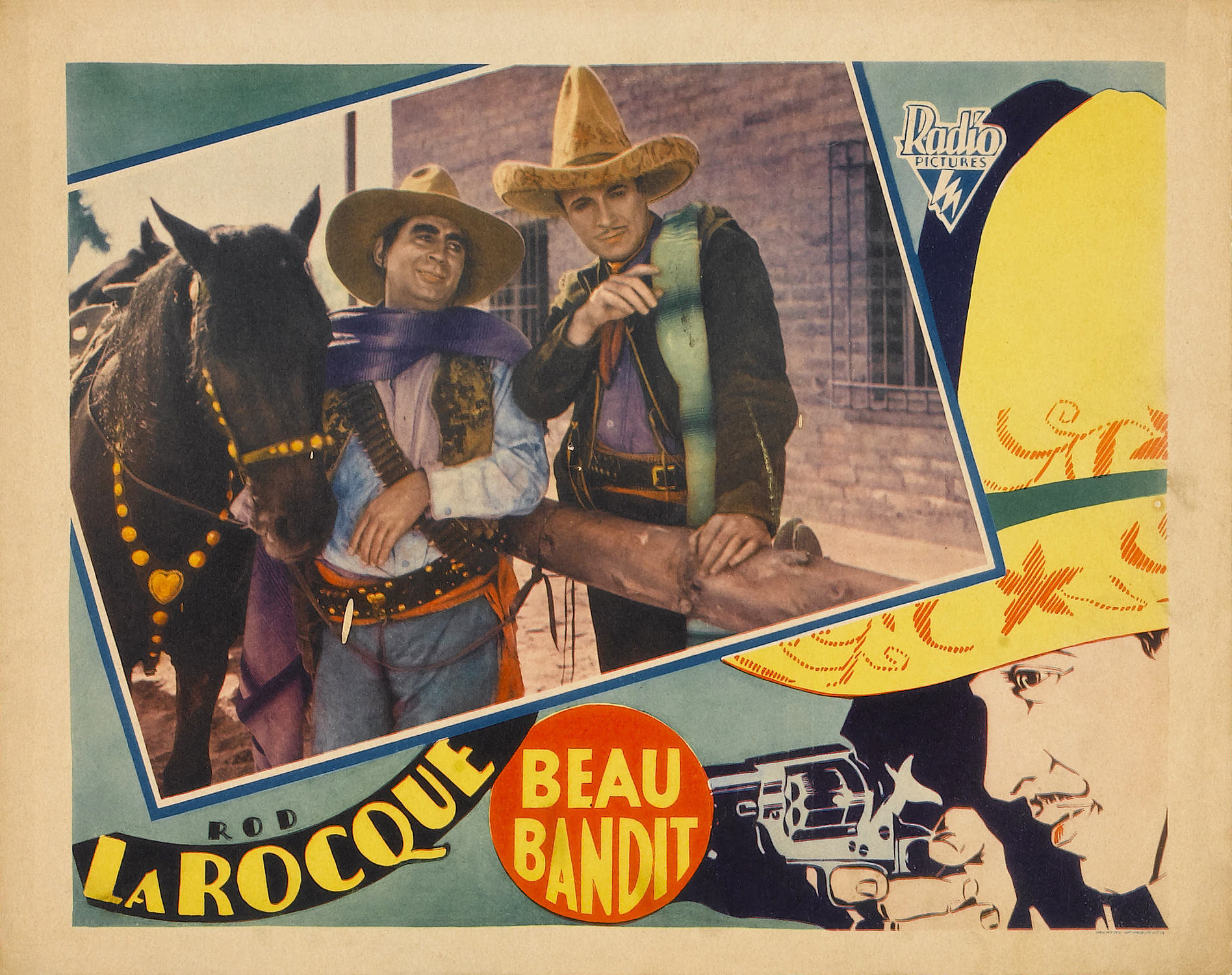
Lobby card for Beau Bandit (1930)

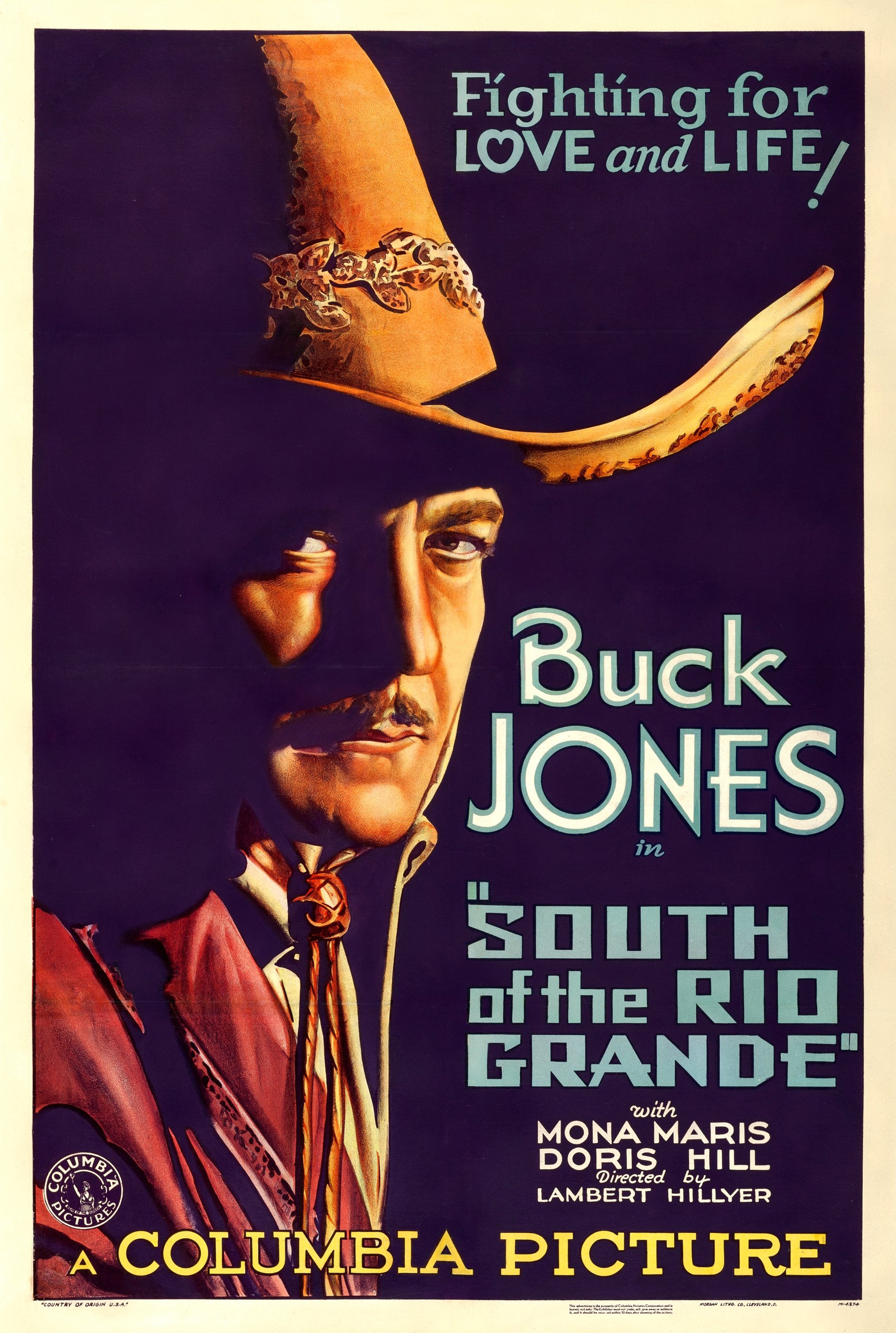
Poster for South of the Rio Grande (1932)

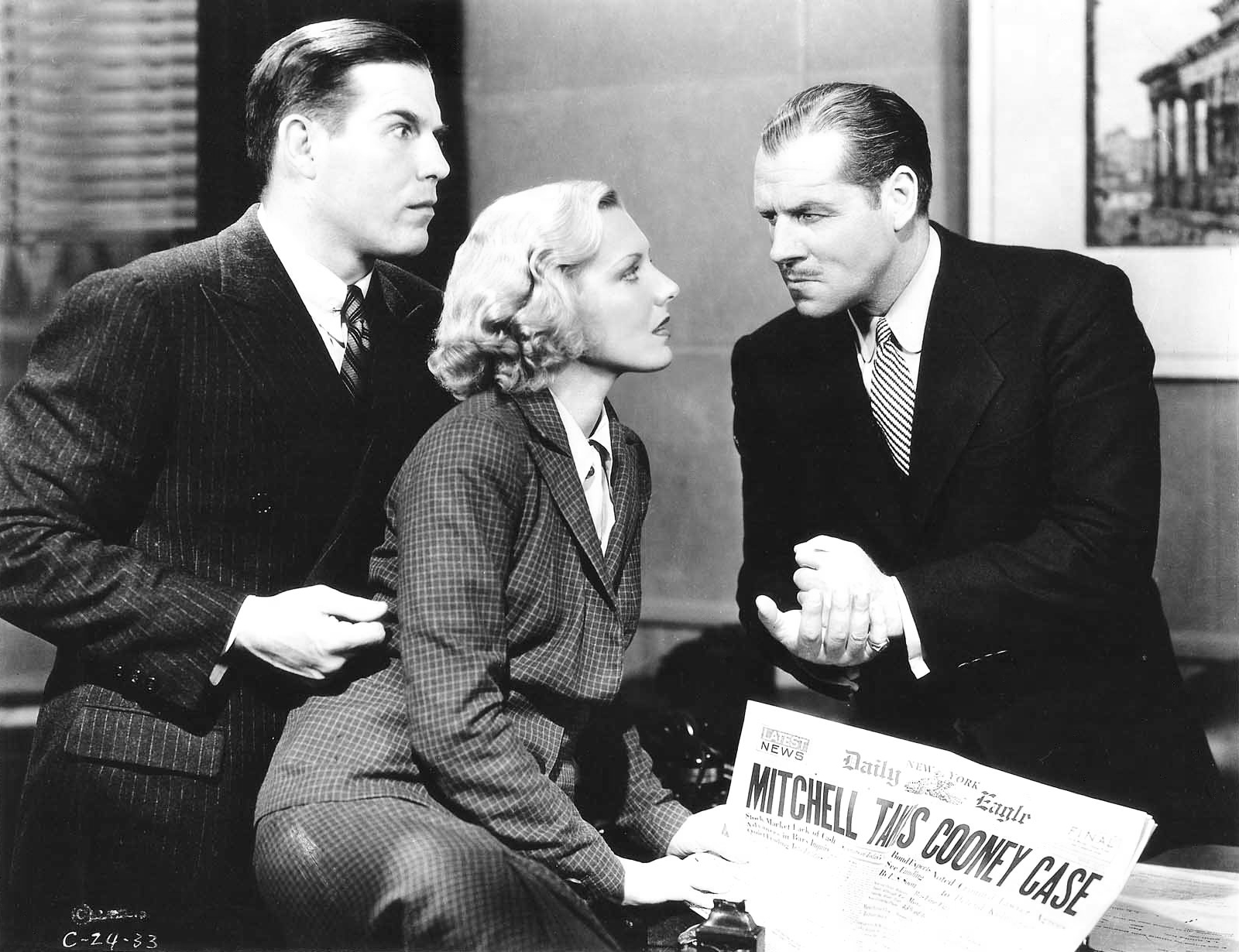
Nat Pendleton, Jean Arthur and Jack Holt in The Defense Rests (1934)

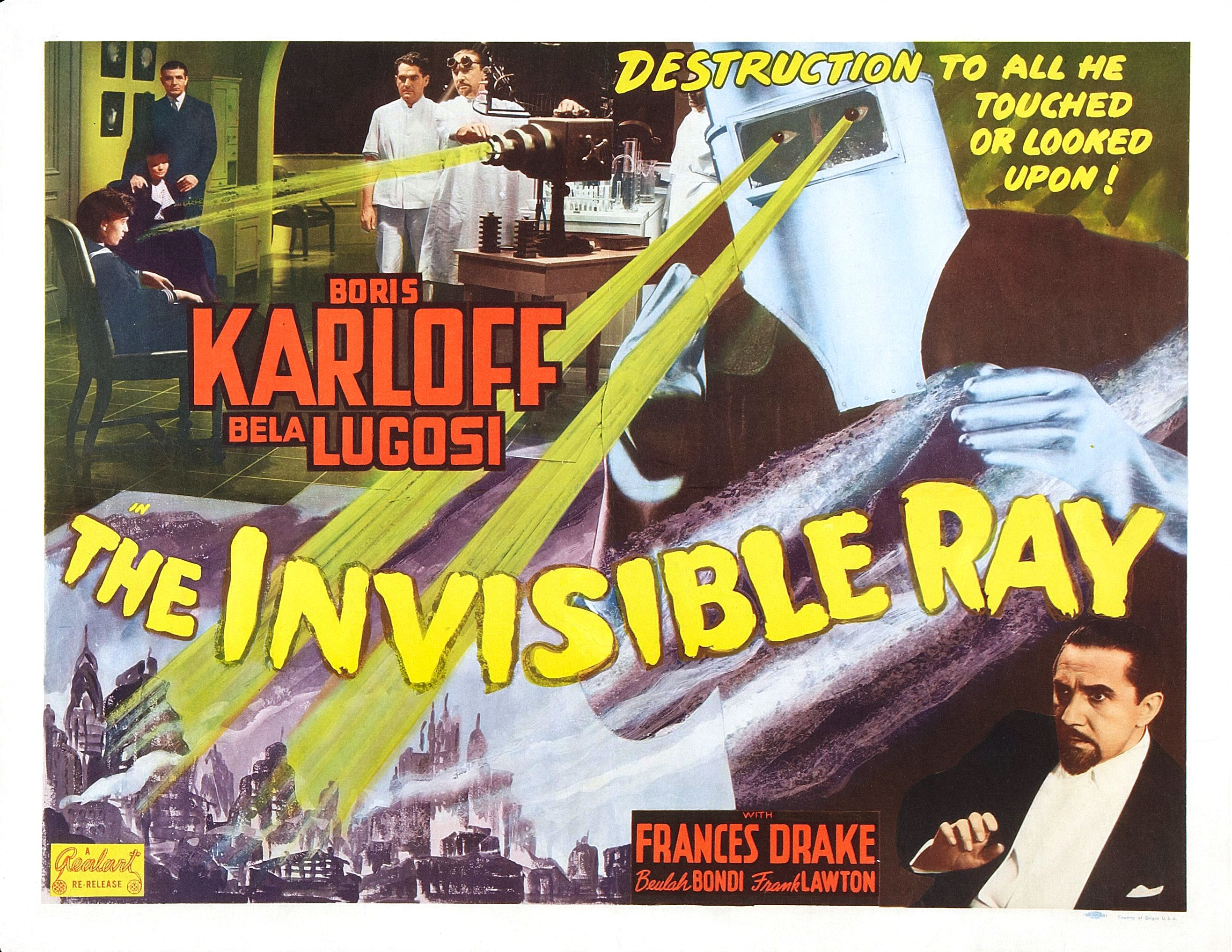
Poster for The Invisible Ray (1936)

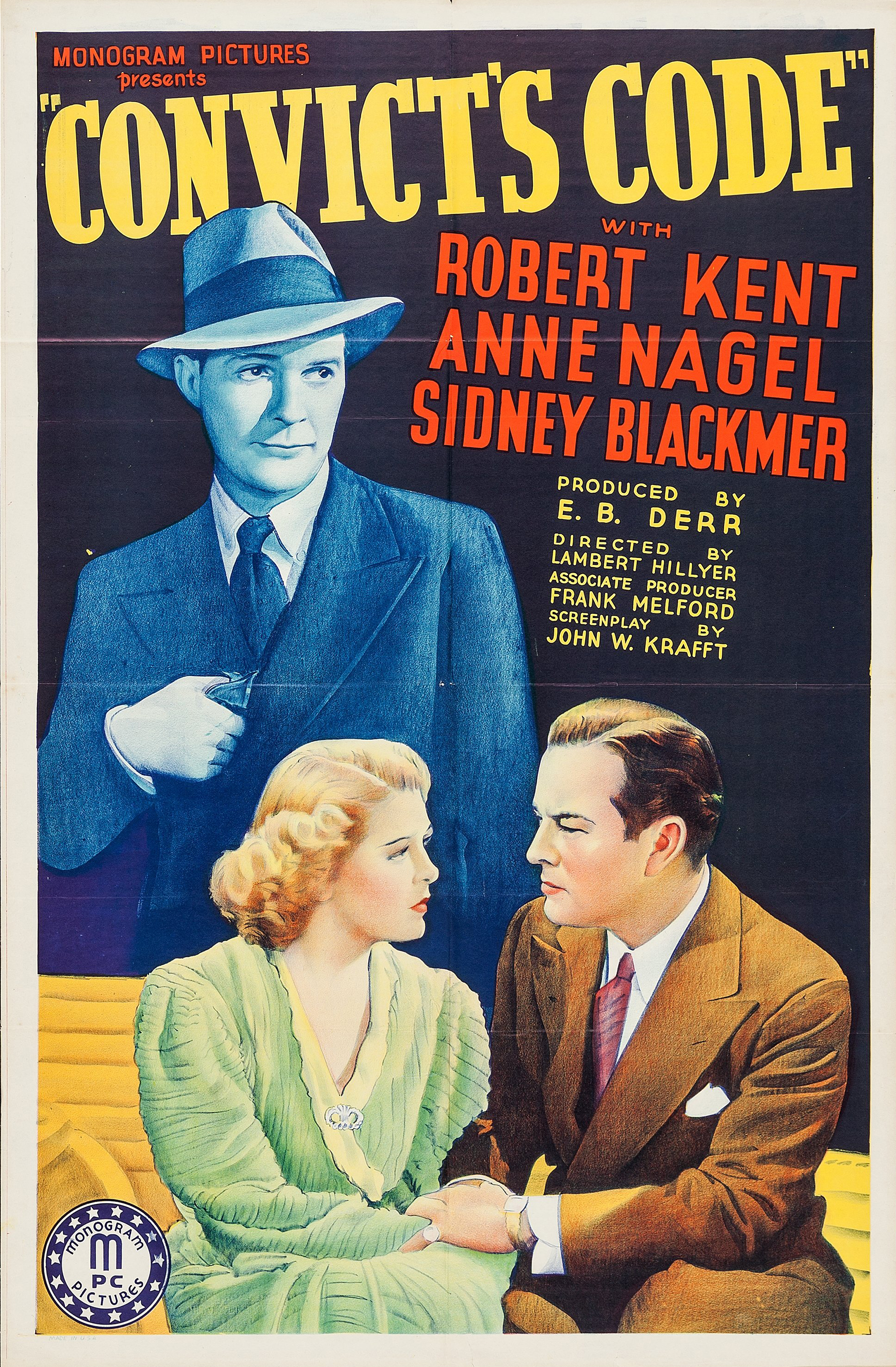
Poster for Convict's Code (1939)

Year	Title	Notes
1917	An Even Break	Also screenwriter
1917	Strife	
1917	The Narrow Trail	
1918	Riddle Gawne	
1919	Breed of Men	
1919	The Poppy Girl's Husband	
1919	The Money Corral	Also screenwriter
1919	Square Deal Sanderson	Also screenwriter
1919	Wagon Tracks	
1919	John Petticoats	
1920	The Toll Gate	Also screenwriter
1920	Sand!	Also screenwriter
1920	The Cradle of Courage	Also screenwriter
1920	The Testing Block	Also screenwriter
1921	O'Malley of the Mounted	
1921	The Whistle	Also screenwriter
1921	Three Word Brand	Also screenwriter
1921	White Oak	
1922	White Hands	Also screenwriter
1922	Travelin' On	Also screenwriter
1922	Caught Bluffing	
1922	Skin Deep	
1922	The Super-Sex	Also screenwriter
1922	The Altar Stairs	
1923	Scars of Jealousy	Also screenwriter
1923	The Shock	
1923	Temporary Marriage	Also screenwriter
1923	The Spoilers	
1923	The Lone Star Ranger	Also screenwriter
1923	Eyes of the Forest	
1923	Mile-a-Minute Romeo	
1924	Those Who Dance	Also screenwriter
1924	Barbara Frietchie	Also screenwriter
1924	Idle Tongues	
1925	I Want My Man	
1925	The Making of O'Malley	
1925	The Knockout	
1925	The Unguarded Hour	
1926	Her Second Chance	
1926	Miss Nobody	
1926	30 Below Zero	
1927	The War Horse	Also screenwriter
1927	Hills of Peril	
1927	Chain Lightning	Also screenwriter
1928	The Branded Sombrero	Also screenwriter
1928	Fleetwing	Also screenwriter
1930	Beau Bandit	
1931	The Deadline	Also screenwriter
1931	One Man Law	Also screenwriter
1932	The Fighting Fool	
1932	South of the Rio Grande	
1932	Hello Trouble	Also screenwriter
1932	White Eagle	
1932	Forbidden Trail	
1932	Sundown Rider	Also screenwriter
1933	The California Trail	Also screenwriter
1933	Unknown Valley	Also screenwriter
1933	Dangerous Crossroads	
1933	Police Car 17	Also screenwriter
1933	Master of Men	
1933	Before Midnight	
1933	The Fighting Code	Also screenwriter
1934	Once to Every Woman	
1934	The Man Trailer	Also screenwriter
1934	The Most Precious Thing in Life	
1934	The Defense Rests	
1934	Against the Law	
1934	Men of the Night	Also screenwriter
1935	Behind the Evidence	
1935	In Spite of Danger	
1935	Men of the Hour	
1935	The Awakening of Jim Burke	
1935	Super Speed	
1935	Guard That Girl	Also screenwriter
1936	The Invisible Ray	
1936	Dangerous Waters	
1936	Dracula's Daughter	
1937	Speed to Spare	Also screenwriter
1937	Girls Can Play	Also screenwriter
1937	All American Sweetheart	
1938	Women in Prison	
1938	My Old Kentucky Home	
1938	Extortion	Also screenwriter
1938	Gang Bullets	
1939	Convict's Code	
1939	Should a Girl Marry?	
1939	Girl from Rio	
1940	The Durango Kid	
1940	Beyond the Sacramento	
1940	The Wildcat of Tucson	
1941	The Pinto Kid	
1941	The Son of Monte Cristo	Second-unit director
1941	North from the Lone Star	
1941	Hands Across the Rockies	
1941	The Medico of Painted Springs	
1941	The Son of Davy Crockett	Also screenwriter
1941	Thunder Over the Prairie	
1941	King of Dodge City	
1941	Prairie Stranger	
1941	Roaring Frontiers	
1941	The Royal Mounted Patrol}	
1942	The Devil's Trail	
1942	North of the Rockies	
1942	Prairie Gunsmoke	
1942	Vengeance of the West	
1943	Fighting Frontier	
1943	Bombardier	Aerial action sequences (uncredited)
1943	The Stranger from Pecos	
1943	Six Gun Gospel	
1943	Smart Guy	
1943	''The Texas Kid	
1943	Batman	15-part serial
1944	Partners of the Trail	
1944	Law Men	
1944	Range Law	
1944	West of the Rio Grande	
1944	Land of the Outlaws	
1944	Ghost Guns	
1945	Beyond the Pecos	
1945	Flame of the West	
1945	Stranger from Santa Fe	
1945	South of the Rio Grande	
1945	The Lost Trail	
1945	Frontier Feud	
1946	Border Bandits	
1946	Under Arizona Skies	
1946	The Gentleman from Texas	
1946	Silver Range	
1946	Trigger Fingers	
1946	Shadows on the Range	
1947	Raiders of the South	
1947	Valley of Fear	
1947	Land of the Lawless	
1947	The Law Comes to Gunsight	
1947	Trailing Danger	
1947	The Hat Box Mystery	
1947	The Case of the Baby Sitter	
1947	Flashing Guns	
1947	Gun Talk	
1948	Overland Trails	
1948	Song of the Drifter	
1948	Oklahoma Blues	
1948	Crossed Trails	
1948	Partners of the Sunset	
1948	Frontier Agent	
1948	Range Renegades	
1948	The Fighting Ranger	
1948	The Sheriff of Medicine Bow	
1948	Outlaw Brand	
1948	Sundown Riders	
1949	Gun Runner	
1949	Gun Law Justice	
1949	Trails End	
1949	Haunted Trails	
1949	Riders of the Dusk	
1949	Range Land	

=== Screenwriter ===
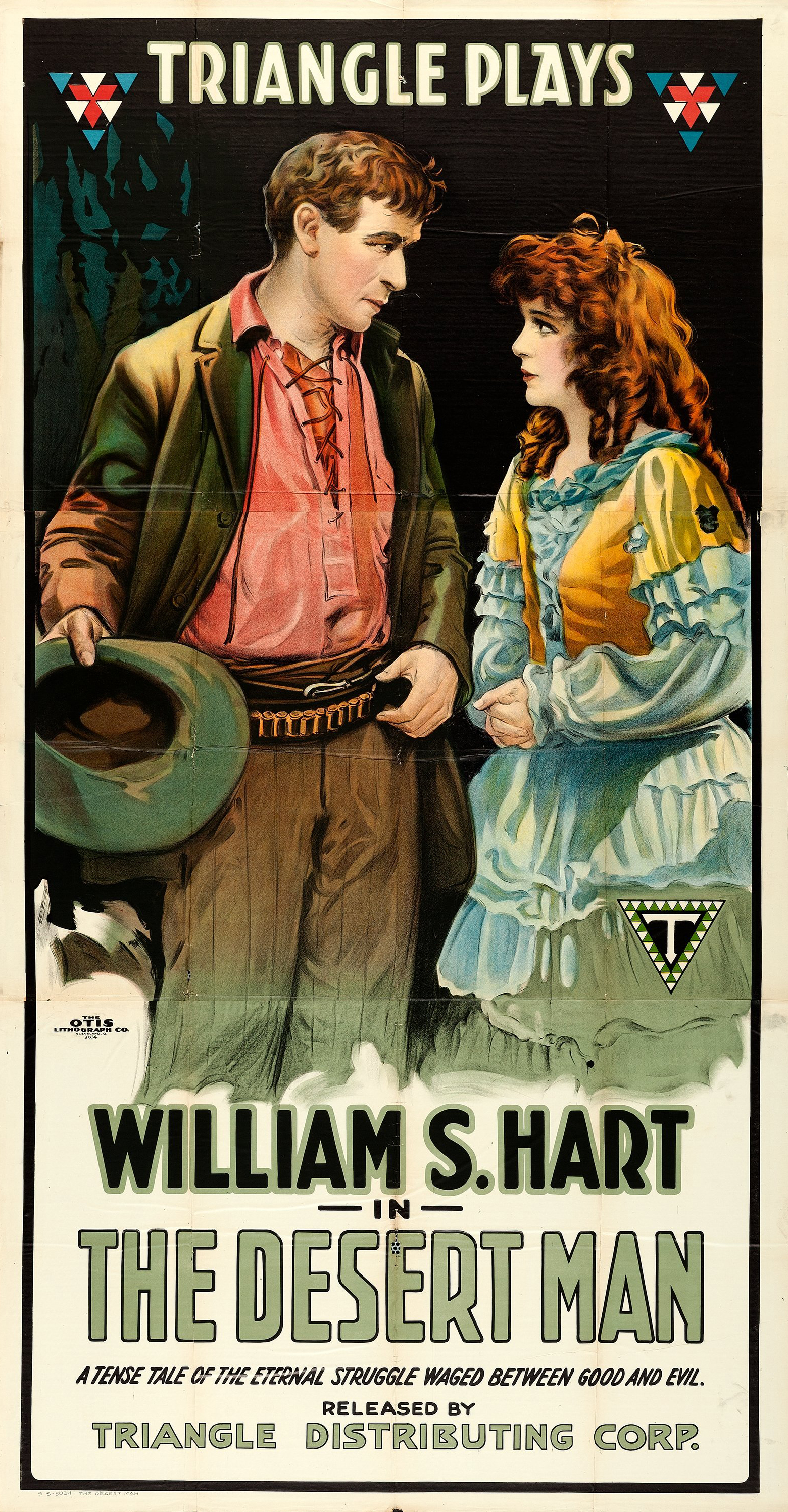
Poster for The Desert Man (1917), scenario by Lambert Hillyer

In addition to writing screenplays for many of the films he directed, as noted above, Hillyer wrote or contributed to the screenplays for these motion pictures.

Year	Title	Notes
1917	They're Off	
1917	The Mother Instinct	
1917	The Desert Man	
1917	The Little Brother	
1917	Love or Justice	
1917	The Snarl	
1917	One Shot Ross	
1917	The Silent Man	
1921	The Man from Lost River	
1930	Hide-Out	
1933	Straightaway	
1933	State Trooper	
1935	Law Beyond the Range	
1937	The Shadow	
1938	Highway Patrol	
1939	Parents on Trial	
1939	The Officer and the Lady	
