= Tugboat Princess =

1936 film by David Selman

- Directed by: David Selman
- Written by: Isadore Bernstein; Dalton Trumbo; Robert Watson
- Produced by: Kenneth J. Bishop
- Starring: Walter C. Kelly; Valerie Hobson; Edith Fellows
- Cinematography: William Beckway; William C. Thompson
- Edited by: William Austin
- Production companies: Kenneth J. Bishop Productions; Central Films
- Distributed by: Columbia Pictures
- Release date: October 15, 1936
- Running time: 66 minutes
- Countries: Canada; United States
- Language: English

Tugboat Princess is a 1936 American-Canadian drama film directed by David Selman and starring Walter C. Kelly, Valerie Hobson and Edith Fellows.

== Cast ==
- Walter C. Kelly as Captain Zack
- Valerie Hobson as Sally
- Edith Fellows as 'Princess' Judy
- Clyde Cook as Steve, the engineer
- Lester Matthews as 1st Mate Bob
- Reginald Hincks as Captain Darling
- Lou Callum as Policeman
- Stuart Clarke as Judy's Doctor
- George Hibbard as Owner of Davy Jones' Locker Restaurant
- Arthur Kerr as Loan Shark
- Arthur Legge-Willis as Loan Shark
- Ethel Reese-Burns as Mrs. Price

== Bibliography ==
- Mayer, Geoff. Guide to British Cinema. Greenwood Publishing Group, 2003.
