= Death Goes North =

- Directed by: Frank McDonald
- Written by: Edward R. Austin
- Produced by: Kenneth J. Bishop
- Starring: Edgar Edwards; Sheila Bromley; James McGrath
- Cinematography: Harry Forbes
- Edited by: William Austin
- Production company: Central Films
- Distributed by: Columbia Pictures
- Release date: July 1, 1939
- Running time: 64 minutes
- Countries: Canada; United States
- Language: English

Death Goes North is an American-Canadian Western film directed by Frank McDonald and starring Edgar Edwards, Sheila Bromley and James McGrath. The film was produced in spring of 1937, but released belatedly on July 1, 1939.

== Cast ==
- Edgar Edwards as Sgt. Ken Strange
- Sheila Bromley as Elsie Barlow
- James McGrath as Puffy Puffett
- Jameson Thomas as Robert Druid, alias Herbert Barlow
- Walter Byron as Al Norton
- Arthur Kerr as Bart Norton (Foreman)
- Dorothy Bradshaw as Martha Barlow
- Reginald Hincks as Freddy (the Old-Timer)
- Vivian Combe as Maggie
- Rin Tin Tin Jr. as King

== Bibliography ==
- Mike Gasher. Hollywood North: The Feature Film Industry in British Columbia. UBC Press, 2002.
