= Secret Patrol =

1936 film by David Selman

- Directed by: David Selman
- Written by: Peter B. Kyne; J.P. McGowan; Robert Watson
- Produced by: Kenneth J. Bishop
- Starring: Charles Starrett; Finis Barton; J.P. McGowan
- Cinematography: William Beckway; George Meehan
- Edited by: William Austin
- Production company: Central Films
- Distributed by: Columbia Pictures
- Release date: June 3, 1936
- Running time: 60 minutes
- Countries: Canada; United States
- Language: English

Secret Patrol is a 1936 American-Canadian Western film directed by David Selman and starring Charles Starrett, Finis Barton and J.P. McGowan. It was shot in Vancouver.

== Cast ==
- Charles Starrett as RCMP Cpl. Alan Craig
- Henry Mollison as Constable Gene Barkley
- Finis Barton as Jean
- J. P. McGowan as Blacksmith Barstow
- William Millman as C.J. McCord (as LeStrange Millman)
- James McGrath as Tim Arnold
- Arthur Kerr as Jordan
- Reginald Hincks as Superintendent Barkley

== Bibliography ==
- Mike Gasher. Hollywood North: The Feature Film Industry in British Columbia. UBC Press, 2002.
