= Woman Against the World =

1937 American film directed by David Selman

- Directed by: David Selman
- Written by: Edgar Edwards
- Produced by: Lew Golder; Kenneth J. Bishop
- Starring: Alice Moore; Edgar Edwards; Ralph Forbes
- Cinematography: Harry Forbes; William Beckway
- Edited by: William Austin
- Production company: Columbia Pictures
- Release date: May 6, 1937 (US)
- Running time: 66 minutes
- Country: United States
- Language: English

Woman Against the World is a 1937 Canadian/American melodrama film directed by David Selman and starring Alice Moore, Edgar Edwards, and Ralph Masters. The screenplay was written by Edgar Edwards. The film was released on May 6, 1937.

== Cast ==
- Alice Moore as Anna Masters
- Edgar Edwards as Johnny Masters
- Ralph Forbes as Larry Steele
- Collette Lyons as Patsy
- Sylvia Welsh as Betty Jane
- Ethel Reese-Burns as Aunt Frieda Plummer
- George Hallett as Mr. Plummer
- James McGrath as Detective James P. Flavin
- Grant MacDonald as Jimmy Daley
- Fred Bass as Prosecutor
- Harry Hay as Mr. Martin
- Enid Cole as Mrs. Martin
- Reginald Hincks as The judge
