= Guy Usher =

American actor (1883–1944)

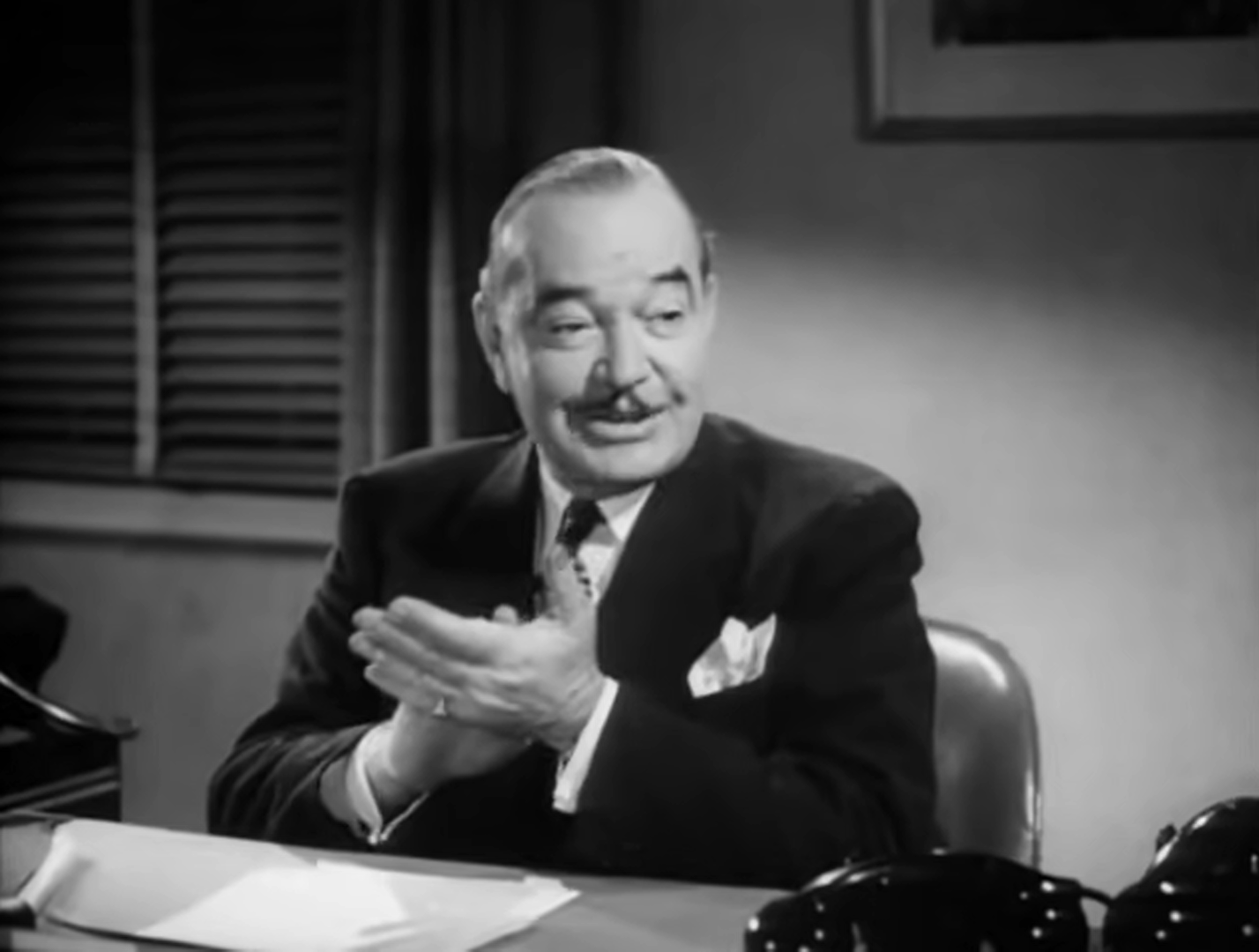
- Usher in The Devil Bat (1940)
- Born: James Guy Usher; May 9, 1883; Mason City, Iowa, U.S.
- Died: June 16, 1944 (aged 61); San Diego, California, U.S.
- Occupation: Actor
- Years active: 1932–1943

James Guy Usher (May 9, 1883 – June 16, 1944) was an American film actor. He appeared in more than 190 films between 1932 and 1943.

Born in Mason City, Iowa, Usher acted on stage before venturing into films. Billed as James Guy Usher, he often worked with the Echkhardt Players. In films, Usher often portrayed characters in business or industry.

Usher died of a heart attack in San Diego, California, at age 61.

== Selected filmography ==
- The Penguin Pool Murder (1932)
- Face in the Sky (1933)
- Fast Workers (1933)
- Hell Bent for Love (1934)
- It's a Gift (1934) as Harry Payne Bosterly
- Flirting with Danger (1934)
- Little Big Shot (1935)
- Grand Exit (1935)
- Justice of the Range (1935)
- Make a Million (1935)
- The Mystery Man (1935)
- Charlie Chan at the Opera (1936) as Inspector Regan
- The President's Mystery (1936)
- Postal Inspector (1936)
- Counsel for Crime (1937)
- Marked Woman (1937) as Detective Ferguson (uncredited)
- Crashing Through Danger (1938)
- Prison Break (1938)
- Buck Rogers (1939, Serial)
- Rough Riders' Round-up (1939)
- Wolf Call (1939)
- The Devil Bat (1940)
- Doomed to Die (1940)
- I Take This Oath (1940)
- Laughing at Danger (1940)
- Passport to Alcatraz (1940)
- Hold That Woman! (1940)
- Ridin' on a Rainbow (1941)
- King of the Zombies (1941)
- No Greater Sin (1941)
- West of Cimarron (1941)
- Borrowed Hero (1941)
- The Great Train Robbery (1941)
- Bells of Capistrano (1942)
- Lady for a Night (1942)
- Man from Cheyenne (1942)
- I Was Framed (1942)
- Sin Town (1942)
- The Affairs of Jimmy Valentine (1942)
- The Mummy's Tomb (1942)
- Lost Canyon (1942)
- The Avenging Rider (1943)
