= Innocence (1923 film) =

1923 film by Edward LeSaint

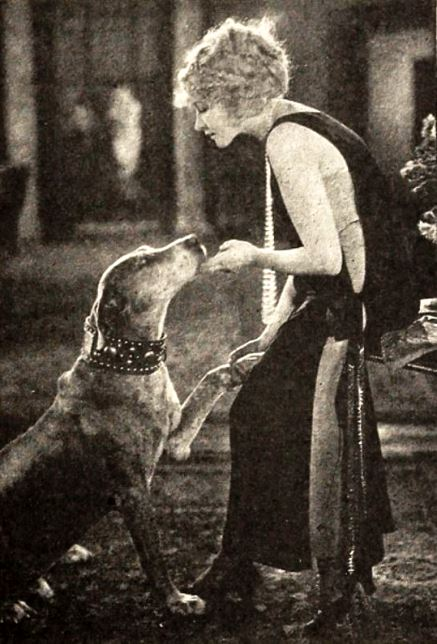
- Still with Nilsson and Teddy the dog
- Directed by: Edward J. Le Saint
- Written by: John Stone
- Produced by: Harry Cohn
- Starring: Anna Q. Nilsson
- Distributed by: CBC Film Sales Corporation
- Release date: December 1, 1923
- Running time: 58 minutes
- Country: United States
- Language: Silent (English intertitles)

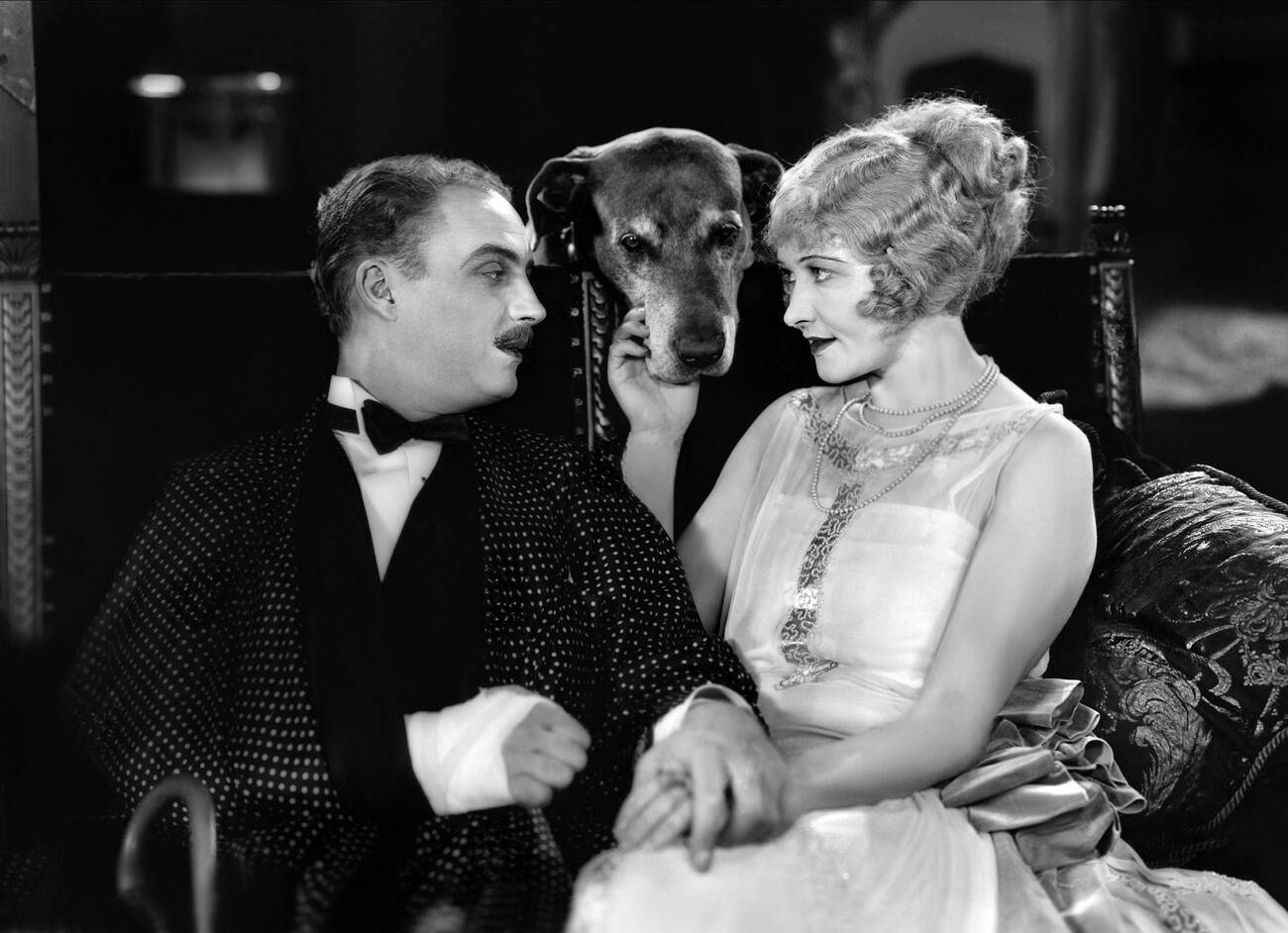
Scene from the film featuring Anna Q. Nilsson, Teddy the dog and Freeman Wood.

Innocence is a lost 1923 American silent drama film directed by Edward J. Le Saint and starring Anna Q. Nilsson. The film was released by the CBC Film Sales Corporation, which would later become Columbia Pictures.

== Plot ==
As described in a film magazine review, theater actress Fay Leslie weds Don Hampton, a wealthy society man. Don becomes jealous of Paul Atkins, an actor friend of Fay. Paul is convicted of a robbery of which he is innocent. He escapes from a prison work gang and, after fighting with the crew of a train, makes a daring jump from the train while it is crossing a high trestle bridge, diving into a swift flowing river. In the end he is aided by Fay. Because of compromising circumstances, Don believes that she has been faithless and employs a lawyer to seek a divorce. Fay visits the attorney and, through her clever acting, convinces him that she is guiltless and that circumstantial evidence should not be credited. After Paul clears her name, husband and wife are reconciled.

== Cast ==
- Anna Q. Nilsson as Fay Leslie
- Freeman Wood as Don Hampton
- Earle Foxe as Paul Atkins
- Wilfred Lucas as Collingwood
- William Scott as Publicity Agent
- Marion Harlan as Chorus Girl
- Lillian Langdon as Mrs. Hampton
- Vera Lewis as Wedding Guest (uncredited)
- Jessie Arnold as Wedding Guest (uncredited)
