= Forgive and Forget (1923 film) =

1923 film

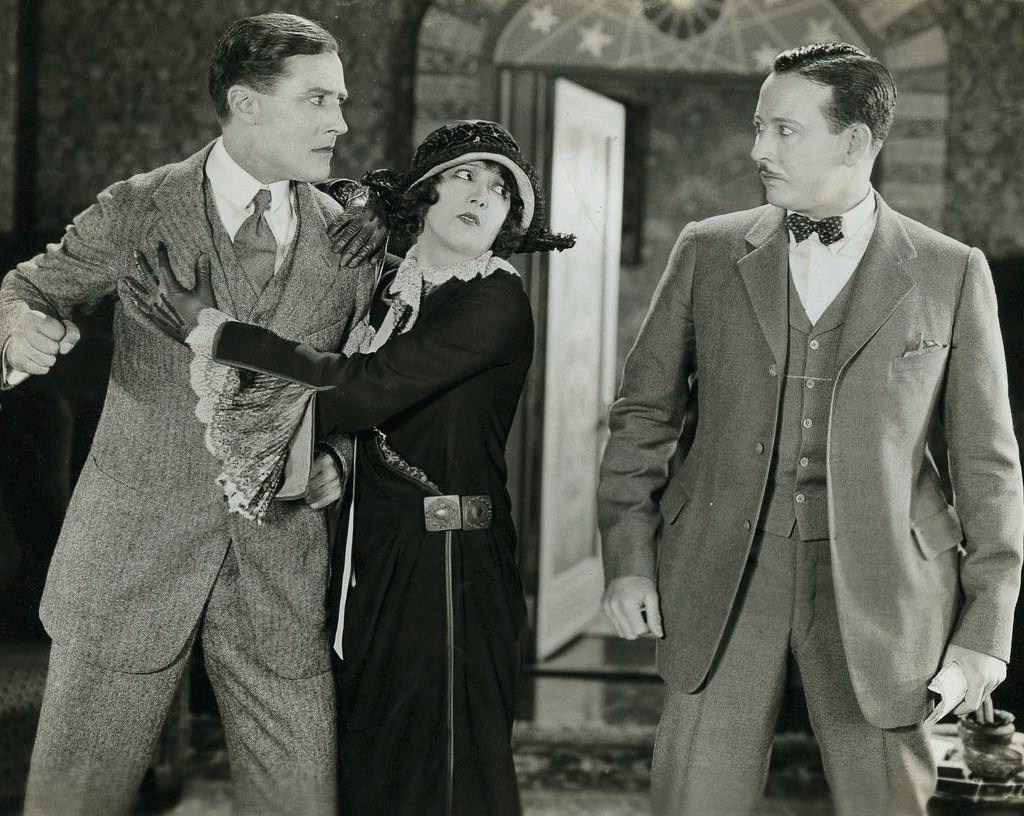
- Still with Vernon Steele, Estelle Taylor, and Philo McCullough
- Directed by: Howard M. Mitchell
- Written by: John Stone
- Story by: Charles Furthman
- Produced by: John Stone; Harry Cohn
- Starring: Estelle Taylor; Pauline Garon; Philo McCullough
- Cinematography: King D. Gray
- Production company: CBC Film Sales Corporation
- Distributed by: CBC Film Sales Corporation
- Release date: September 15, 1923
- Running time: 57 minutes
- Country: United States
- Language: Silent (English intertitles)

Forgive and Forget is a 1923 American silent mystery film directed by Howard M. Mitchell and starring Estelle Taylor, Pauline Garon, and Philo McCullough. It was made by the CBC Film Sales Corporation (which would later become Columbia Pictures) at the Sunset Gower Studios in Los Angeles.

== Plot ==
A woman (Taylor) having an affair is blackmailed by her lover's roommate (McCullough). When her lover (Steele) is founded dead, her husband (Standing) is then arrested for the murder.

== Cast ==
- Estelle Taylor as Mrs. Cameron
- Pauline Garon as Virginia Clark
- Philo McCullough as Blake
- Josef Swickard as John Standing
- Wyndham Standing as Mr. Cameron
- Raymond McKee as Dick Merrill
- Vernon Steele as Ronnie Sears
- Lionel Belmore as Butler

== Preservation ==
A print of Forgive and Forget with one reel missing is located in the George Eastman Museum Motion Picture Collection.

== Bibliography ==
- Dick, Bernard F. The Merchant Prince of Poverty Row: Harry Cohn of Columbia Pictures. University Press of Kentucky.
