= Only a Shop Girl =

1922 film

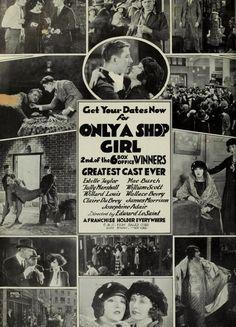
- Directed by: Edward LeSaint
- Written by: Edward LeSaint (scenario)
- Produced by: Harry Cohn
- Starring: Estelle Taylor; Mae Busch; Wallace Beery; William Scott; James Morrison; Josephine Adair
- Production company: CBC Film Sales Corporation
- Distributed by: CBC Film Sales Corporation
- Release date: December 15, 1922
- Running time: 68 minutes
- Country: United States
- Language: Silent (English intertitles)

Only a Shop Girl is a lost 1922 American silent drama film directed by Edward LeSaint and starring Estelle Taylor, Mae Busch, Wallace Beery, William Scott, James Morrison, and Josephine Adair. The film was released by the CBC Film Sales Corporation (which would later become Columbia Pictures) on December 15, 1922.

== Cast ==
- Estelle Taylor as Mame Mulvey
- Mae Busch as Josie Jerome
- Wallace Beery as Jim Brennan
- William Scott as Danny Mulvey
- James Morrison as Charles Black
- Josephine Adair as Angelina Jerome
- Willard Louis as James Watkins
- Claire Du Brey as Mrs. Watkins
- Tully Marshall as Watkins' Store Manager
