= More to Be Pitied Than Scorned =

1922 film by Edward LeSaint

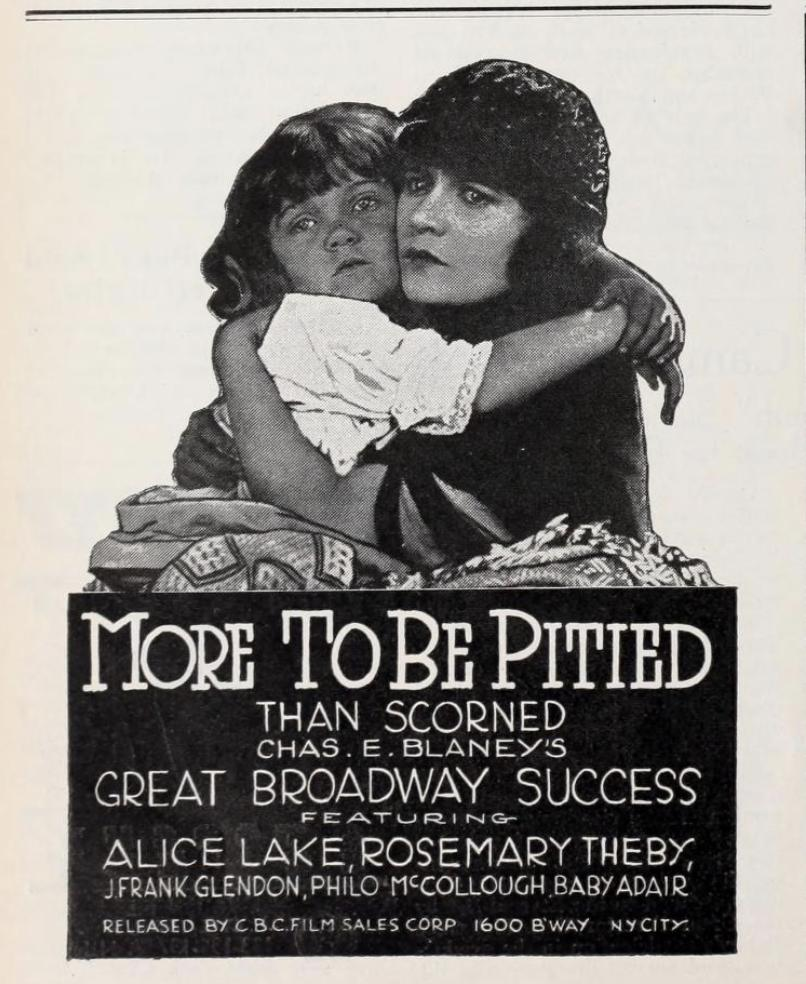
- Directed by: Edward LeSaint
- Written by: Charles E. Blaney (story)
- Produced by: Waldorf Pictures; Harry Cohn
- Starring: Alice Lake; Rosemary Theby
- Cinematography: King D. Gray; Gilbert Warrenton
- Distributed by: CBC Film Sales Corporation
- Release date: August 20, 1922
- Running time: 58 minutes; 6 reels
- Country: United States
- Language: Silent (English intertitles)
- Box office: $110,000

More to Be Pitied Than Scorned is a lost 1922 silent film melodrama starring Alice Lake and Rosemary Theby. It was directed by Edward LeSaint and produced by Harry Cohn.

It was the first feature film from CBC Film Sales Corporation, which was reorganized as Columbia Pictures, by brothers Harry and Jack Cohn and best friend Joe Brandt on January 10, 1924.

== Cast ==
- J. Frank Glendon – Julian Lorraine
- Rosemary Theby – Josephine Clifford
- Philo McCullough – Vincent Grant
- Gordon Griffith – Troubles
- Alice Lake – Viola Lorraine
- Josephine Adair – Ruth Lorraine
