= CBC Film Sales Corporation =

Former American film studio; predecessor to Columbia Pictures

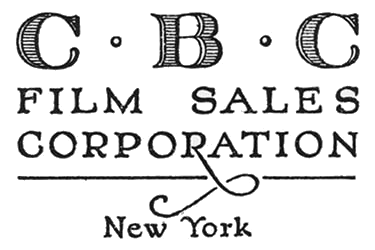
- Logo used from 1919 to 1924
- Type: Private
- Industry: Film
- Predecessor: Independent Moving Pictures
- Founded: June 19, 1918; 108 years ago
- Founders: Harry and Jack Cohn; Joe Brandt
- Defunct: January 10, 1924; 102 years ago
- Fate: Renamed as Columbia Pictures
- Successor: Columbia Pictures
- Key people: Harry Cohn (President)
- Products: Motion pictures

Cohn-Brandt-Cohn (CBC) Film Sales Corporation (also known as CBC Film Sales or simply CBC) was an American film studio that was founded on June 19, 1918 by brothers Harry and Jack Cohn and their friend and co-worker at Independent Moving Pictures (later became Universal Film Manufacturing Company), Joe Brandt, with capital of $250 ($3451 in 2024 dollars). The headquarters were at 1600 Broadway in New York.

Brandt was the president of CBC Film Sales, handling sales, marketing and distribution from New York along with Jack Cohn, while Harry Cohn ran production in Hollywood. CBC Film's early productions were low-budget short subjects: Screen Snapshots (started in 1920), the "Hall Room Boys" (the vaudeville duo of Edward Flanagan and Neely Edwards), and the Chaplin imitator Billy West. The start-up CBC leased space in a Poverty Row studio at 6070 Sunset Boulevard in 1922. The studio released its first feature film More to Be Pitied Than Scorned on August 20, 1922. Its success led the company to open its own film exchanges.

Among Hollywood's elite, the studio's small-time reputation led some to joke that "CBC" stood for "Corned Beef and Cabbage". The studio's last film to be released was Innocence on December 1, 1923. The Cohn brothers changed the name of CBC Film Sales to Columbia Pictures on January 10, 1924, with a view toward improving its image.

== Filmography ==
Release date	Title
August 20, 1922	More to Be Pitied Than Scorned
December 15, 1922	Only a Shop Girl
March 1, 1923	Temptation
April 16, 1923	Her Accidental Husband
August 15, 1923	Mary of the Movies (co-produced with FBO)
August 15, 1923	The Barefoot Boy
August 15, 1923	Yesterday's Wife
September 15, 1923	Forgive and Forget
October 25, 1923	The Marriage Market
December 1, 1923	Innocence
