= Temptation (1923 film) =

1923 film by Edward LeSaint

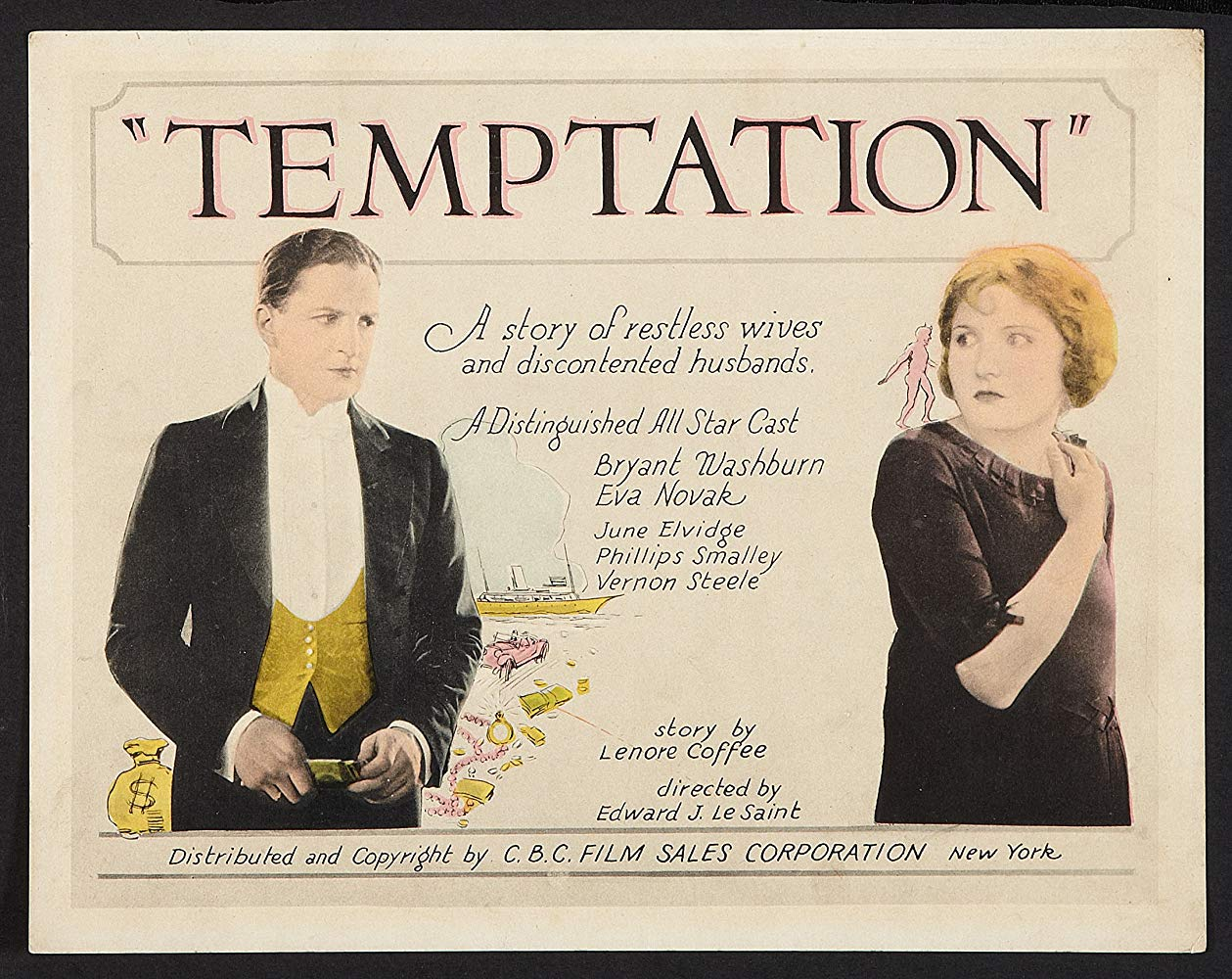
- Lobby card
- Directed by: Edward LeSaint
- Written by: Lenore Coffee
- Starring: Bryant Washburn; Eva Novak; June Elvidge
- Cinematography: King D. Gray
- Production company: CBC Film Sales Corporation
- Distributed by: CBC Film Sales Corporation
- Release date: March 1, 1923
- Running time: 65 minutes
- Country: United States
- Language: Silent (English intertitles)

Temptation is a 1923 American silent drama film directed by Edward LeSaint and starring Bryant Washburn, Eva Novak, and June Elvidge. The film was released by the CBC Film Sales Corporation, which would later become Columbia Pictures.

== Cast ==
- Bryant Washburn as Jack Baldwin
- Eva Novak as Marjorie Baldwin
- June Elvidge as Mrs. Martin
- Phillips Smalley as Frederick Arnold
- Vernon Steele as John Hope

== Preservation and status ==
The film survives in its complete form in a 16mm copy held at the Deutsche Kinemathek in Berlin.

== Bibliography ==
- Dick, Bernard F. The Merchant Prince of Poverty Row: Harry Cohn of Columbia Pictures. University Press of Kentucky, 2015.
