= Her Accidental Husband =

1923 film

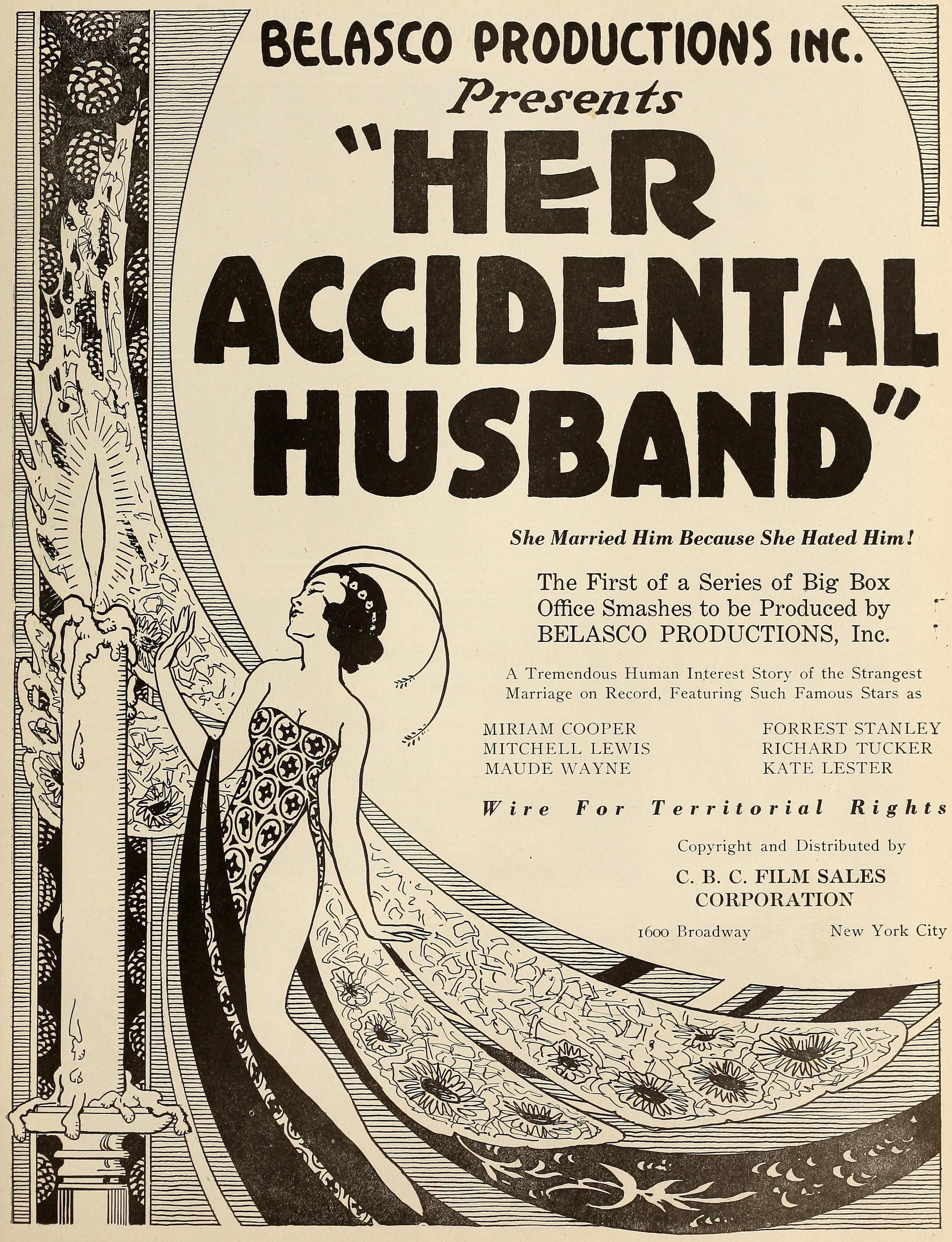
- Trade advertisement
- Directed by: Dallas M. Fitzgerald
- Written by: Lois Zellner
- Starring: Miriam Cooper; Forrest Stanley; Mitchell Lewis
- Production company: Belasco Productions
- Distributed by: CBC Film Sales Corporation
- Release date: April 16, 1923
- Running time: 63 minutes
- Country: United States
- Language: Silent (English intertitles)

Her Accidental Husband is a 1923 American silent romance film directed by Dallas M. Fitzgerald and starring Miriam Cooper, Forrest Stanley, and Mitchell Lewis. It was released by the CBC Film Sales Corporation, which would later become Columbia Pictures.

== Cast ==
- Miriam Cooper as Rena Goring
- Forrest Stanley as Gordon Gray
- Mitchell Lewis as Old Blind Goring
- Richard Tucker as Paul Dupré
- Kate Lester as Mrs. Gray
- Maude Wayne as Vera Hampton

== Preservation and status ==
A 35mm copy of the film is held at the Cinémathèque québécoise in Canada.

== Bibliography ==
- Munden, Kenneth White. The American Film Institute Catalog of Motion Pictures Produced in the United States, Part 1. University of California Press, 1997.
