= Chas. H. Hansen Music Corp. =

American music publishing company

- Status: Defunct
- Founded: 1952
- Founder: Charles Henry Hansen
- Country of origin: United States
- Headquarters location: Miami Beach, Florida
- Publication types: Sheet music
- Official website: hansenhousemusic.com

Chas. H. Hansen Music Corp. was an American music publisher founded by Charles Henry Hansen (1913–1995) in 1952 and incorporated in New York. Its music covered a broad spectrum of genres that included classical (opera, orchestra, band, choral, chamber, and solo), jazz, folk, rock, country, popular, educational — and music text books. Chas. H. Hansen Music Corp. was the exclusive U.S. publisher and distributor of Beatles sheet music starting in 1964. In the 1980s, Hansen Music shifted its focus from popular music to classical and jazz method books. In 1980, Hansen Music operated seven retail sheet music stores located in San Francisco, Seattle, and Las Vegas. Hansen Music ceased operations in December 1991, and its musical catalog was acquired by Alfred Publications.

== History ==
=== Initial incorporation ===
The firm — incorporated on December 11, 1952, by Charles Henry Hansen — was the outgrowth of an earlier proprietorship founded by Hansen in 1946 named the Charles Hansen Music Company. Hansen was the sole owner of both firms and was also the owner of Ethel Smith Music Corporation, a New York corporation founded in 1949 and dissolved in 1991. Hansen formed several partnerships with artists and other publishers, mostly for the purpose of distributing folios of hits.

=== Folio reprint business ===
By 1950, Hansen Music had become an influential music folio reprinter of hit music of other publishers — a growing niche market that had been dominated by larger firms. The Hansen folios included simplified scoring of popular music for elementary piano, uke, trumpet, clarinet, saxophone, accordion, trombone, Western quartets, sacred choir, and barbershop quartets.

The publishing of sheet music, single and folio, had become a near monopoly by a few large companies. The youngest, founded in 1971 by a longtime protégé of Charles Hansen, Frank Hackinson, was Screen Gems—Columbia Publications. The others were Charles Hansen Publications, Warner Brothers Music, and the oldest, Big Three Music, owned by United Artists. Working out of fully equipped and self-contained facilities in Florida, with staffs and arrangers, Screen Gems and Hansen accounted for about two-thirds of the industry's $140 million annual retail gross sales. A fundamental difference between Screen Gems and Hansen was that Screen–Gems mostly owned the copyrights to the music of its folios, whereas Hansen mostly licensed the copyrights.

Early on, in 1954, Hansen Music acquired the Caribbean Music Catalog from publisher Joe Davis (1896–1978), containing 500 tunes, of which, 150 were published. However, it is unclear whether the deal was done as an acquisition or a license.

On May 20, 1971, the firm changed its name to Charles Hansen Music & Books, Inc. The firm became inactive December 24, 1991. The larger part of the Charles Hansen catalog was acquired by Warner Brothers Publications, then subsequently sold to Alfred Publications. According to Billboard in 1972, Wometco, headed by Mitchell Wolfson, had a pending offer to acquire Hansen, retaining Hansen and his staff.

Hansen House Music Publishers — a Florida registered fictitious name of Hansen Publications, Inc. — became inactive December 31, 2009, and the associated Hansen House web page is now inactive as of 2018, having been parked as early as late 2013.

=== Licensed Fake Books ===
Hansen Music was the first to delve deeply into published legal fake books that had enough songs for serious musicians. Fake books published:

1. 1001 Jumbo Song Book (1972); OCLC 21513087

Revised (1977); OCLC 3472769

2. 1003 Greatest Song Book: The Star Performer Song Book of Show Tunes & Movie Themes (1977); OCLC 3943528
3. The 666 Popular fake song book (Books 1 & 2) (1967); OCLC 8130743
4. Real Fake Book: For All Popular Instruments: 202 Popular Songs, Combo Style (1966); OCLC 79944608

The publishing of fully-licensed fake books by Hansen Music and others, starting in the 1970s, was novel. Prior to this, many musicians relied on unlicensed (illegally published) fake books when performing with ad-hoc musical groups for local jazz gigs or social occasions like weddings. However, the shift to licensed fake books started by Hansen Music took several decades, as the real book (an unlicensed and illegally distributed fake book that first appeared in the mid-1970s) was widely used by musicians until a fully-licensed version published by Hal Leonard finally appeared in 2004.

== Divisions & locations ==
At one time, the corporation had offices in Chicago, St. Louis, Seattle, Los Angeles, Dallas, and New York City, but none remained open as long as the headquarters in New York, located on the 6th floor of a building at 119 West 57th Street, New York City, two doors west of Steinway Hall and on the same block, across the street and east of Carnegie Hall. When the Hansen corporation began to grow, it needed more warehouse space, and later moved to the first floor of the same building. This was the main headquarters until 1958, when it moved to Miami Beach, Florida. The 57th Street building, still standing, is a 16-story structure designed by Emery Roth and completed in 1927.

- Hansen Distributing Corporation, a New York corporation formed September 4, 1951

Hansen Publications, Inc., new name as of 1 February 1952 – administrative dissolution 25 September 2009 (Florida)
Inter-Company Publications, Inc., new name as of 27 February 1981 – rendered inactive 16 September 2005 (Florida)

1949–1953: Walter Beeler, wind ensemble composer, served as executive editor and staff composer
1953–1966: Alfred Reed, wind ensemble composer, served as executive editor and staff composer

- Hanlit Publications, Inc., a New York corporation formed January 5, 1966

On January 5, 1966, Hansen became partners with composer and music executive Ervin Litkei (1921–2000), forming "Hanlit Publications, Inc.," which became well known for having been the sole U.S. publisher and distributor of Beatles sheet music, beginning 1966.

- Charles Hansen Educational Music and Books, Inc. ("and" spelled out vs. "&")
- Charles Hansen Productions, Inc.
- Music Retailers Service, Inc.
- Hansen House

1820 West Avenue
Miami Beach, Florida

== Notable staff members ==
Composers

- Walter Beeler (1909–1973), director of bands (conductor) and professor of at Ithaca College, had been a staff editor of concert band music for Hansen Music until 1956. On his recommendation, Hansen hired Alfred Reed in January 1953 as staff composer.
- Alfred Reed, composer
- John Edmondson, composer, education editor from 1970 to 1979

Sales

- Lionel Job (born 1942), sales
- Frank Hackinson (né Francis J. Hackinson; born 1927), also a composer, worked for Hansen Publications from 1954 to 1971

== Charles Hansen ==
In 1941, Hansen was the sales manager of Mercer & Morris (Edwin H. Morris). When Mercer & Morris acquired White-Smith Music Publishing Company in 1941, Hansen assumed the same role at White-Smith. In the 1930s, Hansen was a traveling song-plugger for Mills Music.

== Family ==
Charles Hansen was married to Isabel McGehee Hood (1914–2003). They had a son, Charles H. Hansen, Jr. (born 1954), and two daughters, Susan Marie Isabel Hansen and Kathleen Florence Hansen (1949–2009). Susan is married to Michael Stanton Jeffries, the former CEO of Abercrombie & Fitch Co.

In 1951 Hansen purchased the home of John Reed King at 4 North Drive, Malba, Queens.
