= Jack Cohn =

American film producer

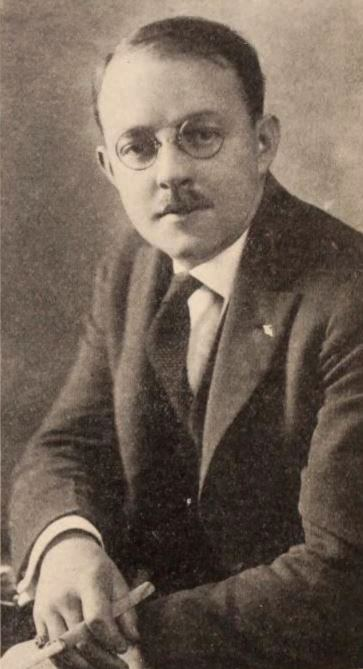
- Born: Jacob Cohn; October 27, 1889; New York State, U.S.
- Died: December 8, 1956 (aged 67); New York City, U.S.
- Occupations: Film producer and executive vice president of Columbia Pictures Corporation
- Years active: 1908–1956
- Spouse: Jeanette Lesser
- Children: 3
- Relatives: Harry Cohn (brother); Leonore Annenberg (niece)

Jacob Cohn (October 27, 1889 – December 8, 1956) known as Jack Cohn, was an American film producer and executive, who was the co-founder of Columbia Pictures Corporation.

== Early life ==
Cohn was born in New York, the son of Joseph, a Jewish tailor from Germany, and Bella, from Russia. He had three brothers, Maxwell (1888–1948), Harry (born 1891), and Nathan (born 1900), and a sister Anna (born 1897).

He left school at 13 and joined the Hampton Advertising Agency as an errand boy, where he worked for six years.

== Career ==
In 1908, he became a laboratory assistant at Carl Laemmle's Independent Moving Pictures. He also became involved in editing and printing. He focused on newsreels and became editor and producer of Universal Weekly and established bureaus in key cities to provide the news. In 1913, he was placed in charge of production at IMP's studio at Tenth Avenue and 59th Street. His younger brother Harry was now also working for IMP and together they made their first film, Traffic in Souls (1913).

In 1919, the Cohn brothers joined forces with fellow IMP employee Joe Brandt and went on to found CBC Film Sales Corporation. They started making short films with the Screen Snapshots series starting in 1920 and made the company's first feature film, More to Be Pitied Than Scorned (1922). Following its success, they opened their own film exchanges. In 1924, they renamed the company Columbia Pictures.

Jack became supervisor of the New York office in charge of sales, while Harry moved to California to oversee the studio operations. Brandt stayed in New York with Jack. Jack became executive vice-president, heading the distribution organization that included Nathan B. Spingold and Abe Schneider (father of Bert Schneider).

Over the years, there were power struggles between Jack and Harry with the two not speaking to each other for months. In 1932, Jack attempted to oust Harry but failed, with Brandt resigning and selling his third of the company to Harry, who took over as president, consolidating his power.

== Personal life ==
Cohn married Jeanette Lesser and they had three sons: Ralph, Robert and Joseph Curtis. Ralph (1914–1959) founded Screen Gems, a Columbia subsidiary. Robert worked for Columbia's Paris office and became a production executive in Hollywood. Joseph Curtis died in 1954 at the age of 32.

In 1939, Cohn founded the Motion Picture Pioneers, an organization for men who had served in the industry for more than 25 years. The Foundation of the Motion Picture Pioneers provided aid to the members.

== Death ==
Cohn was admitted to the Midtown Hospital in early December 1956 for minor surgery and died of a pulmonary embolism on December 8, 1956.
