= Hallroom Boys =

Comedy short film series

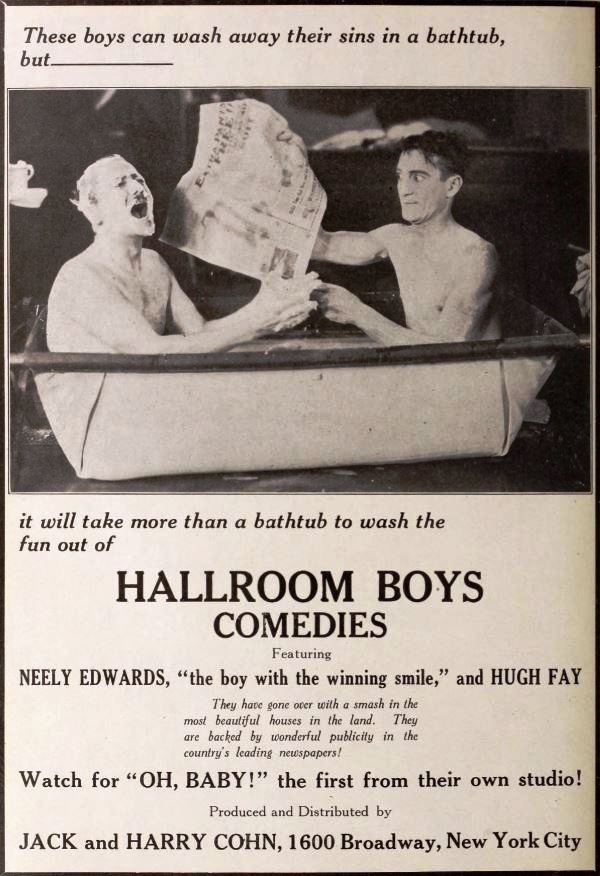
1920 advertisement with Neely Edwards and Hugh Fay

Hallroom Boys, also sometimes written as Hall-Room Boys or Hall Room Boys, was a comic strip, vaudeville act, and a comedy short film series that included various actors, including Edward Flanagan, Neely Edwards, and Sid Smith. Pathescope reissued the films in Europe.

== Filmography ==
- Taming the West (1919)
