= Frank Hackinson =

Music publisher (1927–2021)

Francis J. Hackinson (July 7, 1927 – February 6, 2021) was an American music publisher who was the CEO and president of Columbia Pictures Publications. He was hired as vice president and general manager in June 1971, when Columbia Pictures Industries, Inc., formed the division in Miami. He was promoted to president in July 1981. Hackinson is widely credited with elevating Columbia Pictures Publications — in the music print field — to a preeminent market position, according to Robert L. Stone, former executive at Columbia Pictures.

== Career highlights ==
Hackinson worked for Chas. H. Hansen Music Corp. from 1954 to 1971 in all phases of the music print business. Hackinson was hired as a staff composer. In one of his other phases, he was general manager in charge of licensing and acquisitions. He also negotiated the first print deal in the United States for Beatles songs.

== Family ==
In 1963, Frank Hackinson divorced Barbara in Miami, Florida.
