= Ervin Litkei =

Hungarian-American composer and music executive (1921-2000)

- Born: 1921; Budapest, Hungary
- Died: February 8, 2000 (aged 78–79); Manhattan, New York City, United States
- Occupations: Music Executive, Composer
- Known for: composer of patriotic marches
- Spouse: Andrea Litkei

Ervin Litkei (19 December 1921 – 8 February 2000) was a Hungarian American composer and music executive who spent most of his career in the United States. He wrote marches dedicated to every US president since Franklin D. Roosevelt.

== Early life ==
He was born in Budapest in 1921. His mother was a successful songwriter. Litkei studied at the Music Conservatory of Hungary. He also studied architecture at the University of Hungary. He worked as an architect and journalist in Budapest after World War II.

== United States ==
He moved in 1948 to Hollywood where he worked for several years. He was going to return to Hungary when he met Andrea Fodor in New York. The two were married and stayed in New York.

Litkei wrote songs for film and translated lyrics of American hit songs into Hungarian. He met record producer Ethel Gabriel who introduced him to Eli Oberstein, the chief of RCA Victor at the time. Oberstein taught him the music business and treated him like a son.

== Musical Compositions ==
=== Marches ===
His first tribute march to a US president ("The Franklin D. Roosevelt March") was written when he was still in Hungary.

Some of his marches were played at inaugural ceremonies (including those for Lyndon Johnson and George Bush). For President Bill Clinton, he composed a march for him as well as a march for the First Lady (the first ever composed for a First Lady).

"The Captured 50" was a tribute. It was written for the hostages held in the US Embassy in Tehran. Representative Richard T. Schulze of Pennsylvania submitted the lyrics of the composition to the Congressional Record.

=== Other Compositions ===
Litkei also wrote and recorded Hungarian versions of Christmas songs and popular music songs.

In 1994–95, he composed music for a ballet, A Ballet of Our Times. Music was performed by the London Philharmonic and London Symphony Orchestras. The ballet dancers were from the Bolshoi Ballet and Moscow Choreographic Theater Ballet of Russia.

He and his wife made a $10,000 donation to the Songwriters' Hall of Fame to establish a scholarship fund: Best march or patriotic song composed by a high school student from New York.

== Music business ==
He found success in selling classical music wholesale. He founded Arovox Record Corporation, which sold $30 million of records, cassettes and music books to department stores such as Sears and Woolworths. He sold Arovox in 1989 for $11 million.

On January 5, 1966, Litkei partnered with Chas. H. Hansen Music Corp. to form Hanlit Publications. Hanlit became well known for being the sole U.S. publisher and distributor of Beatles sheet music starting in 1966.

Other companies he founded included: Olympia Record Industries, Galiko Music and Film Enterprises, Leona Music Publishing, Jade Panther Corporation of America, JazzMania Records, and Aurora Records.

In 1982, he hosted a concert at the Lincoln Center with Benny Goodman performing. The concert was to honor hospitalized American war veterans.

In 1989, he produced an off-broadway play called Two Aunts.

== Personal life ==
His wife, Andrea Fodor, was a poet, lyricist and former ballerina. She wrote lyrics for some of his compositions. His daughter, Dr. Cathy Litkei Greene, is married to musician Jeff Greene, who recorded under the Aurora label.
