= Screen Snapshots =

Film series

Screen Snapshots are a series of documentary short subjects featuring movie-related public events and behind-the-scenes glimpses of moviemaking, with appearances by current and former movie stars. The series was produced by Columbia Pictures and its antecedents from 1920 to 1958.

== History ==
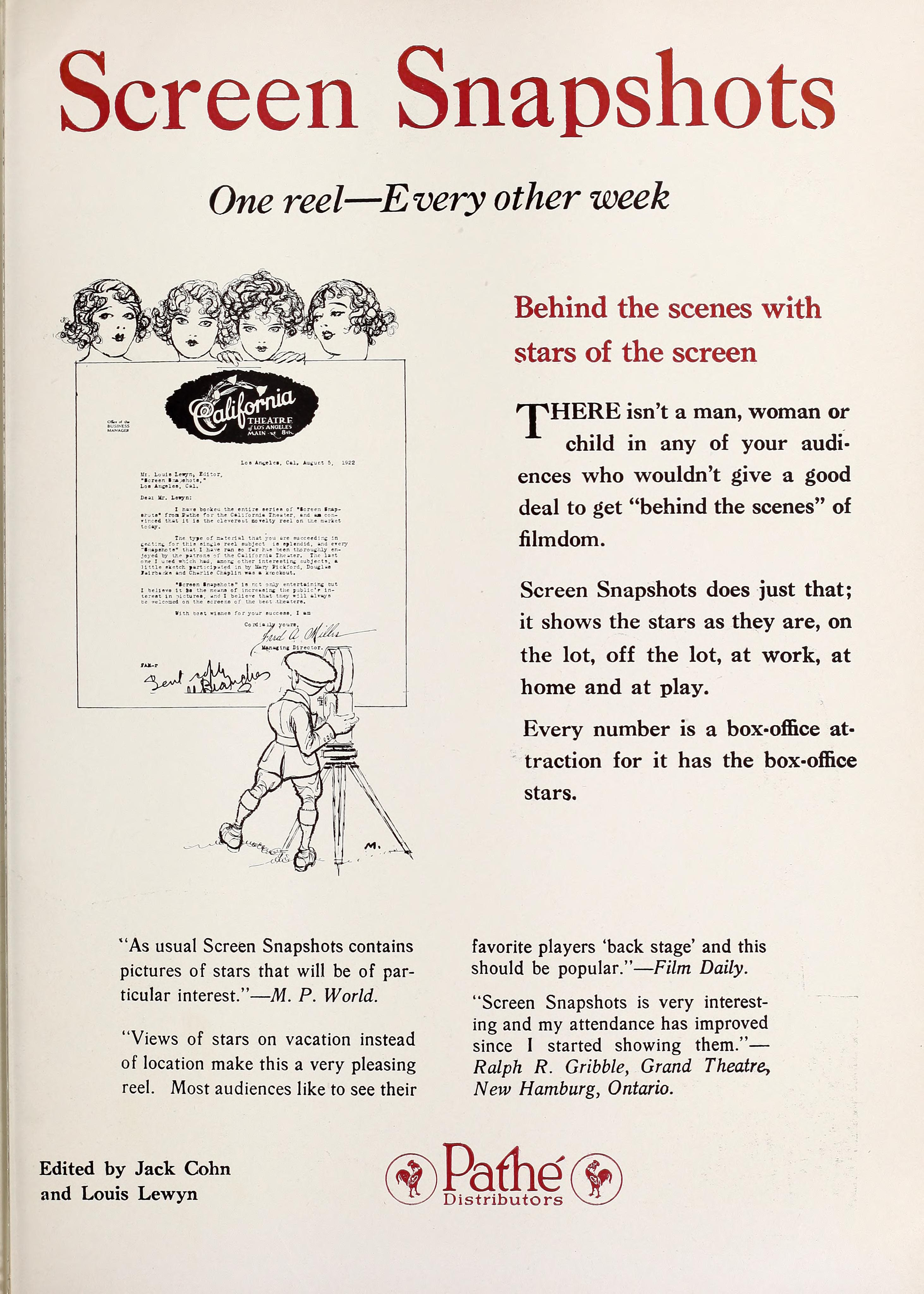
Screen Snapshots advertisement to exhibitors, 1922

In 1920, Jack Cohn, brother of future Columbia president Harry Cohn, wanted to make one-reel films showing the social life of Hollywood. While Harry considered himself in charge of everything the company made, it was Jack's project and he brought in Louis Lewyn to coproduce.

Jack Cohn and Louis Lewyn set up Screen Snapshots, Inc. and began production in May 1920. The shorts were distributed first through Pathe Exchange (1920-1924), then by the Cohn brothers' own C-B-C company, which became Columbia Pictures (1925-1958).

Louis Lewyn left Screen Snapshots in 1929 to produce a new series, in sound: The Voice of Hollywood, released by the independent Tiffany Pictures. Writer-director-cameraman Ralph Staub took over Screen Snapshots until 1933 when Harriet Parsons, daughter of influential gossip columnist Louella Parsons, joined Columbia. Harry Cohn entrusted the production of Screen Snapshots to her. Parsons continued the series until 1940, when she left Columbia to make a similar series about moviemaking, Meet the Stars, for Republic Pictures.

After Parsons moved on, Harry Cohn assigned staff producer Hugh McCollum to oversee the series, with Ralph Staub returning to the series as director. In 1943 Staub became both producer and director, and he devoted himself to Screen Snapshots for the next 15 years. Each reel was hosted by a celebrity, who would introduce the topic and narrate the location footage.

== Production ==
In 1946 Ralph Staub explained how he worked with the stars: "If you make your reels novel and refreshing enough to interest your subjects as well as the prospective audience, you'll find them a lot more cooperative. It's important, too, to get your scenes quickly and with as little fuss and bother as possible. I always plan my shooting in order to save the stars' time and make it as easy for them as I can. I've even called in the players' favorite makeup men or hairdressers, so they would be confident of looking their best for the camera. When I promised Marlene Dietrich and Jack Benny that they could see the completed reels in which they appeared, I made very sure that they did view it before release." Although Staub had made his reputation as a one-man production crew, lighting, photographing, and directing films himself, his Columbia setup typically involved a staff of 20 people: four on the camera crew, five on the sound crew, two electricians, two grips, one assistant director, one makeup artist, one hairdresser, and four drivers. Columbia, seeing increased demand for the series, raised the number of film prints from 60 per subject to 125.

In the 1950s, when budgets were lowered for short-subject production, Staub would save time and money by hosting the films himself, and would consult his film library for old footage that he could fit into his new productions. For example, an untitled 1940 reel (Series 21, No. 1) emceed by Ken Murray and covering a gay-nineties-themed party, was recycled for Staub's 1951 reel Hollywood Pie Throwers. Certain of the Screen Snapshots reels received special attention (and custom-made promotional accessories) when they featured exceptionally popular stars. Hollywood Fun Festival (1952) covered the appearances of Martin and Lewis at the opening of Lewis's camera shop in Los Angeles, and at other Hollywood functions. "With Dean Martin and Jerry Lewis as the lure, this can be sold. This is exploitable to the hilt," advised the trade paper The Exhibitor. Theater owners could post the stars' names on the marquee and outside the theater without having to pay feature-film prices.

By 1956 Ralph Staub was working with all-time-low budgets, and resorted to more old film and even promotional announcements. The Exhibitor took pointed notice of this trend. Reviewing Fabulous Hollywood (1956): "Ralph Staub is shown with Jack Carson in Las Vegas where Carson gets in a plug for his hotel and engagement, after which Staub resurrects some old footage [from 1941's Screen Snapshots No. 9] showing Jack Benny celebrating an early anniversary in radio." Appraising Mr. Rhythm's Holiday (1956): "Dusting off some footage lying around [from 1952's Meet Mr. Rhythm, Frankie Laine], Ralph Staub tells Peter Lawford and Las Vegas hotel proprietor Wilbur Clark all about Frankie Laine's entry into the antique business and how he and his wife had a regular premiere for the opening of the store. There are commercial plugs all over the place until it becomes uncomfortable." Staub himself was uncomfortable with having to cut corners so often, and came to Harry Cohn with an idea to rejuvenate the Screen Snapshots.

== New approach ==
Columbia discontinued almost all of its short-subject series in 1956, but Harry Cohn made an exception for Screen Snapshots because it was the oldest series still in production and he was proud of its longevity. Staub proposed filming the shorts in color, and this marketable novelty kept the series going for two more years. It also did away with the repetition of older footage, and gave the series a fresher, contemporary look. Columbia introduced a Screen Snapshots "Guess Who?" contest, in which audience members could identify masked actors and win a free trip to Hollywood.

Ralph Staub attended many local functions where movie stars congregated: the Ice Capades (Hollywood Glamour on Ice, 1957), an all-star party in Walter Winchell's honor (The Walter Winchell Party, 1957), a fan-magazine awards ceremony (Meet the Photoplay Winners, 1957), Hollywood parties (Salute to Hollywood and Hollywood Star Festival, both 1958), and a rodeo (Rock 'em Cowboy, 1958), among others. The new, color Screen Snapshots took on an improvised, "live television" look, as The Exhibitor observed when screening The Mocambo Party (1957): "Ralph Staub sticks a microphone in the faces of celebrities and makes with nonsensical comments as they enter the Mocambo [nightclub] for a cocktail party."

Staub proudly stated, "I don't have any contract. Every Christmas I just go up and shake hands with Harry Cohn. Then I'm all set for another year's work!" Cohn died in February 1958; had he lived longer, Screen Snapshots would almost certainly have continued. The last film in the series was Glamorous Hollywood (released June 26, 1958, after Cohn's death), with Staub and crew setting up cameras at a charity function hosted by Jane Russell.

== Awards ==
Three of these documentary shorts were nominated for an Academy Award, Best Short Subject, One-reel, all produced by Staub. They are:

- Screen Snapshots Series 23, No. 1: Hollywood in Uniform (1944)
- Screen Snapshots' 50th Anniversary of Motion Pictures (1945)
- Screen Snapshots' 25th Anniversary|Screen Snapshots Series 25, No. 1: 25th Anniversary (1946)
