= Joe Brandt =

American publicist, screenwriter, editor, film producer (1882–1939)

- Born: Joseph Bradenburg; July 20, 1882; Troy, New York, U.S.
- Died: February 22, 1939 (aged 56); New York City, U.S.
- Occupations: Film producer; publicist; screenwriter; editor; general manager
- Years active: 1909–1936
- Known for: co-founder of Columbia Pictures

Joe Brandt (born Joseph Brandenburg, July 20, 1882 – February 22, 1939) was an American publicist, screenwriter, editor, film producer, and general manager. He co-founded Columbia Pictures with Harry and Jack Cohn.

== Biography ==
Brandt was born as Joseph Bradenburg in Troy, New York, USA to Jewish parents, Daniel and Rosa Brandenburg.

After obtaining a law degree from New York University and being admitted to the New York bar association in 1906, Brandt spent seven years working for Hampton's Advertising Agency. He later worked at The Player as manager of the New York office of Billboard; and as the advertising manager of the Dramatic Mirror.

In 1912, he was hired to be a member of Carl Laemmle's executive staff at Independent Moving Pictures, a few months before it merged to become Universal Film Manufacturing Company. At IMP, he worked with Harry and Jack Cohn. Jack Cohn had also worked at Hampton's Advertising Agency. Brandt was reported to have suggested renaming the National Board of Censorship to the National Board of Review, and was one of the founding members of the Associated Motion Picture Advertisers. In 1919, he left Universal and joined the National Film Corporation, then in 1920, he left National and became one of the founding members of CBC Film Sales with Harry and Jack Cohn, which evolved into Columbia Pictures Corporation.

After leaving Columbia and selling his interest to Harry in 1932, Brandt worked briefly for several different firms before retiring in 1935 due to Follicular lymphoma. Brandt died of lymphoma on February 22, 1939. Brandt's son and grandson also worked in the film industry. Jerrold T. Brandt was a film producer, most notable for the production of the Scattergood Baines film series in the early 1940s, and Jerrold T. Brandt Jr., Joe Brandt's grandson, produced the 1979 film The Bell Jar.
