= Edward Flanagan (actor) =

- Born: August 15, 1880; St. Louis, U.S.
- Died: August 18, 1925 (aged 45); Hollywood, U.S.
- Years active: 1900–1925
- Spouse: Charlotte Ravenscroft
- Children: 2

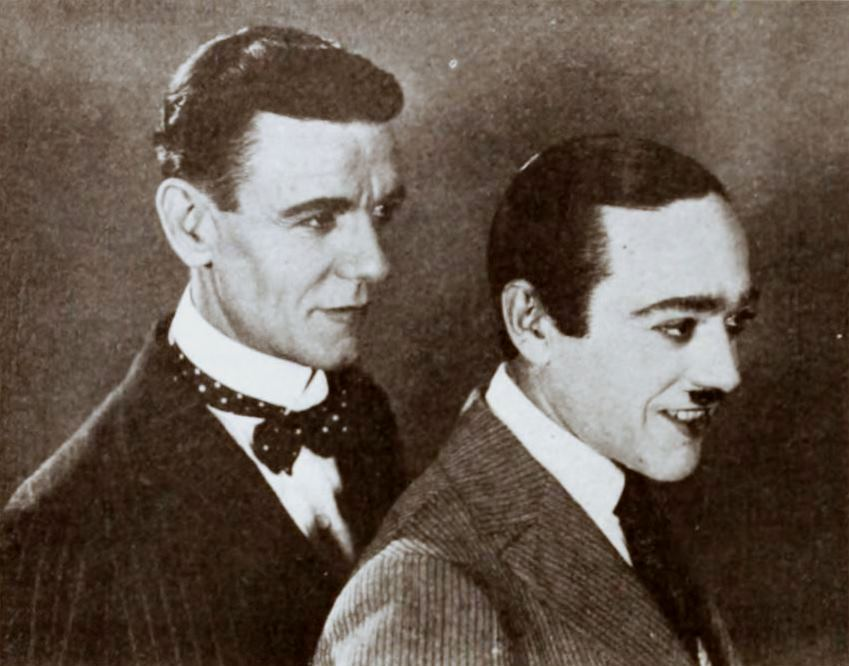
Edward Flanagan and Neely Edwards

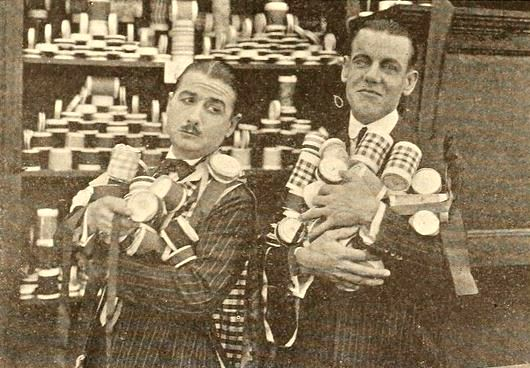
Edwards (left) and Flanagan in the short film comedy "Hall Room Boys"

Edward Flanagan, sometimes spelled Edward Flannigan (1880 – August 18, 1925), was a comedic actor in vaudeville and American films. He was part of a popular vaudeville duo with Neely Edwards.

Flanagan was a native of St. Louis, Missouri. In 1900, he teamed up with Edwards and they toured the U.S. performing the show titled On and Off. They also starred in the musical farce Up in the Air. They ceased performing vaudeville houses in 1921 but returned in 1924.

The comedy team starred together on screen in a series of Hallroom Boys Comedies, adapted from the comic strip, and again for National Film Corporation in "Flanagan and Edwards" shorts.

His wife also worked in vaudeville under the name Charlotte Ravenscroft. They had a son and a daughter. Their son Edward Flanagan, also became an actor, known in film as Dennis O'Keefe.

Flanagan was performing at the Metropolitan Theatre on August 13, 1925, and was taken ill and rushed to Hollywood Hospital. He had an operation for stomach ulcers and developed peritonitis and died on August 18, 1925.
