= Columbia Pictures =

American film production and distribution company

Columbia Pictures Industries, Inc.
- Print logo used since 1993
- Trade name: Columbia Pictures
- Formerly: Columbia Pictures Corporation (1924–1968)
- Type: Subsidiary
- Industry: Distribution; Film
- Predecessor: Cohn-Brandt-Cohn (CBC) Film Sales Corporation (1918–1924)
- Founded: June 19, 1918; 108 years ago (as Cohn-Brandt-Cohn (CBC) Film Sales Corporation) in New York City, United States; January 10, 1924; 102 years ago (as Columbia Pictures) in Los Angeles, United States
- Founders: Harry Cohn; Jack Cohn; Joe Brandt
- Headquarters: Thalberg Building, 10202 West Washington Boulevard, Culver City, California, U.S.
- Area served: Worldwide
- Key people: Peter Kang (president, Production); Michael Marshall (president, Business Affairs & Administration)
- Products: Motion pictures
- Parent: The Coca-Cola Company (1982–1987); Sony Pictures (1989–present)
- Subsidiaries: Ghost Corps
- Website: sonypictures.com (Note: The "columbiapictures.com" URL redirects to this website, as does the website for the studio's 100th anniversary, "columbiapictures100.com".)

Columbia Pictures Industries, Inc., also referred to as Columbia Pictures, is an American distribution and film production company. It is the flagship unit of the Sony Pictures Motion Picture Group, a division of Sony Pictures, which is one of the major film studios and a subsidiary of the Japanese conglomerate Sony Group Corporation. Columbia Pictures is one of the leading film studios in the world, and was one of the so-called "Little Three" among the eight major film studios of Hollywood's "Golden Age".

On June 19, 1918, brothers Jack and Harry Cohn and their best friend and business partner Joe Brandt founded the studio as Cohn-Brandt-Cohn (CBC) Film Sales Corporation. It adopted the Columbia Pictures name on January 10, 1924 (operating as Columbia Pictures Corporation until December 23, 1968), went public two years later, and eventually began to use the image of Columbia, the female personification of the United States, as its logo. The studio was acquired by the Coca-Cola Company in 1982, then by Sony Corporation of Japan in 1989. Columbia Pictures is presently headquartered at the Irving Thalberg Building on the former Metro-Goldwyn-Mayer (currently known as the Sony Pictures Studios) lot in Culver City, California, since 1990.

In its early years, Columbia was a minor player in Hollywood, but began to grow in the late 1920s, spurred by a successful association with director Frank Capra. With Capra, Leo McCarey, George Stevens, and others, Columbia became one of the primary homes of the screwball comedy. In the 1930s, Columbia's major contract stars were Jean Arthur and Cary Grant. In the 1940s, Rita Hayworth became the studio's premier star and propelled their fortunes into the late 1950s. Rosalind Russell, Glenn Ford and William Holden also became major stars at the studio. The company was also primarily responsible for distributing Disney's Silly Symphony film series as well as the Mickey Mouse cartoon series from 1929 to 1932.

Columbia Pictures is currently one of the five live-action labels of the Sony Pictures Motion Picture Group, alongside TriStar Pictures, Screen Gems, Sony Pictures Classics, and 3000 Pictures. Columbia also releases most animated films produced by Sony Pictures Animation intended for a theatrical release.

== History ==
=== Early years as CBC Film Sales (1918–1924) ===
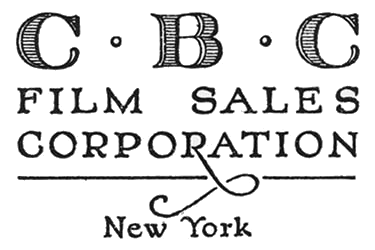
The original CBC Film Sales logo used from 1919 through 1924

The studio was founded on June 19, 1918, as Cohn-Brandt-Cohn (CBC) Film Sales by brothers Jack and Harry Cohn and Jack's best friend Joe Brandt, and released its first feature film More to Be Pitied Than Scorned on August 20, 1922. The film, with a budget of $20,000, was a success, bringing in $130,000 in revenue for the company. Brandt was president of CBC Film Sales, handling sales, marketing and distribution from New York along with Jack Cohn, while Harry Cohn ran production in Hollywood. The studio's early productions were low-budget short subjects: Screen Snapshots, the Hallroom Boys (the vaudeville duo of Edward Flanagan and Neely Edwards), and the former Charlie Chaplin imitator Billy West. The start-up CBC leased space in a Poverty Row studio on Hollywood's famously low-rent Gower Street. Among Hollywood's elite, the studio's small-time reputation led some to joke that "CBC" stood for "Corned Beef and Cabbage".

=== Reorganization and new name ===
CBC was reorganized as Columbia Pictures Corporation by Harry Cohn, Jack Cohn, and Joe Brandt on January 10, 1924. Harry Cohn became president in 1932 and remained head of production as well, thus concentrating enormous power in his hands. He would run Columbia for a total of 34 years, one of the longest tenures of any studio chief (Warner Bros.' Jack L. Warner was head of production or CEO longer but did not become CEO until 1956). Even in an industry rife with nepotism, Columbia was particularly notorious for having a number of Harry and Jack's relatives in high positions. Humorist Robert Benchley called it the Pine Tree Studio, "because it has so many Cohns".

Brandt eventually tired of dealing with the Cohn brothers, and in 1932 sold his one-third stake to Jack and Harry Cohn. Harry took over from Brandt as president.

Columbia's product line consisted mostly of low- to moderately budgeted features and short subjects encompassing action subjects, comedies, sports films, serials, and cartoons. Columbia gradually moved into the production of higher-budget fare, eventually joining the second tier of Hollywood studios along with United Artists and Universal. Like United Artists and Universal, Columbia was a horizontally integrated company. It controlled production and distribution; it did not own any theaters.

Helping Columbia's climb was the arrival of an ambitious director, Frank Capra. Between 1927 and 1939, Capra constantly pushed Cohn for better material and bigger budgets. A string of hits he directed in the early and mid 1930s solidified Columbia's status as a major studio. In particular, It Happened One Night, which nearly swept the 1934 Oscars, put Columbia on the map. Until then, Columbia's business had depended on theater owners willing to take its films, since it did not have a theater network of its own. Other Capra-directed hits followed, including the original version of Lost Horizon (1937), with Ronald Colman, and Mr. Smith Goes to Washington (1939) with James Stewart.

In 1933, Columbia hired Robert Kalloch to be its chief fashion and women's costume designer. He was the first contract costume designer hired by the studio, and he established the studio's wardrobe department. Kalloch's employment, in turn, convinced leading actresses that Columbia Pictures intended to invest in their careers.

In 1938, the addition of B. B. Kahane as vice president would produce Charles Vidor's Those High Grey Walls (1939), and The Lady in Question (1940), the first joint film of Rita Hayworth and Glenn Ford. Kahane would later become the president of Academy of Motion Picture Arts and Sciences in 1959, until his death a year later.

Columbia could not afford to keep a huge roster of contract stars, so Jack Cohn usually borrowed them from other studios. At Metro-Goldwyn-Mayer, the industry's most prestigious studio, Columbia was nicknamed "Siberia", as Louis B. Mayer would use the loan-out to Columbia as a way to punish his less-obedient signings. In the 1930s, Columbia signed Jean Arthur to a long-term contract, and after The Whole Town's Talking (1935), Arthur became a major comedy star. Ann Sothern's career was launched when Columbia signed her to a contract in 1936. Cary Grant signed a contract in 1937 and soon after it was altered to a non-exclusive contract shared with RKO.

Many theaters relied on westerns to attract big weekend audiences, and Columbia always recognized this market. Its first cowboy star was Buck Jones, who signed with Columbia in 1930 for a fraction of his former big-studio salary. Over the next two decades Columbia released scores of outdoor adventures with Jones, Tim McCoy, Ken Maynard, Jack Luden, Bob Allen, Russell Hayden, Tex Ritter, Ken Curtis, and Gene Autry. Columbia's most popular cowboy was Charles Starrett, who signed with Columbia in 1935 and still holds the record for starring in the longest string of feature films (131 titles over 17 years).

=== Short subjects ===
At Harry Cohn's insistence, the studio signed vaudeville comedians The Three Stooges in 1934. Rejected by MGM (which kept straight-man Ted Healy but let the Stooges go), the Stooges made 190 slapstick shorts for Columbia between 1934 and 1957. Columbia's short-subject department employed many famous comedians, including Buster Keaton, Charley Chase, Harry Langdon, Andy Clyde, and Hugh Herbert. Almost 400 of Columbia's 529 two-reel comedies were released to television between 1958 and 1961; to date, all of the Stooges, Keaton, Charley Chase, Shemp Howard, Joe Besser, and Joe DeRita subjects have been released to home video.

Columbia incorporated animation into its studio in 1929, distributing Krazy Kat cartoons, taking over from Paramount. The following year, Columbia served as the distributor for Walt Disney's Mickey Mouse and Silly Symphony series from Pat Powers's Celebrity Productions until 1932. In 1933, The Charles Mintz studio was re-established under the Screen Gems brand; Columbia's leading cartoon series were Krazy Kat, Scrappy, The Fox and the Crow, and (very briefly) Li'l Abner. Screen Gems was the last major cartoon studio to make black-and-white cartoons, producing them until 1946. That same year, Screen Gems shut down but had completed enough cartoons for the studio to release until 1949. In 1948, Columbia agreed to release animated shorts from United Productions of America; these new shorts were more sophisticated than Columbia's older cartoons, and many won critical praise and industry awards. Bill Hanna and Joe Barbera made TV cartoons for Columbia; Columbia asked the team for a theatrical series, and from 1959 to 1965 Columbia distributed cartoons featuring Loopy De Loop. It was Columbia's final theatrical cartoon series. In 1967, the Hanna-Barbera deal expired and was not renewed.

According to the Bob Thomas book King Cohn, studio chief Harry Cohn always placed a high priority on serials. Beginning in 1937, Columbia entered the lucrative serial market and kept making these weekly episodic adventures until 1955, after other studios had discontinued them; then the studio reissued older serials to theaters until 1966. The most famous Columbia serials are based on pulp magazine, comic-strip or radio characters: The Spider's Web (1938), Mandrake the Magician (1939), The Shadow (1940), Terry and the Pirates (1940), Captain Midnight (1942), The Phantom (1943), Batman (1943), and the especially successful Superman (1948), among many others.

Columbia also produced musical shorts, sports reels (usually narrated by sportscaster Bill Stern), and travelogues. Its Screen Snapshots series, showing behind-the-scenes footage of Hollywood stars, was a Columbia perennial the studio had been releasing since 1920; producer-director Ralph Staub kept this series going through 1958. Harry Cohn was especially proud of the longevity of the Snapshots, and only his death curtailed the series.

=== 1940s ===
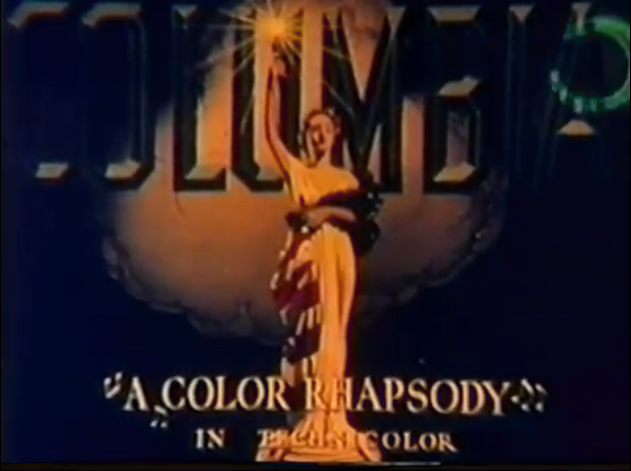
The logo Columbia used starting in 1936 and ending in 1976; this version was used on the Color Rhapsody cartoons.

In the 1940s, propelled in part by the surge in audiences for their films during World War II, the studio also benefited from the popularity of its biggest star, Rita Hayworth. Columbia maintained a long list of contractees well into the 1950s; Glenn Ford, Penny Singleton, William Holden, Judy Holliday, The Three Stooges, Ann Miller, Evelyn Keyes, Ann Doran, Jack Lemmon, Cleo Moore, Barbara Hale, Adele Jergens, Larry Parks, Arthur Lake, Lucille Ball, Jock Mahoney, Kerwin Mathews, and Kim Novak.

Harry Cohn monitored the budgets of his films, and the studio got the maximum use out of costly sets, costumes, and props by reusing them in other films. Many of Columbia's low-budget "B" pictures and short subjects have an expensive look, thanks to Columbia's efficient recycling policy. Cohn was reluctant to spend lavish sums on even his most important pictures, and it was not until 1943 that he agreed to use three-strip Technicolor in a live-action feature. Columbia was the last major studio to employ the expensive color process. Columbia's first Technicolor feature was the western The Desperadoes, starring Randolph Scott and Glenn Ford. Cohn quickly used Technicolor again for Cover Girl, a Hayworth vehicle that instantly was a smash hit, released in 1944, and for the fanciful biography of Frédéric Chopin, A Song to Remember, with Cornel Wilde, released in 1945. Another biopic, 1946's The Jolson Story with Larry Parks and Evelyn Keyes, was started in black-and-white, but when Cohn saw how well the project was proceeding, he scrapped the footage and insisted on filming in Technicolor.

In 1948, the United States v. Paramount Pictures, Inc. anti-trust decision forced Hollywood motion picture companies to divest themselves of the theater chains they owned. Since Columbia did not own any theaters, it was now on equal terms with the largest studios. The studio soon replaced RKO on the list of the "Big Five" studios.

==== Screen Gems ====
Screen Gems' final television logo, used from 1965 to 1974

In 1946, Columbia dropped the Screen Gems brand from its cartoon line, but retained the Screen Gems name for various ancillary activities, including a 16 mm film-rental agency and a TV-commercial production company. On November 8, 1948, Columbia adopted the Screen Gems name for its television production subsidiary when the studio acquired Pioneer Telefilms, a television commercial company founded by Jack Cohn's son, Ralph. Pioneer had been founded in 1947, and was later reorganized as Screen Gems. The studio opened its doors for business in New York on April 15, 1949. By 1951, Screen Gems became a full-fledged television studio and became a major producer of situation comedies for TV, beginning with Father Knows Best and followed by Dennis the Menace, The Donna Reed Show, Bewitched, Hazel, I Dream of Jeannie, The Monkees, and The Partridge Family.

On July 1, 1956, studio veteran Irving Briskin stepped down as manager of Columbia Pictures and formed Briskin Productions, Inc. to release series through Screen Gems and supervise all of its productions. On December 10, Screen Gems expanded into television syndication by acquiring Hygo Television Films (a.k.a. "Serials Inc.") and its affiliated company United Television Films, Inc. Hygo Television Films was founded in 1951 by Jerome Hyams, who also acquired United Television Films in 1955 that was founded by Archie Mayers.

In 1957, two years before its parent company Columbia dropped UPA, Screen Gems entered a distribution deal with Hanna-Barbera Productions, which produced classic animated series such as The Flintstones, The Quick Draw McGraw Show, The Huckleberry Hound Show, The Yogi Bear Show, Jonny Quest, The Jetsons and Top Cat among others. Screen Gems distributed the company's shows until 1967, when Hanna-Barbera was sold to Taft Broadcasting. In 1960, the animation studio became a publicly traded company under the name Screen Gems, Inc., when Columbia spun off an 18% stake.

=== 1950s ===
By 1950, Columbia had discontinued most of its popular series films (Boston Blackie, Blondie, The Lone Wolf, The Crime Doctor, Rusty, etc.) Only Jungle Jim, launched by producer Sam Katzman in 1949, kept going through 1955. Katzman contributed greatly to Columbia's success by producing dozens of topical feature films, including crime dramas, science-fiction stories, and rock'n'roll musicals. Columbia kept releasing new serials (produced by Katzman) until 1956 and new two-reel comedies (produced by Jules White) until 1959, after other studios had abandoned these subjects.

As the larger studios declined in the 1950s, Columbia's position improved. This was largely because it did not suffer from the massive loss of income the other major studios sustained from the loss of their theaters (well over 90%, in some cases). Columbia continued to produce 40-plus pictures a year, offering productions that often broke ground and kept audiences coming to theaters. Some of its significant films from this era include the studio's adaptation of the controversial James Jones novel From Here to Eternity (1953), On the Waterfront (1954), and The Bridge on the River Kwai (1957) with William Holden and Alec Guinness, all of which won the Best Picture Oscar. Another significant film of the studio was the free adaptation of George Orwell's dystopian novel Nineteen Eighty-Four (1956).

Columbia also released the productions of the English studio Warwick Films (by producers Irving Allen and Albert R. Broccoli), as well as many films by producer Carl Foreman, who resided in England. Columbia distributed some films made by Hammer, which was also based in England.

In December 1956, Jack Cohn, co-founder and executive vice-president, died. In 1958, Columbia established its own record label, Colpix Records, initially run by Jonie Taps, who headed Columbia's music department, and later Paul Wexler and Lester Sill. Colpix was active until 1966 when Columbia entered into a joint agreement with RCA Victor and discontinued Colpix in favor of its new label, Colgems Records.

=== 1960s: After Harry Cohn's death ===
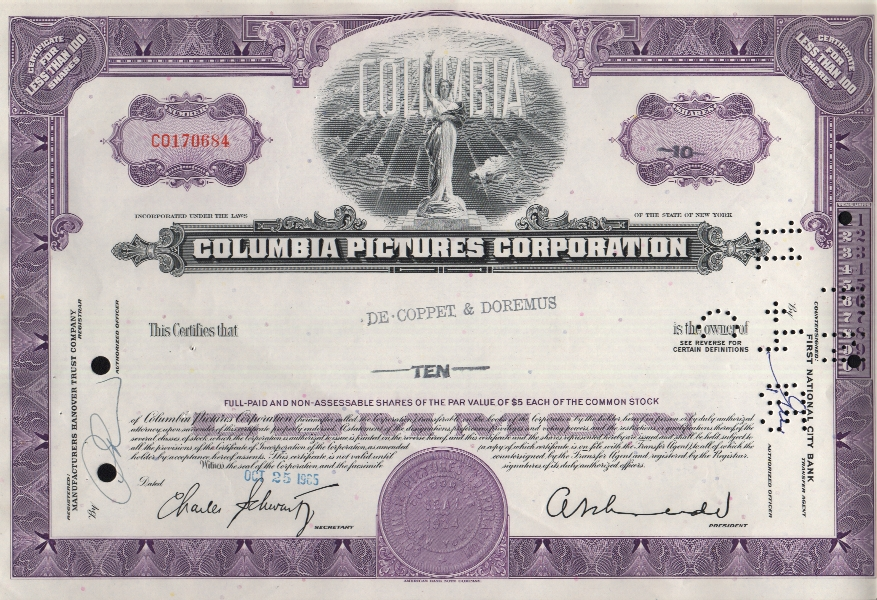
Stock certificate in 1965

Columbia president Harry Cohn died of a heart attack in February 1958. His nephew Ralph Cohn died in 1959, ending almost four decades of family management.

The new management was headed by Abe Schneider, who had joined the company as an office boy out of high school and become a director in 1929, rising through the financial side of the business. In 1963, Columbia acquired music publisher Aldon Music.

By the late 1960s, Columbia had an ambiguous identity, offering old-fashioned fare such as A Man for All Seasons and Oliver! along with the more contemporary Easy Rider and The Monkees. After turning down releasing Albert R. Broccoli's Eon Productions James Bond films, Columbia hired Broccoli's former partner Irving Allen to produce the Matt Helm series with Dean Martin. Columbia also produced a James Bond spoof, Casino Royale (1967), in conjunction with Charles K. Feldman, which held the adaptation rights for that novel.

By 1966, the studio was suffering from box-office failures, and takeover rumors began surfacing. Columbia was surviving solely on the profits made from Screen Gems, whose holdings also included radio and television stations. On December 23, 1968, Screen Gems merged with Columbia Pictures Corporation and became part of the newly formed Columbia Pictures Industries, Inc. for $24.5 million. Schneider was chairman of the holding company and Leo Jaffe president. Following the merger, in March 1969, CPI purchased Bell Records for $3.5 million (mainly in CPI stock), retaining Larry Uttal as label president.

=== 1970s ===
Nearly bankrupt by the early 1970s, the studio was saved via a radical overhaul: the Gower Street Studios (now called "Sunset Gower Studios") were sold and a new management team was brought in. In 1972, Columbia and Warner Bros. formed a partnership called The Burbank Studios, in which both companies shared the Warner studio lot in Burbank.

In 1971, Columbia Pictures established sheet music publisher Columbia Pictures Publications, with vice president and general manager Frank J. Hackinson, who later became the president.

In 1973, Allen & Co took a financial stake in Columbia Pictures Industries and Alan Hirschfield was appointed CEO, succeeding Leo Jaffe who became chairman. Stanley Schneider, son of Abe Schneider (who became honorary chairman before leaving the board in 1975) was replaced as head of the Columbia Pictures studio by David Begelman, who reported to Hirschfield. Some years later Begelman was involved in a check-forging scandal that badly hurt the studio's image.

On May 6, 1974, Columbia retired the Screen Gems name from television, renaming its television division Columbia Pictures Television. The name was suggested by David Gerber, who was then president of Columbia's television division. The same year, Columbia Pictures acquired Rastar Pictures, which included Rastar Productions, Rastar Features, and Rastar Television. Ray Stark then founded Rastar Films, the reincarnation of Rastar Pictures, which was acquired by Columbia Pictures in February 1980.

Columbia Pictures also reorganized its music and record divisions. Clive Davis was hired as a record and music consultant by Columbia Pictures in 1974 and later became temporary president of Bell Records. Davis's real goal was to revitalize Columbia Pictures' music division. With a $10 million investment by CPI, and a reorganization of the various Columbia Pictures legacy labels (Colpix, Colgems, and Bell), Davis introduced Columbia Pictures' new record division, Arista Records, in November 1974, with Davis himself owning 20% of the new venture. Columbia maintained control of the label until 1979, when it was sold to Ariola Records. In addition, Columbia sold its music publishing business (Columbia-Screen Gems) to EMI in August 1976 for $15 million. Both would later be reunited with Columbia Pictures under Sony ownership.

In December 1976, Columbia Pictures acquired the arcade game company D. Gottlieb & Co. for $50 million.

In 1978, Begelman was suspended for having embezzled money from Columbia. Hirschfield was forced out for his refusal to reinstate him. Begelman later resigned and was replaced by Daniel Melnick in June 1978. Fay Vincent was hired to replace Hirschfield.

Frank Price became president of production in 1978. In March 1979, he would become president of Columbia Pictures, succeeding Melnick. During Price's tenure he was responsible for turning out 9 of the top 10 grossing films in Columbia's history.

In the fall of 1978, Kirk Kerkorian, a Vegas casino mogul who also controlled Metro-Goldwyn-Mayer, acquired a 5.5% stake in Columbia Pictures. He then announced on November 20, he intended to launch a tender offer to acquire another 20% for the studio. On December 14, a standstill agreement was reached with Columbia by promising not to go beyond 25% or seeking control for at least three years.

On January 15, 1979, the United States Department of Justice filed an antitrust suit against Kerkorian to block him from holding a stake in Columbia while controlling MGM. On February 19, 1979, Columbia Pictures Television acquired TOY Productions; the production company founded by Bud Yorkin and writers Saul Turteltaub and Bernie Orenstein in 1976. In May, Kerkorian acquired an additional 214,000 shares in Columbia, raising his stake to 25%. On August 2, the trial began; on August 14, the court ruled in favor for Kerkorian. In 1979, Columbia agreed with Time-Life Video to release 20 titles on videocassette.

=== 1980s: Coca-Cola, Tri-Star, and other acquisitions and ventures ===
On September 30, 1980, Kerkorian sued Columbia for ignoring shareholders' interest and violating an agreement with him. Columbia later accused him on October 2, of scheming with Nelson Bunker Hunt to gain control of Columbia.

In 1981, Kerkorian sold his 25% stake in Columbia back to CPI. Columbia Pictures later acquired 81% of The Walter Reade Organization, which owned 11 theaters; it purchased the remaining 19% in 1985.

Around this time, Columbia put Steven Spielberg's proposed follow-up to Close Encounters of the Third Kind, Night Skies, into turnaround (halting a production and making it available to outsiders). The project eventually became the highest-grossing film of the time, E.T. the Extra-Terrestrial. Columbia received a share of the profits for its involvement in the development.

On May 17, 1982, Columbia Pictures acquired Spelling-Goldberg Productions for over $40 million. With a healthier balance-sheet (due in large part to boxoffice hits like Kramer vs. Kramer, Stir Crazy, The Blue Lagoon, and Stripes), Columbia was bought by The Coca-Cola Company on June 22, 1982, for $750 million. Studio head Frank Price mixed big hits like Tootsie, Gandhi, The Karate Kid, The Big Chill, and Ghostbusters with many costly flops. To share the increasing cost of film production, Coke brought in two outside investors whose earlier efforts in Hollywood had come to nothing. In 1982, Columbia, Time Inc.'s HBO and CBS announced, as a joint venture, "Nova Pictures"; this enterprise was to be renamed Tri-Star Pictures. In 1983, Price left Columbia Pictures after a dispute with Coca-Cola and went back to Universal. He was replaced by Guy McElwaine.

In the early 1980s, Columbia and Tri-Star Pictures set up a film partnership with Delphi Film Associates and acquired an interest in various film releases. In 1984, Delphi Film Associates III acquired an interest in the Tri-Star and Columbia film slate of 1984, which would make a $60 million offering in the financing of film production. Also that year, Columbia Pictures had bought out the rights to Hardbodies, which was once premiered on The Playboy Channel.

Columbia Pictures expanded its music publishing operations in the 1980s, acquiring Big 3 Publishing (the former sheet music operations of Robbins, Feist, and Miller) from MGM/UA Communications Co. in 1983, Belwin-Mills Publishing from Simon & Schuster in 1985, and Al Gallico Music in 1987.

On June 18, 1985, Columbia's parent acquired Norman Lear and Jerry Perenchio's Embassy Communications, Inc. (including Embassy Pictures, Embassy Television, Tandem Productions, and Embassy Home Entertainment), mostly for its library of television series such as All in the Family and The Jeffersons, for $485 million. On November 16, 1985, CBS dropped out of the Tri-Star venture.

Many changes occurred in 1986. Expanding its television franchise, on May 5, Columbia's parent also bought Merv Griffin Enterprises for $250 million. The company was notable for: Wheel of Fortune, Jeopardy!, Dance Fever, and The Merv Griffin Show. Months later on August 28, the Columbia Pictures Television Group acquired Danny Arnold's Danny Arnold Productions, Inc.. The deal included Arnold's rights to the sitcom Barney Miller (Four D Productions) among other produced series such as Fish (The Mimus Corporation), A.E.S. Hudson Street (Triseme Corporation), and Joe Bash (Tetagram Ltd.). Arnold had dropped the federal and state lawsuits against the television studio, who was accusing them of antitrust violations, fraud, and breach of fiduciary duty.

Coca-Cola sold the Embassy Pictures division to Dino de Laurentiis, who later folded Embassy Pictures into Dino de Laurentiis Productions, Inc. The company was renamed as De Laurentiis Entertainment Group. Coca-Cola also sold Embassy Home Entertainment to Nelson Entertainment. Coca-Cola, however, retained the Embassy Pictures name, logo, and trademark. HBO was the last partner to drop out of the Tri-Star venture and sold its shares to Columbia Tri-Star later expanded into the television business with its new Tri-Star Television division.

The same year, Columbia recruited British producer David Puttnam to head the studio. Puttnam attempted to defy Hollywood filmmaking by making smaller films instead of big tentpole pictures. His criticism of American film production, in addition to the fact the films he greenlit were mostly flops, left Coke and Hollywood concerned.

Puttnam then discontinued multi-picture pacts with various filmmakers, including Norman Jewison, which was permitted to expire before all of the promised product could be delivered. Under Puttnam's control, he set up a $270 million package of in-house pictures and acquisitions, and the average lineup of 25 features was expected to be $10.78 million, about $4 million less of the cost at Columbia before Puttnam came on board, and a number of low-cost acquisitions such as Spike Lee's $5 million picture School Daze.

On October 22, 1986, Greg Coote was appointed by Columbia Pictures as key executive of the studio, to complement David Puttman's pledge on Columbia Pictures to fix its sights over its international market. On December 17, 1986, the company acquired a 30% share in Roadshow, Coote & Carroll, a company Greg Coote headed, and decided they would pick up films and miniseries to put an effort to add it up to Columbia's shares, and listed dozens of theatrical and television films and dozens of miniseries throughout the addition of the Columbia slate.

On June 26, 1987, Coca-Cola sold The Walter Reade Organization to Cineplex Odeon Corporation. On October 14, 1987, Coca-Cola's entertainment division invested in $30 million in Castle Rock Entertainment with five Hollywood executives. Coke's entertainment business division owned 40% in Castle Rock, while the execs owned 60%.

==== Columbia Pictures Entertainment era (1987–1989) ====
The volatile film business made Coke shareholders nervous, and following the critical and box-office failure of Ishtar, Coke spun off its entertainment holdings on December 21, 1987, and sold it to Tri-Star Pictures for $3.1 billion. Tri-Star Pictures, Inc. was renamed as Columbia Pictures Entertainment, Inc. (CPE), with Coke owning 80% of the company. Both studios continued to produce and distribute films under their separate names.

Puttnam was ousted from the position after only one year. Puttnam was succeeded by Dawn Steel. Other small-scale, "boutique" entities were created: Nelson Entertainment, a joint venture with British and Canadian partners, Triumph Films, jointly owned with French studio Gaumont, and which is now a low-budget label, and Castle Rock Entertainment.

On January 2, 1988, Columbia/Embassy Television and Tri-Star Television were formed into the new Columbia Pictures Television and Embassy Communications was renamed as ELP Communications to serve as a copyright holder of the Embassy television productions. In early 1988, CPE relaunched Triumph Films as Triumph Releasing Corporation, which handled administrative services related to distribution of Columbia and Tri-Star's films for the North American market, while Triumph was responsible for the sales, marketing and distribution of Columbia and Tri-Star films under the direction of each individual studio internationally, with Patrick N. Williamson serving as head of Triumph.

On January 16, 1988, CPE's stock fell slightly in the market on its first day trading in the New York Stock Exchange. Coke spun off 34.1 million of its Columbia shares to its shareholders by reducing its stake in CPE from 80% to 49%. On April 13, 1988, CPE spun off Tri-Star Pictures, Inc. as a reformed company of the Tri-Star studio. In April 1988, CPE sold its music publishing operations to the British company Filmtrax. (Filmtrax was acquired by Thorn EMI in 1990.) In June 1988, CPE announced the sale of Columbia Pictures Publications (consisting of the print music operations) to the investment firm Boston Ventures and was renamed CPP/Belwin. CPP/Belwin was acquired by Warner Chappell Music of Warner Bros. in 1994.

On February 2, 1989, Columbia Pictures Television formed a joint-venture with Norman Lear's Act III Communications called Act III Television (now Act III Productions) to produce television series instead of managing.

=== Sony era (1989–present) ===
On September 28, 1989, the Columbia Pictures empire was sold to the electronics giant Sony, one of several Japanese firms then buying American properties, for the amount of $3.4 billion. The sale netted Coca-Cola a profit from its investment in the studio. Sony then hired two producers, Peter Guber and Jon Peters, to serve as coheads of production when Sony also acquired the Guber-Peters Entertainment Company (the former game show production company, Barris Industries) for $200 million on September 29, 1989. Guber and Peters had just signed a long-term contract with Warner Bros. in 1989, having been with the company since 1983. Warner Bros., then a subsidiary of Warner Communications, sued Sony for $1 billion. Sony completed CPE's acquisition on November 8, and the Guber-Peters acquisition was completed on the following day.

On December 1, 1989, Guber and Peters hired a longtime lawyer of GPEC, Alan J. Levine, to the post of president and COO of Columbia's newly formed company Filmed Entertainment Group (FEG). FEG consisted of Columbia Pictures, Tri-Star Pictures, Triumph Releasing, Columbia Pictures Television, Columbia Pictures Television Distribution, Merv Griffin Enterprises, RCA/Columbia Pictures Home Video (internationally known as RCA/Columbia Pictures International Video), Guber-Peters Entertainment Company, and ancillary and distribution companies.

==== 1990s ====
Columbia Pictures painting on the outer wall of Sony Pictures Studios after the 1993 change.

In 1990, Sony ended up paying hundreds of millions of dollars, gave up a half-interest in its Columbia House Records Club mail-order business, and bought from Time Warner the former Metro-Goldwyn-Mayer (MGM) studio lot in Culver City, which Warner Communications had acquired in its takeover of Lorimar-Telepictures in 1989, thus ending the Burbank Studios partnership. Initially renamed Columbia Studios, Sony spent $100 million to refurbish the rechristened Sony Pictures Studios lot.

Guber and Peters set out to prove they were worth this fortune, but though there were to be some successes, there were also many costly flops. The same year, Frank Price was made the chairman of Columbia Pictures. His company Price Entertainment, Inc., which he founded in 1987, was merged with Columbia in March 1991. Price left Columbia on October 4, 1991, and was replaced by Warner Bros. executive Mark Canton and reactivated Price Entertainment as Price Entertainment Company with a nonexclusive deal with SPE. Peters was fired by his partner Guber in 1991, but Guber later resigned in 1994 to form Mandalay Entertainment the following year. The entire operation was reorganized and renamed Sony Pictures Entertainment (SPE) on August 7, 1991, and at the same time, TriStar (which had officially lost its hyphen) relaunched its television division in October. In December 1991, SPE created Sony Pictures Classics for arthouse fare and was headed by Michael Barker, Tom Bernard, and Marcie Bloom, who previously operated United Artists Classics and Orion Classics. Publicly humiliated, Sony suffered an enormous loss on its investment in Columbia, taking a $2.7 billion write-off in 1994. John Calley took over as SPE president in November 1996, installing Amy Pascal as Columbia Pictures president and Chris Lee as president of production at TriStar. By the next spring, the studios were clearly rebounding, setting a record pace at the box office. On December 7, 1992, Sony Pictures acquired the Barry & Enright game show library.

On February 21, 1994, Columbia Pictures Television and TriStar Television merged to form Columbia TriStar Television (CTT), including the rights to Wheel of Fortune and Jeopardy! after CTT folded Merv Griffin Enterprises in June. That same year, the company also purchased Stewart Television, known for producing game shows such as Pyramid and Chain Reaction, among others. On July 21, 1995, Sony Pictures teamed up with Jim Henson Productions and created the joint venture Jim Henson Pictures.

In the 1990s, Columbia announced plans for a rival James Bond franchise since they owned the rights to Casino Royale and were planning to make a third version of Thunderball with Kevin McClory. MGM and Danjaq, LLC, owners of the franchise, sued Sony Pictures in 1997, with the legal dispute ending two years later in an out-of-court settlement. Sony traded the Casino Royale rights for $10 million, as well as the Spider-Man filming rights. The superhero became Columbia's most successful franchise: The first movie came out in 2002, and as of 2021, there have been seven follow-up movies with US grosses in excess of $2.5 billion. Between the releases of the first and second sequels in 2004 and 2007, Sony led a consortium that purchased MGM, giving it distribution rights to the James Bond franchise.

In 1997, Columbia Pictures ranked as the highest-grossing movie studio in the United States, with a gross of $1.256 billion. In 1998, Columbia and TriStar merged to form the Columbia TriStar Motion Picture Group (a.k.a. Columbia TriStar Pictures), though both studios still produce and distribute under their own names. Pascal retained her position as president of the newly united Columbia Pictures, while Lee became the combined studio's head of production. On December 8, 1998, Sony Pictures Entertainment relaunched the Screen Gems brand as a horror and independent film distribution company after shutting down Triumph Films. In 1999, TriStar Television was folded into CTT. Two years later, CPT was folded into CTT as well.

==== 2000s ====
In the 2000s, Sony broadened its release schedule by backing Revolution Studios, the production/distribution company headed by Joe Roth. On October 25, 2001, CTT and Columbia TriStar Television Distribution (CTTD) merged to form Columbia TriStar Domestic Television and was renamed as Sony Pictures Television on September 16, 2002. Also in 2002, Columbia broke the record for biggest domestic theatrical gross, with a tally of $1.575 billion, coincidentally breaking its own record of $1.256 billion, set in 1997. The 2002 gross was primarily raised by such blockbusters as Spider-Man, Men in Black II, and XXX.

The studio was also the most lucrative of 2004, with over $1.338 billion in the domestic box office with films such as Spider-Man 2, 50 First Dates, and The Grudge, and in 2006. Columbia's box office successes of 2006 included such blockbusters as The Da Vinci Code, The Pursuit of Happyness, Monster House, Casino Royale (co-distributed with MGM), and Open Season. The studio not only finished the year in first place, but also reached an all-time record high sum of $1.711 billion, which was an all-time yearly record for any studio. It was surpassed by Warner Bros. in 2009.

==== 2010s ====
On October 29, 2010, Matt Tolmach, the copresident of Columbia Pictures, stepped down to produce The Amazing Spider-Man and its sequel. Doug Belgrad, the other copresident of Columbia, was promoted to sole president of the studio. Belgrad and Tolmach had been copresidents of the studio since 2008 and had been working together as a team since 2003. The same day, Hanna Minghella was named president of production of Columbia.

On November 18, 2012, Sony Pictures announced it has passed the profit line of $4 billion worldwide with the success of Columbia's releases Skyfall (also co-distributed with MGM), The Amazing Spider-Man, 21 Jump Street, Men in Black 3, and Hotel Transylvania and Screen Gems' releases Underworld: Awakening, The Vow, and Resident Evil: Retribution.

On July 16, 2014, Doug Belgrad was named president of the Sony Pictures Entertainment Motion Picture Group. He exited the post in June 2016. On June 2, Sanford Panitch, who had been the head of international local language production at the studio, was named president of Columbia Pictures.

In 2019, Sony Interactive Entertainment launched PlayStation Productions with the purpose of adapting PlayStation game franchises into films and television shows and with this, an emphasis was placed on SIE working with Sony Pictures Entertainment, and thus most of the films from PlayStation Productions would be released under Columbia Pictures.

==== 2020s ====
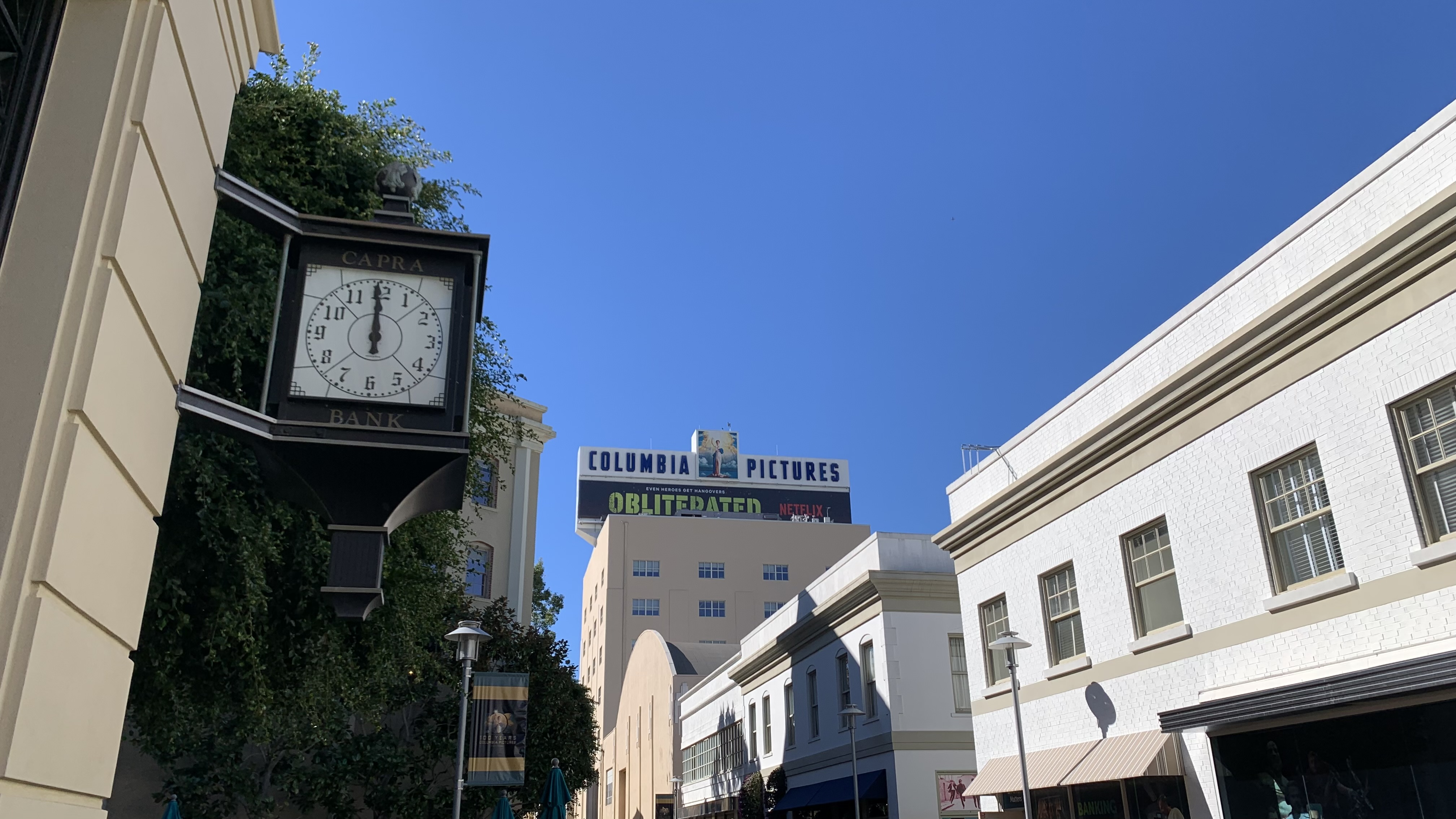
The sign of Columbia Pictures at Sony Pictures Studios in Culver City, California.

In April 2021, Sony signed a deal with Netflix, Inc. and The Walt Disney Company that allows Sony's titles from 2022 to 2026 to stream on Netflix, Hulu and Disney+. Netflix signed for exclusive "pay 1 window" streaming rights, which is typically an 18-month window following its theatrical release, and Disney signed for "pay 2 window" rights for the films, which would be streamed on Disney+ and Hulu as well as broadcast on Disney's linear television networks.

On December 17, 2021, Columbia released Spider-Man: No Way Home. The movie grossed over $1 billion in the box office, being the first film since the start of the COVID-19 pandemic to gross $1 billion. The film became Sony Pictures' highest-grossing release before overtaken by Spider-Man: Brand New Day in July 2026 with $2.056 billion dollars box-office gross.

On January 10, 2024, Sony Pictures celebrated the centennial anniversary of the founding of Columbia Pictures with a new motion logo; the centennial print logo was previously revealed on November 14, 2023. The motion logo, which was used throughout Columbia's 2024 slate, made its theatrical debut in the 2024 re-release of Spider-Man: Across the Spider-Verse (2023).

== International film production ==
In 1998, Columbia Pictures began launching local-language film units to produce local films in Brazil, Germany, Russia (from 2007 to 2021), Asia, India and had short-lived units in Spain and Mexico.

Deutsche Columbia Pictures Filmproduktion produces films for German-speaking territories. The unit's first film was Anatomy, which became the highest-grossing German-language film of 2000. However, after the box office failures of What to Do in Case of Fire?, Viktor Vogel – Commercial Man, Big Girls Don't Cry and Anatomy 2, the unit was closed down in 2003. The unit was later relaunched in 2008, with its first film Friendship! being released in 2010.

Columbia Pictures Film Production Asia produces films for Chinese-language territories and was based in Hong Kong. The unit's notable productions are Not One Less, Crouching Tiger, Hidden Dragon, Big Shot's Funeral and Kung Fu Hustle. The unit closed after the release of the Hong Kong film Jump in 2009. In 2014, Columbia Pictures began striking partnerships with Chinese production companies to make Chinese-language films starting with Monk Comes Down the Mountain in 2015.

== Logo ==
The current on-screen logo of Columbia Pictures, used since 1993; pictured here is its 2022 modification. (Note: Current variant with "A Sony Company" byline used since 2014)

The Columbia Pictures logo, featuring the Torch Lady, a woman carrying a torch and wearing a drape (representing Columbia, a personification of the United States), has gone through six major changes. It has often been compared to the Statue of Liberty, which was an inspiration to the Columbia Pictures logo.

=== History ===
Originally in 1924, Columbia Pictures used a logo featuring a female Roman soldier holding a shield in her left hand and a stick of wheat in her right hand, which was based on actress Doris Doscher (known as the model for the statue on the Pulitzer Fountain) as the Standing Liberty quarter used from 1916 to 1930, though the studio's version was given longer hair. In 1928, Columbia used two logos. The first introduced a new woman wearing a radiate crown and a peplos, and holding a torch in the center of a ribbon-shaped ring similar to the MGM logo, with the slogan "Gems of the Screen", itself a takeoff on the song "Columbia, the Gem of the Ocean". The second had her wearing a draped flag and holding a torch that radiates flickers. The woman wore a headdress, the stola and carried the palla of ancient Rome, and above her are the words "A Columbia Production" ("A Columbia Picture" or "Columbia Pictures Corporation"), written in an arch. The illustration for the latter logo was based upon the actress Evelyn Venable, known for providing the voice of the Blue Fairy in Walt Disney's Pinocchio. The former logo continued to be in use for films intertitles with "The End" until 1933. Its slogan later inspired the renaming of the Charles Mintz Studio into Screen Gems.

In 1936, the logo was changed into the well known look: the Torch Lady now stood on a pedestal, wore no headdress, and the text "Columbia" appeared in chiseled letters behind her. A new form of animation was used on the logo as well, with a torch that radiates light instead of flickers and a cloudy background. Jane Chester Bartholomew, a native of Burgettstown, Pennsylvania (a suburb of Pittsburgh), whom Harry Cohn discovered working as an extra at Columbia, portrayed the Torch Lady in the logo. There were several variations to the logo over the years—significantly, a color version was done in 1943 for The Desperadoes. Two years earlier, the flag became just a drape with no markings. The latter change came after a federal law was passed making it illegal to wear an American flag as clothing. In the 1950s, the woman's robe was redrawn and shaded with a plunging neckline and an exposed slipper-clad foot. The 1976 drama film Taxi Driver was one of the last films released before the "Torch Lady" was revamped. A majestic horn sounder (a la 20th Century Fox) was used as the theme for the 1936 logo and the two 1928 logos. To date, the 1936 version is the studio's longest used logo after forty years.

From 1955 to 1963, Columbia used the Torch Lady from the 1936 logo under the Screen Gems banner, officially billing itself as part of "the Hollywood studios of Columbia Pictures", as spoken at the end of some Screen Gems series.

From 1976 to 1993, Columbia Pictures used two logos. The first, from 1976 to 1981 (or from 1975 for promotional material until 1982 for international territories) used just a sunburst representing the beams from the torch, although the Torch Lady appears briefly in the opening logo. The score accompanying the first logo was composed by Suzanne Ciani. The Torch Lady returned in 1981, but in a much smoother form described as resembling a Coke bottle. The studio hired visual effects pioneer Robert Abel to animate both logos, using over fifty light exposures that included streak and special filter passes. The slogans for the 1976 and 1981 logos were "Let us entertain you" and "Movies That Matter", respectively. Jane Chester Bartholomew was the studio's longest serving model of the Torch Lady from 1936 to 1993.

From 1982 to 1985, Columbia used the 1981 logo for Triumph Films, with the Torch Lady under the Arc de Triomphe in the logo with the bylines "A Columbia Pictures/Gaumont Company" and "A Columbia Gaumont Company". During the studio's run with Coca-Cola, a cream-colored version of the Torch Lady from the 1981 logo was used for the Columbia Pictures Television logo with the byline "A Unit of the Coca-Cola Company" from 1982 until 1987. It was later changed with the byline "A unit of Columbia Pictures Entertainment, Inc." in 1988 after Coke sold Columbia to Tri-Star Pictures. In 1989, the logo was changed again to match the original 1981 version. The byline was removed in 1991 after Columbia Pictures Entertainment was renamed as Sony Pictures Entertainment. The 1981 logo, along with the 1936 and 1976 versions, would be later used in certain 21st century Columbia releases, generally to match the year a given film is set in.

In 1992, the longest-running, and perhaps best known, iteration of the logo was created; the television division was the first to use it. Films began to use the new logo the year after, when Scott Mednick and the Mednick Group were hired by Peter Guber to create logos for all the entertainment properties then owned by Sony Pictures. Mednick hired New Orleans artist Michael Deas, to digitally repaint the logo and return the Torch Lady to her "classic" look. An urban legend is actress Annette Bening was the model for the current logo. Bening's face was later superimposed onto the Torch Lady in the opening intro of What Planet Are You From? (2000) as an inside joke; Bening was a primary cast member in that film.

Michael Deas hired Jennifer Joseph, a 28-year-old graphics artist for The Times-Picayune, as a model for the logo. Due to time constraints, she agreed to help out on her lunch break. It was the first and only time she ever modeled. Joseph had recently discovered she was pregnant at the time. Deas also hired The Times-Picayune photographer Kathy Anderson to photograph the reference photography. The animation was created by Synthespian Studios in 1993 by Jeff Kleiser and Diana Walczak, who used 2D elements from the painting and converted it to 3D. Jonathan Elias composed the current logo's score. The studio being part of Sony would not be referenced on-screen until 1996. In 1999, Sony featured the current logo with a stylized "75” behind the Torch Lady, commemorating the studio's 75th anniversary with the slogan, "Lighting Up Screens Around the World". This logo was used in VHS promos on all of Columbia's 1999 home video releases.

In 2012, the current logo was displayed as a painting at the Ogden Museum of Southern Art in New Orleans. In an interview with CBS affiliate WWL-TV, Deas has told them, "I never thought it would make it to the silver screen and I never thought it would still be up 20 years later, and I certainly never thought it would be in a museum, so it's kind of gratifying." On November 14, 2023, Sony unveiled a special centennial logo ahead the studios' 100th anniversary, consisting of the current Torch Lady within a stylized "100” and later posted an animation that showcases the older logos in the same vein as the Spider-Verse films on January 10, 2024, the 100th anniversary of the founding of Columbia Pictures. This logo was used on all of Columbia's 2024 releases.

The current logo was also used for Screen Gems Network from 1999 until 2002 and Columbia Showcase Theatre from 2000 until 2014, both of which are now-defunct programming blocks that featured syndicated airings of Sony Pictures-owned shows and films, respectively.

Since 1982, Columbia Pictures Television used the Torch Lady as its logo until it shut down in 2001. In 1994, it merged with TriStar Television as Columbia TriStar Television. From 1981 to 2006, Columbia used the Torch Lady as its home video distribution logo (operating as "Columbia Pictures Home Entertainment" from 1978 to 1982; "RCA/Columbia Pictures International Video" from 1981 to 1991; and "RCA/Columbia Pictures Home Video" from 1982 to 1991), merging with TriStar in 1991 (as "Columbia TriStar Home Video" from 1991 to 2001 and "Columbia TriStar Home Entertainment" from 2001 to 2006). The Torch Lady and TriStar's Pegasus were combined into one logo for the television and home video distribution divisions. After reincorporating as Sony Pictures Television and Sony Pictures Home Entertainment in 2002 and 2006, respectively, the Torch Lady and Pegasus were replaced with the vertical lines of the Sony logo.

Gallery
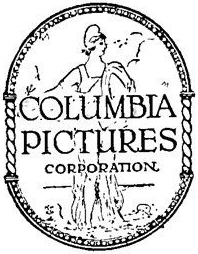
Logo used from 1924 to 1928.

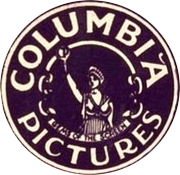
Logo used from 1928 to 1936.

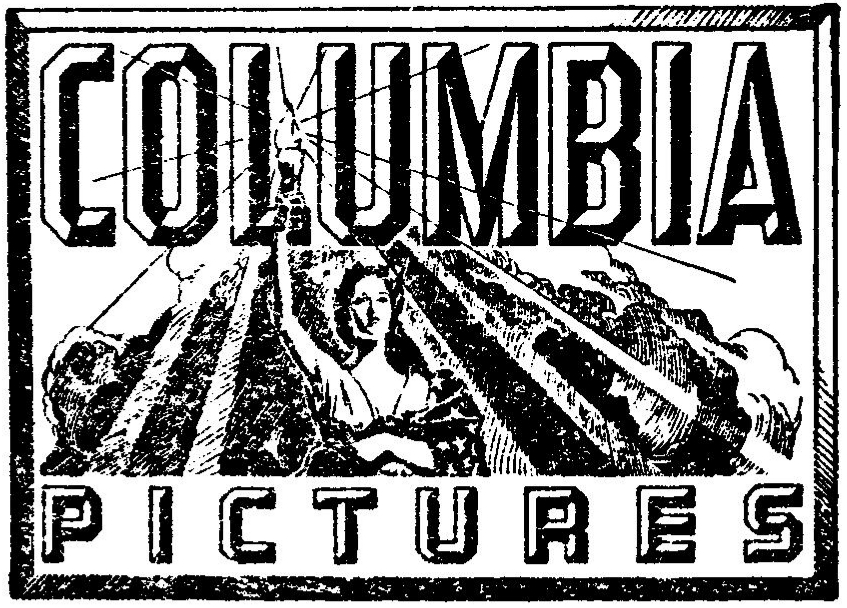
Logo used from 1936 to 1975 in print and onscreen from 1936 to 1976.

Logo initially used for promotional material in 1975 and onscreen from 1976 to 1982.

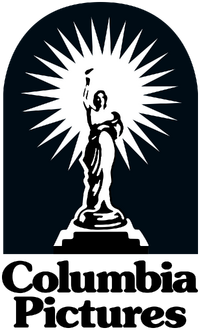
Logo used from 1981 to 1989.

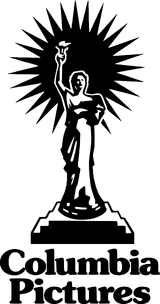
Logo used from 1989 to 1992.

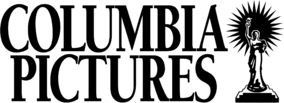
Logo used for promotional material from 1992 to 1993 during the transitional period after Sony consolidated Columbia Pictures and TriStar Pictures into Sony Pictures Entertainment.

== Filmography ==
† Indicates films currently in theatrical release in the week commencing 13 November 2026.

=== Highest-grossing films ===
Highest-grossing films in North America
Rank	Title	Year	Gross
1	Spider-Man: Brand New Day †	2026	$954,477,000
2	Spider-Man: No Way Home ^{‡}	2021	$814,108,407
3	Spider-Man ^{‡}	2002	$407,022,860
4	Jumanji: Welcome to the Jungle	2017	$404,540,171
5	Spider-Man: Far From Home ^{‡}	2019	$390,532,085
6	Spider-Man: Across the Spider-Verse ^{‡}	2023	$381,593,754
7	Spider-Man 2 ^{‡}	2004	$373,585,825
8	Spider-Man 3 ^{‡}	2007	$336,530,303
9	Spider-Man: Homecoming ^{‡}	2017	$334,201,140
10	Jumanji: The Next Level	2019	$320,314,960
11	Skyfall	2012	$304,360,277
12	The Amazing Spider-Man ^{‡}	2012	$262,030,663
13	Men in Black	1997	$250,690,539
14	Ghostbusters	1984	$229,242,989
15	Hancock	2008	$227,946,274
16	The Da Vinci Code	2006	$217,536,138
17	Venom: Let There Be Carnage	2021	$213,550,366
18	Venom	2018	$213,515,506
19	Bad Boys for Life	2020	$204,292,401
20	The Amazing Spider-Man 2 ^{‡}	2014	$202,853,933
21	Spectre	2015	$200,074,609
22	22 Jump Street	2014	$191,719,337
23	Men in Black II	2002	$190,418,803
24	Spider-Man: Into the Spider-Verse	2018	$190,241,310
25	Hitch	2005	$179,495,555

Highest-grossing films worldwide
Rank	Title	Year	Gross
1	Spider-Man: Brand New Day †	2026	$2,505,477,000
2	Spider-Man: No Way Home ^{‡}	2021	$1,916,306,995
3	Skyfall	2012	$1,142,471,295
4	Spider-Man: Far From Home ^{‡}	2019	$1,131,927,996
5	Jumanji: Welcome to the Jungle	2017	$962,126,927
6	Spider-Man 3 ^{‡}	2007	$894,983,373
7	Spectre	2015	$880,674,609
8	Spider-Man: Homecoming ^{‡}	2017	$880,166,924
9	Venom	2018	$855,013,954
10	Spider-Man ^{‡}	2002	$825,025,036
11	Jumanji: The Next Level	2019	$800,059,707
12	2012	2009	$791,217,826
13	Spider-Man 2 ^{‡}	2004	$788,976,453
14	The Da Vinci Code	2006	$758,239,851
15	The Amazing Spider-Man ^{‡}	2012	$757,930,663
16	The Amazing Spider-Man 2 ^{‡}	2014	$708,982,323
17	Spider-Man: Across the Spider-Verse ^{‡}	2023	$690,824,738
18	Hancock	2008	$624,386,746
19	Men in Black 3	2012	$624,026,776
20	Casino Royale	2006	$606,099,584
21	Quantum of Solace	2008	$589,580,482
22	Men in Black	1997	$589,390,539
23	The Smurfs	2011	$563,749,323
24	Hotel Transylvania 3: Summer Vacation	2018	$528,583,774
25	Venom: Let There Be Carnage	2021	$501,546,922

^{‡} Includes theatrical reissue(s).

== See also ==
- List of film serials by studio § Columbia Pictures

== Bibliography ==
- Chierichetti, David (1976). Hollywood Costume Design. New York: Harmony Books. ISBN 9780517526378.
- Dick, Bernard F. (1992). Columbia Pictures: Portrait of a Studio. Lexington, Ky.: University Press of Kentucky. ISBN 9780813117690.
- Jorgensen, Jay; Scoggins, Donald L. (2015). Creating the Illusion: A Fashionable History of Hollywood Costume Designers. Philadelphia: Running Press. ISBN 9780762456611.
- Perry, Jeb H. (1991). Screen Gems: A History of Columbia Pictures Television from Cohn to Coke, 1948-1983. Metuchen, N.J.: Scarecrow Press. ISBN 9780810824874.
- Smyth, Jennifer E. (2018). Nobody's Girl Friday: The Women Who Ran Hollywood. New York: Oxford University Press. ISBN 9780190840822.
