= Harry Cohn =

Co-founder of Columbia Pictures Corporation (1891–1958)

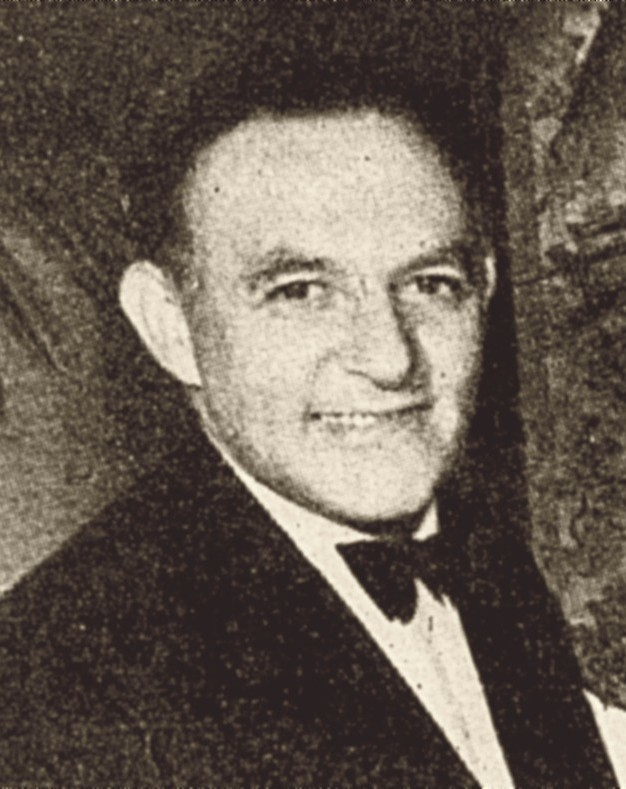
- Cohn c. 1938
- Born: July 23, 1891; New York City, U.S.
- Died: February 27, 1958 (aged 66); Phoenix, Arizona, U.S.
- Resting place: Hollywood Forever Cemetery
- Occupations: Film producer and president of Columbia Pictures Corporation
- Years active: 1919–1958
- Spouses: Rose Barker (m. 1923; div. 1941) Joan Perry (m. 1941)
- Relatives: Jack Cohn (brother); Leonore Annenberg (niece)

Harry Cohn (July 23, 1891 – February 27, 1958) was a co-founder, president, and production director of Columbia Pictures Corporation.

== Life and career ==
Cohn was born to a working-class Jewish family in New York City. His father, Joseph Cohn, was a tailor from Germany, and his mother, Bella Joseph, was from the Pale of Settlement, Russian Empire. He left school early and had a variety of jobs, including chorus boy, fur salesman, pool hustler, shipping clerk, streetcar conductor and song plugger for a sheet music printer. He also appeared in a vaudeville act with Harry Ruby.

He entered the film industry when he got a job with Independent Moving Pictures (which had recently merged to become part of Universal Film Manufacturing Company), where his elder brother, Jack Cohn, was already employed. The brothers made their first film there, Traffic in Souls. Cohn became personal secretary to Universal president, Carl Laemmle.

In 1919, Cohn joined his brother and fellow IMP employee Joe Brandt, to found CBC Film Sales Corporation. The initials officially stood for Cohn, Brandt, and Cohn, but Hollywood wags noted the company's low-budget, low-class efforts and nicknamed CBC "Corned Beef and Cabbage." Harry Cohn managed the company's film production in Hollywood, while his brother managed its finances from New York. The relationship between the two brothers was not always good, and Brandt, finding the partnership stressful, eventually sold his third of the company to Harry, who took over as president, by which time the firm had been renamed Columbia Pictures Corporation.

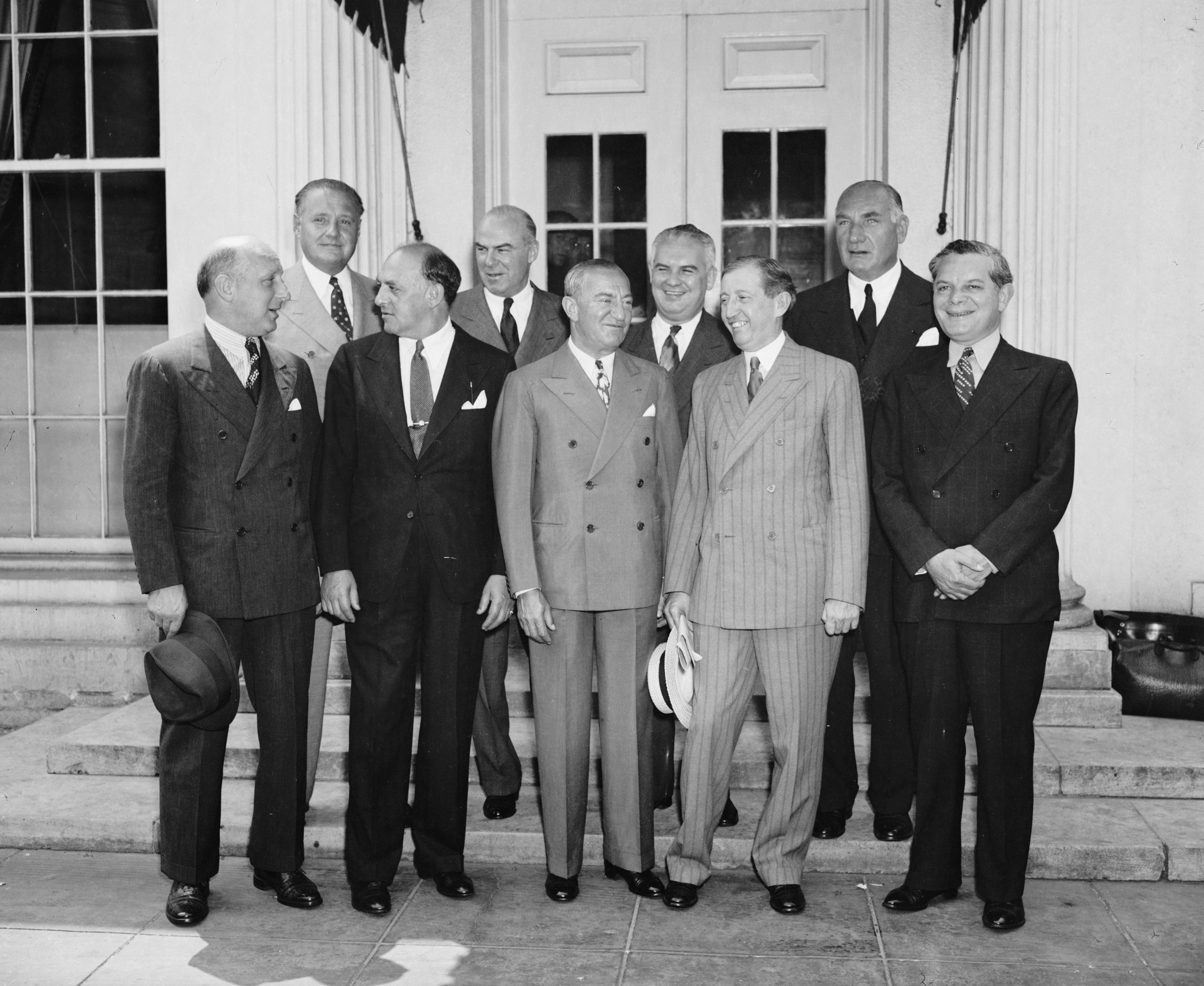
At the White House, front row, left to right: Barney Balaban, Paramount; Harry Cohn, Columbia Pictures; Nicholas M. Schenck, Loew's; Will H. Hays; Leo Spitz, RKO. Back row, left to right: George Schaefer, United Artists; Sidney Kent, 20th Century Fox; N.J. Blumberg, Universal; Albert Warner, Warner Bros., in 1938

Most of Columbia's early work was action fare starring rock-jawed leading man Jack Holt. Columbia was unable to shake off its stigma as a Poverty Row studio until 1934, when director Frank Capra's Columbia comedy It Happened One Night swept the Academy Awards. Exhibitors who formerly wouldn't touch Columbia products became steady customers. As a horizontally integrated company that only controlled production and distribution, Columbia had been at the mercy of theater owners. Columbia expanded its scope to offer moviegoers a regular program of economically made features, short subjects, serials, travelogues, sports reels, and cartoons. Columbia released a few "class" productions each year (Lost Horizon, Holiday, Mr. Smith Goes to Washington, The Jolson Story, Gilda, All the King's Men, etc.), but depended on its popular "budget" productions to keep the company solvent. During Cohn's tenure, the studio always turned a profit.

Cohn did not build a stable of movie stars like other studios. Instead, he generally signed actors who usually worked for more expensive studios (Wheeler & Woolsey, Cary Grant, Katharine Hepburn, Mae West, Humphrey Bogart, Dorothy Lamour, Mickey Rooney, Chester Morris, Warren William, Warner Baxter, Sabu, Gloria Jean, Margaret O'Brien, etc.) to attract a pre-sold audience. Columbia's own stars generally rose from the ranks of small-part actors and featured players (Jean Arthur, Rita Hayworth, Larry Parks, Jacqueline Wells, Lloyd Bridges, Bruce Bennett, Jock Mahoney, etc.). Some of Columbia's producers and directors also graduated from lesser positions as actors, writers, musicians, and assistant directors.

== Management style ==
Harry Cohn was known for his autocratic and intimidating management style. When he took over as Columbia's president, he remained production chief as well, thus concentrating enormous power in his hands. He respected talent above any personal attribute, but he made sure his employees knew who was boss. Writer Ben Hecht referred to him as "White Fang". An employee of Columbia called him "as absolute a monarch as Hollywood ever knew." It was said "he had listening devices on all sound stages and could tune in any conversation on the set, then boom in over a loudspeaker if he heard anything that displeased him." Throughout his tenure, his most popular moniker was "King Cohn."

Moe Howard of the Three Stooges recalled that Cohn was "a real Jekyll-and-Hyde-type guy... socially, he could be very charming." Cohn was known to scream and curse at actors and directors in his office all afternoon, and greet them cordially at a dinner party that evening. There is some suggestion that Cohn deliberately cultivated his reputation as a tyrant, either to motivate his employees or simply because it increased his control of the studio. Cohn is said to have kept a signed photograph of Benito Mussolini, whom he met in Italy in 1933, on his desk until the beginning of World War II. (Columbia produced the documentary Mussolini Speaks in 1933, narrated by Lowell Thomas.) Cohn also had a number of ties to organized crime. He had a long-standing friendship with Chicago mobster John Roselli, and New Jersey mob boss Abner Zwillman was the source of the loan that allowed Cohn to buy out his partner Brandt. Cohn's brash, loud, intimidating style has become Hollywood legend and was reportedly portrayed in various movies. The characters played by Broderick Crawford in All the King's Men (1949) and Born Yesterday (1950), both Columbia pictures, are allegedly based on Cohn, as is Jack Woltz, a movie mogul who appears in The Godfather (1972) as well as Rod Steiger in The Big Knife.

In his own way, Harry Cohn was sentimental about certain professional matters. During his early years as a producer he had signed comedian Billy West to star in a series of comedies, but both the series and the company were underfunded. Only four films were completed before Cohn had to suspend production, and thus Cohn failed to fulfill West's contract. Twelve years later, when West was a struggling bit player, Cohn not only kept him working as an actor but made him an assistant director. He then asked Mr. and Mrs. West to operate the Columbia Grill, a restaurant concession on the studio premises, and then allowed West to take short absences to direct three feature films for minor-league Monogram Pictures. Cohn remembered the valuable contributions of Jack Holt during Columbia's struggling years, and kept him under contract until 1941. Cohn hired the Three Stooges in 1934 and, according to Stooge Larry Fine, "he thought we brought him luck." Although Columbia discontinued almost all of its short-subject series in 1956, Cohn kept the Stooges on his payroll until the end of 1957. Cohn was fond of what he termed "those lousy little 'B' pictures", and kept making them, along with two-reel comedies and serials, after other studios had abandoned them. Perhaps Harry Cohn was most nostalgic about the Screen Snapshots series because it had put Columbia on the map: it was the oldest film series still in production, going back to 1920 and the dawn of the studio. The last film in the series was released four months after Cohn's death; had he lived longer, Screen Snapshots would almost certainly have continued.

Cohn could also hold grudges. He was responsible for the abrupt end to Hazel Scott's film career after Scott protested the degrading costumes black women were scripted to wear on Mae West's 1943 film The Heat's On. Cohn eventually relented, but made good on his vow that Hazel Scott would never set foot on a Hollywood studio lot as long as he lived. After David Niven playfully sent Cohn a lawyer's letter claiming Cohn's yacht as salvage, Cohn failed to see the joke and barred Niven from the Columbia lot; Niven would be hired by Columbia only after Harry Cohn's death. Cohn also resented Loretta Young having a dress redesigned expensively, which he regarded as overcharging him for her wardrobe, and wouldn't speak to her for many years until she apologized to him in person.

According to biographer Michael Fleming, Cohn forced Curly Howard of the Stooges to keep working after suffering a series of minor strokes, which coincided with a further deterioration of Howard's health and his eventual retirement.

== Personal life ==
Cohn was married to Rose Barker from 1923 to 1941, and to actress Joan Perry (1911–1996) from July 1941 until his death in 1958.

His brothers all worked at Columbia. As well as co-founder Jack, the eldest brother Maxwell was a shorts subject producer and Nathan was the New York division manager. Cohn's nephew, Ralph, one of Jack Cohn's three sons, founded Screen Gems. Another of Jack's sons, Robert, was also a Columbia executive. Maxwell's daughter was Leonore "Lee" Cohn Annenberg, the wife of billionaire publishing magnate Walter Annenberg of Philadelphia.

=== Sexual harassment allegations ===
Various accounts have claimed that Cohn asked for and expected sex from female stars in exchange for employment. According to writer Joseph McBride, Jean Arthur quit the film industry when her Columbia Pictures contract expired in 1944 because Cohn was known to harass actresses. When Joan Crawford was subjected to Cohn's advances after signing a three-picture contract with Columbia, she quickly stopped him by saying "Keep it in your pants, Harry. I'm having lunch with Joan [his wife] and the boys [his children] tomorrow."

Rita Hayworth's relationship with Cohn was fraught with aggravation. Her biography, If This Was Happiness, describes how Cohn was angered when she refused his demands to have sex with him. However, he kept her under contract because she made him money. During these Columbia years, each did their best to irritate the other despite their successful working relationship. Cohn tried to groom Mary Castle as Hayworth's successor.

=== Accusations of mob connections ===
Cohn has been accused of having ties with organized crime. In 1957, mobsters threatened Sammy Davis Jr. with violence because the performer was involved with actress Kim Novak, who was under contract with Columbia Pictures. There are several accounts of what happened, but most agree that the organized crime figures who threatened Davis were close to Cohn; according to these accounts, as Novak was white, Cohn was worried a backlash against the interracial relationship would hurt the studio. According to one account, Cohn called racketeer John Roselli, who was told to inform Davis that he must stop seeing Novak. To try to scare Davis, Roselli had him kidnapped for a few hours. Another account relates that the threat was conveyed to Davis's father by mobster Mickey Cohen.

The threat message to Davis was "leave Novak and marry a Black woman, or you’ll lose your other eye". In response, Davis sought the protection of Chicago mobster Sam Giancana, who said that he could protect him in Chicago and Las Vegas but not California. Cohn was one of the inspirations (as well as Louis B. Mayer) for the character of studio boss Jack Woltz in the 1972 crime film The Godfather.

== Death ==
Cohn had been suffering from an enlarged heart when he had a heart attack while flying back from New York in December 1957. He was told to slow down. In February 1958, he suffered another heart attack at the Arizona Biltmore Hotel in Phoenix, Arizona, shortly after he had finished dinner. Cohn died in an ambulance en route to St. Joseph's Hospital.

Practically the entire Hollywood community attended Cohn's extravagant funeral on stage 12 at the Columbia studios where Red Skelton made the famous (possibly apocryphal) quote: "It proves what Harry always said: Give the public what they want and they'll come out for it." Cohn is interred in the Hollywood Forever Cemetery in Hollywood.

== Media portrayal ==
Cohn was portrayed by Michael Lerner in the 1983 TV film Rita Hayworth: The Love Goddess, Linal Haft in The Three Stooges bio drama in 2000, and Eric Roberts in the 2018 film Frank & Ava.

== Sources ==
- Bob Thomas, King Cohn.
- Bernard F. Dick, The Merchant Prince of Poverty Row.
