= Dorothy Ann Seese =

American film actress (1935–2015)

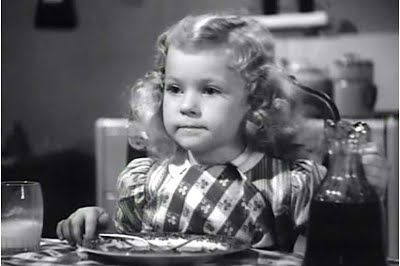
- image Seese as Phronzie Pepper in the film series The Five Little Peppers
- Born: July 10, 1935; Los Angeles, California, US
- Died: December 11, 2015 (aged 80); Phoenix, Arizona, US
- Other name: "Dottie"
- Education: BLA UCLA (1955)
- Occupations: Child actress (formerly); Business systems analyst (formerly); Legal secretary; Legal assistant; Paralegal
- Known for: Phronsie Pepper in the series Five Little Peppers
- Parents: Lloyd Seese (father); Swan Seese (mother)

Dorothy Ann "Dottie" Seese (July 10, 1935 - December 11, 2015) was an American former child actress, former business systems analyst, legal secretary and paralegal. She was most famously known for playing the role of Phronsie Pepper in the series Five Little Peppers, appearing in four films in the series. She was believed to be the last surviving cast member of the series until her death in 2015. She was also remarked as "having the potential of child actress Shirley Temple".

== Early life ==
Dorothy Ann Seese was born on July 10, 1935 in Los Angeles, California, to Lloyd Seese, a movie technician, and Swan Seese. When Dorothy was 2 months old, her mother abandoned her and left Dorothy to the care of her grandmother, only returning later when Seese gained reputation in Hollywood pictures.

== Career ==
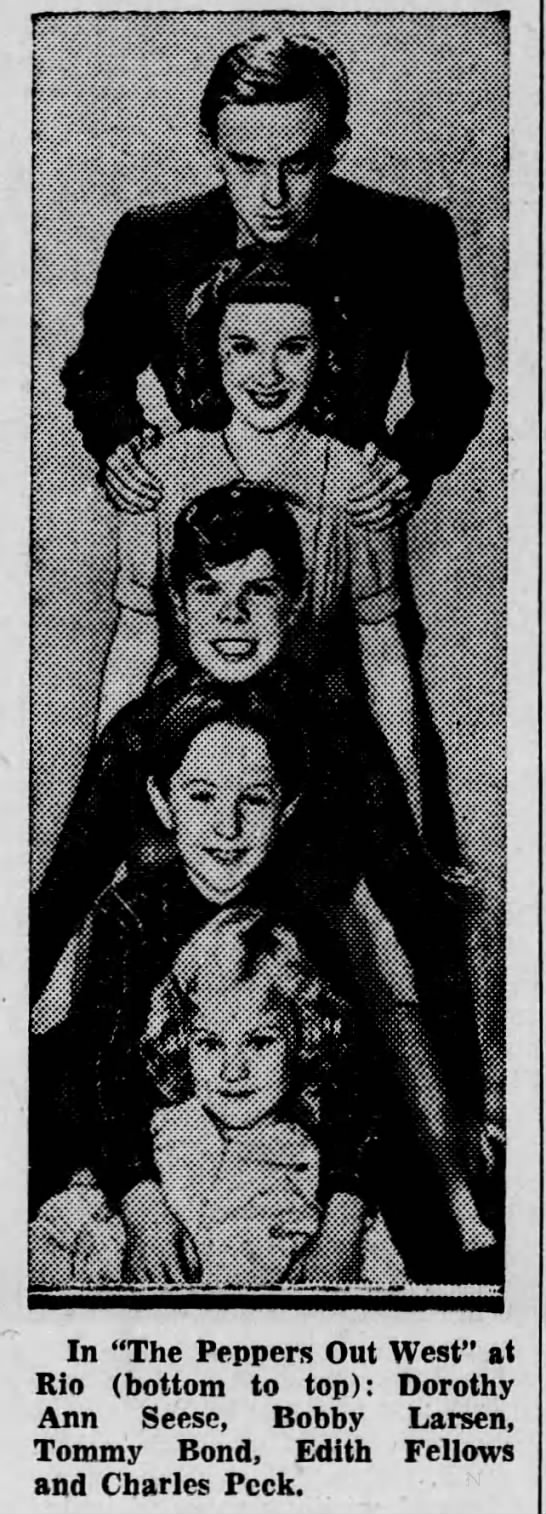
Cast of the film series The Three Little Peppers in a May 4, 1940, article from The Morning News paper, Wilmington, Delaware

Seese started her acting career in the late 1930s, amid the Golden Age of Hollywood when studios like Columbia Pictures frequently featured young performers in family-oriented serials and features. She made her screen debut at the age of four in the 1939 Columbia Pictures film, Five Little Peppers and How They Grew, playing the role of the youngest family member, Phronsie Pepper. She reprised her role as Phronsie in 3 sequel entries of the series: Five Little Peppers at Home (1940), Out West with the Peppers (1940), and Five Little Peppers in Trouble (1940). This role launched her brief career as a child actress, aligning with the era's trend of casting local children in wholesome, low-budget productions aimed at young audiences. Seese's role in the series established her as a recognizable figure in Columbia's slate of family films during 1939 and 1940. Seese played the role of Phronsie in all four entries of the short-lived series, which served as vehicles for juvenile performers and loosely adapted Margaret Sidney's children's books. Seese's role in The Five Little Peppers represented her primary and most prominent acting credits as a child performer. Seese also was a USO entertainer during World War II. Seese went on to perform in other Hollywood films, for which she was lesser known, including The Virginian, The Bounty Hunter, and The Long Gray Line.

== Post-acting career and later life ==
After concluding her brief acting career in the early 1950s, Dorothy Ann Seese pursued higher education and established professional careers in other fields. She earned a liberal arts degree from the University of California, Los Angeles in 1955. She then worked as a business systems analyst for fifteen years before transitioning to the legal sector, working for the next twenty-five years as a legal secretary and paralegal. Seese retired in 1997 due to disability caused by a spinal injury. She resided in Sun City, Arizona during her later years and lived in The Sun City Retirement Community, a retirement home in the Phoenix area. During her later years, she distanced herself from immediate relatives due to the circumstances in her life growing up, although she reportedly was visited by a relative during her final months. She pursued a hobby as a freelance political writer for Patch Work Papers and a conservative political commentator, writing freelance columns for several conservative websites. This gave Seese a focus after her professional career ended. During her professional career, it was found that in 1958, her father Lloyd Seese was convicted for the murder of 25-year old Lawrence Wilder, a bartender at the Worcester Club. Seese never married and had no children although she had a boyfriend, Lieutenant James, who was killed in a plane crash in July 1958, the day before her father's arrest. As a result of hearing the news, Seese turned to Christianity and writing, maintaining a strong Christian faith throughout the rest of her life and finding solace in writing.

== Death ==
Seese died from cancer on December 11, 2015, at the age of 80.

== Filmography ==
Credits

Year	Title	Role	Notes
1939	Five Little Peppers and How They Grew	Phronsie Pepper	soundtrack: "Happy Birthday to You" (uncredited)
1940	Five Little Peppers at Home	Phronsie Pepper	
1940	Meet the Missus	Millie Lou	
1940	Out West with the Peppers	Phronsie Pepper	
1940	Five Little Peppers in Trouble	Phronsie Pepper	
1940	The Doctor Takes a Wife	Farmer Joe's daughter	uncredited
1941	Blondie in Society	Little Girl Living Across the Street	uncredited
1942	Blondie's Blessed Event	Little Girl	uncredited
1943	Two Weeks to Live	Dorothy	uncredited
1943	Let's Have Fun	Toni Gilbert	
1946	The Virginian	Jane Wood	uncredited
1954	The Bounty Hunter	Ed's Sister	uncredited
1955	The Long Gray Line	Irish immigrant	
