= Dorothy Peterson =

American actress

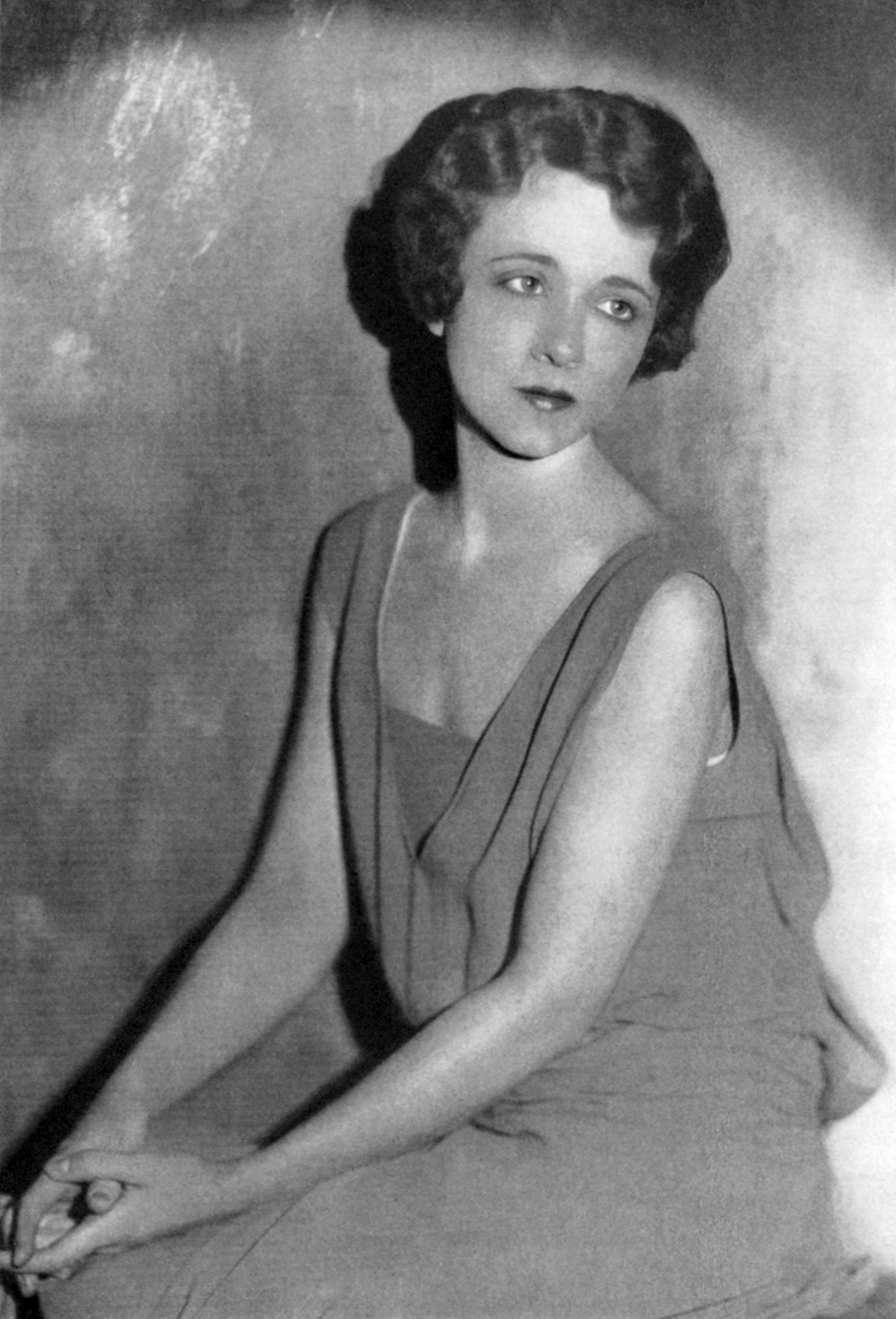
- Peterson in 1928
- Born: Bergetta Peterson; December 25, 1897; Hector, Minnesota, U.S.
- Died: October 3, 1979 (aged 81); New York City, U.S.
- Burial place: Mount Olivet Cemetery, Zion, Illinois
- Occupation: Actress
- Years active: 1924–1964
- Spouse: Guinn "Big Boy" Williams (m. 1943; died 1962)
- Parents: Oscar Frank Peterson (father); Emily Johnson Peterson (mother)

Bergetta "Dorothy" Peterson (December 25, 1897 – October 3, 1979) was an American actress. She began her acting career on Broadway before appearing in more than eighty Hollywood films.

== Early years ==
Peterson was born in Hector, Minnesota, the daughter of Oscar Frank Peterson and Emily Johnson Peterson. She had a brother, Buford, and was raised in Zion, Illinois. She was of Swedish ancestry. She studied at a dramatic school, performing in adaptations of Greek plays, and then attended the Chicago Musical College.

== Career ==
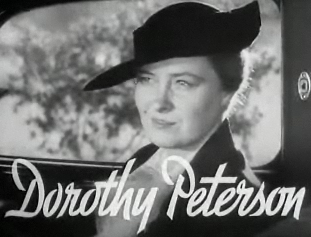
Dorothy Peterson in Pursuit (1935)

Billed by her birth name, Peterson acted with a company in Icebound at the Montauk Theater in Brooklyn, New York, in September 1923. For two years, Peterson toured with Borgony Hammer's Ibsen Repertory Company. She left that troupe to go to New York, where she began performing in Broadway productions. Broadway plays in which she acted included Subway Express (1929), Dracula (1927), God Loves Us (1926), Pomeroy's Past (1926), Find Daddy (1926), The Fall Guy (1925), All God's Chillun Got Wings (1924), and Cobra (1924).

She made her screen debut in Mothers Cry (1930), a domestic drama that required the 29-year-old actress to age nearly three decades in the course of the film.

== Death ==
Peterson died on October 3, 1979. She was buried in Mount Olivet Cemetery in Zion, Illinois.

== Filmography ==
- Mothers Cry (1930) - Mary Williams
- Up for Murder (1931) - Mrs. Marshall
- Party Husband (1931) - Kate
- Traveling Husbands (1931) - Martha Hall
- The Reckless Hour (1931) - Mrs. Susie Jennison
- Bought! (1931) - Mrs. Dale
- Penrod and Sam (1931) - Mrs. Schofield
- Skyline (1931) - Rose Breen
- Way Back Home (1931) - Rose Clark
- Rich Man's Folly (1931) - Katherine Trumbull
- Emma (1932) - Mrs. Winthrop (uncredited)
- Forbidden (1932) - Helen
- The Beast of the City (1932) - Mary Fitzpatrick
- She Wanted a Millionaire (1932) - Mrs. Miller
- Business and Pleasure (1932) - Mrs. Jane Olsen Tinker
- So Big! (1932) - Maartje Pool
- When a Feller Needs a Friend (1932) - Mrs. Margaret Randall
- Night World (1932) - Edith Blair
- Attorney for the Defense (1932) - Mrs. Wallace
- Thrill of Youth (1932) - Seena Sherwood
- Life Begins (1932) - A Patient
- The Cabin in the Cotton (1932) - Lilly Blake
- Payment Deferred (1932) - Annie Marble
- Call Her Savage (1932) - Silas' Wife
- The Billion Dollar Scandal (1933) - Mrs. Jackson (scenes deleted)
- Reform Girl (1933) - Mrs. Putnam
- Hold Me Tight (1933) - Mary Shane (uncredited)
- The Mayor of Hell (1933) - Mrs. Smith
- I'm No Angel (1933) - Thelma
- Big Executive (1933) - Mrs. Sarah Conway
- Beloved (1934) - Baroness Irene von Hausmann
- As the Earth Turns (1934) - Mil
- Men in White (1934) - Nurse Mary (uncredited)
- Uncertain Lady (1934) - Cicily Prentiss
- Side Streets (1934) - Mrs. Richards
- Treasure Island (1934) - Mrs. Hawkins
- Peck's Bad Boy (1934) - Aunt Lily Clay
- Society Doctor (1935) - Mrs. Harrigan
- Sweepstake Annie (1935) - Mrs. Henry Foster
- Laddie (1935) - Mrs. Stanton
- Pursuit (1935) - Mrs. McCoy
- Freckles (1935) - Mrs. Duncan
- Man of Iron (1935) - Bessie Bennett
- The Country Doctor (1936) - Nurse Katherine Kennedy
- The Devil Is a Sissy (1936) - Mrs. Jennie Stevens (uncredited)
- Reunion (1936) - Katherine Kennedy
- Under Cover of Night (1937) - Susan Nash
- Her Husband Lies (1937) - Dorothy Powell
- Girl Loves Boy (1937) - Mrs. McCarthy
- Confession (1937) - Mrs. Koslov
- 52nd Street (1937) - Adela Rondell
- Hunted Men (1938) - Mary Harris
- Breaking the Ice (1938) - Annie Decker
- Girls on Probation (1938) - Jane Lennox
- The Flying Irishman (1939) - Mrs. Edith Corrigan - Doug's Mother (uncredited)
- Dark Victory (1939) - Miss Wainwright
- Five Little Peppers and How They Grew (1939) - Mrs. Pepper
- Two Bright Boys (1939) - Kathleen O'Donnell
- Sabotage (1939) - Edith Grayson
- Five Little Peppers at Home (1940) - Mrs. Pepper
- Too Many Husbands (1940) - Gertrude Houlihan
- Lillian Russell (1940) - Cynthia Leonard
- Women in War (1940) - Sister Frances
- Out West with the Peppers (1940) - Mrs. Pepper
- Five Little Peppers in Trouble (1940) - Mrs. Pepper
- Ride, Kelly, Ride (1941) - Mrs. Martin
- Cheers for Miss Bishop (1941) - Mrs. Bishop
- Henry Aldrich for President (1941) - Mrs. Aldrich
- Uncle Joe (1941) - Margaret Day
- Saboteur (1942) - Mrs. Mason
- The Man in the Trunk (1942) - Lola DeWinters
- Air Force (1943) - Mrs. Chester (uncredited)
- The Moon Is Down (1943) - Mother (uncredited)
- This Is the Army (1943) - Mrs. Nelson
- This Is the Life (1944) - Aunt Betsy
- Mr. Skeffington (1944) - Manby
- When the Lights Go on Again (1944) - Mrs. Clara Benson
- The Woman in the Window (1944) - Mrs. Wanley
- Faces in the Fog (1944) - Mrs. Mason
- Canyon Passage (1946) - Mrs. Dance (uncredited)
- Sister Kenny (1946) - Agnes
- That Hagen Girl (1947) - Minta Hagen
- Escala en Hi-Fi (1963)
