= Out West with the Peppers =

1940 film

- Directed by: Charles Barton
- Screenplay by: Harry Sauber
- Based on: Out West with the Peppers by Margaret Sidney
- Produced by: Jack Fier
- Starring: Edith Fellows; Charles Peck; Tommy Bond; Bobby Larson; Pierre Watkin; Ronald Sinclair
- Cinematography: Benjaman H. Kline
- Edited by: James Sweeney
- Music by: Sidney Cutner
- Production company: Columbia Pictures
- Distributed by: Columbia Pictures
- Release date: June 30, 1940
- Running time: 62 minutes
- Country: United States
- Language: English

Out West with the Peppers is a 1940 American Western comedy film, directed by Charles Barton and produced by Jack Fier. It is the third film in the Five Little Peppers series.

== Plot ==
Mrs. Pepper falls ill, and is told by her doctor to move to a higher climate. Polly writes to their Aunt Alice in Oregon, and secures an invitation for the family to live with her — although Alice's husband Jim is not happy about the intrusion.

== Cast ==
- Edith Fellows as Polly Pepper
- Charles Peck as Ben Pepper
- Tommy Bond as Joey Pepper
- Bobby Larson as Davie Pepper
- Dorothy Ann Seese as Phronsie Pepper
- Pierre Watkin as Mr King
- Ronald Sinclair as Jasper
- Dorothy Peterson as Mrs Pepper
- Victor Kilian as Jim Anderson
- Helen Brown as Alice Anderson
- Emory Parnell as Ole
- Walter Soderling as Caleb
- Roger Gray as Tom
- Hal Price as Bill
- Ernie Adams as Oscar
- André Cheron as Frenchman
- Rex Evans as Martin
- Eddie Laughton as Lumberjack
- John Rogers as Ship Steward
- Kathryn Sheldon as Abbie

== Reception ==
On July 10, 1940, Variety wrote, "Third of the series. The most inferior of the lot. Tasteless fare from beginning to end."

== See also ==
- Five Little Peppers and How They Grew
- Five Little Peppers at Home
- Five Little Peppers in Trouble
