= Sidney Mason Stone =

American architect (1803–1882)

- Sidney Mason Stone
- Born: May 8, 1803; Milford, Connecticut
- Died: August 10, 1882 (aged 79); New Haven, Connecticut
- Occupation: Architect

Sidney Mason Stone (May 8, 1803 – August 10, 1882) was a prominent Connecticut architect and builder known for designs of churches, institutional buildings and residences. His creations incorporated Greek Revival, Romanesque, Gothic, Italianate and other styles popular in the 19th century. He served in several civic capacities in the city of New Haven and statewide and as mentor to Yale students prior to the establishment of that university's School of Architecture. He was the father of Harriet Mulford Stone, better known to readers of children's literature as Margaret Sidney, creator of the Five Little Peppers series.

== Biography ==
Sidney Mason Stone was born in what was then Orange, Connecticut, and is now part of Milford, Connecticut, to Samuel Stone and Mary (Polly) Woodruff, proprietors of the Woodruff Tavern, a popular stopping point for travelers on the Boston Post Road. The Stone and Woodruff family lineages trace back to numerous Connecticut patriots and clergymen including Rev. Thomas Hooker and Rev. Samuel Stone, founders of the Connecticut Colony and the city of Hartford and Robert Treat, Governor of the Connecticut Colony between 1683 and 1698, as well as to the Mayflower Pilgrims. Sidney Mason Stone had one brother, Benjamin Woodruff Stone (1808-1891). Mary and Samuel Stone were divorced in 1816. Sidney and Benjamin were baptized in the Orange Congregational Church (built by David Hoadley (architect) in 1810 and now part of the Orange Center Historic District (Orange, Connecticut)) on 5 February 1821. Benjamin eventually became a merchant tailor and, for several decades, operated a shop in New Haven, Connecticut. Mary Stone married William Woodruff, in 1829. She died in 1854.

Sidney Mason Stone married Abigail Treat, daughter of Stephen Atwater Treat and Cornelia H. Bull of Milford, CT on April 20, 1830, in New Haven. She bore five children —Mary L. (born 1832), William W. (born 1833), Harriet T. (born 1836 who died as an infant), Sidney M., Jr. (born 1838) who drowned in a boating accident on Lake Saltonstall (Connecticut) at the age of 24 and Abigail (born 1841). She died on January 17, 1841, at the age of 29.

On September 14, 1843, Stone married Harriet Mulford daughter of Hervey Mulford and Nancy Bradley of New Haven They had two daughters, Harriet M. (born 1844) and Julia M. (born 1853). Harriet grew up to be the bestselling author of the Five Little Peppers children's series, although her fame did not come until after her father's death. In her later years she confided that when she first learned she was to become a published author she decided to use a pen name in deference to her father who she said “looked with disfavor on young women who wrote for publication”. She chose the name 'Margaret Sidney', taking his first name as her last in his honor.

Like many architects and builders of the time, scant information is available regarding Stone's professional education. His obituary, says that he moved to New Haven at the age of 19 to “learn the joiners’ trade”. Elizabeth Mills Brown elaborates, "He began as an itinerant carpenter and worked his way up through the building trades." However, George Dudley Seymour, in his 1942 volume, New Haven, says, “After working ten years or so as a master-builder and contractor, Stone determined to devote himself exclusively to the business of an architect, preparing and drawing specifications and superintending work in behalf of the owner. To better qualify himself for this work he took a short course of study at the New York University.” This assertion is borne out by early records from New York University which include Stone among the institution's first enrolled students in 1832. In that same year, the renowned civil engineer, David Bates Douglass was hired by the fledgling university as Professor of Natural Philosophy and Civil Engineering (a title which was eventually changed to Professor of Civil Engineering and Architecture). Since, at the time, the school had no other faculty teaching architecture or related subjects, the conclusion can be drawn that Stone studied under Douglass who, along with Ithiel Town and Alexander Jackson Davis, also contributed to the building designs for NYU.

Stone remained in New Haven throughout his long career. According to Jerome Lucke's History of the New Haven Grays, Stone, who headed the booklet's publication committee in 1876, was, at that time, "one of our most prominent and wealthy men, his property being largely in real estate in this city [New Haven] and Meriden. Much of his time is spent in the care and management of his property. " Luckes went on to describe Stone as, "Still young looking and active, and as erect as when he carried a sword in front of the Grays many years ago."

Six years later, in 1882, Stone died in his New Haven home at age 79. He was buried in Grove Street Cemetery. After his death many of his numerous real estate holdings were sold to pay off claims against his estate amounting to $77,843.

== Credited works ==
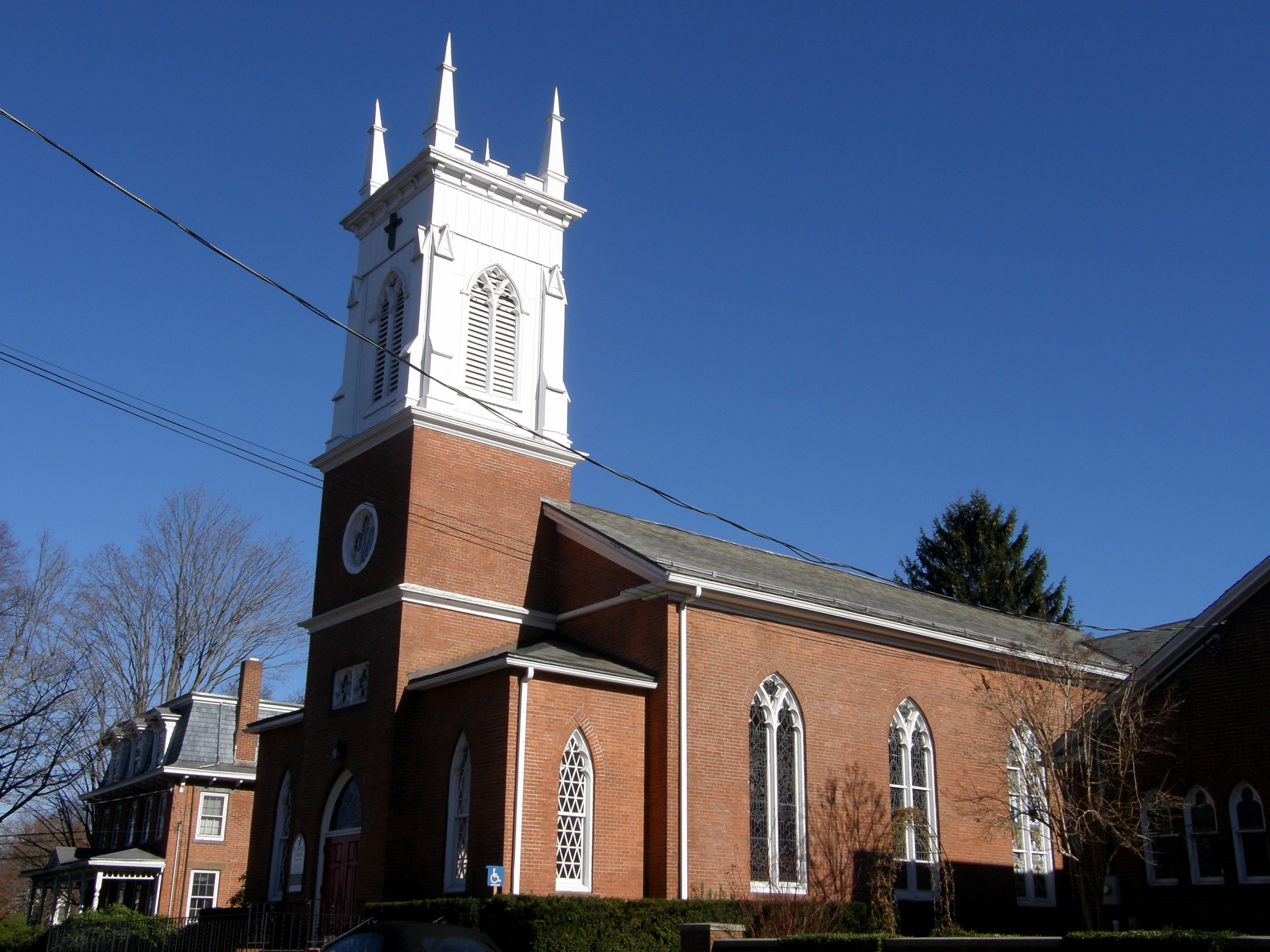
St. John's Episcopal Church, North Haven, CT (1834)

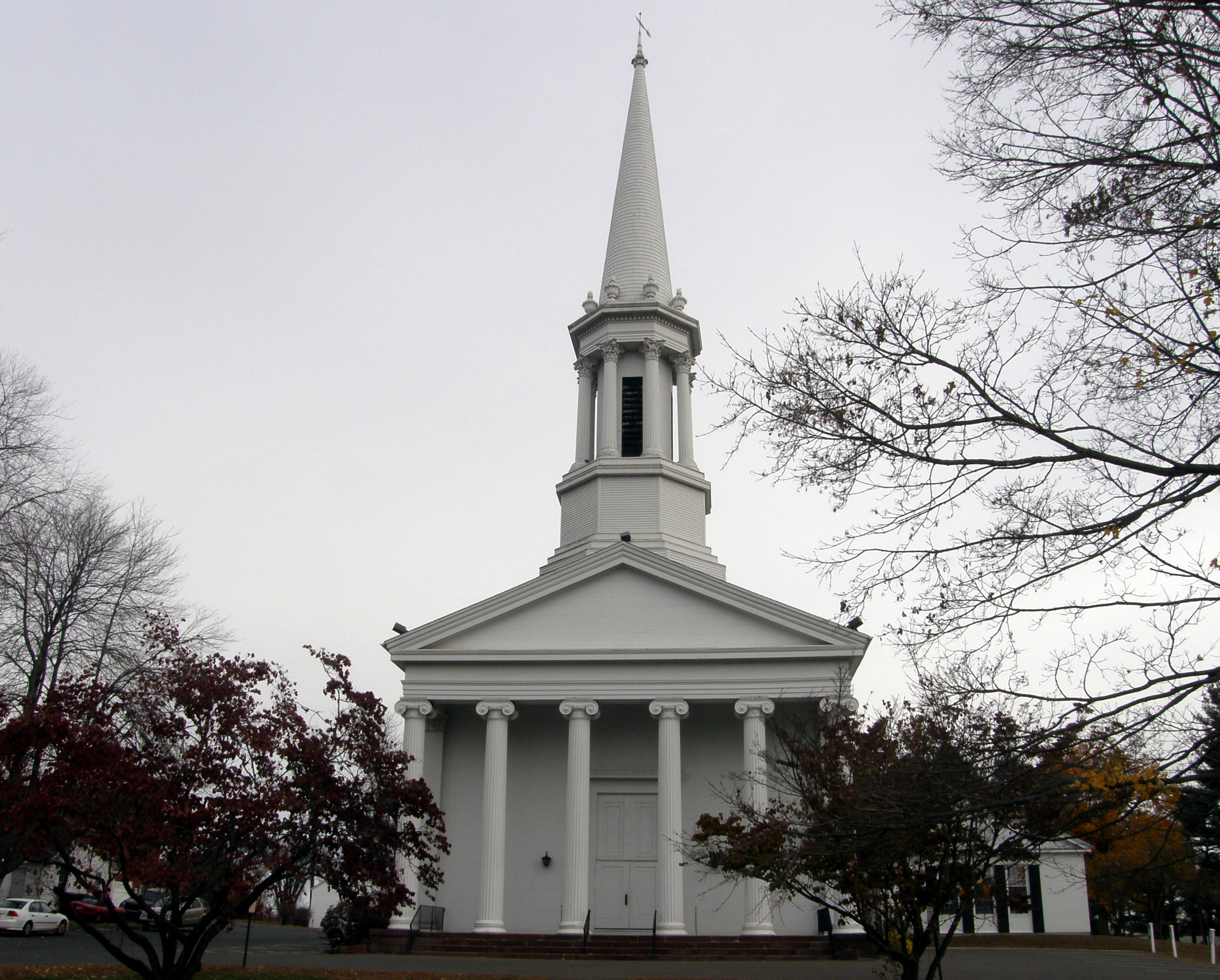
Congregational Church, Enfield, CT (1848)

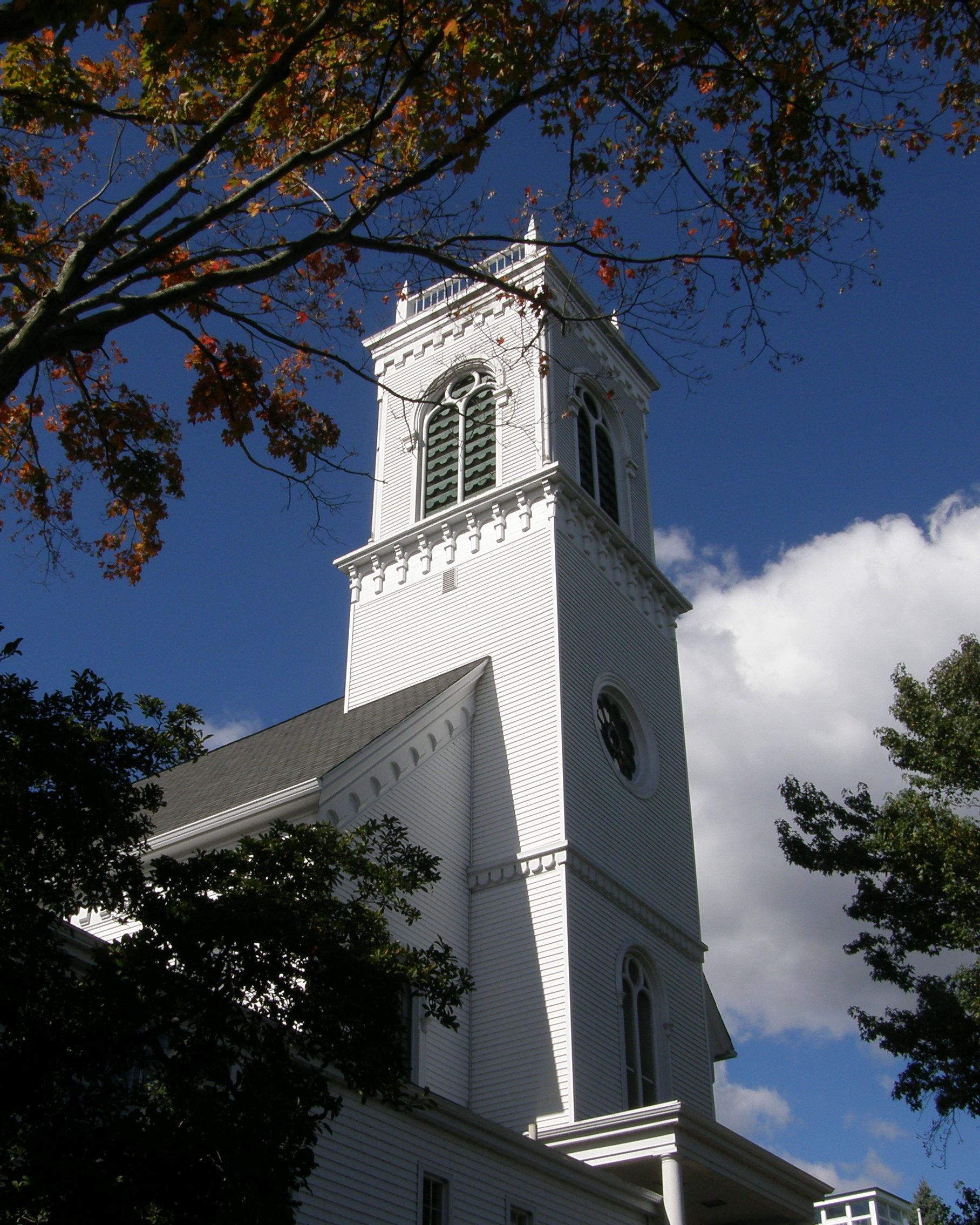
First Congregational Church, Essex, CT (1852)

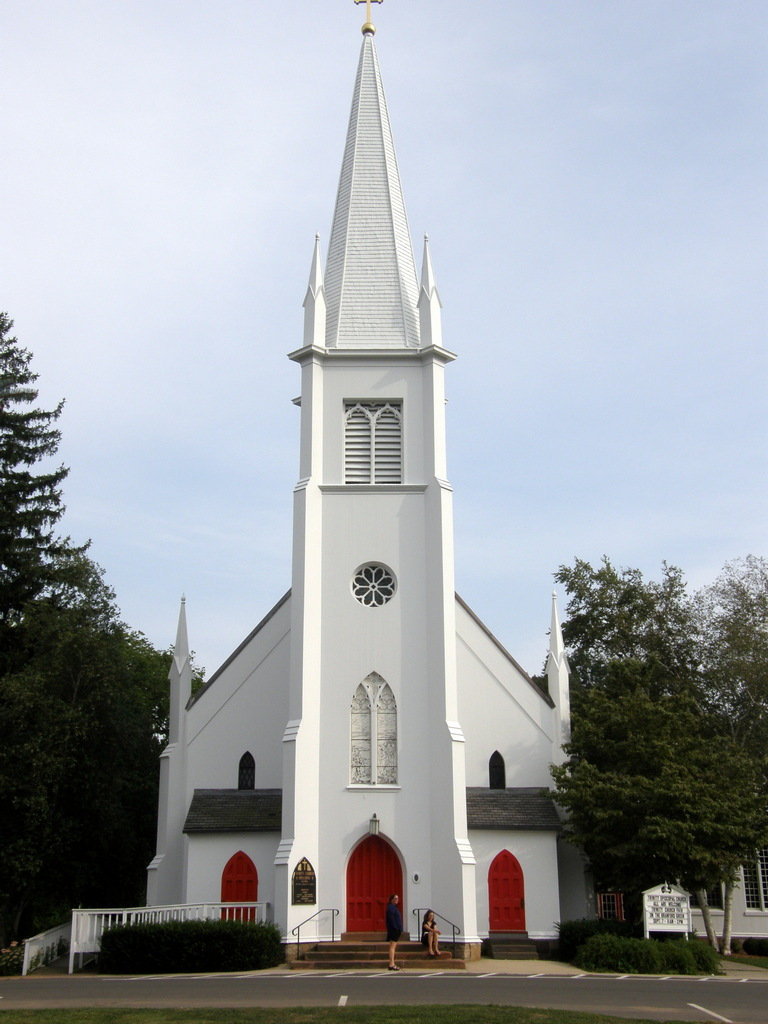
Trinity Episcopal Church, Branford, CT (1852)

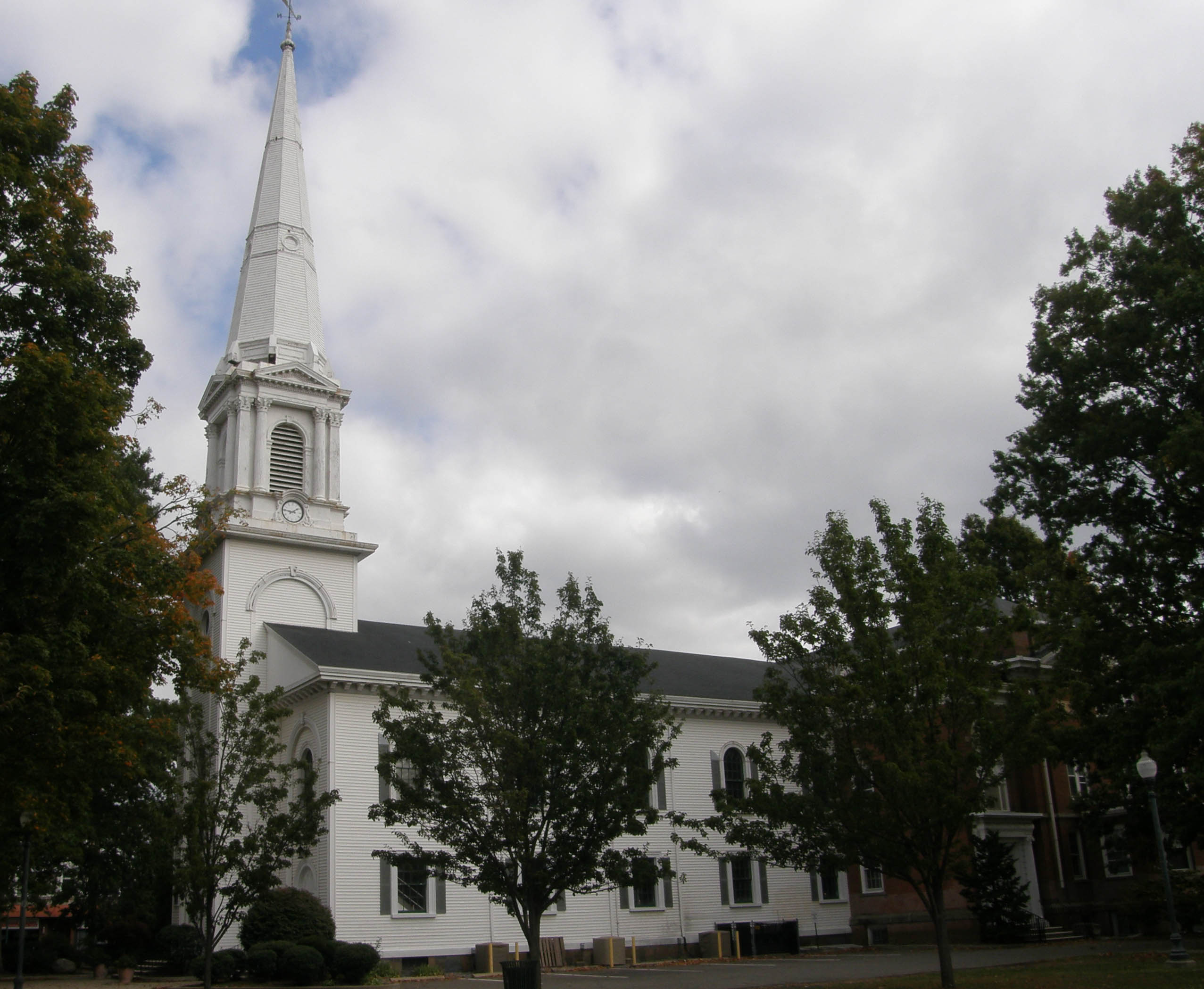
First Congregational Church, West Haven, CT (1859)

=== Churches ===
According to The History of the New Haven Grays, Stone was the designer of "more than one hundred churches in various parts of the country...churches in almost every State in the Union”. One of Stone's first (1829) attributed works was as contractor and master builder for New Haven's St. Paul's Chapel a 2-towered Gothic structure built of East Haven sandstone which was reportedly designed by Sherman Croswell, son of the long-time rector of New Haven's Trinity Church, Rev. Dr. Harry Croswell. Although Stone's name has been given as "probable architect" of the Center Congregational Church in Meriden (1830) citing the influence of Ithiel Town's sensibilities on the design as justification for the attribution, it is unlikely that Stone would have assumed the responsibilities of architect for such an ambitious project this early in his career, particularly given the fact that it was not until two years later—in 1832—that he attended NYU to, in his own words, "prepare himself" for such duties. It was also not until 1832 that advertisements first began to appear in the local newspapers offering Stone's services as an architect which superseded his earlier (1829 and 1830) listings as joiner/builder. His earliest authenticated church designs include St. John's Episcopal Church, North Haven, CT (1834), the Westville Society Meeting House (1835) and the Third Congregational Church, Court Street (1841).

Stone went on to design the Congregational Church, Enfield, CT(1848) which was set on cut brownstone foundations, constructed of wood in the Greek Revival style with a portico of six Ionic columns. The finished building included frescos by New York City artists Molini and Allegri. The Connecticut Courant of February 24, 1849, commented, "The church reflects great credit upon the architect and builder," while Charles Albert Wright, in his book Some Old Time Meeting Houses of the Connecticut Valley wrote, "The Church is regarded by many as one of the best examples of colonial architecture in New England." Stone's Corner Congregational Church, Meriden, CT (1849) is said to have employed a similar design. The College Street Church, New Haven (1848) --one of his most successful designs, according to Seymour-- was later used by Yale University as College Street Hall until it was privately purchased in 1895 to become the ill-fated Rialto Theatre which was destroyed in a tragic fire in 1921.

For the Fourth Congregational Church, Hartford, CT (1850) Stone was directed by the building committee to copy Town's Center Church on the New Haven Green. Although a new site for the Hartford church was eventually secured on Albany Avenue, the building that was erected there in 1913 retained the steeple, portico and doors from Stone's original edifice. His First Unitarian Church, Worcester, MA (1850) was also modeled after New Haven's Center Church. This building was largely destroyed in the 1938 New England hurricane, when the steeple collapsed onto the roof, blowing out the walls. The church was rebuilt in 1939 to the original design by Worcester architect G. Adolph Johnson.

These were followed by South Congregational Church, New Haven (1851) (later Church of the Sacred Heart), built in what is now the Trowbridge Square Historic District; Trinity Episcopal Church, Branford, CT (1852), fashioned of ship's siding lumber in the English Gothic style; First Congregational Church, Essex, CT (1852); St. Patrick's Church, New Haven (1853) constructed of East Haven sandstone;First Congregational Church, Naugatuck, CT (1855) and Wooster Place Congregational Church, Wooster Square, New Haven (1855) (now the Church of St. Michael) the original design for which featured a Corinthian portico and tall steeple. In New Haven: A Guide to Architecture and Urban Design, Brown remarks on St. Michael's, “The building has burned twice, the steeple blown down once...Only the side walls and tall arched windows preserve the memory of 1855.”

Stone was also responsible for designing the Third Congregational Church, Church Street, (1856), “a brownstone fabricated in a pseudo Norman style" which was "remodeled in 1890...for use as a Public Library;” the Second Presbyterian Church, Columbus, Ohio (1857), a Romanesque Revival design also constructed of sandstone; the First Congregational Church, West Haven, CT(1859); and a church built for the Whitewater Congregational Society, Grand Traverse County, MI (1866) which, it appears, is now the Williamsburg Methodist Church in Grand Traverse County.

In addition, Stone was hired to remodel the interior of the United Congregational Church (North Church) on the New Haven Green in 1849. This was the church which Stone and his family regularly attended and where he served as deacon. It was originally designed by Ebenezer Johnson and built by David Hoadley in 1814 Stone's modifications included the construction of the apse in which the pulpit stands.

Although only a few of the far-flung churches alluded to by Lucke are currently known, credence is lent to the possibility that more of Stone's work exists outside of Connecticut by the fact that the family was said to have traveled widely throughout the country during Harriet M. Stone's youth. The probability that Stone was working elsewhere would also account for the diminishing number of his designs that appeared in New Haven during the 1860s and 1870s. Among Stone's few extant drawings is one that is labeled, "Transverse section, Kansas Church 48-610". It is known that the current St. Paul and St. James Church (originally St. Paul's Chapel, for which Stone served as contractor in 1829) sponsored early Episcopal missionary work in Kansas, prompting the hypothesis that Stone's design may have been elicited through this connection. Additionally, notes collected by W.G. Snow from interviews with architects Henry L. Gay of Chicago and L.W. Robinson of New Haven in 1937 include the First Baptist Church, Paterson, New Jersey (1859–60) as one of Stone's designs.

=== Public, commercial and academic buildings ===
In 1833 Stone was listed as builder of Ithiel Town's 13-bed Connecticut General Hospital in New Haven. A June 1845 article on improvements in New Haven published in the New York Herald cited Stone's five story Townsend Block Building at the corner of Chapel and College Streets and the store of E. Marble (in which Stone soon located his own offices) as the finest of the new buildings, saying Stone "stands high as an architect and builder."

Stone was commissioned to design an entrance gate for the Town of East Haven's Cemetery in 1849, the idea for which was perhaps inspired by the fact that the Henry Austin gate had been recently installed at New Haven's Grove Street Cemetery. Stone's four-story design for Dawson and Douglas, Sugar Refiners (1854) on State Street in New Haven, was described in the Columbian Register as “faced with Portland stone, with iron doors, designed to be both burglar proof and fire proof”. W.G. Snow, in his unpublished notes, credits Stone with the design for the Hartford Railroad Station (1852). In the same year, the New Haven Palladium announced that Stone was to be the architect of the new Guilford High School(which would become The Guilford Institute) to be built of a 'fine gray stone...resembling Quincy granite' that was quarried from a ledge within fifty feet of the building's site. The school building later housed the Shoreline Times offices and was recently converted to luxury condominiums called The Lofts at Griffings Square″ The renovated property has retained much of Stone's original styling including the signature Italianate cupola.

Although, in recent writings the design of the New Haven Orphan Asylum (1855) has been attributed to Henry Austin, both History of the New Haven Grays and the WPA Architectural Survey (1935–1942) list it among Stone's works, while Barber's History and Antiquities of New Haven, Conn mentions that Stone "gave his services gratuitously" for its design.

Stone's plans for the New Haven City Jail (1857) which featured an Italianate tower rising from the center of the structure were executed at a site on Whalley Avenue. Within the building Stone employed a new ventilation system that operated by "admitting pure air through an external wall". On December 18, 1860, Stone was issued US Patent 30938 A for this system which he described as useful for "a building or a vessel". In the same year his invention was also granted a patent in Great Britain. The patent has been referenced in later U.S. applications as recently as 1999.

Stone was the architect for both the Alms House in New Haven and the State Reform School in Meriden, CT as well as the original Yale Gymnasium (1859) (later used as a dining hall for up to 450 students and, after 1902, as the Herrick Psychological Hall until it was demolished in 1917) and the first Yale Medical School Building (1860). He also produced plans for the New Haven City Hall which were seriously considered although it was Henry Austin who ultimately designed the building that was erected in 1860-62.

=== Residences ===
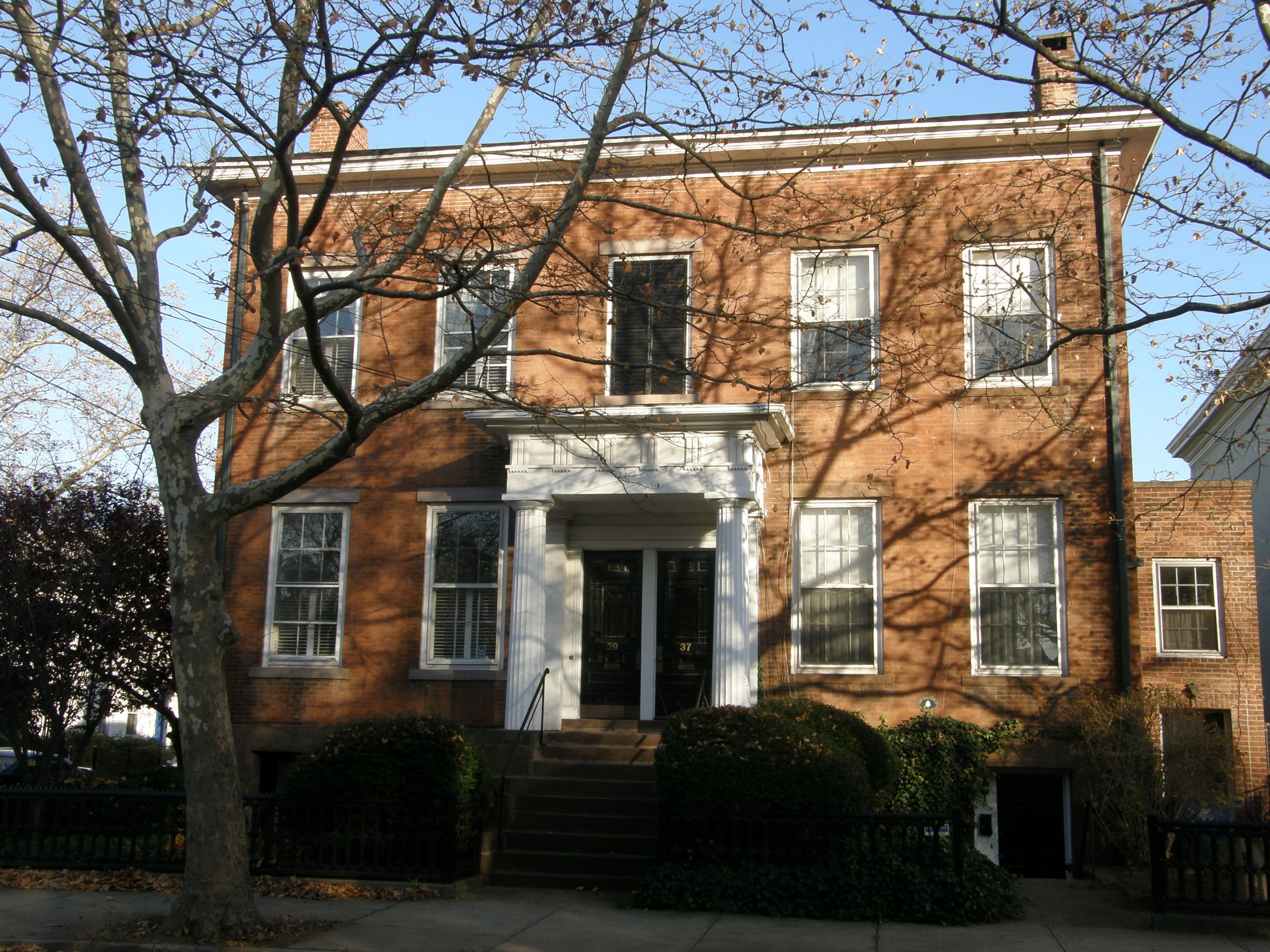
Mayor John B. Robertson House, New Haven, CT (c. 1833)

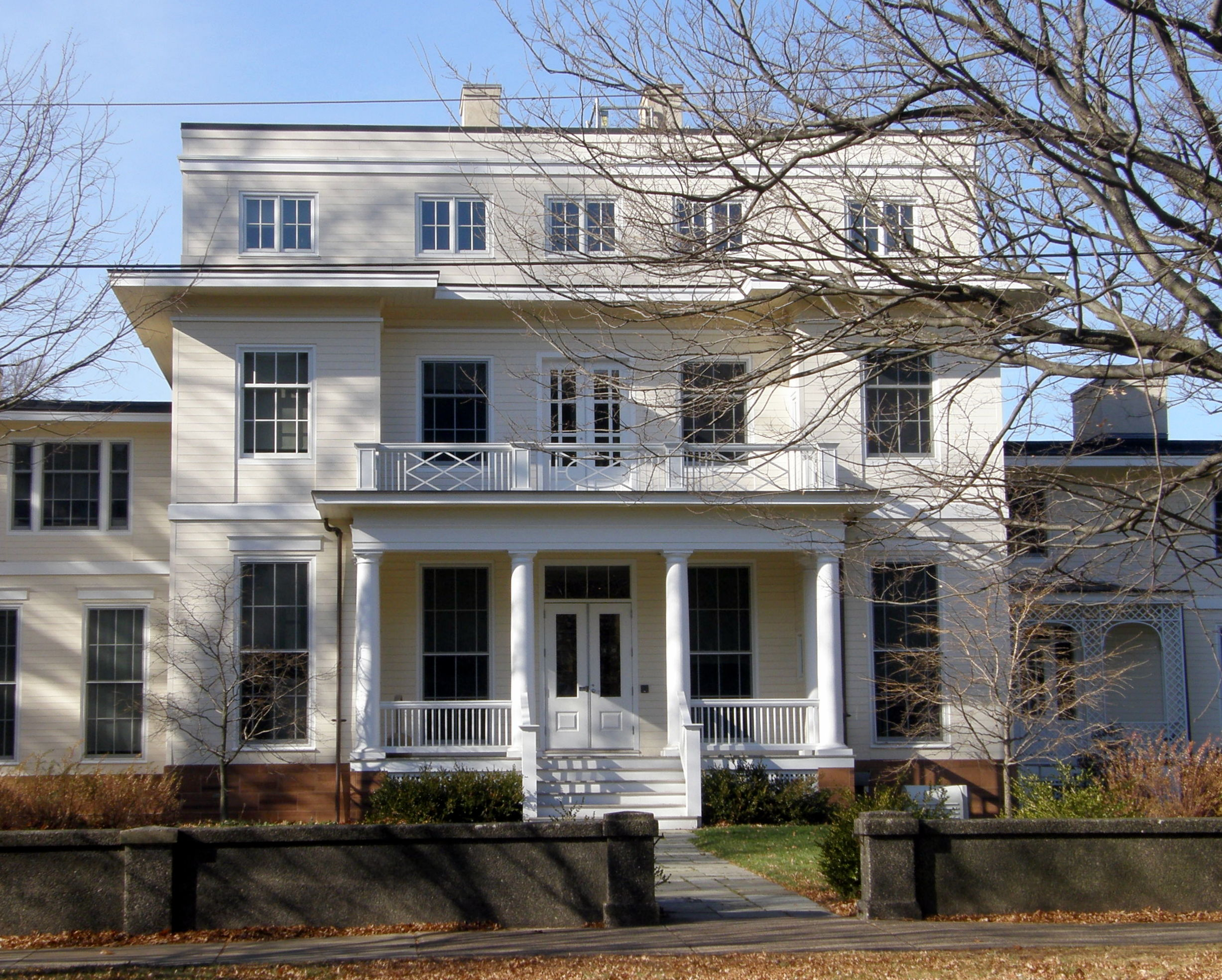
John North House, now Anthropology Dept., Yale University, New Haven, CT (1836)

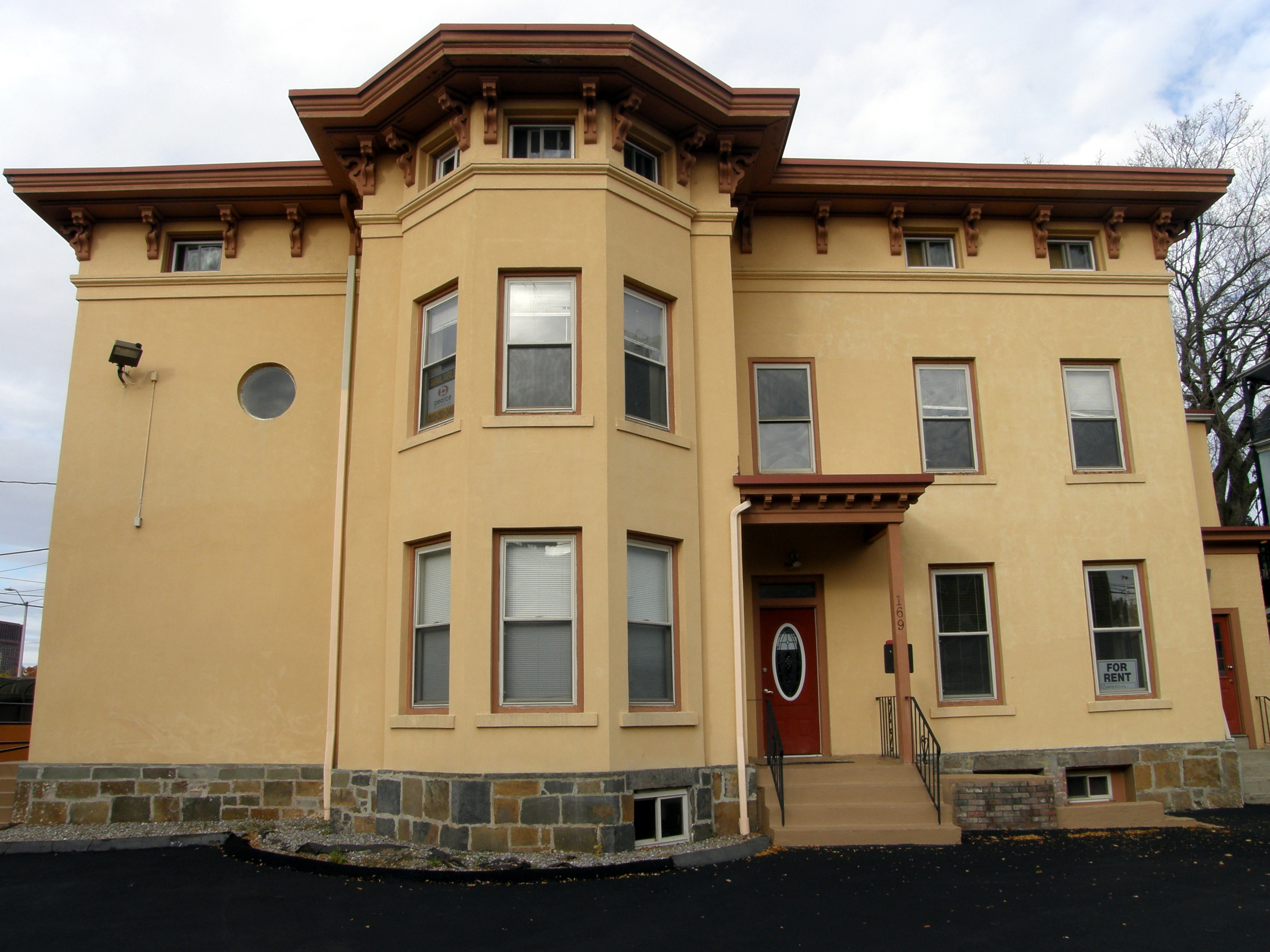
S. M. Stone Residence, Olive Street, New Haven (1848)

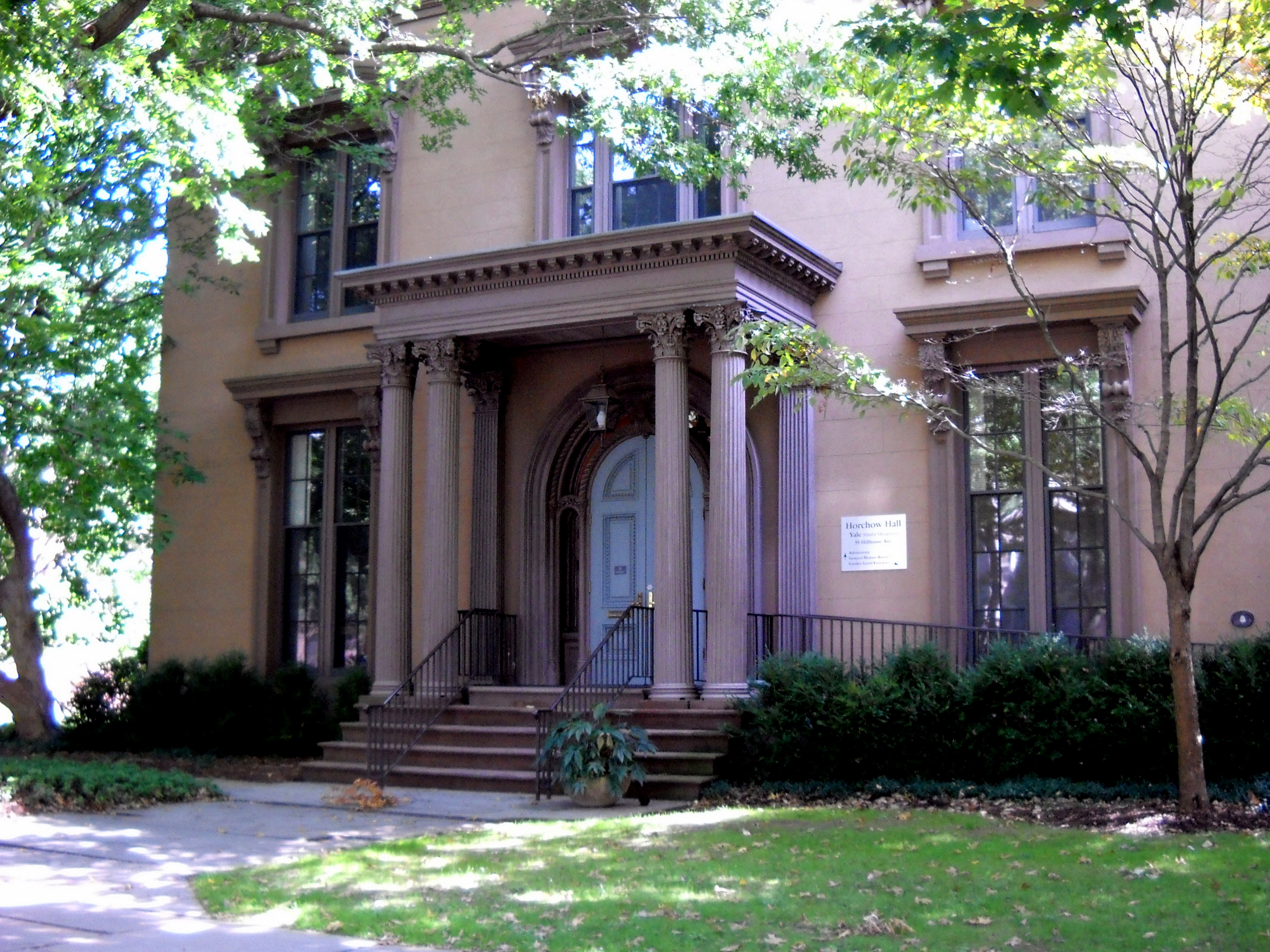
Pelatiah Perit House, now Horchow Hall, Yale School of Management, New Haven, CT (1860)

Stone's earliest New Haven residential commissions included the Mayor John B. Robertson House (c. 1833) and the Gerald Hallock House (1836). Hallock, a staunch abolitionist, was the editor of the Journal of Commerce. His palatial summer residence was sited in the area that would become known as City Point and designed by Stone to emulate Kenilworth Castle in Warwickshire, England. The National Register of Historic Places Nomination form for the Hillhouse Avenue Historic District names Stone as builder of the John North House (1836) on Whitney Avenue in New Haven with no architect listed. According to specification documents handwritten by Stone now archived at the New Haven Colony Historical Society Library, Leonard Pardee was contracted as the builder while Stone acted as North's 'agent'. Until its 1909 renovation, the home boasted a Tuscan style front corner tower.

Before 1840 Stone had designed residences for a number of New Haven's most prominent citizens. Among them were the Solomon Collis House at 75 Wooster Street, the Roger Sherman Baldwin House at 115 Church Street, and the Rev. Harry G. Croswell House at 114 Crown Street.

In 1848 Stone built the Thomas Trowbridge House at 45 Elm Street. The same year he designed a home for his own family at the corner of Olive and Lyon Streets, in the area of New Haven that became known as Stoneville. The Stone family resided there until 1855 when he moved his family to a home on Elm Street.

Among Stone's most well-known residential designs still extant are the Ezekiel Trowbridge House (1852) (now Center Church Parish House) on Temple Street and the Pelatiah Perit House (1860) on Hillhouse Avenue. Later renamed Horchow Hall, the Perit House is currently owned by Yale University. It is designated as a lecture hall and offices for the Greenberg Fellows Program and the Jackson Institute for Global Affairs.

Also of note, the modes Stone used for heating, ventilation and distribution of water in the Shaw House (1862) at 119 Greene Street were lauded at the time as “admirable and worthy of observation by persons intending to build".

== Civic involvement ==
Throughout his life Stone participated in many civic activities and organizations. In 1830 he was chosen Captain of the New Haven Grays, a defense force for New Haven formed from the New Haven Militia in 1816, of which he had been a member since 1822. He was elected delegate to the Young Men's National Republican Convention in 1832, served as delegate from the 4th State Senatorial District in 1834, and as town councilman from 1834 to 1838. In 1843 he was named a member of the Presidential Committee of the General Hospital Society of Connecticut, and, in 1845, he was appointed a Justice of the Peace in New Haven.

His civic engagement continued through the 1870s. He was a delegate to the State Republican Convention in 1859. At the outbreak of the Civil War he was offered a regimental command but—at 57—turned it down because of his age. He was the first major of the 'Veteran Grays' which was formed from the New Haven Grays in 1861 and served in that position for three years. In 1863 he participated with the New Haven Grays at the inauguration of Connecticut Governor William Buckingham. In that same year he was appointed to the Committee of Arrangements for the funeral of Rear Admiral Andrew Hull Foote by the New Haven Common Council and, along with Henry Austin, to the New Haven Mayor's Harbor Committee. In 1870 the CT House of Representatives requested that Stone and Austin prepare a cost estimate for a proposed extension of the Insane Hospital and State Prison. In 1880 Stone, at the age of 77, continued to serve on the Board of Trustees and the Finance Committee of the New Haven Orphan Asylum.

== Entrepreneurship ==
The drive and ambition that brought Stone to New Haven and motivated him to work his way up from journeyman to architect seems to have also fueled his business acumen. W.G. Snow, in his research notes, points to the fact that as a young man in 1826 Stone participated in a shooting competition in an area of Fair Haven known as Barnesville. Fifty years later, in 1876, he owned the Barnesville Hotel and its contiguous property.

As early as the 1830s Stone began acquiring parcels of undeveloped land in the New Haven area. His ‘fortunate’ purchase of pastureland in the New Township area just north of Wooster Square led to the opening of Lyon Street. There he built several houses and developed the Stoneville neighborhood. In 1834, only two years after he had begun to advertise his architectural services, he placed an ad in The Connecticut Herald offering a house for sale on Broadway in New Haven. The following year records show that he purchased property on George Street from J. Eli Mix for $6,000.

In 1836 he advertised a house for sale on Union Street and a farm “containing 90 acres”. In the same year he purchased 50 acres in Fair Haven for $1,322.64. (The supposition can be made that this property would have been owned in partnership with another buyer or the original seller since the amount is 2/3rds of $2,000.) In 1839 Stone's advertisements began to list commercial rentals, in both New Haven and Milford, including in the Phoenix Block at 812 Chapel Street where he had, by that time, established his own office.

Stone's property purchases seem to have abated during the Panic of 1837 through the loss of his first wife in 1841. Between 1841 and 1854 Milford land records show that Stone purchased 15 separate land parcels in that town while in New Haven his purchases begin again in 1842. In December 1843 he purchased property from Horace Thompson at the corner of New Haven's Olive and Lyon Streets where he built the home in which his own growing family would live between 1849 and 1854.

Other land purchases are described in The New Haven Preservation Trust's New Haven Resources Inventory published in 1981: “Two of the other most active and prominent real estate speculators in the upper State Street area between 1850 and 1870 were William Atwater and Sidney Mason Stone…. Land records indicate that Stone purchased most of the land on the eastern side of the street north of Humphrey Street from Nathaniel and Simeon Jocelyn in the 1840s and/or early 1850s. Stone…apparently began to build a few houses in this area on the speculative basis during the 1860s; however, the bulk of his holdings would not be developed until the last quarter of the 19th century.”

But of particular interest among Stone's real estate dealings is a property in Milford where verd antique marble had been discovered in 1811 by Benjamin Silliman. In 1835 Stone and Nathan Whiting purchased a parcel of land “formerly owned by the Milford Marble Company”. In 1836 they sold a 2/3rds ownership of that land along with additional Milford property that contained the Marble Manufactory buildings to Theodore Shelton of New York City for the price of $10,000. By 1838 Milford Marble Company re-opened for business, but the difficulty that the mining process presented forced it to close again within a few years. Even so, enough of the prized Milford verde-antique marble was acquired to supply the mineral for decorative use throughout the country, including in the U.S. Capitol Building, the White House and the Smithsonian Institution. Whether Stone continued to maintain a 1/3 ownership of the land and mineral rights is not, at this point, documented, but in 1870 the Connecticut Legislature approved a resolution for incorporation of the Verd-Antique Marble Company with Stone, Isaac Thompson, Seymour Bradley, and W.W. Stone (Sidney Stone's only surviving son) as corporators. In 1877 Stone received an award for the marble and “its adaptation to interior decoration” from the U.S. Centennial Commission at the International Exhibition in Philadelphia.

== Publications ==
Stone's building plans have been published in several books including A Book of Plans for Churches and Parsonages (1853) issued by the Congregational Churches of the United States General Convention held in Albany in 1852, Rural Church and Cottage Architecture: comprising a series of designs for churches, parsonages, and cottages exemplified in plans, elevations, sections, and details, with practical descriptions by Richard Upjohn, et al., published by Northwestern Publishing House, Chicago, IL (n.d.) and most recently in Refinement of America: Persons, Houses, Cities, 2nd Ed. by R. L. Bushman (2011).

Although six of his original drawings were anonymously donated to the collection of the Beinecke Rare Book and Manuscript Library at Yale University in 2000, and his front elevation of the Roger Sherman Baldwin House, New Haven is in the collection of the Carnegie Art Museum in Pittsburg, after his death, according to Seymour, "An immense pile of his drawings was sold for old paper" and "his working library was sold as being of no particular value" while a number of rare volumes—some possibly purchased at the 1844 sale of Ithiel Town's library—remained in the family. At least 3 items from this collection were eventually purchased by philanthropist Paul Mellon and donated to New York's Pierpont Morgan Library in 1979.

== Influence ==
Stone's reputation became such that by the 1830s Yale College which at the time had not yet established its School of Architecture, referred students interested in that profession to him for tutelage. According to his granddaughter, Margaret M. Lothrop, he "was well known, partly because he designed many churches and institutional buildings, and partly because he had collected around him a group of brilliant and devoted students."

Those students included E. Townsend Mix who would gain prominence as an architect in the Midwest; Waterbury, CT architect Robert Wakeman Hill (1828-1909) who served as Connecticut State Architect under four governors and Samuel Atwater Treat, a New Haven native who went on to later prominence as an architect in the Chicago area. The short-lived architectural firm formed by Landra Beach Platt & Francis Benne that is currently credited with designing the Richard Alsop IV House (1838–39) in Middletown, Connecticut “came together under the professional aegis" of Stone. Stone, Platt and Benne were cited together by the Washington National Monument Society for plans they submitted to the 1836 monument design competition. Chicago and California architect, Henry Lord Gay (1844-1921) was said to have worked in Stone's office "since grammar school" before moving on to practice in Chicago. In recent years, curiosity has been raised about Stone's relationship to his contemporary, Henry Austin, but little documentation has thus far been discovered that lends itself to such an inquiry.

In addition to his direct influence on future generations of architects, Stone's presence in the life of his daughter Harriett is likely to have been a contributing factor to her interest in historical preservation during her adult life. Harriett and her husband, Daniel Lothrop, purchased The Wayside, former home of Nathaniel Hawthorne in Concord, Massachusetts, in 1883 (the year after Stone's death). Harriett devoted much of her time to its restoration and preservation—along with that of its neighbor, Alcott's Orchard House—until her death in 1924 at which time the cause was taken up by her daughter, Margaret, who succeeded in securing National Landmark status for the home.
