= Five Little Peppers and How They Grew =

- Directed by: Charles Barton
- Screenplay by: Nathalie Bucknall; Jefferson Parker
- Story by: J. Robert Bren; Gladys Atwater
- Based on: Five Little Peppers and How They Grew by Margaret Sidney
- Produced by: Jack Fier (producer); Irving Briskin (executive producer)
- Starring: Edith Fellows; Charles Peck; Tommy Bond; Jimmy Leake; Dorothy Anne Seese
- Cinematography: Henry Freulich
- Edited by: James Sweeney
- Distributed by: Columbia Pictures
- Release date: August 22, 1939
- Running time: 58 minutes
- Country: United States
- Language: English

Five Little Peppers and How They Grew is a 1939 American black-and-white children's comedy drama film directed by Charles Barton, produced by Jack Fier and based on the novel of the same name by Margaret Sidney. Starring Edith Fellows, Charles Peck, Tommy Bond, Jimmy Leake and Dorothy Ann Seese, it is the first of four Five Little Peppers films.

== Plot ==
Mrs. Pepper and her five children Polly, Ben, Joey, Davie and Phronsie are a poor but happy family. Mrs. Pepper's husband John, a mine engineer, died when the copper mine that he half-owned caved in. Teenage Polly inherited her father's share of the mine, which her father wished for her to keep at least until she comes of age, although he never found copper in the mine. Polly looks after the other Pepper children while Mrs. Pepper is at work. By chance, Polly and Joey meet rich but lonely teenager Jasper King, who befriends the Pepper children. Jasper lives with his wealthy grandfather J.H. King, who ignores Jasper as he is obsessed with making money to the exclusion of all else. King has no interest in Jasper befriending the Peppers until he learns about who they are. King has bought the other half of the mine and wants Polly's half as cheaply as possible to start more exploration. Hiding his true intentions, King starts spending time with the Peppers, plying them with gifts. With an outbreak of measles, Jasper and King spend more time with the Peppers than they had expected and the Pepper children grow to love them.

== Cast ==
- Edith Fellows as Polly
- Charles Peck as Ben
- Tommy Bond as Joey
- Jimmy Leake as Davie
- Dorothy Ann Seese as Phronsie
- Dorothy Peterson as Mrs. Pepper
- Ronald Sinclair as Jasper
- Clarence Kolb as Mr. King
- Leonard Carey as Martin
- Bruce Bennett as chauffeur (uncredited)

== Reception ==
On September 6, 1939, Variety wrote, "Excellent comedy-drama for the family and juvenile trade. New family series gets fine launching."

== See also ==
- Five Little Peppers at Home
- Out West with the Peppers
- Five Little Peppers in Trouble
