= Five Little Peppers in Trouble =

- Directed by: Charles Barton
- Screenplay by: Harry Sauber
- Based on: Five Little Peppers in Trouble by Margaret Sidney
- Produced by: Jack Fier; Irving Briskin (executive producer)
- Starring: Edith Fellows; Charles Peck; Tommy Bond; Bobby Larson; Pierre Watkin; Ronald Sinclair
- Cinematography: Benjamin H. Kline
- Edited by: Richard Fantl
- Music by: Sidney Cutner
- Production company: Columbia Pictures
- Distributed by: Columbia Pictures
- Release date: September 1, 1940
- Running time: 64 minutes
- Country: United States
- Language: English

Five Little Peppers in Trouble is a 1940 American black and white comedy-drama film, directed by Charles Barton and produced by Jack Fier. It was the fourth and final film in the Five Little Peppers series.

== Plot ==
Jasper's aunt plans to take Jasper to live with her, thinking that he's not being properly taken care of by his grandfather, Mr. King. King enrolls Jasper and the five Peppers in a private school, where they are teased by the other children.

== Cast ==
- Edith Fellows as Polly Pepper
- Charles Peck as Ben Pepper
- Tommy Bond as Joey Pepper
- Bobby Larson as Davie Pepper
- Dorothy Ann Seese as Phronsie Pepper
- Pierre Watkin as Mr. King
- Ronald Sinclair as Jasper
- Dorothy Peterson as Mrs. Pepper
- Rex Evans as Martin
- Kathleen Howard as Mrs. Wilcox
- Mary Currier as Mrs. Lansdowne
- Helen Brown as Miss Roland
- Betty Jane Graham as May
- Shirley Mills as June
- Shirley Jean Rickert as Kiki
- Antonia Oland as Pam
- Rita Quigley as Peggy
- Ann Barlow as Cynthia
- Don Beddoe and George McKay as Process Servers
- Sue Ann Burnett as Madeline
- Robert Carson as Jim
- Bess Flowers as Miss Roberts
- Carlton Griffin as Mr. Barnes
- Eddie Laughton as Miss Wilcox's chauffeur
- Billy Lechner as Tom
- Judy Lynn as Betty
- Freddie Mercer as Tim
- Beverly Michaelson as Dorothy
- Ruth Robinson as Miss Simpson
- Reginald Simpson as Mr. Gorman

== Reception ==
In Columbia Pictures Movie Series, 1926–1955: The Harry Cohn Years, Gene Blottner writes that the Five Little Peppers series ended "because, quite frankly, the screenplays were so saccharin that even the talented Edith Fellows couldn't save them."

== See also ==
- Five Little Peppers and How They Grew
- Five Little Peppers at Home
- Out West with the Peppers
