= Nathalie Bucknall =

American screenwriter

- Born: July 21, 1895; Saint Petersburg, Russia
- Died: March 20, 1959 (aged 63); Los Angeles, California, USA
- Occupation(s): Screenwriter, researcher
- Spouse: George Bucknall

Nathalie Maria Bucknall (1895 – 1959), OBE, was a Russia-born screenwriter and MGM film researcher dubbed "The Woman Who Knows It All" during her time in Hollywood.

== Biography ==
=== Origins ===
Nathalie was born in Saint Petersburg, Russia, in 1895 to wealthy, powerful parents: Her father, Ivan de Fedenko, was counselor of state. She attended the Civil Engineering College for Women and the College of St. Anne.

=== World War I ===
Nathalie became a nurse in the Kauffman Sisterhood when World War I broke out, and was heavily decorated by the czar for her wartime contributions. In 1917, she joined the Battalion of Death, one of the only groups of women on the front lines of the war.

That same year, while on a mission to find out about the secret operations of the Bolsheviks, she met Lt. Cmdr. George Bucknall of the British navy. The couple married, and she became a British subject; they continued to work as intelligence agents. In Moscow, the pair narrowly escaped the firing squad for refusing to divulge the location of British documents.

=== Arrival in the U.S. ===
In 1918, they left Russia, and Nathalie was awarded with the Order of the British Empire. Nathalie had always wanted to come to America, and in 1922, she and her husband arrived in the United States. After traveling the country, they settled down in Los Angeles, and in 1927, Nathalie joined MGM's script department.

=== MGM career ===
Her time in the script department did not last long as soon, she had founded MGM's research department, which she would end up heading for years. Her extensive knowledge was so depended upon by the studio that she was dubbed "The Woman Who Knew It All" by members of the press. She traveled widely and took many photos to ensure accuracy. She also collected all manner of documents, theater programs, and curios. Her work also involved making sure studios were legally protected and avoided libel cases.

Her knowledge of Russia came in handy for a number of MGM productions filmed in the 1930s, including Rasputin and Anna Karenina. She also happened to speak Russian, German, French, and English fluently, and was proficient in Swedish, Italian, Spanish, and Norwegian, a major asset in her role at the studio. Additionally, she was reportedly the first woman to obtain a certificate as a sound engineer. In 1939, she wrote two screenplays: Four Girls in White and Five Little Peppers and How They Grow.

=== Later life ===
After retiring from MGM in the 1940s, she worked as health coordinator for Los Angeles County through most of the 1950s. She died in Los Angeles in 1959.

== Selected filmography ==
- Five Little Peppers and How They Grow (1939)
- Four Girls in White (1939)
