= It Could Happen to You (1939 film) =

1939 American comedy film directed by Alfred L. Werker

- Theatrical release poster
- Directed by: Alfred L. Werker
- Screenplay by: Lou Breslow; Allen Rivkin
- Story by: Charles Hoffman
- Produced by: David Hempstead
- Starring: Stuart Erwin; Gloria Stuart; Raymond Walburn; Douglas Fowley; June Gale; Clarence Kolb
- Cinematography: Ernest Palmer
- Production company: 20th Century Fox
- Distributed by: 20th Century Fox
- Release date: June 8, 1939
- Running time: 70 minutes
- Country: United States
- Language: English

It Could Happen to You is a 1939 American comedy film directed by Alfred L. Werker and written by Lou Breslow and Allen Rivkin. The film stars Stuart Erwin, Gloria Stuart, Raymond Walburn, Douglas Fowley, June Gale and Clarence Kolb. The film was released on June 8, 1939, by 20th Century Fox.

== Plot ==
A beautiful girl gets murdered and ad man Mackinley Winslow gets arrested, now his wife Doris has to solve the crime and prove her husband's innocence.

== Cast ==
- Stuart Erwin as Mackinley Winslow
- Gloria Stuart as Doris Winslow
- Raymond Walburn as J. Hadden Quigley
- Douglas Fowley as Freddie Barlow
- June Gale as Agnes Barlow
- Clarence Kolb as Alfred Wiman
- Paul Hurst as Sandy
- Richard Lane as District Attorney Gibson
- Robert Greig as Pedley
