= Four Girls in White =

- 1939 theatrical poster
- Directed by: S. Sylvan Simon
- Written by: Endre Bohem; Nathalie Bucknall
- Produced by: Nat Levine
- Starring: Florence Rice; Una Merkel; Buddy Ebsen
- Cinematography: Leonard Smith
- Edited by: George Boemler
- Color process: Black and white
- Production company: Metro-Goldwyn-Mayer
- Distributed by: Loew's Inc.
- Release date: January 27, 1939
- Running time: 73 minutes
- Country: United States
- Language: English

Four Girls in White is a 1939 drama film directed by S. Sylvan Simon, starring Florence Rice and Una Merkel. It follows the mostly comical exploits of four nursing students enrolled in a three-year training course.

== Plot ==
Student nurses at a large urban hospital cope with life's problems and career issues.

== Cast ==
- Florence Rice as Norma Page
- Una Merkel as Robbins
- Ann Rutherford as Pat Page
- Mary Howard as Mary Forbes
- Alan Marshal as Dr. Steve Melford
- Kent Taylor as Bob Maitland
- Buddy Ebsen as Express, an orderly
- Jessie Ralph as Miss Tobias
- Sara Haden as Miss Bennett
- Phillip Terry as Dr. Sidney
- Tom Neal as Dr. Phillips

== Production ==
The working titles for this film were Women in White and Diary of a Nurse, and it was filmed between December 5, 1938 and January 3, 1939.

== Parody ==
On April 4, 1939 Jack Benny and his ensemble performed a parody of "Four Girls in White" on "The JELL-O Program".
