= Charles Barnard (writer) =

American writer (1838–1920)

- Born: January 1, 1838; Boston, Massachusetts, U.S.
- Died: January 1, 1920 (aged 82); New York City, U.S.
- Occupations: Writer, journalist
- Years active: 19th–20th century
- Employer(s): The Century Magazine; Harper’s Magazine
- Known for: Popular science and children’s literature; magazine writing

Charles Barnard (1838–1920) was an American reporter, playwright and writer.

He was born in Boston, Massachusetts, February 13, 1838. He was the son of C. F. Barnard, a clergyman. He was unable to complete his studies to ministry due to bad health, and would work in a florist business. He regularly contributed to a number popular fiction magazines, including The Century Magazine, Smith's Magazine, Scribner's Monthly, Harper's New Monthly Magazine, Harper's Young People, Wide Awake and St. Nicholas.

His works include The Soprano (1969), The Tone-Masters (1871), a biography of Camilla Urso by the name of Camilla (1871), Knights of To-Day (1881), The Whistling Buoy (1887) and The County Fair (1888), the latter among which was written with Neil Burgess and later adapted into a film of the same name (1920). His work has been noted as an often comedic avenue into a particularly broad collection of inventions and activities of the late nineteenth and early twentieth centuries, charting perceptions of tools and technologies from electricity and telegraphy to common practices of vegetable gardening, the florist business, and fruit growing.
