= Dangerous Holiday =

1937 drama film

- Directed by: Nicholas T. Barrows
- Screenplay by: Nicholas T. Barrows
- Story by: Karen DeWolf; Barry Shipman
- Produced by: William Berke
- Starring: Ronald Sinclair; Guinn "Big Boy" Williams; Hedda Hopper; Jack La Rue; Jed Prouty; Lynne Roberts
- Cinematography: William Nobles
- Edited by: Roy V. Livingston
- Music by: Alberto Colombo
- Production company: Republic Pictures
- Distributed by: Republic Pictures
- Release date: June 7, 1937
- Running time: 58 minutes
- Country: United States
- Language: English

Dangerous Holiday is a 1937 American drama film written and directed by Nicholas T. Barrows. The film stars Ronald Sinclair, Guinn "Big Boy" Williams, Hedda Hopper, Jack La Rue, Jed Prouty and Lynne Roberts. The film was released on June 7, 1937, by Republic Pictures.

== Plot ==
Violin prodigy Ronnie Kimball is tired of being exploited by his manager and family, so he decides to disappear for some time.

== Cast ==
- Ronald Sinclair as Ronnie Kimball
- Guinn "Big Boy" Williams as Duke Edwards
- Hedda Hopper as Lottie Courtney
- Jack La Rue as Gollenger
- Jed Prouty as Gifford
- Lynne Roberts as Jean Robbins
- William Bakewell as Tom Wilson
- Fern Emmett as Aunt Elsie
- Virginia Sale as Aunt Augusta
- Franklin Pangborn as Doffle
- Grady Sutton as Max
- William Newell as Solitaire
- Thomas E. Jackson as Marty
- Olaf Hytten as Popcorn
- Jack Mulhall as Police Sergeant
- Michael Jeffrey as Jerry Courtney
- Harvey Clark as Benjamin Robbins
- Wade Boteler as Police Captain Blake
- Carleton Young as Tango

== Critical reception ==
Joseph F. Coughlin, writing for Motion Picture Herald, commented that the film served mainly as a vehicle for the young actor, Ronald Sinclair, and although Sinclair was "strikingly handsome", and possessed a "surprising resemblance" to Freddie Bartholomew, "a rather apparent camera consciousness detracts from his eager and engaging personality." Coughlin expressed the view that the film may be difficult for exhibitors to promote as "star names are absent" and "performances are competent if not inspired."
