= Five Little Peppers at Home =

5 Little Peppers at Home
- Directed by: Charles Barton
- Based on: Five Little Peppers at Home by Margaret Sidney
- Produced by: Jack Fier
- Starring: Edith Fellows; Charles Peck; Tommy Bond; Bobby Larson; Dorothy Anne Seese; Clarence Kolb; Ronald Sinclair
- Cinematography: Allen G. Siegler
- Edited by: Viola Lawrence
- Music by: Morris Stoloff (musical director)
- Production company: Columbia Pictures
- Distributed by: Columbia Pictures
- Release date: February 8, 1940
- Running time: 67 minutes
- Country: United States
- Language: English

Five Little Peppers at Home is a 1940 American drama black and white film, directed by Charles Barton. It is the second film in the Five Little Peppers series.

== Plot ==
The copper mine co-owned by Polly and Mr. King has not yielded any copper, and the stress has left King bedridden. Polly learns that King's valet Martin is knowledgeable in geology, and Polly and her siblings bring Martin to the mine to look for a copper vein. Ben accidentally causes a cave-in, trapping his sisters and brothers.

== Cast ==
- Edith Fellows as Polly Pepper
- Charles Peck as Ben Pepper
- Tommy Bond as Joey Pepper
- Bobby Larson as Davie Pepper
- Dorothy Ann Seese as Phronsie Pepper
- Clarence Kolb as Mr. King
- Ronald Sinclair as Jasper
- Rex Evans as Martin
- Herbert Rawlinson as Mr. Decker
- Laura Treadwell as Aunt Martha

== Reception ==
On March 6, 1940, Variety wrote, "More fatal about the second Pepper story is its tediousness and with one or two exceptions, the dullness of the characters. Weak."

== See also ==
- Five Little Peppers and How They Grew
- Out West with the Peppers
- Five Little Peppers in Trouble
