= Charles Barton (director) =

American director, actor (1902–1981)

- Born: Charles Thomas Barton; May 25, 1902; San Francisco, California, United States
- Died: December 5, 1981 (aged 79); Burbank, California, United States
- Occupations: Actor; vaudevillian; film director
- Years active: 1920–1971
- Spouses: Nancy Barton (died 1951); Lee Barton (div. 1958): Julie Gibson (m. 1973-1981)
- Family: Henry Barton (descendant)

Charles Barton (May 25, 1902 – December 5, 1981) was an American film and vaudeville actor and film director. He won an Oscar for best assistant director in 1933. His first film as a director was the Zane Grey feature Wagon Wheels, starring Randolph Scott, in 1934.

Barton worked in Hollywood B-movie units. From 1946, he was a principal director of the Abbott and Costello comedies, such as The Time of Their Lives, Buck Privates Come Home, Abbott and Costello Meet Frankenstein, and Africa Screams. He later directed Walt Disney films such as The Shaggy Dog and Toby Tyler or 10 Weeks with a Circus. His extensive work for television included every episode of Amos 'n' Andy in the 1950s, a total of 90 episodes of Dennis the Menace in the 1960s, and 106 episodes of Family Affair from 1967 to 1971. One obituary said he directed 580 television episodes, 70 feature films and dozens of commercials.

== Early life and career ==
Through an entirely paternal line Barton was a direct descendant of the Sheriff of London, Henry Barton. Charles Barton began acting at the age of thirteen. He worked on stage and was signed to United Artists where he starred in The County Fair (1921). He grew to the height of 5 ft 2 in (1.57 m), and his height limited the amount of work he could get, so in the mid-1920s Barton decided to move into directing. In 1927, Barton worked as an assistant director on Wings (1927), directed by William Wellman, he also played a small role.

Barton was an assistant director for some years before directing Wagon Wheels for Paramount Pictures in 1934. In 1935, Paramount awarded him a long-term contract helming four pictures a year thereafter for the studio until 1937. During his time at Paramount, Barton returned to acting briefly for Wellman's Beau Geste (1939).

In May 1939, he joined Columbia Pictures who assigned him to direct Behind Prison Gates, starring Brian Donlevy. He directed a total of 34 features for Columbia through the first half of 1944, including comedian Joe Besser's first starring feature film with Ann Miller for Columbia, Hey Rookie (1944). Joe Besser called him "one of the great comedy directors".

In August 1944, Barton was signed by Universal Pictures to a term deal as producer-director directing 14 features over the next eleven years, including the first of six feature-length Abbott and Costello comedies starting in 1946 with The Time of Their Lives.

In 1948, Barton directed Abbott and Costello in the first of two independently-produced features, The Noose Hangs High, for Eagle-Lion, and then, in 1949, Africa Screams for Nassour Studios, marking the only film appearance of Joe Besser and Shemp Howard together in supporting roles, each of whom were at one time members of The Three Stooges comedy team.

Overall, Barton directed nine Abbott and Costello films, including their last movie as a team, Dance with Me, Henry, in 1956.

== Personal ==
Barton's wife of seven years, Nancy, died at their home in 1951 after a two year illness.

In 1958, during divorce proceedings with his new wife Lee, Barton claimed he earned a net figure of US$2,000 (equivalent to $22,300 in 2025) a month.

Barton was married to actress/singer Julie Gibson from 1973 until his death from a heart attack in 1981. He died at the Providence Saint Joseph Medical Center.

== Selected filmography ==
=== Director ===
- Wagon Wheels (1934)
- Car 99 (1935)
- Rocky Mountain Mystery (1935)
- The Last Outpost (1935)
- Nevada (1935)
- Timothy's Quest (1936)
- And Sudden Death (1936)
- Murder with Pictures (1936)
- Rose Bowl (1936)
- The Crime Nobody Saw (1937)
- Forlorn River (1937)
- Thunder Trail (1937)
- Born to the West (1937)
- Behind Prison Gates (1939)
- Five Little Peppers and How They Grew (1939)
- My Son Is Guilty (1939)
- Five Little Peppers at Home (1940)
- Island of Doomed Men (1940)
- Babies for Sale (1940)
- Out West with the Peppers (1940)
- Five Little Peppers in Trouble (1940)
- Nobody's Children (1940)
- The Phantom Submarine (1940)
- The Big Boss (1941)
- The Richest Man in Town (1941)
- Harmon of Michigan (1941)
- Two Latins from Manhattan (1941)
- Sing for Your Supper (1941)
- Honolulu Lu (1941)
- Shut My Big Mouth (1942)
- Tramp, Tramp, Tramp (1942)
- Hello, Annapolis (1942)
- Sweetheart of the Fleet (1942)
- Parachute Nurse (1942)
- A Man's World (1942)
- Lucky Legs (1942)
- The Spirit of Stanford (1942)
- Laugh Your Blues Away (1942)
- Reveille with Beverly (1943)
- Let's Have Fun (1943)
- She Has What It Takes (1943)
- What's Buzzin', Cousin? (1943)
- Is Everybody Happy? (1943)
- Beautiful but Broke (1944)
- Hey, Rookie (1944)
- Jam Session (1944)
- Louisiana Hayride (1944)
- The Beautiful Cheat (1945)
- Men in Her Diary (1945)
- Smooth as Silk (1946)
- The Time of Their Lives (1946)
- White Tie and Tails (1946)
- Buck Privates Come Home (1947)
- The Wistful Widow of Wagon Gap (1947)
- The Noose Hangs High (1948)
- Abbott and Costello Meet Frankenstein (1948)
- Mexican Hayride (1948)
- Africa Screams (1949)
- Abbott and Costello Meet the Killer, Boris Karloff (1949)
- Free for All (1949)
- The Milkman (1950)
- Double Crossbones (1951)
- Ma and Pa Kettle at the Fair (1952)
- Dance with Me, Henry (1956)
- The Shaggy Dog (1959)
- Toby Tyler or 10 Weeks with a Circus (1960)
- Swingin' Along (1961)

=== Actor ===
- The County Fair (1920) - Tim Vail
- Wings (1927) - Soldier Flirting with Mary (uncredited)
- Beau Geste (1939) - Buddy McMonigal (final film role)
