= Five Little Peppers =

1881–1916 children's book series by Margaret Sidney

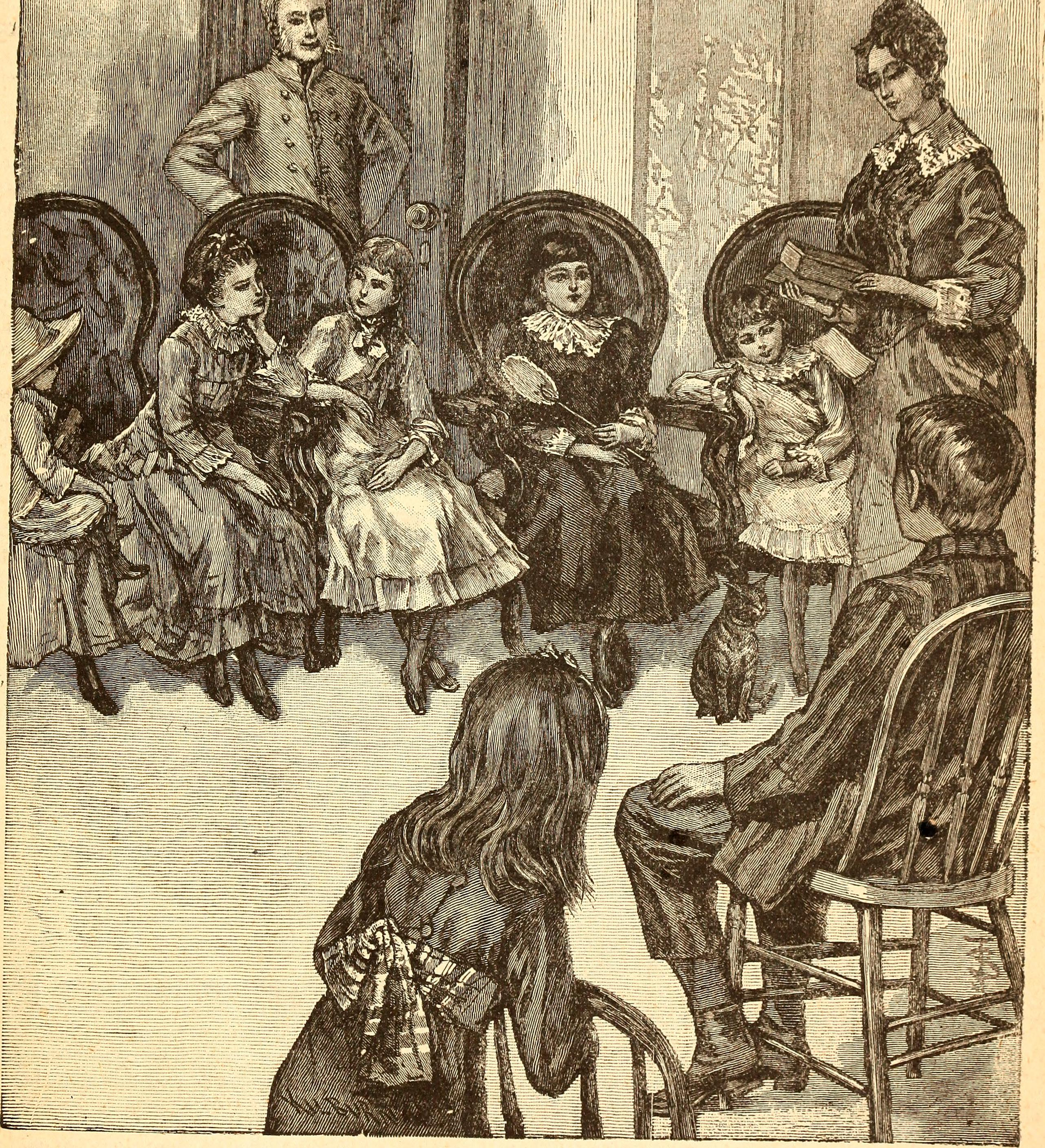
An illustration for The Five Little Peppers, 1887

The Five Little Peppers is a book series created by American author Margaret Sidney, which was published from 1881 through 1916. It covers the lives of the five children in their native state and develops with their rescue by a wealthy gentleman who takes an interest in the family.

== Series overview ==
The Five Little Peppers and How They Grew tells how the Peppers live, learn, and play in their little brown house. They are poor, and Mamsie must work constantly to keep the wolf from the door, but their lives are unexpectedly happy.

When the youngest, Phronsie, is kidnapped by an organ grinder, she is rescued by young Jasper King and his dog Prince, both of whom soon become fast friends with the Peppers. The family so charms Jasper and his father that one by one they are invited to visit the Kings' home in the city and soon the entire family is living there. Mr. King makes Mrs. Pepper his housekeeper and does everything in his power to entertain and educate the children.

The stories continue with the Peppers' adventures in school, abroad, and even back in the little brown house where their thoughts and hearts will always turn. The series spans 17 years, beginning with Phronsie as a three-year-old and finishing with her as a 20-year-old young lady.

== Characters ==
Mrs. Pepper (Later Mrs. Fisher): Called "Mamsie" by her children, Mrs. Pepper is a widow struggling to keep her five children healthy and educated. She is the family's moral backbone and her children are completely devoted to her. She eventually weds Dr. Adoniram Fisher with her brood's full approval.

Ben (Ebenezer): The eldest of the five. Ben is an avid scholar but willingly puts aside schooling in favor of providing for the family. He manages the younger children with his sister and will sacrifice anything for them. He is eleven at the start of The Five Little Peppers and How They Grew.

Polly (Mary): The elder Pepper girl, aged 10 at the start of The Five Little Peppers and How They Grew. Polly is a busy, bright, cheerful girl who makes the family's life as happy as possible. She loves music, flowers, and her baby sister with equal passion.

Joel: The middle Pepper, the middle boy, the most active. He is 8 in The Five Little Peppers and How They Grew. Joel is an enthusiastic sportsman who loves treats, parties, and entertainment. He is the most troublesome, often getting himself into mischief or causing others grief with the things he says. He settles down somewhat in college and becomes active in a student church group.

Davie (David): The youngest boy and the quietest sibling. Davie allows the world to go on around him as he calmly absorbs the family's doings. An obedient student, he's equally willing to give up anything to make Joel or Ben happy. Somewhat of a dandy in late adolescence, he is teasingly nicknamed "Davina" by other students.

Phronsie (Sophronia): The baby and pet of the family. The series opens with Phronsie as a wide-eyed blonde three-year-old who sees the good in nearly everyone and is anxious to aid anyone in need. She calls her dolls, Baby and Seraphina, her children and treats them as such. She is especially devoted to Polly and Mr. King, whom she calls "poor sick man."

Mr. J. Horatio King, Senior: The Pepper family’s benefactor. He is an older widower and in uncertain health at the beginning of the series. Bringing the Peppers into his household revitalizes him. Though quick of temper and firm of opinion, "Grandpapa" is a family man who seeks to ease every pain and concern in the lives of his children and the Peppers.

Jasper (Jasper, Junior, called "Jappy"): Mr. King’s grandson. Jasper is an eager boy who is just as willing to go sledding with Ben as to bake pies with Polly. Jasper and his dog Prince befriend the Peppers when he rescues Phronsie from an organ grinder and his monkey, and his affection for them ultimately leads him to request their company permanently in the household by marrying Polly.

The Whitneys: Marian King Whitney, Mr. King’s adult daughter, and her boys Percy, Van, and Dick Whitney make up the rest of the King household. Mr. Whitney ultimately turns out to be Mrs. Pepper’s cousin, making the Peppers distant relatives of the family. Mrs. Whitney is a second mother to the Pepper children. The three boys, while infatuated with Polly, are frequently at odds with one another and Joel.

== Publications ==
In order of publication, the Five Little Peppers books are as follows (publication dates follow in parentheses):

- Five Little Peppers and How They Grew. 1881. Archived from the original on March 4, 2016.
- Five Little Peppers Midway (1890) Project Gutenberg
- Five Little Peppers Grown Up (1892) Project Gutenberg
- Five Little Peppers: Phronsie Pepper (1897) Project Gutenberg
- Five Little Peppers: The Stories Polly Pepper Told (1899) Project Gutenberg
- Five Little Peppers: The Adventures of Joel Pepper (1900) Project Gutenberg
- Five Little Peppers Abroad (1902) Project Gutenberg
- Five Little Peppers At School (1903) Project Gutenberg
- Five Little Peppers and Their Friends (1904) Project Gutenberg
- Five Little Peppers: Ben Pepper (1905) Project Gutenberg
- Five Little Peppers in the Little Brown House (1907) Project Gutenberg
- Five Little Peppers: Our Davie Pepper (1916) Project Gutenberg

Margaret Sidney felt she had completed the books with the publication of the fourth book: Phronsie Pepper, and stated as much in her introduction to the book. Letters from readers around the world prompted her to continue writing about the Peppers, which she did for another nineteen years. All of the later books take place much before the third book in the original series. In chronological order, rather than by publication date, the six key books would be read approximately in this sequence:

- Five Little Peppers and How They Grew
- Five Little Peppers Midway
- Five Little Peppers Abroad
- Five Little Peppers and Their Friends
- Five Little Peppers Grown Up
- Five Little Peppers: Phronsie Pepper

The other six books are "background" and are set about the time of the first three books listed above chronologically. Since they were written many years later, some situations in them are at variance with those same situations as described in the earlier written books.

== Adaptations ==
The Pepper books were the inspiration for a brief series of feature films produced by Columbia Pictures in 1939 and 1940. The four films were vehicles for Columbia's juvenile star Edith Fellows, who played Polly. The rest of the children were Charles Peck (perhaps best known as the rich kid in the film version of Dead End) as Ben, Tommy Bond of Our Gang as Joey, Bobby Larson as Davie, and Dorothy Ann Seese as Phronsie. Clarence Kolb played Mr. King in the first two films, succeeded by Pierre Watkin in the remaining two; King's grandson Jasper was played in all four films by Ronald Sinclair, the former Ra Hould of late-1930s features.

The first Five Little Peppers film was devoted mostly to Edith Fellows as the senior member of the Pepper brood, and was not an exact reflection of the book. The other three films were homespun family stories with elements of comedy and drama. Edith Fellows carried the series, although by the time it lapsed, five-year-old Dorothy Ann Seese had become an audience favorite and was billed at the head of the cast, second only to Fellows.

The Pepper screenplays had little to do with the original books, but the four films were popular with moviegoers. The films remained in circulation for many years, and Columbia reissued two of them in 1946 as part of an industry-wide "children's film library" for weekend matinées. The series was also reprinted on 16mm film for schools, libraries, and nontheatrical showings. In order of their original release, the films are:

- Five Little Peppers and How They Grew (1939), introducing the Pepper family at their humble home in Gusty Corners
- Five Little Peppers at Home (1940); the kids trapped in a mine
- Out West with the Peppers (1940); the kids visit a lumber camp
- Five Little Peppers in Trouble (1940); the kids at a snobbish school

== In popular culture ==
The Pepper books are referenced in the TV series Fargo—Season 2, Episode 1. Specifically, the character Lou Solverson is reading from Chapter 4 of Five Little Peppers and How They Grew. The chapter is entitled "Trouble for the Little Brown House." The chapter carries an epigram from the New Testament book of Matthew: "I was sick, and ye visited me."
