= Thoroughbreds Don't Cry =

1937 film by Alfred E. Green

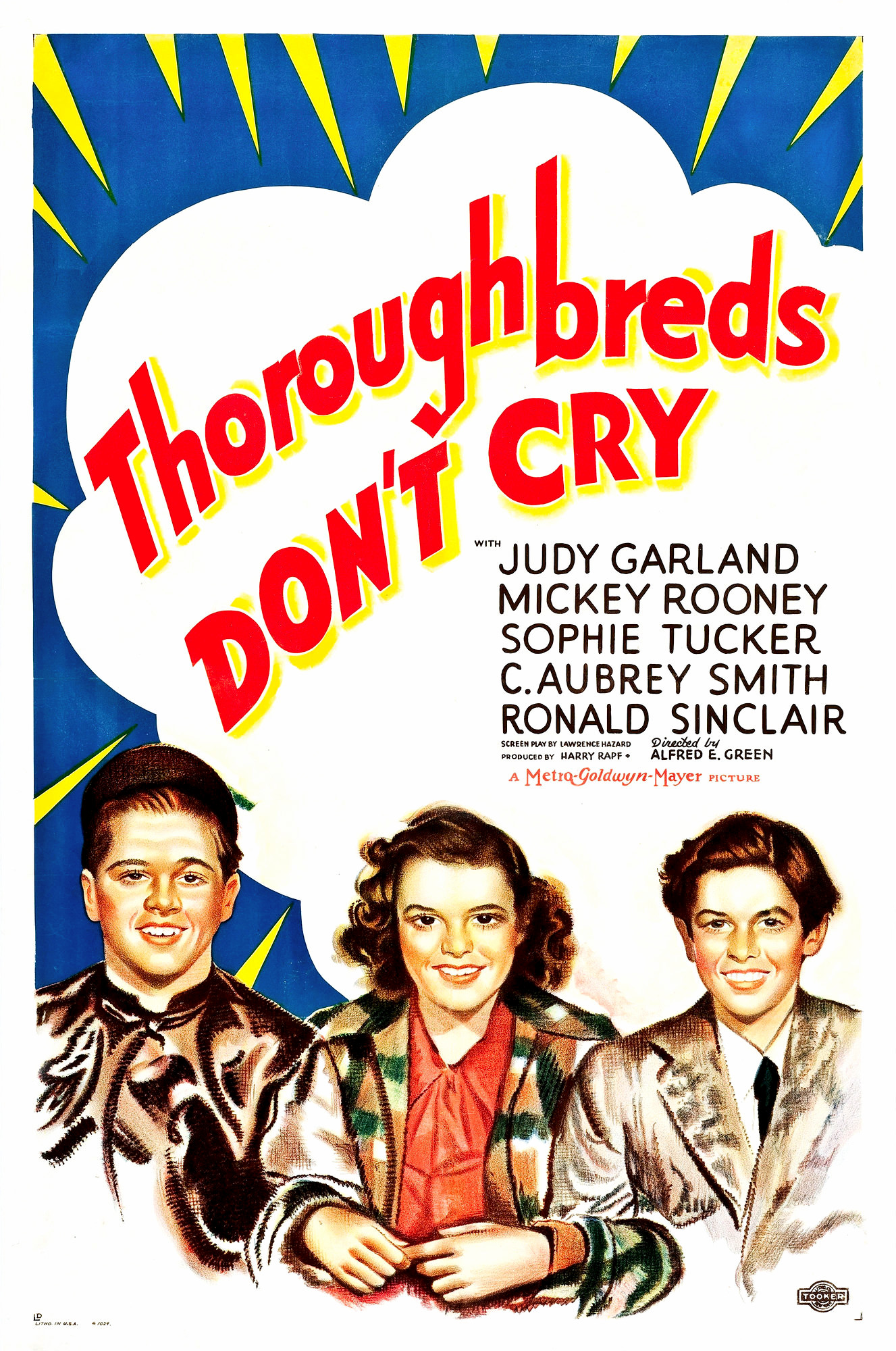
- Theatrical release poster
- Directed by: Alfred E. Green
- Written by: Eleanore Griffin (story); J. Walter Ruben (story); Lawrence Hazard; Dalton Trumbo (uncredited); Harold Gould (uncredited)
- Produced by: Harry Rapf
- Starring: Ronald Sinclair; Judy Garland; Mickey Rooney; C. Aubrey Smith; Sophie Tucker
- Cinematography: Leonard Smith
- Edited by: Elmo Veron
- Production company: Metro-Goldwyn-Mayer
- Distributed by: Loew's Inc.
- Release date: December 3, 1937
- Running time: 80 minutes
- Country: United States
- Language: English
- Budget: $503,000
- Box office: $731,000

Thoroughbreds Don't Cry is a 1937 American musical comedy film directed by Alfred E. Green and starring Mickey Rooney and Judy Garland in their first film together. This is also Garland's first starring role in a feature film, after having appeared in small supporting roles in two previous motion pictures.

== Plot ==
Cricket West is a hopeful actress with a pair of vocal cords that bring down the house. Her eccentric aunt runs a boarding house for the local jockeys, whose leader is the cocky but highly skilled Timmie Donovan, famous for his daring come-from-behind wins in the stretch. Into their lives comes Sir Peter Calverton and his young grandson Roger Calverton, who are titled but cash poor with only one asset, a prize-winning stakes horse called The Pookah.

Donovan's the best there is at his profession, but he is fatally compromised because his no-good gambler of a father, Charles D. Brown, pretending he is at death's door, extorts a pledge from Donovan to throw the prep race The Pookah is running in, in order to obtain cash for a "cure". Donovan does it but then is warned by the stewards that they're suspicious of his actions.

When The Pookah loses the race, the stress is too much for Sir Peter, and he dies of a heart attack. Roger doesn't have the money to enter The Pookah in The Cup, and plans to sell him. But Cricket tracks down Donovan, who has an attack of conscience and snatches the entrance fee from his conniving father. Roger wins the American Cup and Donovan's father is arrested.

== Cast ==
- Mickey Rooney as Timmie Donovan
- Judy Garland as Cricket West
- Sophie Tucker as Mother Ralph
- C. Aubrey Smith as Sir Peter Calverton
- Ronald Sinclair as Roger Calverton
- Forrester Harvey as Wilkins
- Charles D. Brown as 'Click' Donovan
- Frankie Darro as 'Dink' Reid
- Henry Kolker as 'Doc' Godfrey
- Helen Troy as Hilda
- Francis X. Bushman as Racing Steward (uncredited)
- Robert Homans as Police Officer Higgins (uncredited)

== Production ==
Following the sensational audience reaction to Judy Garland singing "You Made Me Love You (I Didn't Want to Do It)" to a picture of Clark Gable in Broadway Melody of 1938 (1937), Garland was rushed into shooting two films back to back, this and the more musically elaborate Everybody Sing, which was held for later release in 1938.

This was the first film to team Mickey Rooney and Judy Garland. Arthur Freed and Nacio Herb Brown wrote two songs for Garland, but only one, "Got A Pair of New Shoes", made it into the final film. "Sun Showers" was also recorded by Garland, which still survives today.

Ronald Sinclair substitutes for Freddie Bartholomew, for whom this role was originally intended, but whose voice had changed, according to accounts later told by Judy Garland. The chemistry between Mickey and Judy was readily apparent in this film and MGM would team them several more times until Words and Music in 1948. The film features a cameo appearance from Frankie Darro as Dink Reid.

== Box office ==
According to MGM records the film earned $426,000 in the US and Canada and $305,000 elsewhere resulting in a loss of $29,000.

== See also ==
- List of films about horses
- List of films about horse racing
