= Pursuit (1935 film) =

1935 American action film directed by Edwin L. Marin

- Directed by: Edwin L. Marin
- Screenplay by: Wells Root
- Based on: Wild Goose, Golden Goose; 1935 story in Complete Magazine by Lawrence G. Blochman
- Produced by: Lucien Hubbard; Ned Marin
- Starring: Chester Morris; Sally Eilers; Scotty Beckett; Henry Travers; C. Henry Gordon; Dorothy Peterson
- Cinematography: Charles G. Clarke; Sidney Wagner
- Edited by: George Boemler
- Music by: William Axt
- Production company: Metro-Goldwyn-Mayer
- Distributed by: Metro-Goldwyn-Mayer
- Release date: August 9, 1935
- Running time: 60 minutes
- Country: United States
- Language: English

Pursuit is a 1935 American action film directed by Edwin L. Marin and written by Wells Root. The film stars Chester Morris, Sally Eilers, Scotty Beckett, Henry Travers, C. Henry Gordon and Dorothy Peterson. The film was released on August 9, 1935, by Metro-Goldwyn-Mayer.

== Plot ==
Pilot Mitch Mitchell (Chester Morris) is asked to whisk a young child, Donny (Scotty Beckett), from California into Mexico by the youth's mother, who is involved in a nasty custody dispute with her sister. Mitch agrees to take on the job, but he must also take along Maxine (Sally Eilers), who works for an agency hired to bring the child back. She's agreed to help the boy escape, but the three must still avoid detection. Things come crashing to a head in Mexico.

== Cast ==
- Chester Morris as Mr. "Mitch" Mitchell
- Sally Eilers as Maxine Bush
- Scotty Beckett as Donald McCoy "Donny" Smith
- Henry Travers as Thomas "Tom" Reynolds
- C. Henry Gordon as Nick Shawn
- Dorothy Peterson as Mrs. McCoy
- Granville Bates as Auto Camp Proprietor
- Minor Watson as Hale
- Harold Huber as Jake
- Dewey Robinson as Jo-Jo
- Erville Alderson as Cop

== Critical reception ==
Variety gave a negative review and described the film as "75 solid minutes of chase with nothing to relieve the monotony." They commented that Morris and Eilers spend most of the picture "in the front seat of an automobile" where they "carry on one of those wise-cracking, sez-you, I-hate-your-guts 'friendships' until they clinch at the finish", but that the script didn't provide the dialogue necessary to make it effective. Only Scotty Beckett's performance was well received, with Variety calling him a "cute kid who conducts himself well before the camera."
