= Behind Prison Gates =

1939 film directed by Charles Barton

- Theatrical release poster
- Directed by: Charles Barton
- Screenplay by: Arthur T. Horman; Leslie T. White
- Produced by: Wallace MacDonald
- Starring: Brian Donlevy; Julie Bishop; Joseph Crehan; Paul Fix; George Lloyd; Dick Curtis
- Cinematography: Allen G. Siegler
- Edited by: Richard Fantl
- Production company: Columbia Pictures
- Distributed by: Columbia Pictures
- Release date: July 28, 1939
- Running time: 63 minutes
- Country: United States
- Language: English

Behind Prison Gates is a 1939 American crime film directed by Charles Barton and written by Arthur T. Horman and Leslie T. White. The film stars Brian Donlevy, Julie Bishop, Joseph Crehan, Paul Fix, George Lloyd and Dick Curtis. The film was released on July 28, 1939, by Columbia Pictures.

== Plot ==
Detective Norman Craig takes the identity of dead bank robber Red Murray in order to go into prison without raising suspicions, he starts looking for three other bank robbers, but one day his partner is found dead in his cell and now Norman also has to find his partner's murderer.

== Cast ==
- Brian Donlevy as Norman Craig / Red Murray
- Julie Bishop as Sheila Murray
- Joseph Crehan as Warden O'Neil
- Paul Fix as Petey Ryan
- George Lloyd as Marty Conroy
- Dick Curtis as Capt. Simmons
- Richard Fiske as Lyman
- Lester Dorr as Floyd
