= Mothers Cry =

1930 film

- Lantern slide
- Directed by: Hobart Henley
- Screenplay by: Lenore J. Coffee
- Based on: Mothers Cry; 1930 novel by Helen Grace Carlisle
- Produced by: Robert North
- Starring: Dorothy Peterson; Helen Chandler; David Manners; Sidney Blackmer; Evalyn Knapp
- Cinematography: Gilbert Warrenton
- Edited by: Frank Ware
- Music by: David Mendoza; Erno Rapee
- Production companies: First National Pictures; The Vitaphone Corporation
- Distributed by: Warner Bros. Pictures
- Release date: December 7, 1930 (U.S.)
- Running time: 76 minutes
- Country: United States
- Language: English

Mothers Cry is a 1930 American pre-Code drama film released by First National Pictures, a subsidiary of Warner Bros. Pictures, and directed by Hobart Henley. The movie stars Dorothy Peterson, Helen Chandler, David Manners, Evalyn Knapp and Sidney Blackmer. The film is based on the popular novel of the same name written by Helen Grace Carlisle. Boris Karloff is said to have appeared in this film uncredited, but that is disputed in some sources.

== Plot ==
The film is focused on the life of widowed mother Mary Williams and her struggles to raise her four children. Daniel, her eldest, torments her and his siblings throughout his childhood and grows up to be a criminal. Younger son Arthur grows up to be a successful architect. Daughter Jennie loves domestic work and homelife and is courted by Karl Muller, a wealthy older gentleman. The other daughter, Beattie, grows up to be an idealistic dreamer.

One day Daniel doublecrosses some gangsters, who beat him up, and he disappears for three years, returning with a moll whom he introduces as his wife. Meanwhile, Jennie has married Muller. Detectives trail Daniel to his mother's house as a suspect in a holdup and he's sent to prison. Daniel's return drives away Beattie, who ends up doing secretarial work at a Palm Beach hotel. There, she is seduced by a married man, who later pays her off to leave. Daniel reappears at the house with a blackmail scheme and ends up shooting and murdering his own sister Beattie. He is convicted of cold-blooded murder and sent to the electric chair. The film ends with Mary finding consolation in her two remaining children.

== Cast ==
- Dorothy Peterson as Mary Williams
- Helen Chandler as Beattie Williams
- David Manners as Arthur 'Artie' Williams
- Evalyn Knapp as Jenny Williams
- Sidney Blackmer as Mr. Gerald Hart
- Edward Woods as Daniel 'Danny' Williams
- Jean Laverty as Sadye Noonan Williams
- Patrick H. O'Malley Jr. as Frank Williams
- Boris Karloff uncredited (disputed in some sources)

== Preservation ==
A censored version of this film survives which is missing at least two minutes of footage. It had been prepared for re-release after June of 1934 to remove pre-code material. This shorter version has been broadcast on television and cable. The film has been released on DVD by the Warner Archive Collection.

The Library of Congress has long held a copy of the surviving version of this film.
