= Ronald Sinclair =

New Zealand actor and film editor

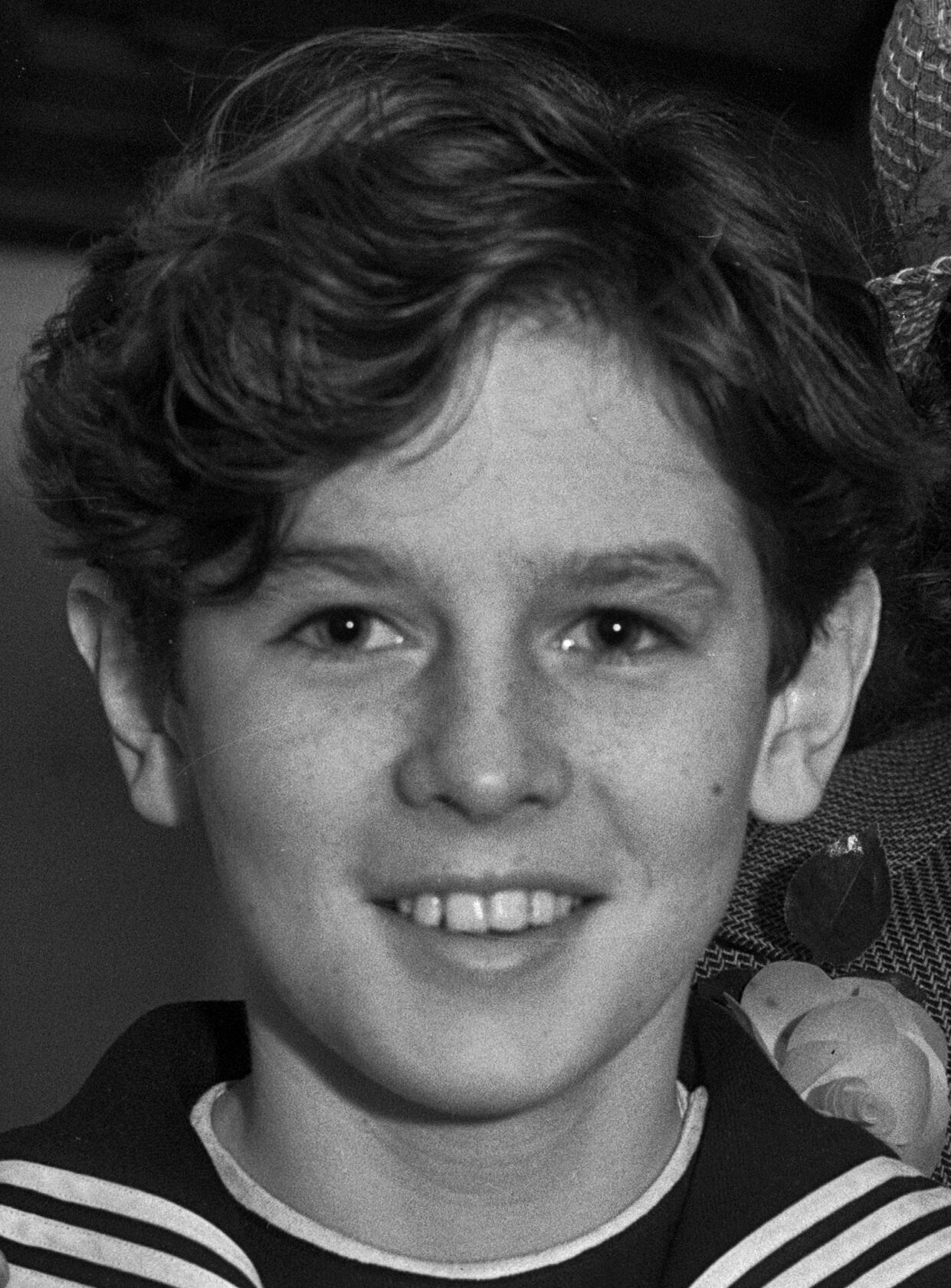
- Born: Richard Arthur Hould; 21 January 1924; Dunedin, New Zealand
- Died: 22 November 1992 (aged 68); Woodland Hills, California, U.S.
- Occupations: Film editor; actor
- Years active: 1936–1989
- Spouse: Carol A. Larsen (m. 1961)
- Children: 1

Ronald Sinclair (21 January 1924 – 22 November 1992), born Richard Arthur Hould and sometimes credited as Ra Hould or Ron Sinclair, was a New Zealand actor and film editor.

== Early years ==
Sinclair was the son of Arthur Hould and Amy Beatrice Hould.

== Early career ==
Sinclair was a juvenile player turned film editor who retained his celebrity in his native New Zealand long after the end of his Hollywood acting career. Sinclair's feature credits include William Wellman's The Light That Failed, Tower of London, Alexander Korda's That Hamilton Woman, Raoul Walsh's Desperate Journey, and Thoroughbreds Don't Cry with Mickey Rooney and Judy Garland. He also appeared in a series of children's adventure films featuring the Five Little Peppers. Sinclair also starred in the 1938 adaptation of Charles Dickens' A Christmas Carol, starring Reginald Owen. He played young Scrooge.

== Late career ==
He served as a soldier during World War II. After that, he resumed work in 1955, and began a long, fruitful collaboration with producer-director Roger Corman, which led to a busy career in low-budget independent filmmaking. Sinclair edited Corman's directorial debut, Swamp Women, and went on to work on at least a dozen of Corman's other films including Day the World Ended, The Intruder, Thunder Alley, The Raven and The Trip. He also edited a number of films by another low-rent auteur with big ideas, Bert I. Gordon: The Amazing Colossal Man, Invasion of the Saucer Men, War of the Colossal Beast, Attack of the Puppet People, and The Spider.

He was also the President of the California Branch of the Humane Society of the United States. Sinclair died from respiratory failure at the Motion Picture & Television County Home on 22 November 1992. He was cremated and his ashes were scattered. He was survived by his wife, Carol, and son, Richard.

== Filmography ==
Year	Title	Role	Notes
1936	Beloved Enemy	Jerry	Film debut
1937	A Doctor's Diary	Michael Fielding	
1937	Dangerous Holiday	Ronnie Kimball	
1937	Boots and Saddles	Spud – aka Edward, Earl of Grandby	
1937	Thoroughbreds Don't Cry	Roger Calverton	
1938	A Christmas Carol	Young Scrooge	
1939	They Made Me a Criminal	J. Douglas Williamson	Uncredited
1939	Five Little Peppers and How They Grew	Jasper King	
1939	Tower of London	Boy King Edward	
1939	The Light That Failed	Dick as a Boy	
1940	The Earl of Chicago	Master Gerald Kilmount	
1940	Five Little Peppers at Home	Jasper King	
1940	Out West with the Peppers	Jasper King	
1940	Five Little Peppers in Trouble	Jasper King	
1941	That Hamilton Woman	Josiah	
1942	Desperate Journey	Flight Sergeant Lloyd Hollis	Final film
