= Clarence Kolb =

American vaudeville comedian (1874–1964)

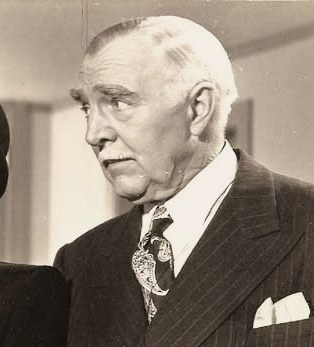
- Kolb in Lost Honeymoon (1947)
- Born: Clarence William Kolb; July 31, 1874
- Died: November 25, 1964 (aged 90); Hollywood, California, U.S.
- Occupation: Actor
- Years active: 1916–1957
- Spouse: May Cloy (m. 1915)

Clarence William Kolb, sometimes given as C. William Kolb, (July 31, 1874 – November 25, 1964) was an American vaudeville performer and actor known for his comedy routines that featured a Dutch dialect.

== Biography ==
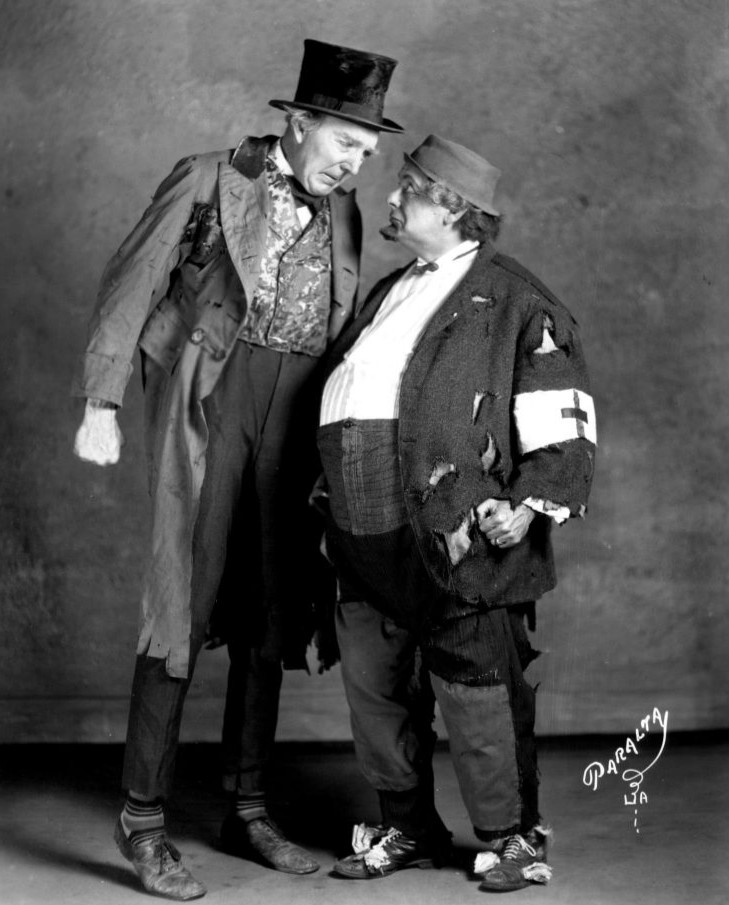
Kolb (left) and Max Dill

Kolb started out as one half of a vaudeville comedy team, Kolb and Dill, with Max Dill. They styled their act on the famous team of Weber and Fields. In addition to their stage work, they appeared in a series of short films and a feature-length movie in 1917. Afterwards, Kolb made a return to vaudeville, only returning to the movies in the late 1930s.

In 1935, Kolb left the act to work in films as a character actor, eventually appearing in 75 feature films. He became famous for portraying similar characters in several films, usually, a businessman or politician. He is best remembered for his role as Henry Kilbourne, the flustered father in the multi-Academy Award-nominated hit comedy film Merrily We Live (1938), and as the corrupt mayor in the comedy His Girl Friday (1940). On television, he was known for his role Mr. Honeywell in the sitcom My Little Margie (1952). Kolb played himself in his final movie appearance, Man of a Thousand Faces (1957), opposite Danny Beck (who played the late Max Dill).

On September 1, 1917, Kolb married dancer May Cloy (whose birth name was Mabel S. Larsen). They remained married until his death.

Kolb died on November 25, 1964 at the Orchard Gables Sanitarium in Hollywood. He was 90 years old.

== Partial filmography ==
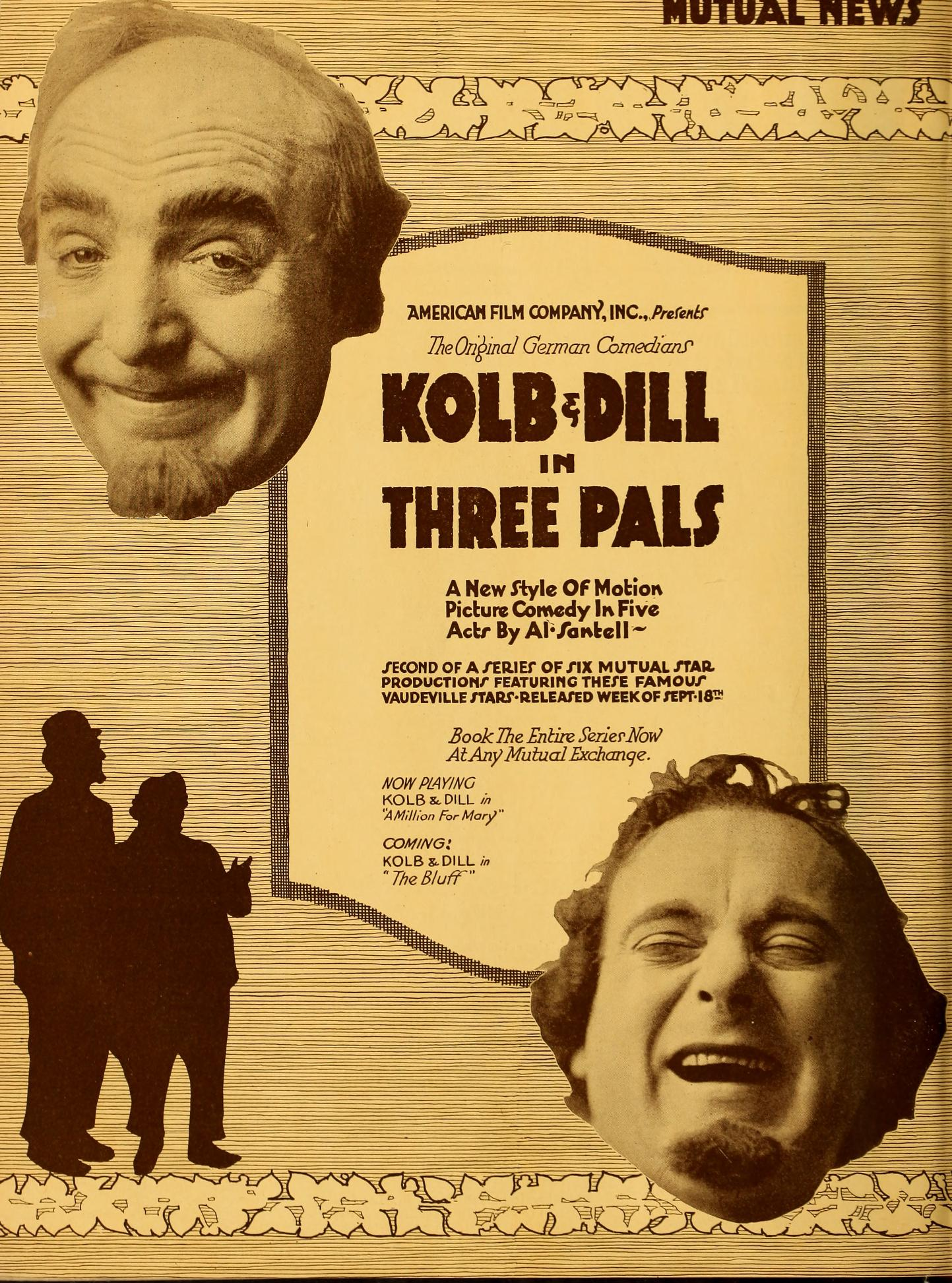
Three Pals (1916)

- A Million for Mary (1916) - Louie
- The Three Pals (1916) - Louie
- Bluff (1916) - Louie
- Peck o' Pickles (1916) - Rudolph Schlitz
- Lonesome Town (1916) - Louie
- Glory (1917) - Louie Bohn
- Beloved Rogues (1917) - Louie Vandergriff
- Two Flaming Youths (1927) - Kolb - as Kolb and Dill
- Fury (1936) - Durkin's Friend (uncredited)
- After the Thin Man (1936) - Cousin Lucius (uncredited)
- Maid of Salem (1937) - Town Crier (uncredited)
- The Toast of New York (1937) - Cornelius Vanderbilt
- Portia on Trial (1937) - John Condon
- Wells Fargo (1937) - John Butterfield
- Gold Is Where You Find It (1938) - Senator Walsh
- Merrily We Live (1938) - Mr. Kilbourne
- Give Me a Sailor (1938) - CaptainTallant
- Carefree (1938) - Judge Travers
- The Law West of Tombstone (1938) - Sam Kent
- Honolulu (1939) - Mr. Horace Grayson
- I Was a Convict (1939) - John B. Harrison
- Society Lawyer (1939) - Mr. Leonard
- It Could Happen to You (1939) - Alfred Wiman
- Good Girls Go to Paris (1939) - Ted Dayton Sr.
- Five Little Peppers and How They Grew (1939) - Mr. King
- Our Leading Citizen (1939) - Jim Hanna
- Beware Spooks! (1939) - Commissioner Lester Lewis
- The Amazing Mr. Williams (1939) - Police Captain McGovern
- His Girl Friday (1940) - Mayor
- Five Little Peppers at Home (1940) - Mr. King
- The Man Who Talked Too Much (1940) - E.A. Smith
- No Time for Comedy (1940) - Richard Benson
- Tugboat Annie Sails Again (1940) - J.B. Armstrong
- Michael Shayne, Private Detective (1940) - Brighton
- Caught in the Draft (1941) - Col. Peter Fairbanks
- Blossoms in the Dust (1941) - Texas Senator T.R. Cotton (uncredited)
- Nothing But The Truth (1941) - Mr. Van Dusen
- The Night of January 16th (1941) - Tilton
- Bedtime Story (1941) - Collins
- You're in the Army Now (1941) - General Winthrop
- Hellzapoppin' (1941) - Andrew Rand
- True to the Army (1942) - Gen. Marlowe
- The Sky's the Limit (1943) - Harvey J. Sloan (uncredited)
- The Falcon in Danger (1943) - Stanley Harris Palmer
- True to Life (1943) - Mr. Huggins
- Standing Room Only (1944) - Glen Ritchie
- Irish Eyes Are Smiling (1944) - Leo Betz
- Something for the Boys (1944) - Colonel Grubbs (uncredited)
- Three Is a Family (1944) - Mr. Steele
- What a Blonde (1945) - Charles DaFoe
- Road to Alcatraz (1945) - Philip Angreet
- The Kid from Brooklyn (1946) - Mr. Austin
- White Tie and Tails (1946) - Mr. Arkwright
- The Pilgrim Lady (1947) - Prof. Rankin
- Lost Honeymoon (1947) - Mr. Evans
- Fun on a Weekend (1947) - Quigley Quackenbush
- The Hal Roach Comedy Carnival (1947) - Cornelius Belmont Sr., in 'Fabulous Joe'
- The Fabulous Joe (1947) - Cornelius Belmont, II
- Blondie in the Dough (1947) - J.T. Thorpe
- Christmas Eve (1947) - Judge Alston
- Impact (1949) - Darcy
- Adam's Rib (1949) - Judge Reiser
- The Rose Bowl Story (1952) - 'Gramps' Burke
- Shake, Rattle & Rock! (1956) - Judge McCombs
- Man of a Thousand Faces (1957) - Clarence Kolb (final film role)
