= Harriett Lothrop =

American writer (1844–1924)

Harriett M. Stone Lothrop
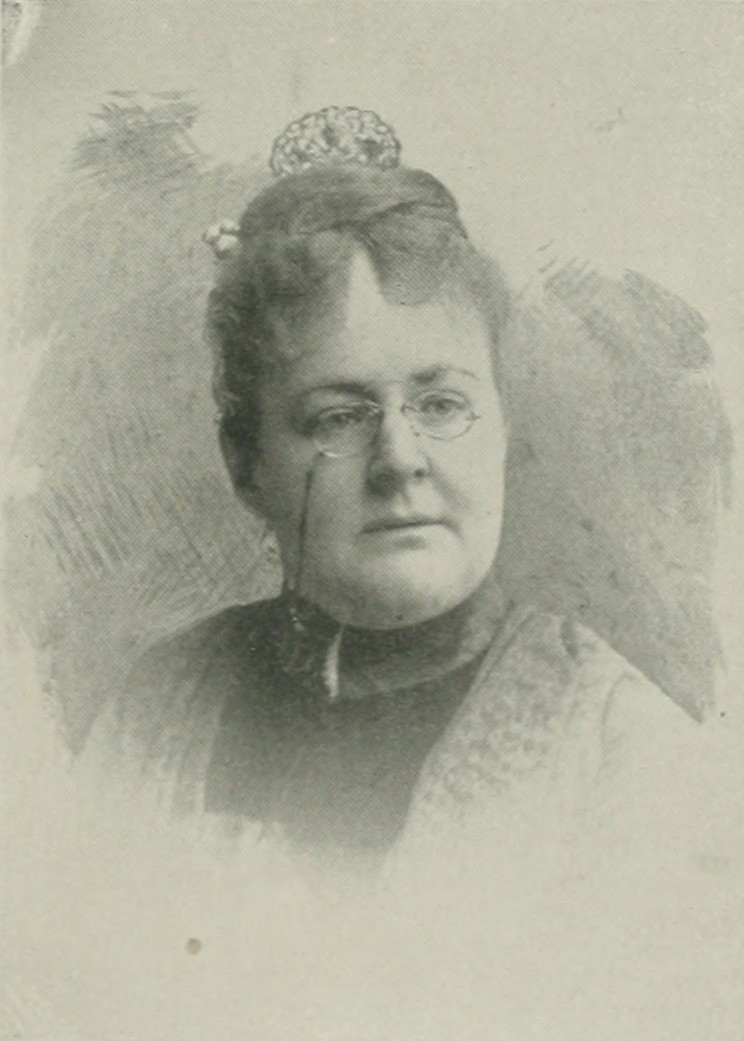
- Circa 1897
- Born: Harriett Mulford Stone; June 22, 1844; New Haven, Connecticut
- Died: August 2, 1924 (aged 80)
- Education: Miss Dutton's School, Grove Hall, New Haven (1862)
- Occupation: Writer
- Spouse: Daniel Lothrop
- Children: Margaret Lothrop (daughter, b. circa 1883)
- Writing career
- Pen name: Margaret Sidney
- Genre: Children's fiction
- Notable works: Five Little Peppers and 11 sequels

Harriett Lothrop was an American author also known by her pseudonym Margaret Sidney (June 22, 1844 – August 2, 1924). In addition to writing popular children's stories, she ran her husband Daniel Lothrop's publishing company after his death. After they bought The Wayside country house, they worked hard to make it a center of literary life. She wrote the popular Five Little Peppers series. Lothrop was also the founder of the Children of the American Revolution.

== Early life ==
Harriett Mulford Stone was born in New Haven, Connecticut, in 1844.The daughter of New Haven architect Sidney Mason Stone, she was “brought up in an atmosphere of culture and learning enhanced by free access to her father’s large library.” From early girlhood she “delighted in creating imaginary people”. She was educated at seminaries near her home and graduated from Miss Dutton's School at Grove Hall in New Haven in 1862. While a student there “she displayed such mental alertness, combined with retentive memory and a great imaginative and poetic talent that she was marked for future success.”

She traveled extensively in the United States, and began creating literary compositions early in life. According to a Hartford Courant article, "she wrote constantly but destroyed manuscripts".

== Career ==
She published nothing until 1878 when, at the age of 34, she began sending short stories to Wide Awake, a children's magazine in Boston. Two of her stories, "Polly Pepper's Chicken Pie" and "Phronsie Pepper's New Shoes", proved to be very popular with readers. Ella Farman, the editor of the magazine, requested that Stone write more.

The success of Harriett's short stories prompted her to write Five Little Peppers and its 11 sequels. The original novel was first published in 1881, the year that Stone married Daniel Lothrop. Daniel had founded the D. Lothrop Company of Boston, who published Harriett's books under her pseudonym, Margaret Sidney.

== Home ==
Harriett and Daniel may have both had an interest in history and in famous authors. In 1883, they purchased the house in which both Louisa May Alcott and Nathaniel Hawthorne had lived. Nicknamed The Wayside, the house is located in Concord, Massachusetts. The year after Harriett and Daniel moved into the house, Harriett gave birth to their daughter, Margaret, at the age of 40.

== Life after her husband's death ==
Daniel Lothrop died on March 18, 1892, when Harriett was 48 and their daughter was just 9 years old. There was a gap in the release of the Five Little Peppers books from 1892 to 1897, while Harriett continued to run the publishing company Daniel founded. Eventually, she sold the company, which later became Lothrop, Lee & Shepard Co. It continued to publish Harriett's books under the name Margaret Sidney when Harriett resumed writing the Five Little Peppers series.

Memorial to Lothrop at the Children of the American Revolution headquarters

She died at the age of 80. Her archival material is housed at the University of Florida's George A. Smathers Libraries.

== Children of the American Revolution ==
Lothrop is known as the founder of the Children of the American Revolution. She first proposed the idea at the 4th Continental Congress of the Daughters of the American Revolution on February 22, 1895. The organization was soon chartered and was officially founded on April 5, 1895. Her intention was "for the training of young people in true patriotism and love of country". Lothrop was the lifeblood of this organization, she served as the first Senior National President from 1895-1901 and her daughter Margaret was "Member #1".

== Other interests ==
Lothrop circa 1900

Harriett was an early member of the Massachusetts Society of the Daughters of the American Revolution (DAR). In 1894 she became the founder and first regent (president) of the newly formed Old Concord Chapter of the DAR in Concord, MA.

She loved traveling overseas, but spent many winters in California where the climate was more agreeable.

Alongside her writing career, Stone had a deep interest in historical homes and buildings and worked hard to preserve them. These include:

- The Wayside, where she lived with her family
- Orchard House, which belonged to the Alcott family and was next door to the Wayside
- Grapevine Cottage, where Ephraim Wales Bull developed the Concord grape
- The Tolman House in Dorchester, Massachusetts built during the colonial period

In later years, Stone's daughter Margaret Lothrop championed to have her childhood home, The Wayside, declared a National Historic Landmark. It was made so in 1963.

== Works ==
Lothrop eventually wrote more than 30 books—including the Five Little Peppers series, not listed here.

- So as by Fire (Boston, 1881)
- Half Year at Bronckton (1882)
- The Pettibone Name (1883), a novel of New England life
- What the Seven Did (1883)
- Who Told it to Me (1884)
- Ballad of the Lost Hare (1884)
- The Golden West (1885)
- How they Went to Europe (1885)
- Hester, and other New England Stories (1886)
- The Minute-Man (1886)
- Two Modern Little Princes (1887)
- Dilly and the Captain (1887)
- St. George and the Dragon (1888)
- Old Concord : Her Highways and Byways (1888, 1893)
- The Judges' Cave; Being a Romance of the New Haven Colony in the Days of the Regicides, 1661 (1900)
- A Little Maid of Concord Town (1898), on a patriotic theme
- A Little Maid of Boston Town (1910), also on a patriotic theme
