= Charles Pratt (disambiguation) =

Charles Pratt (1830–1891) was an American businessman and philanthropist.

Charles Pratt may also refer to:

- Charles Pratt, 1st Earl Camden (1714–1794), English judge, civil libertarian and defender of American cause
- Charles Pratt (Askenootow) (1816–1888), member of Canada's Cree-Assiniboine tribe, interpreter at Treaty 4 negotiations
- Charles E. Pratt (1841–1902), American composer of popular music, musician and band leader
- Charles C. Pratt (1854–1916), American Republican legislator from Pennsylvania
- Charles Stuart Pratt (1854–1921), American writer of children's literature
- Charles Millard Pratt (1855–1935), American oil industrialist and philanthropist; son of Charles Pratt
- Charles A. Pratt (1909–1989), American judge
- Charles Edward Pratt (1911–1996), American-Canadian Olympic rower and architect, a/k/a Ned Pratt
- Charles Awotwi Pratt, Ghanaian theologian and priest
- Chuck Pratt (1939–2000), American rock climber, instructor and mountain guide
- Charles Pratt Jr. (born 1955), American television writer, producer and director
- Charlie Pratt (born 1986), American medalist at 2021 Racquetball World Championships
- Charles Pratt and Company, an oil company formed by Charles Pratt and Henry H. Rogers

== See also ==
- Charles Pratt Huntington, architect
- Charles Platt (disambiguation)
