= Herman Umbstaetter =

American editor and writer (1851–1913)

- Born: Herman Daniel Umbstaetter; February 26, 1851; Parma, Ohio, U.S.
- Died: November 25, 1913 (aged 62); Lovell, Maine, U.S.
- Occupation: Businessman
- Known for: Founding The Black Cat
- Spouse: Nelly Littlehale (m. 1893)
- Children: 1

Herman Daniel Umbstaetter (February 26, 1851 – November 25, 1913) was an American businessman and founder of the magazine The Black Cat.

== Early life ==
Umbstaetter was born on February 26, 1851, in Parma, Ohio the son of Charles Umbstaetter and Helen Hege. He later moved to Cleveland.

== Career ==
Umbstaetter had become wealthy in the advertising and publishing business in Baltimore by the late 1880s. In 1886, he attempted to start a magazine in Boston, proposing to price it at ten cents, but was unable to get funding. He worked in the United Kingdom for a while, but lost his fortune and returned to the US, spending some time in California before settling in Boston in 1891. He again attempted to find capital to start a magazine and was again rebuffed. He finally launched The Black Cat in 1895, having saved enough money to start it on his own account.

He began to have health problems in 1912, and that year he sold The Black Cat to Samuel Cassino, the publisher of Little Folks.

== Personal life ==
He married artist Nelly Littlehale in Boston in 1893. They had a daughter called Amo.

== Death ==
On November 25, 1913, Umbstaetter and Howard Palmer went on a hunting expedition on the shore of Kezar Lake in the Maine woods. Umbstaetter stumbled as he tried to cross a stone wall and fell, resulting in his rifle accidentally discharging and a bullet passing through the left side of his body. He was taken to a cottage and a surgeon and trained nurse were obtained. He died at two o'clock in the afternoon from his wounds.
