= Elizabeth Cumings Pierce =

American children's author

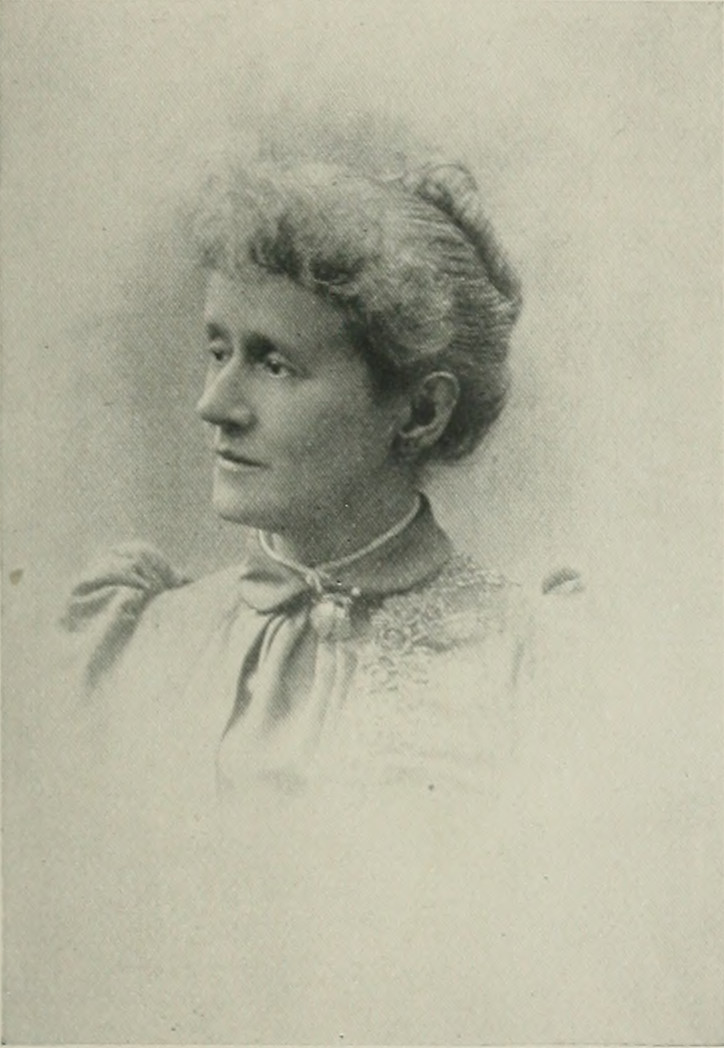
- Born: August 10, 1853; Fulton
- Died: February 2, 1930 (aged 76); Belvidere

Elizabeth Cumings Pierce (August 10, 1853 – February 2, 1930) was an American author. She published stories and books for children under her maiden name, Elizabeth Cumings. She also published a series of humorous stories about ministerial life as the Rev. Uriah Xerxes Buttles, D.D.

Elizabeth Cumings Pierce was born in Fulton, New York, the daughter of De Witt C. Cumings and Harriet Perkins Cumings. In 1869, she married the Rev. George Ross Pierce, a Presbyterian minister. They relocated to Belvidere, Illinois in 1894.

Pierce published children's stories under her maiden name in publications including Wide Awake, The Independent, and St. Nicholas. Her book Miss Matilda Archambeau Van Dorn was serialized in Wide Awake in 1891. Her stories about ministerial life written under the name Uriah Xerxes Buttles appeared in the Christian Union (later renamed The Outlook) and Music. She also published work in Harper's Weekly, Lippincott's Magazine, Scientific Monthly, and Belford's Magazine.

== Bibliography ==
- Miss Matilda Archambeau Van Dorn (1892)
- A Happy Discipline: a two years' apprenticeship to life (1895)
- Josephine in War Time (1914)
