= Emma L. Shaw =

American journalist

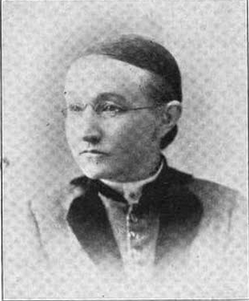
- Photo in Michigan Woman's Press Association, 1893
- Born: June 1840; Junius, New York, U.S.
- Died: February 1924 (aged 83)
- Occupations: Tailor; farmer; magazine and book editor
- Writing career
- Language: English
- Years active: 1870-1922

Emma L. Shaw (June 1840 – February 1924) was an American Nonconformist who worked as a tailor and a farmer before becoming a juvenile literature book editor and associate editor of Good Health magazine in Battle Creek, Michigan. In about 1870, Shaw began her literary work in Michigan. With her friend, Ella Farman, Shaw purchased a small farm near Battle Creek and here, for several years, Farman wrote juvenile books that were edited by Shaw, and published by D. Lothrop & Co. In 1875, Shaw and Farman began editing Wide Awake in their sitting-room. The growing needs of this periodical caused the editors to move to Boston, but Shaw soon returned to Michigan and became a charter member of the Michigan Woman's Press Association. She worked on several journals published by the Good Health Publishing Company of Battle Creek, where she was an editor for many years.

== Early life ==
Emma L. Shaw was born in Junius, New York, June 1840, and lived there until she was six years old, when her parents moved to Clyde, New York. At thirteen, with her mother, she moved to Chautauqua County, now Jamestown, New York, where she lived for seven years. While in New York, Shaw spent much of her time studying and teaching, and it was there that she met Ella Farman. (Note: McElhaney (1998) refers to her as Ella Harman.)

After her mother married a second time, Shaw accompanied her mother and stepfather to their farm near Battle Creek. She spent a few years there, and began corresponding with Farman. Shaw suggested that they share a home together.

== Career ==
Shaw and Farman were interested in the lives of Alice and Phoebe Cary, sibling writers who lived together, and hosted gatherings of notable people. Shaw and Farman resolved that they, too, would found a home. Shaw received a small inheritance, which allowed them to buy a small farm, and they filled the farmhouse with old donated furniture. They made Turkish trousers of sturdy cloth, which were worn under dresses that were short enough to allow them freedom of movement.

Using the name of D. A. Shepherd, Farman wrote a fictionalized story of their adventures, Two Girls That Tried Farming, which was published in The Atlantic Monthly. The story was later expanded, and published as a book under Farman's own name.

During the winter months Farman began writing children's stories, which were improved by Shaw's editing. The stories were submitted to D. Lothrop & Co., and publisher Daniel Lothrop was so impressed with the work he proposed Shaw and Farman edit a new children's magazine Wide Awake, first published in 1875. They first edited the magazine at their home, but then they sold the farm and moved to Boston.

Shaw was never happy in Boston and, after Ella Farman's 1877 marriage, she returned to Battle Creek, Michigan. For a time she taught school, and then she became the editorial assistant to Dr. John Harvey Kellogg at the Good Health Publishing Company, a position she held until her failing eyesight prevented further work. Shaw became the associate editor of Good Health magazine, and those she worked with admired her independent streak, and they accepted her mannish clothing styles.

S. Isadore Miner was on the editorial staff of Good Health, and she became friends with Shaw. The friendship continued after Miner accepted a position with the Grand Rapids Telegram-Herald, while Shaw remained with Good Health.

In 1916, the Michigan Women's Press Association elected Shaw as a life member "in consideration of her long and faithful membership."

== Failing health and death ==
Shaw became blind in 1922, and died in February 1924.
