= Elbridge Streeter Brooks =

American writer

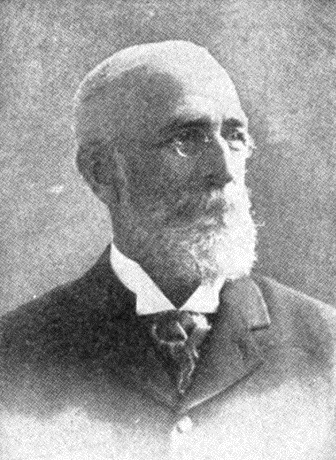
- Born: April 14, 1846; Lowell, Massachusetts
- Died: January 7, 1902 (aged 55); Somerville, Massachusetts
- Occupations: author, editor and critic
- Writing career
- Period: 1880 - 1902

Elbridge Streeter Brooks (April 14, 1846 – January 7, 1902) was an American author, editor, and critic. He is chiefly remembered as an author of numerous works of fiction and nonfiction for children, much of it on historical or patriotic subjects. His byline for most of his writing was Elbridge S. Brooks.

== Life and family ==
Brooks was born on April 14, 1846, in Lowell, Massachusetts, the son of Universalist minister Elbridge Gerry Brooks and Martha Fowle (Monroe) Brooks. He was raised in Bath, Maine, Lynn, Massachusetts and New York City, where his father served in various churches. He was educated in the public schools of Lynn and New York and entered the Free Academy (later the College of the City of New York) in 1861, which he left during his junior year to seek work. Later, in 1887, he received an A.M. degree from Tufts College. As an adult he lived in Philadelphia and New York City until removing to Somerville, Massachusetts, his mother's home town, in 1887. He married, in 1870, Hannah-Melissa Debaun of New York. They had two daughters, Geraldine and Christine Brooks. Geraldine would also become an author, revising some of her father's works for new editions as well as writing her own works. Brooks died January 7, 1902, in Somerville and interred at Mount Auburn Cemetery. He was survived by his wife and daughters, though the younger, Christine, died the next year.

== Career ==
Brooks took a job as a clerk with the publishing house of D. Appleton & Company in 1865, and continued working professionally for various publishers and magazines for the remainder of his life. He was employed by Ford & Company, Sheldon & Company and Henry Holt & Company in the early 1870s before joining E. Steiger & Company in 1876 as head of its English educational and subscription department. He went on to become a member of the staff of Publishers Weekly in 1879, literary editor and dramatic critic for the Brooklyn Daily Times from 1883–1885, associate editor of St. Nicholas Magazine from 1884–1887, and an editor for D. Lothrop & Company from 1887 through his death, aside from the period of 1892-1895, when the firm went through financial difficulties and reorganization. He edited the series The Story of the States for Lothrop. He was also editor of Wide Awake from 1891-1893.

Brooks started writing fiction, poetry and plays for children in 1879, his work appearing in St. Nicholas, Wide Awake, Harper's Young People, Golden Days, and The Independent. Much of this material was afterwards collected into book form, published by D. Lothrop and others. Brooks ultimately penned nearly seventy book-length works, mostly drawn from history, and American history in particular; a number of these, however, were revisions or expansions of earlier works issued under new titles. Some of his patriotic works were issued under the auspices of the Sons of the American Revolution and the Daughters of the American Revolution. Brooks also wrote some material for adult audiences, including one of his earliest books, a biography of his own father.

He was a member of the Authors' Club of New York.

== Reception ==
Brooks' works were dismissed by some critics as "machine-made," but proved enduringly popular, some continuing to be reprinted many years after his death.

== Bibliography ==
=== Century Book series ===
- The Century Book for Young Americans; Showing How a Party of Boys and Girls Who Knew How to Use Their Eyes and Ears Found Out All About the Government of the United States (1894) (Internet Archive e-text)
- The Century Book of Famous Americans; the Story of a Young People’s Pilgrimage to Historic Homes (1896) (Internet Archive e-text)
- The Century Book of the American Revolution (1897) (Internet Archive e-text)
- The Century Book of the American Colonies; the Story of the Pilgrimage of a Party of Young People to the Sites of the Earliest American Colonies (1900) (Internet Archive e-text)

=== Biography ===
- The Life-Work of Elbridge Gerry Brooks, Minister in the Universalist Church (1881) (Internet Archive e-text)
- Historic Boys; Their Endeavors, Their Achievements and Their Times (1885) (Google Books e-text)
- Historic Girls; Stories of Girls Who Have Influenced the History of Their Times (1887) (Google Books e-text of 1911 edition) (Project Gutenberg Entry:)
- Young People of History; Their Endeavors, Their Achievements and Their Times (1914; omnibus edition of Historic Boys and Historic Girls)
- The True Story of Christopher Columbus, Called the Great Admiral (1892) (Project Gutenberg Entry:)
- Great Men's Sons; Who They Were, What They Did, and How They Turned Out; a Glimpse at the Sons of the World's Mightiest Men from Socrates to Napoleon (1895) (Internet Archive e-text)
- The Boy Life of Napoleon : Afterwards Emperor of the French (1895)
- The Story of Miriam of Magdala, Sometimes Called the Magdalen (1895)
- The True Story of George Washington; Called the Father of His Country (1895) (Internet Archive e-text)
- The Inspiring History of George Washington, First President of the United States (1896)
- The True Story of Abraham Lincoln, the American; Told for Boys and Girls (1896) (Internet Archive e-text)
- The True Story of U. S. Grant, the American Soldier, Told for Boys and Girls (1897)
- True stories of great Americans for young Americans : telling in simple language suited to boys and girls, the inspiring stories of the lives of George Washington, John Paul Jones, Benjamin Franklin, Patrick Henry, Robert E. Lee, George Peabody, Abraham Lincoln, Ulysses S. Grant, Jas. A. Garfield, Robert Fulton, Cyrus W. Field, Thos. A. Edison (1897) (Google Books e-text)
- The True Story of Benjamin Franklin, the American Statesman (1898)
- Historic Americans; Sketches of the Lives and Characters of Certain Famous Americans Held Most in Reverence by the Boys and Girls of America (1899)
- The True Story of Lafayette, Called the Friend of America (1899)
- The Heroic Life of Abraham Lincoln the Great Emancipator (1902)
- The Heroic Life of General George Washington, First President of the United States (1902)
- The Heroic Life of General U.S. Grant : General of the Armies of the United States (1902)
- The Heroic Life of John Paul Jones, the First Captain of the United States Navy (1902)

=== History ===
- Storied Holidays; a Cycle of Historic Red-Letter Days (1887)
- The Story of the American Indian; His Origin, Development, Decline and Destiny (1887) (Internet Archive e-text)
- The Story of New York (1888) (Google Books e-text)
- The Story of the American Sailor in Active Service on Merchant Vessel and Man-of-War (1888) (Internet Archive e-text)
- The Story of the American Soldier in War and Peace (1889) (Internet Archive e-text)
- The Story of the United States, Told for Young People (1891)
- The True Story of the United States of America; Told for Young People (1897)
- The American Sailor; Being the Complete and Connected Story of the Development and Deeds of the American Sailor on Merchant Vessel and Man-of-War from the Discovery of America to 1900 (1899)
- The American Soldier; Being the Story of the Fightingman of America, From the Conquistador to Rough Rider; From 1492 to 1900 (1899)
- The Story of Our War with Spain (1899)
- The Story of the Nineteenth Century of the Christian Era (1900) (Internet Archive e-text)

=== Operetta ===
- David the Son of Jesse, or, The Peasant, the Princess, and the Prophet; a Sacred Operetta in Two Parts (with Ellsworth C. Phelps) (1883) (Google Books e-text)
- A Dream of the Centuries, and Other Entertainments for Parlor and Hall (with others) (1889) (Internet Archive e-text)
- The land of Nod, an Operetta for Young Folks (1928)

=== Memorial books ===
- Longfellow Remembrance Book; a Memorial for the Poet’s Reader-Friends (1888)
- Tennyson Remembrance Book; a Memorial for the Poet’s Reader Friends (1893)

=== Other ===
- In No-Man’s Land; a Wonder Story (1885)
- An aggressive Universalism : an address delivered before the New York Universalist Club, February 18, 1886 (1886)
- Chivalric Days; and the Boys and Girls Who Helped to Make Them (1886)
- In Leisler’s Times; an Historical Story of Knickerbocker New York (1886) (Google Books e-text)
- A Son of Issachar; a Romance of the Days of Messias (1890)
- Great Cities of the World (1890)
- Golden years : stories and poems (1892)
- Heroic Happenings Told in Verse and Story (1893)
- A Boy of the First Empire (1895)
- The Long Walls; an American Boy’s Adventures in Greece; a Story of Digging and Discovery, Temples and Treasure (with John Alden) (1896) (Google Books e-text)
- Under the Tamaracks, or, A Summer with General Grant at the Thousand Islands (1896)
- A Son of the Revolution; Being the Story of Young Tom Edwards, Adventurer, and How He Labored for Liberty and Fought it Out With His Conscience in the Days of Burr's Conspiracy (1898)
- Children all; a book of stories and verses for little people (1898)
- The Master of the Strong Hearts; a Story of Custer’s Last Rally (1898) (Internet Archive e-text of 1900 edition)
- In Blue and White; the Adventures and Misadventures of Humphrey VanDyne, Trooper in Washington’s Life-Guard (1899) (Internet Archive e-text)
- On Wood Cove Island; or a Summer with Longfellow on the New England Coast (1899)
- Stories of the Old Bay State (1899) (Internet Archive e-text)
- In defence of the flag; a boy’s adventures in Spain and the West Indies during the battle year of our war with Spain (1900)
- The Godson of Lafayette; Being the Story of Young Joe Harvey, and How He Found the Way to Duty in the Days of Webster and Jackson and the Conspiracy of That American Adventurer Eleazer Williams Sometimes Called “The False Dauphin” (1900)
- With Lawton and Roberts : a Boy’s Adventures in the Philippines and the Transvaal (1900) (Internet Archive e-text)
- Under the Allied Flags a Boy’s Adventures in the International War against the Boxers and China (1901)

== General references ==
- "AUTHOR OF BOY STORIES DEAD," obituary in The Chicago Daily Tribune, January 8, 1902, page 4.
- Bowerman, Sarah G. "Elbridge Streeter Brooks," article in Dictionary of American Biography. American Council of Learned Societies, 1928-1936.
- "BROOKS--March 28," obituary of Christine Brooks in The New York Times, April 5, 1903, page 17.
- "ELBRIDGE S. BROOKS," obituary in The New York Times, January 8, 1902, page 7.
- Johnson, Rossiter, ed. The Twentieth Century Biographical Dictionary of Notable Americans: Volume I. Boston: The Biographical Society, 1904.
- Who's Who in America, a Biographical Dictionary of Notable Living Men and Women of the United States, 1901-1902. Chicago: A. N. Marquis & Company.
