= Ella Farman =

American writer and editor (1837–1907)

Ella Farman Pratt
- Born: November 1, 1837; Augusta, New York
- Died: May 22, 1907 (aged 69); Warner, New Hampshire
- Occupations: Writer; editor
- Spouse: Charles Stuart Pratt (m. 1877)
- Children: 1
- Writing career
- Pen name: Ella Farman; D. A. Shepherd
- Genres: Children's book and magazine

Eliza Anna Farman Pratt (1837–1907) (pen names, Ella Farman and Dorothea Alice Shepherd) was an American writer of children's literature, best known for editing Wide Awake magazine for 16 years, starting in 1875.

== Early life ==
Farman was born November 1, 1837 in Augusta, New York, the daughter of Rev. Tural Tufts Farman and Hanna Burleson Farman. She was educated at a girls’ school in New York, where she met Emma L. Shaw, who became a close friend. For a time Farman and Shaw worked as teachers, before they decided to move to Michigan and try to earn their living by farming.

== Literary career ==
In about 1870 Eliza Farman began writing in earnest, submitting work under the name of Ella Farman. In 1875 she used the name of D. A. Shepherd when she sold a story entitled Two Girls that Tried Farming to The Atlantic Monthly. When the story was expanded, and published as a book by D. Lothrop and Company in 1879, the pen name of Dorothea Alice Shepherd was used once more.

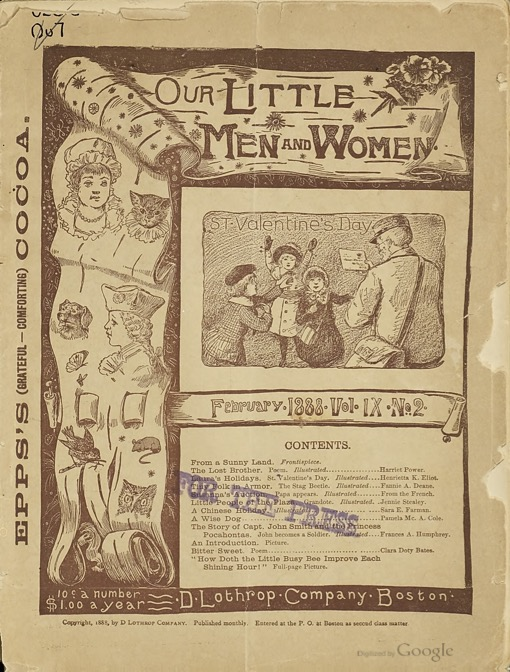
Cover of Our Little Men and Women, 1888, Volume 9, Issue 2

Farman wrote children's stories, and for the first few years she received editing help from her friend Emma Shaw. Several children's books were published by D. Lothrop Company. When publisher Daniel Lothrop decided to publish a children's magazine entitled Wide Awake he chose Farman as editor. She edited Wide Awake from 1875 until 1891, with the assistance of co-editor Charles Stuart Pratt. Farman and Pratt wed in 1877.

Farman and Pratt also worked on other D. Lothrop Company children's magazines. They edited Babyland from 1877 to 1892 and then from 1894 to 1897. Farman also edited Our Little Men and Women (1880–1898).

From 1897 until shortly before her 1907 death Farman and Charles Stuart Pratt edited Little Folks, a children's magazine published by S. E. Cassino Company, in Salem, Massachusetts. Pratt continued on as editor until 1909. Until at least 1912 the Little Folks Contents page stated “Edited from foundation to May, 1909, by Charles S. and Ella Farman Pratt.”

During her work as editor Farman published approximately 20 books, most of them for children.

== Personal life ==
Eliza Anna Farman wed Charles Stuart Pratt on November 11, 1877, For most of their married life the couple lived in Warner, New Hampshire. Farman Pratt had a son, Ralph Farman Pratt, born July 7, 1878. He became a landscape painter.

Farman Pratt was in poor health for several years, before dying at her home from myocarditis (inflammation of heart muscle) and neurasthenia (fatigue, anxiety) on May 22, 1907. She was buried in South Weymouth, Massachusetts.

== Selected works ==
- Anna Maylie (1873)
- A Little Woman : A Story for Other Little Women (1873)
- Anna Maylie : A Story of Work. (1873)
- A Girl's Money (1874)
- A White Hand (1875)
- Mrs. Hurd's Niece : Six Months of a Girl's Life (1876)
- The Doll Doctor, and Other Stories, (1877)
- Sugar Plums (1877)
- Good-for-Nothing Polly (1877)
- Little Miss Mischief and Her Happy Thoughts (1878)
- How Two Girls Tried Farming (as Dorothea Alice Shepherd) (1879)
- The Home Primer (1882)
- Nursery Primer (1882)
- Rosabell's Adventure (1883)
- Christmas Snowflakes (1883)
- Yule Tide (1884)
- Polly Himself (1886)
- The Cooking Club of Tu-Whit Hollow (1886)
- All the World Over : Interesting Stories of Travel, Thrilling Adventure and Home Life (1892)
- Mrs. White's Party : and Other Stories (1894)
- Happy Children (1896)
- A Dozen Darlings and Their Doings (1898)
- The Play Lady : a Story for Other Girls (1900)
- The Little Cave-Dwellers (1901)
- "Chicken Little" : Picture Guessing Story for Little Children (1903)
- The Little Owls at Red Gates (1903)
- Dear Little Sheila : a Picture Guessing Story for Children (1905)
- Grandma Crosby's Household. a Story for Girls (1907)
