= Dorothy B. Waage =

American numismatist

Dorothy Boylan Waage (January 8, 1905 - December 11, 1997) was an American numismatist, who published the catalogue of 14,000 Greek, Roman, Byzantine and Crusader coins excavated by Princeton University in the 1930s. This has been described as "the best catalogue of Antiochene coinage".

== Early life ==
Born in Kalamazoo, she attended Kalamazoo Central High School and Kalamazoo College. She married Frederick O. Waage on August 28, 1935. He was Professor of the History of Art and Archaeology at Cornell University from 1945 to 1971.

== Numismatics ==
Both she and her husband worked on the archaeological and numismatic assemblages from the excavations undertaken at Antioch, which were undertaken by Princeton University from 1932 to 1939. In particular Waage worked on the non-Islamic material from the site, producing a catalogue of the 14,000 Greek, Roman, Byzantine and Crusader coins. It was published in 1952 as Antioch-on-the-Orontes. IV.: Part Two: Greek, Roman, Byzantine and Crusaders' Coins.

Her analysis included the recognition of a new variant monogram on bronze coins of Seleucus II, originating the Antioch. She took an innovative approach to numismatic cataloguing, arranging the coins from Antioch according to period, but featuring the reverse side first. Her work was described by Professor Kevin Butcher as "the best catalogue of Antiochene coinage".

== Personal life ==
Waage kept a life-long correspondence with the soprano Lotte Lehmann.
