= Charles Platt =

Charles Platt may refer to:

- Charles Platt (author) (born 1945), English science-fiction writer
- Charles A. Platt (1861–1933), American landscape gardener and architect of "American Renaissance" movement
- Charles Z. Platt (1773–1822), New York State Treasurer 1813–1817
- Charlie Platt, American wrestling announcer for Continental Championship Wrestling during 1980s
- Chuck Platt, American bassist for punk rock band Good Riddance since 1990s

== See also ==
- Charlie Comyn-Platt (born 1985), English football defender/midfielder
- Loula Roberts Platt (1863–1934), also known as Mrs. Charles M. Platt, American suffragist
- Charles Pratt (disambiguation)
