= The Black Cat (US magazine) =

Literary magazine in Boston, Massachusetts

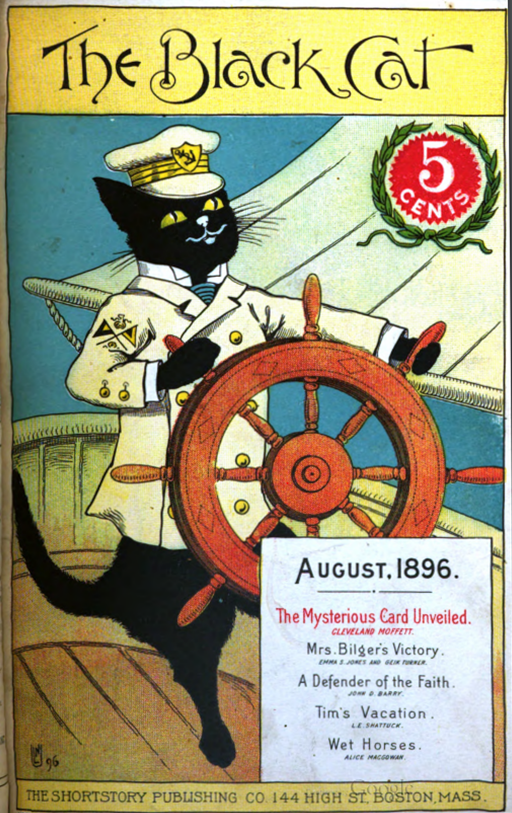
Cover of The Black Cat August 1896 with illustration by Nelly Littlehale Umbstaetter Murphy

The Black Cat was an American fiction magazine launched in 1895 by Herman Umbstaetter, initially published in Boston, Massachusetts. It published only short stories, and had a reputation for originality and for encouraging new writers. Umbstaetter's editorial approach was unusual in several ways: the cover price was low, at five cents; he paid based on merit instead of story length; and he was willing to buy stories by new authors rather than insisting on well-known names. He frequently ran story contests to attract amateur writers. The magazine was immediately successful, and its circulation was boosted by the appearance in an early issue of "The Mysterious Card", by Cleveland Moffett, which was so popular that two print runs of the issue it appeared in sold out.

Many well-known writers appeared in its pages. Two of the best-known were Jack London, whose 1899 story "A Thousand Deaths" sold just as he was about to give up attempting to become a writer, and Henry Miller, whose first published work was several short fiction critiques published in The Black Cat in 1919. The magazine's icon, a black cat that appeared on almost every cover for many years, was drawn by Umbstaetter's wife, Nelly Littlehale Umbstaetter. Others who sold stories to The Black Cat included O. Henry, Rex Stout, and Clark Ashton Smith.

In 1912, Umbstaetter sold the magazine to Samuel Cassino, the publisher of Little Folks. Cassino, and later his son, Herman, published the magazine from Salem, Massachusetts, until 1919. Circulation, at about 50,000, was much lower than in Umbstaetter's day. In 1916, a deal was struck with Essanay Studios to make films of stories from The Black Cat. The magazine was sold to Fox Film in 1919 and survived only another year. It was revived in 1922 by William Kane, and in early 1923, with Kane estimating circulation down to only 15,000, it ceased publication permanently.

== Publication history ==
=== Umbstaetter ===
The Black Cat was founded by Herman Umbstaetter, who had become wealthy in the advertising and publishing business in Baltimore by the late 1880s. (Note: The article in The Editor cited here originally appeared in the December 4, 1897, issue of the New York Press.) In 1886, he attempted to start a magazine in Boston, proposing to price it at ten cents, but was unable to get funding. He worked in the United Kingdom for a while, but lost his fortune and returned to the US, spending some time in California before settling in Boston in about 1891. He again attempted to find capital to start a magazine and was again rebuffed. He finally launched The Black Cat in 1895, having saved enough money to start it on his own account.

The Black Cat, April 1896 issue; the artist is Nelly Littlehale Umbstaetter

Umbstaetter planned to publish only short stories, and to acquire some of the stories through contests designed to attract amateur writers, rather than by paying well-established writers the market rate. His budget for fiction was about the same as it would have needed to be for a more conventional approach, but by publicizing the contests he hoped to attract more readers and get a wider variety of fiction. By the time he was able to put his plans into action, nearly ten years had passed since his original proposal to price it at ten cents and many other magazines had been launched at that price, so he decided to go "still further on the road of popular prices”, and set the price at five cents per issue. The price of paper had been dropping for some time, and he was not the first publisher to take advantage of it—the Ladies' Home Journal had been launched at 5 cents, and two fiction magazines, the Chap-Book and Bibelot, had recently been started at the same price. The Black Cat was launched in octavo format (about 5.5 by 8.5 inches (14 cm × 22 cm)), the same size as the dime novels of the day.

Umbstaetter was optimistic enough about the magazine's prospects to place orders for 100,000 printed copies of the cover lithograph with the Riverside Press, despite being told by the printer that the order was "suicidal". He announced in the December 1895 issue of The Black Cat that all 100,000 copies of the first issue, dated October 1895, had sold out in three weeks. (Note: For many of the issues of The Black Cat in the Internet Archive, the scan places all the advertising matter of each issue at the end of the yearly volumes. As a result, many of the links to the archived copies of issues given here are to a year-end issue, the cover date of which does not match the citation. For example, the advertisements at the back of the October 1895 issue are on pages 59–74 of the scan of the December 1896 issue. In addition, the Internet Archive scan sometimes alters its page numbering in an attempt to conform to the numbers on the scanned pages. Hence it can be necessary to scroll to find the pages in the archive. For example, the advertisement pages for the November 1895 issue of The Black Cat can be found by scrolling past page 74 in the December 1896 archive, but the page numbers given are 75–79, followed by 56–63, followed by 88.) The American News Company said in early 1896 that "no magazine ever published at any price has secured so large a sale in so short a time". Umbstaetter claimed circulation figures of 186,000 for 1896, and 120,000 or more over the next three years. (Note: Umbstaetter submitted circulation figures to both Ayers Newspaper Annual and Rowell's Newspaper Directory, two annual publications which provided advertisers with circulation figures for thousands of newspapers.) Starting in 1901, Umbstaetter sent affidavits to the newspaper annuals, showing circulation between 120,000 and just under 146,000 over the next seven years.

In the October 1896 issue, he announced that The Black Cat had paid out over $7,000 for stories during the magazine's first year, and launched a short story competition with a $1,000 first prize and another $1,100 available for the four next best stories. A condition of the competition was that all entries had to include a subscription to a year of The Black Cat, which cost 50 cents. The winners were announced the following summer, with the prize pool expanded to $2,600. The competition was repeated in 1897 and 1899, with prizes of over $4,000 each time. In 1901 non-cash prizes were added: the top prize was a trip around the world lasting 179 days, conducted by Raymond and Whitcomb, a travel company, and valued at $2,100. The second prize was a Surrey steam car, valued at $1,300, and other non-cash prizes included a piano, typewriters, and trips from Boston to San Francisco and from Boston to Cuba. There were cash prizes as well, the highest one worth $1,000.

After the next competition, which ended in July 1905 with an announcement that the planned prize amount of $10,600 would be expanded to $12,500, The Journalist published an article about Umbstaetter's methods. Stanley Johnson, the author of the article, had visited Umbstaetter's home in Back Bay, Boston multiple times during the second half of 1904, while the contest manuscripts were arriving. According to Johnson, Umbstaetter personally read nearly 8,000 of the manuscripts, and paid rewards to his manuscript readers if they found a publishable story that had been rejected by another of the readers. The next contest, the last to be run under Umbstaetter's editorship, was launched in April 1908, offering a smaller prize pool than the previous two competitions: $6,950 for ten stories. With the following issue Umbstaetter doubled the cover price to ten cents, citing increased production costs.

=== Samuel and Herman Cassino ===
Issue data for The Black Cat
	Jan	Feb	Mar	Apr	May	Jun	Jul	Aug	Sep	Oct	Nov	Dec
1895										1/1	1/2	1/3
1896	1/4	1/5	1/6	1/7	1/8	1/9	1/10	1/11	1/12	2/13	2/14	2/15
1897	2/16	2/17	2/18	2/19	2/20	2/21	2/22	2/23	2/24	3/25	3/26	3/27
1898	3/28	3/29	3/30	3/31	3/32	3/33	3/34	3/35	3/36	4/37	4/38	4/39
1899	4/40	4/41	4/42	4/43	4/44	4/45	4/46	4/47	4/48	5/49	5/50	5/51
1900	5/52	5/53	5/54	5/55	5/56	5/57	5/58	5/59	5/60	6/61	6/62	6/63
1901	6/64	6/65	6/66	6/67	6/68	6/69	6/70	6/71	6/72	7/73	7/74	7/75
1902	7/4	7/5	7/6	7/7	7/8	7/9	7/10	7/11	7/12	8/1	8/2	8/3
1903	8/4	8/5	8/6	8/7	8/8	8/9	8/10	8/11	8/12	9/1	9/2	9/3
1904	9/4	9/5	9/6	9/7	9/8	9/9	9/10	9/11	9/12	10/1	10/2	10/3
1905	10/4	10/5	10/6	10/7	10/8	10/9	10/10	10/11	10/12	11/1	11/2	11/3
1906	11/4	11/5	11/6	11/7	11/8	11/9	11/10	11/11	11/12	12/1	12/2	12/3
1907	12/4	12/5	12/6	12/7	12/8	12/9	12/10	12/11	12/12	13/1	13/2	13/3
1908	13/4	13/5	13/6	13/7	13/8	13/9	13/10	13/11	13/12	14/1	14/2	14/3
1909	14/4	14/5	14/6	14/7	14/8	14/9	14/10	14/11	14/12	15/1	15/2	15/3
1910	15/4	15/5	15/6	15/7	15/8	15/9	15/10	15/11	15/12	16/1	16/2	16/3
1911	16/4	16/5	16/6	16/7	16/8	16/9	16/10	16/11	16/12	17/1	17/2	17/3
1912	17/4	17/5	17/6	17/7	17/8	17/9	17/10	17/11	17/12	18/1	18/2	18/3
1913	18/4	18/5	18/6	18/7	18/8	18/9	18/10	18/11	18/12	19/1	19/2	19/3
1914	19/4		19/6	19/7	19/8	19/9	19/10	19/11	19/12	20/1	20/2	20/3
1915	20/4	20/5	20/6	20/7	20/8	20/9	20/10	20/11	20/12	21/1	21/2	21/3
1916	21/4	21/5	21/6	21/7	21/8	21/9	21/10	21/11	21/12	22/1	22/2	22/3
1917	22/4	22/5	22/6	22/7	22/8	22/9	22/10	22/11	22/12	23/1	23/2	23/3
1918	23/4	23/5	23/6	23/7	23/8	23/9	23/10	23/11	23/12	24/1	24/2	24/3
1919	24/4	24/5	24/6	24/7	24/8	24/9	24/10	24/11	24/12	25/1	25/2	25/3
1920		25/4	25/5	25/6	25/7	25/8	25/9	25/10	25/11	25/12		
1922	26/1, 26/2	26/3, 26/4	26/5, 26/6	26/7, 26/8	26/9, 26/10	26/11, 26/12	27/1	27/2	27/3	27/4		?
1923		28/2		?								
Issues of The Black Cat, showing volume and issue number, with two designations per month for the period when the magazine was published twice per month. See the bibliographic details section for information about some of the uncertainties in the issue numbering and changes of editor. The colors identify the editors for each issue: Herman Umbstaetter Theresa Dyer T. H. Kelly F. W. Osborne Herman Cassino H. E. Bessom; William Kane

Umbstaetter began to have health problems in 1912, and early that year he sold The Black Cat to Samuel Cassino, the publisher of Little Folks. Cassino moved the publishing offices to Salem, Massachusetts, and hired Theresa Dyer, who had been Umbstaetter's chief assistant, as editor. The September 1913 issue changed from octavo to pulp format (about 7 by 10 inches (18 cm × 25 cm)), though it did not yet switch to the cheaper pulp paper. Circulation suffered after the move to Salem; when an estimate was next reported, for 1916, circulation had dropped to 50,000.

Dyer only edited for a year or two. At about the time she left, the circulation manager of Metropolitan Magazine, T. H. Kelly, began negotiating with Cassino to purchase The Black Cat. The management of the Metropolitan refused to allow Kelly to own a magazine while working for them, but Kelly took over as editor for a while. Harold Bessom was hired as a reader while Kelly was editor, forwarding manuscripts to New York for Kelly to make the final selection. In 1915, Cassino sold the magazine to his son, Herman Cassino, who took over starting with the September issue; Herman was editor as well as owner, and fired Kelly and Bessom, intending to do all the editorial work himself. He soon found the business side of running the magazine took up too much of his time, and brought Bessom back as a reader, and eventually as the editor. At about this time, the magazine changed to using pulp paper instead of the more expensive coated stock. (Note: "Coated" paper has a layer of material over it that improves its appearance.) Neither Samuel nor Herman Cassino had continued the contests with large cash prizes that had been inaugurated by Umbstaetter, but in 1916 Herman Cassino formed a "Black Cat Club", with small cash prizes for reader submissions of their favorite stories, and a prize of $25 for the most popular story in each issue.

In 1916, Essanay Studios arranged a deal with William Kane, who later become the publisher and editor of The Black Cat, to acquire a hundred stories from the magazine to turn into "Black Cat" films, each about half-an-hour long. The plan was to release one picture a week, starting on December 5, 1916, with "The Egg", a comedy starring Richard Travers and Marguerite Clayton. Kane loaned Essanay a set of The Black Cat issues, complete from the first issue through May 1915, and received $1,250 from Essanay for the one hundred stories they selected. Essanay failed to return the magazines to Kane, who sued them for $20,000 compensation for the loss of the magazines, eventually winning his case in the US Supreme Court.

=== Fox Film and Kane ===
In October 1919, Herman Cassino sold the magazine to a company owned by Fox Film; the change took effect with the December 1919 issue. The address changed from Salem to New York, the page count increased from about 60 to over 140, and a new story contest was announced, with prizes totaling $5,000. The magazine was sold again in 1920, to another New York publisher, but ceased publication with the October 1920 issue. It reappeared in January 1922, this time published by William Kane, the owner of The Editor, a magazine for amateur writers. Kane, who was based in Highland Falls, New York, edited the magazine himself, and produced 18 more digest-sized issues, initially at fortnightly intervals; circulation was now estimated to be only 15,000. The last known issue was dated February 1923, but an April 1923 issue may have appeared.

== Contents and reception ==
=== Early issues and editorial policy ===
When The Black Cat was launched, Umbstaetter's goal was to publish stories that were "unusual and unique". This typically did not include horror: in his guidance to writers he said "we especially desire stories, in the handling of which the morbid, unnatural and unpleasant are avoided rather than emphasized". He did not have any particular kind of story or setting in mind, telling one contributor that he had "no prejudices against any kind of story, for the simple reason that we can never tell beforehand but that a prize story may come out of an unappealing subject".

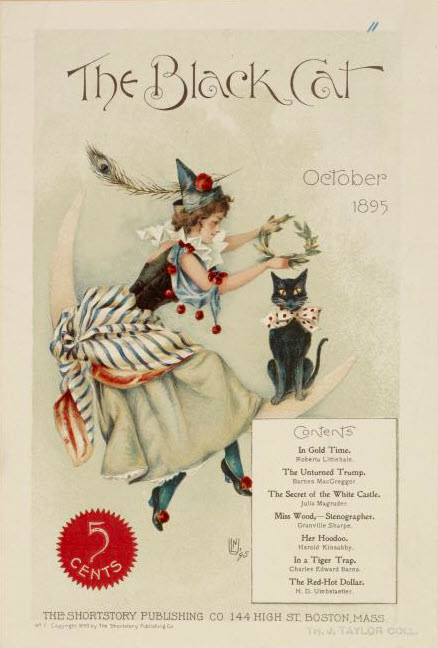
Cover of the first issue, October 1895. The artist is Nelly Littlehale Umbstaetter.

The first issue included three stories by Umbstaetter himself, two of them under pseudonyms, and four contributed by other writers. Reviews of the first issue were positive: the cover was praised as "artistic [and] exquisitely lithographed", and the stories were complimented as "the best tales, gotten up in the most fascinating form, and offered for the least money", and as "seven original, complete, and stirring tales..not floated by the reputation of the writer". This last point was later demonstrated by Charles Edward Barnes, author of "In a Tiger Trap", one of the stories in the first issue. The story was reprinted without permission in an English newspaper under the title "Iali, Which Means Forgiven", and subsequently reprinted in America. Umbstaetter sued and won damages from several publishers who had reprinted the story, and printed some of the correspondence in The Black Cat. Recounting the events in 1920, Bessom commented that the papers that reprinted it and "hailed [it] as one of the best stories" of the day had paid it no such compliments when it had first been printed. Barnes subsequently made a bet with some friends in the publishing industry that Umbstaetter would buy a good story from an unknown author in preference to a weaker story by a well-known name. To settle the bet, Barnes wrote two stories, and submitted them both to The Black Cat, one under his own name, and one under the pseudonym "S. C. Brean". Barnes won his bet: Umbstaetter rejected the story submitted under Barnes' name, and awarded one of the contest prizes to the pseudonymous story.

To this reputation for encouraging new writers The Black Cat added a reputation for originality. This was boosted early in the magazine's life by the appearance of "The Mysterious Card" by Cleveland Moffett, about a man who is given a card with an inscription that he cannot read, but which causes everyone he knows to refuse to have anything to do with him. It was printed in the February 1896 issue, and was so popular that 150,000 copies of that issue sold in three days, and a fresh print run also sold out. The mystery was explained in a sequel in the June 1896 issue, "The Mysterious Card Unveiled". Magazine historian Mike Ashley comments that "The Mysterious Card" was the most famous story to appear in The Black Cat, but that the sequel "would have been best left unwritten"; and according to Bessom's account of the magazine's history, written in 1920, writers of his day agreed that Moffett "spoiled his story by writing the sequel".

An unusual policy of Umbstaetter's was to pay for stories based on his opinion of their merit, not of their length, so that he might suggest to an author that he would increase the payment if they were to shorten the story. Umbstaetter believed that by paying "not according to length, but according to strength", and by paying high prices for stories, and avoiding serials, he would attract a loyal readership. The guidance to writers posted periodically in the magazine gave upper limits on the required word count that varied from 6,000 words to as low as 1,000 words. (Note: For example, Umbstaetter asked for stories that "do not exceed 2,000 words in length – the shorter the better" – in the July 1902 issue. In March 1898 the upper limit was 6,000 words; in January 1909 it was only 1,000 words.)

=== Contents ===
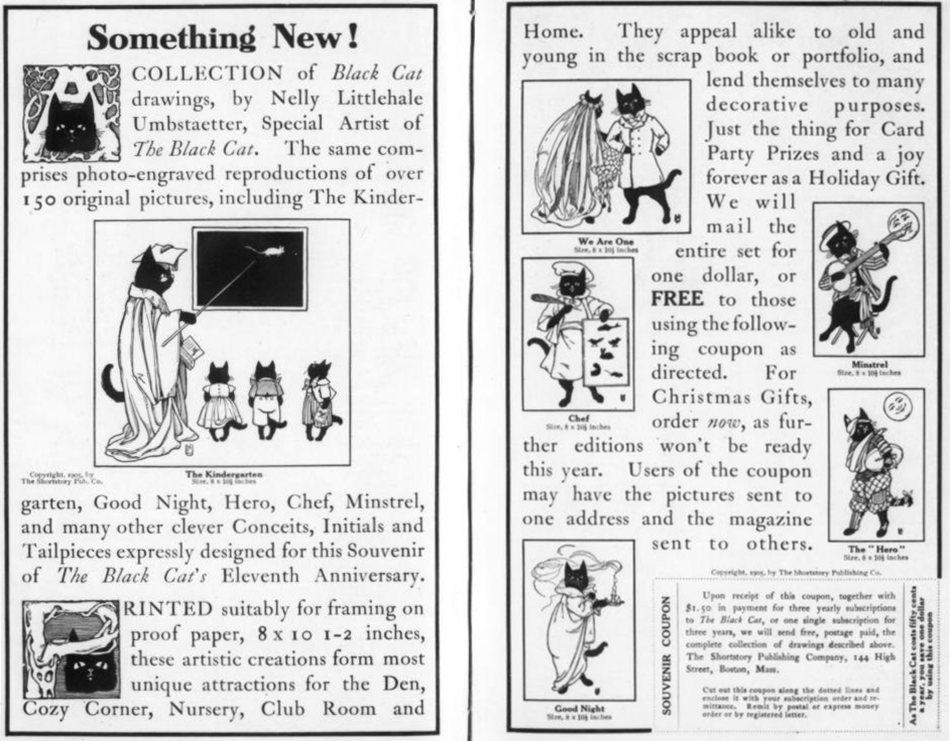
Advertisement for a collection of Nelly Littlehale Umbstaetter's drawings of the black cat featured on the cover

The first few covers were illustrated by Umbstaetter's wife Nelly Littlehale Umbstaetter, and she continued to provide most of the covers until 1913. Over 150 of her drawings, all depicting the black cat that featured on the magazine's cover, were advertised in The Black Cat as a free gift with three years worth of subscriptions.

In the May 1899 issue, Umbstaetter printed "A Thousand Deaths" by Jack London. The story, about an inventor who could revive the dead, is well-known because it saved London's writing career. London was living in poverty at the time, sending out stories in the hope of getting paid one cent per word, which he had read was the usual rate for fiction. He finally sold a 4,000-word story, but to his horror was only paid $5.00. In London's later recollection, "I was finished—finished as only a very young, very sick, and very hungry young man could be ... I would never write again." Later that same day London received a letter from Umbstaetter, responding to London's submission of "A Thousand Deaths" and asking permission to cut it in half. Umbstaetter offered $40 if London agreed. London recalled "It was the equivalent to twenty dollars per thousand, or double the minimum rate. Give permission!...And that is just precisely how and why I stayed by the writing game. Literally, and literarily, I was saved by The Black Cat short story." London also repeated the assertion made by Barnes: Umbstaetter did not buy stories based on a writer's reputation, instead being willing to "judge a story on its merits and to pay for it on its merits".

London's story was not the only one about a scientific invention; early examples include "My Invisible Friend" (February 1897), by Katherine Kip, about invisibility; "Ely's Automatic Housemaid" (December 1899), by Elizabeth Bellamy, featuring a robot; and "The Man Who Found Zero" (September 1901), by Ion Arnold, about space travel. Ashley singles out Don Mark Lemon and Frank Lillie Pollock as particularly original writers. Pollock was the author of "The Invisible City" in the September 1901 issue, about mass hypnosis. Lemon's stories included several that featured inventions related to memory, including a surgical method of transferring memories in "Doctor Goldman" (December 1900); and a way of causing amnesia in "The Mansion of Forgetfulness" (April 1907). Among Lemon's other stories was "The Lace Designers" (May 1907), in which spiders create patterns in their webs that can be used as lace designs. Clark Ashton Smith, later well-known as a writer of fantastic fiction, contributed two adventure stories with an oriental setting towards the end of Umbstaetter's time as editor. Stories on science fiction themes disappeared almost completely after Umbstaetter sold the magazine; the last notable speculative fiction story was by Harry Stephen Keeler, whose "John Jones's Dollar", in the August 1915 issue, was set in the year 3221, with the compound interest on money invested in 1921 amounting to enough to buy the entire solar system.

Henry Miller's first published writing appeared in The Black Cat in 1919, as part of the Black Cat Club started by Herman Cassino. The club paid readers one cent per word for critiques of stories; it was run as a competition, and Miller had four of his critiques printed in the summer of 1919. The first to appear was "The Unbidden Guest", a critique of a story of that name by Carl Clausen. Other well-known writers who appeared in The Black Cat included Rex Stout, O. Henry, Rupert Hughes, Susan Glaspell, Ellis Parker Butler, Holman Day, and Octavus Roy Cohen.

The new company that took over ownership of The Black Cat at the end of 1919 was owned by Fox Film, and for a couple of issues the first few pages of the magazine were taken up by still shots from current films, showing stars such as William Farnum and Dorothy Phillips. The expanded magazine size, now a standard pulp length of about 160 pages, meant that far more stories could be included in each issue.

The Black Cat was "highly influential and much imitated by other magazines", according to Ashley, who lists The White Owl, The Smart Set, The Thrill Book and Weird Tales as examples. Ashley considers it a "rather idiosyncratic publisher of science fiction and original ideas...[with] an original and clever perspective".

== Bibliographic details ==
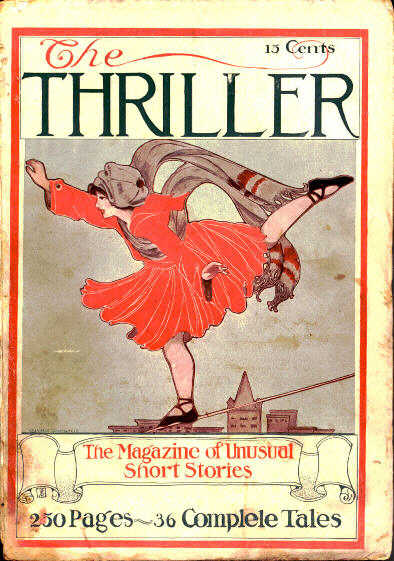
Cover of the fourth issue of The Thriller, 1917, which reprinted stories from The Black Cat; artist unknown

The Black Cat appeared on a regular monthly schedule from its first issue, dated October 1895, to October 1920, missing only the February 1914 and January 1920 issues. The publisher was initially Shortstory Publishing Co., of Boston, owned by H. D. Umbstaetter, who edited the magazine until September 1912. The editorial address changed from 144 High Street to 41–47 Pearl Street in Boston with the May 1907 issue. Samuel E. Cassino of Salem Massachusetts bought the magazine from Umbstaetter, retaining the publishing company name, and Theresa Dyer, Umbstaetter's assistant, was hired as editor. It is not clear when she was replaced: a history of the magazine that appeared in the October 1920 issue says she "shortly resigned the editorship", and was replaced by T.H. Kelly. Statements of ownership published in The Black Cat show that she remained editor until at least the October 1913 issue. No statements of ownership were published during 1914, (Note: See the individual issues.) but two bibliographic sources, Mike Ashley and Phil Stephensen-Payne, give Kelly as the editor for 1914. The 1915 statements of ownership show F. W. Osborne as editor in October 1914 and April 1915, with Herman Cassino taking over as editor no later than November 1915. Both Ashley and Stephensen-Payne cite Bessom as editor from 1915 on, but his name does not appear in the statements of ownership as editor until November 1918, and in Bessom's 1920 account of the magazine's history he records that he was a reader for Herman Cassino for some time before being made editor—in June, but he does not specify the year. Bessom remained editor during the ownership of both the New York publishers who acquired the magazine in 1919 and 1920. The publisher was Black Cat Pub. Co. when the magazine first moved to New York, changing to Black Cat Magazine Inc. with the February 1920 issue. The editor in 1922 and 1923 was the owner and publisher, William R. Kane, of Highland Falls, New York.

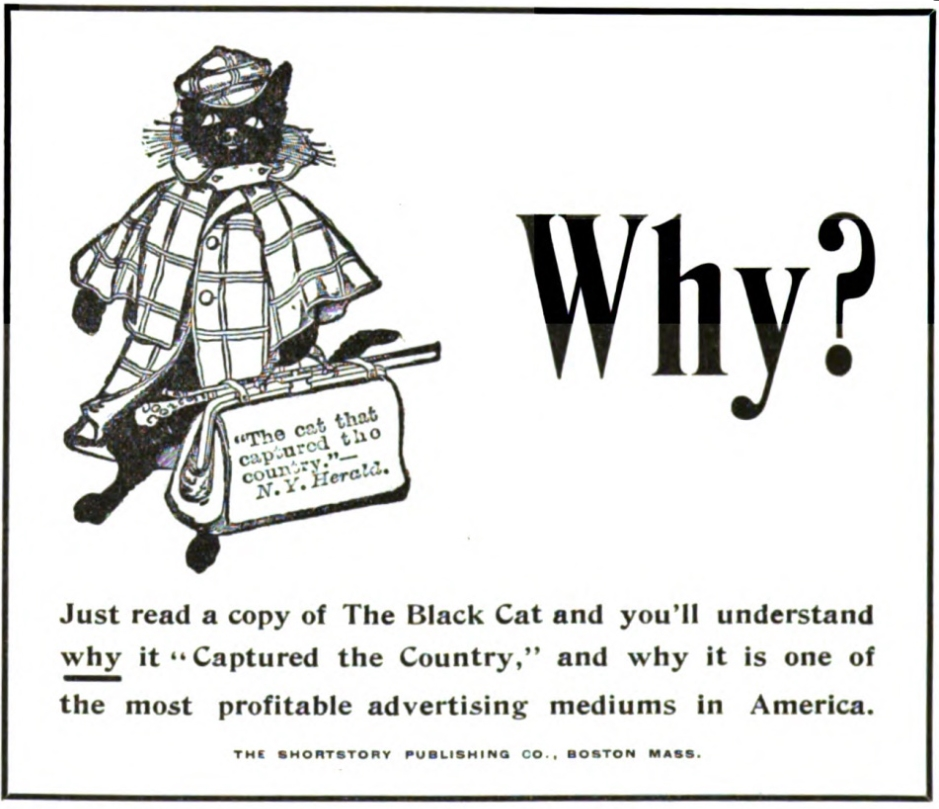
1905 advertisement for The Black Cat from the Ayers Newspaper Annual, used by advertisers to determine where to place their ads.

The magazine was monthly from the beginning until October 1920. The January 1920 issue was skipped because of a printers' strike. The revived magazine, published by Kane, produced 17 issues in 1922 and 1923, first on a bimonthly schedule (with issues dated the 10th and 25th of each month), then monthly from July, and finally bimonthly for two issues, dated December 1922 and February 1923. Ashley and Stephensen-Payne list a possible April 1923 issue, and Stephensen-Payne's bibliography does not identify the volume and issue number for the December 1922 issue.

It was initially in octavo format and priced at 5 cents, and about 60 pages. The price was raised to 10 cents in May 1908, and the format increased to pulp size in September 1913. The price rose to 15 cents in 1918, and to 20 cents in 1920; the New York issues were about 160 pages. Kane reduced the price to 15 cents again for the version issued in 1922 and 1923, and shrank it to digest size, with 36 pages initially, and as few as 18 pages for some later issues.

Unsold copies of The Black Cat were rebound and marketed under the title The Thriller. There were at least 12 issues of The Thriller, and possibly more; the first was published in 1916, and the twelfth issue (the most recent known) appeared in 1918. It is possible that The Thriller included stories from other sources than just The Black Cat.

Two anthologies of stories from The Black Cat have been published. The first, titled Through the Forbidden Gates and Other Stories, contained prize-winning stories from the first few years of the magazine. It was edited by Umbstaetter and published in 1903 by The Shortstory Publishing Co. The second was The Man Who Found Zero, edited by Gene Christie, which appeared in 2011 from Black Dog Books. A collection of Umbstaetter's own stories was published in 1911 by L. C. Page under the title The Red-Hot Dollar and Other Stories from "The Black Cat".

== Sources ==
- Anonymous (October 7, 1895). "A Captivating Cat". The Burlington Free-Press. p. 6 – via Newspapers.com.
- Anonymous (October 8, 1895). "The Black Cat Magazine". New-York Tribune. p. 11 – via Newspapers.com.
- Anonymous (October 12, 1895). "That Fascinating Cat". The Standard Union. p. 5 – via Newspapers.com.
- Anonymous (October 29, 1895). "The Most Fascinating Five Cents Worth on Earth". Argus-Leader. p. 6 – via Newspapers.com.
- Anonymous (November 15, 1895). "Rambling 'Round the Hub". Profitable Advertising. Vol. V, no. 6. pp. 180–182.
- Anonymous (December 23, 1895). "How It Succeeded". The Burlington Free-Press. p. 4 – via Newspapers.com.
- Anonymous (February 20, 1896). "A Good Many Black Cats". The Burlington Free-Press. p. 5 – via Newspapers.com.
- Anonymous (March 1898). "The New Departure". The Editor. Vol. VII, no. 3. pp. 99–103.
- Anonymous (May 1912). "News and Notes". The Writer. Vol. XXIV, no. 5. pp. 79–80.
- Anonymous (November 25, 1916). "Essanay Special Features". The Moving Picture World. p. 1161.
- Anonymous (December 9, 1916). "Complete Record of Current Films". Motography. Vol. XVI, no. 24. p. 1301.
- Anonymous (July 28, 1917). "Odd Suit by Editor's Editor". The Editor and Publisher. p. 31.
- Anonymous (December 1919). "Contents". The Black Cat. Vol. 25, no. 3. pp. 1–8.
- Anonymous (February 1920a). "Contents". The Black Cat. Vol. 25, no. 4. pp. 1–8.
- Anonymous (February 1920b). "$5,000.00 in Cash Prizes". The Black Cat. Vol. 25, no. 4. pp. 137–141.
- Anonymous (February 1920c). "Notice to Subscribers". The Black Cat. Vol. 25, no. 4. p. 144.
- Anonymous (April 10, 1922). "Finding Against Film Company". Lincoln Journal Star. p. 1.
- Ashley, Mike (1985). "The Black Cat (1895–1923)". In Tymn, Marshall B.; Ashley, Mike (eds.). Science Fiction, Fantasy and Weird Fiction Magazines. Westport, Connecticut: Greenwood Press. pp. 147–149. ISBN 0-313-21221-X.
- Ashley, Mike (2000). The Time Machines: The Story of the Science-Fiction Pulp Magazines from the Beginning to 1950. Liverpool: Liverpool University Press. ISBN 0-85323-865-0.
- N.W. Ayer & Son's American Newspaper Annual 1897. Philadelphia: N.W. Ayer & Son. 1897. p. 338. "[Listing] Boston ... Monthly, Literary, Estab. 1895, ...Shortstory Publishing Company..."
- N.W. Ayer & Son's American Newspaper Annual 1901. Philadelphia: N.W. Ayer & Son. 1901.
- N.W. Ayer & Son's American Newspaper Annual 1902. Philadelphia: N.W. Ayer & Son. 1902.
- N.W. Ayer & Son's American Newspaper Annual 1903. Philadelphia: N.W. Ayer & Son. 1903.
- N.W. Ayer & Son's American Newspaper Annual 1904. Philadelphia: N.W. Ayer & Son. 1904.
- N.W. Ayer & Son's American Newspaper Annual 1905. Philadelphia: N.W. Ayer & Son. 1905.
- N.W. Ayer & Son's American Newspaper Annual 1906. Philadelphia: N.W. Ayer & Son. 1906.
- N.W. Ayer & Son's American Newspaper Annual 1907. Philadelphia: N.W. Ayer & Son. 1907.
- N.W. Ayer & Son's American Newspaper Annual 1917. Philadelphia: N.W. Ayer & Son. 1917.
- Bessom, Harold E. (October 1920). "The Story of The Black Cat". The Black Cat. Vol. 25, no. 12. pp. 84–92.
- Cassino, H. E. (November 1915). "Statement of Ownership and Management Oct. 1st, 1915 of The Black Cat". The Black Cat. Vol. 21, no. 2. p. 59.
- Cassino, H. E. (November 1916). "Paragraphs From Our Own Portfolio". The Black Cat. Vol. 22, no. 2. p. inside front cover.
- Cassino, S. E. (October 1912). "The Black Cat (masthead)". The Black Cat. Vol. 18, no. 1. p. 1.
- Cassino, S. E. (November 1913). "Statement of the Ownership and Management of The Black Cat". The Black Cat. Vol. 19, no. 2. p. iv.
- Cassino, S. E. (January 1915). "Statement of Ownership and Management Oct. 1, 1914 of The Black Cat". The Black Cat. Vol. 20, no. 4. p. 61.
- Cassino, S. E. (June 1915). "Statement of Ownership and Management April 1, 1915 of The Black Cat". The Black Cat. Vol. 20, no. 9. p. 58.
- Cassino, S. E. (May 1918). "Statement of Ownership and Management April 1st, 1918 of The Black Cat". The Black Cat. Vol. 23, no. 8. p. 48.
- Cassino, S. E. (November 1918). "Statement of Ownership and Management October 1st, 1918 of The Black Cat". The Black Cat. Vol. 23, no. 2. p. 48.
- London, Jack (1911). "Introduction". In Umbstaetter, H. D. (1911). The Red-Hot Dollar and Other Stories from The Black Cat. Boston: L. C. Page & Company. Retrieved November 21, 2022.
- Luckett, Moya (2014). Cinema and Community: Progressivism, Exhibition, and Film Culture in Chicago, 1907—1917. Detroit, Michigan: Wayne State University Press. ISBN 978-0-8143-3726-4.
- Miller, Henry V. (May 1919). "The Unbidden Guest". The Black Cat. Vol. 24, no. 8. p. 43.
- Moffett, Cleveland (February 1896). "The Mysterious Card". The Black Cat. Vol. 1, no. 5. pp. 1–10.
- Moffett, Cleveland (August 1896). "The Mysterious Card Unveiled". The Black Cat. Vol. 1, no. 11. pp. 1–17.
- Mott, Frank Luther (1957). A History of American Magazines: 1885–1905. Cambridge, Massachusetts: Harvard University Press. OCLC 228067774.
- Rowell's American Newspaper Directory. New York: The Printers' Ink Publishing Company. 1906.
- Umbstaetter, H. D. (November 1895). "Advertisement". The Black Cat. Vol. 1, no. 2. p. 61.
- Umbstaetter, H. D. (December 1895). "The Black Cat". The Black Cat. Vol. 1, no. 3. p. 59.
- Umbstaetter, H. D. (October 1896). "$7,000 for 50 cents". The Black Cat. Vol. 3, no. 13. p. 58.
- Umbstaetter, H. D. (July 1897). "The Black Cat Prize Stories". The Black Cat. Vol. 2, no. 22. p. 62.
- Umbstaetter, H. D. (August 1897). "$100 to $1,000 Cash to Story Tellers". The Black Cat. Vol. 2, no. 23. p. inside back cover.
- Umbstaetter, H. D. (November 1897). "For Story Tellers". The Black Cat. Vol. 2, no. 26. p. 56.
- Umbstaetter, H. D. (January 1898). "A Fraud Exposed". The Black Cat. Vol. 3, no. 28. p. 62.
- Umbstaetter, H. D. (February 1898). "An Extraordinary Offer". The Black Cat. Vol. 3, no. 29. p. 60.
- Umbstaetter, H. D. (March 1898). "$4,000 Cash Prizes". The Black Cat. Vol. 3, no. 30. p. 63.
- Umbstaetter, H. D. (September 1899). "$4,200 Cash!". The Black Cat. Vol. 4, no. 48. p. xii.
- Umbstaetter, H. D. (July 1900a). "The Black Cat $5,100 Story Contest". The Black Cat. Vol. 5, no. 58. pp. ii–iii.
- Umbstaetter, H. D. (July 1900b). "The Story of The Black Cat". The Black Cat. Vol. 5, no. 58. pp. v–vi.
- Umbstaetter, H. D. (December 1901). "The Tale That Hasn't Been Told". The Black Cat. Vol. 6, no. 75. pp. 43–47.
- Umbstaetter, H. D. (July 1902). "To Story Writers". The Black Cat. Vol. 7, no. 82. p. ii.
- Umbstaetter, H. D. (June 1904). "Does Your Head Contain a Story?". The Black Cat. Vol. 9, no. 9. pp. xviii–xix.
- Umbstaetter, H. D. (January 1905). "The Black Cat Prize Story Contest". The Black Cat. Vol. 10, no. 4. pp. 39–42.
- Umbstaetter, H. D. (October 1905). "Something New!". The Black Cat. Vol. 11, no. 1. pp. vi–vii.
- Umbstaetter, H. D. (May 1907). "Removal". The Black Cat. Vol. 12, no. 12. p. i.
- Umbstaetter, H. D. (April 1908a). "Whose Money?". The Black Cat. Vol. 13, no. 7. p. ii.
- Umbstaetter, H. D. (April 1908b). "Heart to Heart". The Black Cat. Vol. 13, no. 7. p. ix.
- Umbstaetter, H. D. (February 1909). "Writers!". The Black Cat. Vol. 14, no. 5. p. viii.
- White, Michael (October 1920). "Contributing to The Black Cat". The Black Cat. Vol. 25, no. 12. pp. 93–98.
