= Old Central High School (Kalamazoo, Michigan) =

- U.S. National Register of Historic Places
- U.S. Historic district – Contributing property
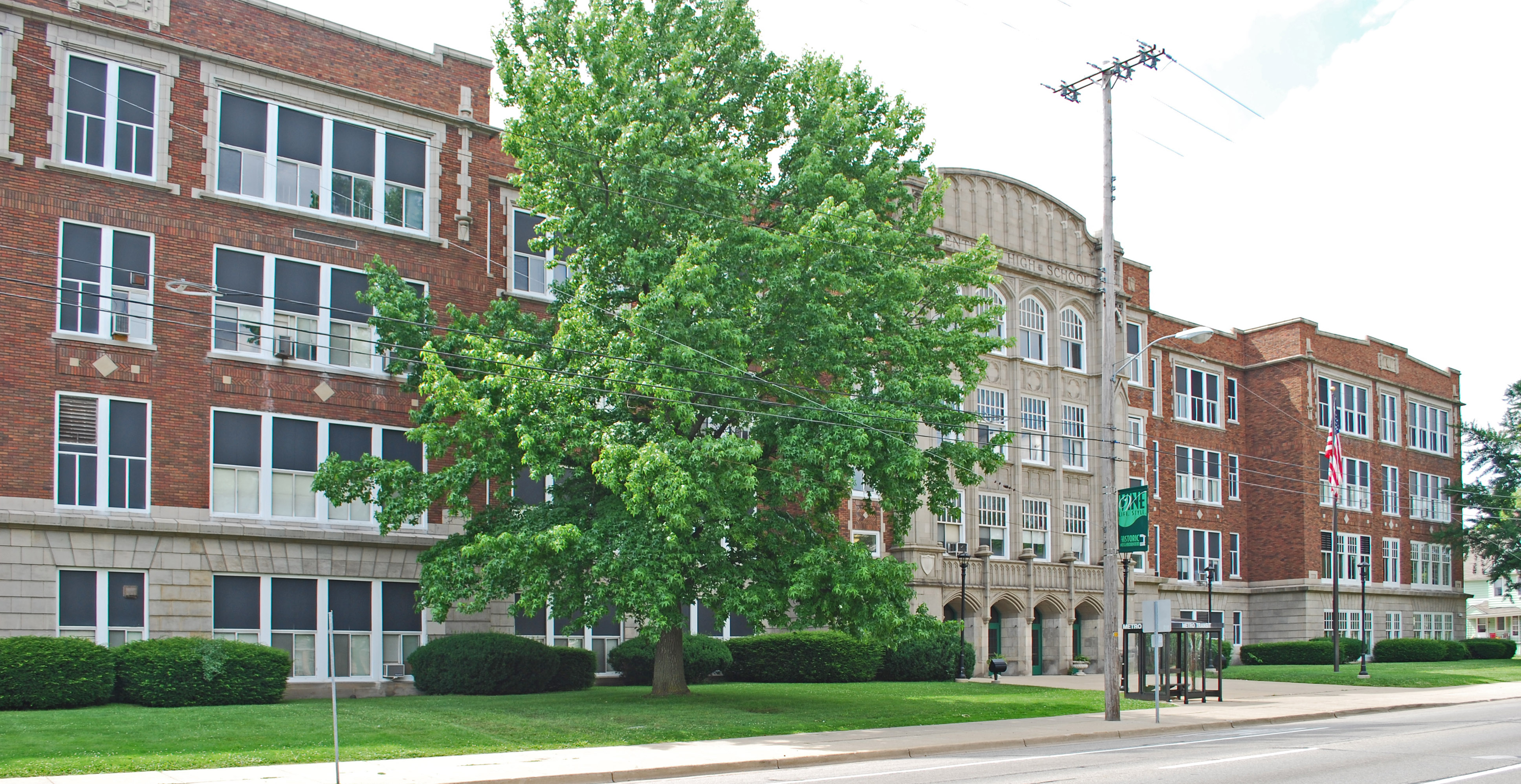

- Location within Michigan Location within the United States
- Interactive map
- Location: 714 S. Westnedge Ave., Kalamazoo, Michigan
- Coordinates: 42°17′05″N 85°35′26″W
- Area: 2.5 acres (1.0 ha)
- Built: 1912
- Architect: Rockwell A. LeRoy (1923 addition)
- Architectural style: Tudor Revival
- Part of: Vine Area Historic District (ID83000875)
- MPS: Kalamazoo MRA
- NRHP reference No.: 83000866
- Added to NRHP: August 16, 1983

Kalamazoo's Old Central High School, also known as the Community Education Center, is an educational building located at 714 South Westnedge Avenue in Kalamazoo, Michigan. It was listed on the National Register of Historic Places in 1983. As of 2022, the building is home to the adult education programs of the Kalamazoo Public Schools (KPS) as well as the Kalamazoo Area Math and Science Center (KAMSC), a magnet school for high school students from 13 local school districts who excel in the areas of math and science. It is also the home of the Chenery Auditorium, one of the performance venues for the Kalamazoo Symphony Orchestra.

== History ==
Kalamazoo originally had four schools in four separate districts. The city's first Union School, uniting these districts, was constructed on this site in 1857–58. That building was razed and replaced with a high school in 1880–81. The second school was destroyed by fire in 1887 with a replacement constructed the next year. By 1909, the high school was overcrowded and, in 1911, voters approved a bond to construct a new gymnasium and classroom buildings for the high school. The addition was completed in 1912, but by 1920 overcrowding was again a problem. In 1922, voters approved a proposal to demolish the 1898 high school building and replace it with a larger structure. Local architect Rockwell A. LeRoy designed a classroom building and auditorium that would connect to the 1912 gymnasium. The new construction was completed in 1923.

The high school again became overcrowded in the mid-1960s. In 1968, the school board approved a plan to build a new high school, which was completed in 1972. The old Central High School building was renamed the Community Education Center, and has been used for a variety of Kalamazoo Public School programs and offices including the Kalamazoo Area Math and Science Center.

== Description ==
Old Central High School is a four-story Tudor Revival structure with an E-shaped facade. It is faced with red brick and has limestone trim. The building is a block long and consists of two sections: the 1912 south wing containing a manual training and gymnasium building, and the 1923-24 main, front section.

== Kalamazoo Area Math and Science Center ==
The Kalamazoo Area Math and Science Center (KAMSC) was devised in 1981 by The Upjohn Company and established with the support of schools from the Greater Kalamazoo Area. The school officially opened in 1986 as a four-year program with the total capacity for 300 students funded with a grant of two million dollars from The Upjohn Company and administered by Kalamazoo Public Schools (KPS). Located on the fourth floor of the Old Central High School building, KAMSC's main purpose is to provide accelerated learning in mathematics and science to qualifying students in the Kalamazoo area selected through a yearly application process. Filling the math and science requirements for each student, students attend the remainder of their classes at public and private schools all over Kalamazoo County, with the primary applicant pool stemming from the Kalamazoo Regional Educational Service Agency (KRESA); while the school itself is under the authority of KPS, its students are not required to attend a KPS high school in tandem with KAMSC.
