= Miller Auditorium =

Theater in Kalamazoo, Michigan

- Interactive map of Miller Auditorium
- Full name: James W. Miller Auditorium
- Address: 1341 Theatre Dr.
- Location: Kalamazoo, Michigan
- Coordinates: 42.279422°N 85.615519°W
- Owner: Western Michigan University
- Capacity: 3,497
- Type: Auditorium

Construction
- Opened: January 12, 1968

Tenant
- Kalamazoo Symphony Orchestra

Website
- www.millerauditorium.com

James W. Miller Auditorium is a performance venue at Western Michigan University in Kalamazoo, Michigan, United States. It opened on January 12, 1968, with a ceremony that included WMU's third president, James W. Miller, for whom the auditorium was later renamed.

With a seating capacity of 3,497, Miller Auditorium is the fifth-largest auditorium in Michigan, after the Fox Theatre, Masonic Temple, Hill Auditorium and MSU Concert Auditorium.

Miller Auditorium has three separate seating sections, the Orchestra level, the Grand Tier level and the Balcony level. Each seating level is divided into two seating areas: left and right. Miller Auditorium employs students from the University, some as part of Work Study. The performances are also staffed in large part by volunteers from the community known as the Usher Corps.

Miller Auditorium is host to several kinds of performances. A Western Michigan University student organization known as the Campus Activities Board (CAB) brings in several performances each year, usually offering a discounted price for students. The CAB events run the gamut from Miller Movies (newer movies, generally costing $1 with student ID) to comedians and other speakers. The Kalamazoo Symphony Orchestra routinely plays shows throughout the year at Miller. Several Broadway shows come through Miller's doors every year, the likes of which have included: The Phantom of the Opera, Chicago, My Fair Lady, Wicked and Beauty and the Beast. Miller has also hosted Bob Dylan, Bruce Springsteen, Jeff Corwin, Dave Chappelle, Colin Mochrie and Brad Sherwood.

Every year, Miller Auditorium is also host to the three Western Michigan University commencement ceremonies, in addition to hosting ceremonies for the local community college and various secondary schools in the area. The auditorium is available for rent by community groups.
