= Cleveland Moffett =

American dramatist

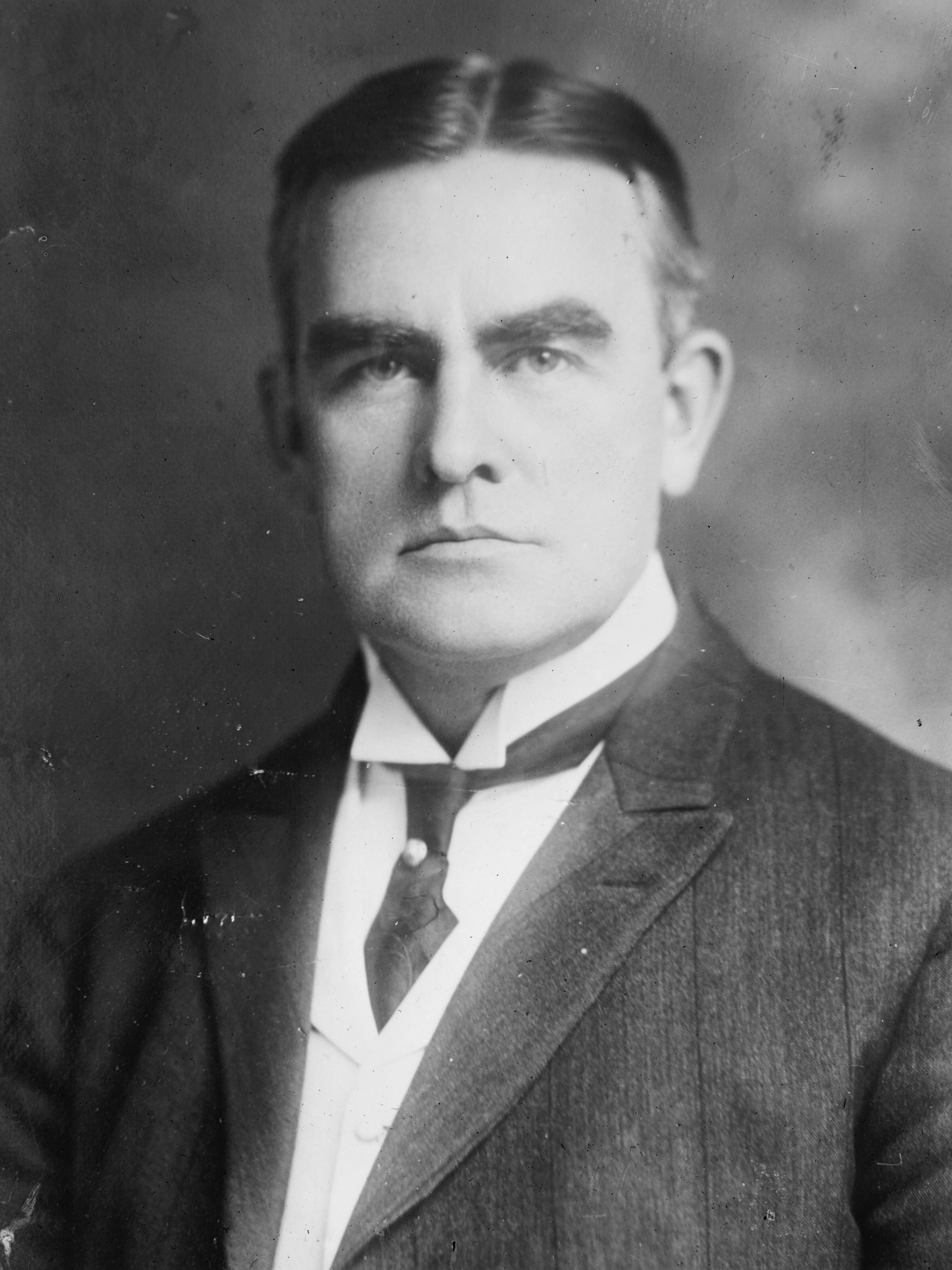
- Born: April 27, 1863; Boonville, New York, US
- Died: October 14, 1926 (aged 63); Paris, France
- Education: Yale College
- Occupations: Teacher, writer

Cleveland Moffett (April 27, 1863 – October 14, 1926) was an American journalist, author, and playwright.

Cleveland was born in Boonville, New York, the son of William Henry Moffett and Mary Jane (Cleveland). After an education at St. Paul's School in Garden City, New York, he matriculated at Yale College in Connecticut, graduating in 1883. In 1887, he joined the staff of the New York Herald, where he worked until 1892. Until 1891, his time at the Herald was spent as a foreign correspondent in Europe and Asia, where he had the opportunity to perform interviews with prominent leaders. In 1893, he became foreign editor of the New York Recorder. On February 11, 1899, he was married to Mary E. Lusk. From 1908 to 1909, he worked as Sunday editor for the Herald.

During his journalism career he contributed articles and stories to magazines and weeklies. In 1894, he translated Cosmopolis, an 1892 novel by French author Paul Bourget. His mystery short "The Mysterious Card" was published in the Boston-based The Black Cat in 1895. This work had the novelty of not revealing the answer to the puzzle posed, thereby gaining widespread attention; it was followed up a year later by "The Mysterious Card Revealed". In addition to serialized short stories, he also wrote several plays, including Money Talks (1905) and The Battle (1908). The latter was a dramatization of his 1907 novel, A King in Rags. Many of his works were set in locations outside the United States.

== Bibliography ==
- "The Mysterious Card" (1895) (short story)
- "The Mysterious Card Revealed" (1896) (short story)
- True Tales from the Archives of the Pinkertons (1897) (6 short stories)
- Real Detective Stories (1898)
- Careers of Danger and Daring (1901)
- Money Talks (1905)
- Esther Frear (1906) with Félicien Pascal
- Playing the Game (1906) with Hartley Davis
- A King in Rags (1907)
- The Battle (1908)
- Through the Wall (1909)
- Greater than the Law (1912)
- The Bishop's Purse (1913) with Oliver Herford
- The Conquest of America: A Romance of Disaster and Recovery (1916)
- Possessed (1920)
- Glint of Wings; the Story of a Modern Girl Who Wanted Her Liberty—And Got It (1922) with Virginia Hall
- The Seine Mystery (1925)
