= Kalamazoo Symphony Orchestra =

The Kalamazoo Symphony Orchestra (KSO) was founded in 1921 and is the third largest professional orchestra in Michigan. During the 2005–2006 concert season, the orchestra played for more than 100,000 people in more than 30 concerts. The orchestra's main venue is Western Michigan University's Miller Auditorium in Kalamazoo, MI.

== History ==
The orchestra played its first concert under the direction of clarinetist-volunteer Chester Z. Bronson on December 28, 1921, with only 25 musicians. Due to the efforts of Kalamazoo Symphony Society secretary and KSO Manager Leta G. Snow, by 1928, the orchestra had grown to 75 musicians and its fourth conductor, David Mattern. In 1934, the orchestra named Dr. Herman Felber, Jr. conductor, a post he would continue to fill for 25 years. Dr. Felber oversaw the first auditions for youth soloists. During the 1940s, several outstanding soloists were featured with the orchestra, including Artur Rubinstein, Isaac Stern, and Georges Enesco.

The 1959 season was the last under Dr. Felber's direction. During the 1960 season the KSO performed under 6 different guest conductors. Ultimately, Gregory Millar became the full-time resident conductor and music director. His tenure saw the introduction of many long-standing programs, including children's concerts, concerts in other locales in southwest Michigan, and the Art Center recitals by KSO musicians. The first of the popular "Starlight" summer concert series came in 1962; the concerts featured popular musicians like Louis Armstrong and were held on the roof of the Gilmore parking garage in downtown Kalamazoo. Millar's tenure was succeeded by Pierre Hetu in 1968 and Yoshimi Takeda in 1974. Maestro Takeda's 25-year tenure as music director and conductor saw the KSO establish its high level of musicality.

Raymond Harvey, was appointed music director in 1999.

In 2018, Julian Kuerti became the music director of the Kalamazoo Symphony Orchestra.

== See also ==
- Miller Auditorium
- Chenery Auditorium
