= Charles Stuart Pratt =

American writer of children's literature

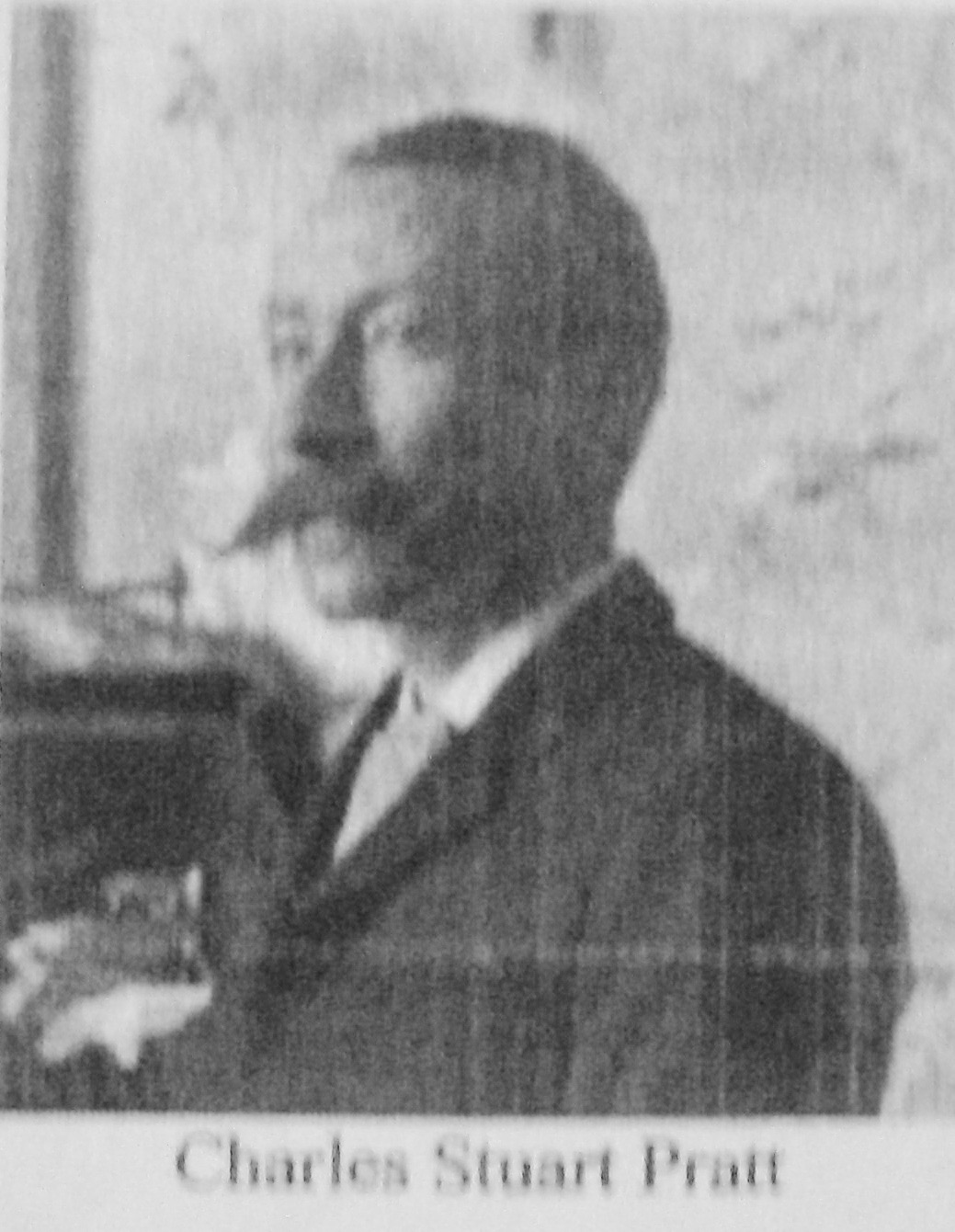
- Born: February 10, 1854; South Weymouth, Massachusetts, United States
- Died: April 3, 1921 (aged 67); Warner, New Hampshire, United States
- Education: South Weymouth High School
- Occupations: Editor, Writer
- Spouse: Ella Farman Pratt (m. 1877)
- Children: 1

Charles Stuart Pratt (1854–1921), who sometimes wrote under the pen names of C. P. Stewart and C. P. Stuart, was an American writer of children's literature, best known for being the art editor of Wide Awake magazine for 16 years, starting in 1875. He edited children's magazines for 30 years, and for most of that time he worked with his wife, Ella Farman Pratt.

== Early life ==
Pratt was born on February 10, 1854, in South Weymouth, Massachusetts. He was the son of Loring and Laura (Vining) Pratt. Pratt attended South Weymouth High School, and then a Boston art school.

== Literary career ==
In 1875, when Pratt was 21 years old, he became the art editor of Wide Awake, a children's magazine published by D. Lothrop Company in Boston. Ella Farman was the magazine's literary editor. Pratt and Farman wed in 1877.

As art editor Pratt hired many well-known illustrators, including William Parker Bodfish and Frederick Childe Hassam. He also wrote numerous stories for the magazine, which were published anonymously or under a pen name. He edited Wide Awake from 1875 until 1891.

Pratt and his wife also worked on other D. Lothrop Company children's magazines. They edited Babyland from 1877 to 1892 and then from 1894 to 1897. In addition, they edited Little Men and Women for an unknown period of time.

From 1897 until 1909 Pratt edited Little Folks, a children's magazine published by S. E. Cassino Company, in Salem, Massachusetts. Ella Farman Pratt was co-editor until shortly before her death in 1907. Until at least 1912 the Little Folks Contents page stated, “Edited from foundation to May, 1909, by Charles S. and Ella Farman Pratt.”

During Pratt's time as a children's magazine editor, he was also writing stories for adult magazines. He won a one-thousand-dollar prize for his story A Celestial Crime, which was published in the December 1897 issue of The Black Cat, another S. E. Cassino Company publication. His story Napoleon and the Regent Diamond was published in the September 1895 issue of Lippincott’s Monthly Magazine. The story was considered so noteworthy that it was mentioned in an 1895 issue of the Review of Reviews.

== Personal life ==
Charles Stuart Pratt wed Eliza Anna (Ella) Farman on November 11, 1877. For most of their married life the couple lived in Warner, New Hampshire. Pratt had a son, Ralph Farman Pratt, born July 7, 1878, who became a landscape painter.

For many years Pratt was on the board of trustees of the Pillsbury Free Library and worked to have branch libraries for school children in Davisville and Melvin's Mills, which are villages included within the boundaries of Warner, New Hampshire.

== Later life ==
in 1909 Pratt stepped down as editor of Little Folks due to serious health problems. The obituary published in his hometown newspaper states that he suffered a “paralytic shock,” which caused a lingering illness, but that he “bore his severe burden with fortitude.”

For many years he got by on his savings, but the September 1920 issue of The Writer contained this brief notice: “The Boston Transcript publishes an appeal for financial aid for Charles Stuart Pratt of Warner N. H., who with Mrs. Ella Farman Pratt formerly edited the magazine, Wide Awake, and who is now poor and helpless with paralysis in his old age.”

Pratt died in Warner, New Hampshire, on April 3, 1921. He was buried in South Weymouth, Massachusetts.

== Published books ==
- 1886 - Bye-O-Baby Ballads, D. Lothrop
- 1888 - Baby’s Lullaby Book, Prang & Company
- 1896 - Little Peterkin Vandike, L.C. Page & Company
- 1896 - The Brown Bunny, (pen name of C.P. Stewart), S.E. Cassino Company
- 1899 - Stick-and-Pea Plays, D. Lothrop
- 1899 - Buz-Buz & His Twelve Adventures, D. Lothrop
- 1905 - Riddle-Rhymes, S.E. Cassino Company
- 1908 - Little Noah’s Ark, (pen name of C.P. Stuart), S.E. Cassino Company
