= Kalamazoo Central High School =

High school in Kalamazoo County, Michigan, USA

Location
- 2432 North Drake Road; Kalamazoo, Michigan 49009; United States; 42°18′57″N 85°38′49″W

Information
- School type: Public high school secondary school
- Founded: 1858
- School district: Kalamazoo Public Schools
- Principal: Valerie Boggan
- Teaching staff: 73.75 (on a FTE basis)
- Grades: 9–12
- Gender: Co-educational
- Enrollment: 1,651 (2023–2024)
- Student to teacher ratio: 22.39
- Colors: Maroon and white
- Athletics conference: Southwestern Michigan Athletic Conference
- Nickname: Maroon Giants
- Website: central.kalamazoopublicschools.com

Student assessments
- 2021–22 school year Change vs. prior year

M-STEP 11th grade proficiency rates (Science / Social Studies)
- Advanced %: 16.0 / 12.5
- Proficient %: 21.9 / 22.2
- PR. Proficient %: 10.8 / 45.8
- Not Proficient %: 51.4 / 19.4

Average test scores
- SAT Total: 935.3 (▼ −120.1)

Kalamazoo Central High School is a four-year public high school in Kalamazoo, Michigan serving students from ninth through twelfth grades. It was the first public high school in Michigan. It began operating in 1858 and graduated its first class of five men and three women in 1859. It moved to its current location in 1972. It is rated Class A by the Michigan High School Athletic Association (MHSAA). On May 4, 2010, the White House announced that Central High had won the first annual Race to the Top High School Commencement Challenge and that President Barack Obama would deliver the school’s 2010 commencement address.

Kalamazoo Central students are eligible for the Kalamazoo Promise, which provides reduced or free college tuition for students attending public colleges in Michigan.

== History ==
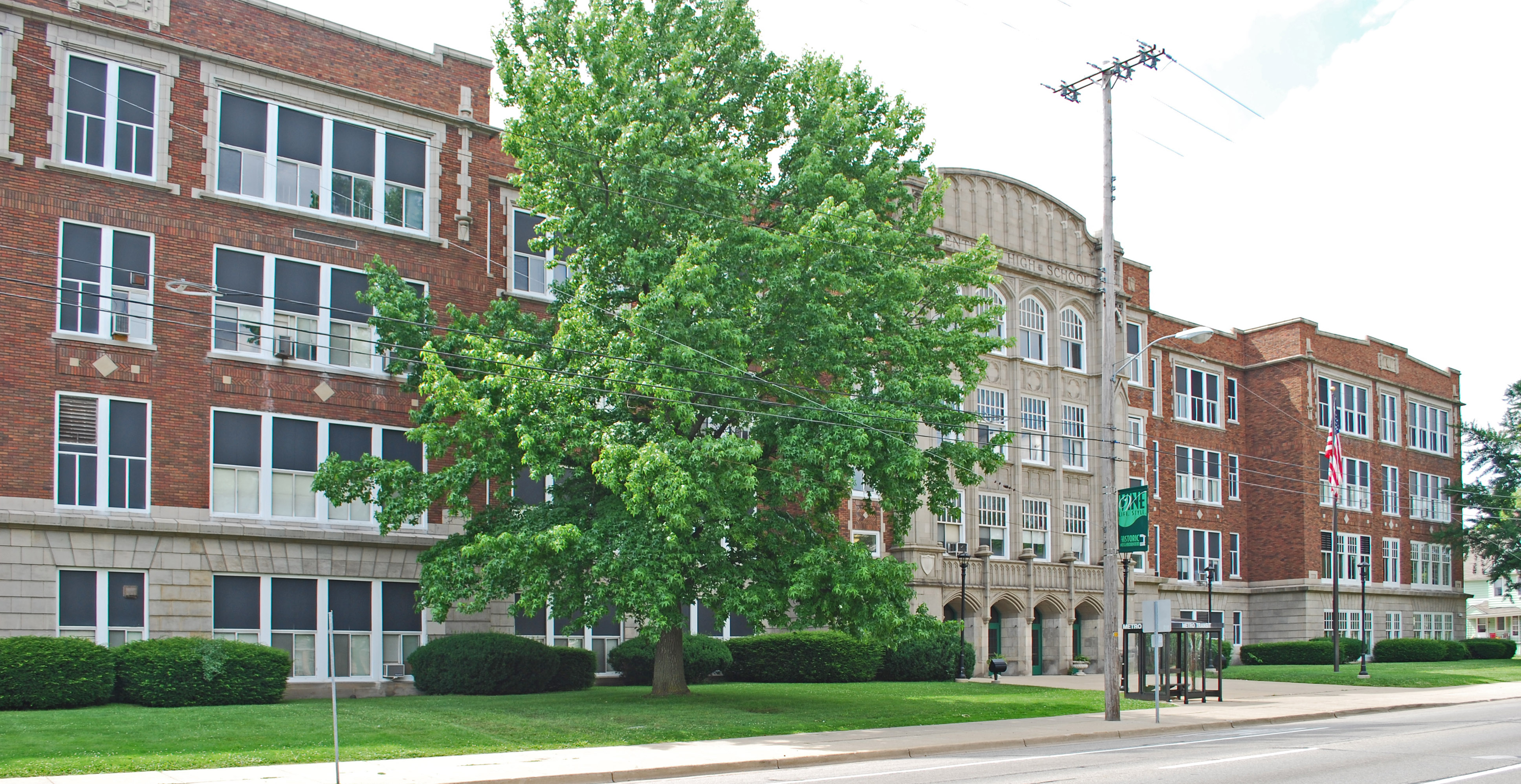
Old Central High School, 714 S. Westnedge

The first legal public high-school in Kalamazoo and in the state of Michigan began operating in 1858. The first class, consisting of five men and three women graduated in 1859. Charles E. Stuart sued the Kalamazoo School Board in 1874 alleging that the school-board's use of taxpayer money to fund secondary education was unconstitutional (up until that point taxpayers money was only for elementary schools). The School Board prevailed, setting a precedent allowing publicly funded secondary education throughout the country.

In 1925 the school moved to the building currently known as Old Central High School at 714 South Westnedge. Old Central High School currently houses the Kalamazoo Area Mathematics and Science Center, or KAMSC. Following the largest graduating class of 799 students in 1960, some Central High School students transferred to the newly opened Loy Norrix High School in 1961. Central High School moved to its current location in 1972.

After the introduction of the Kalamazoo Promise scholarship program, the school along with the Kalamazoo Public Schools system was placed into the national spotlight highlighted with a Katie Couric visit. Enrollment in KPS has risen significantly, and the surrounding area has begun to find economic benefits.

Buddy Holly and the Crickets played a show in the Old Central High School Auditorium on April 28, 1958.

== Demographics ==
The demographic breakdown of the 1,595 students enrolled in 2013-14 was:

- Male - 48.7%
- Female - 51.3%
- Native American/Alaskan - 0.6%
- Asian/Pacific islanders - 2.4%
- Black - 49.1%
- Hispanic - 8.7%
- White - 33.7%
- Multiracial - 5.5%

64.6% of the students were eligible for free or reduced lunch.

== Student activities ==
The Choir program competes in the MSVMA (Michigan State Vocal Music Association).

The Mock Trial team took first place at Nationals in 1996.

== Athletics ==
Kalamazoo Central's Maroon Giants compete in the Southwestern Michigan Athletic Conference. The school colors are maroon and white. The following MHSAA sanctioned sports are offered:

- Bowling (boys & girls)
- Football (boys)
- Baseball (boys)
- Basketball (boys & girls)
  - Boys state champion - 1932, 1938, 1949, 1950, 1951, 2010, 2011
- Competitive Cheer (girls)
- Softball (girls)
- Soccer (boys & girls)
- Track (boys & girls)
  - Boys state champion - 1933, 1942, 1965, 2024
- Tennis (boys & girls)
  - Boys state champion - 1937
  - Girls state champion - 1972
- Wrestling (boys)
- Swimming and Diving (boys & girls)
- Lacrosse (boys & girls) **
- Ice hockey (boys) **
- Volleyball (girls)
  - State champion - 1996
- Golf (boys & girls)
  - Boys state champion - 1939, 1940
  - Girls state champion - 1994, 1995, 1996
- Cross-Country (boys & girls)
  - Boys state champion - 1925, 1926, 1927, 1928, 1930(tied), 1931, 1935, 1943, 1946, 1950, 1954
- Skiing (boys & girls)

**Kalamazoo United teams with Loy Norrix High School

== Notable alumni ==
- Neil Berry, former MLB player (Detroit Tigers, St. Louis Browns, Chicago White Sox, Baltimore Orioles)
- Don Boven, NBA basketball player
- Jerome Harrison, former NFL running back (Cleveland Browns, Philadelphia Eagles, Detroit Lions)
- Ron Jackson, former MLB player (Chicago White Sox, Boston Red Sox)
- Greg Jennings, former NFL wide receiver (Green Bay Packers, Miami Dolphins, Minnesota Vikings) football player, Super Bowl champion
- Derek Jeter (1992), Captain of the New York Yankees (2003–2014), five-time World Series champion and fourteen time All-Star, member High School Athletic Hall of Fame
- Jordan Klepper, comedian
- Danny Lewis (born 1970), American-English basketball player
- Isaiah Livers, NBA player for the Detroit Pistons
- James McDivitt (1947), NASA astronaut
- Charles A. Pratt (1928), first Black judge in Kalamazoo County
- Scott Rehberg (1992), former NFL player (New England Patriots, Cleveland Browns, and Cincinnati Bengals)
- Mike Squires, Major League Baseball player
- Frederick S. Strong, US Army major general
- Kurt Thoroughman, professor of biomedical engineering at Washington University in St. Louis
- Dorothy B. Waage, numismatist
- Duane Young, San Diego Chargers football player

== See also ==
- Kalamazoo Public Schools
