= Vine Area Historic District =

- U.S. National Register of Historic Places
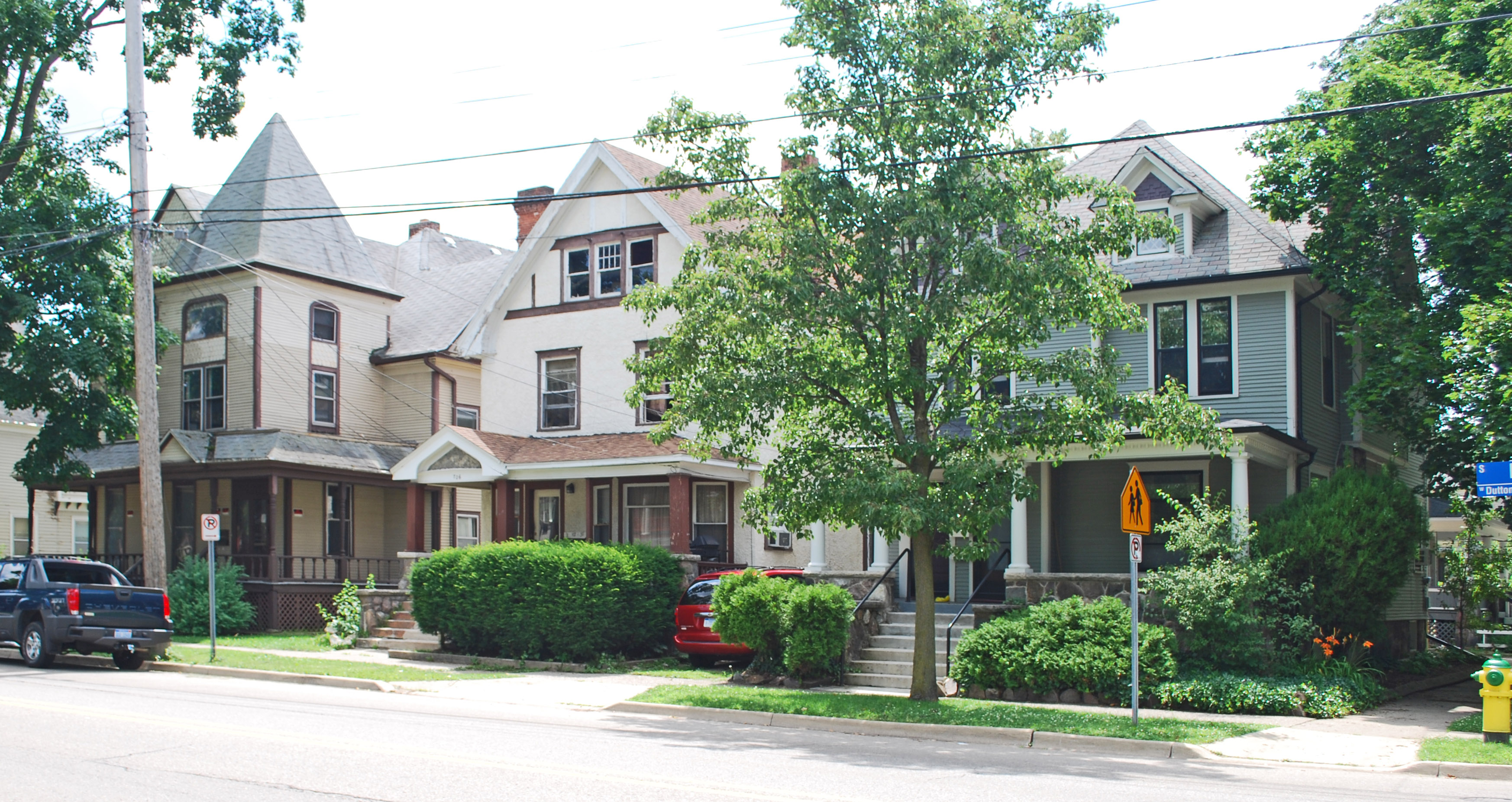

- Location within Michigan Location within the United States
- Interactive map
- Location: Roughly bounded by S. Rose, S. Westnedge, W. Walnut, and Ranney Sts., Kalamazoo, Michigan
- Coordinates: 42°17′05″N 85°35′12″W
- Area: 33.3 acres (13.5 ha)
- Architectural style: Late Victorian, Greek Revival, Italianate
- MPS: Kalamazoo MRA
- NRHP reference No.: 83000875
- Added to NRHP: August 16, 1983

The Vine Area Historic District is a primarily residential historic district, roughly bounded by South Rose, South Westnedge, West Walnut, and Ranney Streets in Kalamazoo, Michigan. It was listed on the National Register of Historic Places in 1983.

== History ==
In the 1840s, what is now the Vine Area Historic District was part of a large farm owned by Michigan governor Epaphroditus Ransom. Ransom sold this tract of land to Paulus DenBleyker, a recently arrived Dutch immigrant, in the early 1850s. DenBleyker platted the land into streets and lots, many of which he sold to his fellow Dutch immigrants. In the 1860s and 70s, the neighborhood became the home of middle-class merchants and professionals. It remained thinly settled until the 1880s, when a street railway line was built into the area. Development jumped in the late 1880s, 1890s, and early 1900s, and by 1920 the neighborhood was essentially built out.

Significant early residents of the neighborhood include pioneer druggist James P. Clapham, furniture dealer Edwin A. Carder, brickmaker R. Dexter Walker, and lawyer and politician William M. Stearns. In later years, many of the houses were turned into rental units or split into apartments.

== Description ==
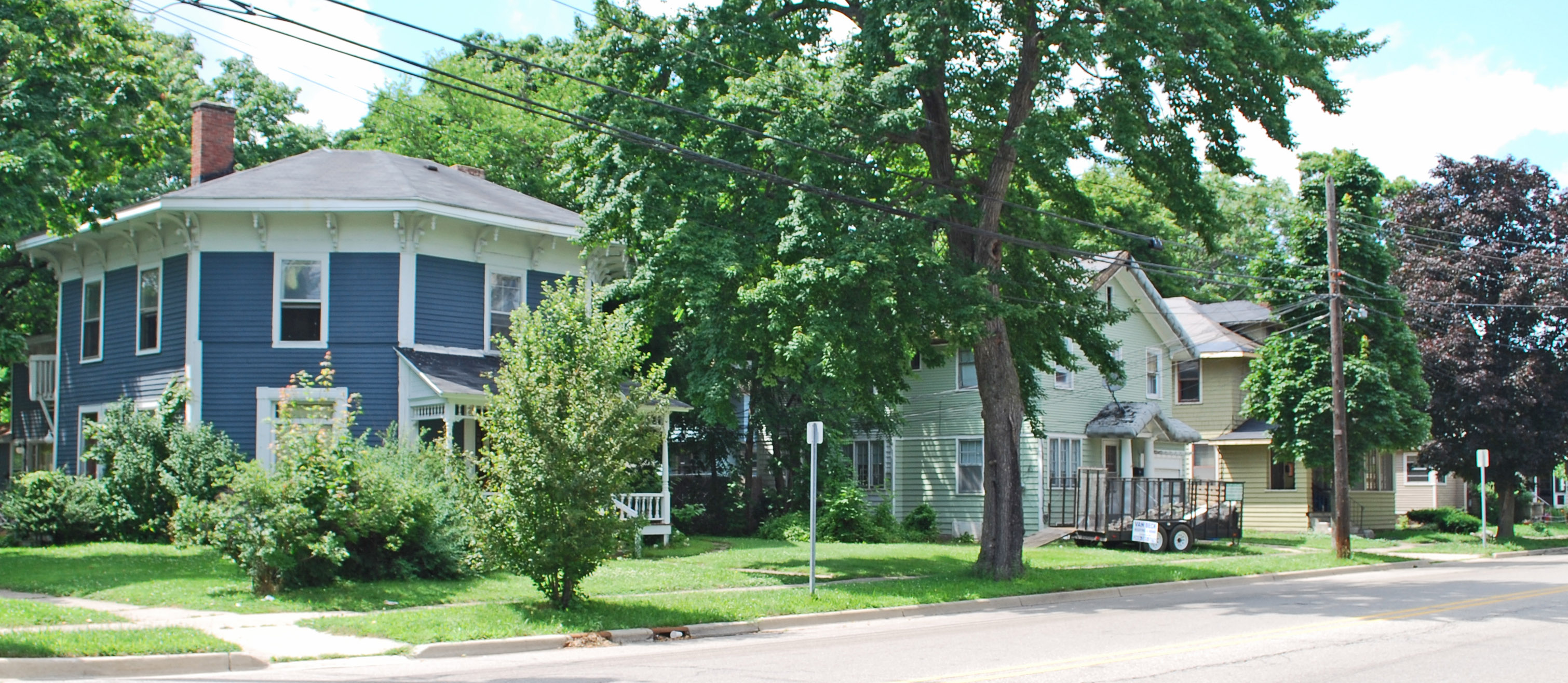
The west side of Rose Street

The Vine Area Historic District contains 175 structures, covering six or seven square blocks of tree-lined streets. The great majority of the structures are single-family homes, with only five non-residential structures, including the Grace Christian Reformed Church and the large, Neo-Tudor-style Old Central High School. The district contains a high concentration of Greek Revival, Italianate, Queen Anne, and Colonial Revival houses.
