= Nelly Littlehale Umbstaetter Murphy =

American artist (1867–1941)

Nelly Littlehale Murphy
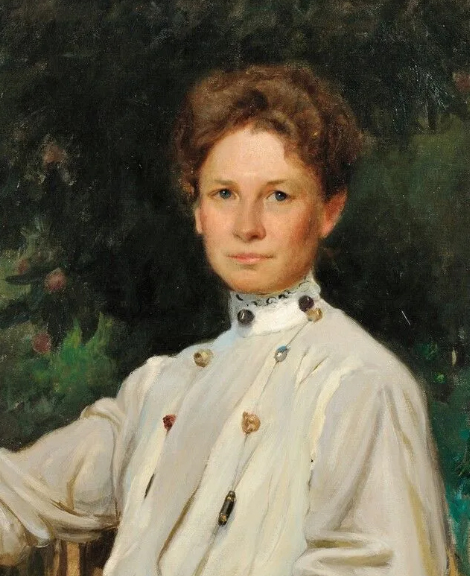
- Born: 1867; Stockton, California
- Died: 1941 (aged 73–74); Lexington, Massachusetts
- Known for: Painting, illustration

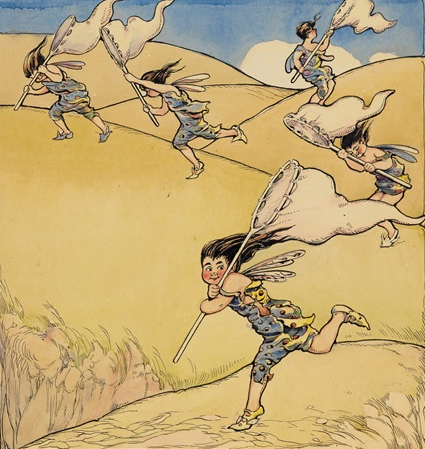
The Wind Gatherers

Nelly Littlehale Umbstaetter Murphy (1867–1941) was an American artist. She was born in Stockton, California, and moved to Boston when she married her first husband, Herman Umbstaetter. She drew many of the covers for The Black Cat, the magazine her husband edited from 1895 to 1912, and a collection of the covers was advertised as a free gift with subscriptions to the magazine in 1905. She studied with Joseph De Camp and Charles Howard Walker. Her first husband died in 1913, and she married Hermann Dudley Murphy in 1916. She died in 1941 in Lexington, Massachusetts. Her work is in the collection of the Addison Gallery of American Art and the Museum of Fine Arts, Boston. She was a member of the American Watercolor Society, the Copley Society of Art , and The Guild of Boston Artists. Her papers are in the Archives of American Art.

== List of exhibitions ==
Her exhibitions included the following:

- Boston City Club: 1916
- Guild of Boston Artists: 1926 (solo) and 1937
- Macbeth Gallery, New York: 1929 (solo)
- Boston Art Club: 1929

== Sources ==
- Anonymous (October 1905). "Something New!". The Black Cat. Vol. 11, no. 1. pp. vi–vii.
- Bessom, Harold E. (October 1920). "The Story of The Black Cat". The Black Cat. Vol. 25, no. 12. pp. 84–92.
