= Little Folks =

American children's magazine

Little Folks Magazine
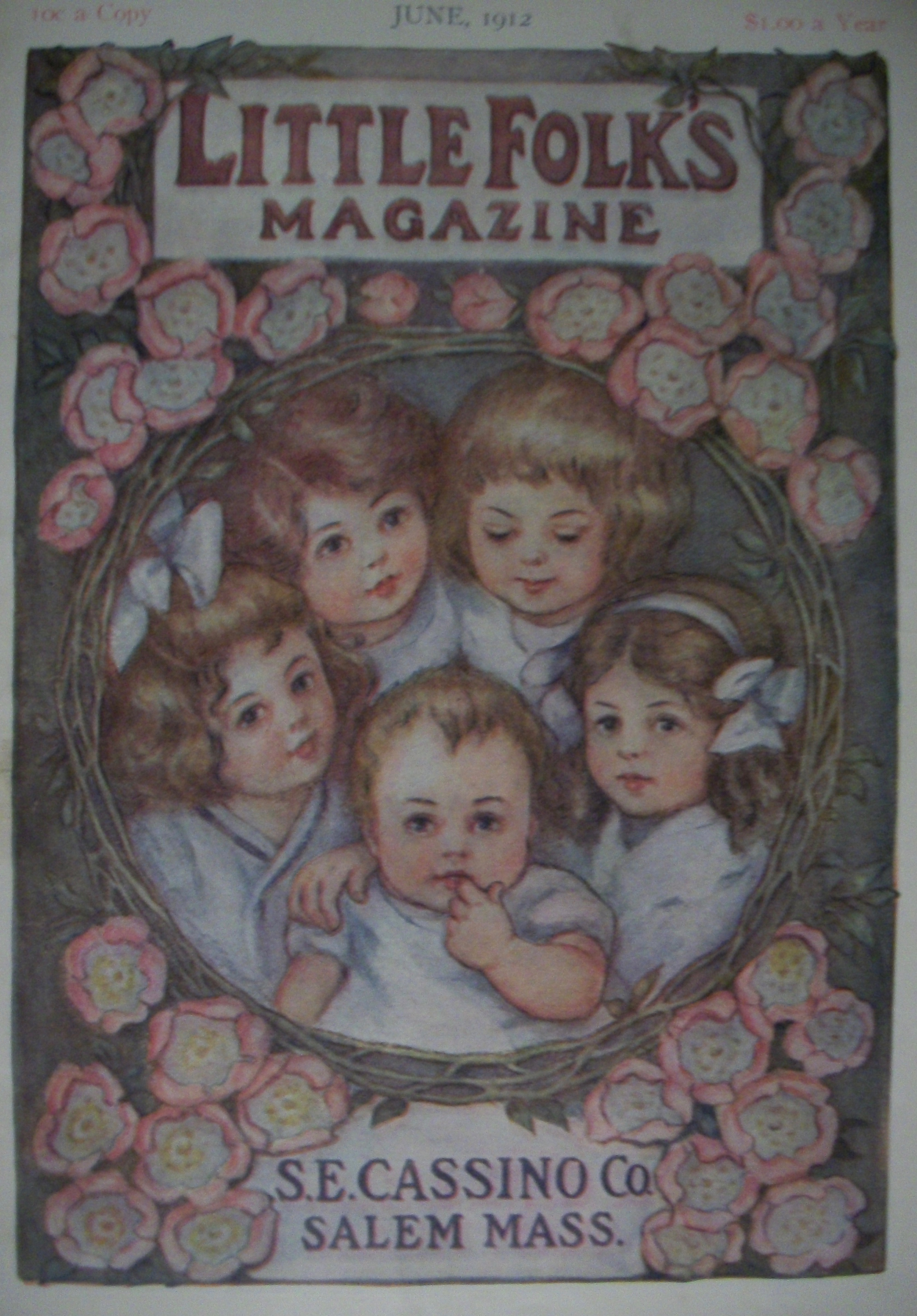
- June 1912 cover
- Editor: Ella Farman Pratt, Charles Stuart Pratt, Margheritta Osborn Osborne
- Categories: Children’s magazine
- Frequency: Monthly
- Publisher: S. E. Cassino
- First issue: 1897; 129 years ago
- Final issue: 1926
- Country: United States

Little Folks was a monthly United States children's magazine for young readers from three to twelve years-old. It was founded by publisher Samuel E. Cassino, and was published between November 1897 and 1926 – originally in Boston, but was later relocated to Salem, Massachusetts.

== Editors ==
Ella Farman Pratt was co-editor from 1897 until shortly before her death in 1907. From 1897 until 1909 Charles Stuart Pratt was co-editor, and then editor, of Little Folks, until illness prevented him from working. Until at least 1912 the Little Folks Contents page stated "Edited from foundation to May, 1909, by Charles S. and Ella Farman Pratt." The Pratts had previously edited the children's magazine Wide Awake from 1875 to 1891.

The final editor was Margheritta Osborn Osborne, daughter of publisher Samuel E. Cassino. She had edited Everyday Housekeeping from 1908 to 1910.

== Format ==
Little Folks averaged 46 one-column pages, with advertising sections at the front and back of each issue. No advertising appeared amongst the stories. Every volume began in November, and all successive issues of a volume continued numbering pages where the last issue ended its numbering. For example, if the May issue ended with page 238, the June issue began with page 239. For many years the magazine subscription price was one dollar a year, but over time the price increased to two dollars a year.

== Content ==
The magazine was well-illustrated with drawings and photographs. Each issue contained short stories, articles, poems, and serialized stories. Readers' letters about their charitable endeavors were printed on a page originally called Lend-a-Hand Society, and then changed to Little Folks Helping Hand Society. A feature entitled Play Department gave instructions for making simple paper or cardboard toys and crafts.

A regular feature was a two-page picture story for the youngest readers. Each story contained dozens of small illustrations that were used in place of a printed word.

In 1915 advertisements were placed in newspapers offering new subscribers six issues of Little Folks, plus a wren house, for forty cents. The ads stated the magazine contained "fairy stories, nature stories, stories of real children, stories of make-believe children, new games to play, colored cut outs, and pictures to color with paints or crayons."

Starting in 1920 Little Folks was subtitled Something to Do for Boys and Girls. New features were added including instructions for items to make, book reviews, nature study and animal stories.

== Other Little Folks periodicals ==
- Little Folks was a British children's magazine published by Cassell in London, England. It was published from 1871 to 1933.
- Edward Eggleston published an eight-page Sunday School paper entitled Little Folks, which was distributed monthly, and was published from 1869 to 1877.
