= Charles A. Pratt =

American judge (1909–1989)

Judge of the 8th District Court
- In office 1968–1980

Personal details
- Born: April 2, 1909; Kalamazoo, Michigan, U.S.
- Died: March 21, 1989 (aged 79)
- Resting place: Fort Custer National Cemetery
- Education: Howard University (BA); Howard University (JD)

Charles A. Pratt (April 2, 1909 – March 21, 1989) was an American judge. He was the first Black judge in Kalamazoo County, Michigan, first elected in 1968 to the newly created 8th District Court.

== Early life and education ==
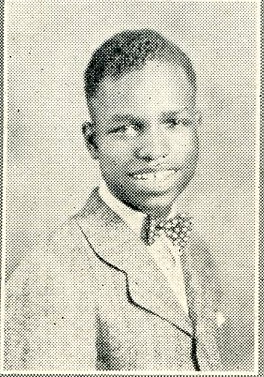
Pratt's Kalamazoo Central High School yearbook photo, 1928

Pratt was born on April 2, 1909, to Otis and Lydia Pratt in Kalamazoo, Michigan. He attended Kalamazoo Central High School and graduated in 1928. Pratt attended Howard University where he earned a Bachelor of Arts degree in 1932 and his Doctor of Jurisprudence in 1935. He was awarded an honorary Doctor of Laws degree from Kalamazoo College.

== Career ==
=== Private practice ===
Pratt opened a law practice in Kalamazoo after failing to join a larger firm. He recounted in a speech: "One lawyer told me that now the colored people had a lawyer of their own. I told him that I was not a lawyer for the colored people, but for all the people. That I was a Negro but did not want to be restricted because of that fact."

He practiced law as an attorney from 1935 to 1968, except for the five years he served during World War II.

=== Military service ===
During World War II, Pratt was called to active duty as a member of the Judge Advocate General's Corps of the U.S. Army. He also served in the army's 366th Infantry Regiment that fought in North Africa and Italy.

=== 8th District Court Judge ===
In 1968, Pratt became the first black judge elected in Kalamazoo County. He retired from the bench in 1980 due to a state law restricting the age of judges.

=== Board memberships ===
He served on several local boards.

- Douglass Community Association
- Kalamazoo YMCA
- Kalamazoo County Bar Association
- County Legal Aid Bureau
- Kalamazoo Child Guidance Clinic
- Council of Social Agencies
- Kalamazoo N.A.A.C.P.
- Kalamazoo Lions Club
- Kalamazoo Torch Club
- Kalamazoo Visiting Nurse Association
- Youth Opportunities Unlimited
- Senior Service, Inc
- Citizens Association of Kalamazoo State Hospital
- The Family Service Center
- Goodwill Industries
- Advisory Board of WMUK
- Community Services Council
- Greater Kalamazoo United Way
- Council of Human Relations
- Kalamazoo Valley Community College Foundation Board

== Personal life and death ==
Pratt married Thema Lenox, they had four children Charles Pratt Jr., Helen Mickens, James Pratt, and Sonya Terburg.

Pratt died in 1989 and was buried at Fort Custer National Cemetery in Kalamazoo.

== Legacy ==
In October 2010, a group of African-American judges and lawyers from Kalamazoo and Calhoun County, Michigan voted to establish the Charles A. Pratt Bar Association, first minority bar association in their counties. The association focuses on providing legal education in the Kalamazoo community and resources for attorneys of color.

In September 2023, members of the Kalamazoo County Bar Association petitioned the Kalamazoo County Board of Commissioners to rename an incoming justice center in downtown Kalamazoo in honor of Pratt. The board voted to approve the renaming of the building to the "Judge Charles A. Pratt Justice Center" in October. The building opened on December 11, 2023, replacing the Michigan Avenue Courthouse constructed in 1937.
