= Wide Awake (magazine) =

19th century American children's magazine

Wide Awake Magazine
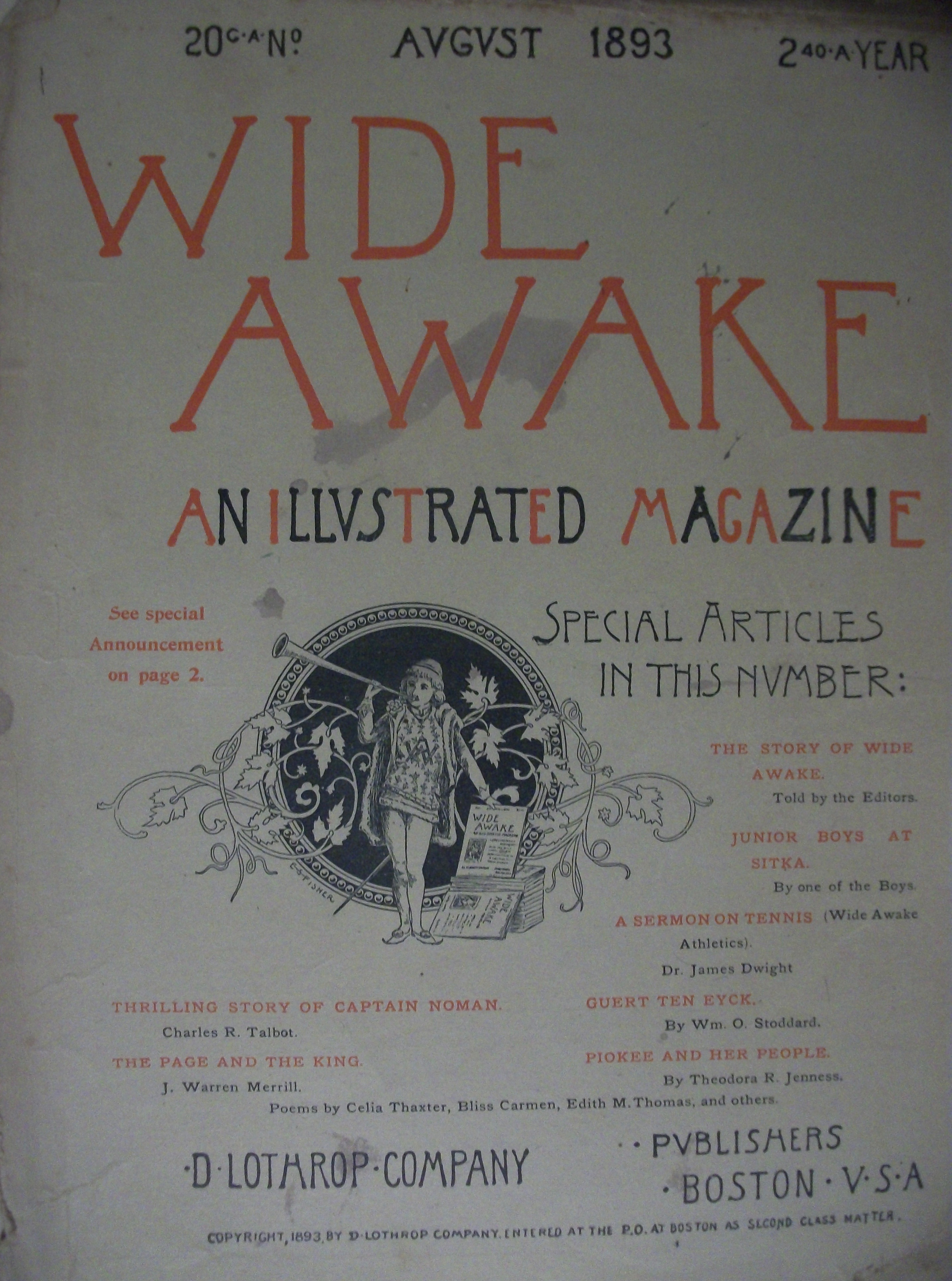
- August 1893 cover
- Editor: Ella Farman Pratt, Charles Stuart Pratt, Elbridge Streeter Brooks
- Categories: Children’s magazine
- Frequency: Monthly
- Publisher: D. Lothrop Company
- First issue: July 1875
- Final issue: August 1893
- Country: United States

Wide Awake was a monthly American children's magazine, founded in 1875 by Daniel Lothrop. It published stories written by Margaret Sidney, Edward Everett Hale, Sarah Orne Jewett, Elizabeth Stuart Phelps Ward, and Mary Eleanor Wilkins Freeman. Wide Awake was illustrated by many well known artists including Howard Pyle, William Thomas Smedley, Sol Eytinge Jr. and Frank T. Merrill. The magazine was based in Boston.

Wide Awake merged with St. Nicholas Magazine in 1893.

== Founding ==
Daniel Lothrop, founder of the Boston publishing firm of D. Lothrop Company, started Wide Awake, intended for a readership of children between ten and eighteen years of age. Lothrop was a publisher with an evangelical viewpoint. He wanted a magazine that "shall help to make the boys and girls of America broad-minded, pure-hearted, and thoroughly wide awake."

The first issue was dated July, 1875 and in it readers were informed "Magazines like Wide Awake are good for young folks, and contain nothing of the 'run-away-to-sea' style for boys, or the 'elope-and-be-happy' incentive for girls, which are greatly cried against by parents now-a-days."

== Editors ==
Ella Farman, author of several children's books published by Lothrop, was chosen as the magazine's first editor. For several months she edited Wide Awake from her home in Battle Creek, Michigan with the assistance of her friend Emma L. Shaw, before Farman and Shaw moved to Boston. Charles Stuart Pratt was the art editor. Farman and Pratt married in 1877, and Shaw returned to Michigan soon after the wedding. Ella Farman Pratt remained as editor until December, 1891.

Wide Awake's final editor was Elbridge Streeter Brooks, who had been an associate editor at St. Nicholas Magazine from 1884 through 1887. He was a prolific writer of more than thirty non-fiction children's books.

== Contents ==
Early issues contained between 60 and 72 pages of well-illustrated short stories, articles, poems, and serialized stories. There were word puzzles on a page entitled Tangles. Readers' letters about their homes and families were printed in a section called Wide Awake Post Office. Wide Awake Athletics told children about playing team sports and exercising at a gymnasium.

Later issues had an average of 92 pages, not counting advertising pages. No advertising appeared amongst the magazine's stories, it was all within special sections at the front and back of the issues, as well as on the inside front cover, and on the back cover.

Wide Awake never built its circulation above 25,000 subscribers, but its reach extended beyond those who received it monthly through the mail. Twice a year six issues (minus covers and advertising pages) were bound into attractive hard covers and marketed as gifts books. For many years these volumes were titled Wide Awake Pleasure Book.

Serialized stories were planned so that they began in the first of the bound issues, and ended in the last one. Some of the serialized stories were later published as novels by D. Lothrop Company.

From the 1880s until 1893 cost of Wide Awake was 20 cents per issue and $2.40 per year. The cost of a hardcover six issue Wide Awake Pleasure Book was $1.50

== Five Little Peppers ==
The most popular of the Wide Awake serialized stories were ones that told of the Five Little Peppers. They were written by Harriet Mulford Stone, under her pen name of Margaret Sidney.

In 1877 Miss Stone's first published story, Polly Pepper's Chicken Pie, appeared in Wide Awake. Phronsie Pepper's New Shoes was published in 1878. Due to positive reader response editor Ella Farman Pratt asked Stone to write a series of stories about the Pepper family. The new stories were published in the 1880 issues of the magazine.

Publisher Daniel Lothrop enjoyed reading the Pepper stories and wondered what the author was like. He had to go to New York on business and decided to stop in New Haven and call on Miss Stone. For a time Lothrop made biweekly trips to call upon the author, and in 1881 Lothrop and Stone were married. During that same year D. Lothrop Company published an expanded version of the serialized stories as the novel Five Little Peppers and How They Grew.

Until the demise of Wide Awake all of the Five Little Peppers novels were first serialized in the magazine, and later published in book form by D. Lothrop Company.

== Chautauqua Young Folks Reading Union ==
Daniel Lothrop had an interest in the Chautauqua Institution, which started as a summer school for Sunday School teachers, and expanded to include educational lectures and courses in self-improvement. In 1882 Wide Awake began adding a 16-page Chautauqua Young Folks' Reading Union (CYFRU) Supplement to each issue. All of the books listed in the supplement's reading course were published by D. Lothrop Company.

The CYFRU supplements were not included in the bound volumes marketed as Wide Awake Pleasure Books, and they were discontinued in 1888.

== Merger With St. Nicholas Magazine ==
On March 18, 1892, Daniel Lothrop died unexpectedly, and for a time his widow set aside her writing career and took on the responsibilities of being a book and magazine publisher. She experienced financial difficulties and none of the Lothrop magazines lasted long after Mr. Lothrop's death.

The final Wide Awake issue was dated August, 1893. It was 144 pages long and contained all remaining chapters of the two stories that were being serialized. An article on the life of Daniel Lothrop stated that new lines of book publishing would be taken up, and thought and labor could not be diverted into publishing magazines. Readers were told:

"So, to make a long story short, with this August number Wide Awake ceases to be a separate publication. From this time it is merged into St. Nicholas, and becomes St. Nicholas. And every friend of Wide Awake who has been its loyal, devoted and steadfast supporter through all its years of life, is urged to still remain loyal, devoted and steadfast by following the dearly-loved magazine into its new home, and to love St. Nicholas just as strongly and just as dearly as Wide Awake has been loved."

A two-page announcement from St. Nicholas informed subscribers that they would receive St. Nicholas during the balance of their subscription.
