= Daniel Lothrop =

American publisher (1831–1892)

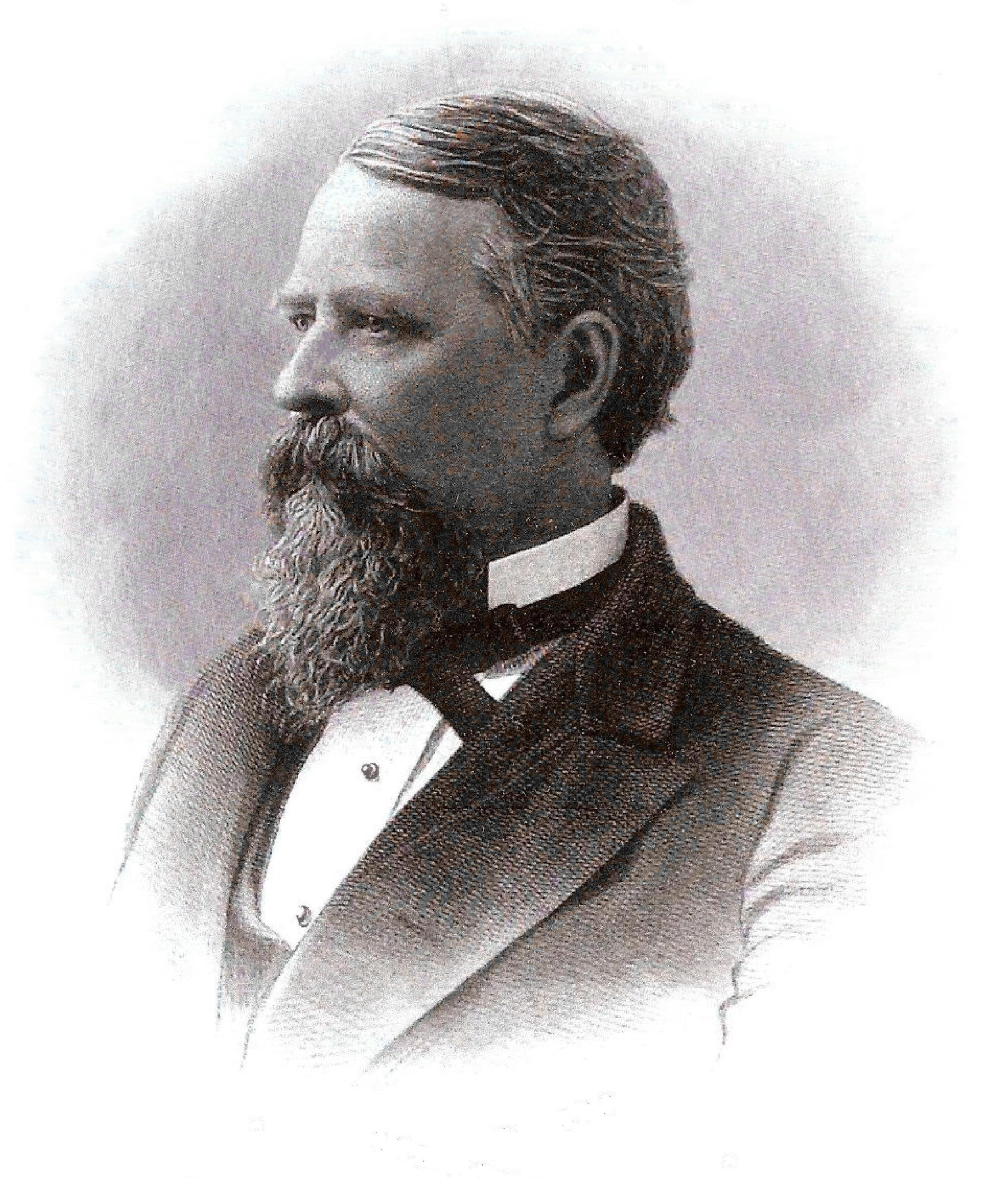
- Born: August 11, 1831; Rochester, New Hampshire, United States
- Died: March 18, 1892 (aged 60); Boston, Massachusetts
- Occupation: Publisher

Daniel Lothrop (August 11, 1831 – March 18, 1892) was an American publisher.

== Biography ==
Daniel Lothrop was born in Rochester, Strafford County, New Hampshire, August 11, 1831, son of Daniel and Sophia (Home) Lothrop, the youngest of three brothers. He was a lineal descendant of John Lowthorpe, who in the thirty-seventh year of Henry VIII (1545) was a gentleman of extensive landed estates, and of Mark Lothrop, his grandson. The latter settled in Salem, Massachusetts, in 1644, and his line joined that of Priscilla Mullens and John Alden of the Mayflower, Daniel Lothrop being in the seventh generation from them. On the maternal side he was a lineal descendant of William Home, of Home's Hill, Dover, New Hampshire, who held his exposed position through the Indian wars, but was killed in the Indian massacre of June 28, 1689. His estate was in the family name from 1662 to the 19th century.

=== Education and early business ventures ===
Daniel Lothrop was a diligent student; his aptitude for mathematics was remarkable, and he possessed a singularly retentive memory, so that at age 14 he was prepared for college. But waiting a year, at the advice of friends, who thought him too young to enter, circumstances thrust him into the arena of business, and he assumed the charge of a brother's drug store. His love of books soon led him to introduce the sale of them as an adjunct.

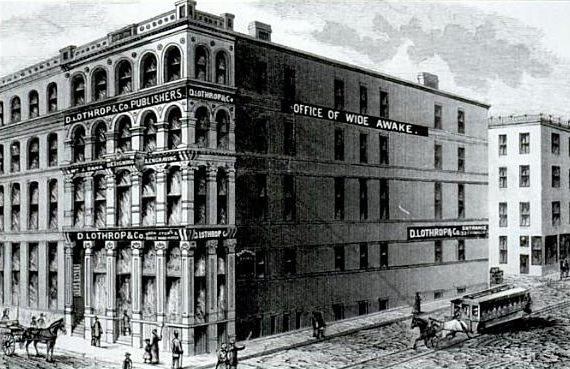
D. Lothrop & Co. building, Boston

At the age of 17, he hired and stocked a drug store in Newmarket, New Hampshire and, once it was operational, he called on a third brother to manage it while he established a similar store at Meredith Bridge, New Hampshire (now Laconia) (books being the principal stock). These three brothers remained for more than 40 years in a co partnership with absolute unity of interests, though in different lines of business, and located in different cities. In 1850, Lothrop bought out a book store in Dover, New Hampshire, which he made one of the best and largest in New England, and it became a literary center: A favorite meeting place for the cultivated people of the town.

=== Publishing ===
By 1868, Lothrop was ready to concentrate his forces upon the broader accomplishment of his life purpose of publishing literature for the people, and especially for children and youth. He then transferred his publishing work to Boston, with headquarters at 38 and 40 Cornhill.

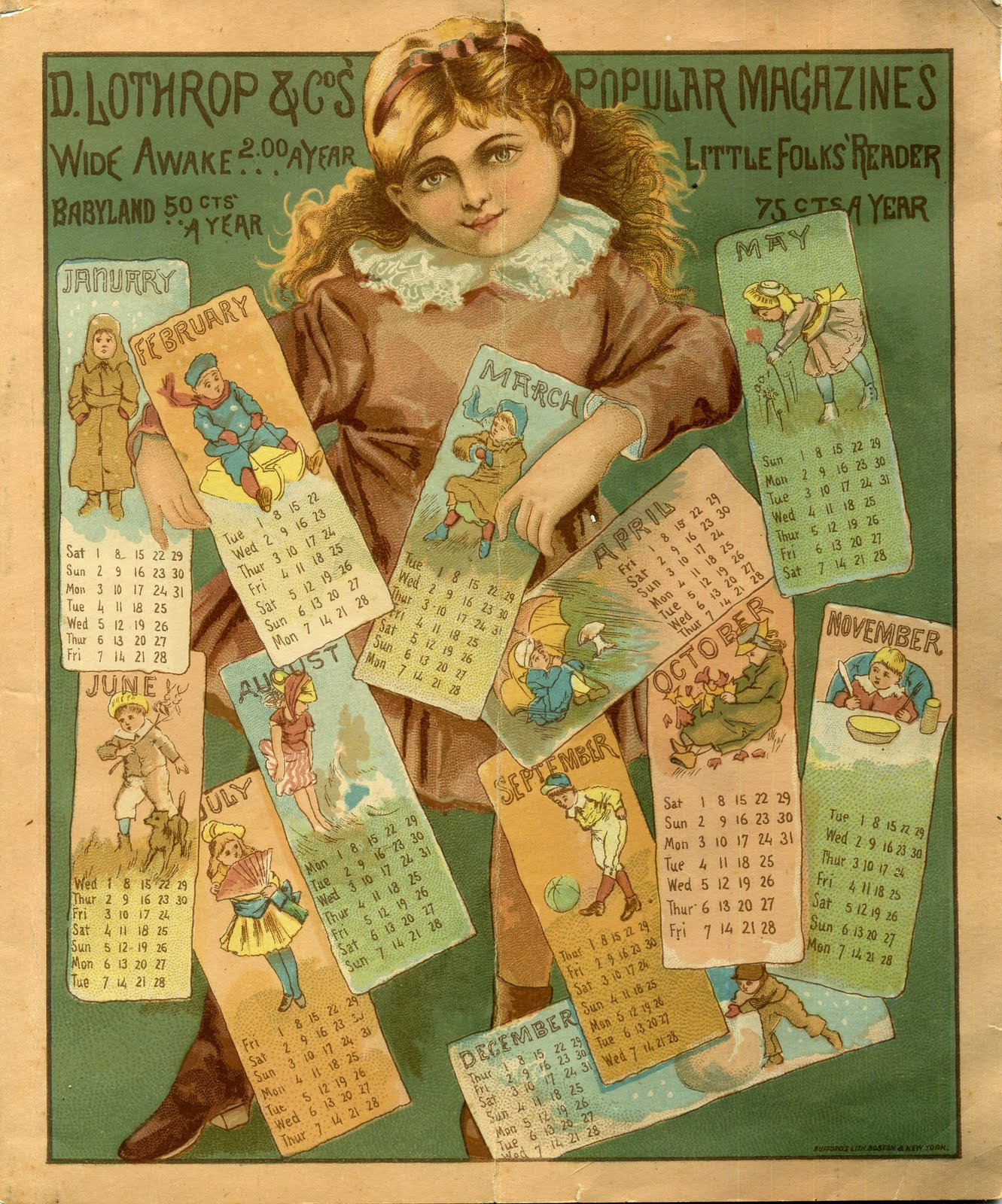
Poster of Lothrop children's publications 1881

He published children's books and Sunday-school literature, and was later referred to as the "children's friend". He stated that his publishing aim was to avoid works he considered purely sensational and to publish books intended to encourage moral conduct.

=== Children's publications ===
Increased business compelled him to seek more spacious quarters, and in 1875 he moved to the large block on the corner of Franklin and Hawley streets. Again, to acquire more space, he moved in 1887 to 364 and 366 Washington Street, opposite Bromfield Street, using large warehouses on Purchase Street for the manufacture and storing of his books. His sales rooms and warehouses were among the most extensive in the trade. In 1875 he originated Wide Awake, a magazine for young people and the family. The Pansy, Our Little Men and Women, Babyland, the Chautauqua Young Folks' Journal and the quarterly Best Things, were other periodicals issued by his firm, and all were eminently successful.

=== Civic activity ===
Lothrop's American instincts and principles were so strong, that he worked for a long period of years toward the better development of citizenship; and soon after 1880 projected plans for the consummation of this work; and was at pains to spend a good deal of time in consultation with leading citizens in congress and elsewhere, in order to devise the best means by which an interest in citizenship might be awakened and extended. The result of his effort was the organization of the American Institute of Civics.

=== Family life ===
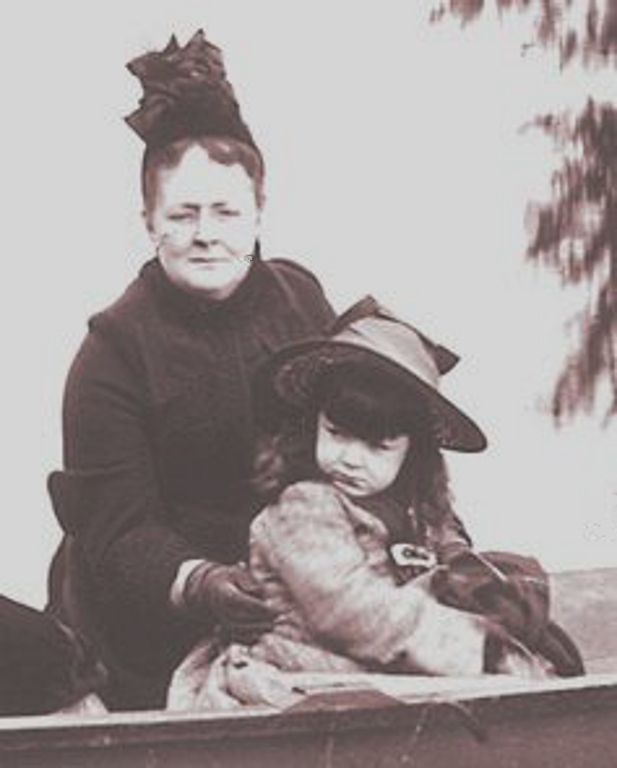
Harriett and Margaret c. 1890

On July 25, 1860, Lothrop was married to Ellen J. Morill of Dover, New Hampshire, daughter of Joseph and Nancy, before her death in March 1880.

On October 4, 1881, he married his second wife, Harriet Mulford Stone, the daughter of architect Sidney Mason Stone. Their daughter Margaret Mulford Lothrop, was born July 27, 1884 and their winters were spent in Boston and summers at "The Wayside", Concord, Massachusetts, the only home ever owned by Nathaniel Hawthorne, which Lothrop purchased in 1883.

His death occurred in Boston in the midst of his work, after a few days' illness, March 18, 1892. He was laid to rest in Sleepy Hollow Cemetery, Concord, Massachusetts, on Ridge Hill, that spot so famous as the burial place of distinguished men and women.

After his death, his widow continued the business which merged with Lee & Shepard, in 1905, to form Lothrop, Lee & Shepard. This publisher was eventually acquired by William Morrow and Company, and was shuttered in 1999 after Morrow was acquired by HarperCollins.
