= Platt (surname) =

Platt is an English surname, and may refer to:

== People ==
- Aaron Platt (born 1981), American film director and cinematographer
- Abby Rakic-Platt (born 1993), British actress
- Adam Platt (born 1958), American writer and restaurant critic
- Alethea Hill Platt (1860–1932), American artist
- Alexander Platt (born 1965), American conductor and music director
- Alison Platt (born 1962), British businesswoman
- Alyce Platt (born 1964), Australian actress
- Andrew Platt (born 1988), American politician from Maryland
- Andy Platt (born 1963), British rugby league footballer
- Angela Platt (born 1979), Irish field hockey player
- Anthony Platt (born 1942), British sociologist and criminologist
- Anthony Leonard Platt, known as Unk (1981–2025), American DJ and rapper
- Ben Platt (disambiguation), several people
- Beryl Platt, Baroness Platt of Writtle (1923–2015), British politician
- Brian Platt (born 1985), American public administrator from Missouri
- Casper Platt (1892–1965), American judge from Illinois
- Charles Platt (disambiguation), several people
- Chester Platt (1857–1934), American newspaper publisher and businessman
- Christopher Platt (1934–1989), British historian
- Claude Platt (1904–1966), Australian sports shooter
- Clive Platt (born 1977), English footballer
- Colin Platt (1934–2015), British historian
- Conal Platt (born 1986), English footballer
- Dan Fellows Platt (1873–1937), American art collector and politician
- Darren Platt (died 2016), British television businessman
- David Platt (disambiguation), several people
- Deborah Majoras (née Platt) (fl. 2004–2008), American government official
- Denise Platt (born 1945), British civil servant
- Dick Platt (fl. 1930s), English footballer
- Don Platt (1930–2020), Canadian tennis player
- Donald Platt (fl. 2000–2006), English poet and educator
- Eddie Platt (1921–2010), American saxophonist
- Edmund Platt (1865–1939), American politician and banker from New York
- Edward Platt (1916–1974), American actor best known for his portrayal of "The Chief" in TV series Get Smart
- Edward Platt (author) (born 1968), English writer
- Eleanor Platt (1910–1974), American sculptor
- Elliott Ferrous-Martin Platt (born 2004), Canadian musician, known professionally as ElyOtto
- Erminnie A. Smith (née Platt) (1836–1886), American ethnographer
- Ethel Bliss Platt (1881–1971), American tennis player and art collector
- Frances Platt (fl. 1998–2021), British biochemist and pharmacologist
- Francis Platt (1849–1923), English anarchist
- Frank C. Platt (1866–1952), New York politician
- Geoff Platt (born 1985), Canadian ice hockey player
- Geoff Platt (journalist)
- George Platt (disambiguation), multiple people
- Hannah Platt (born 1990s), English comedian and writer
- Harry Platt (1886–1986), English surgeon
- Harry Platt (footballer) (1908–1993), English footballer
- Henry Platt (fl. 1896–1899), English footballer
- Henry C. Platt (1840–1904), American lawyer and politician from New York
- Herman Platt (1909–2005), American businessman and philanthropist
- Howard Platt (born 1938), American actor known for his role as "Officer Hopkins" in TV series Sanford and Son
- James Platt (disambiguation), several people
- Jayme Platt (born 1978), American ice hockey player
- Jeff Platt (born 1986), American sports commentator and poker player
- Jennifer Platt (fl. 1964–2002), British sociologist and educator
- Jenny Platt (born 1979), British actress
- Jessica Platt (born 1989), Canadian hockey player
- Jim Platt (born 1952), Northern Irish footballer
- Jim Platt (basketball) (born 1952), American college basketball coach
- Jo Platt (born 1973), British politician
- John Platt (disambiguation), several people
- Jon Platt (born 1964), American music executive
- Jonas Platt (1769–1834), New York politician
- Jonas M. Platt (1919–2000), U.S. Marine Corps major general
- Joseph Platt (disambiguation), multiple people
- Julia Platt (1857–1935), American embryologist and politician
- Julie Platt (born 1957), American banker and philanthropist
- Kalyar Platt (born 1972), Burmese herpetologist
- Karen Platt (fl. 1999–2007), British writer and publisher
- Karl Platt (born 1978), German mountain biker
- Ken Platt (1921–1998), British north-country comedian
- Kin Platt (1911–2003), American writer for radio
- Kristian Platt (born 1991), English footballer
- Larry Platt (born 1947), American civil rights advocate and musician
- Lauren Platt (born 1997), British TV presenter and singer
- Lenny Platt (born 1984), American actor
- Lewis E. Platt (1941–2005), American businessman and corporate director
- Lilly Platt (born 2008), British and Dutch environmentalist
- Liss Platt (born 1965), Canadian artist
- Louise Platt (1915–2003), American actress
- Loula Roberts Platt (1863–1934), suffragist and first woman to run for a seat in the North Carolina Senate
- Manu Platt (born 1980), American biomedical engineer
- Marc Platt (disambiguation), several people
- Mark Platt (rower) (born 1973), Canadian rower
- Marsha Platt (fl. 1993–1995), American politician from Massachusetts
- Martin Ward Platt (1954–2019), British neonatologist
- Mary R. P. Hatch (née Platt) (1848–1935), American writer
- Mary Platt Parmele (née Platt) (1843–1911), American historian and writer
- Mary Frances Platt (1953–2004), American writer and activist
- Matthew Platt (born 1997), English footballer
- Michael Platt (disambiguation), several people
- Moses Platt (fl. 1933), American folk singer
- Moss K. Platt (1808–1876), New York politician
- Nehemiah Platt (1797–1851), New York politician
- Nicholas Platt (born 1936), American diplomat
- Obadiah H. Platt (1806–1893), American newspaper publisher
- Oliver Platt (born 1960), American actor
- Orville H. Platt (1827–1905), American politician, proponent of the Platt Amendment
- Peter Platt (footballer) (1883–1921), English footballer
- Peter Platt (musician) (born 1965), Austrian composer and musician
- Phyllis Platt (1886–1950), British painter
- Polly Platt (1939–2011), American film producer, production designer and screenwriter
- Polly Platt (author) (1927–2008), American author
- Richard Platt (disambiguation), multiple people
- Robert Platt (disambiguation), several people
- Ronald Platt (born 1946), alias of Canadian criminal Albert Johnson Walker
- Ronnie Platt (born 1962), American singer
- Ruth Platt (fl. 2000s–2010s), British actress, writer and director
- Rutherford Platt (1894–1975), American nature writer and photographer
- Sam Platt (born 1958), American football player
- Samuel Platt (1812–1887), Canadian brewer and politician
- Sarah Platt-Decker (1856–1912), American suffragist
- Spencer Platt (disambiguation), multiple people
- Stephen R. Platt (fl. 2004–2018), American historian and writer
- Steve Platt (born 1954), British journalist, editor of New Statesman magazine
- Steven I. Platt (born 1947), American judge from Maryland
- Sue Platt (born 1940), British track and field athlete
- Sylvia Platt (born 1951), English swimmer
- Tara Platt (born 1978), American voice actress
- Ted Platt (1921–1996), English professional goalkeeper
- Thomas Platt (disambiguation), several people named Thomas or Tom
- Tony Platt (fl. 2000s–2010s), English sound engineer and producer
- Trevor Platt (1942–2020), British and Canadian oceanographer
- Victoria Platt (born 1972), American actress
- Virginia Bever Platt (1912–2009), American historian
- Whitey Platt (1920–1970), American baseball player
- Sir William Platt (1885–1975), British army general
- Woody Platt, American bluegrass musician
- Zephaniah Platt (1735–1807), American lawyer
- Zephaniah Platt (Michigan Attorney General) (1796–1871), American lawyer and politician
- Zephaniah C. Platt (1805–1884), American farmer, banker, and politician

== Fictional characters ==
- Bethany Platt, from Coronation Street
- David Platt (Coronation Street), from Coronation Street
- Gail Platt, from Coronation Street
- Kylie Platt from Coronation Street
- Lily Platt from Coronation Street
- Martin Platt, from Coronation Street
- Sarah Platt, from Coronation Street
- Trudy Platt, see list of Chicago P.D. characters

== See also ==
- Platt (disambiguation)
- Platts, now S&P Global Commodity Insights
- Platt Brothers, English textile machine manufacturers
- Mather & Platt, engineering firms
- Plett (surname)
