= Douglas, Massachusetts =

- Town
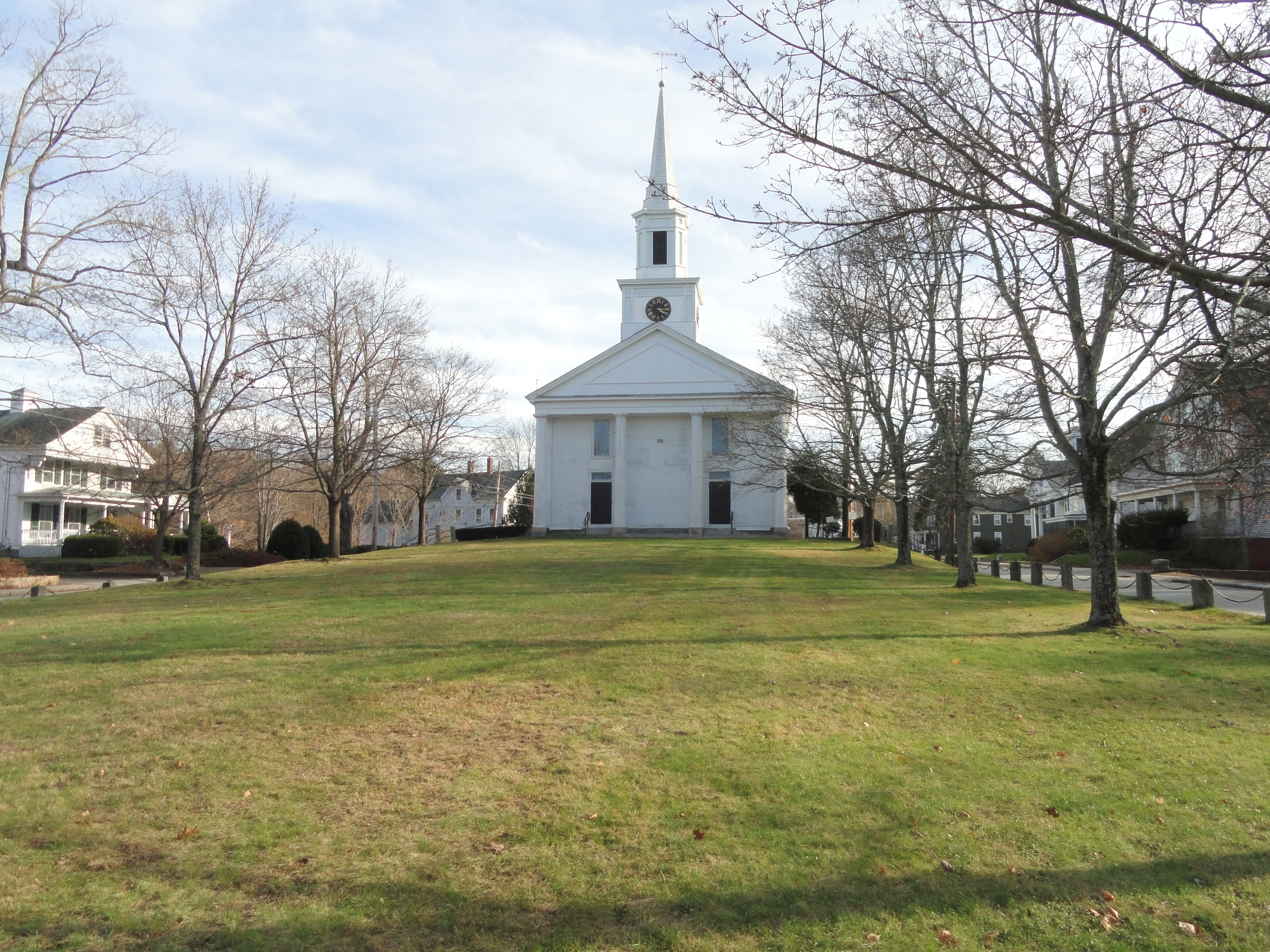
- Second Congregational Church

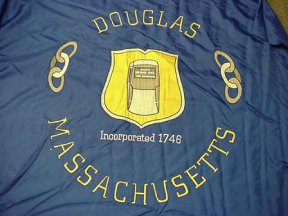
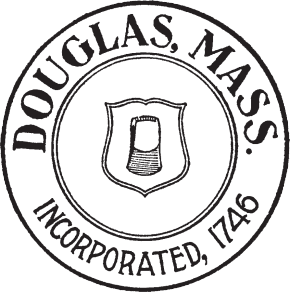
- Flag Seal
- Nicknames: D-town, The Big D
- Location in Worcester County and the state of Massachusetts.
- Coordinates: 42°03′15″N 71°44′24″W
- Country: United States
- State: Massachusetts
- County: Worcester
- Settled: 1721
- Incorporated: 1746

Government
  - Type: Open town meeting

Area
  - Total: 37.7 sq mi (97.7 km^{2})
  - Land: 36.4 sq mi (94.2 km^{2})
  - Water: 1.4 sq mi (3.5 km^{2})
- Elevation: 581 ft (177 m)

Population (2020)
  - Total: 8,983
  - Density: 247/sq mi (95.4/km^{2})
- Time zone: UTC−5 (Eastern)
  - Summer (DST): UTC−4 (Eastern)
- ZIP Code: 01516
- Area code: 508/774
- FIPS code: 25-17300
- GNIS feature ID: 0619479
- Website: www.douglas-ma.gov

Douglas is a town in southern Worcester County, Massachusetts, United States. The population was 8,983 at the 2020 census. It includes the Douglas State Forest, managed by the Department of Conservation and Recreation (DCR).

== History ==
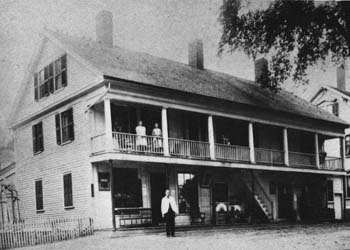
Jenckes Store as it appeared in the 1800s

The name of Douglas was first given to the territory of the town in the year 1746. New Sherborn or "New Sherborn Grant" had previously been its designation, since its first occupancy by the English settlers which was as early as 1715. The first English settlers came primarily from Sherborn, although many hailed from Natick as well. New Sherburn was removed from Suffolk County to Worcester County at its formation on April 2, 1731. The name Douglas was given in 1746, when Dr. William Douglass, an eminent physician of Boston, in consideration of the privilege of naming the township offered the inhabitants the sum of $500.00 as a fund for the establishment of free schools together with a tract of 30 acres (12 ha) of land with a dwelling house and barn thereon. It is said that there were subsequent pledges made by Dr. Douglas in the form of a bell for the Center School and 50 sterling pounds for seven years to support the ministry but quite a portion of these pledges were not received by the Town.

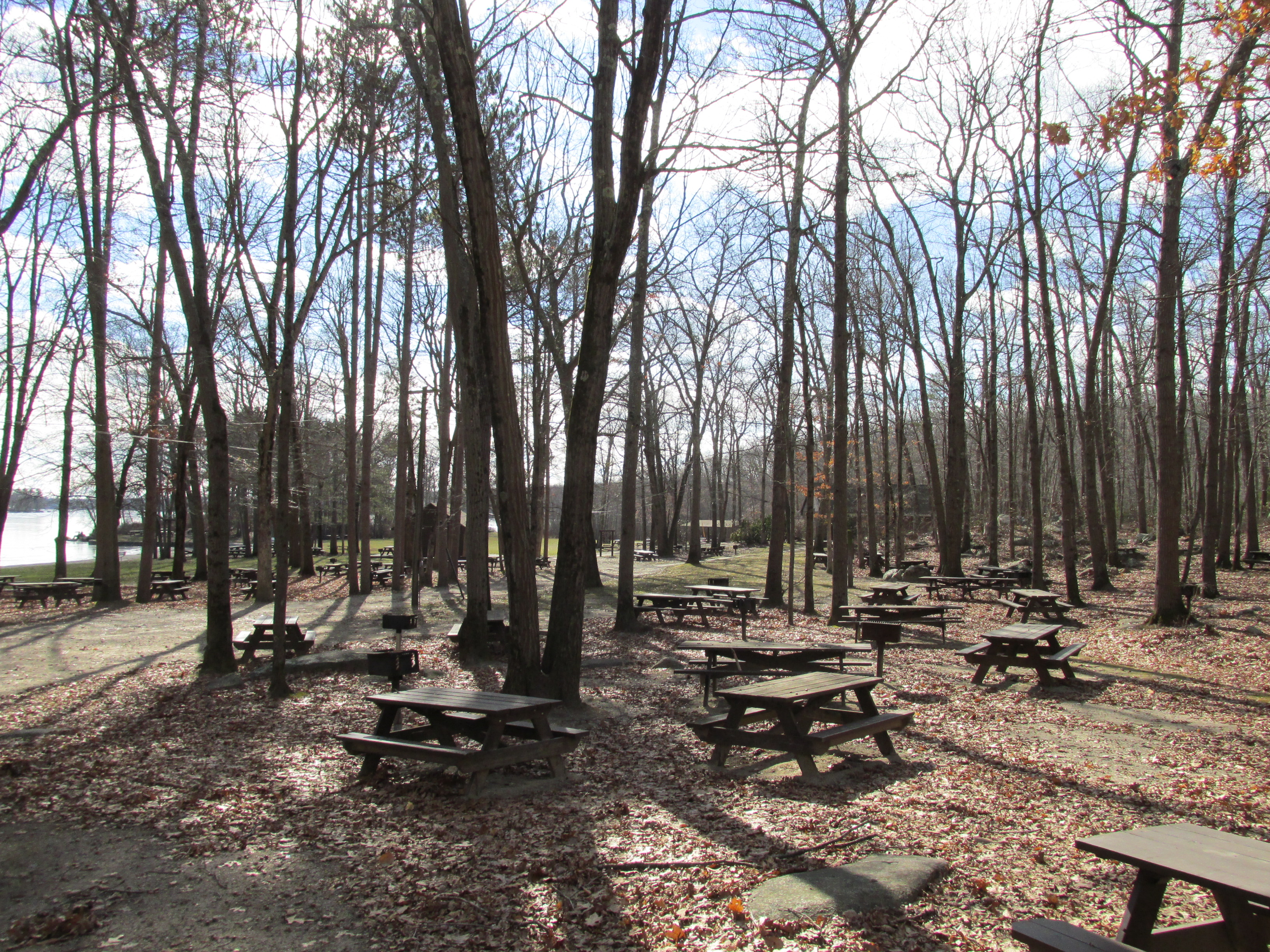
Douglas State Forest

Douglas's forests gave rise to a woodcutting industry and the Douglas axe company. A woolen manufacturing company, on the Mumford River in East Douglas, in recent times held by the Schuster family, has been prominent in the history of this community. General Lafayette, of France, stopped here during the Revolutionary War, to change horses, on his way to Boston to join General Washington. Lafayette was a hero of the American Revolution and the French Revolution.

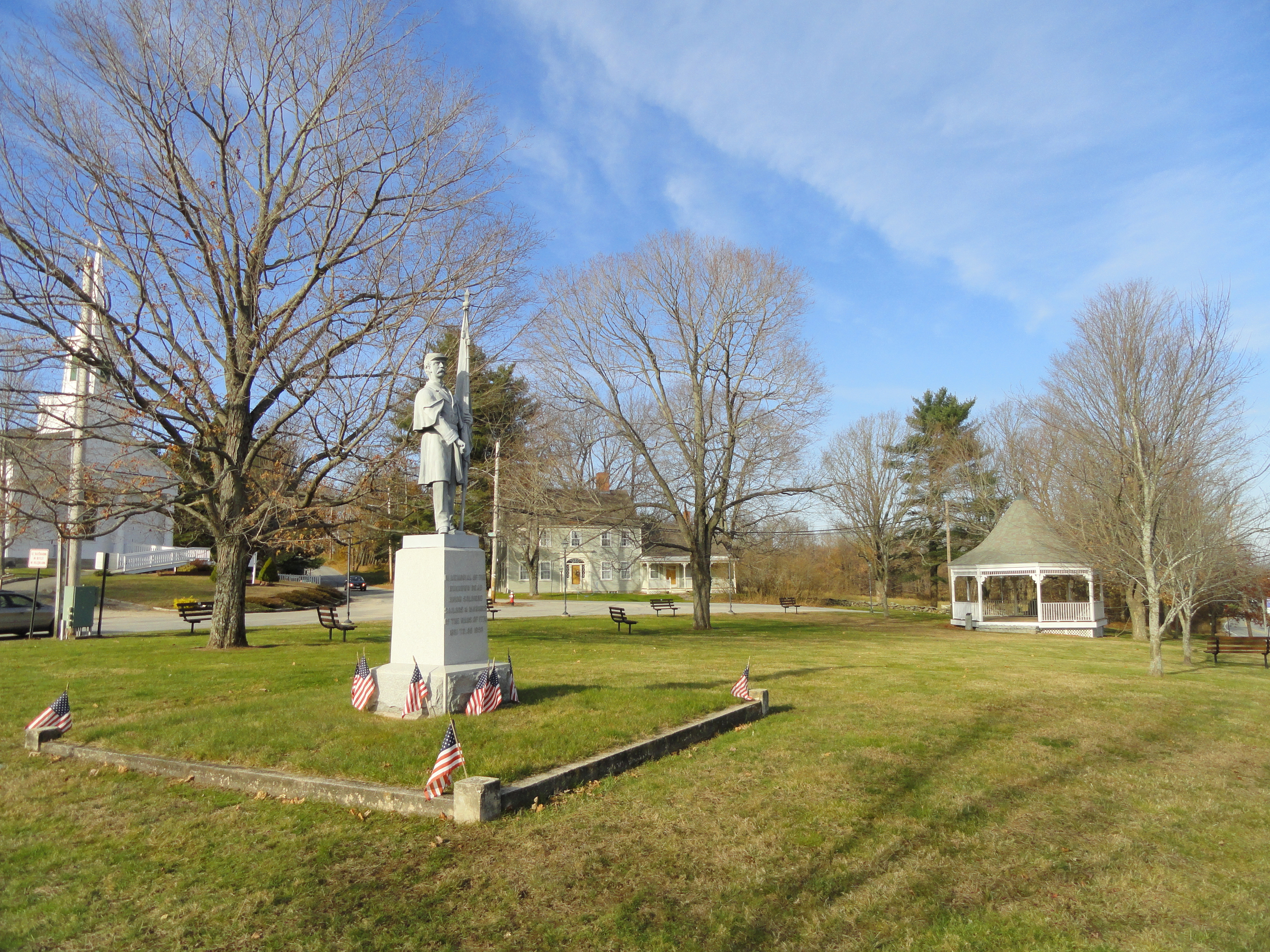
Old Town Common

From a very early period reaching beyond 1635, bands of Native Americans, principally the Nipmuc tribe, dominated this region of Worcester County. The Blackstone River was once called the Nipmuc River. Most of Douglas is part of the Blackstone River Valley National Heritage Corridor.

The underlying geology consists of rocks rich in quartz, feldspar, and mica. Boulders are plentifully scattered all over town, and gold and silver ores are said to be found in some localities. Large quantities of building and ornamental stone are quarried from the granite ledges found in the center of town which is shipped to almost every section of New England.

In 1946, as part of the town's tricentennial anniversary celebration and to welcome home for the troops returning from World War II, Winfield A. Schuster arranged an exhibition game between the Boston Red Sox and the New York Yankees that was played at the local ballpark known as Soldiers Field on September 26. The game had an estimated attendance of 12,000 and was won by the Yankees, 8-7.

Police Chief Patrick Foley of Douglas was elected vice president of the International Association of Chiefs of Police (IACP), at the annual convention in Denver, Colorado, in 2009.

A common misconception in Douglas is with regard to the New England Trunkline Trail. Many believe that railroad tracks were laid here for commuting from northern Connecticut to northern Massachusetts. In fact, they were used to haul ice from Wallum Lake as interstate commerce. Today, one can hike these trails through Massachusetts and Connecticut. The New England Trunkline was originally planned as a railroad, but the financier died in the sinking of the Titanic.

=== The E. N. Jenckes Store Museum ===
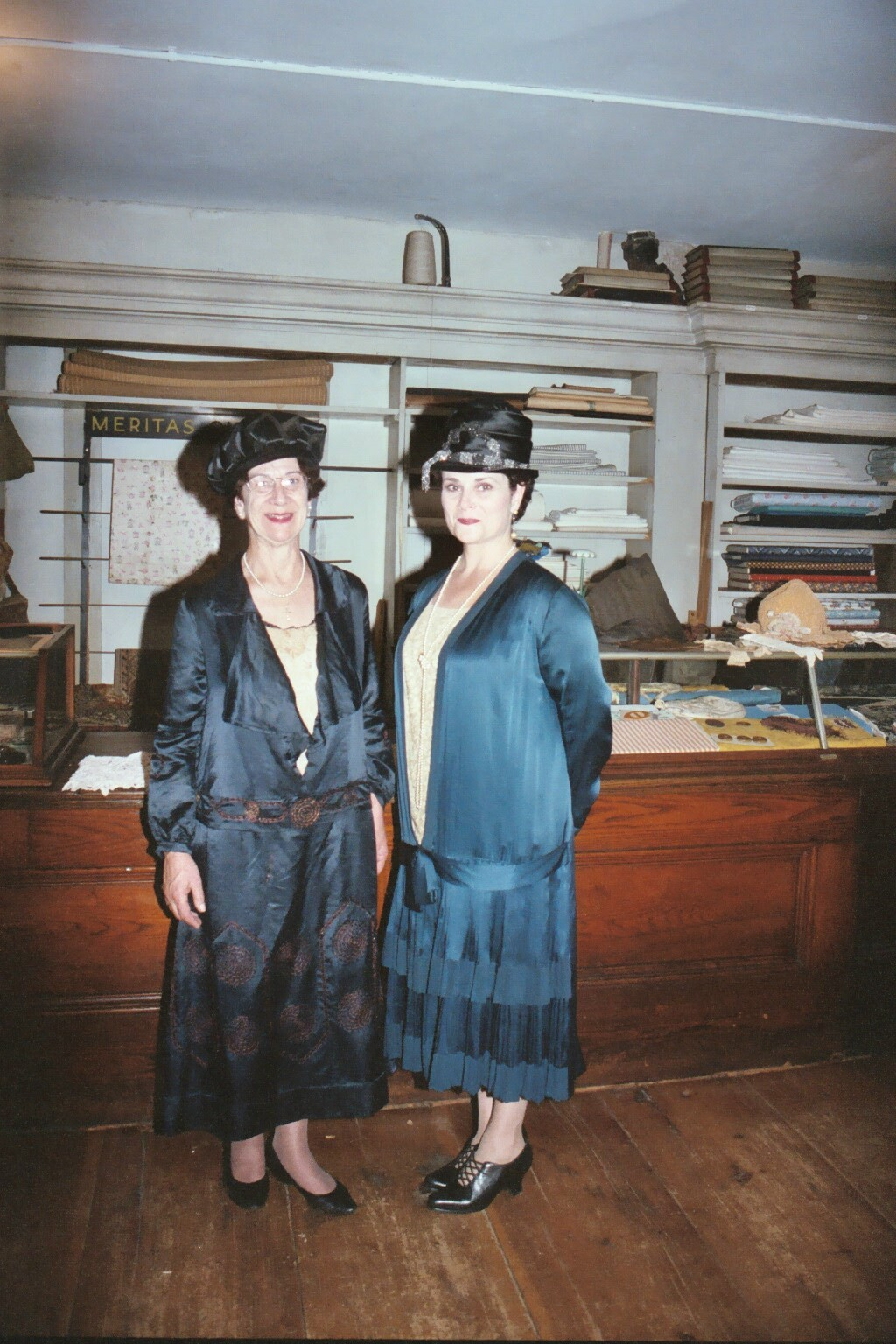
Reenactors of Malma & Helen during Oktoberfest

The E.N. Jenckes store and museum sits on Main Street in the village of East Douglas. Ebenezer Balkcom opened a small store at the corner of Main and Pleasant (now Depot) streets during the 1830s, when East Douglas was becoming the economic center of the town. The store changed hands (sold to Gardner Chase) until he retired and sold the building to Edward L. Jenckes. After Jenckes' death in 1924, his daughters E. Mialma and Helen R. continued to run the store until the store closed in 1964. The store remained closed until 1972, when the property was donated to the Douglas Historical Society, where it was carefully restored to its original general store appearance of 100 years ago.

== Geography ==
According to the United States Census Bureau, the town has a total area of 37.7 square miles (98 km^{2}), of which 36.4 square miles (94 km^{2}) is land and 1.3 square miles (3.4 km^{2}), or 3.57%, is water. It includes the Douglas State Forest and is home to Wallum Lake and Whitins Reservoir.

The town is also adjacent to the northwestern border of the state Rhode Island, and northeastern border Connecticut, with the towns of Burrillville, Rhode Island to the south of Douglas, and Thompson, Connecticut to the southwest.

The principal elevations are Bald Hill, 711 feet (217 m), Wallum Pond Hill, 778 feet (237 m), Mount Ashworth, 713 feet (218 m), and Mount Daniel, 735 feet (224 m). There are numerous ponds in Douglas: Wallum Pond in the southwestern section, covering approximately 150 acres (61 ha); Badluck Pond in the western part of town, covering about 110 acres (45 ha); the largest pond is Whitin Reservoir, also in the western part of town, covering about 400 acres (160 ha); and Manchaug Pond in the northern part, about 93 acres (38 ha).

=== Neighborhoods ===
- East Douglas
- Tasseltop

== Education ==
Douglas High School

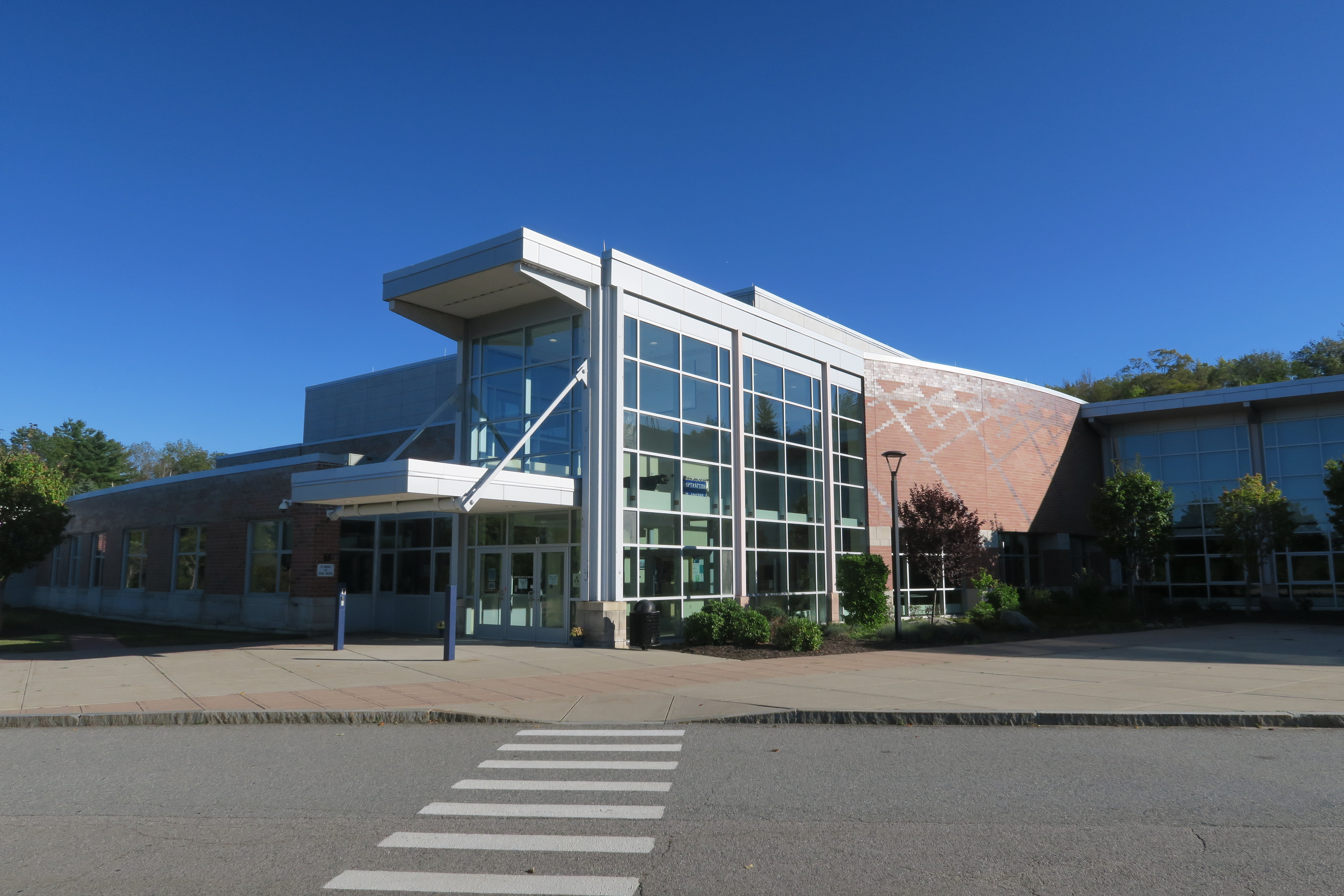
Building

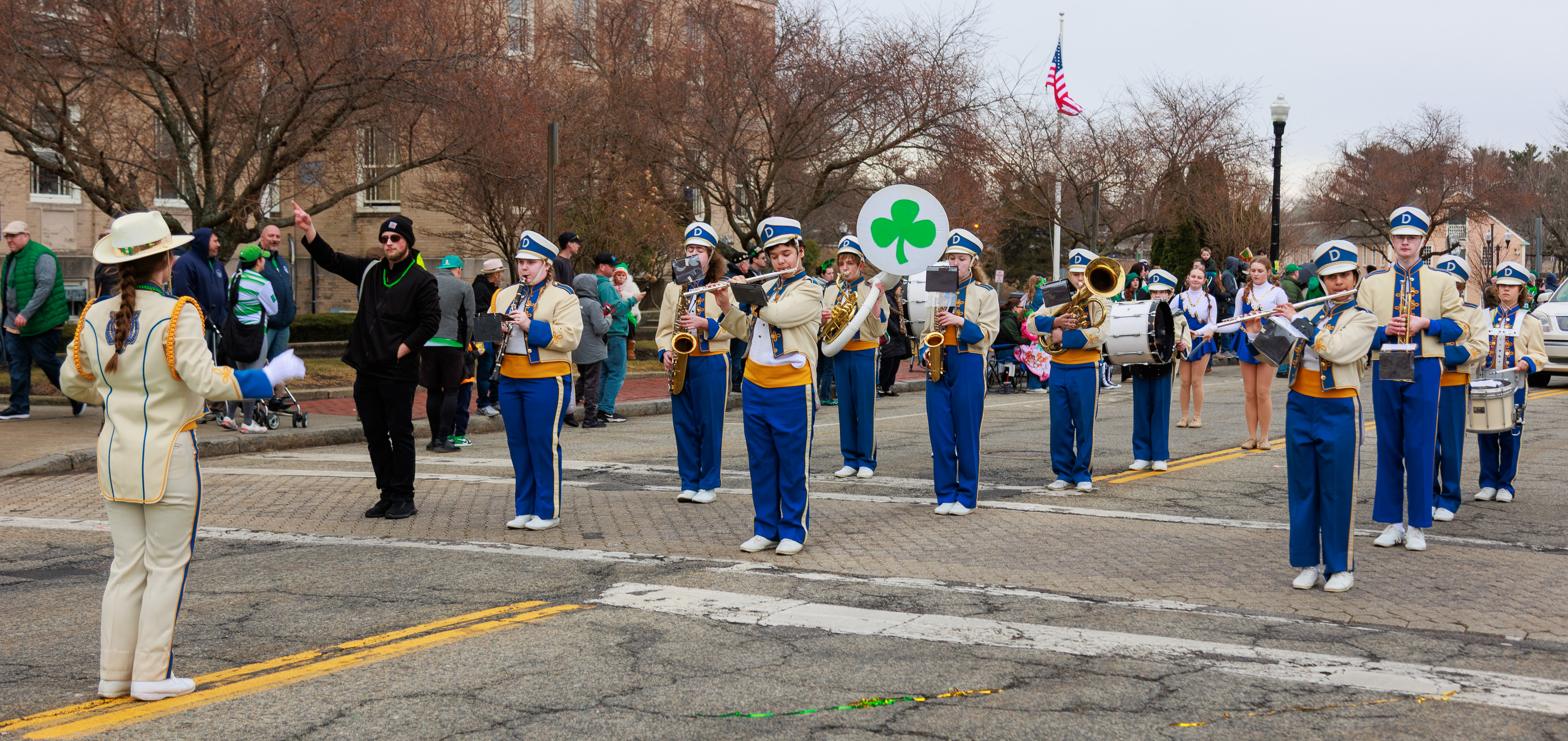
Marching Band

Douglas has four public schools for children grades preschool through twelfth grade to attend. Douglas Primary School enrolls 230 students (2016–2017) in grades preschool, Kindergarten, and first grade. Douglas Elementary School enrolls 404 students (2016–2017) in second grade through fifth grade. Douglas Middle School enrolls 360 students (2016–2017) in sixth through eighth grade. Douglas High School enrolls 394 students (2016–2017) in ninth through twelfth grade.

Douglas is also a member of the thirteen towns that make up Blackstone Valley Regional Vocational Technical High School which provides educational opportunities for students grades 9–12 seeking experience and education in a specific career field.

Douglas High School athletics compete as part of the Dual Valley Conference league with Blackstone-Millville Regional High School, Hopedale High School, Nipmuc Regional High School, Sutton High School, and Whitinsville Christian High School.

== Demographics ==
Historical population
Year	Pop.	±%
1790	1,079	—
1850	1,878	+74.1%
1860	2,442	+30.0%
1870	2,182	−10.6%
1880	2,241	+2.7%
1890	1,908	−14.9%
1900	2,113	+10.7%
1910	2,152	+1.8%
1920	2,181	+1.3%
1930	2,195	+0.6%
1940	2,617	+19.2%
1950	2,624	+0.3%
1960	2,559	−2.5%
1970	2,947	+15.2%
1980	3,730	+26.6%
1990	5,438	+45.8%
2000	7,045	+29.6%
2010	8,471	+20.2%
2020	8,983	+6.0%
2023*	9,241	+2.9%
* = population estimate. Source: United States census records and Population Estimates Program data.

As of the census of 2000, there were 7,045 people, 2,476 households, and 1,936 families residing in the town. The population density was 193.7 inhabitants per square mile (74.8/km^{2}). There were 2,588 housing units at an average density of 71.2 per square mile (27.5/km^{2}). The racial makeup of the town was 97.36% White, 0.48% African American, 0.13% Native American, 0.64% Asian, 0.07% Pacific Islander, 0.28% from other races, and 1.04% from two or more races. Hispanic or Latino of any race were 0.95% of the population. From 2000 to 2010 there was a population increase of 20.24%.

There were 2,476 households, out of which 43.1% had children under the age of 18 living with them, 66.6% were married couples living together, 8.1% had a female householder with no husband present, and 21.8% were non-families. 17.3% of all households were made up of individuals, and 6.7% had someone living alone who was 65 years of age or older. The average household size was 2.85 and the average family size was 3.23.

In the town, the population was spread out, with 29.6% under the age of 18, 6.1% from 18 to 24, 36.4% from 25 to 44, 20.1% from 45 to 64, and 7.7% who were 65 years of age or older. The median age was 34 years. For every 100 females, there were 100.7 males. For every 100 females age 18 and over, there were 97.7 males.

The median income for a household in the town was $60,529, and the median income for a family was $67,210. Males had a median income of $45,893 versus $31,287 for females. The per capita income for the town was $23,036. About 2.3% of families and 4.6% of the population were below the poverty line, including 4.4% of those under age 18 and 13.0% of those age 65 or over.

== Government ==
The town has an open town meeting form of government. The government broadcasts many of its meetings on the Apple TV platform as well as internet and local cable TV. State, Federal and county level elected state officials are shown in the infobox.

State government
State Representative(s):	Joseph D. McKenna (R)
State Senator(s):	Ryan Fattman (R)
Governor's Councilor(s):	Paul DePalo (D)
Federal government
U.S. Representative(s):	Jim McGovern (D-2nd District),
U.S. Senators:	Elizabeth Warren (D), Ed Markey (D)

== Gallery ==
A sunset viewed from the Whitin Reservoir in Douglas

The town common, featuring a gazebo

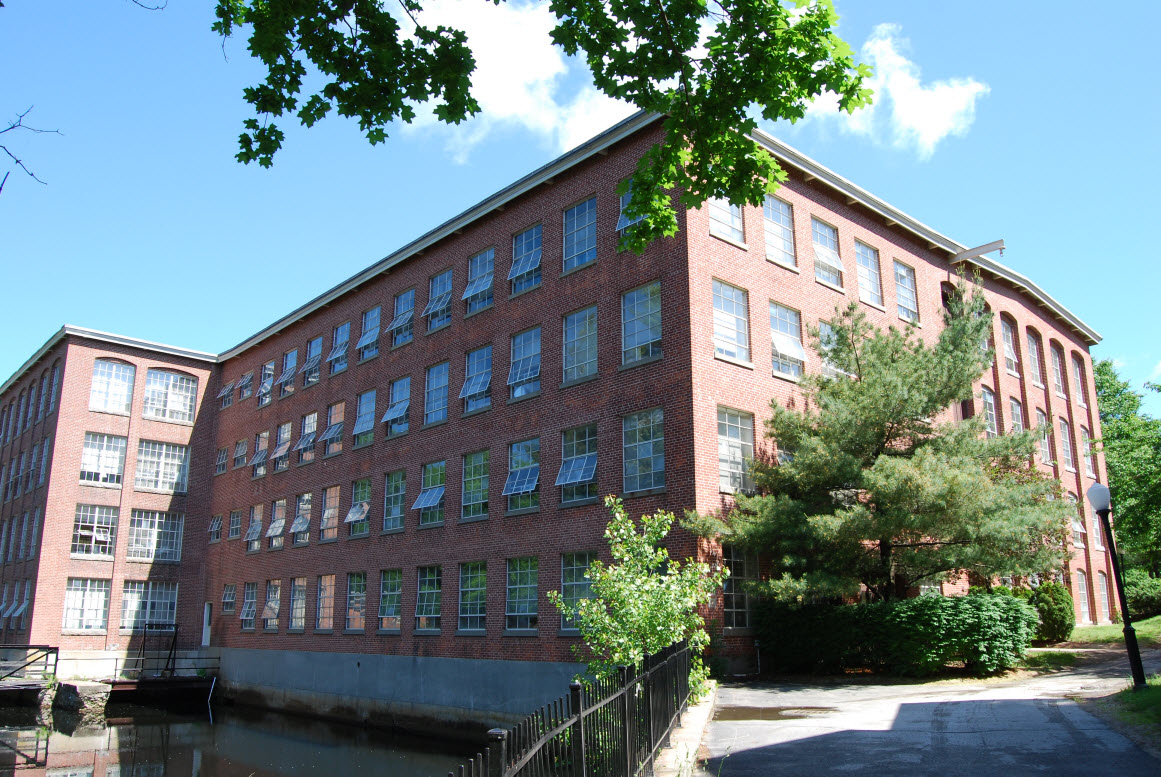
Hayward Landing apartments in Douglas

== See also ==
- Old Douglas Center Historic District
- Simon Fairfield Public Library
