= Peter Platt =

Peter Platt may refer to:

- Peter Platt (footballer) (1883–1921), English footballer
- Peter Platt (musician) (born 1965), Austrian musician and composer
