= O. H. Platt =

O. H. Platt may refer to:

- Orville H. Platt
  - O.H. Platt High School, name after Orville H. Platt
- Obadiah H. Platt
