= Sundae =

Ice cream dessert

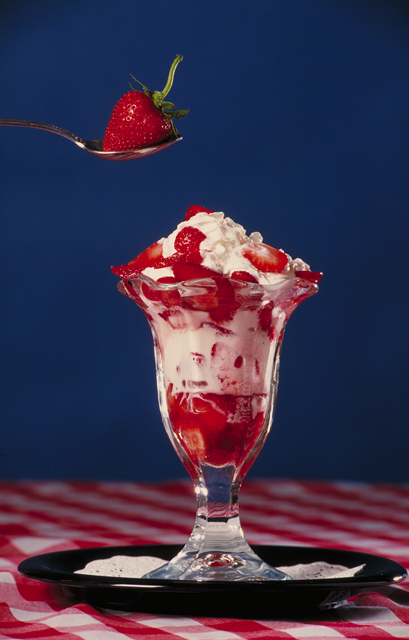
- A strawberry sundae served in a glass cup
- Type: Ice cream
- Course: Dessert
- Place of origin: United States
- Main ingredients: Ice cream, sauce or syrup, various toppings

A sundae ( /ˈsʌndeɪ, ˈsʌndi/) is a frozen dessert that consists of ice cream or frozen yogurt topped with a sweet sauce or syrup and other ingredients. The ice cream is usually scooped, and is typically eaten with other toppings and mix-ins such as sprinkles, whipped cream, marshmallows, chocolates, nuts, confections, maraschino cherries, or other fruits.

== Etymology ==
The first recorded use in the Oxford English Dictionary, from an advertisement in Ithaca, New York, April 5, 1892, spells the word "Sunday": "Evidence suggests that the use of Sunday to designate an ice-cream dish of this kind originates with Chester Platt, proprietor of Platt and Colt's Pharmacy in Ithaca, New York, who is said to have served it ... after the Sunday church service on 3 April 1892. A letter from a patent attorney dated 24 March 1894 shows that Platt sought advice on trademark protection for the use of 'Sunday' for ice-cream novelties a few days earlier." The respelling as "sundae" may be a result of that trademark protection: "The motivation for the subsequent respelling of the word ... is uncertain: it may reflect an attempt by other retailers to avoid a perceived breach of trademark; it may be a reaction to the religious associations of Sunday as a day of abstinence; or it may simply have been intended to be eye-catching."

== History ==
Among the many stories about the invention of the sundae, a frequent theme is that the ice cream sundae was a variation of the popular ice cream soda. According to an account published by the Evanston Public Library (Illinois), the sale of soda was prohibited on Sundays in Illinois because they were considered too "frilly". Other origin stories for the sundae focus on the novelty or inventiveness of the treat or the name of the originator and make no mention of legal pressures.

The ice cream sundae soon became the weekend semi-official soda fountain confection at the beginning of the 1900s and quickly gained popularity. The Ice Cream Trade Journal for 1909 listed, along with plain, or French sundae, such unique varieties as Robin Hood sundae, Cocoa Caramel sundae, Black Hawk sundae, Angel Cake sundae, Cherry Dip sundae, Cinnamon Peak sundae, Opera sundae, Fleur D'Orange sundae, Knickerbocker sundae, Tally-Ho Sundae, Bismarck and George Washington sundaes, to name a few.

== Contested origins ==
Various localities have claimed to be the birthplace of the ice cream sundae, including Plainfield, Illinois; New Orleans, Louisiana; Cleveland, Ohio; and New York City. According to What's Cooking America, the biggest rivalry (referred to as the "Sundae War") to claim the invention of the ice cream sundae is between Two Rivers, Wisconsin, and Ithaca, New York.

=== Two Rivers, Wisconsin, in 1881 ===
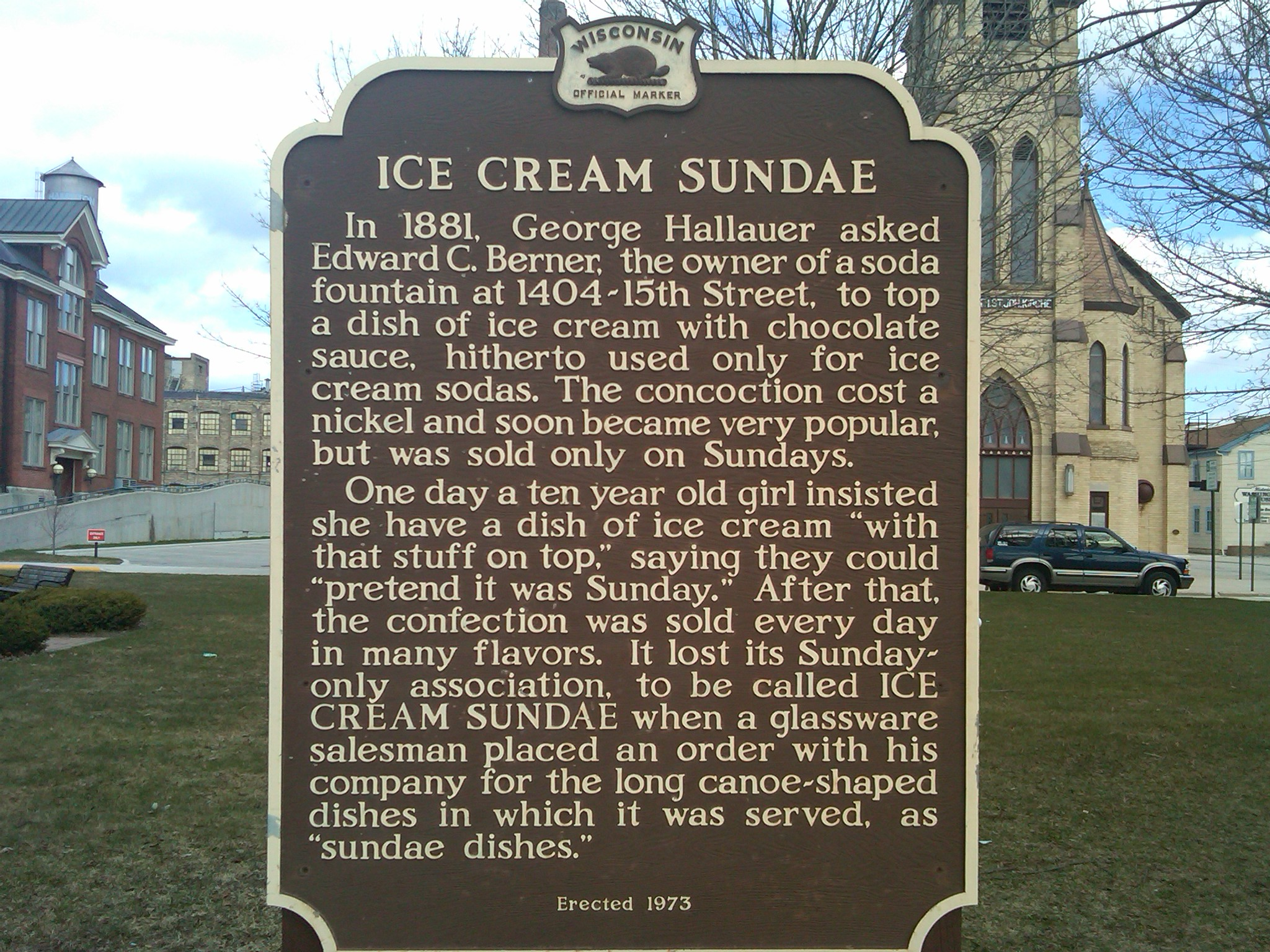
Wisconsin Historical Marker detailing Two Rivers as the locale of the invention of the ice cream sundae – Central Park, Two Rivers, Wisconsin

Two Rivers' claim is based on the story of George Hallauer asking Edward C. Berners, the owner of Berners' Soda Fountain, to drizzle chocolate syrup over ice cream in 1881. Berners eventually did and wound up selling the treat for a nickel, originally only on Sundays, but later every day. According to this story, the spelling changed when a glass salesman ordered canoe-shaped dishes. When Berners died in 1939, the Chicago Tribune headlined his obituary "Man Who Made First Ice Cream Sundae Is Dead".

Residents of Two Rivers have contested the claims of other cities to the right to claim the title "birthplace of the ice cream sundae". When Ithaca, New York's mayor Carolyn K. Peterson proclaimed a day to celebrate her city as the birthplace of the sundae, she received postcards from Two Rivers' citizens reiterating that town's claim. Berners would have only been 16 or 17 in 1881, so it is therefore "improbable" that he would have owned an ice cream shop in that year. They also state that the obituary dates Berners' first sundae to 1899 rather than 1881.

=== Buffalo, New York, in 1889 ===
Buffalo's Stoddart Bros. Drug Store advertised serving up ice cream sodas garnished with fruit syrup and whipped cream in the pages of The Buffalo Evening News and the Buffalo Courier as early as 1889.

=== Evanston, Illinois, in 1890 ===
Evanston was one of the first locations to pass a blue law against selling ice cream sodas in 1890. "Some ingenious confectioners and drug store operators [in Evanston]... obeying the law, served ice cream with the syrup of your choice without the soda [on Sundays]. Thereby complying with the law... This sodaless soda was the Sunday soda." As sales of the dessert continued on Mondays, local Methodist leaders then objected to naming the dish after the Sabbath, so the spelling of the name was changed to sundae.

=== Ithaca, New York, in 1892 ===
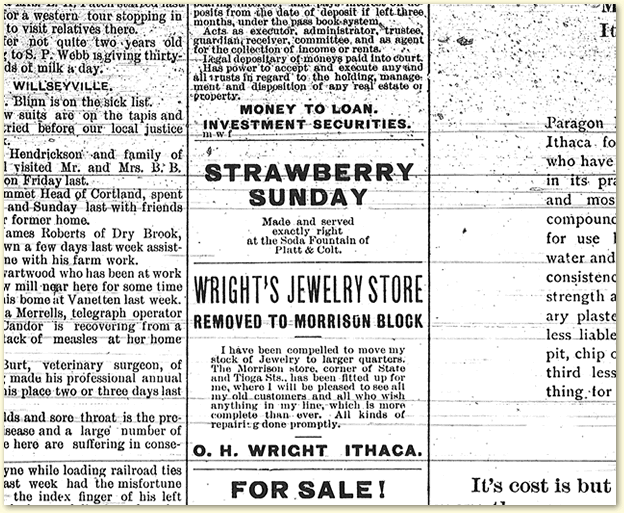
Ithaca Daily Journal, May 28, 1892

Supporting Ithaca's claim to be "the birthplace of the ice cream sundae", researchers at The History Center in Tompkins County, New York, provide an account of how the sundae came to be: On Sunday, April 3, 1892, in Ithaca, John M. Scott, a Unitarian Church minister, and Chester Platt, co-owner of Platt & Colt Pharmacy, created the first historically documented sundae. Platt covered dishes of ice cream with cherry syrup and candied cherries on a whim. The men named the dish "Cherry Sunday" in honor of the day it was created. The oldest-known written evidence of a sundae is Platt & Colt's newspaper ad for a "Cherry Sunday" placed in the Ithaca Daily Journal on April 5, 1892. By May 1892, the Platt & Colt soda fountain also served "Strawberry Sundays" and later, "Chocolate Sundays".

Platt & Colt's "Sundays" grew so popular that by 1894, Chester Platt attempted to trademark the term ice cream "Sunday".

=== Plainfield, Illinois ===
Plainfield, Illinois, has also claimed to be the home of the first ice cream sundae. A local belief is that a Plainfield druggist named Mr. Sonntag created the dish "after the urgings of patrons to serve something different." He named it the "sonntag" after himself, and since Sonntag is the German word for Sunday, the name was translated to Sunday, and later was spelled sundae.

== Types ==
=== Classic ice cream sundae ===
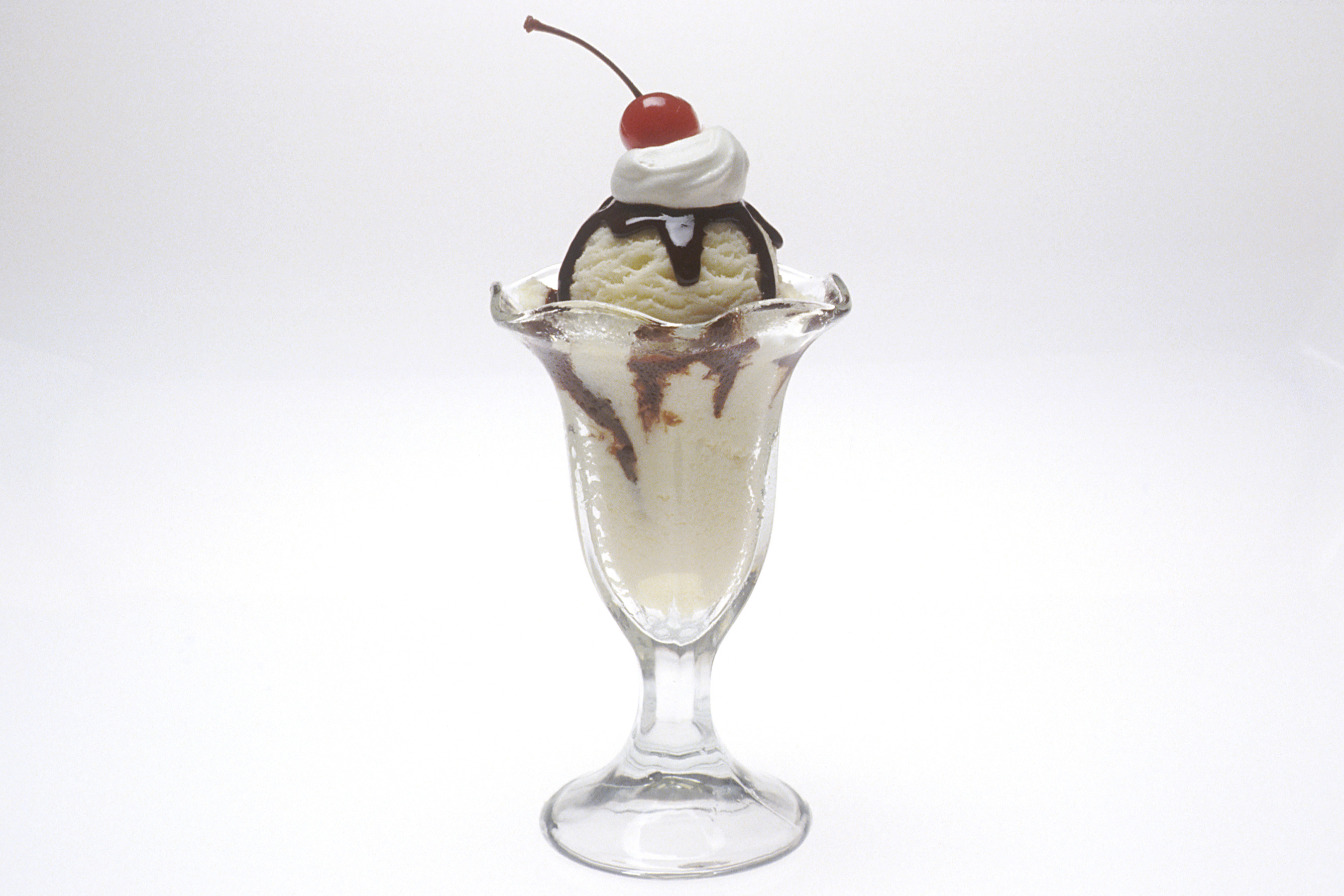
The original sundae consists of vanilla ice cream topped with a flavored sauce or syrup, whipped cream and a maraschino cherry.

The original sundae consists of vanilla ice cream topped with a flavored sauce or syrup, whipped cream, and a maraschino cherry. Classic sundaes are typically named after flavored syrup employed in the recipe: cherry sundae, chocolate sundae, strawberry sundae, raspberry sundae, etc. The classic sundae is traditionally served in a tulip-shaped, footed glass vase. Due to the long association between the shape of the glass and the dessert, this style of serving dish is generally now known as a sundae glass.

=== Banana split ===
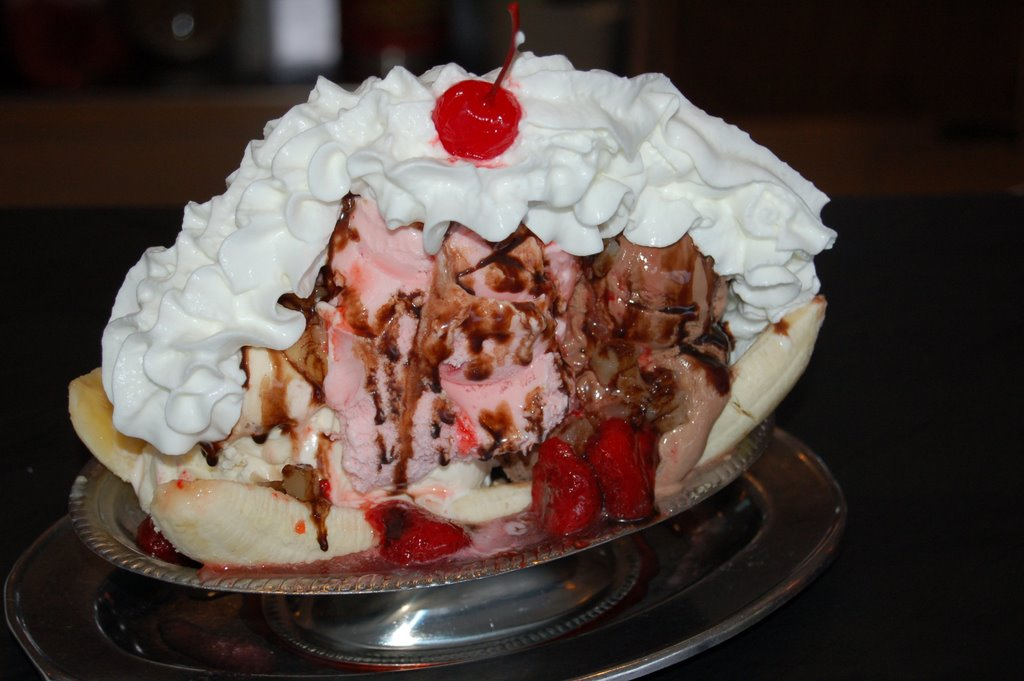
A banana split

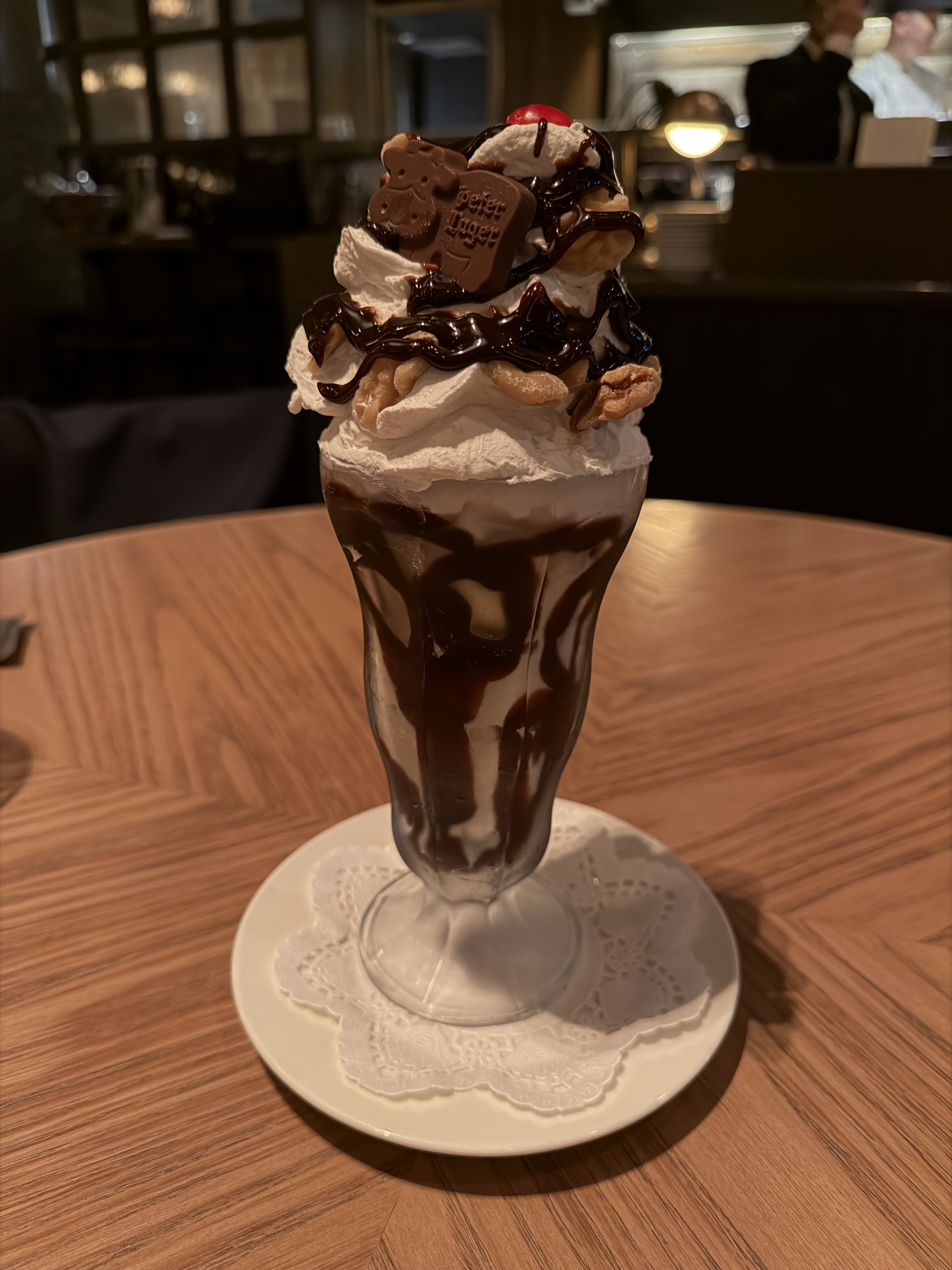
A hot fudge sundae with homemade whipped cream from Peter Luger's Steakhouse in Tokyo, Japan

This dessert consists of two halves of a banana, sliced lengthwise. The classic banana split consists of strawberry ice cream topped with chocolate syrup, chocolate ice cream topped with crushed pineapple, and vanilla ice cream topped with strawberry syrup. Each scoop is individually garnished with whipped cream and a maraschino cherry.

=== Parfait ===
Parfait is a sundae served in a tall glass filled with layers of ice cream or yogurt, gelatine, and flavorings such as syrups, whipped cream, granola, fresh fruit or liqueurs.

=== Knickerbocker glory ===
This ice cream sundae is served in a large tall glass, consisting of layers of ice cream, jelly, fruit, and cream, topped with syrup, nuts, whipped cream, and often a cherry; it is popular in the United Kingdom.

=== Brownie sundae ===
This is a rich sundae made with brownies, vanilla ice cream, chocolate syrup, peanuts, hot fudge, and whipped cream, often topped with a maraschino cherry.

=== Tin roof sundae ===
The tin roof sundae (first made in the 1930s, at the Potter Sundry soda fountain in Potter, Nebraska) is served in a tall glass. At the bottom is vanilla ice cream, then chocolate sauce, chocolate ice cream, marshmallow sauce, and finally a generous sprinkling of Spanish (aka red, skin-on) peanuts. Over the years a less elaborate version with vanilla ice cream, chocolate sauce and Spanish peanuts, has become more common. Several ice cream manufacturers (Blue Bell, Bryers, Turkey Hill) have created tin roof sundae flavors, based on the original recipe. Senator Steve Erdman of Nebraska has advocated for the tin roof sundae to be named the state's "Official Ice Cream Sundae."
