= East Douglas, Massachusetts =

- CDP
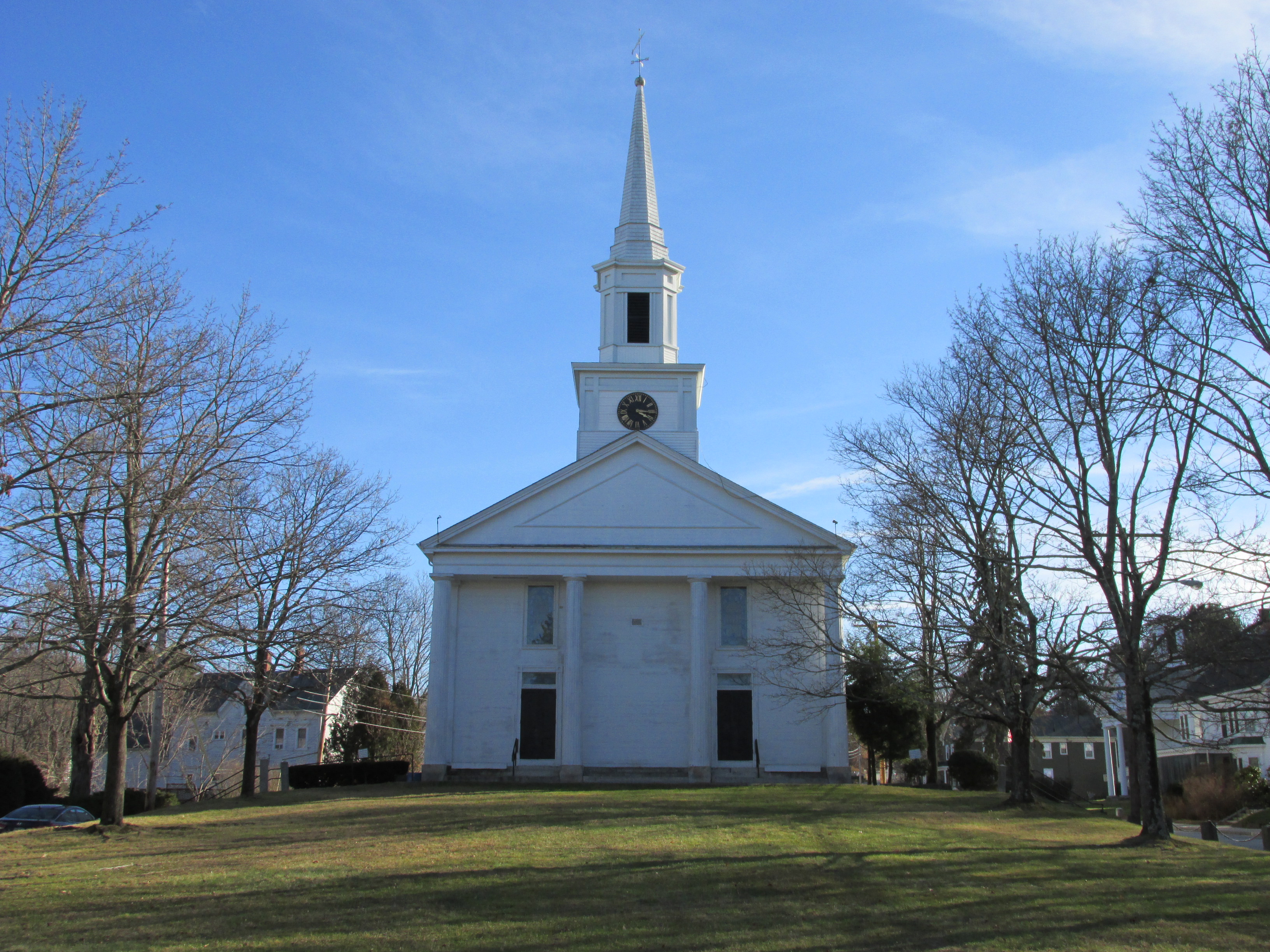
- Second Congregational Church

- Location in Worcester County and the state of Massachusetts.
- Coordinates: 42°4′31″N 71°42′49″W
- Country: United States
- State: Massachusetts
- County: Worcester

Area
  - Total: 3.53 sq mi (9.14 km^{2})
  - Land: 3.41 sq mi (8.82 km^{2})
  - Water: 0.12 sq mi (0.31 km^{2})
- Elevation: 407 ft (124 m)

Population (2020)
  - Total: 2,702
  - Density: 793.0/sq mi (306.18/km^{2})
- Time zone: UTC-5 (Eastern (EST))
  - Summer (DST): UTC-4 (EDT)
- ZIP code: 01516
- Area code: 508
- FIPS code: 25-18875
- GNIS feature ID: 0610982

East Douglas is a census-designated place (CDP) in the town of Douglas in Worcester County, Massachusetts, United States. As of the 2020 census, East Douglas had a population of 2,702.

== Geography ==
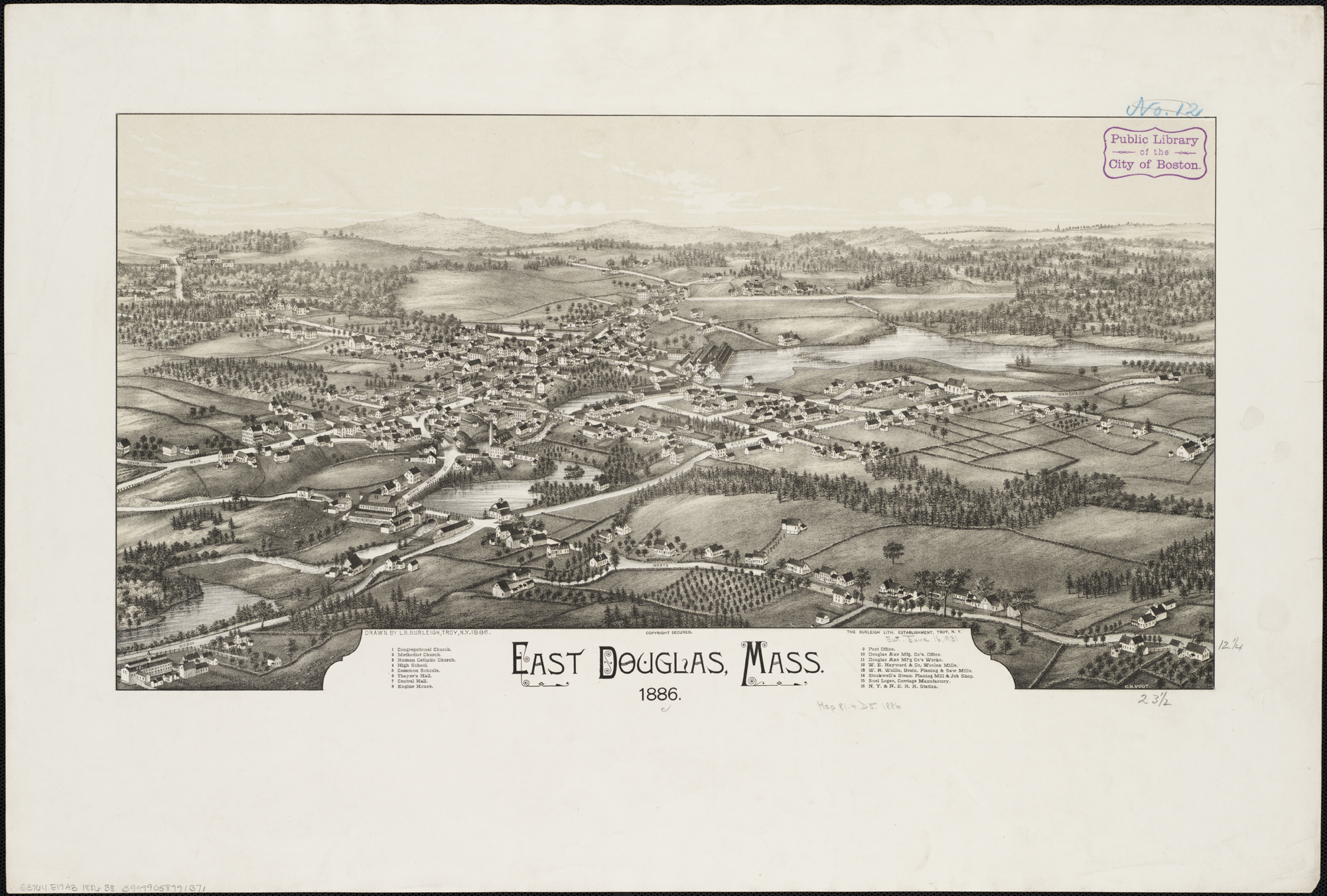
Print of East Douglas from 1886 by L.R. Burleigh with listing of landmarks

East Douglas is located at 42°4′31″N 71°42′49″W (42.075272, -71.713636).

According to the United States Census Bureau, the CDP has a total area of 9.1 km^{2} (3.5 sq mi), of which 8.9 km^{2} (3.4 sq mi) is land and 0.2 km^{2} (0.077 sq mi) (2.56%) is water.

== Demographics ==
Historical population
Census	Pop.	Note	%±
2020	2,702		—
U.S. Decennial Census

=== 2020 census ===
As of the 2020 census, East Douglas had a population of 2,702. The median age was 41.8 years. 20.2% of residents were under the age of 18 and 15.4% of residents were 65 years of age or older. For every 100 females there were 96.5 males, and for every 100 females age 18 and over there were 93.3 males age 18 and over.

91.0% of residents lived in urban areas, while 9.0% lived in rural areas.

There were 1,073 households in East Douglas, of which 29.8% had children under the age of 18 living in them. Of all households, 49.0% were married-couple households, 16.7% were households with a male householder and no spouse or partner present, and 25.6% were households with a female householder and no spouse or partner present. About 24.7% of all households were made up of individuals and 12.0% had someone living alone who was 65 years of age or older.

There were 1,124 housing units, of which 4.5% were vacant. The homeowner vacancy rate was 1.0% and the rental vacancy rate was 3.5%.

Racial composition as of the 2020 census
Race	Number	Percent
White	2,472	91.5%
Black or African American	23	0.9%
American Indian and Alaska Native	1	0.0%
Asian	24	0.9%
Native Hawaiian and Other Pacific Islander	0	0.0%
Some other race	35	1.3%
Two or more races	147	5.4%
Hispanic or Latino (of any race)	90	3.3%

=== 2000 census ===
As of the census of 2000, there were 2,319 people, 916 households, and 628 families residing in the CDP. The population density was 261.8 people /km^{2} (678 people/mi^{2}). There were 936 housing units at an average density of 105.7 units /km^{2} (274 units/mi^{2}). The racial makeup of the CDP was 97.59% White, 0.43% African American, 0.43% Asian, 0.39% from other races, and 1.16% from two or more races. Hispanic or Latino of any race were 0.86% of the population.

There were 916 households, out of which 35.8% had children under the age of 18 living with them, 54.0% were married couples living together, 11.1% had a female householder with no husband present, and 31.4% were non-families. 27.0% of all households were made up of individuals, and 12.6% had someone living alone who was 65 years of age or older. The average household size was 2.53 and the average family size was 3.10.

In the CDP, the population was spread out, with 27.1% under the age of 18, 6.3% from 18 to 24, 37.0% from 25 to 44, 17.5% from 45 to 64, and 12.1% who were 65 years of age or older. The median age was 34 years. For every 100 females, there were 93.4 males. For every 100 females age 18 and over, there were 90.2 males.

The median income for a household in the CDP was $55,208, and the median income for a family was $58,517. Males had a median income of $41,116 versus $31,420 for females. The per capita income for the CDP was $22,274. About 6.8% of families and 9.7% of the population were below the poverty line, including 13.6% of those under age 18 and 26.0% of those age 65 or over.
