= Douglas State Forest =

Protected area in Massachusetts, United States

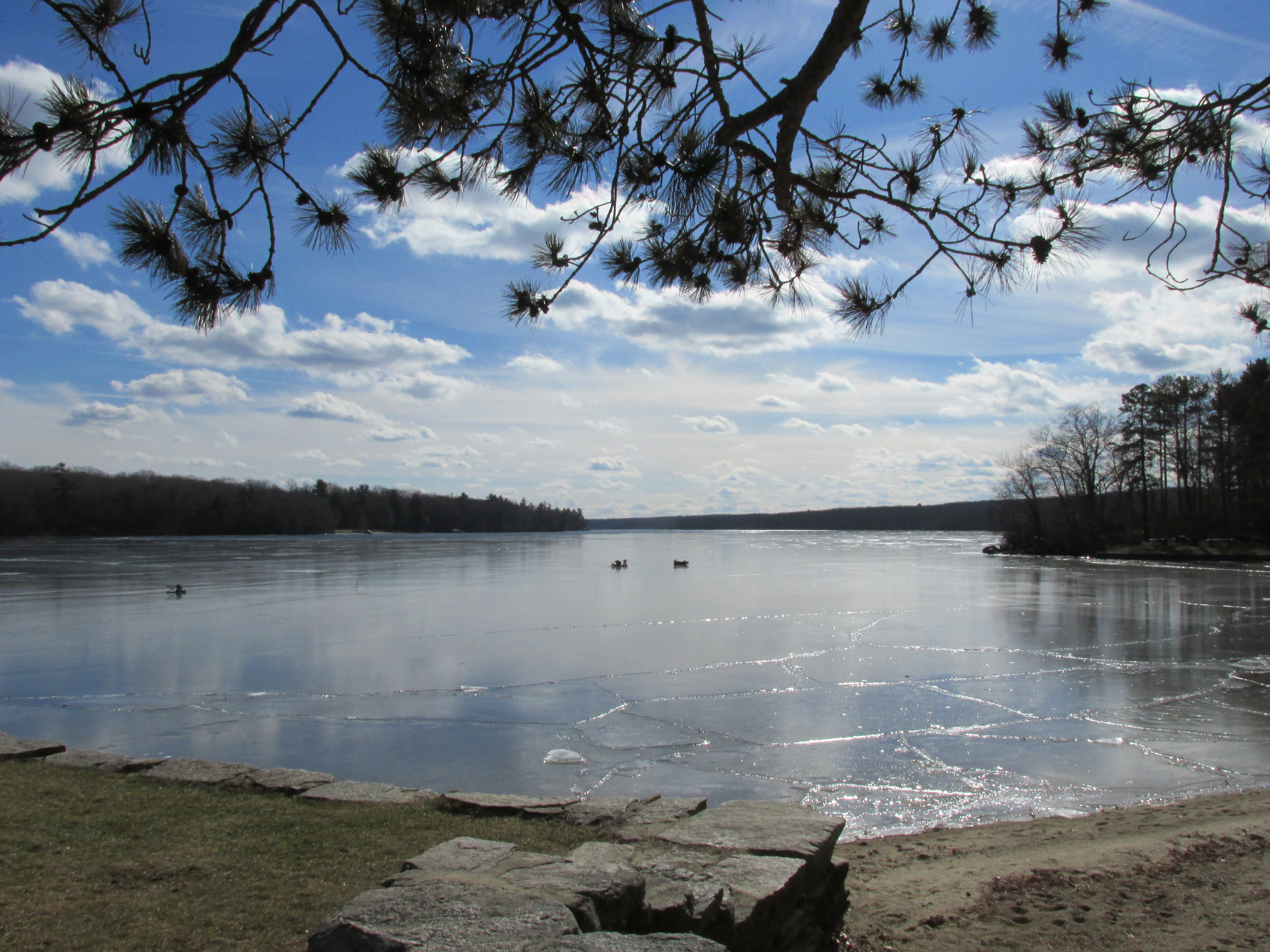
- Wallum Lake

- Location within Massachusetts Location within the United States
- Location: Douglas, Massachusetts, United States
- Coordinates: 42°02′45″N 71°47′25″W
- Area: 5,525 acres (2,236 ha)
- Elevation: 663 ft (202 m)
- Established: 1934
- Administrator: Massachusetts Department of Conservation and Recreation
- Website: Official website

Douglas State Forest is a publicly owned forest with recreational features located in the town of Douglas, Massachusetts, bordering both Connecticut and Rhode Island. The state forest's 5,525 acres (2,236 ha) include Wallum Lake and a rare Atlantic white cedar swamp, 5 acres (2.0 ha) of which are designated as a Massachusetts Wildland. The forest is managed by the Massachusetts Department of Conservation and Recreation.

== History ==
The state forest was created through the state's purchase of 1,245 acres (504 ha) in 1934. In the 1930s, the Civilian Conservation Corps installed major improvements including a picnic pavilion, an administrative building, and water management infrastructure.

== Activities and amenities ==
Forest trails are used for hiking, biking, horseback riding, and cross-country skiing. A 7.8-mile (12.6 km) section of the 92-mile-long (148 km) Midstate Trail runs through the forest as does a portion of the 22-mile-long (35 km) Southern New England Trunkline Trail. At the southwest extreme of the park, the tri-state marker, where Connecticut, Massachusetts and Rhode Island are conjoined, may be reached by a short offshoot of the Mid-State Trail.

Wallum Lake offers fishing, swimming, and boating. The forest also offers picnicking, restricted hunting, and a group day-use area.
