= Massachusetts House of Representatives' 9th Worcester district =

American legislative district

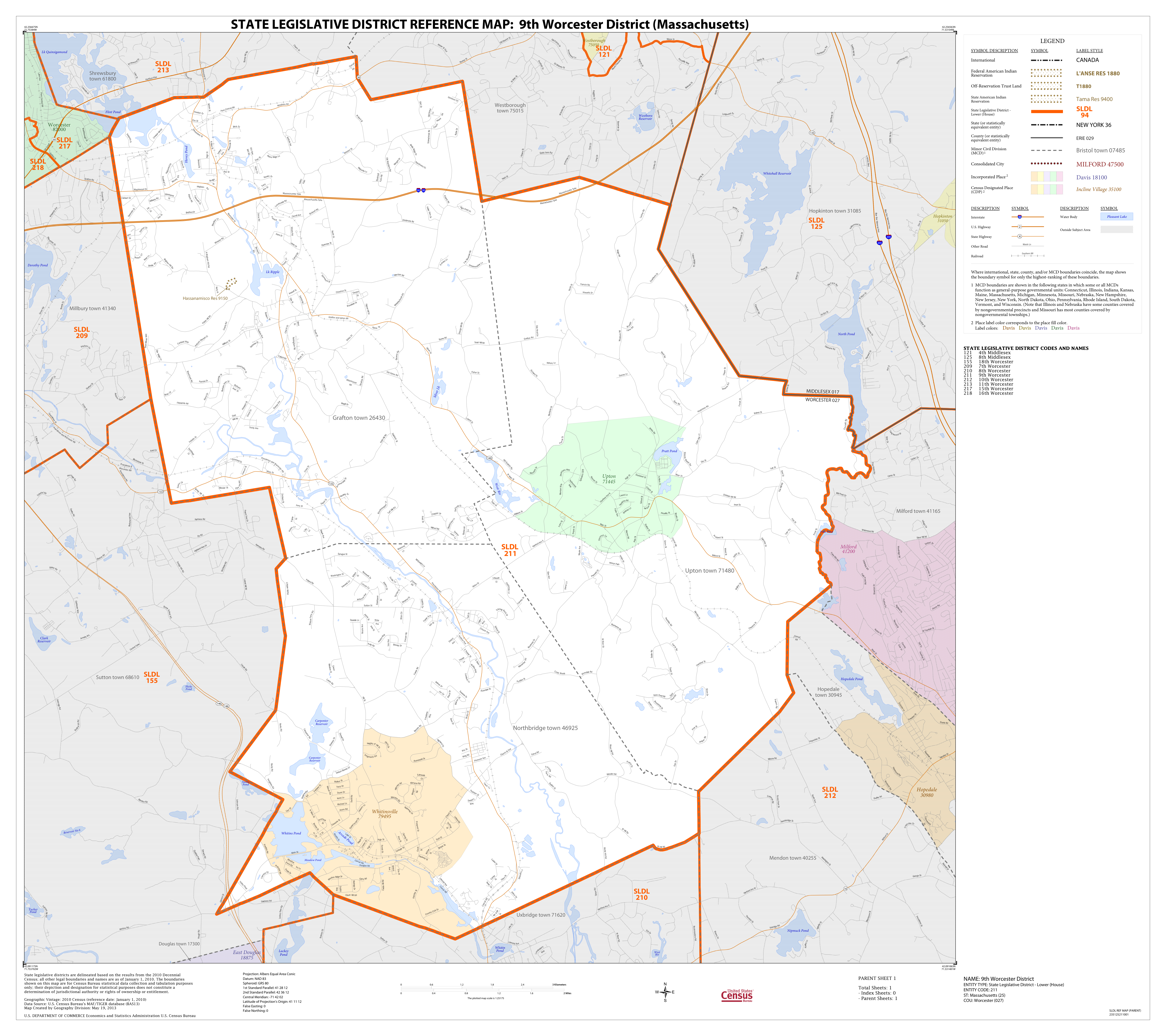
Map of Massachusetts House of Representatives' 9th Worcester district, based on the 2010 United States census.

Massachusetts House of Representatives' 9th Worcester district in the United States is one of 160 legislative districts included in the lower house of the Massachusetts General Court. It covers part of Worcester County. Republican David Muradian of Grafton has represented the district since 2015.

== Towns represented ==
The district includes the following localities:

- Grafton
- Northbridge
- Upton

The current district geographic boundary overlaps with those of the Massachusetts Senate's 2nd Worcester district and Worcester and Norfolk district.

=== Former locales ===
The district previously covered:

- Holden, circa 1872
- Oakham, circa 1872
- Princeton, circa 1872
- Rutland, circa 1872

== Representatives ==
- James Allen, circa 1858
- Solon S. Hastings, circa 1859
- John J. Allen, circa 1888
- Charles Waite Gould, circa 1920
- Jeremiah P. Keating, circa 1920
- William P. Di Vitto, circa 1951
- Maurice Edward Fitzgerald, circa 1951
- John R. Driscoll, circa 1975
- Marsha Platt, 1993-1995
- George N. Peterson Jr.
- David K. Muradian, Jr, 2015-current

== See also ==
- List of Massachusetts House of Representatives elections
- Other Worcester County districts of the Massachusetts House of Representatives: 1st, 2nd, 3rd, 4th, 5th, 6th, 7th, 8th, 10th, 11th, 12th, 13th, 14th, 15th, 16th, 17th, 18th
- Worcester County districts of the Massachusett Senate: 1st, 2nd; Hampshire, Franklin and Worcester; Middlesex and Worcester; Worcester, Hampden, Hampshire and Middlesex; Worcester and Middlesex; Worcester and Norfolk
- List of Massachusetts General Courts
- List of former districts of the Massachusetts House of Representatives
