= George N. Peterson Jr. =

American politician

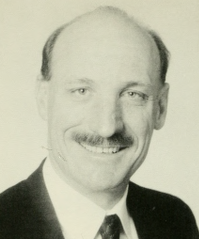
- Portrait of George N. Peterson Jr.

Member of the Massachusetts House of Representatives from the 9th Worcester district
- In office 1995 – January 7, 2015
- Preceded by: Marsha Platt
- Succeeded by: David Muradian

Personal details
- Born: July 8, 1950 (age 76) Worcester, Massachusetts
- Party: Republican

George N. Peterson Jr. (born July 8, 1950) is an American politician who served as a Republican member of the Massachusetts House of Representatives from 1995 to 2015. Representing the 9th Worcester district, he went on to serve as the House minority whip and later as the assistant minority leader before becoming commissioner of the Massachusetts Department of Fish & Game.

== Early life and education ==
Peterson was raised in Grafton, Massachusetts. He attended Grafton Memorial Senior High School, followed by the UMass Amherst Stockbridge School of Agriculture.

== Political career ==
Peterson first became involved in politics through his election in 1984 to the Grafton Planning Board. Soon after, he was elected to the Board of Selectmen, a position in which he served for five years. In 1994 Peterson was elected to represent the 9th Worcester district, consisting of Grafton, Northbridge and Upton, as well as parts of Westborough. He has served on the Rules and Natural Resources and Agriculture committees, and had a seat on the Joint Committee on Higher Education.

Peterson retired in January 2015 upon the completion of his term.
