= Wallum Lake =

Lake in the U.S. states of Rhode Island and Massachusetts

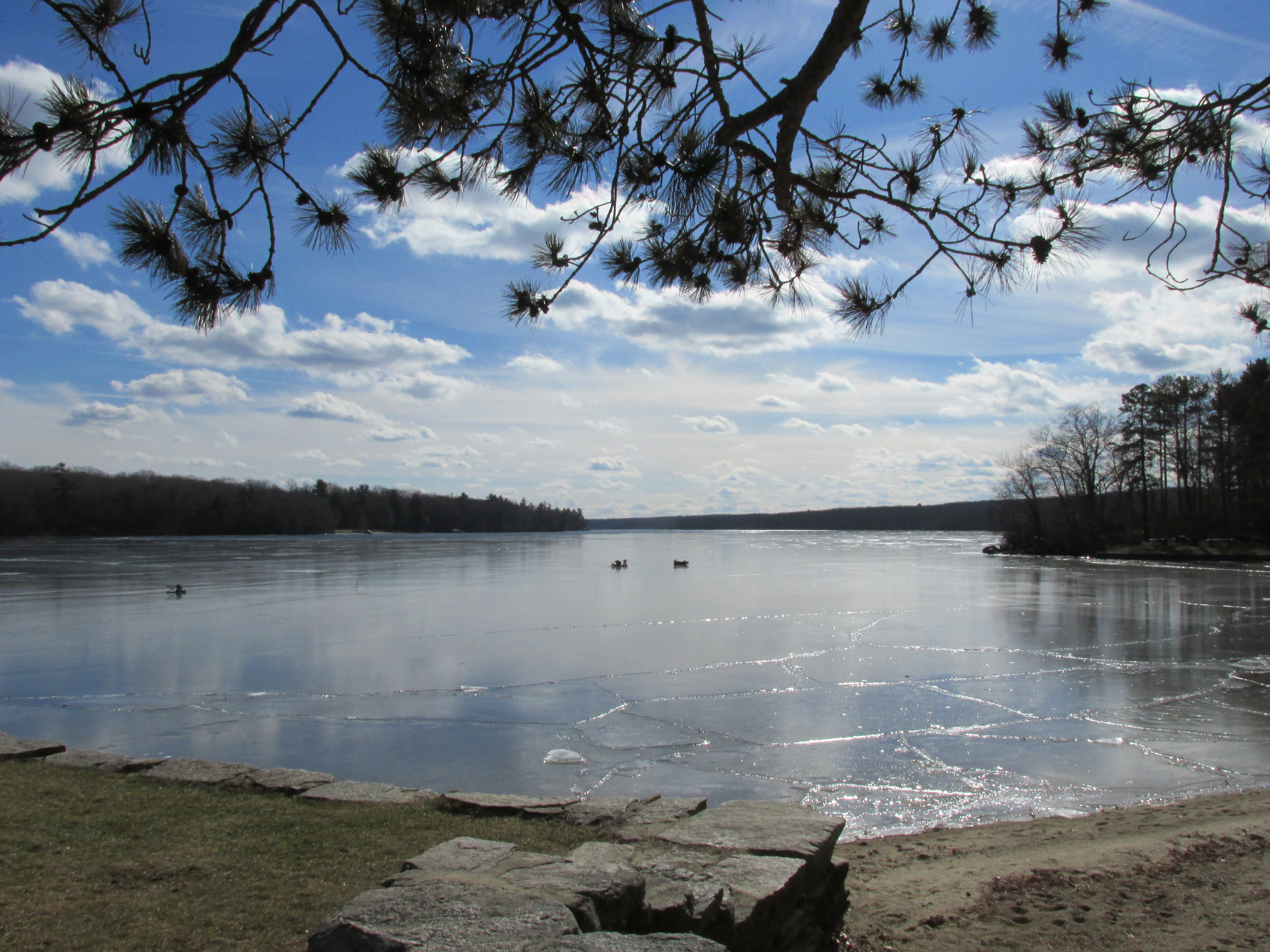
- Wallum Lake

- Location within Rhode Island
- Location: Providence County, Rhode Island / Worcester County, Massachusetts, United States
- Coordinates: 42.0087089°N 71.768403°W
- Basin countries: United States
- Surface area: 322 acres (1.30 km^{2})
- Max. depth: 74 ft (23 m)
- Surface elevation: 178 m (584 ft)

Wallum Lake is a 322-acre (1.30 km^{2}) lake that lies in Burrillville, Providence County, Rhode Island and Douglas, Worcester County, Massachusetts. It is adjacent to Douglas State Forest and Wallum Lake Park.

There are two paved boat ramps: one at the north end off Wallum Lake Road, Douglas, Massachusetts, the second at the southern extreme in Burrillville, Rhode Island. A study reported ten species of fish, based upon a 1994 summer sampling. Largemouth bass, yellow perch and bluegills are common. Additional species present included pumpkinseed, chain pickerel, landlocked alewife, brood salmon and eels. Licenses from either state are valid, but Rhode Island regulations apply.

Wallum Lake has been stocked with rainbow trout and brown trout. Rainbow trout are stocked on a put-and-take basis, and the state of Rhode Island has stocked numerous landlocked salmon and occasionally broodstock salmon.
