= George Platt =

George Platt may refer to:

- George Platt (politician) (1774–1818), blacksmith and political figure in Lower Canada
- George Crawford Platt (1842–1912), Medal of Honor recipient in the American Civil War
- George Foster Platt (1866–1928), stage actor and director
- George Platt (cricketer) (1881–1955), English cricketer
