= David Muradian =

American politician

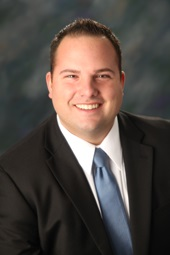

Member of the Massachusetts House of Representatives from the 9th Worcester district
- Incumbent
- Assumed office January 7, 2015
- Preceded by: George N. Peterson Jr.

Personal details
- Born: David K. Muradian Jr. November 21, 1982 (age 43) Blackstone Valley, Massachusetts, United States
- Party: Republican
- Education: Worcester State University

David K. Muradian Jr. (born November 21, 1982, in Blackstone Valley) is an American politician, who currently services as a member of the Massachusetts House of Representatives.

== Early life and education ==
Muradian was born and raised in the Blackstone Valley of Massachusetts. He attended Sutton High School, and played on their baseball and basketball teams. In 2005, Muradian received a Bachelor of Arts from Worcester State University, where he majored in communications and minored in history.

== Political career ==
In 2007, Muradian began his career as a legislative aide to George N. Peterson Jr. until 2014. On January 7, 2015, Muradian was elected to succeed Peterson to represent the Massachusetts House of Representatives' 9th Worcester district, and was reelected on November 3, 2020, 2022 and 2024 respectively. His current term is scheduled to end on January 4, 2027.

Muradian serves on several committees for the Commonwealth of Massachusetts including: Economic Development and Emerging Technologies; Global Warming and Climate Change; Housing; and Operations, Facilities, and Security.

== Personal life ==
Muradian resides in Grafton, Massachusetts.

== See also ==
- 2019–2020 Massachusetts legislature
- 2021–2022 Massachusetts legislature
