= Mark Platts =

Mark Platts may refer to:

- Mark Platts (footballer) (born 1979), English football midfielder
- Mark de Bretton Platts (born 1947), moral philosopher

== See also ==
- Marc Platt (disambiguation)
