= Robert Platt =

Robert Platt may refer to:

- Robert Platt, Baron Platt (1900–1978), British physician
- Robert Platt (canoeist) (1952–2014), French slalom canoeist
- Robert Platt (philanthropist) (1802–1882), English cotton manufacturer and philanthropist
- Robert Paus Platt (1905–1946), British diplomat
- Bob Platt (born 1932), English cricketer
- Robert Platt Jr., American robotics researcher
