= Old Douglas Center Historic District =

Historic district in Massachusetts, United States

- U.S. National Register of Historic Places
- U.S. Historic district
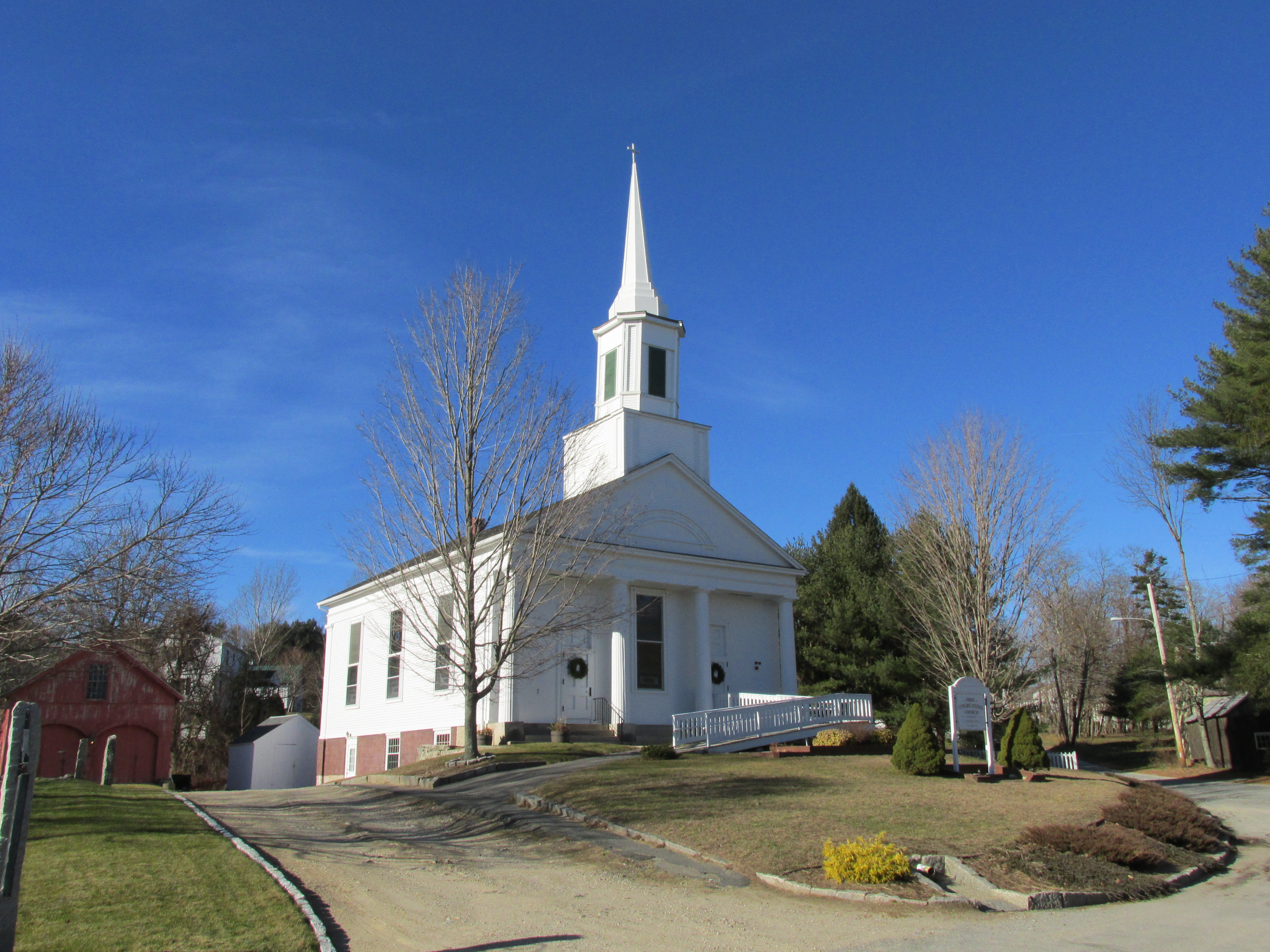
- First Congregational Church

- Location within Massachusetts Location within the United States
- Location: Douglas, Massachusetts
- Coordinates: 42°3′15.0″N 71°44′20.8″W
- Area: 192 acres (78 ha)
- Architect: Dudley, Paul A.; Dudley, Walter J.H., et al.
- Architectural style: Federal, Greek Revival
- NRHP reference No.: 01001186
- Added to NRHP: October 28, 2001

The Old Douglas Center Historic District encompasses the historic heart of Douglas, Massachusetts. The historic district radiates away from the town common, and is bounded by farmlands and more recent 20th-century development. There are 50 contributing resources in the 192-acre (78 ha) district. Most of the structures are residential houses in Federal and Greek Revival styles. There are a number of institutional buildings, including the 1834 Greek Revival First Congregational Church, the Craftsman-style Douglas Pastime Club building at 22 Church Street, and the c. 1770s Dudley Tavern. The town common and the adjacent Center Cemetery, laid out when the town was incorporated in 1746, are at the center of the district.

== History ==
Douglas was established in the 1730s on land set off from Sherborn, and incorporated in 1746. The town common quickly became the focus of civic activity, and roads were laid out from surrounding towns to that area. A meeting house (parts reused in building the house at 1 SE Main Street) was built in 1747, and the surviving tavern was built in the 1770s. The importance of the center as a nexus of economic activity declined in the 19th century, as industrial activity grew along the Mumford River in East Douglas, which also benefited from the arrival of the railroad. Construction was modest in the center in the second half of the 19th century, with only two new houses built.

In the early 20th century, a few institutional buildings were added. In addition to the Douglas Pastime Club, and the 1921 two-room Douglas Center School, Colonial Revival houses were built at 8 and 16 Church Street, and a 1 Main Street. The church's steeple was damaged by the New England Hurricane of 1938 and rebuilt.

The district listed on the National Register of Historic Places in 2001.

== See also ==
- National Register of Historic Places listings in Worcester County, Massachusetts
