= John R. Driscoll =

American politician

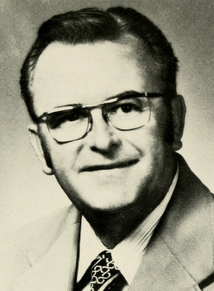

Member of the Massachusetts House of Representatives from the 9th Worcester district
- In office 1975–1993
- Preceded by: Louis Bertonazzi
- Succeeded by: Marsha Platt

Personal details
- Born: May 9, 1924 Whitinsville, Massachusetts, U.S.
- Died: July 10, 2014 (aged 90) Belmont, Massachusetts, U.S.
- Party: Republican
- Education: College of the Holy Cross (BA)
- Occupation: Life insurance agent State representative

John Riley "Jack" Driscoll (May 9, 1924 – July 10, 2014) was an American politician and businessman.

== Early life and education ==
Driscoll was born on May 9, 1924, in Whitinsville, Massachusetts, an unincorporated village in Northbridge, Massachusetts. He served in the United States Army Air Forces during World War II. In 1948, he graduated with his bachelor's degree from the College of the Holy Cross in Worcester, Massachusetts.

== Career ==
Driscoll worked a sales representative for Metropolitan Life Insurance for 31 years.

Driscoll was prompted to run for a seat in the Massachusetts House of Representatives after hearing Speaker David M. Bartley comment that House leadership had to overcome the inability of state representatives to make decisions. He first ran in 1974, a year Republicans were not expected to win due to the Watergate scandal, however he was elected by 452 votes.

During his tenure in the House, Driscoll rarely sponsored legislation, but instead worked behind the scenes. He forged strong ties within his district through his constituent work and was considered by local Democrats to be unbeatable. In 1992, he chose not to run for reelection.

Driscoll died on July 10, 2014, in Belmont, Massachusetts.
