= Sutton High School (Massachusetts) =

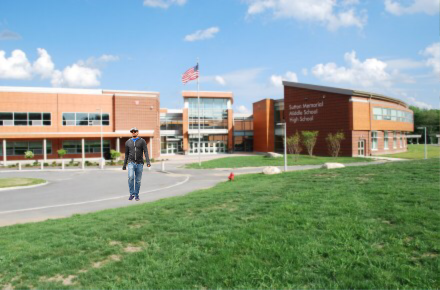
- Rendering of Sutton High School from 2016.

Location
- 383 Boston Road; Sutton, Massachusetts 01590; United States; 42°8′40.4″N 71°46′15.9″W

Information
- Type: Public
- Established: 1835
- School district: Sutton School District
- Superintendent: Caitlin Paget
- Principal: Matthew Urquhart
- Teaching staff: 29.75 (FTE)
- Grades: 9–12
- Enrollment: 363 (2023–2024)
- Student to teacher ratio: 12.20
- Colors: Kelly green and white
- Athletics conference: Central Massachusetts Athletic Conference
- Nickname: Sammies (boys) and Suzies (girls)
- Rival: Douglas High School
- Newspaper: Sutton High News
- Yearbook: Exitus
- Website: www.suttonschools.net

Sutton High School is a public high school located in Sutton, Massachusetts. The school shares its location with Sutton Middle School on a nearly 64-acre campus.

== History ==
According to A History of the Town of Sutton, Massachusetts, written by William Addison Benedict and Hiram Averill Tracy in 1878, Reverend George Anson Willard established Sutton High School in 1835.

Between 2011 and 2015, major renovations took place to the existing school building by the Boston-based architecture firm Flansburgh Architects.

The yearbook of Sutton High is known as the Exitus, and is known to have been published as far back as 1938. The school's student newspaper is known as Sutton High News.

== Athletics ==
Sutton High School athletic teams are known as the Sammies (boys) and Suzies (girls). The teams compete in District 2 of the Massachusetts Interscholastic Athletic Association (MIAA), specifically within the Central Massachusetts Athletic Conference (CMAC). Competitors include: Blackstone-Millville Regional High School, Douglas High School, Hopedale Junior Senior High School, Nipmuc Regional High School, and Whitinsville Christian School. However, in the past, competition was done in the Dual-Valley Conference (DVC).

== Athletic state championships ==
Sutton athletics is most known for their soccer program, with a total of 19 state championships across boys' and girls' soccer. Sutton's girls' soccer team has the most soccer state championships in the entire state of Massachusetts, with a total of 13.

Note: Some state championships from the 2024-2025 school year may not be included because some of the MIAA state championship archives haven't been updated.

| Sport | Year(s) |
MIAA sanctioned sports
| Girls' soccer (13) | 1991, 1992, 1993, 1995, 1997, 2001, 2004, 2013, 2017, 2021, 2022, 2023, 2024 |
| Boys' soccer (6) | 2002, 2011, 2012, 2013, 2014, 2024 |
| Girls' basketball (1) | 2020 |
Other sports & Co-op's
| Girls' track (middle school) (4) | 2012, 2015, 2016, 2018 |
| Boys' track (middle school) (2) | 2012, 2017 |
| Esports (3) | Spring 2024, Fall 2024, Spring 2025 |

The school offers: baseball, basketball, cross country, field hockey, football, golf, soccer, softball, tennis, track and field, and volleyball.

== Department of Education Visit ==
In early 2026, Sutton Public Schools were chosen as part of The US Department of Education's “History Rocks! Trail to Independence” tour. Secretary Linda McMahon was intended to visit as part of this event, possibly sitting in on classes, and maybe leading a pep rally. However, due to complications, the event was indefinitely postponed.

== Notable alumni ==
- Ryan Fattman, member of the Massachusetts Senate
- David Muradian, member of the Massachusetts House of Representatives

== See also ==
- List of high schools in Massachusetts
