= Michael Platt =

Mike or Michael Platt may refer to:

- Michael B. Platt (1948–2019), American artist
- Michael Lee Platt (1954–1986), robbery suspect
- Michael Platt (financier) (born 1968), financier
- Michael Platt Jr. (born 1974), public official
- Michael Platt (rugby league) (born 1984), Ireland international rugby league player
- Mike Platt, contestant on The Voice UK (series 8)
