= David Platt (disambiguation) =

David Platt (born 1966) is an English former footballer

David Platt may refer to:

- David Platt (Coronation Street), fictional character in the British soap opera Coronation Street
- David Platt (darts player) (born 1967), Australian darts player
- David Platt (director), American film and television director
- David Platt (pastor) (born 1978), American pastor
