= Ben Platt (disambiguation) =

Ben Platt (born 1993) is an American film and stage actor.

Ben Platt may also refer to:

- Ben Platt (cricketer) (born 1980), Welsh cricketer
- Benjamin Platt (1883–1960), American businessman and philanthropist
