= Virginia Bever Platt =

American historian (1912–2009)

- Virginia Bever (later Platt), from the 1930 yearbook of the University of Washington
- Born: December 11, 1912; Bellingham, Washington, U.S.
- Died: January 15, 2009 (age 96); Cleveland, Ohio, U.S.
- Occupations: Historian, college professor

Virginia Bever Platt (December 11, 1912 – January 15, 2009) was an American historian and college professor. She was a professor at Bowling Green State University from 1947 to 1975.

== Early life and education ==
Bever was born in Bellingham, Washington, the daughter of James Bever and Virginia Greene Bever. Her father was the academic dean at Western Washington College. Her younger brother James E. Bever taught geology at Miami University in Ohio. She graduated from Whatcom High School at age 14, and earned a bachelor's degree from the University of Washington in 1929. She earned a master's degree at the University of California, Berkeley in 1936, and completed doctoral studies at the University of Iowa. She was a member of Alpha Chi Omega.

== Career ==
Platt taught at Western Washington College from 1936 to 1939, and at the University of Iowa from 1939 to 1940. She and her husband were both history professors at Bowling Green State University (BGSU) from 1947 until they both retired in 1975. One of her undergraduate students was historian Stanley Kutler, who recalled her as an important influence.

In 1984 she was appointed to the university's board of trustees, where she was seen as a "contrarian". "I don't have a job to lose, I don't have family to worry about. When you have that kind of security, I think it's your moral obligation to do what's the right thing to do", she explained in 1987. She was the first woman president of the Ohio Academy of History, and was president of the Ohio-Indiana chapter of the American Studies Association. She spoke to community groups about historical topics.

== Publications ==
- "Some Observations on European Student Unrest" (1969)
- "The East India Company and the Madagascar Slave Trade" (1969)
- Of Mother Country and Plantations: Proceedings of the Twenty-Seventh Conference in Early American History (1971, edited with David Curtis Skaggs)
- "Tar, Staves, and New England Rum: The Trade of Aaron Lopez of Newport, Rhode Island, with Colonial North Carolina" (1971)
- "Triangles and Tramping: Captain Zebediah Story of Newport, 1769–1776" (1973)
- "'And Don't Forget the Guinea Voyage': The Slave Trade of Aaron Lopez of Newport" (1975)

== Personal life ==
Virginia Bever married a fellow historian, Grover Cleveland Platt, in 1941. They had daughters Carolyn and Phyllis. Her husband died in 1982. Platt had Alzheimer's disease before she died in 2009, at the age of 96, in Cleveland, Ohio. There is a Grover and Virginia Platt Memorial Scholarship Fund at BGSU, for undergraduates majoring in history.
