= Chester Platt =

American inventor (1857–1934)

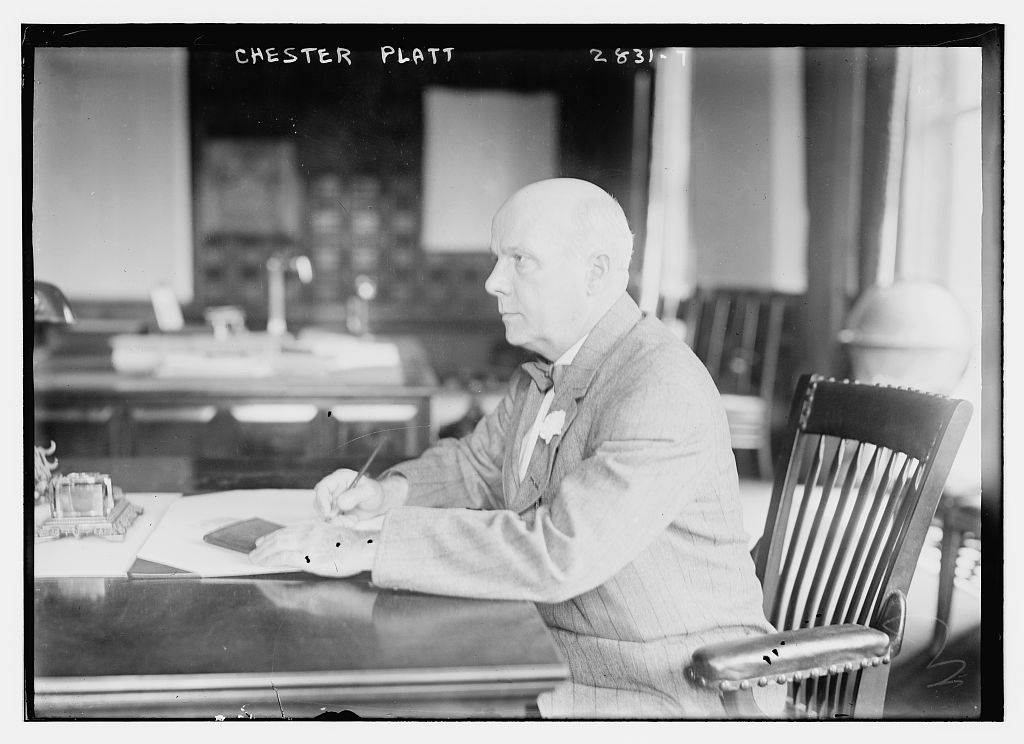
- Platt, c. 1910–1915
- Born: Chester Childs Platt; October 30, 1857; Somers, New York, U.S.
- Died: May 3, 1934 (aged 76); St. Petersburg, Florida
- Resting place: Lake View Cemetery; Ithaca, New York, U.S.
- Education: Cornell University
- Occupations: Publisher; editor; businessman
- Known for: inventing the ice cream sundae
- Political party: Democratic
- Spouse: Minnie F. Brown (m. 1880)
- Children: 2

Chester Childs Platt (October 30, 1857 – May 3, 1934) was a newspaper publisher and drugstore operator in Ithaca, New York, who was credited with the invention of the ice cream sundae. He also published papers in Batavia, New York, and Madison, Wisconsin.

== Early life ==
Chester Childs Platt was born on October 30, 1857, in Somers, New York, to Mary (née Childs) and William K. Platt. His father was a minister. He spent most of his youth in Ludlowville, New York. He attended Cornell University and was a member of Alpha Tau Omega.

== Career ==
At the age of 18, Platt began conducting business. He had a drug store in Ludlowville. He sold the drug store and a hardware business he owned around 1885. He was then a salesman for a New York wholesale firm. In 1884, he moved to Ithaca, New York. In Ithaca, he purchased the O. D. Curran Drug Store and went into business with Park Colt and renamed the firm Platt & Colt. He continued the business until 1900. At the store, he is credited with inventing the ice cream sundae.

In 1888, Platt took an active role in the tariff reform campaign alongside the Reform Club of New York. From 1899 to 1900, he was city clerk of Ithaca. He was secretary of the Democratic Committee of Tompkins County for years and served as chairman of the committee during the first term of Woodrow Wilson. He was a Democrat and ran once for mayor of Ithaca, New York, in 1891.

After city clerk, Platt became owner, publisher and editor of the Ithaca Democrat. He published the paper until April 1903 when he moved to Batavia, New York. He became editor of Batavia Times and after a few months succeeded D. D. Lent as the owner and president. He advocated and wrote in support on government ownership of utilities and advocated for direct primary elections for nominations. In Batavia, he supported the eight-hour day movement and the full crew bill on railroad engines. In 1908 or 1909, he was the Democratic candidate for the New York Assembly to represent Genesee County.

Platt was a supporter of William Jennings Bryan and organized labor. He also supported the women suffrage movement. He was national secretary of the Nonpartisan League and served as private secretary to Governor William Sulzer from 1912 to 1913. He gave lectures on liberal topics to the Harvard Liberal Club, Hunter College's history club, Union Theological Seminary's contemporary club, Vassar college's political association, Rann School and the Brookwood Labor College.

Platt moved to Madison, Wisconsin, in 1913. He was co-editor of the Capital City Times in Madison. He served as member of the Wisconsin Non Partisan League for a year. He was associated with the National Student Forum in Wisconsin. He also published a weekly political column called "Human Behavior". The column was published weekly in the Capital Times. He wrote books on political and economic topics, including the book What La Follette's State is Doing. In 1917, he moved back to Ithaca. He was elected general manager and vice president of Forest City Publishing Company, the publisher of The Ithaca Daily News. He served as editor of the paper.

Platt was vice president of the Open Air Forum in Williams Park in St. Petersburg, Florida. He became a fraternal delegate of the St. Petersburg Central Labor Union around 1926. He was a regular attendee of the Florida Federation of Labor Convention and a friend of American Federation of Labor leader William Green. He supported Republican Robert M. La Follette in the 1924 presidential election and led a delegation in support to the 1924 Republican National Convention in Cleveland. He was a founding member of the Ithaca Business Men's Association and the DeWitt Historical Society of Ithaca. He was also a member of the New York State Democratic Editorial Association, the Western New York Newspaper Publishers' Association and the Holland Club.

== Personal life ==
Platt married Mary "Minnie" F. Brown on August 23, 1880. They had two sons, Chester C. Jr. and Hugh Malcolm. They had a summer home in Rye, New York. He vacationed in the winters at St. Petersburg, Florida, starting around 1925. He was a member of the board of trustees of the United Liberal Church of St. Petersburg. He served as president of the church's men's club. He was a trustee of the Unitarian Church in Ithaca. He traveled frequently to Europe to support his political articles.

Platt died of pneumonia on May 3, 1934, at Mound Park Hospital in St. Petersburg. He was buried in Lake View Cemetery in Ithaca.
