= Marc Platt =

Marc Platt may refer to:

- Marc Platt (dancer) (1913–2014), American ballet dancer, musical theatre performer, and actor
- Marc Platt (producer) (born 1957), American film and theater producer
- Marc Platt (writer) (born 1953), British novelist and playwright

== See also ==
- Mark Platt (born 1973), Canadian rower
- Mark Platts (disambiguation)
