= George Platt (cricketer) =

English cricketer (1881–1955)

George John William Platt (9 June 1881 – 14 April 1955) was an English first-class cricketer active 1906–27 who played for Surrey. He was born in Richmond-upon-Thames; died in Old Hill, Staffordshire.
