= Thomas Platt =

Thomas Platt may refer to:

- Thomas C. Platt (1833–1910), US senator from New York
- Thomas Collier Platt Jr. (1925–2017), United States federal judge in New York
- Sir Thomas Joshua Platt (c. 1789–1862), British judge
- Thomas Pell Platt (1798–1852), English orientalist
- Tom Platt (born 1993), English footballer
