= Spencer Platt =

Spencer Platt may refer to:

- Spencer Platt (photographer) (born 1970), American photographer
- Spencer Platt (cricketer) (born 1974), English cricketer
