= Douglas High School (Massachusetts) =

Coordinates: 42.0674°N 71.7002°W

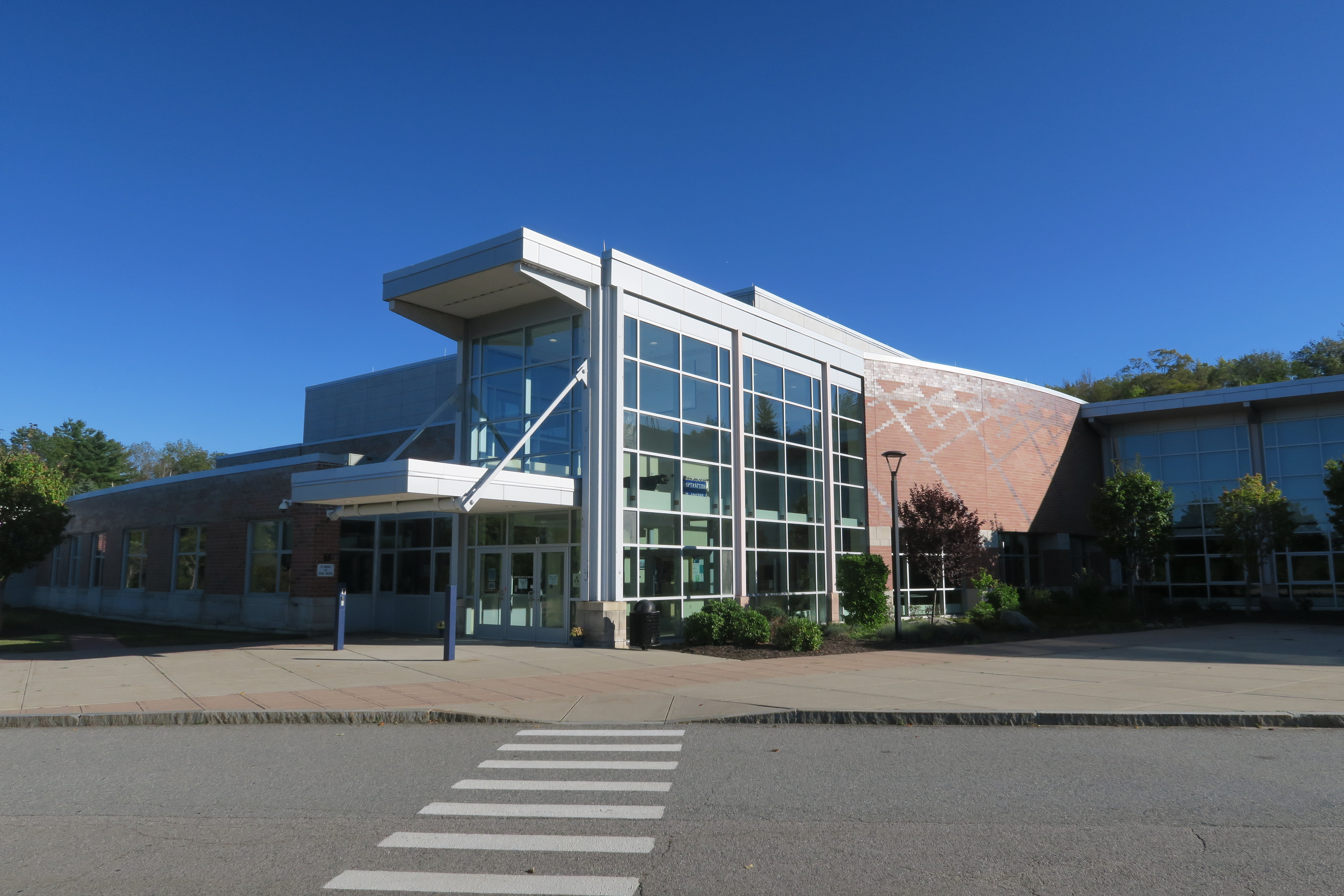
- Douglas High School
- 33 Davis Street; Douglas, MA 01516; United States

Information
- Type: Public High School; Open enrollment
- School district: Douglas Public Schools
- Principal: Robert Ringuette
- Teaching staff: 33.8 (FTE)
- Grades: 9-12
- Enrollment: 258 (2025-2026)
- Colors: Blue and White
- Athletics conference: Central Massachusetts Athletic Conference
- Mascot: Tiger
- Team name: Douglas Tigers
- Accreditation: New England Association of Schools and Colleges
- Website: Douglas High School

Douglas High School is a public high school in Douglas, Massachusetts, United States. In the 2025-2026 school year, it served 258 students in grades 9-12 in the Douglas School District.

== Demographics ==
According to Massachusetts Department of Elementary and Secondary Education annual statistics, for the 2025-2026 academic year, the demographic enrollment distributions for race, gender and grade level at Douglas High School (Massachusetts) are as follows:

Total number of enrolled students: 258
Total number of full-time equivalent educators: 33.8
Therefore, the student to teacher ratio for this school is 7.6:1

Enrollment by Race/Ethnicity (2025-2026)
Race	Enrolled Pupils*	% of District
African American	3	1.2%
Asian	2	0.8%
Hispanic	29	11.2%
Native American	0	0.0%
White	220	85.3%
Native Hawaiian, Pacific Islander	0	0.0%
Multi-Race, Non-Hispanic	4	1.6%
Total	258	100%

* Approximate number of enrolled pupils is calculated based on total number of students in district, multiplied by reported percentage, and rounded to nearest whole student.

Enrollment by gender (2025-2026)
Gender	Enrolled pupils	Percentage
Female	128	49.61%
Male	130	50.39%
Non-binary	0	0%
Total	258	100%

Enrollment by Grade
Grade	Pupils Enrolled	Percentage
9	65	25.19%
10	60	23.26%
11	59	22.87%
12	72	27.91%
SP*	2	0.78%
Total	258	100%

* SP = Special Education Beyond Grade 12

== Advanced placement testing ==
Douglas High School offers Advanced Placement (AP) courses to its students. According to data from U.S. News & World Report, in 2024, 41% of Douglas High School students participated in at least one AP exam. 33% of students passed at least one AP exam.

== Athletics ==
Douglas High School is part of the Central Massachusetts Athletic Conference.

Students at Douglas High School compete in a variety of athletics, including golf, soccer, volleyball, cross country, cheerleading, indoor track and field, basketball, softball, baseball, and outdoor track and field. Douglas also participates in a football co-op with Sutton, a boys' hockey with Hopedale, a girls' hockey co-op with Auburn, and a field hockey co-op with Blackstone Millville.

== See also ==
- List of high schools in Massachusetts
