= Marsha Platt =

American politician

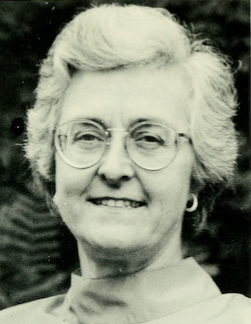

Member of the Massachusetts House of Representatives
- Preceded by: John R. Driscoll
- Succeeded by: George N. Peterson Jr.

Marsha Platt is an American Democratic politician from North Grafton, Massachusetts. She represented the 9th Worcester district in the Massachusetts House of Representatives from 1993 to 1995.

== See also ==
- 1993-1994 Massachusetts legislature
