= Robert Platt Jr. =

American robotics researcher

Robert Platt
- Education: University of Massachusetts Amherst (PhD)
- Known for: Robonaut 2, robotic manipulation, grasp detection
- Awards: NSF CAREER Award (2018)
- Scientific career
- Fields: Robotics, Computer science, Machine learning
- Workplaces: Northeastern University; Massachusetts Institute of Technology; NASA Johnson Space Center; University at Buffalo
- Website: www.ccs.neu.edu/home/rplatt/

Robert Platt Jr. is an American robotics researcher and Associate Professor at Northeastern University's Khoury College of Computer Sciences. His work focuses on robotic manipulation and machine learning, and he contributed to the Robonaut 2 project at NASA, which resulted in the first humanoid robot deployed on the International Space Station.

== Education ==
Platt earned his Ph.D. in Computer Science from the University of Massachusetts Amherst. His doctoral research focused on robot grasping and manipulation under uncertainty, developing novel approaches to managing the partially observable nature of robotic grasping problems using fingertip force sensors.

== Career ==
Before entering academia, Platt worked as a robotics engineer at NASA's Johnson Space Center in Houston, Texas. He served as the technical lead for control and autonomy on the Robonaut 2 project, a collaboration between NASA and General Motors to develop a next-generation dexterous humanoid robot. Robonaut 2 became the first humanoid robot in space when it was delivered to the International Space Station aboard Space Shuttle Discovery on STS-133 in February 2011.

At NASA, Platt developed strategies for using Bayesian filtering to localize buttons or grommets in flexible materials using touch sensors, work that was conducted jointly with General Motors. His work on robotic hand control also resulted in a patent for joint-space impedance control for tendon-driven manipulators, jointly assigned to NASA and GM. This research addressed ergonomically challenging tasks in manufacturing that expose workers to repetitive motion injuries.

After leaving NASA, Platt worked as a research scientist at the Massachusetts Institute of Technology in the Computer Science and Artificial Intelligence Laboratory (CSAIL). He briefly held a position as Assistant Professor in the Computer Science and Engineering Department at the State University of New York at Buffalo before joining Northeastern University.

Platt is currently an Associate Professor in the Khoury College of Computer Sciences at Northeastern University, where he is also affiliated with the College of Engineering. He directs the Helping Hands Lab, which focuses on developing perception, planning, and control algorithms for robot manipulation in unstructured environments. He is also affiliated with the Institute for Experiential Robotics and serves as a Visiting Fellow at the Robotics and AI Institute.

== Research ==
Platt's research focuses on perception, planning, and control for robotic manipulation, with the goal of enabling robots to perform manipulation tasks despite real-world perceptual uncertainties. His work addresses fundamental challenges in robotic assembly, repair tasks, and object manipulation in everyday environments.

- Grasp detection and manipulation: Developing algorithms that enable robots to detect and execute grasps on novel objects in cluttered environments. His lab has achieved grasp success rates of 93% for novel objects in dense clutter.
- Belief space planning: Creating approaches to robot planning under uncertainty that perform well in continuous state, action, and observation spaces over long time horizons.
- Equivariant neural networks: Investigating the use of symmetry-preserving neural network architectures to improve sample efficiency in robot learning.
- Reinforcement learning for robotics: Developing methods for robots to learn manipulation tasks through trial and error in both simulated and real environments.
- Tactile sensing: Building robotic hands equipped with tactile sensors and developing algorithms for interpreting tactile data to enable precise manipulation.

== Publications ==
- "Robonaut 2 - The first humanoid robot in space" (2011) – documenting the development of the first humanoid robot deployed to the International Space Station
- "Grasp Pose Detection in Point Clouds" (2017) – a foundational work on detecting robotic grasps directly from sensor data
- "Belief space planning assuming maximum likelihood observations" (2010) – introducing a new approach to robot planning under uncertainty
- "Valkyrie: NASA's first bipedal humanoid robot" (2015) – describing NASA's bipedal humanoid robot developed for disaster response
- "Learning multi-level hierarchies with hindsight" (2017) – a widely cited contribution to hierarchical reinforcement learning

== Patents ==
- "Joint-space impedance control for tendon-driven manipulators" (U.S. Patent 8,060,250 B2, 2011) – a method for controlling tendon-driven robotic manipulators, developed as part of the Robonaut 2 project in collaboration with NASA and General Motors

== See also ==
- Robonaut
- International Space Station
- Robotic manipulation
- Human-robot interaction
