= Peter Platt (musician) =

Austrian composer and musician (born 1965)

Peter Platt (born 4 February 1965 in Vienna) is an Austrian performing musician and composer.

== Biography ==
At 6 years old, he entered at the Gänserndorf's music school and began to learn playing accordion and trumpet.

Later, he changed for tenor tuba and organ.

At 8 years old, he composed for the first time.

At 10 years old, he composed and published his first march. In 1979, he managed the entry exam of the Vienna music university in order to study trombone.

Then still playing trombone, he entered the Vienna's conservatory studying jazz where he obtained the mention of excellence in 2000 in jazz music theory, composing and musical arrangements.

In 2003, he was appointed IGP professor with the mention of excellence.

He won the recognition award in consideration for all his composition.

He became trombonist substitute in Vienna's opera orchestra on permanent basis.

He is the conductor of the Auersthal city orchestra since 1997, and the conductor substitute of Gänserndorf district.

He worked as music professor in Deutsch-Wagram, Strasshof, Gänserndorf, Dürnkrut and Auersthal.

Since 2005, he is the school principal of the school of music in Gänserndorf.

Until now, he had composed more than 530 musical works, mainly for harmonic orchestras and also for jazz band and big band.

== Works ==
- Tornado
- Symphonic Ouvertüre
- Hase und Adler
- Mr. X-Man
- Rhapsody of Fire
- Spirit of Europe
- Red Hot
- The Happiness of Music
- Starlight Ouvertüre
- Western-City
- Marcia España
- Mariandl Marsch
- Herzog Cumberland Marsch
- Mit frischem Schwung
- Jodelzwi
- Am Halterberg
- Fuhrmann Polka
- Scoubidou für Violine
- El Tanguista f. Gitarrenquartett
- Salmonellentänze f. Klarinettenquartett

== Links ==
- Website from Peter Platt
