= Obadiah H. Platt =

American pioneer (1806–1893)

Obadiah Henry Platt (March 20, 1806 – 1893) was a pioneer in the settlement of Tampa, Florida. The First Congregational Church at 2201 North Florida Avenue was dedicated to him in 1906 after the congregation moved from downtown Tampa.

Platt was born in Galway, New York and studied at Union College. He practiced law in New York and helped start the New-York Tribune. He moved to Vermont in 1847 and operated the Vermont Phoenix and later the Vermont Republican newspapers. He then moved to Saint Louis, Missouri and Hyde Park, Chicago before finally settling in Tampa. He named Hyde Park in Tampa after the place in Illinois.

Abraham Lincoln appointed Platt paymaster of the Union Army in 1861. Platt wrote to Lincoln in 1864, critical of his conciliatory policy.
