= Plat (disambiguation) =

A plat is a type of cadastral map.

Plat or Plats may also refer to:

- Plat, Rogaška Slatina, a settlement in the Rogaška Slatina municipality, Slovenia
- Plat, Mežica, a settlement in the Mežica municipality, Slovenia
- Plat, Croatia, a small resort town in Župa Dubrovačka, Croatia
- Tissue plasminogen activator (abbreviated PLAT), a protein involved in the breakdown of blood clots
- Vojtěch Plát (born 1994), Czech chess grandmaster
- Plats, Ardèche, France
- Plat, in gardening history, a plain grass section of a parterre
- Sir Hugh Plat (1552–1608), English writer

== See also ==
- Plait (disambiguation) (pronounced "plat"),
- Platt (disambiguation)
- Platen (disambiguation)
- Plate (disambiguation)
- Plot (disambiguation)
