= Platte =

Platte may refer to:

== Geography ==
=== United States ===
- Platte County (disambiguation)
- Platte Lake (disambiguation), also Lake Platte
- Platte River (disambiguation)
- Platte Township (disambiguation)

==== Colorado ====
- Platte Canyon, Colorado

==== Louisiana ====
- Ville Platte, Louisiana, a city

==== Minnesota ====
- Platte, Minnesota, an unincorporated community

==== Missouri ====
- Platte Brook North, Kansas City, a neighborhood
- Platte City, Missouri
- Platte Falls Conservation Area, protected land in Platte County, Missouri
- Platte Ridge, Kansas City, a neighborhood
- Platte Woods, Missouri, a city
- West Platte, Missouri, an extinct hamlet

==== Nebraska ====
- La Platte, Nebraska, a census-designated place
- North Platte, Nebraska, a city
- Platte Center, Nebraska, a village
- Platte River State Park

==== New York ====
- Platte Clove, a valley

==== South Dakota ====
- Platte, South Dakota, a city
- Platte Creek Recreation Area
- Platte Colony, South Dakota, a Census-designated place

==== Wisconsin ====
- Platteville, Wisconsin, a city

==== Wyoming ====
- Fort Platte, Wyoming, an 1840s stronghold and trading post
- Platte River Wilderness, protected forests in Wyoming and Colorado

=== Elsewhere ===
- Platte (Schneeberg), a peak in the Fichtel Mountains, Germany
- Platte (Steinwald), the highest mountain in the Steinwald, in the Fichtel Mountains, Germany
- Île Platte, an island in the Seychelles

== Other uses ==
- Platte (surname)
- Department of the Platte, a military administrative district from 1866 to 1898
- USS Platte (AO-24)
- USS Platte (AO-186)
- Platte Generating Station, a power plant in Grand Island, Nebraska
- Platte Institute for Economic Research, a think tank in Omaha, Nebraska
- Platte Media, successor to Micro Bill Systems Ltd.
- Platte (EP), by German rapper Apache 207

== See also ==
- Platte Purchase, an 1836 addition to the state of Missouri
- Plat
- Platt (disambiguation)
- Platts (disambiguation)
