= Platte River (disambiguation) =

The Platte River is a principal tributary of the Missouri River in the U.S. state of Nebraska.

The Platte River may also refer to:

== Waterways ==
- North Platte River, in Colorado, Nebraska, and Wyoming
- South Platte River, in Colorado and Nebraska
  - North Fork South Platte River, in Colorado
  - Middle Fork South Platte River, in Colorado
  - South Fork South Platte River, in Colorado
- Platte River (Iowa and Missouri), in Iowa and Missouri
  - West Platte River, in Iowa
  - Middle Platte River, in Iowa
    - East Platte River, in Iowa
    - East Branch Middle Platte River, in Iowa
  - Platte Branch, in Iowa and Missouri
  - Little Platte River, in Missouri
  - Third Fork Platte River, in Missouri
    - Little Third Fork Platte River, in Missouri
- Platte River (Michigan), in Michigan
- Platte River (Minnesota), in Minnesota
- Platte River (Wisconsin), in Wisconsin
  - Little Platte River, in Wisconsin

== Places ==
- Platte River, Michigan, an unincorporated community
- Platte River Campground Site, archaeological site in Michigan
- Platte River Crossing, in Wyoming
- Platte River State Park, in Nebraska
- Platte River Wilderness, in Colorado and Wyoming

== Infrastructure ==
- Great Platte River Road, in Nebraska and Wyoming
- Platte River Bridge, bridge in Colorado
- South Platte River Bridges, historic place in Colorado
- South Platte River Bridge (Park County, Colorado), bridge in Colorado
- South Platte River Trail Scenic and Historic Byway, in Colorado

== Art ==
- On the Platte River, Nebraska, painting by Albert Bierstadt

== Flora ==
- Platte River milkvetch (Astragalus plattensis), flowering plant in the United States

== See also ==
- River Plate (disambiguation)
- Platte (disambiguation)
