= Platts (disambiguation) =

S&P Global Commodity Insights, previously known as Platts (1923–2000, and the default that "Platts" still en.wikilinks to) and S&P Global Platts (2000–2022), is a provider of energy and commodities information. The word Platts still exists in a number of the renamed company's services.

Platts may also refer to:

- Bob Platts (1900–1975), English footballer
- John Thompson Platts (1830–1904), British scholar of Urdu and Persian
- Kenneth Platts (1946–1989), British composer
- Mark Platts (disambiguation)
- Robin Platts (born 1949), Canadian jockey
- Todd Russell Platts (born 1962), American politician
- Una Platts (1908–2005), New Zealand artist and art historian

== See also ==
- Platt (disambiguation)
- Platte (disambiguation)
