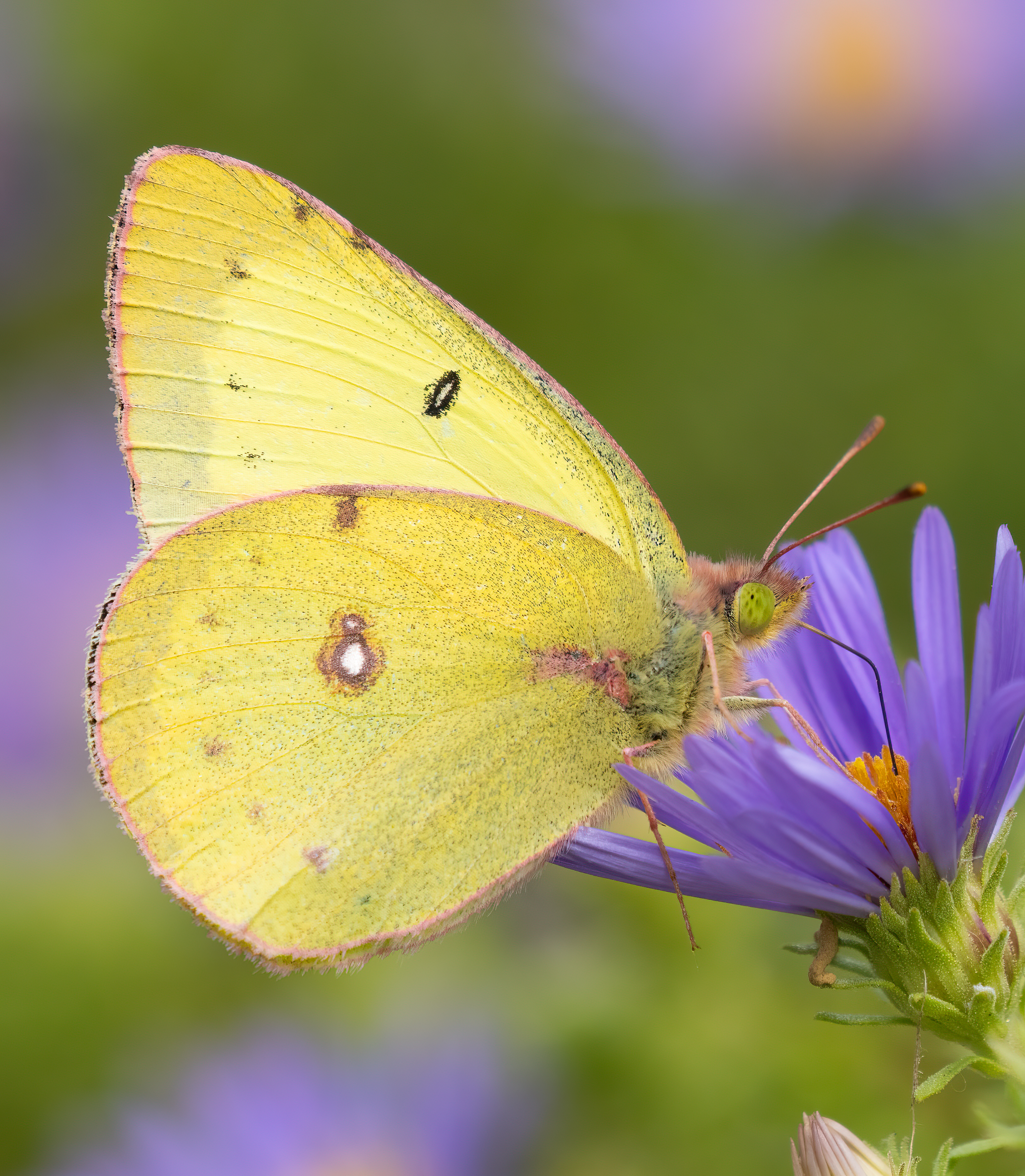
- Male

Conservation status
- Secure (NatureServe)

Scientific classification
- Kingdom: Animalia
- Phylum: Arthropoda
- Clade: Pancrustacea
- Class: Insecta
- Order: Lepidoptera
- Family: Pieridae
- Genus: Colias
- Species: C. philodice

Binomial name
- Colias philodice Godart, 1819
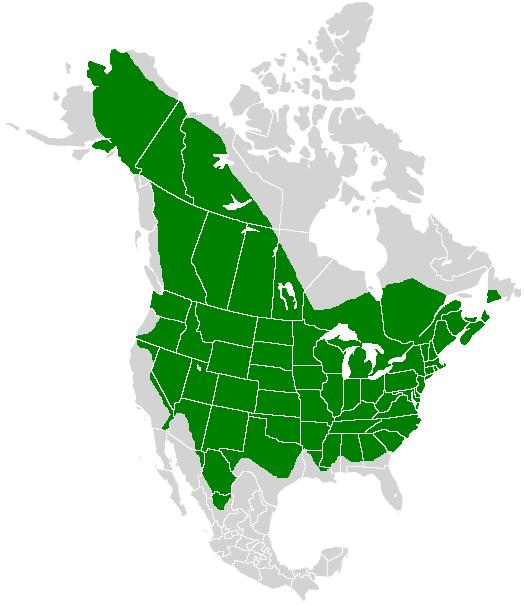

= Colias philodice =

Species of butterfly

Colias philodice, the common sulphur or clouded sulphur, is a North American butterfly in the family Pieridae, subfamily Coliadinae.

== Description ==
This species is a typical member of the genus. Both genders typically have pale yellow wings above with no traces of orange, unlike its close cousin the orange sulphur which may also be yellowish. Males have clean borders, while females have yellow dots within this region. Females sometimes exhibit a white form known as alba.

The underside of the male's wings is yellow while the female's is yellow or greenish white, and both have a doubled hindwing spot trimmed in brownish red. The hindwings show a series of four small red spots along the outer third portion, a trait that distinguishes the other North American species such as Colias interior, with exception of the orange sulphur which also shows them. Its wingspan is 32 to 54 mm.

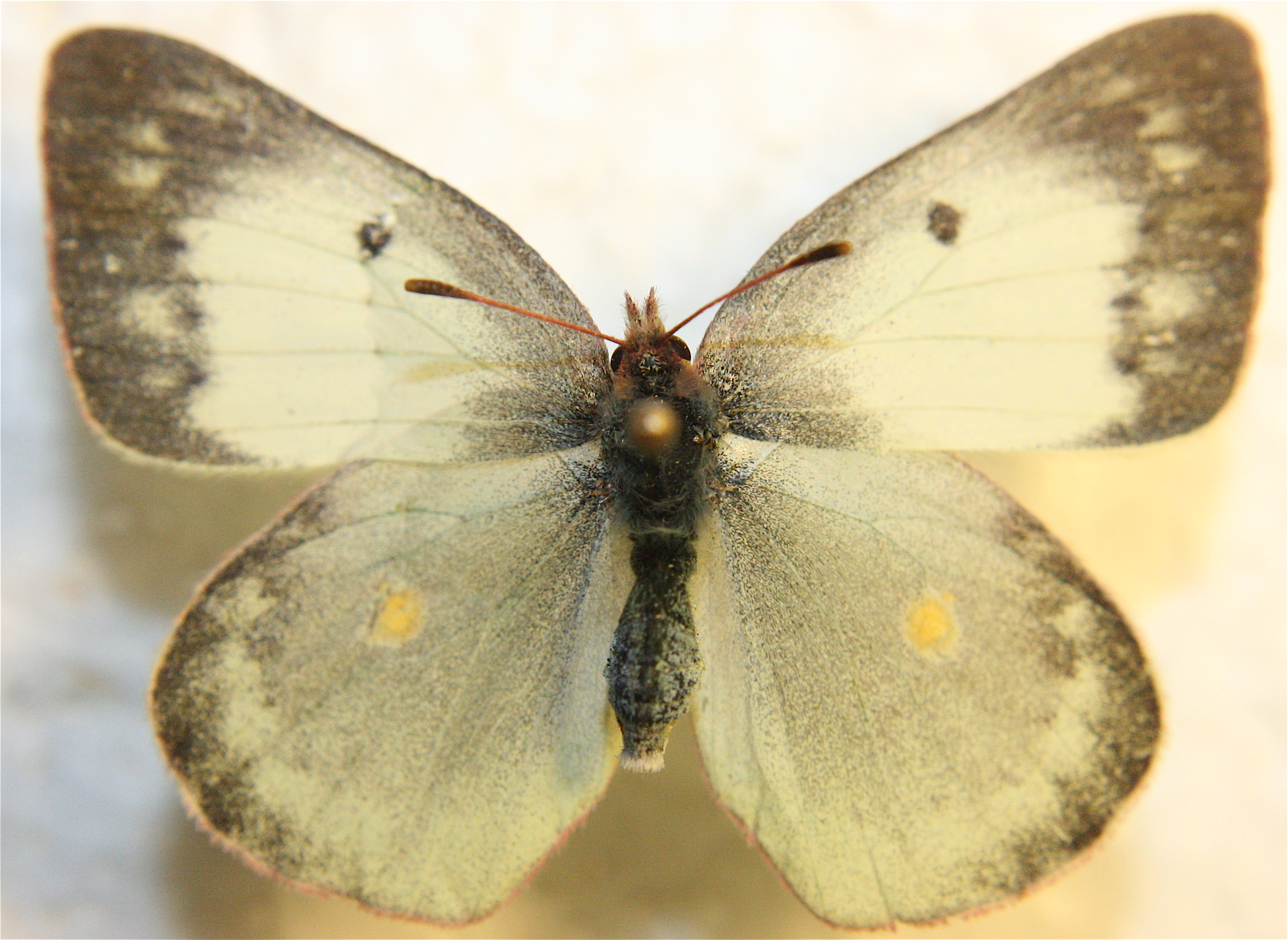
White form female

Form alba

This species has white form alba which can be very common in some populations, while rare in others. It can be confused with other white forms of Colias particularly that of Colias eurytheme. It can often be distinguished by the border pattern of both wings, though some individuals are impossible to separate without the presence of other "normal" specimens. Though they differ in flight style, the white forms of Colias may be confused with other pierids such as Pieris rapae and Pontia protodice.

White form males are also known, but they are exceedingly rare in this species.

== Habitat ==
This butterfly may be encountered in fields, lawns, alfalfa or clover fields, meadows, and roadsides. Swarms of these butterflies will congregate at mud puddles. They range over most of North America with the exception of Labrador, Nunavut, and northern Quebec. They migrate every year.

== Nectar plants ==
Clouded sulphurs nectar at flowers such as milkweed (Asclepias species), butterfly bush (Buddleja species), coneflower (Dracopis, Echinacea, and Rudbeckia), alfalfa (Medicago sativa), dandelion (Taraxacum species), clover (Trifolium species), and tall verbena (Verbena bonariensis) and many more.

== Host plants ==
Ground-plum (Astragalus crassicarpus), Platte River milk-vetch (Astragalus plattensis), soybean (Glycine max), deer vetch (Lotus species), alfalfa (Medicago sativa), white sweet clover (Melilotus albus), self-heal (Prunella vulgaris), black locust (Robinia pseudoacacia), white clover (Trifolium repens), red clover (Trifolium pratense), vetch (Vicia species).

== Life cycle ==
The pale yellow eggs are laid singly on the host plants. The eggs turn red after a few days, then turn gray just before they hatch. The young larvae will eat one another. The larva is green with a white stripe running along each side of the body. The white stripes may contain bars or lines of pink or orange. The green chrysalis hangs up right by a silken girdle. Just before eclosion, the chrysalis turns yellow with a pink "zipper".

== Reproduction ==
Virgin females of Colias philodice differentiate conspecific males (C. philodice) from C. eurytheme males on the basis of scent. Receptivity is characterized by taking up a fixed position and holding the abdomen ventrally between hindwings, and receptivity is identified by copulation.

== Gallery ==
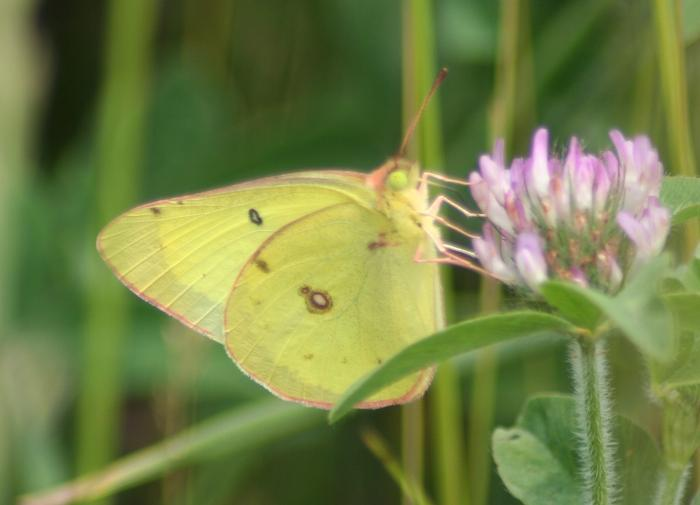
Male nectaring on red clover

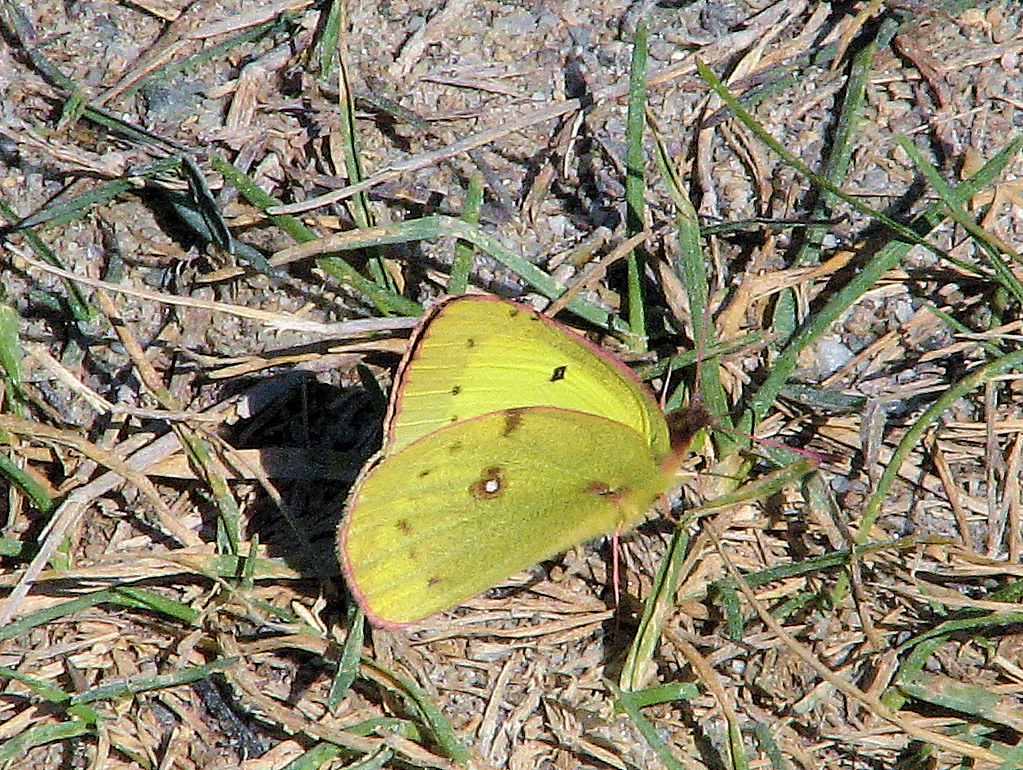
Male showing red fringe

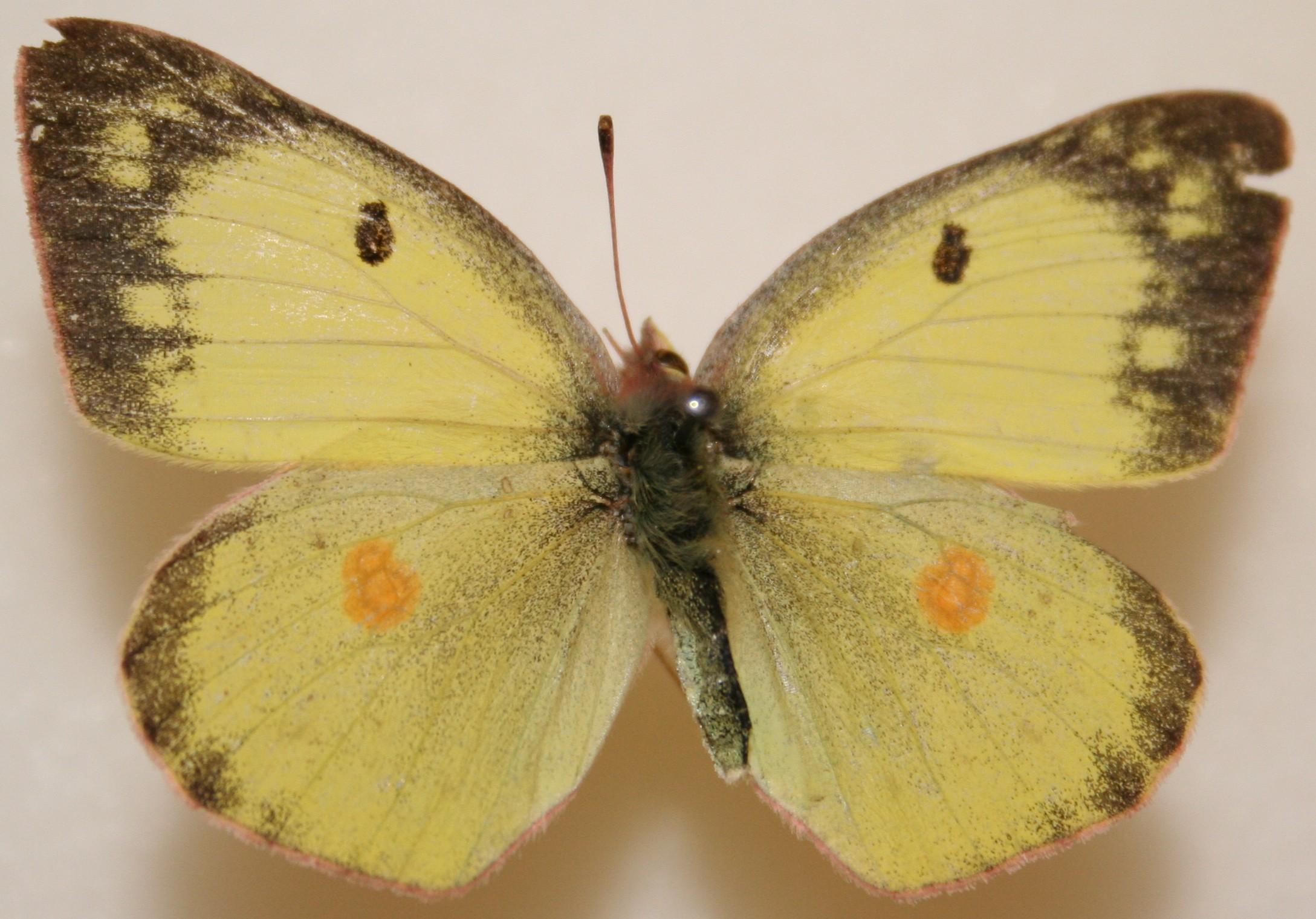
Female specimen

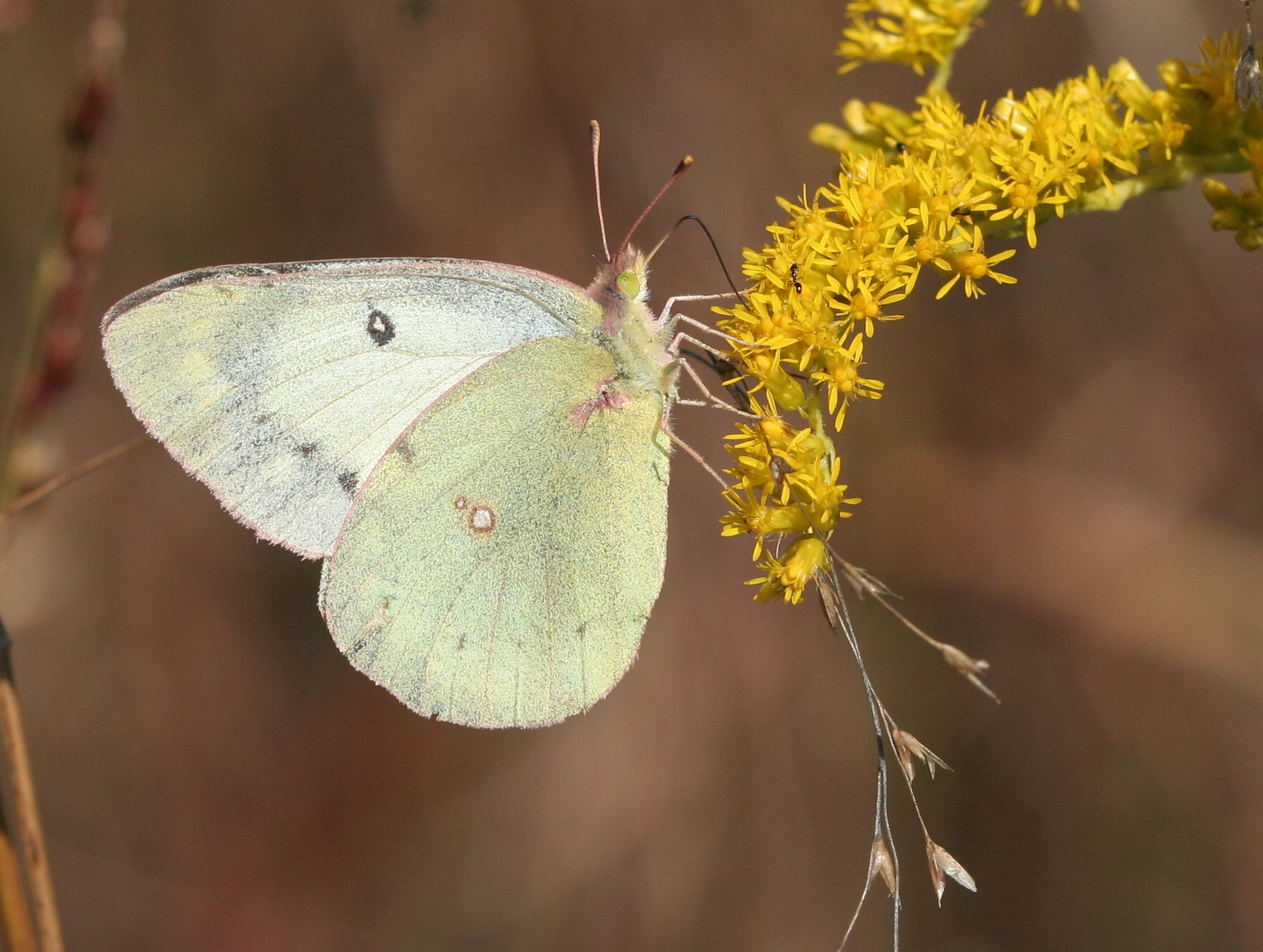
Underside of a white form female

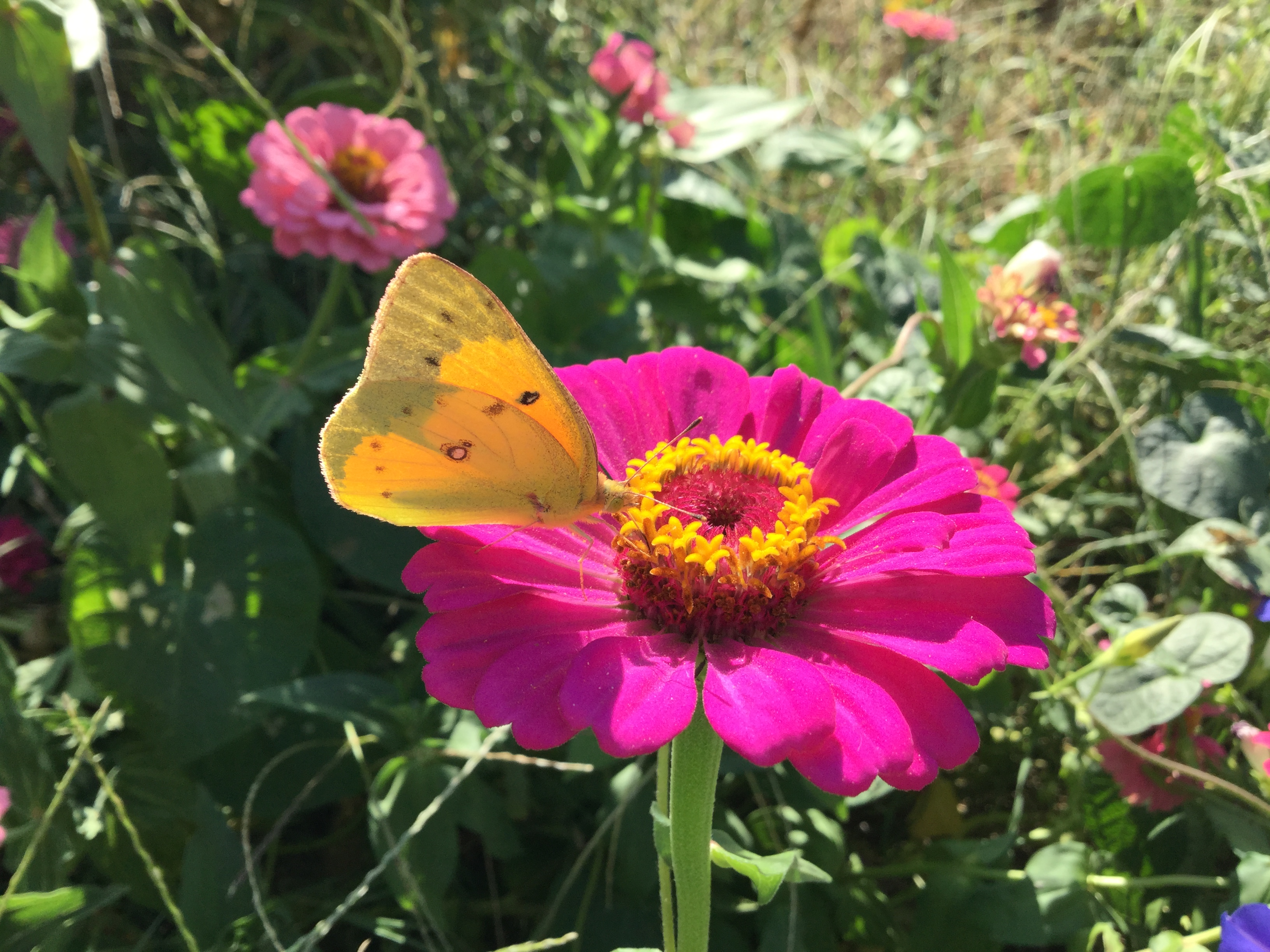
Specimen nectaring on a zinnia in the Southwest region of the U.S.

== Similar species ==
- Colias eurytheme – orange sulphur
- Colias interior – pink-edged sulphur
- Phoebis sennae – cloudless sulphur
