= Pellatt =

Pellatt is a surname. Notable people with the surname include:

- Apsley Pellatt (1791–1863), English glassware manufacturer and politician
- Apsley Pellatt (1763–1826), (1763–1826), English glass manufacturer
- Henry Pellatt, C.V.O. (1859–1939), Canadian financier and soldier
- Mary Pellatt (née Dodgson) (1857–1924), the first Chief Commissioner of the Girl Guides of Canada

== See also ==
- Bellatti
- Pellet (disambiguation)
- Platte (surname)
