= Pseudopontia gola =

Scientific classification
- Domain: Eukaryota
- Kingdom: Animalia
- Phylum: Arthropoda
- Class: Insecta
- Order: Lepidoptera
- Family: Pieridae
- Genus: Pseudopontia
- Species: P. gola

Binomial name
- Pseudopontia gola S. Safian and K. Mitter, 2011

Species of butterfly

Pseudopontia gola is a butterfly in the family Pieridae. It is found in Sierra Leone and Liberia.
