= Platt =

Platt may refer to:

== Places ==
- Platt, Austria
- Platt, Florida, an unincorporated community in DeSoto County, Florida, United States
- Platt, Texas, a ghost town in Angelina County, in the U.S. state of Texas
- Platt, Kent, England

== People ==
- Platt (surname)
- Platt (given name)
- Platt baronets, two baronetcies of the United Kingdom

== Other uses ==
- Leggett & Platt, manufacturing company
- Low German, in German known as "Plattdeutsch", "Plattdüütsch", "Platt"
- Platt Amendment, a 1901 U.S. law pertaining to Cuba-U.S. relations
- Platt Brothers, manufacturers of textile machinery in Oldham, England
- Platt Fields Park, a park in Fallowfield, Manchester, England
- Platt Island, an archaeological site near Miles City, Florida
- Platt-LePage Aircraft Company, an American aircraft company
- Platt Music, an American music retailer
- Platt National Park, which became part of Chickasaw National Recreation Area
- Platt Technical High School
- Platt Building, a historic building in downtown Los Angeles
- Platt (genus), a genus of digenetic trematodes in the family Spirorchiidae

== See also ==
- Plat (disambiguation)
  - Plat, in the United States, is a map, drawn to scale, showing the divisions of a piece of land
- Platte (disambiguation)
- Platts (disambiguation)
- Plait (disambiguation)
