= Pseudopontia mabira =

Scientific classification
- Domain: Eukaryota
- Kingdom: Animalia
- Phylum: Arthropoda
- Class: Insecta
- Order: Lepidoptera
- Family: Pieridae
- Genus: Pseudopontia
- Species: P. mabira

Binomial name
- Pseudopontia mabira K. Mitter and S. Collins, 2011

Species of butterfly

Pseudopontia mabira is a butterfly belonging to the family Pieridae. It is found in Uganda and the Democratic Republic of Congo occurring within approximately 5 degrees latitude north and south of the Equator.
