= Pseudopontia australis =

Scientific classification
- Domain: Eukaryota
- Kingdom: Animalia
- Phylum: Arthropoda
- Class: Insecta
- Order: Lepidoptera
- Family: Pieridae
- Genus: Pseudopontia
- Species: P. australis

Binomial name
- Pseudopontia australis Dixey, 1923

Synonyms
- Pseudopontia paradoxa australis Dixey, 1923; Pseudopontia paradoxa australis f. siccana Pinhey, 1962

Species of butterfly

Pseudopontia australis is a butterfly in the family Pieridae. It is found in the Democratic Republic of the Congo, the Republic of the Congo and eastern Gabon.
