= Diocesan School for Girls, Auckland =

School in Epsom, Auckland, New Zealand

Diocesan School for Girls

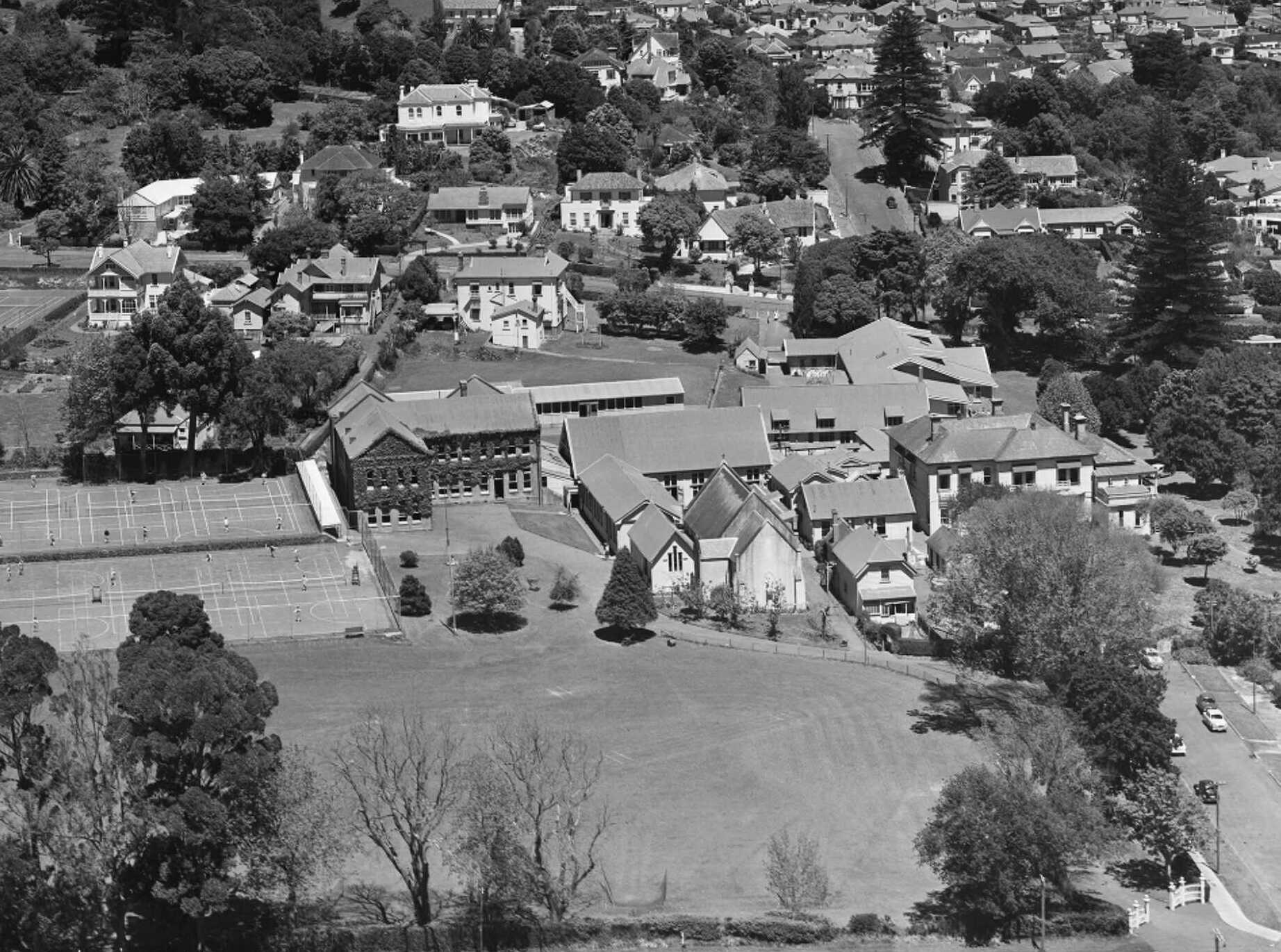
- Aerial view of Diocesan School for Girls in 1957

Location
- Clyde Street; Epsom; Auckland; New Zealand. 36.8801°S 174.7797°E

Information
- Type: Private, girls, composite (Year 1–13) with boarding facilities
- Motto: Latin: Ut Serviamus (That we may serve)
- Denomination: Anglican
- Established: 1903; 123 years ago
- Ministry of Education Institution no.: 67
- Principal: Heather McRae
- Enrolment: 1,725 (July 2026)
- Socio-economic decile: 10
- Website: diocesan.school.nz

Diocesan School for Girls (Dio) is a private girls' school in Epsom, Auckland, New Zealand. It is consistently a top-achieving school nationally. The school is Anglican-based and was established in 1903. It caters to international students and has accommodation for 50 boarders at Innes House. The school elected to offer students the option of International Baccalaureate diplomas, as an alternative to the national NCEA qualification, from 2008.

== History ==
Bishop Moore Richard Neligan first proposed the Diocesan School for Girls in October 1903. A subcommittee of the synod purchased land in November 1903, and the first class began on 27 May 1904 with twenty-five students and Mary Etheldred Pulling as headmistress. Neligan formally dedicated the school on 14 June 1904, and the school celebrates its birthday on this date. The founders were Auckland businessperson Stephen Cochrane, Dr Ernest Roberton, Lord Ranfurly, Edwin Mitchelson, Bishop Williams of Waiapu and Bishop Neligan
The former Goodall Construction company constructed many of the buildings.

== Enrolment ==
As a private school, Diocesan School charges tuition fees to cover costs. For the 2025 school year, tuition fees for New Zealand residents are $25,880 per year for students in years 1 to 6 and $29,870 per year for students in years 7 and above. Boarding fees are an additional $21,210 per year.

At the school's May 2021 Education Review Office (ERO) review, Diocesan School had 1,659 students, including 35 international students. Around 59 percent of students at the school identified as New Zealand European (Pākehā), 31 percent as Asian, 0.5 percent as Māori, and 0.2 percent as Pacific Islanders.

As of July 2026, Diocesan School has roll of 1,725 students, of which 98 (5.7%) identify as Māori. As a private school, the school is not assigned an Equity Index.

== Technology ==
The school opened a $4 million science block in 1999. During that year a pilot system to supply all students with notebooks was run with two year-8 classes. By November 1999 the school had three IT staff, supporting 469 PCs (150 of which were notebooks), 110 printers, and 6 file servers. The school introduced electronic whiteboards in 2005 that allow students to download class notes directly to their notebooks. In 2006, it ranked as the 96th largest IT organisation in New Zealand, with a staff of eight supporting 300 PCs and 1,170 notebooks. in 2012 the school officially opened a new water-based sports turf and underground car park. The sports turf is identical in likeness to the one in London built for the 2012 London Olympics.

== Headmistresses and principals ==
Since the school was established, there have been 11 headmistresses or principals.

	Name	Portrait	Term
1	Mary Pulling		1904–1926
2	Ethel Sandford		1927–1932
3	Eliza Edwards		1933–1950
4	Dorothy Shrewsbury		1951–1965
5	Elizabeth Roberton		1966–1972
6	Jean Crosher		1973
7	Beverley Williamson		1974
8	Dawn Jones		1974–1993
9	Gail Thomson		1993–2003
10	Ann Mildenhall		2003–2008
11	Heather McRae		2009–present
12	Sandra Hasties		2026-present

== Notable alumnae ==
- Stephanie Bond – netball player
- Margaret Brimble – chemist
- Alice Bush – doctor and paediatrician
- Niki Caro – writer and director of Whale Rider and Mulan
- Kimberley Crossman – Shortland Street and Power Rangers Samurai television actor
- Tessa Duder – children's author and swimming champion
- Sian Elias – New Zealand's first female Chief Justice
- Holly Rose Emery – model
- Georgia Fowler – supermodel
- Charlotte Glennie – television journalist
- Katie Glynn – field hockey player, member of Black Sticks Women (2009–)
- Christobelle Grierson-Ryrie – winner of the first cycle of New Zealand's Next Top Model, attended in 2009
- Ella Gunson – field hockey player, member of Black Sticks Women (2009–)
- Samantha Harrison – field hockey player, member of Black Sticks Women (2009–) (also attended Whangarei Girls' High School)
- Anna Lawrence – Olympic field hockey midfielder
- Jamie McDell – New Zealand singer, before moving on to King's College
- Meredith Orr – Olympic field hockey midfielder
- Una Platts – art historian
- Allison Roe MBE – winner of the 1981 New York and Boston Marathons
- Jaime Ridge – Socialite, before moving to King's College for Year 12
- May Smith – painter, engraver, textile designer and textile printer
- Peggy Spicer – artist
- Sarah Ulmer – first New Zealander to win an Olympic cycling gold medal
- Arena Williams – member of New Zealand Parliament
- Quilae Wong – leader of the Opportunity Party
- Chantel Yiu – Hong Kong singer & artist
