= Pseudopontia zambezi =

Scientific classification
- Domain: Eukaryota
- Kingdom: Animalia
- Phylum: Arthropoda
- Class: Insecta
- Order: Lepidoptera
- Family: Pieridae
- Genus: Pseudopontia
- Species: P. zambezi

Binomial name
- Pseudopontia zambezi K. Mitter and W. De Prins, 2011

Species of butterfly

Pseudopontia zambezi is a butterfly in the family Pieridae. It is found in riverine forests in the southern African highlands in the Democratic Republic of Congo, Zambia and Angola, at elevations over 800 meters above sea level.
