= Platt (given name) =

Platt is a given name. People with the name include:

- Platt Adams (1885–1961), American athlete
- Platt Adams (politician) (1792–1887), American merchant and politician
- Platt D. Babbitt (1822–1879), American photographer
- Platt Gollings (1878–1935), English footballer
- Platt A. Preston (1837–1900), American politician
- Platt Rogers (1850–1928), American politician
- Platt Rogers Spencer (1800–1864), originator of Spencerian penmanship, a popular system of cursive handwriting
- Platt D. Walker (1849–1923), justice of the North Carolina Supreme Court
- Platt Whitman (1871–1935), American lawyer, banker, and politician

== See also ==
- Platt (disambiguation)
- Platt (surname)
