= Holly Rose Emery =

New Zealand fashion model

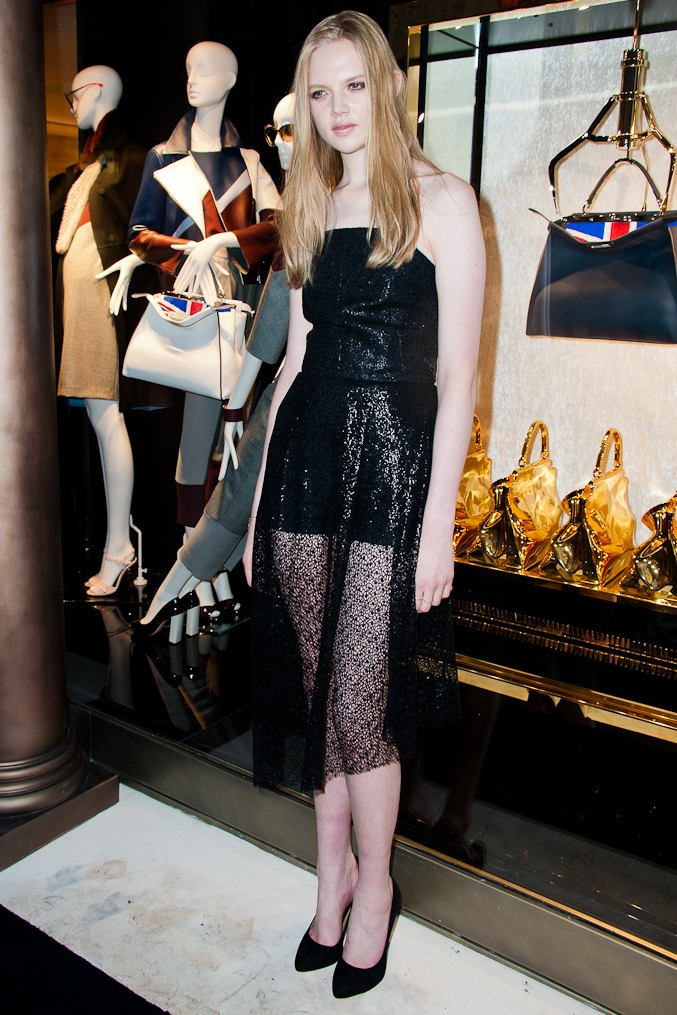
- Holly Rose Emery in London (2014)
- Born: 29 May 1996 (age 30); Auckland, New Zealand
- Occupation: Model
- Modeling information
- Height: 5 ft 11 in (1.80 m)
- Hair color: Blonde
- Agency: Michael Hooker International, Inc. (New York); Next Model Management (Paris, Milan, London); Red Eleven Model Management (Auckland); Chic Management (Sydney)

Holly Rose Emery (born 29 May 1996) is a model from New Zealand. In 2013, she appeared on the cover of Australia's edition of Vogue, which said she was "one of the most in-demand models in the southern hemisphere".

== Early life ==
Emery lived in Auckland and attended the Diocesan School for Girls, where she played netball. She weighed 95 kg, which interfered with her ability to play netball. To improve her physical ability for the sport, she opted to lose weight under a medically supervised plan, losing 36 kg over 2 years. She went from a Body Mass Index (BMI) of 29.32, which was close to being classified as "obese", down to a BMI of 18, which puts her slightly below what is considered the healthy range. For comparison, the average BMI in New Zealand was 27 in 2008. The weight lost greatly helped her to become in demand in modelling, but caused her to be criticised by some at her school, for being unhealthy, which she disputes.

== Modelling ==
Emery was signed up to be a model with Red Eleven modelling agency at age 16. Emery has modeled in London, Milan, New York, and Paris. Her first international runway debut was for Prada. She modeled in shows for Chanel, Dries van Noten, Marc Jacobs, Marni, Miu Miu, Nina Ricci, and Valentino Garavani. In 2013, Daniel Robson of Harper's Bazaar said Emery was one of the three "biggest breakthroughs of New York Fashion Week."
