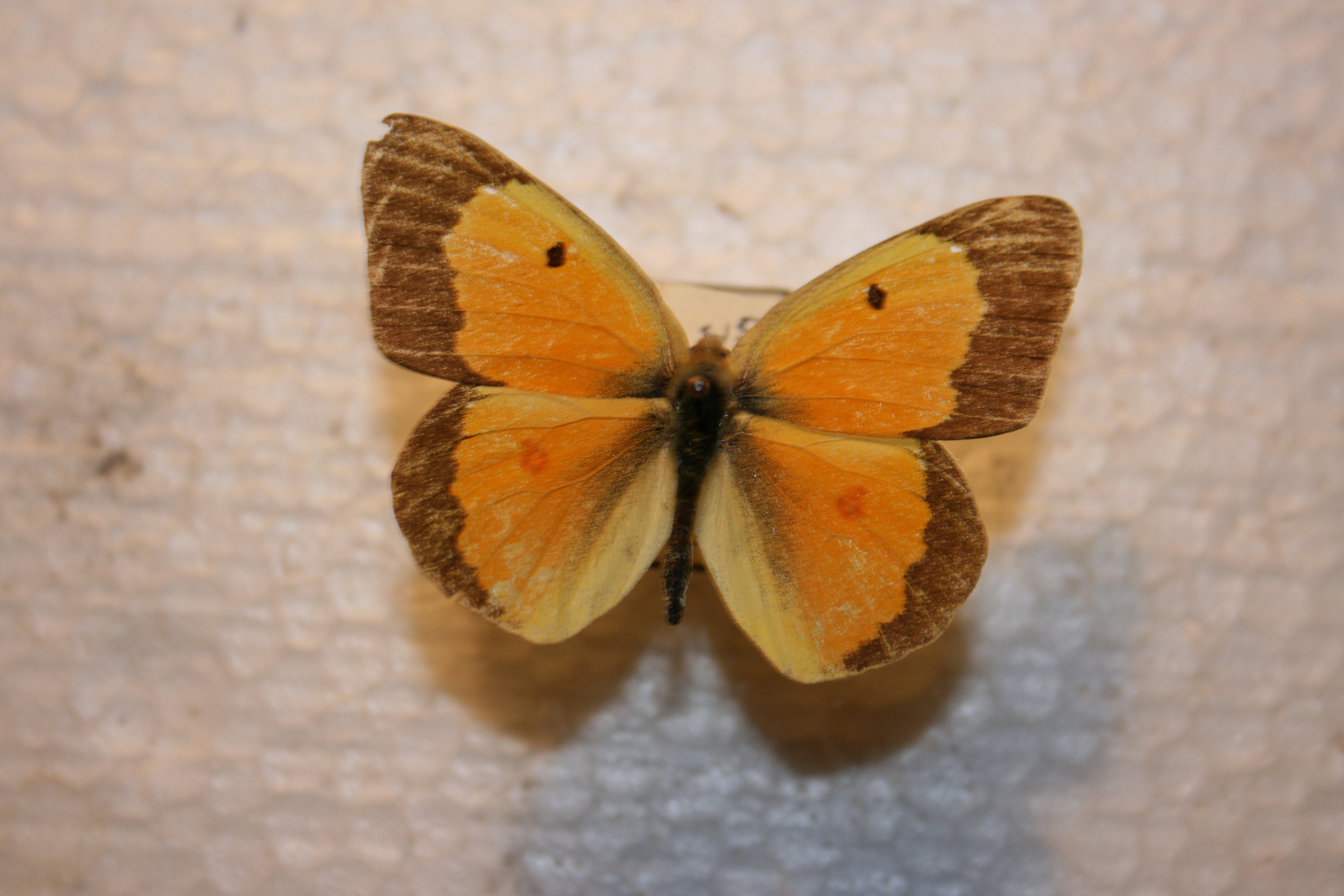
- Dorsal view
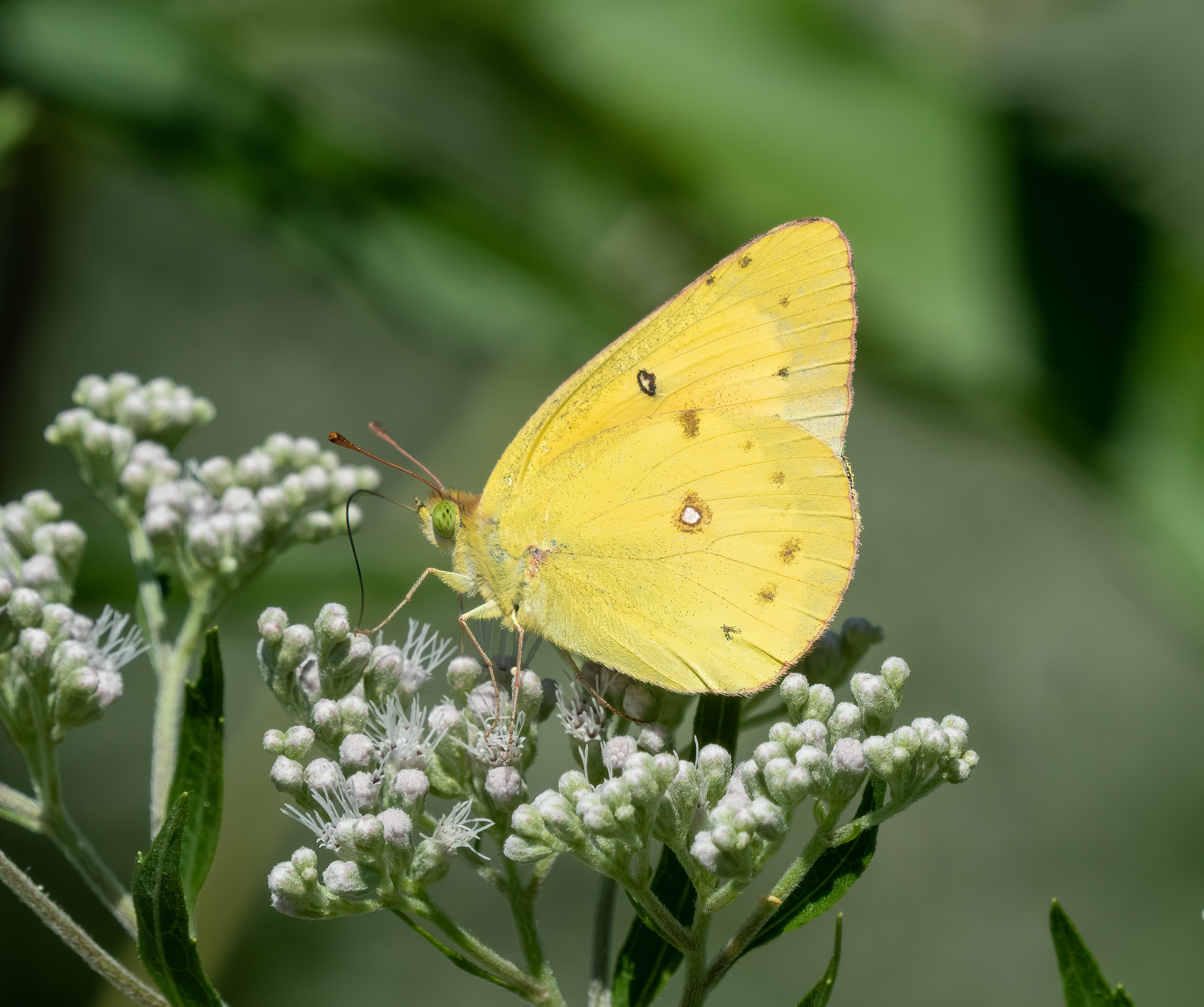
- Ventral view

Conservation status
- Least Concern (IUCN 3.1)

- Secure (NatureServe)

Scientific classification
- Kingdom: Animalia
- Phylum: Arthropoda
- Clade: Pancrustacea
- Class: Insecta
- Order: Lepidoptera
- Family: Pieridae
- Genus: Colias
- Species: C. eurytheme

Binomial name
- Colias eurytheme Boisduval, 1852

= Colias eurytheme =

Species of butterfly

Colias eurytheme, the orange sulphur, also known as the alfalfa butterfly and in its larval stage as the alfalfa caterpillar, is a butterfly of the family Pieridae, where it belongs to the lowland group of "clouded yellows and sulphurs" subfamily Coliadinae. It is found throughout North America from southern Canada to Mexico.

Other members of this lineage including the common or clouded sulphur (C. philodice) and C. eriphyle and C. vitabunda, which are often included in C. philodice as subspecies. Hybridization runs rampant between these, making phylogenetic analyses exclusively utilizing one type of data (especially mtDNA sequences) unreliable. Therefore, little more can be said about its relationships, except that it is perhaps closer to C. (p.) eriphyle than generally assumed, strengthening the view that the latter should be considered a valid species.

The orange sulphur's caterpillars feed off various species in the pea family (Fabaceae) and are usually only found feeding at night. Occasionally this species multiplies to high numbers, and can become a serious pest to alfalfa (Medicago sativa) crops. The parasitoid wasp, Cotesia medicaginis can be used as a biocontrol agent against the caterpillars.

== Distribution ==
C. eurytheme butterflies can be found from southern Mexico to almost all throughout North America. Historically, they were distributed primarily in the western Nearctic, but were displaced to the east by logging and alfalfa field planting.

== Appearance ==
=== Wing pattern ===
Male C. eurytheme hindwings demonstrate an ultraviolet reflectance pattern while female C. eurytheme hindwings demonstrate ultraviolet absorbing patterns. According to studies, these ultraviolet reflecting wing scales found in males also contain pterin pigments that absorb wavelengths below 550 nm. Although this may seem paradoxical, the pterin pigments have been found to decrease the amount of diffuse ultraviolet reflectance that comes from the wing scales. By suppressing the diffuse ultraviolet reflectance, the directionality and spectral purity of the iridescence is heightened. In addition, the presence of the pterin pigments increases the signal's chromaticity and potential signal content, suggesting that these pigments are responsible for amplifying the contrast between ultraviolet reflectance and background colors as a male's wings move during flight. Further studies have found that the ultraviolet reflectance signal is brightest within a wing beat cycle when viewed from directly above the male. This supports the idea that male wing color should be able to be readily distinguished from that of females and the visual background that consists mostly of UV-absorbing vegetation.

==== Form alba ====
Females of this species have a white morph known as alba. This morph is also present in other Colias species, including Colias philodice, with which it may be confused.

== Genetic inheritance ==
Studies have suggested that most of the genes controlling male courtship signals are inherited as a co-adapted gene complex on the X-chromosome. The X-chromosome carries most of the genes controlling production of 13-methyl heptacosane, the main component of pheromones involved in sexual selection, and the ultraviolet wing reflectance pattern. Expression of the ultraviolet wing reflectance pattern found in male C. eurytheme is controlled by a recessive allele on the X-chromosome. This trait is sex limited and not expressed in females of the same species.

== Reproduction ==
=== Reproductive behavior ===
Unlike that of many other butterfly species, the courtship of C. eurytheme is very brief and does not involve many elaborate displays. Mature female butterflies participate in mate selection by utilizing a specific refusal posture that prevents any undesired mating with both conspecific and non-conspecific males.

These butterflies exhibit a polyandrous mating system. Upon mating, male C. eurytheme donate a nutritious spermatophore to the female, which will erode over time as nutrients are extracted for egg production and somatic maintenance. Females have a refractory period during which time they do not mate, but after they have depleted their spermatophore, they will search for another one and thus look for a new mate. In this mating system, females re-mate once every 4 to 6 days in summer, and mate a lifetime total of up to four times.

=== Sexual selection ===
Male C. eurytheme have a visual cue (ultraviolet reflectance) and an olfactory cue (pheromones), both of which are suggested to be important in mate choice. Studies have suggested that pheromones may be more important in mediating female choice within a species, while ultraviolet reflectance may be more important in mediating female choice between species, such as between the very similar butterflies C. eurytheme and C. philodice. The pheromone, located on the dorsal surface of the hindwing, consists of cuticular hydrocarbons n-heptacosane (C27), 13-methylheptacosane (13-MeC27), and possibly n-nonacosane (C29). In addition, wing scales located on the dorsal wing surfaces in male C. eurytheme contain ridges with lamellae that produce iridescent ultraviolet reflectance via thin-film interference.

C. eurytheme males rely on visual cues to locate and identify females. Instead of using chemical stimuli to find mates, males are attracted to the ultraviolet absorbing color of female hindwings. Studies have shown that males respond to paper dummies of the appropriate color and even attempt to mate with them. On the contrary, the ultraviolet reflection found on males strongly inhibits approaches from other males. This suggests that ultraviolet reflectance is also used by males as an inhibitory signal directed towards other males.

Unlike sexual selection in males, visible color differences among males do not play an important role in mate selection by females. Females preferentially mate with males whose wings reflect ultraviolet light. Studies have suggested that this trait was the strongest and most informative predictor of male courtship success. This may be because it has the potential to be an honest indicator of male condition, viability, and/or age.

Due to the widespread cultivation of the alfalfa, the host plant for C. eurytheme and C. philodice, the species was able to expand their ranges across most of North America. These two species of sulphur butterflies have retained a large degree of genetic compatibility that allows them the produce viable and fertile offspring. As a result of the recent sympatry and possible hybridization between these two species of sulphur butterflies, numerous studies have been conducted on intraspecific and interspecific mating. In terms of mating under natural conditions, the males do not discriminate between the species, but females maintain nearly complete reproductive isolation. Studies suggest that the females do so by looking for the ultraviolet reflectance pattern on the dorsal wing surface of C. eurytheme males. Therefore, it was suggested that C. eurytheme and C. philodice do not randomly mate with each other. Instead, mating was found to be positively assortive and mostly conspecific.

=== Sexual selection theory ===
Previous studies have suggested that males make a nutrient investment during copulation. This idea agrees with the sexual selection theory, which predicts that females would act in ways to maximize the nutrient material they receive and predicts that males would act in ways to maximize the return on their investments. Studies support this theory by showing that younger males (males with less wing wear) are more successful in courtship than older males, males accepted by females are significantly less variable in size than males rejected by females, persistence increases a male's chance of copulating up to a point, and the size of females accepted by males is less variable than that of rejected females. The amount of protein in a male's spermatophore is negatively correlated with age because it is more likely for older males to have mated previously. Females therefore prefer younger mates perhaps to secure large ejaculates, as smaller males and males that have mated previously produce smaller ejaculates. The brightness of ultraviolet reflectance and pheromone descriptors, both important factors in mate selection, are also negatively correlated with age. However, variation between these two traits (visual and olfactory) is mostly uncorrelated. Since ultraviolet brightness emerges as the best predictor of male mating success, female preferences for brighter males may also indicate its relation to a material benefit. In addition, studies have shown a longevity difference between virgin and mated females, suggesting a cost to mating. It is hypothesized that there is a toxic side effect of the male ejaculate. However, it is still unclear how this longevity cost influences the evolution of lifetime mating schedules. The supposed cost also does not affect the number of eggs a female lays in its lifetime.

== Gallery ==
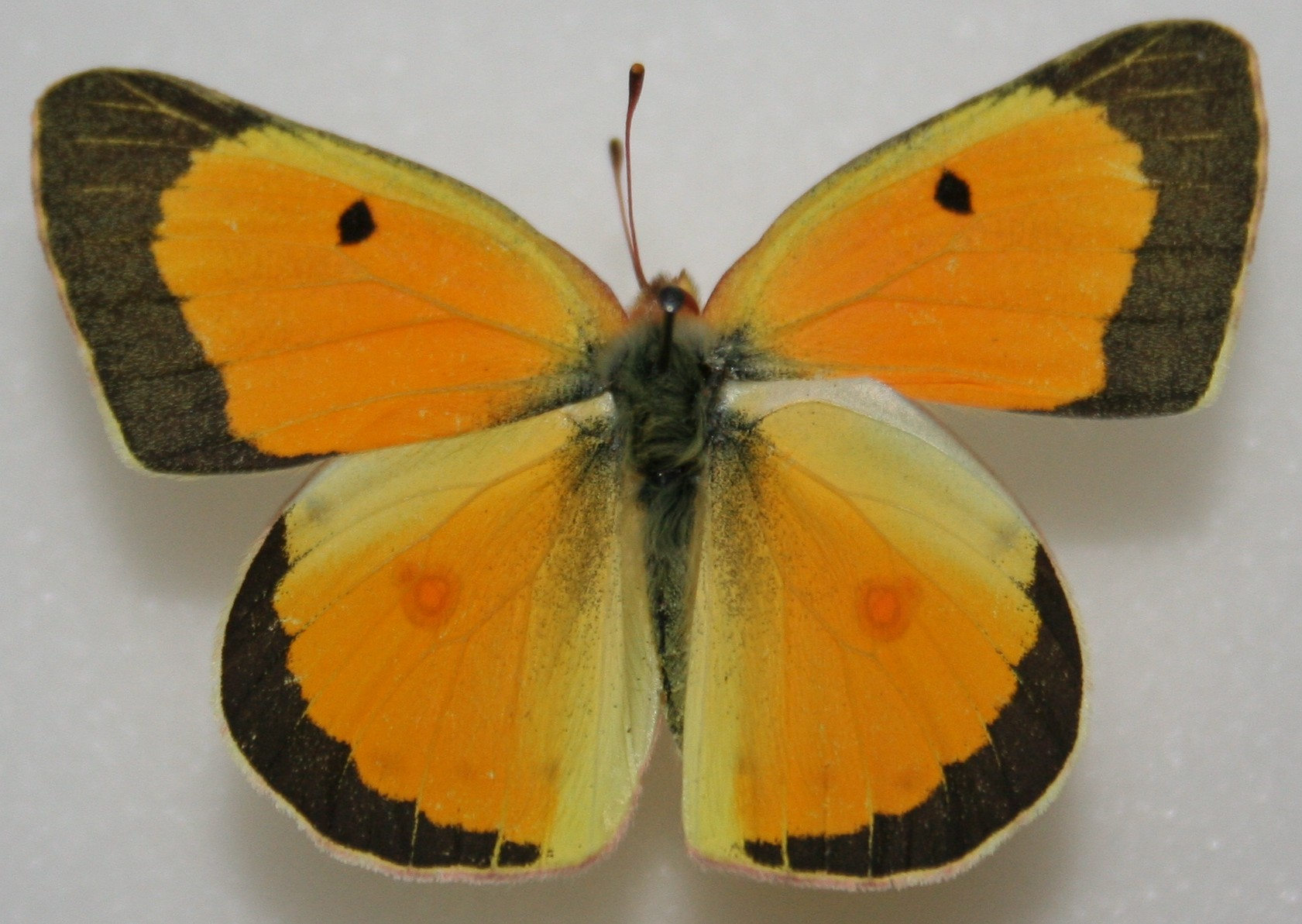
Upperside of male

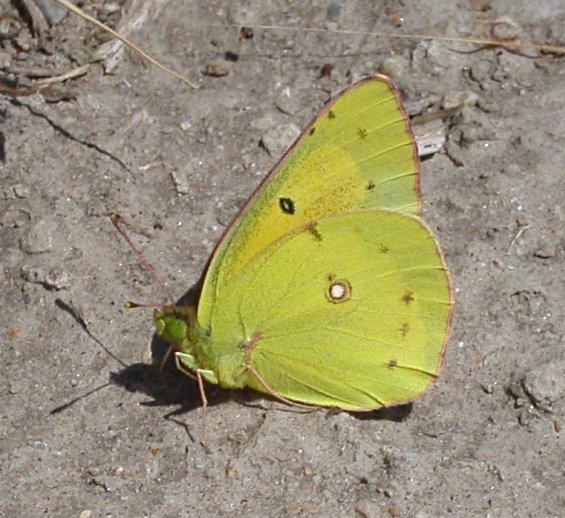
Underside pattern

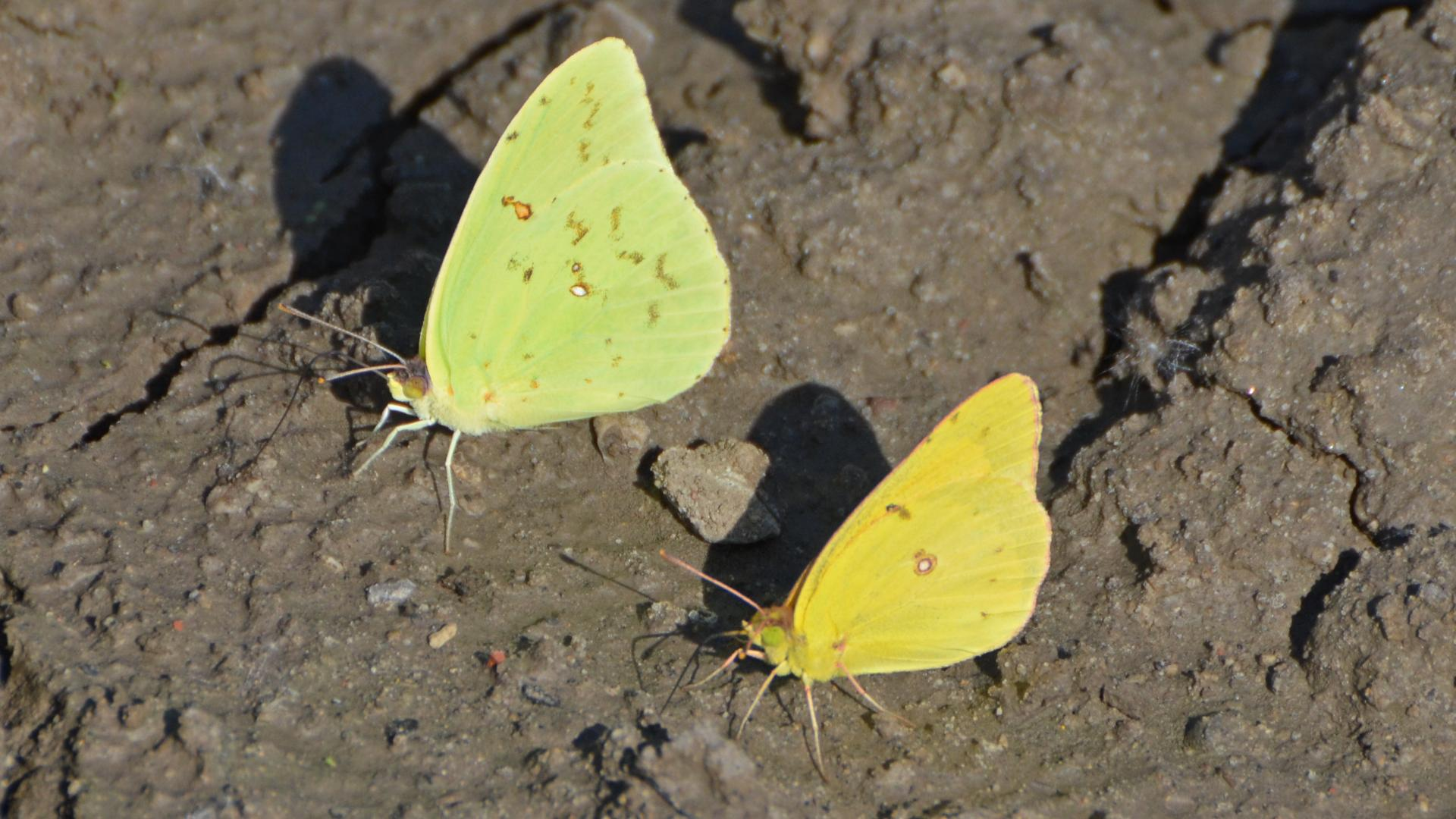
Cloudless sulphur male (left) and orange sulphur male (right)

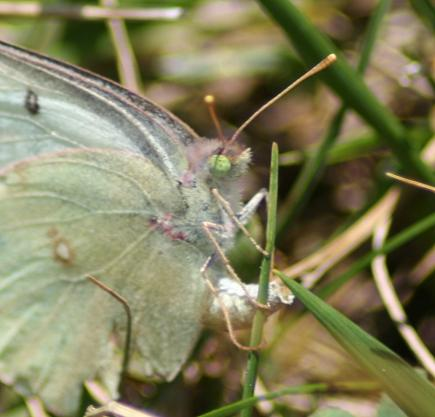
Albino female laying an egg
