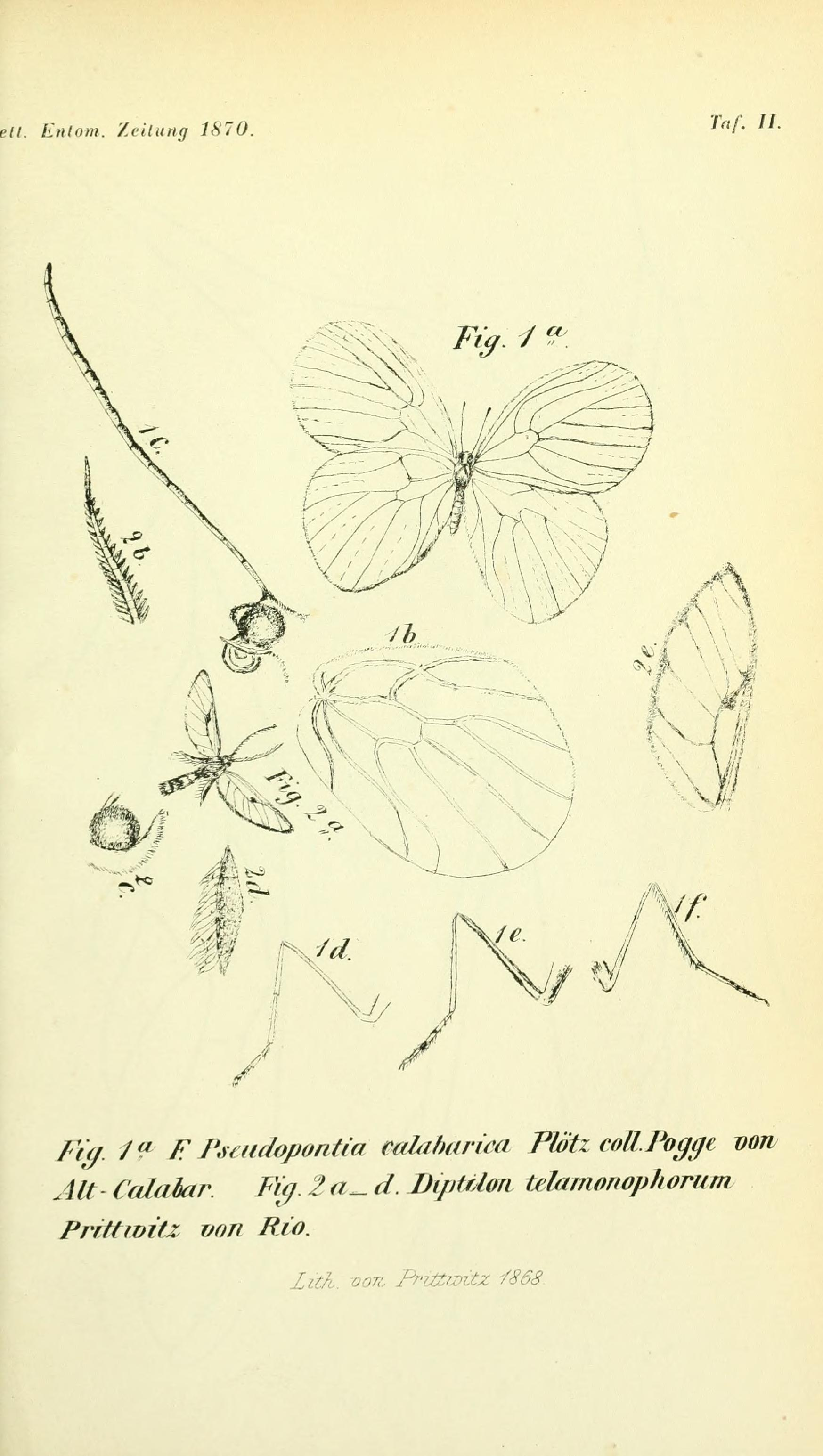

Scientific classification
- Kingdom: Animalia
- Phylum: Arthropoda
- Clade: Pancrustacea
- Class: Insecta
- Order: Lepidoptera
- Family: Pieridae
- Genus: Pseudopontia
- Species: P. paradoxa

Binomial name
- Pseudopontia paradoxa (Felder, 1869)

Synonyms
- Globiceps paradoxa Felder & Felder, 1869; Pseudopontia calabarica Plötz, 1870; Pseudopontia cepheus Ehrmann, 1894

= Pseudopontia paradoxa =

Species of butterfly

Pseudopontia paradoxa is a species of butterfly found only in wet forests of tropical Africa. It was traditionally thought to be the only species (monotypic) in the genus Pseudopontia and the subfamily Pseudopontiinae.

The larvae feed on Pseuderanthemum tunicatum, Rhopalopilia marquesii and Rhopalopilia pallens.

Torben Larsen developed a species numbering system for his 2005 publication Butterflies of West Africa. This species is #35. The 'Larsen' numbers have since been used with permission in A Sharp Eye on Butterflies of Ghana.

== Sources ==
- Plötz, C. (1870) Pseudopontia Calabarica n. gen. et n. sp. Stettiner Entomologischer Zeitung, 31, 348–349, 1 pl.
- Felder, R. (1869) [no title]. Petites Nouvelles Entomologiques, 1, 30–31.
- Felder, R. (1870) Gonophlebia (Globiceps), Paradoxa (Felder). Petites Nouvelles Entomologiques, 1, 95.
- Dixey, F.A. (1923) Pseudopontia paradoxa: its affinities, mimetic relations, and geographical races. Proceedings of the Entomological Society (London), lxi–lxvii +plate B.
- Mitter, K.T., Larsen, T.B., et al. (2011). The butterfly subfamily Pseudopontiinae is not monobasic: marked genetic diversity and morphology reveal three new species of Pseudopontia (Lepidoptera: Pieridae). Systematic Entomology 36: 139–163. DOI: 10.1111/j.1365-3113.2010.00549.x
