= Platen (disambiguation) =

A platen is a printing plate.

Platen may also refer to:

- Platen (Pomeranian family)
- Platen (surname)
- Platen, Luxembourg

== See also ==
- Platten (disambiguation)
