= Platten =

Platten may refer to:

== People ==
- Fritz Platten (1883–1942), Swiss communist
- John Platten (born 1963), Australian rules footballer
- Rachel Platten (born 1981), American singer and songwriter
- Sören Platten, (born 1988), German politician
- Stephen George Platten (born 1947), Bishop of Wakefield (Church of England)

== Places ==
- Platten, Germany, a municipality in Rhineland-Palatinate, Germany
- Platten, the German name for Blatno (Chomutov District), a village in the Czech Republic
- Bergstadt Platten, the German name for Horní Blatná, a town in the Czech Republic

== Other uses ==
- An alternate spelling of platen, a platform with a variety of roles in printing or manufacturing

== See also ==
- Lake Platten-See or Lake Balaton, a freshwater lake in the Transdanubian region of Hungary
- Platen (disambiguation)
