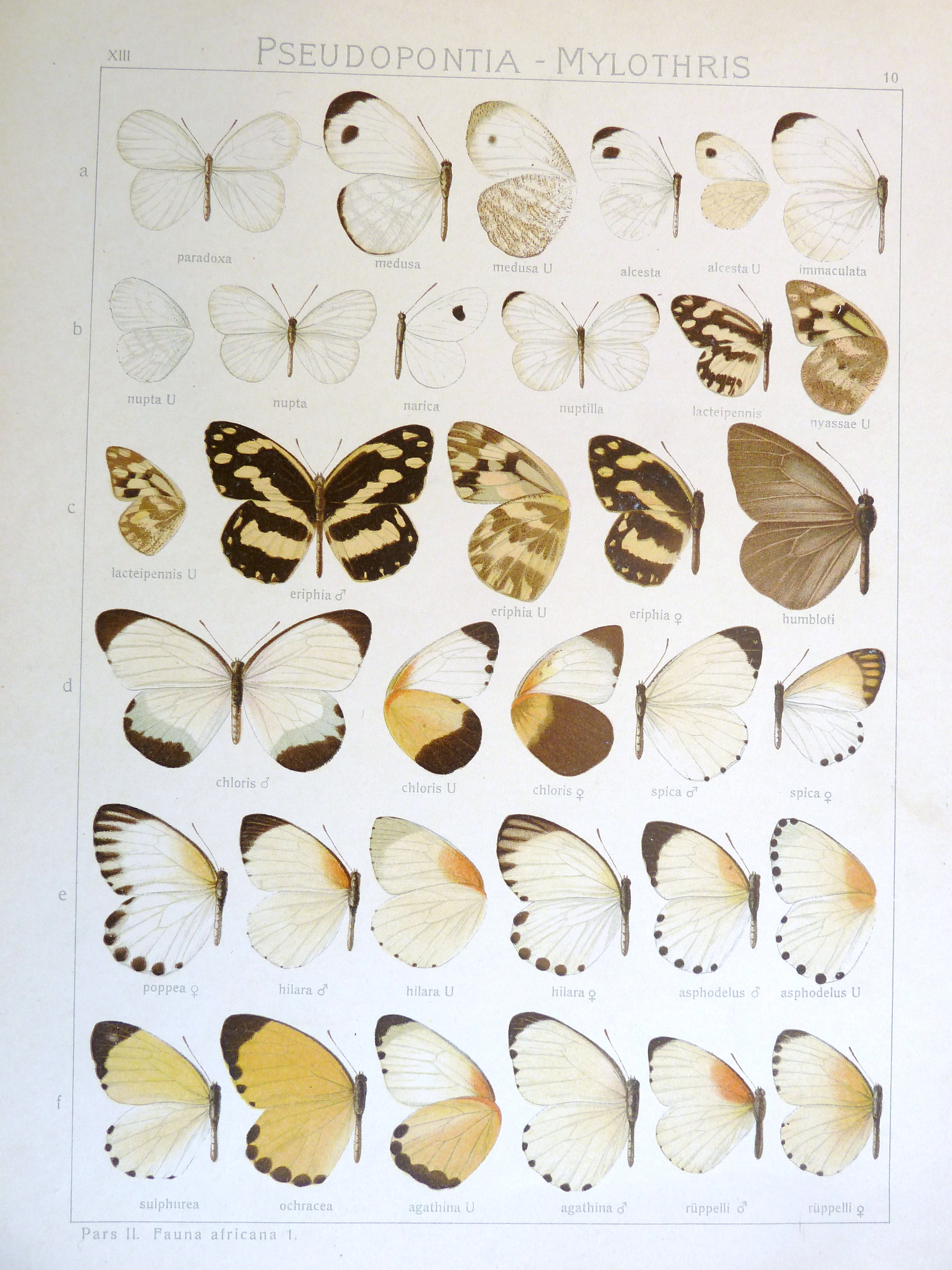
- Pseudopontia in Adalbert Seitz's Fauna Africana

Scientific classification
- Domain: Eukaryota
- Kingdom: Animalia
- Phylum: Arthropoda
- Class: Insecta
- Order: Lepidoptera
- Family: Pieridae
- Subfamily: Pseudopontiinae; Reuter, 1896
- Genus: Pseudopontia; Plötz, 1870

Synonyms
- Globiceps C. & R. Felder, 1869; Gonophlebia C. & R. Felder, 1870

= Pseudopontia =

Butterfly genus in family Pieridae

Pseudopontia is a genus of butterflies found only in wet forests of tropical Africa. It is the only genus in the subfamily Pseudopontiinae. It was traditionally thought to contain only one species (monotypic), Pseudopontia paradoxa. However, a recent study showed there are at least five species of Pseudopontia which can be distinguished genetically and by details of wing veins. Each is found primarily in a different part of Africa, though several of the species have overlapping geographic distributions.

It is considered paradoxical because, despite being a true butterfly (Papilionoidea), its antennae do not have the characteristic clubbed ends which are otherwise diagnostic of butterflies (Rhopalocera).

== Species ==
- Pseudopontia paradoxa R. Felder, 1869; found in rainforests in Cameroon, Nigeria, Côte d'Ivoire, Ghana, and Gabon
- Pseudopontia australis F.A. Dixey, 1923 (formerly considered a subspecies); found in Democratic Republic of the Congo (Kinshasa), Congo (Brazzaville), and eastern Gabon, usually at low elevation
- Pseudopontia gola S. Safian and K. Mitter, 2011; found in Sierra Leone and Liberia in far western Africa
- Pseudopontia mabira K. Mitter and S. Collins, 2011; found in central Africa: in Uganda and Democratic Republic of the Congo within about 5 degrees latitude north and south of the Equator
- Pseudopontia zambezi K. Mitter and W. De Prins, 2011; found in riverine forests in the southern African highlands: in Democratic Republic of the Congo, Zambia, and Angola, at elevations over 800 m above sea level
