= Mary Pulling =

New Zealand headmistress

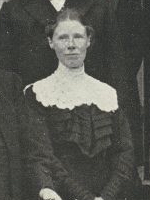
Pulling in 1904

Mary Etheldred Pulling (1871–1951) was a New Zealand headmistress, writer and anchoress. She was born in Belchamp St Paul, Essex, England in 1871.

At the invitation of the Anglican bishop of Auckland, Moore Richard Neligan, she came to New Zealand in 1904 to establish a church school for girls.

By the time of her retirement in 1926 Mary Pulling had firmly established Diocesan High School for Girls on a firm footing with a growing roll, sound finances, and a high academic reputation.

From 1930 she lived a reclusive life as Anchoress Mary Etheldred in the Waikato town of Cambridge, devoting her time to intercessional prayer and spiritual counselling for those who requested it.

Towards the end of her life she suffered from cerebral arteriosclerosis, and died at Tokanui Hospital, Te Awamutu, on 24 March 1951.

She never married and apparently had no close relatives in New Zealand.

She designed a Gothic styled entrance arch for the Anglican portion of the Symonds Street Cemetery in Auckland.

This may have been the first work of architecture by a woman in New Zealand - it was constructed in 1910 and demolished in 1968 when the cemetery was altered during the construction of the motorway system - no other architectural work by her is known at present.
