= Platen (surname) =

Platen is a German-language surname. People with the surname include:

- Angelika Platen (born 1942), German photographer
- August von Platen-Hallermünde (1796–1835), German poet and dramatist
- Baltzar von Platen (inventor) (1898–1984), Swedish inventor
- Dubislav Friedrich von Platen (1714–1787), Prussian officer in Frederick the Great's army
- Filip Julius Bernhard von Platen (1732–1805), Swedish-German politician and field marshal
- Flockina von Platen (1903–1984), German actress
- Carl Constantin Platen (1843–1899, German naturalist and collector
