= Bob Platts =

English footballer

Personal information
- Full name: Robert Platts
- Date of birth: 21 February 1900
- Place of birth: Anston, England
- Date of death: 1975 (aged 74–75)
- Position: Winger

Senior career*
Years	Team	Apps	(Gls)
1919–1920	Anston United		
1920–1925	Notts County	50	(3)
1925–1926	Southend United	0	(0)
1927	Heanor Town		
1928	British Celanese		
1929	Nottingham Co-operative Dairy		
Total		50	(3)
- * Club domestic league appearances and goals

Robert Platts (21 February 1900 – 1975) was an English footballer who played in the Football League for Notts County.
