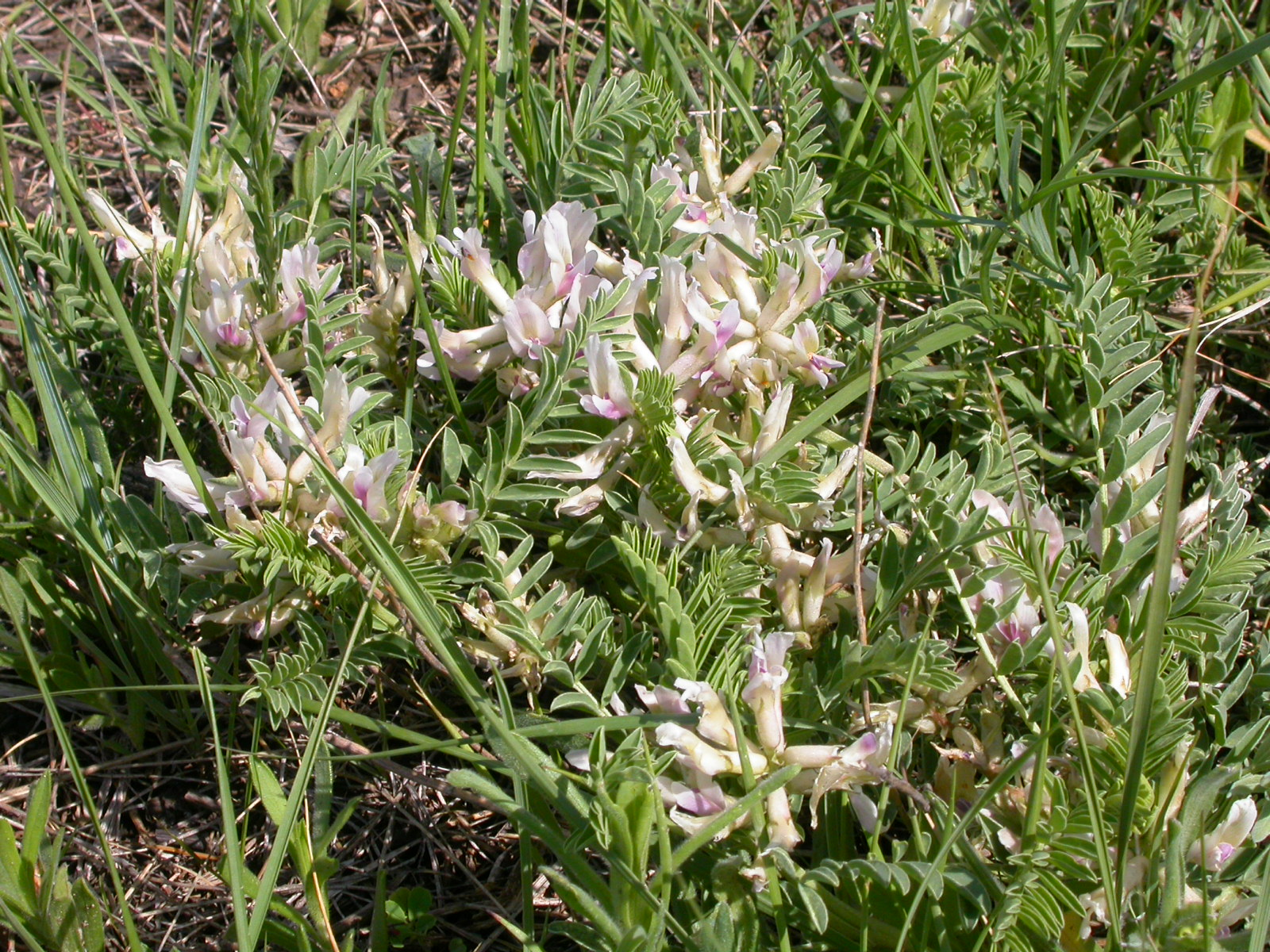

Conservation status
- Least Concern (IUCN 3.1)

- Secure (NatureServe)

Scientific classification
- Kingdom: Plantae
- Clade: Tracheophytes
- Clade: Angiosperms
- Clade: Eudicots
- Clade: Rosids
- Order: Fabales
- Family: Fabaceae
- Subfamily: Faboideae
- Genus: Astragalus
- Species: A. crassicarpus

Binomial name
- Astragalus crassicarpus Nutt.

= Astragalus crassicarpus =

Species of legume

Astragalus crassicarpus, known as ground plum or buffalo plum, is a perennial species of flowering plant in the legume family, Fabaceae, native to North America. It was described in 1813. The fruit is edible and was used by Native Americans as food and horse medicine. It is a host of afranius duskywing larvae. It is also known as groundplum milkvetch and pomme de prairie.

== Description ==
The species is 1 to 2 feet tall with pinkish purple flowers and edible fruit pods. The plant grows from thick taproots and several long hairy stems lay on the ground. Its leaves are alternate, between 4–13 cm long, each with 15–27 leaflets that are either elliptic or oblong. The flowers grow in elongated groups among the leaves and the fleshy fruit, measuring 1.5 to 2.5 cm in width, is round. It blooms from May to June.

Astragalus crassicarpus is known as ground plum, though it shares this name with some other species in the genus Astragalus such as Astragalus plattensis. The two species are sometimes confused, though in general, the fruiting pods of A. crassicarpus are glabrous (hairless) while those of A. plattensis are hairy.

== Distribution and habitat ==
Astragalus crassicarpus grows primarily in the Great Plains of Canada and the United States, from British Columbia east to Ontario and south to Texas. It has been recorded as far east as Will County, Illinois, but whether it was originally native to this area or an introduction is unknown.

Ground plums grow in sunny drained soil. They can be found in prairies, pastures, limestone out-croppings and rocky open woods throughout the Mississippi Valley. It is common throughout much of the southern parts of its range.

== Cultivation ==
Ground plum has a large and deep taproot. It can only be grown from seed and it is also slow to germinate. The ripe seeds are glossy black with a very hard seed coat.

== Edibility ==
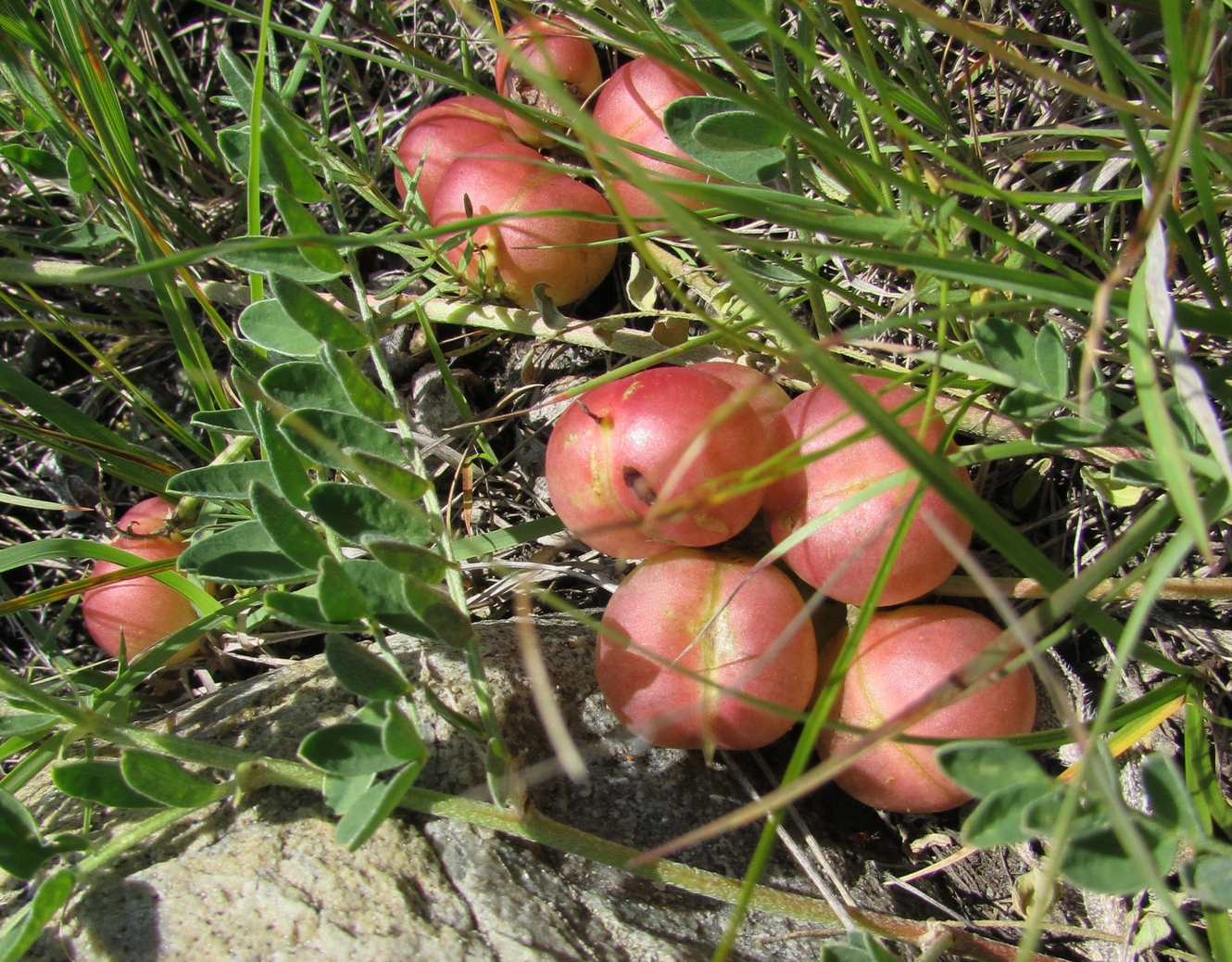
Ground plums

The name crassicarpus (from both Latin and Greek) means "thick fruited" which refers to the plant's fleshy fruits. The Dakota people named the plant "pte ta wote" (buffalo food), while the Omaha and Ponca people gave the plant two names, "tdika shande" and "wamide wenigthe" (something to go with seed). The Omaha and Ponca used the plant to prepare corn seed for planting. The Dakota ate the fruit right off of the plant and the Pawnee ate them to sate their thirst. The fruit dries out once the seeds ripen, making them become tough and inedible by midsummer. It was used as medicine for horses by the Lakota people.

It is a food source for sheep and cattle. Although the fruit is edible, the rest of the plant is poisonous. The immature fruit can be eaten raw, cooked, or pickled. Its fruit tastes like a sweet pea and they were eaten by the original inhabitants of the prairie, though the raw fruit has been described as "hardly appetizing". The cooked fruits taste like string beans. Similar looking species are completely poisonous. The afranius duskywing butterfly (Erynnis afranius) uses the plant as a host for its larvae.
