= Una Platts =

New Zealand teacher, art historian and artist (1908–2005)

- Born: 1908; Wellington
- Died: 6 July 2005; Takapuna
- Education: Auckland University College
- Occupations: Art historian, teacher

Una Platts (1908 – 6 July 2005) was a New Zealand artist and one of the country's first art historians.

== Life and career ==
Platts was born in Wellington, New Zealand, in 1908. Her father was Charles Oakley Platts, a government official; her mother was Flora Galbraith. The family later moved to Auckland where Platts attended the Diocesan School for Girls and Auckland University College from 1926 to 1927. On graduating, she began work as a teacher.

In the 1950s, Platts worked for the Auckland Art Gallery Toi o Tāmaki curating a series of exhibitions showcasing colonial artists and the early history of Auckland. Her most notable work, Nineteenth century New Zealand artists: a guide and handbook, published in 1980, was the result of 26 years of research and is considered the finest single source of information on early New Zealand artists.

Notable New Zealand artists Colin McCahon and Olivia Spencer Bower painted her portrait, and both these artworks plus her own work is held in the collection of Auckland Art Gallery Toi o Tāmaki.

Platts died in the Auckland region on 6 July 2005.

== Works ==
- The Lively Capital: Auckland 1840–1865, Avon Fine Prints, Christchurch, 1971
- Nineteenth Century New Zealand Artists: A Guide & Handbook. Christchurch: Avon Fine Prints. 1980.
