= Bellatti =

Coordinates: 12°39′N 78°00′E

- village
- Interactive map of Bellatti
- Country: India
- State: Karnataka
- District: Gadag
- Talukas: Shirhatti

Government
  - Body: Gram panchayat

Population (2016)
  - Total: 15,000

Languages
  - Official: Kannada
- Time zone: UTC+5:30 (IST)
- ISO 3166 code: IN-KA
- Vehicle registration: KA
- Website: karnataka.gov.in

Bellatti is a village in the southern state of Karnataka, India. It is located in the Shirhatti taluk of Gadag district in Karnataka.

== Demographics ==
As of 2001 India census, Bellatti had a population of 6558 with 3321 males and 3237 females.

== See also ==
- Gadag
- Districts of Karnataka
