= Platte River State Park =

Park in Nebraska, USA

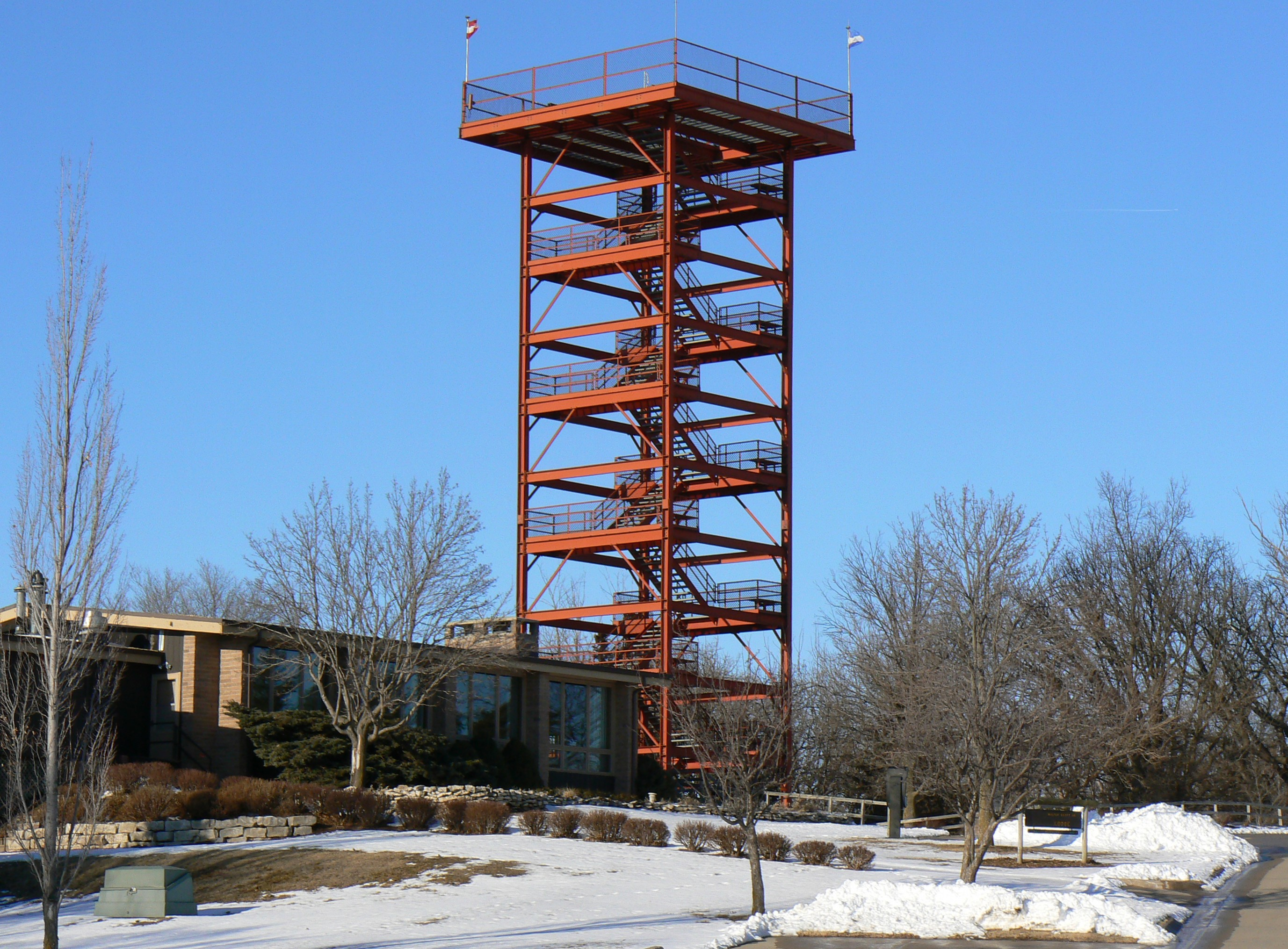

- Location within Nebraska
- Location: Cass County, Nebraska, United States
- Nearest city: Louisville, Nebraska
- Coordinates: 40°59′37″N 96°12′30″W
- Area: 425.5 acres (172.2 ha)
- Elevation: 1,024 ft (312 m)
- Established: 1982
- Administrator: Nebraska Game and Parks Commission
- Designation: Nebraska state park
- Website: Official website

Platte River State Park is a public recreation area encompassing 453 acres (183 ha) on the southern bluffs of the Platte River two miles (3.2 km) west of Louisville, Nebraska. The state park has a relatively steep, rolling topography compared to the surrounding region, with much of it forested.

== History ==
On August 13, 1982, the park was created from three formerly separate areas: Harriet Harding Campfire Girls Camp, Camp Esther K. Newman, and a woodland tract of 104 acres (42 ha). Vintage cabins from the earlier campgrounds are still in use.

== Activities and amenities ==
Two observation towers provide views of the Platte River Valley; the taller rises 85 feet (26 m) above its base. The park has a spray park, tennis courts and ten miles (16 km) of hiking trails. Guided trail rides are offered in summer. Jenny Newman Lake provides fishing opportunities for those under 16 years of age and their adult supervisors. Paddleboats are offered for rent. The park has a visitor center, arts and crafts center, picnicking areas, ballfield, tent camping, tepees, and cabins. A rifle, trap, and archery shooting range is part of the Roger G. Sykes Outdoor Heritage Complex.

In 2016, the state announced a $34 million program to upgrade visitor experiences at four public recreation areas in the Platte River Valley. The improvements announced for Platte River State Park include the addition of new mountain biking and other trails and improved river access for canoers and kayakers.
