= Plait =

Plait may refer to:

- Plait, also called a braid, intertwined strands of, for example, textile or hair
- Plait, now called a pleat, a fold of fabric, used in clothing and upholstery
- Plait (gastropod), a fold in the columella of a gastropod mollusc
- Plaiting in basketry
- Phil Plait, American astronomer, skeptic and blogger
