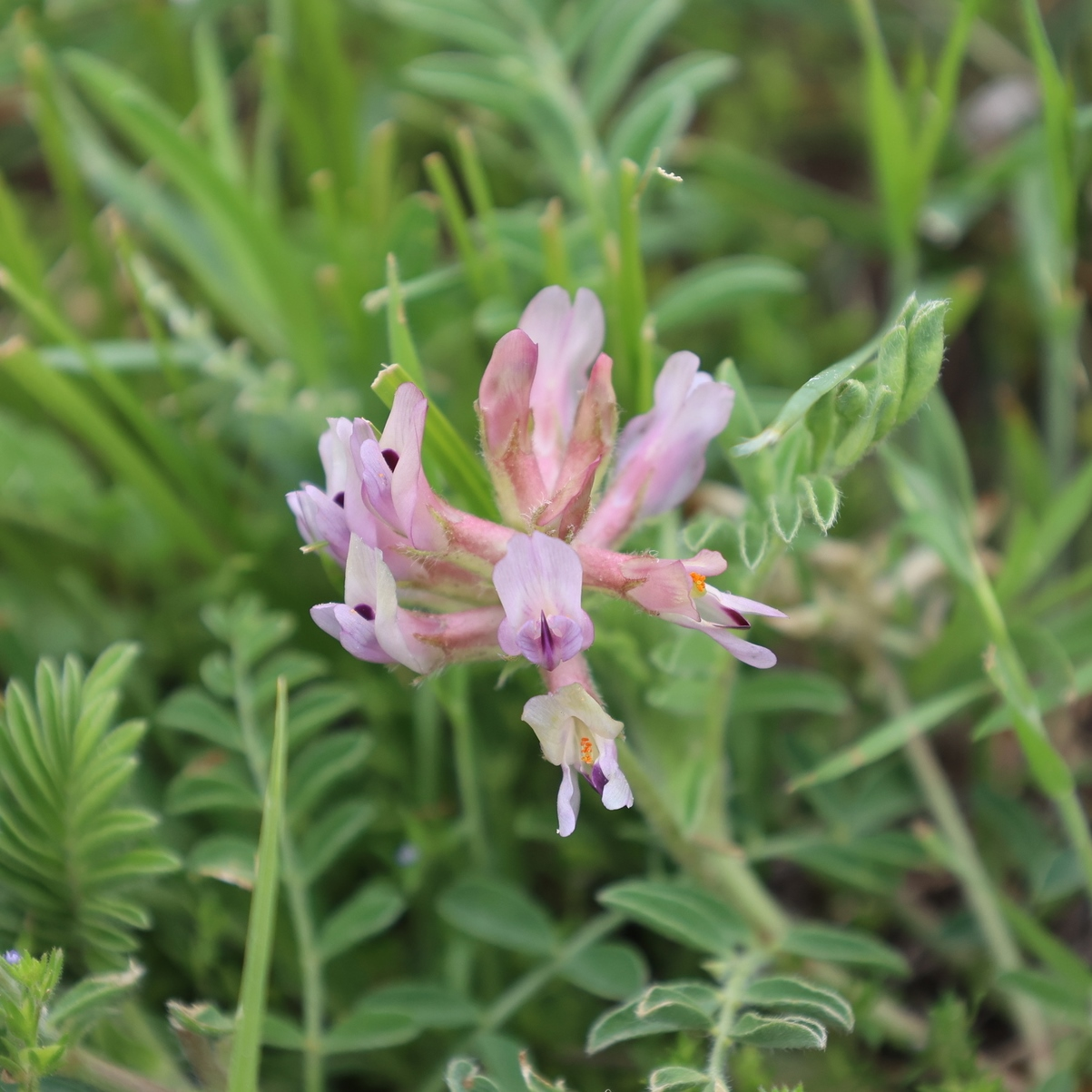

Conservation status
- Secure (NatureServe)

Scientific classification
- Kingdom: Plantae
- Clade: Tracheophytes
- Clade: Angiosperms
- Clade: Eudicots
- Clade: Rosids
- Order: Fabales
- Family: Fabaceae
- Subfamily: Faboideae
- Genus: Astragalus
- Species: A. plattensis

Binomial name
- Astragalus plattensis Nutt.

= Astragalus plattensis =

Species of legume

Astragalus plattensis, the Platte River milkvetch, is a species of flowering plant in the legume family, Fabaceae, native to North America. It was named in 1838. Its range includes the Great Plains of the United States, from southern Montana and North Dakota south to central Texas.

Astragalus plattensis is also sometimes called ground plum, a name it shares with some other species in the genus Astragalus, particularly Astragalus crassicarpus. The two species are sometimes confused, though in general, the fruiting pods of A. crassicarpus are glabrous (hairless) while those of A. plattensis are hairy.
