= Platte (surname) =

Platte is the surname of the following people:

- Al Platte (1890–1976), American baseball player
- Ardeth Platte (1936–2020), American Dominican Religious Sister and anti-nuclear activist
- Felix Platte (born 1996), German football striker
- Ray Platte (1925–1963), American NASCAR driver
- Rudolf Platte (1904–1984), German actor
