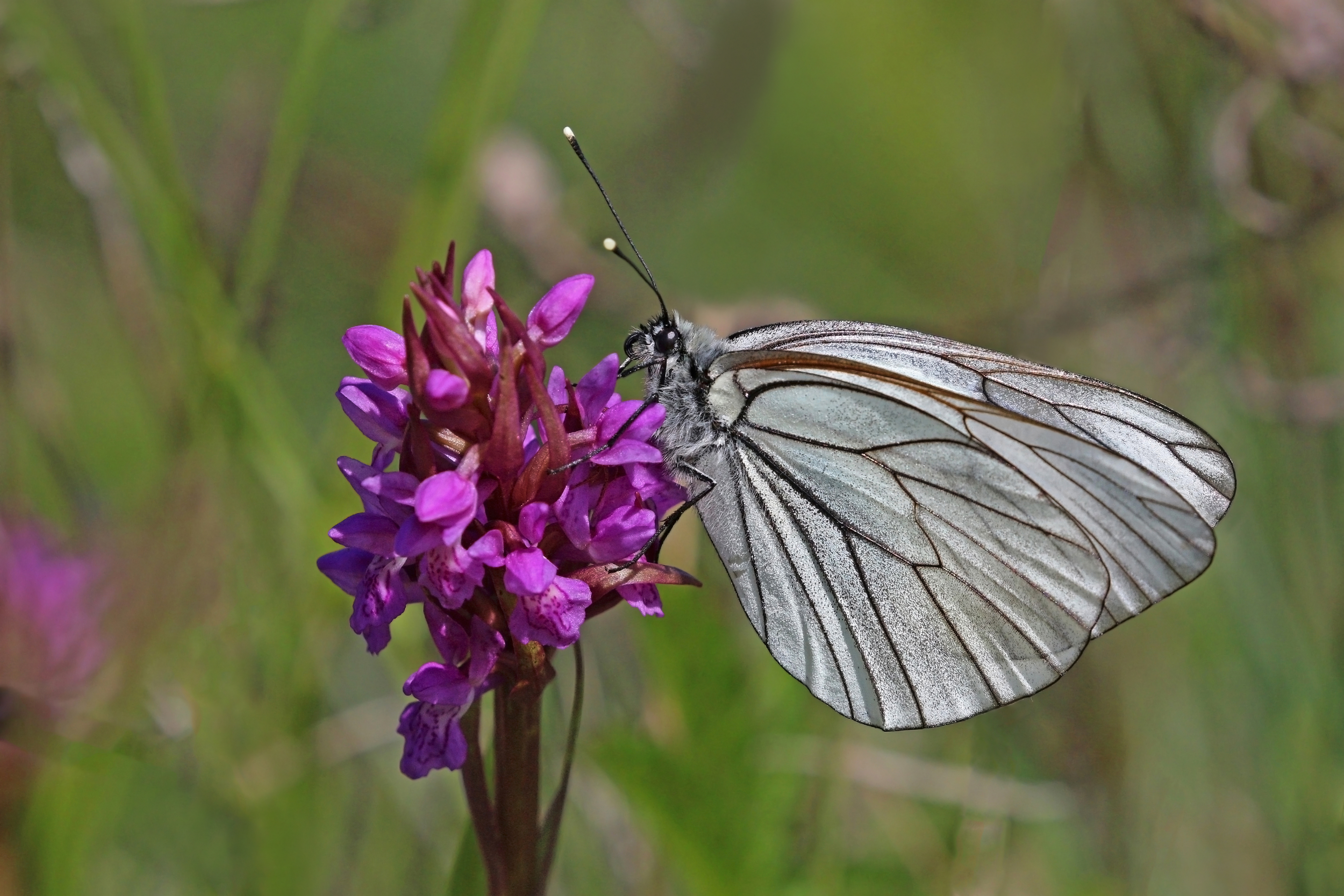
- Black-veined white (Aporia crataegi) male

Scientific classification
- Kingdom: Animalia
- Phylum: Arthropoda
- Clade: Pancrustacea
- Class: Insecta
- Order: Lepidoptera
- Superfamily: Papilionoidea
- Family: Pieridae; Swainson, 1820

Subfamilies
- Dismorphiinae; Pseudopontiinae; Pierinae; Coliadinae

Diversity
- 76 genera 1,051 species

= Pieridae =

Butterfly family in superfamily Papilionoidea

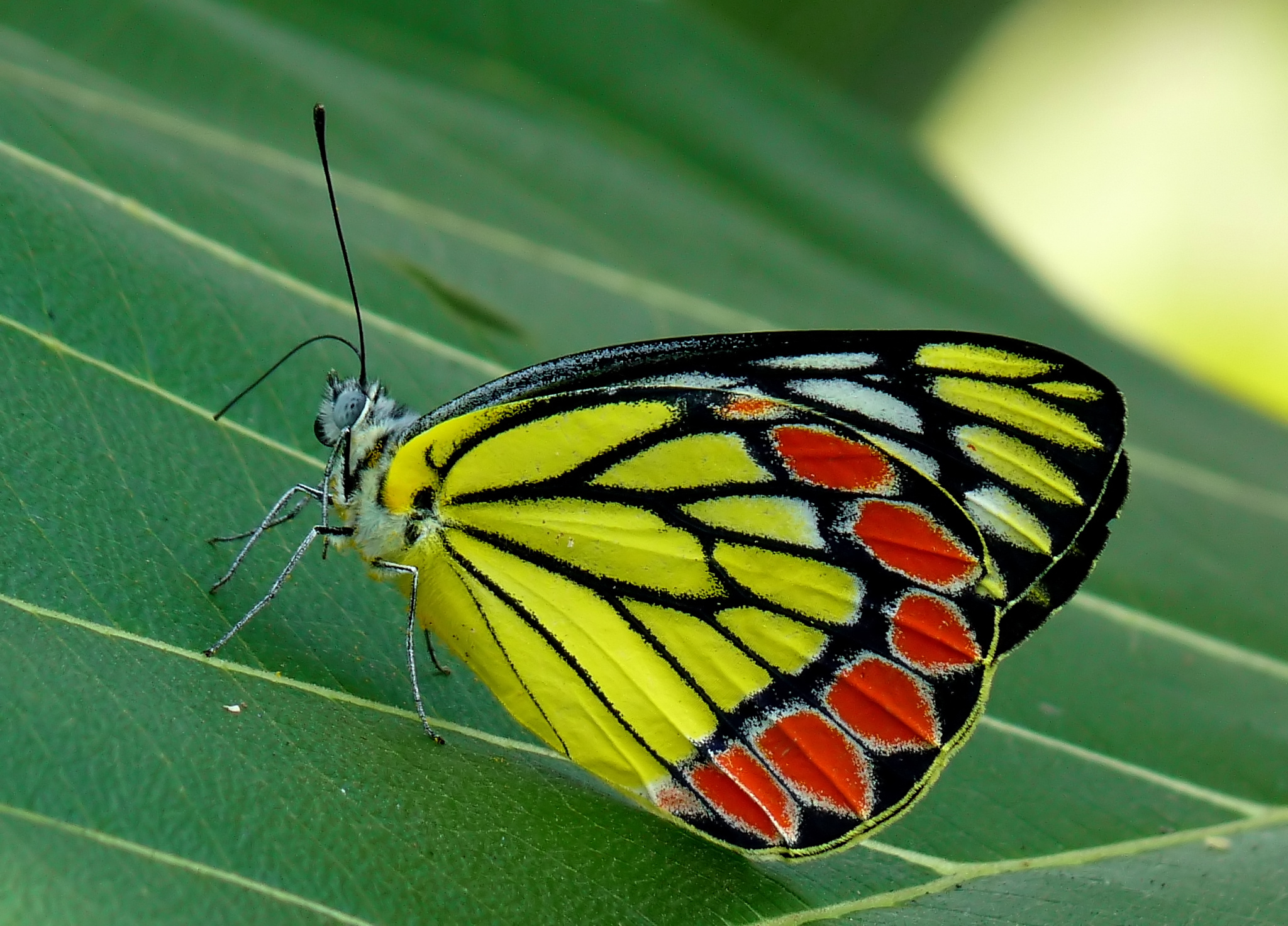
Common Jezebel (Delias eucharis)

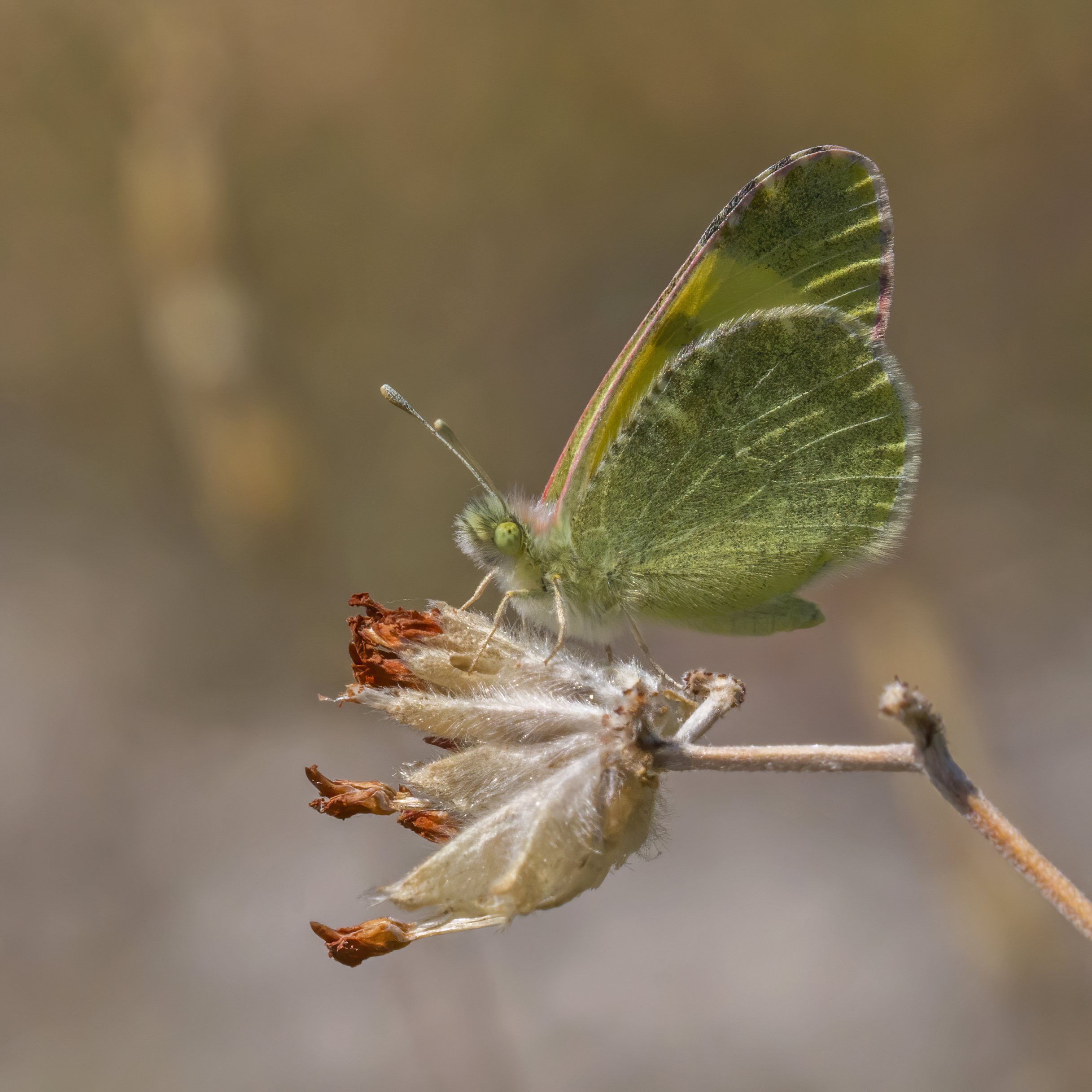
Eastern greenish black-tip (Euchloe penia)

The Pieridae are a large family of butterflies with about 76 genera containing about 1,100 species, mostly from tropical Africa and tropical Asia with some varieties in the more northern regions of North America and Eurasia. Most pierid butterflies are white, yellow, or orange in coloration, often with black spots. The pigments that give the distinct coloring to these butterflies are derived from waste products in the body and are a characteristic of this family. The family was created by William Swainson in 1820.

The name "butterfly" is believed to have originated from a member of this family, the brimstone, Gonepteryx rhamni, which was called the "butter-coloured fly" by early British naturalists.

The sexes usually differ, often in the pattern or number of the black markings.

The larvae (caterpillars) of a few of these species, such as Pieris brassicae and Pieris rapae, commonly seen in gardens, feed on brassicas, and are notorious agricultural pests.

Males of many species exhibit gregarious mud-puddling behavior when they may imbibe salts from moist soils.

== Morphology ==
The Pieridae have the radial vein on the forewing with three or four branches and rarely with five branches. The forelegs are well developed in both sexes, unlike in the Nymphalidae, and the tarsal claws are bifid, unlike in the Papilionidae.

Like the Papilionidae, the Pieridae also have their pupae held at an angle by a silk girdle, but running at the first abdominal segment, unlike the thoracic girdle seen in the Papilionidae. But some species such as the madrone butterfly that belong to this family do not shows the presence of this abdominal silk girdle.

== Subfamilies ==
The Pieridae are generally divided into these four subfamilies:

- Dismorphiinae (six genera), mostly Neotropical; this group includes several mimetic species. The host plants are in the family Fabaceae.
- Pierinae (55 genera), whites, yellows, and orange-tips; many of these species are strongly migratory. Host plants are in the families Capparidaceae, Brassicaceae, Santalaceae, and Loranthaceae.
- Coliadinae (14 genera), sulphurs or yellows; many of these species are sexually dimorphic. Some, such as Colias, have wing patterns that are visible only under ultraviolet.
- Pseudopontiinae includes only the genus Pseudopontia, which was formerly considered monotypic. Its type species—formerly the sole species in this subfamily—Pseudopontia paradoxa, is endemic to West Africa.

According to the molecular phylogenetic study of Braby et al. (2005), sister group relationships among Pieridae subfamilies are ((Dismorphiinae + Pseudopontiinae) + (Coliadinae + Pierinae)).

== Some common species ==
- Brimstone, Gonepteryx rhamni
- California dogface, Zerene eurydice
- Catalina orangetip, Anthocharis cethura catalina
- Cloudless sulphur, Phoebis sennae
- Clouded yellow, Colias croceus
- Orange tip, Anthocharis cardamines
- Psyche butterfly, Leptosia nina

== Some pest species ==
- Colias eurytheme, alfalfa butterfly or orange sulphur

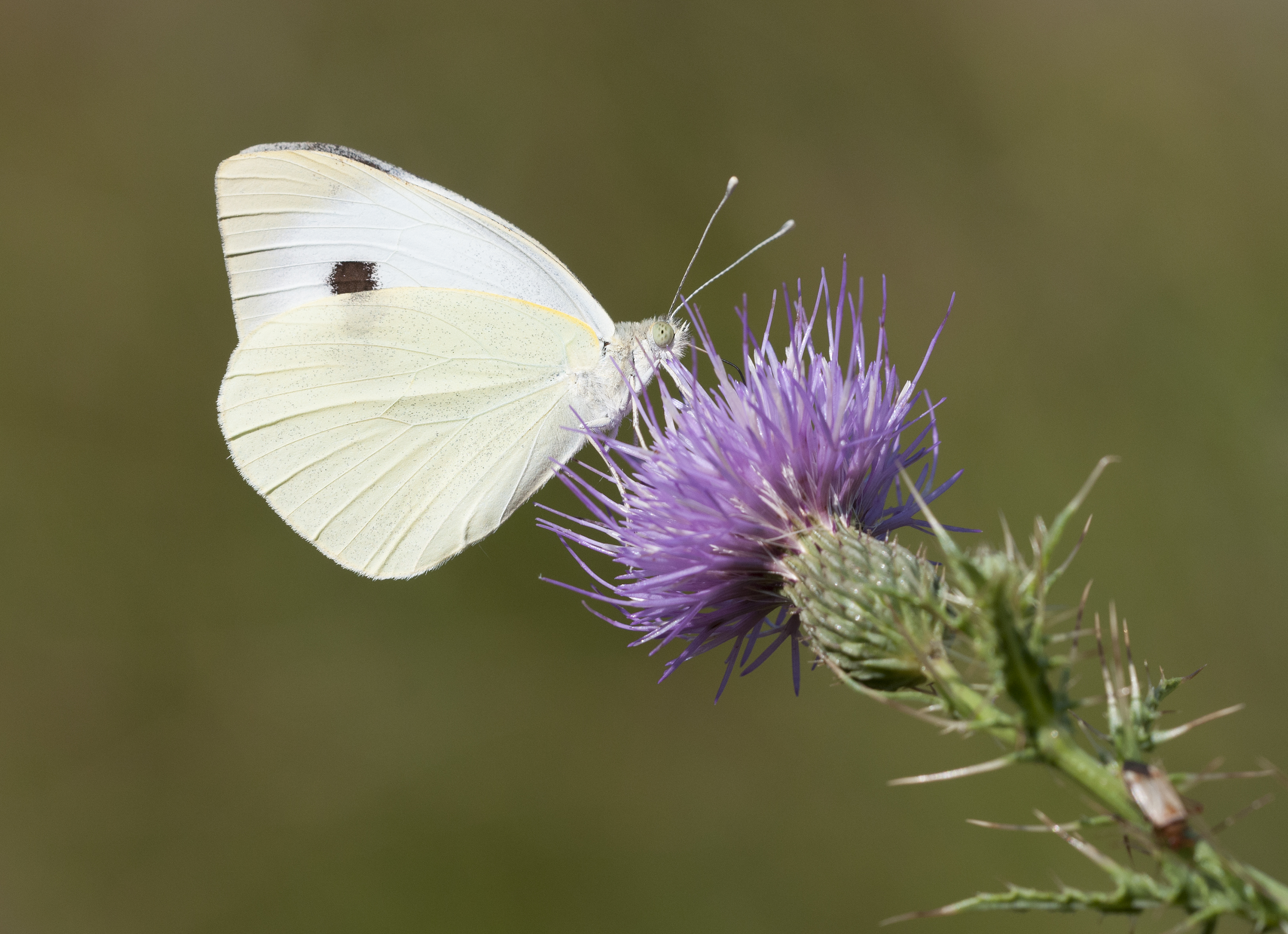
Pieris brassicae, large white or cabbage white

- Colias philodice clouded sulphur
- Pieris rapae, small white or cabbage white
- Pieris brassicae, large white or cabbage white
