= Bob Nolan =

Canadian-American singer, songwriter, and actor (1908–1980)

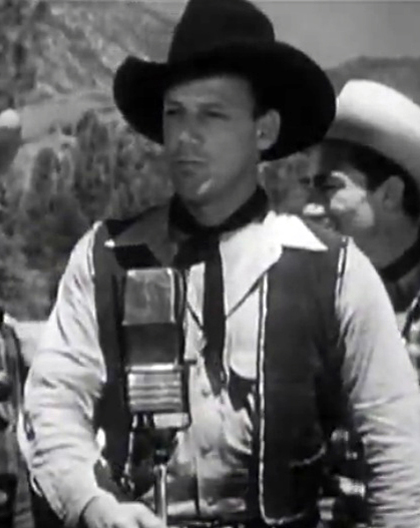
- Bob Nolan in Lights of Old Santa Fe (1944)

Background information
- Born: Clarence Robert Nobles; April 13, 1908; Winnipeg, Manitoba, Canada
- Died: June 16, 1980 (aged 72) Newport Beach, California, United States
- Genres: Western, country
- Occupations: Singer-songwriter actor
- Years active: 1933–1949

Bob Nolan (born Clarence Robert Nobles; April 13, 1908 – June 16, 1980, name changed to Robert Clarence Nobles in 1929) was a Canadian-born American singer, songwriter, and actor. He was a founding member of the Sons of the Pioneers, and composer of numerous Country music and Western music songs, including the standards "Cool Water" and "Tumbling Tumbleweeds." He is generally regarded as one of the finest Western songwriters of all time. As an actor and singer, he appeared in scores of Western films.

== Early years ==
Nolan was born April 13, 1908, in Winnipeg, Manitoba, Canada to Harry Nobles and Flora Elizabeth Hussey Nobles. The couple separated in 1915, and Flora raised her two little boys in Winnipeg.

In the summer of 1916, Flora temporarily moved her children to her husband's parents' home in Hatfield Point, New Brunswick, but due to the machinations of his father, Nolan never saw his mother again.

In the summer of 1919, Nolan went to live with his aunt in Boston, Massachusetts. There he attended The Belmont School until 1921, when, at the age of thirteen, he moved to Tucson, Arizona, to live with his father Harry, a United States Army officer. He attended Safford Junior High School until 1922, then transferred to Roskruge Junior High. In high school he was an average student, was a member of the Arion Club choral group, and excelled in athletics. He graduated from Tucson High School in May 1928.

On July 7, 1928, less than two months after he graduated high school, Nolan married his high school sweetheart, 16-year-old Tennie Pearl Fields. Thirteen months later, daughter Roberta Irene was born to them, but the marriage foundered almost from the beginning.

After he left school, Nolan drifted around the country, finding work where he could and always writing songs. He took a lifeguard job in Los Angeles in 1929. His father had changed his name to Nolan and it was as Bob Nolan that he began a career as a singer on the Chautauqua tent-show circuit and as a lifeguard in Santa Monica.

== Sons of the Pioneers ==
In September 1931, Nolan answered a classified ad in The Los Angeles Herald-Examiner that read "Yodeler for old-time act, to travel. Tenor preferred." The band was The Rocky Mountaineers, led by a young singer named Leonard Slye, who would later change his name to Roy Rogers. After listening to the tall, slender, tanned Nolan sing and yodel, Slye hired Nolan on the spot. Although he stayed with the group only a short time, he stayed in touch with Slye.

In 1934, Nolan co-founded the Sons of the Pioneers with Leonard Slye and Tim Spencer. The singing group became very popular and produced numerous recordings for Columbia, Decca, and RCA Victor.

The Sons of the Pioneers began performing Nolan's original songs on a nationally syndicated radio show. "Tumbling Tumbleweeds" became their signature tune and a Western standard, and was one of the first songs the group recorded when it signed with Decca in 1934. In the coming years, The Sons of the Pioneers recorded many other Nolan songs, including "Way Out There", "There's a Roundup in the Sky", "One More Ride", and "Cool Water", which became one of the group's most famous recordings.

In 1937, Leonard Slye took the name Roy Rogers and was forced by his new employers, Republic Pictures, to leave the group. The Pioneers continued to function as a cooperative partnership, with no formal leader, until they rejoined Rogers at Republic in 1941. Nolan reluctantly became the group's front man because his face and voice were the most recognizable in the group.

== Film career ==
In 1934, Nolan began his career in film as the singing voice for Ken Maynard in the 1934 film In Old Santa Fe. In 1935, the Sons of the Pioneers appeared in their first full-length Western movie The Old Homestead. That same year they signed with Columbia Pictures to provide the music for the western films of Charles Starrett. The deal was far from lucrative (they were paid $33 apiece to appear in each film, and Nolan and Spencer each received $10 for every original song), but the worldwide exposure was beneficial to the group.

Nolan appeared in at least 88 Western films, first for Columbia Pictures and later with cowboy stars Gene Autry and Roy Rogers. With the Sons of the Pioneers, he made guest appearances in high-budget films like Hollywood Canteen and Rhythm on the Range with Bing Crosby. He also appeared in the Walt Disney short, Melody Time.

Nolan had strong featured roles in the Charles Starrett westerns, often playing the second lead. Columbia's president Harry Cohn took an interest in Nolan, and issued three edicts: he ordered Nolan to have his nose fixed; he decided that Nolan's singing voice in the early Starrett pictures was not a polished baritone and should be dubbed by other singers; and he wanted to groom Nolan to star in his own movies. Nolan grudgingly went along with Cohn's first two directives but turned down the chance to be a movie star. Movie fans (who knew Nolan's singing voice from records and radio) urged Columbia to use Nolan's own voice, which was finally heard on screen in 1940.

In 1941, Columbia disbanded the close-knit Starrett unit temporarily, freeing the Sons of the Pioneers to join Roy Rogers at Republic Pictures. Nolan and the group appeared as his musical sidekicks in numerous films through 1948. Their last film together was Night Time in Nevada. In many of these films, Nolan was featured in prominent supporting roles with significant dialogue. Republic once offered Nolan his own cowboy film series, which he declined.

On June 11, 1942, Nolan married Clara Brown, whose slight stature led to her being nicknamed P-Nuts. They met at the Columbia Drugstore on Sunset and Gower near the Columbia Studio lot. P-Nuts had come to Hollywood in search of stardom, but found work instead at the drugstore, where Nolan and the Sons of the Pioneers frequently had lunch and where Nolan would work on his song lyrics.

== Later years ==
In 1949, Nolan retired from show business and began a semi-secluded life as a songwriter. He returned to record with the Sons of the Pioneers in 1956, at the insistence of RCA Victor executives who wanted to capitalize on Nolan's TV exposure in the old Rogers westerns.

In 1971, Nolan was inducted into the Nashville Songwriters Hall of Fame. In 1980, at the age of 72, Nolan recorded his last LP album Bob Nolan: The Sound of a Pioneer.

Nolan died on June 16, 1980, in Newport Beach, California, of a heart attack. At his request, his ashes were scattered in Red Rock Canyon in the Nevada desert.

On July 27, 1980, many of his friends and former colleagues gathered at Rex Allen's Diamond X ranch in Calabasas, California, to honor him musically. Among those who attended the memorial were Roy Rogers and Dale Evans, the current Sons of the Pioneers, and the Reinsmen.

== Honours and awards ==
- 1971 Western Heritage Wrangler Award from the National Cowboy Hall of Fame
- 1972 BMI Special Citation of Achievement for "Cool Water"
- 1976 Gene Autry Award
- 1976 Hollywood Walk of Fame Award
- 1977 William F. Cody Award
- 1979 National Western Film Heritage Award
- 1980 Country Music Hall of Fame Country Music Association Award
- 1984 New Brunswick Country Music Hall of Fame Award
- 1986 Grammy Award for "Cool Water"
- 1993 Canadian Country Music Association Hall of Fame
- 1994 Western Music Association Hall of Fame Award
- 2005 Canadian Songwriters Hall of Fame Award for "Tumbling Tumbleweeds"
- 2005 Canadian Songwriters Hall of Fame Award for "Cool Water"
- 2011 American Cowboy Culture Award for Western Music.
- 2012 Manitoba Country Music Association Hall of Fame Award

== Songs ==
- "All the Way"
- "Always Rollin' Home"
- "Annie, Dear, I'm Called Away"
- "April"
- "At the Rainbow's End"
- "Autumn Reverie"
- "Barnyard Jubilee"
- "The Beauty of Your Smile"
- "Biscuit Blues"
- "Blue Prairie"
- "The Boss is Hangin' Out a Rainbow"
- "Bound for the Rio Grande"
- "The Broken Heart Waltz"
- "Bronco Pal"
- "Campfires of Heaven"
- "Chant of the Plains"
- "Chant of the Wanderer"
- "Chico Rotico"
- "Close to Heaven"
- "Cody of the Pony Express"
- "Cool Water"
- "Cottage in the Clouds"
- "Covered Wagon"
- "A Cowboy Has to Sing"
- "Coyote's Serenade"
- "Crossroads"
- "Daddy's on the Rainbow"
- "Desolation"
- "The Devil's Great Grandson"
- "Donde esta el mio?"
- "Don't Expect Me Home in the Morning"
- "Echoes from the Hills"
- "Empty Arms"
- "A Faded Flower Lei"
- "Far Enchanted Isle"
- "Five Little Miles
- "The Flower I Blessed for You"
- "Following the Sun All Day"
- "For the Love of You"
- "Frontiers"
- "Glory of the Lamb"
- "Goofus Stomp"
- "Grab Your Saddle Horn and Blow"
- "The Grey Time"
- "Half Way 'Round the World"
- "Hangin' Blues"
- "Happy Cowboy"
- "Hasta la vista"
- "Have You?"
- "He Walks with the Wild and the Lonely"
- "Heaven is My Island"
- "Heavenly Aeroplane"
- "Hello 'Way Up There"
- "Here is My Helping Hand"
- "Hi Diddle Diddle He Played the Fiddle"
- "High Sierras"
- "Hold that Critter Down"
- "The Home Corral"
- "I'm Constantly Dreaming of You"
- "I Follow the Stream"
- "I Still Do"
- "I Wonder if She Waits for Me Tonight"
- "If You are Willing"
- "In the Wind of Time"
- "In This Room"
- "It's a Lie!"
- "King's Highway"
- "Lazy"
- "Let Me Share Your Name"
- "Let's Pretend"
- "Letter Marked 'Unclaimed'"
- "The Lighthouse of the Lord"
- "Little Spaceman"
- "Lone Buckaroo"
- "Lonely Little Room"
- "Lord, You Made the Cowboy Happy"
- "Love Ever Green"
- "Love Song of the Waterfall"
- "Montana"
- "Moonlight on the Prairie"
- "Move On, You Lazy Cattle"
- "My Boy"
- "My Daddy"
- "My Heart in Deep Despair"
- "My Love's a Voice in the Green Willow Tree"
- "My Mistress the Desert"
- "My Old Pal, Pal of Mine"
- "The Mystery of His Way"
- "Ne Ha Neé"
- "Night Falls on the Prairie"
- "A No-Good Son-of-a-Gun"
- "Oh I Miss You So, My Darling"
- "Old Forgotten Trails"
- "Old Home Town"
- "On the Rhythm Range"
- "One More Ride"
- "Open Range Ahead"
- "The Other Side of Somewhere"
- "Outlaws"
- "Pali Wind"
- "Parting"
- "A Prayer for Christmas Time"
- "The Ranch Next Door"
- "Redwood Trees"
- "Relative Man"
- "Remember Me"
- "Ridin' Home"
- "Rise and Shine"
- "River Robin"
- "Rocky Road in the Rockies"
- "Rocky Roads"
- "Round-Up in the Sky"
- "Round-Up Time is Over"
- "Saddle the Sun"
- "Saddle Your Worries to the Wind"
- "Sage Brush Sea A Sailor Dreams"
- "Sandman Lullaby"
- "Send Him Home to Me"
- "Shadow on the Wall"
- "Shadows of the Wildwood"
- "She ain't What She Used to Be"
- "Shootin' My Way Through Town"
- "Sing as You Work"
- "Sir Tumbleweed"
- "Sky Ball Paint"
- "Slumber Time on the Range"
- "Someone I Used to Know"
- "Song of the Bandit"
- "Song of the Prairie"
- "Song of the Rover"
- "Song of the Vaqueros"
- "Starlightin' Time in Texas"
- "Still Water Pool"
- "Stop!"
- "Stray Wind"
- "A Summer Night's Rain"
- "Sweet Laredo Lou"
- "That Cloud"
- "They're Gone"
- "Things are Never What They Seem"
- "This Ain't the Same Old Range"
- "This Old White Mule of Mine"
- "Three Friends Have I"
- "Three Guesses"
- "Till You Return"
- "To Will Rogers"
- "The Touch of God's Hand"
- "Trail Dreamin'"
- "Trail Herdin' Cowboy"
- "Trav'lin' with the Sun"
- "Tree"
- "Tumbleweed Trail"
- "Tumbling Leaves"
- "Tumbling Tumbleweeds"
- "Vagabond Whirlwinds"
- "Volvere a pasar por aqui"
- "Wandering"
- "Watching the Moon Roll By"
- "Way Out There"
- "Welcome to the Spring"
- "Wendin' My Way to Wyoming"
- "The West is in My Soul"
- "What Can We Lose?"
- "What You Gonna Say to Peter?"
- "When He Walks By (How Will I know Him)"
- "When I Leave This World Behind"
- "When Payday Rolls Around"
- "When the Golden Train Comes Down"
- "(When the Prairie Sun Says) Good Mornin'"
- "Who's Gonna Help Me Sing?"
- "Why Don't It Rain?"
- "Why, Tell Me Why?"
- "Wild Pali Wind"
- "Wind"
- "The Wind is Warm Again"
- "The Wonder of It All"
- "You Ain't Heard Nothin' Till You Hear Him Roar!"
- "You Are My Eyes"

== Filmography ==
- Slightly Static (1935, Short) as Member of Sons of the Pioneers (uncredited)
- The Old Homestead (1935) as Member of Sons of the Pioneers
- Way Up Thar (1935, Short) as Band Member
- Gallant Defender (1935) as Singing Nester (uncredited)
- The Mysterious Avenger (1936) as Musician Bob
- Song of the Saddle (1936) as Singer – Sons of the Pioneers (uncredited)
- Rhythm on the Range (1936) as Bob – Sons of the Pioneers (uncredited)
- California Mail (1936) as Bass Player (uncredited)
- The Big Show (1936) as Sons of the Pioneers Bassist (uncredited)
- The Old Corral (1936) as O'Keefe Brother (uncredited)
- The Old Wyoming Trail (1937) as Singing Cowhand (uncredited)
- Outlaws of the Prairie (1937) as Ranger (uncredited)
- The Old Barn Dance (1938) as Singer (uncredited)
- Cattle Raiders (1938) as Member Sons of the Pioneers (uncredited)
- Call of the Rockies (1938) as Band Member
- Law of the Plains (1938) as Band Member
- West of Cheyenne (1938) as Foreman
- South of Arizona (1938) as Bob – Travers Cowhand
- The Colorado Trail (1938) as Himself
- A Feud There Was (1938, Short) (singing voice, uncredited)
- West of the Santa Fe (1938) as Bob
- Rio Grande (1938) as Bob Stevens
- The Thundering West (1939) as Himself (Sons of the Pioneers)
- Texas Stampede (1939) as Himself (Sons of the Pioneers Leader)
- North of the Yukon (1939) as RCMP Const. Bob Cameron
- Spoilers of the Range (1939) as Bob
- Western Caravans (1939) as Bob
- The Man from Sundown (1939) as Bob
- Riders of Black River (1939) as Bob
- Outpost of the Mounties (1939) as Mountie Bob
- The Stranger from Texas (1939) as Deputy
- Two-Fisted Rangers (1939) as Ranch Foreman (Sons of the Pioneers)
- Bullets for Rustlers (1940) as Bob
- Blazing Six Shooters (1940) as Bob
- Texas Stagecoach (1940) as Bob Harper
- The Durango Kid (1940) as Bob
- West of Abilene (1940) as Bob
- Thundering Frontier (1940) as Bob
- The Pinto Kid (1941) as Bob
- Outlaws of the Panhandle (1941) as Bob
- Red River Valley (1941) as Himself (uncredited)
- Man from Cheyenne (1942) as Himself (uncredited)
- South of Santa Fe (1942) as Himself – Sons of the Pioneers (uncredited)
- Sunset on the Desert (1942) as Himself (uncredited)
- Romance on the Range (1942) as Himself
- Sons of the Pioneers (1942) as Himself (as Sons of the Pioneers)
- Call of the Canyon (1942) as Singer, Sons of the Pioneers (uncredited)
- Sunset Serenade (1942) as Bob
- Heart of the Golden West (1942) as Himself
- Ridin' Down the Canyon (1942) as Himself (Leader Sons of the Pioneers)
- Idaho (1943) as Singer – Member Sons of the Pioneers
- King of the Cowboys (1943) as Himself
- Song of Texas (1943) as Himself
- Silver Spurs (1943) as Singer – Member Sons of the Pioneers
- The Man from Music Mountain (1943) as Bob
- Hands Across the Border (1944) as Himself
- Cowboy and the Senorita (1944) as Bob – Sons of the Pioneers
- The Yellow Rose of Texas (1944) as Singer (as Bob Nolan and The Sons of the Pioneers)
- Song of Nevada (1944) as Bob
- San Fernando Valley (1944) as Bob
- Lights of Old Santa Fe (1944) as Bob – Leader Sons of the Pioneers
- Hollywood Canteen (1944) as Himself (uncredited)
- Utah (1945) as Bob
- Bells of Rosarita (1945) as Himself
- Man from Oklahoma (1945) as Singer – Sons of the Pioneers Leader
- Along the Navajo Trail (1945) as Himself – Leader Sons of the Pioneers
- Sunset in El Dorado (1945) as Bob – Leader Sons of the Pioneers
- Don't Fence Me In (1945) as Bob
- Song of Arizona (1946) as Singer – Sons of the Pioneers
- Ding Dong Williams (1946) as Bob – Sons of the Pioneers Leader
- Home on the Range (1946) as Bob
- Rainbow Over Texas (1946) as Himself
- My Pal Trigger (1946) as Himself
- Under Nevada Skies (1946) as Bob
- Roll on Texas Moon (1946) as Bob
- Home in Oklahoma (1946) as Bob – Leader Sons of the Pioneers
- Heldorado (1946) as Himself
- Apache Rose (1947) as Himself
- Hit Parade of 1947 (1947) as Himself
- Bells of San Angelo (1947) as Bob
- Springtime in the Sierras (1947) as Himself
- On the Old Spanish Trail (1947) as Himself
- The Gay Ranchero (1948) as Bob
- Unusual Occupations (1948, Short)
- Under California Stars (1948) as Bob
- Pecos Bill (1948, Short) as Himself (as Bob Nolan and The Sons of the Pioneers)
- Melody Time (1948) as Himself (as Bob Nolan and The Sons of the Pioneers)
- Eyes of Texas (1948) as Bob
- Night Time in Nevada (1948) as Cowhand, Singer (final film role)
