= Outpost of the Mounties =

1939 film by Charles C. Coleman

- Directed by: Charles C. Coleman (as C.C. Coleman Jr.)
- Screenplay by: Charles F. Royal; Paul Franklin
- Story by: Charles F. Royal
- Produced by: Harry L. Decker
- Starring: Charles Starrett
- Cinematography: George Meehan
- Edited by: Charles Nelson
- Color process: Black and white
- Production company: Columbia Pictures
- Distributed by: Columbia Pictures
- Release date: September 13, 1939
- Running time: 63 minutes
- Country: United States
- Language: English

Outpost of the Mounties is a 1939 American Western film directed by Charles C. Coleman and starring Charles Starrett.

== Plot ==
In this adventure, a courageous Canadian Mountie must bring peace to an embattled miner and an unscrupulous trader whose price mark-ups are beginning to hurt the community. They fight to frequently that when the avaricious proprietor is killed, the young man becomes the prime suspect.

== Cast ==
- Charles Starrett as Sergeant Neal Crawford
- Iris Meredith as Norma Daniels
- Stanley Brown as Larry Daniels
- Kenneth MacDonald as R.A. Kirby
- Edmund Cobb as Burke
- Bob Nolan as Mountie Bob
- Lane Chandler as Mountie Cooper
- Dick Curtis as Wade Beaumont
- Alberto Morin as Jacques LaRue (as Albert Morin)
- Hal Taliaferro as Evans
- Pat O'Hara as Inspector Wainwright
- Sons of the Pioneers as Singing Mounties

== See also ==
- List of American films of 1939
