= Western Caravans =

1939 film by Sam Nelson

- Theatrical release poster
- Directed by: Sam Nelson
- Screenplay by: Bennett Cohen
- Produced by: Harry L. Decker
- Starring: Charles Starrett; Iris Meredith; Dick Curtis; Russell Simpson; Wally Wales; Hank Bell
- Cinematography: Allen G. Siegler; Benjamin H. Kline
- Edited by: William A. Lyon
- Production company: Columbia Pictures
- Distributed by: Columbia Pictures
- Release date: June 15, 1939
- Running time: 58 minutes
- Country: United States
- Language: English

Western Caravans is a 1939 American Western film directed by Sam Nelson and written by Bennett Cohen. The film stars Charles Starrett, Iris Meredith, Dick Curtis, Russell Simpson, Wally Wales and Hank Bell. The film was released on June 15, 1939, by Columbia Pictures.

== Cast ==
- Charles Starrett as Jim Carson
- Iris Meredith as Joyce Thompson
- Dick Curtis as Mort Kohler
- Russell Simpson as Winchester Thompson
- Wally Wales as Joel Winters
- Hank Bell as Hank
- Bob Nolan as Bob
- Sammy McKim as Matt Winters
- Edmund Cobb as Tex
- Ethan Laidlaw as Tip
- Glenn Strange as Scanlon
- Jack Rockwell as Cole
- George Chesebro as Mac
- Sam Garrett as Joe
- John Rand as Jennings
- Edward Hearn as Murdock
- Steve Clark as Mac
- Jack Montgomery as Joe
