= South of Arizona =

1938 film by Sam Nelson

- Directed by: Sam Nelson
- Written by: Bennett Cohen
- Produced by: Harry L. Decker
- Starring: Charles Starrett; Iris Meredith; Bob Nolan
- Cinematography: Benjamin H. Kline
- Edited by: William A. Lyon
- Production company: Columbia Pictures
- Distributed by: Columbia Pictures
- Release date: July 28, 1938
- Running time: 56 minutes
- Country: United States
- Language: English

South of Arizona is a 1938 American Western film directed by Sam Nelson and starring Charles Starrett, Iris Meredith and Bob Nolan.

== Cast ==
- Charles Starrett as Clay Travers
- Iris Meredith as Ann Madison
- Bob Nolan as Bob - Travers Cowhand
- Dick Curtis as Ed Martin
- Robert Fiske as Mark Kenyon
- Edmund Cobb as Henchman Dorn
- Art Mix as Henchman Santos
- Dick Botiller as Henchman Latigo
- Lafe McKee as Lafe Brown
- Edward Coxen as Rancher Jed
- Hank Bell as Hank - Stagecoach Driver
- Sons of the Pioneers as Ranch Hands / Musicians

== Bibliography ==
- Pitts, Michael R. Western Movies: A Guide to 5,105 Feature Films. McFarland, 2012.
