= The Man from Tumbleweeds =

- Directed by: Joseph H. Lewis
- Screenplay by: Charles F. Royal
- Produced by: Leon Barsha
- Starring: Wild Bill Elliott; Iris Meredith; Dub Taylor; Ray Bennett; Francis Walker; Ernie Adams
- Cinematography: George Meehan
- Edited by: Charles Nelson
- Production company: Columbia Pictures
- Distributed by: Columbia Pictures
- Release date: May 2, 1940
- Running time: 59 minutes
- Country: United States
- Language: English

The Man from Tumbleweeds is a 1940 American Western film directed by Joseph H. Lewis and written by Charles F. Royal. The film stars Wild Bill Elliott, Iris Meredith, Dub Taylor, Ray Bennett, Francis Walker and Ernie Adams. The film was released on May 2, 1940, by Columbia Pictures. It is the third in Columbia Pictures' series of four "Wild Bill Saunders" films, followed by The Return of Wild Bill.

== Cast ==
- Wild Bill Elliott as Wild Bill Saunders
- Iris Meredith as 'Spunky' Cameron
- Dub Taylor as Cannonball
- Ray Bennett as Powder Kilgore
- Francis Walker as Lightning Barlow
- Ernie Adams as Shifty Sheldon
- Al Hill as Honest John Webster
- Stanley Brown as Ranger Dixon
- Richard Fiske as Henchman Slash
- Edward LeSaint as Jeff Cameron
- Don Beddoe as Governor Dawson
