= Spoilers of the Range =

1939 film by Charles C. Coleman

- Directed by: Charles C. Coleman (as C.C. Coleman Jr.)
- Screenplay by: Paul Franklin
- Produced by: Harry L. Decker
- Starring: Charles Starrett
- Cinematography: Allen G. Siegler
- Edited by: William A. Lyon
- Color process: Black and white
- Production company: Columbia Pictures
- Distributed by: Columbia Pictures
- Release date: April 27, 1939
- Running time: 57 minutes
- Country: United States
- Language: English

Spoilers of the Range is a 1939 American Western film directed by Charles C. Coleman and starring Charles Starrett.

== Plot ==
Hero Jeff Strong (Starrett) comes to the rescue of a group of victimized ranchers. The villains are a gang of crooked gamblers, who demand a valuable dam as payment for a $50,000 debt. The ranchers hope to earn the money by getting their cattle to market on time, but head bad guy Cash Fenton (Kenneth MacDonald) and his flunkey Lobo (Dick Curtis) intend to prevent this.

== Cast ==
- Charles Starrett as Jeff Strong
- Iris Meredith as Madge Patterson
- Sons of the Pioneers as Musicians
- Dick Curtis as Lobo Savage
- Kenneth MacDonald as Cash Fenton
- Hank Bell as Sheriff Hank
- Bob Nolan as Bob
- Edward LeSaint as Dan Patterson
- Forbes Murray as David Rowland
- Art Mix as Santos - Henchman
- Edmund Cobb as Kendall - Rancher
- Edward Peil Sr. as Harper - Rancher
