= Saddle Leather Law =

1944 film by Benjamin H. Kline

- Theatrical release poster
- Directed by: Benjamin H. Kline
- Screenplay by: Elizabeth Beecher
- Produced by: Jack Fier
- Starring: Charles Starrett; Dub Taylor; Vi Athens; Lloyd Bridges; Jimmy Wakely; Salty Holmes
- Cinematography: George Meehan
- Edited by: Aaron Stell
- Production company: Columbia Pictures
- Distributed by: Columbia Pictures
- Release date: December 21, 1944
- Running time: 55 minutes
- Country: United States
- Language: English

Saddle Leather Law is a 1944 American Western film directed by Benjamin H. Kline and written by Elizabeth Beecher. The film stars Charles Starrett, Dub Taylor, Vi Athens, Lloyd Bridges, Jimmy Wakely and Salty Holmes. The film was released on December 21, 1944, by Columbia Pictures.

== Cast ==
- Charles Starrett as Steve Carlisle
- Dub Taylor as Cannonball
- Vi Athens as Jane Fielding
- Lloyd Bridges as Paul Edwards
- Jimmy Wakely as Jimmy
- Salty Holmes as Salty
- Reed Howes as Reardon
- Robert Kortman as Choate
- Frank LaRue as Dr. Roberts
- Ted French as Quinn
- Ed Cassidy as Sheriff Tinsley
- Steve Clark as Deputy Sheriff Jones
- Budd Buster as Sheriff Burke
- Nolan Leary as Minister
- Joseph Eggenton as George Walker
- William Gould as Hiram Denton
- Netta Packer as Matilda
