= The Taming of the West (1939 film) =

1939 film directed by Norman Deming

- Directed by: Norman Deming
- Screenplay by: Charles F. Royal; Robert Lee Johnson
- Story by: Robert Lee Johnson
- Produced by: Leon Barsha
- Starring: Wild Bill Elliott; Iris Meredith
- Cinematography: George Meehan
- Edited by: Otto Meyer
- Production company: Astor Pictures
- Distributed by: Columbia Pictures
- Release date: December 7, 1939 (US)
- Running time: 55 minutes
- Country: United States
- Language: English

The Taming of the West, which had the working title of Sundown in Helldorado, is a 1939 American Western film directed by Norman Deming, starring Wild Bill Elliott, and Iris Meredith. This was the first of four "Wild Bill Saunders" films produced by Columbia Pictures, followed by Pioneers of the Frontier.

== Cast ==
- Wild Bill Elliott as Wild Bill Saunders
- Iris Meredith as Pepper
- Dick Curtis as Rawhide
- Dub Taylor as Cannonball
- James Craig as Handy
- Stanley Brown as Slim
- Ethan Allen as Judge Bailey
- Kenneth MacDonald as Carp Blaisdale
- Victor Wong as Cholly Wong
- Charles King as Jackson
- Lane Chandler as Turkey
- Art Mix as Blackie
- Richard Fiske as Blake
- John Tyrrell as Coleman
- Bob Woodward as Shifty
- Hank Bell as Marshall Bates

== Film series ==
Columbia Pictures produced four Wild Bill Saunders films:

1. The Taming of the West (Oct 1939)
2. Pioneers of the Frontier (Feb 1940)
3. The Man from Tumbleweeds (May 1940)
4. The Return of Wild Bill (June 1940)
