= Cowboy in the Clouds =

1943 film by Benjamin H. Kline

- Theatrical release poster
- Directed by: Benjamin H. Kline
- Screenplay by: Elizabeth Beecher
- Story by: Elizabeth Beecher
- Produced by: Jack Fier
- Starring: Charles Starrett; Dub Taylor; Julie Duncan; Jimmy Wakely; Davison Clark; Wally Wales
- Cinematography: George Meehan
- Edited by: Aaron Stell
- Production company: Columbia Pictures
- Distributed by: Columbia Pictures
- Release date: December 23, 1943
- Running time: 54 minutes
- Country: United States
- Language: English

Cowboy in the Clouds is a 1943 American Western film directed by Benjamin H. Kline and written by Elizabeth Beecher. The film stars Charles Starrett, Dub Taylor, Julie Duncan, Jimmy Wakely, Davison Clark and Wally Wales. The film was released on December 23, 1943, by Columbia Pictures.

== Cast ==
- Charles Starrett as Steve Kendall
- Dub Taylor as Cannonball
- Julie Duncan as Dorrie Bishop
- Jimmy Wakely as Glen Avery
- Davison Clark as Amos Fowler
- Wally Wales as Haldey
- Dick Curtis as Roy Madison
- Ed Cassidy as Sheriff Page
- Paul Conrad as Dean
- Charles King as Thripp
- John Tyrrell as Mack Judd
- Foy Willing as Foy
- Shelby Atchinson as Shelby
- Dwight Latham as Dwight
- Guy Bonham as Guy
- Walter Carlson as Walter
