= The Man from Sundown =

1939 film by Sam Nelson

- Theatrical release poster
- Directed by: Sam Nelson
- Screenplay by: Paul Franklin
- Produced by: Harry L. Decker
- Starring: Charles Starrett; Iris Meredith; Richard Fiske; Jack Rockwell; Alan Bridge; Dick Botiller
- Cinematography: Benjamin H. Kline
- Edited by: William Lyon
- Production company: Columbia Pictures
- Distributed by: Columbia Pictures
- Release date: July 15, 1939
- Running time: 58 minutes
- Country: United States
- Language: English

The Man from Sundown is a 1939 American Western film directed by Sam Nelson and written by Paul Franklin. The film stars Charles Starrett, Iris Meredith, Richard Fiske, Jack Rockwell, Alan Bridge and Dick Botiller. The film was released on July 15, 1939, by Columbia Pictures.

== Plot ==
Rancher Tom Kellogg gets killed right before testifying against a gang of outlaws, then Ranger Larry Whalen comes in and finds the location of the gang's hideout and along with Tom's sister Barbara leads some angry ranchers into the gang.

== Cast ==
- Charles Starrett as Larry Whalen
- Iris Meredith as Barbara Kellogg
- Richard Fiske as Tom Kellogg
- Jack Rockwell as Hank Austin
- Alan Bridge as Slick Larson
- Dick Botiller as Rio Mason
- Ernie Adams as Shorty Bates
- Bob Nolan as Bob
- Pat Brady as Pat
- Robert Fiske as Captain Prescott
- Edward Peil Sr. as Sheriff Wiley
- Clem Horton as Bat
- Forrest Dillon as Kirk
- Edmund Cobb as Roper
- Tim Spencer as Tim
- Hugh Farr as Hugh
- Karl Farr as Guitar Player
- Lloyd Perryman as Lloyd
