= The Son of Davy Crockett =

1941 film by Lambert Hillyer

- Directed by: Lambert Hillyer
- Written by: Lambert Hillyer
- Produced by: Leon Barsha
- Starring: Wild Bill Elliott; Iris Meredith; Dub Taylor; Kenneth MacDonald; Richard Fiske; Eddy Waller
- Cinematography: Benjamin H. Kline
- Edited by: Mel Thorsen
- Production company: Columbia Pictures
- Distributed by: Columbia Pictures
- Release date: July 15, 1941
- Running time: 59 minutes
- Country: United States
- Language: English

The Son of Davy Crockett is a 1941 American Western film written and directed by Lambert Hillyer. The film stars Wild Bill Elliott, Iris Meredith, Dub Taylor, Kenneth MacDonald, Richard Fiske and Eddy Waller. The film was released on July 15, 1941, by Columbia Pictures.

== Cast ==
- Wild Bill Elliott as Dave Crockett
- Iris Meredith as Doris Mathews
- Dub Taylor as Cannonball
- Kenneth MacDonald as King Canfield
- Richard Fiske as Jesse Gordon
- Eddy Waller as Grandpa Mathews
- Donald Curtis as Jack Ringe
- Paul Scardon as Zeke
- Edmund Cobb as Lance
- Steve Clark as Curly
- Harrison Greene as President Ulysses S. Grant
- Lloyd Bridges as Sammy
- Stanley Brown as Clint
- Eddie Laughton as Burns
- Martin Garralaga as Lopez
- Francis Sayles as Doc Banks
- Ray Jones as Henchman
