= Texas Stagecoach =

1940 film by Josepg H. Lewis

- Theatrical release poster
- Directed by: Joseph H. Lewis
- Screenplay by: Fred Myton
- Produced by: Leon Barsha
- Starring: Charles Starrett; Iris Meredith; Bob Nolan; Dick Curtis; Kenneth MacDonald; Pat Brady
- Cinematography: George Meehan
- Edited by: Charles Nelson
- Production company: Columbia Pictures
- Distributed by: Columbia Pictures
- Release date: May 23, 1940
- Running time: 60 minutes
- Country: United States
- Language: English

Texas Stagecoach is a 1940 American Western film directed by Joseph H. Lewis and written by Fred Myton. The film stars Charles Starrett, Iris Meredith, Bob Nolan, Dick Curtis, Kenneth MacDonald and Pat Brady. The film was released on May 23, 1940, by Columbia Pictures.

== Cast ==
- Charles Starrett as Larry Kinkaid
- Iris Meredith as Jean Harper
- Bob Nolan as Bob Harper
- Dick Curtis as Shoshone Larsen
- Kenneth MacDonald as John Appleby
- Pat Brady as Pat
- Edward LeSaint as Jim Kinkaid
- George Becinita as Opache
- Don Beddoe as Tug Wilson
- Harry Cording as Clancy
