= Outlaws of the Panhandle =

1941 film by Sam Nelson

- Theatrical release poster
- Directed by: Sam Nelson
- Screenplay by: Paul Franklin
- Produced by: Jack Fier
- Starring: Charles Starrett; Frances Robinson; Stanley Brown; Norman Willis; Ray Teal; Lee Prather
- Cinematography: George Meehan
- Edited by: Art Seid
- Production company: Columbia Pictures
- Distributed by: Columbia Pictures
- Release date: February 27, 1941
- Running time: 59 minutes
- Country: United States
- Language: English

Outlaws of the Panhandle is a 1941 American Western film directed by Sam Nelson and written by Paul Franklin. The film stars Charles Starrett, Frances Robinson, Stanley Brown, Norman Willis, Ray Teal and Lee Prather. The film was released on February 27, 1941, by Columbia Pictures.

== Cast ==
- Charles Starrett as Jim Endicott
- Frances Robinson as Doris Burnett
- Stanley Brown as Neil Vaughn
- Norman Willis as 'Faro Jack' Vaughn
- Ray Teal as Walt Burnett
- Lee Prather as Elihu Potter
- Bob Nolan as Bob
- Steve Clark as Lon Hewitt
- Bud Osborne as Mart Monahan
- Eddie Laughton as Chad
- Richard Fiske as Britt
- Jack Low as Dogger
