= Bullets for Rustlers =

1940 film by Sam Nelson

- Theatrical release poster
- Directed by: Sam Nelson
- Screenplay by: John Rathmell
- Produced by: Harry L. Decker
- Starring: Charles Starrett; Lorna Gray; Bob Nolan; Dick Curtis; Kenneth MacDonald; Jack Rockwell
- Cinematography: George Meehan
- Edited by: Charles Nelson
- Production company: Columbia Pictures
- Distributed by: Columbia Pictures
- Release date: March 5, 1940
- Running time: 58 minutes
- Country: United States
- Language: English

Bullets for Rustlers is a 1940 American Western film directed by Sam Nelson and written by John Rathmell. The film stars Charles Starrett, Lorna Gray, Bob Nolan, Dick Curtis, Kenneth MacDonald and Jack Rockwell. The film was released on March 5, 1940, by Columbia Pictures.

== Cast ==
- Charles Starrett as Steve Beaumont
- Lorna Gray as Ann Houston
- Bob Nolan as Bob
- Dick Curtis as Strang
- Kenneth MacDonald as Ed Brock
- Jack Rockwell as Sheriff Webb
- Edward LeSaint as Judge Baxter
- Francis Walker as Ellis
- Eddie Laughton as Shorty
- Lee Prather as Tom Andrews
- Wally Wales as Eb Smith
