= Thundering Frontier =

1940 film

- Directed by: D. Ross Lederman
- Screenplay by: Paul Franklin
- Starring: Charles Starrett
- Cinematography: George Meehan
- Edited by: Arthur Seid
- Music by: Bob Nolan; Tim Spencer
- Production company: Columbia Pictures
- Distributed by: Columbia Pictures
- Release date: December 5, 1940
- Running time: 57 minutes
- Country: United States
- Language: English

Thundering Frontier is a 1940 American Western film directed by D. Ross Lederman and starring Charles Starrett.

== Cast ==
- Charles Starrett as Jim Filmore
- Iris Meredith as Norma Belknap
- Ray Bennett as Ed Filmore (as Raphael Bennett)
- Alex Callam as Square Deal Scottie
- Carl Stockdale as Andrew Belknap
- Fred Burns as Hank Loomis
- Bob Nolan as Bob
- John Tyrrell as Bartender Mac
- Francis Walker as Henchman Stub
- John Dilson as Carter Filmore
