= West of Abilene =

1940 film by Ralph Ceder

- Theatrical release poster
- Directed by: Ralph Ceder
- Screenplay by: Paul Franklin
- Produced by: Leon Barsha
- Starring: Charles Starrett; Marjorie Cooley; Bruce Bennett; William Pawley; Don Beddoe; George Cleveland
- Cinematography: George Meehan
- Edited by: Charles Nelson
- Production company: Columbia Pictures
- Distributed by: Columbia Pictures
- Release date: October 21, 1940
- Running time: 58 minutes
- Country: United States
- Language: English

West of Abilene is a 1940 American Western film directed by Ralph Ceder and written by Paul Franklin. The film stars Charles Starrett, Marjorie Cooley, Bruce Bennett, William Pawley, Don Beddoe and George Cleveland. The film was released on October 21, 1940, by Columbia Pictures.

== Cast ==
- Charles Starrett as Tom Garfield
- Marjorie Cooley as Judith Burnside
- Bruce Bennett as Frank Garfield
- William Pawley as Chris Matson
- Don Beddoe as Forsyth
- George Cleveland as Bill Burnside
- Forrest Taylor as Sheriff
- William Kellogg as Deputy
- Bob Nolan as Bob
- Francis Walker as Bat
- Eddie Laughton as Poke
- Vester Pegg as Kennedy
- Bud Osborne as Wilson
