= Two-Fisted Rangers =

1939 film by Joseph H. Lewis

- Theatrical release poster
- Directed by: Joseph H. Lewis
- Screenplay by: Fred Myton
- Produced by: Leon Barsha
- Starring: Charles Starrett
- Cinematography: George Meehan
- Edited by: Charles Nelson
- Production company: Columbia Pictures
- Distributed by: Columbia Pictures
- Release date: December 13, 1939
- Running time: 62 minutes
- Country: United States
- Language: English

Two-Fisted Rangers is a 1939 American Western film directed by Joseph H. Lewis and written by Fred Myton. The film stars Charles Starrett, Iris Meredith, Bob Nolan, Kenneth MacDonald, Dick Curtis and Wally Wales. The film was released on December 13, 1939, by Columbia Pictures.

== Plot ==
Thad Lawson arrives in Oak Valley driven by a quest for justice after his brother, the town's sheriff, is murdered. He discovers that Jack Rand, a formidable figure in Oak Valley, is responsible for the crime. When Rand further escalates his reign of terror by killing Jordan Webster, the local newspaper publisher, Thad resolves to bring him to justice. With allies like Dirk Hogan and the newly appointed sheriff Jim Hanley, Thad strategizes to dismantle Rand's criminal empire once and for all.

== Cast ==
- Charles Starrett as Thad Lawson
- Iris Meredith as Betty Webster
- Bob Nolan as Bob
- Kenneth MacDonald as Jack Rand
- Dick Curtis as Dirk Hogan
- Wally Wales as Sheriff Jim Hanley
- Bill Cody Jr. as Sliver
- Pat Brady as Pat
- Hugh Farr as Hugh
- Karl Farr as Karl
- Lloyd Perryman as Lloyd
- Tim Spencer as Tim
