= Dick Curtis =

American actor (1902–1952)

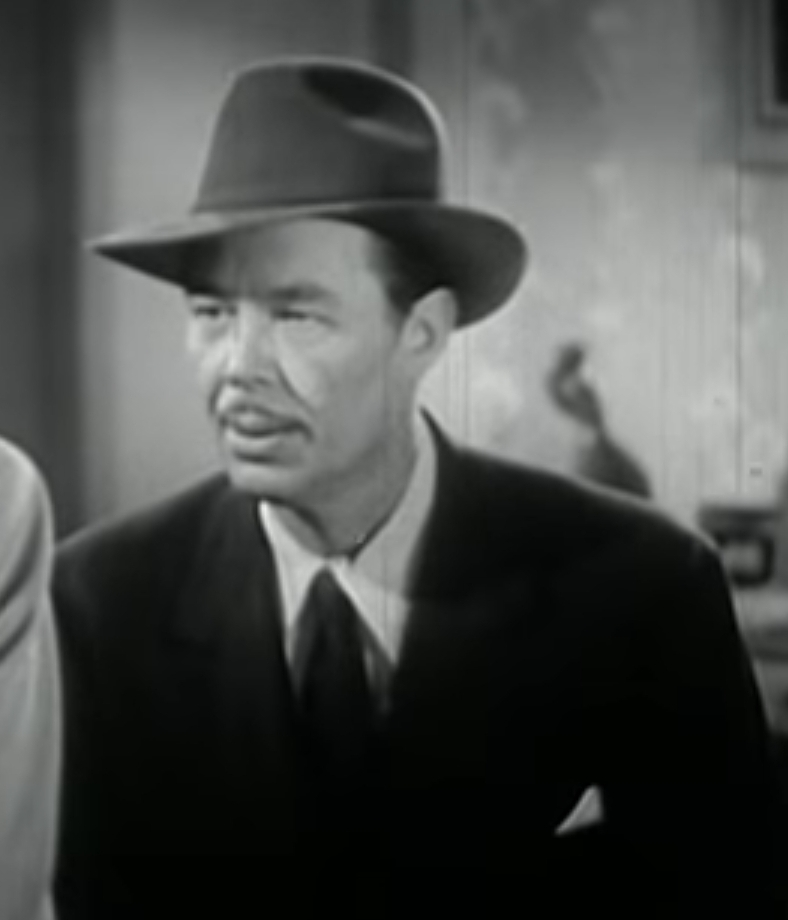
- Curtis in Lady in the Death House (1944)
- Born: Richard Dye; May 11, 1902; Newport, Kentucky, U.S.
- Died: January 3, 1952 (aged 49); Los Angeles, California, U.S.
- Resting place: Holy Cross Cemetery, Culver City, California
- Years active: 1919–1952
- Spouse: Ruth Sullivan (m. 1925)
- Children: John (1929-2004); Phyllis (1936-1961)

Dick Curtis (born Richard Dye, May 11, 1902 – January 3, 1952), was an American actor who made over 230 film and television appearances during his career.

== Early years ==
Curtis was born in Newport, Kentucky, the son of Frank Dye and Elizabeth Faulkner Dye.

== Career ==
After having limited work in Hollywood, Curtis acted on stage in New York and toured in a variety of productions from 1926 to 1930. He signed with the RKO studio, where he played incidental roles through 1935. His most familiar RKO credits are King Kong (in which Curtis is visible as a crew member aboard ship) and the Wheeler and Woolsey comedy The Nitwits (as a policeman).

After RKO released him, Curtis found work with low-budget, independent companies. Cowboy superstar Tom Mix made his only serial in 1935, The Miracle Rider, and Curtis was one of many character players in the supporting cast. This established the 6-foot, 3-inch actor in movie westerns.

== Columbia Pictures ==
In 1937 Curtis was hired by Columbia Pictures to play villains in its popular Charles Starrett westerns. Starrett and Curtis worked together so often, in so many features, that Starrett referred to their string of films as "the never-ending fight." Indeed, authors Richard Griffith and Arthur Mayer, in their 1957 book The Movies, paid tribute to Starrett and Curtis in a photo essay called "The Never-Ending Fight." Curtis usually wore a pencil mustache in westerns, and retained the makeup for other character roles.

Members of Columbia's stock company of actors were called upon to play in any kind of movie. Thus, in addition to his many Columbia westerns, Dick Curtis can be seen in Columbia's major feature films (You Can't Take It with You), inexpensive "B" features (Blondie, The Man They Could Not Hang), serials (The Spider's Web, Batman), and two-reel comedies (with The Three Stooges, Charley Chase, Andy Clyde, Smith and Dale, and Hugh Herbert).

Curtis almost always played villains -- straight or comic -- but he did have occasional character parts. Perhaps his most benign role was in the 1943 serial The Phantom, where he played a sympathetic jungle chieftain.

== Pioneertown ==
With the help of his friend and actor Russell Hayden, Curtis helped develop Pioneertown, a western movie-set location in Southern California that was used for many television and film westerns. The project was done in partnership with Roy Rogers and the Sons of the Pioneers.

== Television ==
Curtis, being a regular in westerns, was an early arrival in television production. He made appearances on The Lone Ranger, The Range Rider, The Gene Autry Show, and many others. He might have gone farther in the new field but his video career was short, owing to declining health.

== Final works ==
Curtis remained active in theatrical motion pictures into the early 1950s. By this time he abandoned his graying mustache for a clean-shaven look (as in the 1951 serial Government Agents vs. Phantom Legion).

== Personal life ==
Curtis was married to silent-film actress Ruth Sullivan, who survived him.

== Death ==
Dick Curtis died at age 49 of pneumonia, brought on by lung cancer, on January 3, 1952. He is buried at Holy Cross Cemetery in Culver City, California.

== Selected filmography ==
- Tell It to the Marines (1926) - Marine in Barracks (uncredited)
- Shooting Straight (1930) - Butch
- Up the River (1930) - New Inmate (uncredited)
- The Silver Horde (1930) - Fight Spectator (uncredited)
- Secret Service(1931) - Prisoner Buying Goobers (uncredited)
- Hell's House (1932) - Cop on the Beat (uncredited)
- Girl Crazy (1932) - Cowboy Giving Directions (uncredited)
- The Famous Ferguson Case (1932) - O'Toole (uncredited)
- King Kong (1933) - Member of Ship's Crew (uncredited)
- King Kelly of the U.S.A. (1934) - Otto - Palace Guard (uncredited)
- A Successful Failure (1934) - Man in Rally Crowd (uncredited)
- The Silver Streak (1934) - Boulder Dam Foreman (uncredited)
- Romance in Manhattan (1935) - Man at East River (uncredited)
- Clive of India (1935) - Hoodlum on Dock (uncredited)
- Northern Frontier (1935) - Pete - Henchman (uncredited)
- Mutiny Ahead (1935) - Stevens
- Wilderness Mail (1935) - Jacques - Henchman
- The Miracle Rider (1935, Serial) - Copelee (uncredited)
- The Nitwits (1935) - Cop on Stakeout (uncredited)
- Code of the Mounted (1935) - Snakey - Henchman
- The Arizonian (1935) - Henchman (uncredited)
- Trails of the Wild (1935) - Henchman Roper
- Western Frontier (1935) - Pioneer Settler (uncredited)
- Condemned to Live (1935) - Villager at Pit Rim (uncredited)
- Skybound (1935) - Master of Ceremonies (uncredited)
- Western Courage (1935) - Henchman Bat (uncredited)
- Racing Luck (1935) - 'Dynamite'
- Just My Luck (1935) - Henchman (uncredited)
- Federal Agent (1936) - Curbside Cabbie (uncredited)
- Crashing Through Danger (1936) - Foreman
- Burning Gold (1936) - Swede
- Go-Get-'Em, Haines (1936) - Mike - Cab Driver (uncredited)
- Wildcat Trooper (1936) - Henri (uncredited)
- The Lion's Den (1936) - Slim Burtis - Henchman
- The Crooked Trail (1936) - Kirk - Miner (uncredited)
- Ghost Patrol (1936) - Henchman Charlie
- The Traitor (1936) - Henchman Morgan
- Phantom Patrol (1936) - Henchman Josef
- Daniel Boone (1936) - Vince - Frontiersman (uncredited)
- Wild Horse Round-Up (1936) - Bill
- Valley of Terror (1937) - Buck - Henchman
- The Singing Buckaroo (1937) - Odie - Henchman
- Blake of Scotland Yard (1937) - Nicky - Henchman
- The Gambling Terror (1937) - Henchman Dick
- Headline Crasher (1937) - Joe (uncredited)
- Trail of Vengeance (1937) - Cartwright - Henchman
- Motor Madness (1937) - Sailor (uncredited)
- Two Gun Law (1937) - Len Edwards
- Bar-Z Bad Men (1937) - Henchman Brent
- The Frame-Up (1937) - Slim (uncredited)
- Guns in the Dark (1937) - Brace Stevens
- A Lawman Is Born (1937) - Lefty Drogan
- One Man Justice (1937) - Henchman Hank Skinner
- Boothill Brigade (1937) - Bull Berke
- The Game That Kills (1937) - Whitey
- Moonlight on the Range (1937) - Hank - Henchman
- Life Begins with Love (1937) - Radical (uncredited)
- Counsel for Crime (1937) - Hood (uncredited)
- Murder in Greenwich Village (1937) - Campbell Security Guard (uncredited)
- The Old Wyoming Trail (1937) - Ed Slade
- Outlaws of the Prairie (1937) - Dragg
- Paid to Dance (1937) - Mike Givens
- The Shadow (1937) - Carlos
- Little Miss Roughneck (1938) - (uncredited)
- Penitentiary (1938) - Tex (uncredited)
- Cattle Raiders (1938) - Ed Munro
- Who Killed Gail Preston? (1938) - Henchman Mike
- Women in Prison (1938) - Mac
- Rawhide (1938) - Butch - Saunders Henchman
- Call of the Rockies (1938) - Matt Stark
- Law of the Plains (1938) - Jim Fletcher
- The Lone Wolf in Paris (1938) - Palace Vault Guard (uncredited)
- Reformatory (1938) - Guard (uncredited)
- The Main Event (1938) - Sawyer
- Squadron of Honor (1938) - Craig
- West of Cheyenne (1938) - Link Murdock
- City Streets (1938) - Madden - County Welfare Officer (uncredited)
- South of Arizona (1938) - Ed Martin
- You Can't Take It with You (1938) - Strongarm Man (uncredited)
- The Colorado Trail (1938) - Henchman Slash Driscoll
- Juvenile Court (1938) - Detective Capturing Dutch Adams (uncredited)
- West of the Santa Fe (1938) - Matt Taylor
- The Spider's Web (1938, Serial) - Malloy (uncredited)
- The Lady Objects (1938) - Jail Guard (uncredited)
- Adventure in Sahara (1938) - Karnoldi
- Blondie (1938) - Daily Gazette Reporter (uncredited)
- Rio Grande (1938) - Ed Barker
- Flat Foot Stooges (1938, Short) - Mr. Reardon
- The Little Adventuress (1938) - Race Starter (uncredited)
- Smashing the Spy Ring (1938) - Williams (uncredited)
- Homicide Bureau (1939) - Radio Broadcaster (voice, uncredited)
- The Thundering West (1939) - Wolf Munro
- North of Shanghai (1939) - Creighton
- The Lone Wolf Spy Hunt (1939) - Heavy (uncredited)
- Flying G-Men (1939, Serial) - Henchman Korman
- My Son Is a Criminal (1939) - Gangster (uncredited)
- We Want Our Mummy (1939, Short) - Jackson (uncredited)
- Let Us Live (1939) - Convict on Death Row (uncredited)
- Romance of the Redwoods (1939) - Gas Station Attendant (uncredited)
- Blind Alley (1939) - Trooper with Joe (uncredited)
- Spoilers of the Range (1939) - Lobo Savage
- Outside These Walls (1939) - Flint
- Mandrake the Magician (1939, Serial) - Dorgan - Henchman (Chs. 6–8)
- Yes, We Have No Bonanza (1939, Short) - Maxey
- Missing Daughters (1939) - Henchman (uncredited)
- Western Caravans (1939) - Mort Kohler
- Overland with Kit Carson (1939, Serial) - Drake - Henchman
- Behind Prison Gates (1939) - Capt. Simmons
- The Man They Could Not Hang (1939) - Jury Foreman Clifford Kearney
- Riders of Black River (1939) - Blaize Carewe
- Outpost of the Mounties (1939) - Wade Beaumont
- Those High Grey Walls (1939) - Convict (uncredited)
- Oily to Bed, Oily to Rise (1939, Short) - Clipper - Swindler in Back Seat (uncredited)
- The Taming of the West (1939) - Rawhide
- Scandal Sheet (1939) - Guard
- The Amazing Mr. Williams (1939) - Joe (uncredited)
- The Stranger from Texas (1939) - Bat Stringer
- Two-Fisted Rangers (1939) - Henchman Dirk Hogan
- My Son Is Guilty (1939) - Monk
- You Nazty Spy! (1940, Short) - Mr. Ohnay (uncredited)
- Pioneers of the Frontier (1940) - Matt Brawley
- Blondie on a Budget (1940) - Tony - Mechanic (uncredited)
- Bullets for Rustlers (1940) - Strang
- Rockin' Thru the Rockies (1940, Short) - Indian Chief (uncredited)
- Blazing Six Shooters (1940) - Lash Bender
- Terry and the Pirates (1940, Serial) - Master Fang
- Men Without Souls (1940) - Duke
- Texas Stagecoach (1940) - Shoshone Larsen
- Boom Town (1940) - Hiring Boss (uncredited)
- Wyoming (1940) - Corky - Henchman (uncredited)
- Ragtime Cowboy Joe (1940) - Bo Gilman
- Three Men from Texas (1940) - Gardner - Henchman
- The Son of Monte Cristo (1940) - Guard (uncredited)
- So Ends Our Night (1941) - Gestapo Stormtrooper (uncredited)
- Across the Sierras (1941) - Mitch Carew
- The Round Up (1941) - Ed Crandall
- Billy the Kid (1941) - Kirby Claxton
- I Was a Prisoner on Devil's Island (1941) - Jules
- Mystery Ship (1941) - Van Brock
- Stick to Your Guns (1941) - Nevada Teale
- Honky Tonk (1941) - Tough Man on Train (uncredited)
- Sea Raiders (1941, Serial) - Mate on the 'Astoria' [Chs. 4-5] (uncredited)
- Arizona Cyclone (1941) - Quirt Crenshaw
- Ellery Queen and the Murder Ring (1941) - Policeman (uncredited)
- Shut My Big Mouth (1942) - Henchman (uncredited)
- Two Yanks in Trinidad (1942) - Sea Captain
- Men of San Quentin (1942) - Butch Mason
- Tombstone, the Town Too Tough to Die (1942) - Frank McLowery
- Jackass Mail (1942) - Jim Swade
- Vengeance of the West (1942) - Jeff Gorman
- City of Silent Men (1942) - Frank Muller
- Pardon My Gun (1942) - Clint Hayes (uncredited)
- You Can't Beat the Law (1943) - Prison Guard (uncredited)
- Riders of the Northwest Mounted (1943) - Victor Renaud (uncredited)
- Batman (1943, Serial) - Agent Croft of Section 50 [Ch. 10-12] (uncredited)
- Higher Than a Kite (1943, Short) - Gen. Bommel (uncredited)
- Salute to the Marines (1943) - Cpl. Mosley
- The Cross of Lorraine (1943) - Nazi Guard in Village (uncredited)
- Jack London (1943) - Cannery Foreman (uncredited)
- Cowboy in the Clouds (1943) - Roy Madison
- The Phantom (1943, Serial) - Tartar Chieftain (uncredited)
- Crash Goes the Hash (1944, Short) - Prince Shaam of Ubeedarn
- Lady in the Death House (1944) - Willis Millen
- Hey, Rookie (1944) - Sergeant (uncredited)
- Gambler's Choice (1944) - Mr. Hadley (uncredited)
- The Black Parachute (1944) - German Lieutenant (uncredited)
- Spook Town (1944) - Sam Benson
- Waterfront (1944) - Drunken Sailor (uncredited)
- Mystery of the River Boat (1944, Serial) - Craig Cassard
- High Powered (1945) - Worker (uncredited)
- The Master Key (1945, Serial) - Reicher (uncredited)
- The Great John L. (1945) - Waldo (uncredited)
- Blonde from Brooklyn (1945) - Soldier (uncredited)
- Scared Stiff (1945) - Bus Driver (uncredited)
- Wagon Wheels Westward (1945) - Henchman Tuttle
- Scarlet Street (1945) - Detective (uncredited)
- The Bandit of Sherwood Forest (1946) - Castle Gate Guard (uncredited)
- Abilene Town (1946) - 'Cap' Ryker
- The Scarlet Horseman (1946, Serial) - Jed (Ch 2) (uncredited)
- California Gold Rush (1946) - Chopin - the Harmonica Killer
- Song of Arizona (1946) - Henchman Bart
- Lost City of the Jungle (1946) - Johnson
- The Three Troubledoers (1946, Short) - Badlands Blackie
- Traffic in Crime (1946) - Jake Schultz
- Wild Beauty (1946) - John Andrews
- Lawless Breed (1946) - Bartley Mellon and Captain Isaac Mellon
- Santa Fe Uprising (1946) - Henchman Luke Case
- Renegade Girl (1946) - Joe Barnes
- Wyoming (1947) - Ed Lassiter
- Navajo Trail Raiders (1949) - Henchman Brad
- The Outriders (1950) - Outrider at Dance (uncredited)
- Cargo to Capetown (1950) - Charlie - Sailor in Bar (uncredited)
- Wabash Avenue (1950) - Jim - Poker Player (uncredited)
- The Vanishing Westerner (1950) - Bartender
- Rock Island Trail (1950) - Barton - Railroad Agitator (uncredited)
- The Gunfighter (1950) - Townsman at Funeral (uncredited)
- Covered Wagon Raid (1950) - Henchman Grif
- The Sun Sets at Dawn (1950) - Guard (uncredited)
- The Jackpot (1950) - Moving Man (uncredited)
- Three Arabian Nuts (1951, Short) - Hassan
- Inside Straight (1951) - Marshal (uncredited)
- Rawhide (1951) - Hawley (uncredited)
- Whirlwind (1951) - Lon Kramer
- Don't Throw That Knife (1951, Short) - Mr. Wycoff
- Roar of the Iron Horse - Rail-Blazer of the Apache Trail (1951) - Campo - The Baron's Chief Gunman
- Lorna Doone (1951) - Garth (uncredited)
- The Texas Rangers (1951) - Prison Guard (uncredited)
- Government Agents vs. Phantom Legion (1951) - Regan
- The Red Badge of Courage (1951) - Veteran (uncredited)
- The Tooth Will Out (1951, Short) - Shemp's Last Patient (uncredited)
- Chicago Calling (1951) - Road Gang Foreman (uncredited)
- Rose of Cimarron (1952) - Clem Dawley
- My Six Convicts (1952) - Guard (uncredited)
- Bronco Buster (1952) - Bartender (uncredited) (final film role)
