= The Colorado Trail (film) =

1938 film

- Directed by: Sam Nelson
- Written by: Charles F. Royal
- Produced by: Harry L. Decker
- Starring: Charles Starrett; Iris Meredith; Bob Nolan
- Cinematography: Benjamin H. Kline
- Edited by: William A. Lyon
- Music by: Morris Stoloff
- Production company: Columbia Pictures
- Distributed by: Columbia Pictures
- Release date: September 8, 1938
- Running time: 55 minutes
- Country: United States
- Language: English

The Colorado Trail is a 1938 American western film directed by Sam Nelson, starring Charles Starrett, Iris Meredith and Bob Nolan.

== Cast ==
- Charles Starrett as Grant Bradley
- Iris Meredith as Joan Randall
- Bob Nolan as Bob Nolan
- Edward LeSaint as Jeff Randall
- Al Bridge as Mark Sheldon
- Robert Fiske as Deacon Webster
- Dick Curtis as Henchman Slash Driscoll
- Hank Bell as Tombstone Terry
- Edward Peil Sr. as Hobbs
- Edmund Cobb as Cameron
- Jack Rube Clifford as Judge Bennett
- George Chesebro as Hadely
- Sons of the Pioneers as Musicians

== Bibliography ==
- Pitts, Michael R. Western Movies: A Guide to 5,105 Feature Films. McFarland, 2012.
