= The Thundering West =

1939 film by Sam Nelson

- Theatrical release poster
- Directed by: Sam Nelson
- Written by: Bennett R. Cohen
- Produced by: Harry L. Decker
- Starring: Charles Starrett; Iris Meredith
- Cinematography: Lucien Ballard
- Edited by: William Lyon
- Music by: M. W. Stoloff
- Production company: Columbia Pictures
- Distributed by: Columbia Pictures
- Release date: January 12, 1939 (US)
- Running time: 56 minutes
- Country: United States
- Language: English

The Thundering West, also known as Trail of the Tumbleweed, is a 1939 American Western film directed by Sam Nelson, starring Charles Starrett, and Iris Meredith.

== Cast ==
- Charles Starrett as Jim Dale
- Iris Meredith as Helen Patterson
- Dick Curtis as Wolf Munro
- Hank Bell as Tucson
- Edward J. Le Saint as Judge Patterson
- Hal Taliaferro as Frank Kendall
- Bob Nolan as Bob
- Sons of the Pioneers
- Robert Fiske as Harper
- Edmund Cobb as Dagger
- Art Mix as Kirk
