= William Lyon (film editor) =

American film editor

- Born: January 21, 1903; Texas, United States
- Died: March 18, 1974 (aged 71); Los Angeles, California, United States
- Occupation: Film editor

William Austin Lyon (January 21, 1903 – March 18, 1974) was an American film editor, from 1934 to 1971. He was born in Texas, and died in Los Angeles. Employed by Columbia Pictures for most of his career, he was nominated for the Academy Award for Best Film Editing six times, and won twice, for From Here to Eternity (1953) and Picnic (1955).

== Selected filmography ==
William Lyon began his career as an editor. Based on Lyon's filmography at the Internet Movie Database.

Editor
Year	Film	Director	Notes	Other notes	Ref.
1936	Alibi for Murder	D. Ross Lederman	First collaboration with D. Ross Lederman		
1936	Code of the Range	Charles C. Coleman	First collaboration with Charles C. Coleman		
1936	The Cowboy Star	David Selman	First collaboration with David Selman		
1937	Find the Witness	David Selman	Second collaboration with David Selman		
1937	Trapped	Leon Barsha	First collaboration with Leon Barsha		
1937	Two Gun Law	Leon Barsha	Second collaboration with Leon Barsha		
1937	Two-Fisted Sheriff	Leon Barsha	Third collaboration with Leon Barsha		
1937	One Man Justice	Leon Barsha	Fourth collaboration with Leon Barsha		
1937	The Old Wyoming Trail	Folmar Blangsted			
1937	I'll Take Romance	Edward H. Griffith			
1937	Outlaws of the Prairie	Sam Nelson	First collaboration with Sam Nelson		
1938	Call of the Rockies	Alan James			
1938	West of Cheyenne	Sam Nelson	Second collaboration with Sam Nelson		
1938	South of Arizona	Sam Nelson	Third collaboration with Sam Nelson		
1938	The Colorado Trail	Sam Nelson	Fourth collaboration with Sam Nelson		
1938	West of the Santa Fe	Sam Nelson	Fifth collaboration with Sam Nelson		
1938	Rio Grande	Sam Nelson	Sixth collaboration with Sam Nelson		
1939	The Thundering West	Sam Nelson	Seventh collaboration with Sam Nelson		
1939	Texas Stampede	Sam Nelson	Eighth collaboration with Sam Nelson		
1939	North of the Yukon	Sam Nelson	Ninth collaboration with Sam Nelson		
1939	Spoilers of the Range	Charles C. Coleman	Second collaboration with Charles C. Coleman		
1939	Western Caravans	Sam Nelson	Tenth collaboration with Sam Nelson		
1939	The Man from Sundown	Sam Nelson	Eleventh collaboration with Sam Nelson		
1939	The Man They Could Not Hang	Nick Grinde	First collaboration with Nick Grinde		
1939	Riders of Black River	Norman Deming			
1939	Scandal Sheet	Nick Grinde	Second collaboration with Nick Grinde		
1939	My Son Is Guilty	Charles Barton	First collaboration with Charles Barton		
1940	Too Many Husbands	Wesley Ruggles	First collaboration with Wesley Ruggles		
1940	Arizona	Wesley Ruggles	Second collaboration with Wesley Ruggles		
1940	The Phantom Submarine	Charles Barton	Second collaboration with Charles Barton		
1941	Naval Academy	Erle C. Kenton			
1941	Sweetheart of the Campus	Edward Dmytryk	First collaboration with Edward Dmytryk		
1941	Texas	George Marshall			
1941	Harvard, Here I Come	Lew Landers	First collaboration with Lew Landers		
1942	Lawless Plainsmen	William Berke			
1942	Tramp, Tramp, Tramp	Charles Barton	Third collaboration with Charles Barton		
1942	Submarine Raider	Lew Landers	Second collaboration with Lew Landers		
1942	Sabotage Squad	Lew Landers	Third collaboration with Lew Landers		
1942	You Were Never Lovelier	William A. Seiter			
1946	The Jolson Story	Alfred E. Green			
1947	The Lone Wolf in Mexico	D. Ross Lederman	Second collaboration with D. Ross Lederman		
1947	Mr. District Attorney	Robert B. Sinclair			
1947	The Guilt of Janet Ames	Henry Levin	First collaboration with Henry Levin	Uncredited	
1948	To the Ends of the Earth	Robert Stevenson			
1949	The Walking Hills	John Sturges			
1949	Jolson Sings Again	Henry Levin	Second collaboration with Henry Levin		
1950	Cargo to Capetown	Earl McEvoy			
1950	No Sad Songs for Me	Rudolph Maté			
1950	The Fuller Brush Girl	Lloyd Bacon			
1951	Saturday's Hero	David Miller	First collaboration with David Miller		
1951	Ten Tall Men	Willis Goldbeck			
1951	Death of a Salesman	László Benedek			
1952	Thief of Damascus	Will Jason			
1952	The Happy Time	Richard Fleischer			
1952	The Member of the Wedding	Fred Zinnemann	First collaboration with Fred Zinnemann		
1953	Fort Ti	William Castle	First collaboration with William Castle		
1953	The 49th Man	Fred F. Sears			
1953	From Here to Eternity	Fred Zinnemann	Second collaboration with Fred Zinnemann		
1953	Slaves of Babylon	William Castle	Second collaboration with William Castle		
1954	The Caine Mutiny	Edward Dmytryk	Second collaboration with Edward Dmytryk		
1955	The Long Gray Line	John Ford			
1955	The Man from Laramie	Anthony Mann			
1955	Count Three and Pray	George Sherman	First collaboration with George Sherman		
1955	Picnic	Joshua Logan			
1956	Storm Center	Daniel Taradash			
1956	Nightfall	Jacques Tourneur			
1957	The Shadow on the Window	William Asher			
1957	The Garment Jungle	Vincent Sherman			
1957	The Hard Man	George Sherman	Second collaboration with George Sherman		
1958	Cowboy	Delmer Daves			
1958	Me and the Colonel	Peter Glenville			
1959	Gidget	Paul Wendkos	First collaboration with Paul Wendkos		
1959	They Came to Cordura	Robert Rossen			
1960	Song Without End	Charles Vidor			
1960	Midnight Lace	David Miller	Second collaboration with David Miller	Uncredited	
1961	A Raisin in the Sun	Daniel Petrie			
1961	Gidget Goes Hawaiian	Paul Wendkos	Second collaboration with Paul Wendkos		
1961	Sail a Crooked Ship	Irving Brecher			
1962	Five Finger Exercise	Daniel Mann			
1962	Diamond Head	Guy Green			
1963	The Man from the Diners' Club	Frank Tashlin			
1963	Gidget Goes to Rome	Paul Wendkos	Third collaboration with Paul Wendkos		
1964	The Young Lovers	Samuel Goldwyn Jr.			
1965	Major Dundee	Sam Peckinpah			
1966	Lord Love a Duck	George Axelrod			
1966	Dead Heat on a Merry-Go-Round	Bernard Girard			
1967	Barefoot in the Park	Gene Saks			
1969	The Secret of Santa Vittoria	Stanley Kramer	First collaboration with Stanley Kramer		
1970	R. P. M.	Stanley Kramer	Second collaboration with Stanley Kramer		
1971	Bless the Beasts and Children	Stanley Kramer	Third collaboration with Stanley Kramer		

Documentaries

Editor
Year	Film	Director	Notes
1943	Divide and Conquer	Frank Capra; Anatole Litvak	Uncredited

Shorts

Editor
Year	Film	Director
1934	In the Dog House	Arthur Ripley
1935	Restless Knights	Charles Lamont
1935	His Bridal Sweet	Alfred J. Goulding
1935	Three Little Beers	Del Lord
1936	Unrelated Relations	Del Lord
1936	Ants in the Pantry	Preston Black
1936	Movie Maniacs	Del Lord
1936	The Peppery Salt	Del Lord
1936	Disorder in the Court	Preston Black
1936	A Pain in the Pullman	Preston Black
1936	Mister Smarty	Preston Black
1936	Fibbing Fibbers	Preston Black
1936	Slippery Silks	Preston Black
1957	Horsing Around	Jules White
1958	Quiz Whizz	Jules White

TV series

Editor
Year	Title	Notes
1952	Cavalcade of America	1 episode
