= Riders of the Northwest Mounted =

1943 film by William Berke

- Theatrical release poster
- Directed by: William Berke
- Screenplay by: Fred Myton
- Produced by: Leon Barsha
- Starring: Russell Hayden; Dub Taylor; Bob Wills; Adele Mara; Dick Curtis; Richard Bailey
- Cinematography: Benjamin H. Kline
- Edited by: James Sweeney
- Production company: Columbia Pictures
- Distributed by: Columbia Pictures
- Release date: February 15, 1943
- Running time: 57 minutes
- Country: United States
- Language: English

Riders of the Northwest Mounted is a 1943 American Western film directed by William Berke and written by Fred Myton. The film stars Russell Hayden, Dub Taylor, Bob Wills, Adele Mara, Dick Curtis and Richard Bailey. The film was released on February 15, 1943, by Columbia Pictures.

== Cast ==
- Russell Hayden as Lucky Kerrigan
- Dub Taylor as Cannonball
- Bob Wills as Bob Wheeler
- Adele Mara as Gabrielle Renard
- Dick Curtis as Victor Renard
- Richard Bailey as Remi
- Jack Ingram as Jacques
- Leon McAuliffe as Chuck
- Vernon Steele as Capt. Blair
- Bill Hunter as Trapper
