= West of Cheyenne (1938 film) =

1938 film by Sam Nelson

- Directed by: Sam Nelson
- Written by: Ed Earl Repp
- Produced by: Harry L. Decker
- Starring: Charles Starrett; Iris Meredith; Bob Nolan
- Cinematography: Benjamin H. Kline
- Edited by: William A. Lyon
- Music by: Morris Stoloff
- Production company: Columbia Pictures
- Distributed by: Columbia Pictures
- Release date: June 30, 1938
- Running time: 59 minutes
- Country: United States
- Language: English

West of Cheyenne is a 1938 American Western film directed by Sam Nelson and starring Charles Starrett, Iris Meredith and Bob Nolan.

== Cast ==
- Charles Starrett as Brad Buckner
- Iris Meredith as Jean Wayne
- Bob Nolan as Foreman Bob Nolan
- Pat Brady as Cowhand Pat
- Dick Curtis as Link Murdock
- Edward LeSaint as J.B. Wayne
- Edmund Cobb as Henchman Dirkin
- Art Mix as Henchman Cinch
- Ernie Adams as Henchman Shorty
- Jack Rockwell as Sheriff
- John Tyrrell as Bartender Trigger
- Sons of the Pioneers as Cowhands / Musicians

== Bibliography ==
- Pitts, Michael R. Western Movies: A Guide to 5,105 Feature Films. McFarland, 2012.
