= Blazing Six Shooters =

1940 film by Joseph H. Lewis

- Theatrical release poster
- Directed by: Joseph H. Lewis
- Screenplay by: Paul Franklin
- Produced by: Irving Briskin
- Starring: Charles Starrett; Iris Meredith; Dick Curtis; Alan Bridge; George Cleveland; Henry Hall
- Cinematography: George Meehan
- Edited by: Richard Fantl
- Production company: Columbia Pictures
- Distributed by: Columbia Pictures
- Release date: April 11, 1940
- Running time: 61 minutes
- Country: United States
- Language: English

Blazing Six Shooters is a 1940 American Western film directed by Joseph H. Lewis and written by Paul Franklin. The film stars Charles Starrett, Iris Meredith, Dick Curtis, Alan Bridge, George Cleveland and Henry Hall. The film was released on April 11, 1940, by Columbia Pictures.

== Cast ==
- Charles Starrett as Jeff Douglas
- Iris Meredith as Janet Kenyon
- Dick Curtis as Lash Bender
- Alan Bridge as Bert Karsin
- George Cleveland as Mark Rawlins
- Henry Hall as Dan Kenyon
- Bob Nolan as Bob
- Stanley Brown as Cassidy
- John Tyrrell as Savage
- Eddie Laughton as Runyon
- Francis Walker as Shorty
- Edmund Cobb as Sheriff
- Bruce Bennett as Winthrop
