= Convicted Woman =

1940 film by Nick Grinde

- Directed by: Nick Grinde
- Screenplay by: Joseph Carole
- Story by: Martin Mooney; Alex Gottlieb
- Produced by: Ralph Cohn
- Starring: Rochelle Hudson; Frieda Inescort; June Lang; Lola Lane; Glenn Ford; Iris Meredith
- Cinematography: Benjamin Kline
- Edited by: James Sweeney
- Distributed by: Columbia Pictures
- Release date: January 31, 1940 (U.S.)
- Running time: 65 minutes
- Country: United States
- Language: English

Convicted Woman is a 1940 crime film starring Rochelle Hudson and directed by Nick Grinde. It is also known as Dames and Daughters of Today.

== Plot ==
Jobless Betty Andrews, although innocent, is convicted of a department store theft and, despite the best efforts of her lawyer and noted social worker Mary Ellis and of a reporter, Jim Brent, is sentenced to a year in the Curtiss House of Correction. Chief Matron Brackett rules with an iron hand with the aid of inmates Frankie Mason, "The Duchess", and Nita Lavore. One of the inmates commits suicide and a subsequent story by Jim on the prison conditions leads to Mary Ellis being made the supervisor of the correction center. Although initially reluctant to trust the new leader, Betty eventually warms to her. When ten girls are allowed to go home for Thanksgiving under the promise of returning by eleven P.M., Frankie and "The Duchess", having lost the power and privilege they enjoyed under the departed Matron Brackett, arrange to have Betty kidnapped so she can not return at the appointed time. Another of the girls telephones Jim and he soon finds Betty a prisoner at a deserted roadhouse. Jim rescues Betty and returns her to the correction center, a little late but, as it turns out, just in time for her to be handed a pardon by Mary Ellis.

== Cast ==
Actor	Role
Rochelle Hudson	Betty Andrews
Frieda Inescort	Attorney Mary Ellis
June Lang	Georgia Mason
Lola Lane	Hazel Wren
Glenn Ford	Jim Brent (Reporter)
Iris Meredith	Nita Lavore
Lorna Gray	Frankie Mason
Esther Dale	Chief Matron Brackett
William Farnum	Commissioner McNeill
Mary Field	Gracie Dunn
Beatrice Blinn	May Sorenson
June Gittelson	Tubby
Dorothy Appleby	Daisy
Donna Reed	convict (uncredited)
