= West of the Santa Fe =

1938 film by Sam Nelson

- Theatrical release poster
- Directed by: Sam Nelson
- Screenplay by: Bennett Cohen
- Produced by: Harry L. Decker
- Starring: Charles Starrett; Iris Meredith; Dick Curtis; Robert Fiske; LeRoy Mason; Bob Nolan
- Cinematography: Allen G. Siegler
- Edited by: William Lyon
- Production company: Columbia Pictures
- Distributed by: Columbia Pictures
- Release date: October 3, 1938
- Running time: 60 minutes
- Country: United States
- Language: English

West of the Santa Fe is a 1938 American Western film directed by Sam Nelson and written by Bennett Cohen. The film stars Charles Starrett, Iris Meredith, Dick Curtis, Robert Fiske, LeRoy Mason and Bob Nolan. The film was released on October 3, 1938, by Columbia Pictures.

== Cast ==
- Charles Starrett as Steve Lawlor
- Iris Meredith as Madge Conway
- Dick Curtis as Matt Taylor
- Robert Fiske as Frank Parker
- LeRoy Mason as Marshal McLain
- Bob Nolan as Bob
- Hank Bell as Hank
- Edmund Cobb as Barlow
- Clem Horton as Wager
- Dick Botiller as Foley
- Edward Hearn as Crane
- Edward LeSaint as Jeff Conway
- Buck Connors as Hardpan
