= Call of the Rockies (1938 film) =

1938 film by Alan James

- Poster for the film
- Directed by: Alan James
- Screenplay by: Ed Earl Repp
- Produced by: Harry L. Decker
- Starring: Charles Starrett; Donald Grayson; Iris Meredith
- Cinematography: Benjamin Kline
- Edited by: William Lyon
- Production company: Columbia Pictures
- Release date: April 30, 1938 (US)
- Running time: 54 minutes
- Country: United States
- Language: English

Call of the Rockies is a 1938 American Western film directed by Alan James, starring Charles Starrett, Donald Grayson, and Iris Meredith.

== Cast ==
- Charles Starrett as Clint Buckley
- Donald Grayson as Slim Grayson
- Iris Meredith as Ann Bradford
- Dick Curtis as Matt Stark
- Edward LeSaint as Judge Stockton
- Edmund Cobb as Barlow
- Art Mix as Trigger
- John Tyrrell as Swale
- George Chesebro as Monk
- Glenn Strange as Kelso
- Sons of the Pioneers
- Alan Bridge as Weston
- Fred Burns as Murdock
- Hank Bell as Rankin

== Production ==
The film, originally titled "Outlaws of the Big Bend", began production in the middle of January 1938. The picture was still in production in early March, and was originally scheduled for a March 30 release. However, by the middle of March, the release had been delayed until April 30. The Legion of Decency gave the film an A-1 rating, meaning they were "unobjectionable for general patronage".

== Reception ==
The Independent Exhibitor's Film Bulletin gave the film a positive review, calling it "A nicely made formula western with music that moves at mile-a-minute clip and has sufficient action for the most ardent western fans." They complimented the acting of Starrett, Meredith and Curtis, as well as the supporting cast. They also felt the direction was good, and the singing of Grayson and the Sons of the Pioneers added to the picture.
