= The Return of Wild Bill =

1940 film by Joseph H. Lewis

- Theatrical release poster
- Directed by: Joseph H. Lewis
- Screenplay by: Robert Lee Johnson; Fred Myton
- Story by: Walt Coburn
- Produced by: Leon Barsha
- Starring: Wild Bill Elliott; Iris Meredith; George Lloyd; Luana Walters; Edward LeSaint; Frank LaRue
- Cinematography: George Meehan
- Edited by: Richard Fantl
- Production company: Columbia Pictures
- Distributed by: Columbia Pictures
- Release date: June 27, 1940
- Running time: 60 minutes
- Country: United States
- Language: English

The Return of Wild Bill is a 1940 American Western film directed by Joseph H. Lewis and written by Robert Lee Johnson and Fred Myton. The film stars Wild Bill Elliott, Iris Meredith, George Lloyd, Luana Walters, Edward LeSaint and Frank LaRue. The film was released on June 27, 1940, by Columbia Pictures. It is the fourth and last in Columbia Pictures' series of four "Wild Bill Saunders" films, which began with The Taming of the West.

== Cast ==
- Wild Bill Elliott as Wild Bill Saunders
- Iris Meredith as Sammy Lou Griffin
- George Lloyd as Matt Kilgore
- Luana Walters as Kate Kilgore
- Edward LeSaint as Lige Saunders
- Frank LaRue as Ole Mitch
- Francis Walker as Jake Kilgore
- Chuck Morrison as Bart
- Dub Taylor as Cannonball
- Buel Bryant as Mike
- William Kellogg as Hep
- John Ince as Sam Griffin
- Jack Rockwell as Sheriff
- John Merton as Dusty Donahue
- Donald Haines as Bobby
