= Cattle Raiders =

1938 film by Sam Nelson

- Directed by: Sam Nelson
- Screenplay by: Joseph F. Poland; Ed Earl Repp
- Story by: Folmar Blangsted
- Produced by: Harry L. Decker
- Starring: Charles Starrett; Donald Grayson; Iris Meredith; Dick Curtis; Joseph Allen; Edward LeSaint
- Cinematography: John W. Boyle
- Edited by: Richard Fantl
- Production company: Columbia Pictures
- Distributed by: Columbia Pictures
- Release date: February 12, 1938
- Running time: 61 minutes
- Country: United States
- Language: English

Cattle Raiders is a 1938 American Western film directed by Sam Nelson and written by Joseph F. Poland and Ed Earl Repp. The film stars Charles Starrett, Donald Grayson, Iris Meredith, Dick Curtis, Joseph Allen and Edward LeSaint. The film was released on February 12, 1938, by Columbia Pictures.

== Plot ==
Tom returns, but finds out that he is now wanted, since his gun was found in a murder scene. Tom gets into a fight with Munro which he suspects his the murderer and collects a bullet from him, which he matches to the bullet used in the murder, however in the trial, the bullet evidence is ignored.

== Cast ==
- Charles Starrett as Tom Reynolds
- Donald Grayson as Slim Grayson
- Iris Meredith as Nancy Grayson
- Dick Curtis as Ed Munro
- Joseph Allen as Steve Reynolds
- Edward LeSaint as John Reynolds
- Edmund Cobb as Burke
- George Chesebro as Brand
- Edward Coxen as Doc Connors
- Steve Clark as Hank
- Art Mix as Keno
- Clem Horton as Slash
