= Valley of Terror =

1937 film directed by Albert Herman

- Theatrical release poster
- Directed by: Albert Herman
- Screenplay by: John T. Neville; Sherman L. Lowe; Stanley Roberts
- Based on: Game of Life by James Oliver Curwood
- Produced by: Maurice Conn
- Starring: Kermit Maynard; Harley Wood; John Merton; Jack Ingram; Roger Williams; Hank Bell; Dick Curtis; Frank McCarroll
- Cinematography: Jack Greenhalgh
- Edited by: Richard G. Wray
- Production company: Conn Pictures Corporation
- Distributed by: Ambassador Pictures
- Release date: January 20, 1937
- Running time: 57 minutes
- Country: United States
- Language: English

Valley of Terror is a 1937 American Western film directed by Albert Herman and written by John T. Neville, Sherman L. Lowe and Stanley Roberts. The film stars Kermit Maynard, Harley Wood, John Merton, Jack Ingram, Roger Williams, Hank Bell, Dick Curtis and Frank McCarroll. The film was released on January 20, 1937, by Ambassador Pictures.

== Cast ==
- Kermit Maynard as Bob Wilson
- Harley Wood as Mary Scott
- John Merton as Mark Flemming
- Jack Ingram as Spud Hayes
- Roger Williams as Slim
- Hank Bell as Sheriff Judson
- Dick Curtis as Buck
- Frank McCarroll as Hank
- Hal Price as Fielding
- Jack Casey as Clinton Deputy
- George Morrell as Lynch Mob Leader
- Blackie Whiteford as Bartender
