= One Man Justice =

1937 film by Leon Barsha

- Theatrical release poster
- Directed by: Leon Barsha
- Screenplay by: Paul Perez
- Story by: William Colt MacDonald
- Produced by: Harry L. Decker
- Starring: Charles Starrett; Barbara Weeks; Wally Wales; Jack Rube Clifford; Alan Bridge; Walter Downing
- Cinematography: John Stumar
- Edited by: William Lyon
- Production company: Columbia Pictures
- Distributed by: Columbia Pictures
- Release date: July 1, 1937
- Running time: 59 minutes
- Country: United States
- Language: English

One Man Justice is a 1937 American Western film directed by Leon Barsha and written by Paul Perez. The film stars Charles Starrett, Barbara Weeks, Wally Wales, Jack Rube Clifford, Alan Bridge and Walter Downing. The film was released on July 1, 1937, by Columbia Pictures.

== Cast ==
- Charles Starrett as Larry Clarke / Ted Crockett
- Barbara Weeks as Mary Crockett
- Wally Wales as Neal King
- Jack Rube Clifford as Sheriff Ben Adams
- Alan Bridge as Red Grindy
- Walter Downing as Doc Willat
- Mary Gordon as Bridget
- Jack Lipson as Slim
- Edmund Cobb as Tex Wiley
- Dick Curtis as Hank Skinner
- Maston Williams as Lefty Gates
- Harry Fleischmann as Joe Craig
