= Rio Grande (1938 film) =

1938 film

- Directed by: Sam Nelson
- Written by: Charles F. Royal
- Produced by: Irving Briskin
- Starring: Charles Starrett; Ann Doran; Bob Nolan
- Cinematography: Lucien Ballard
- Edited by: William A. Lyon
- Music by: Morris Stoloff
- Production company: Columbia Pictures
- Distributed by: Columbia Pictures
- Release date: December 8, 1938
- Running time: 58 minutes
- Country: United States
- Language: English

Rio Grande is a 1938 American western film directed by Sam Nelson and starring Charles Starrett, Ann Doran and Bob Nolan.

== Cast ==
- Charles Starrett as Cliff Houston
- Ann Doran as Jean Andrews
- Bob Nolan as Bob Stevens
- Dick Curtis as Ed Barker
- George Chesebro as Kruger
- Hank Bell as Hank
- Pat Brady as Pat
- Art Mix as Durkin
- Lee Prather as Goulding
- Sons of the Pioneers as Singing Ranch Hands

== Bibliography ==
- Hoffmann, Henryk. Western Movie References in American Literature. McFarland, 2012.
