= Trail of Vengeance =

1937 film

- Directed by: Sam Newfield
- Screenplay by: Fred Myton; George H. Plympton
- Story by: E.B. Mann
- Produced by: A. W. Hackel
- Starring: Johnny Mack Brown; Iris Meredith; Warner Richmond; Karl Hackett; Earle Hodgins; Frank LaRue
- Cinematography: Bert Longenecker
- Edited by: Robert Jahns
- Production company: Supreme Pictures Corporation
- Distributed by: Republic Pictures
- Release date: March 29, 1937
- Running time: 58 minutes
- Country: United States
- Language: English

Trail of Vengeance is a 1937 American Western film directed by Sam Newfield, written by Fred Myton and George H. Plympton, and starring Johnny Mack Brown, Iris Meredith, Warner Richmond, Karl Hackett, Earle Hodgins and Frank LaRue. It was released on March 29, 1937, by Republic Pictures.

== Cast ==
- Johnny Mack Brown as Dude Ramsay
- Iris Meredith as Jean Warner
- Warner Richmond as Link Carson
- Karl Hackett as Bert Pearson
- Earle Hodgins as Buck Andrews
- Frank LaRue as Tilden
- Frank Ellis as Henchman Red
- Lew Meehan as Henchman Billy O'Donnell
- Frank Ball as Steve Warner
- Dick Curtis as Henchman Cartwright
