= Riders of Black River =

1939 film by Norman Deming

- Theatrical release poster
- Directed by: Norman Deming
- Screenplay by: Bennett Cohen
- Story by: Ford Beebe
- Produced by: Harry L. Decker
- Starring: Charles Starrett; Iris Meredith; Dick Curtis; Stanley Brown; Bob Nolan; Francis Sayles
- Cinematography: George Meehan
- Edited by: William Lyon
- Production company: Columbia Pictures
- Distributed by: Columbia Pictures
- Release date: August 23, 1939
- Running time: 59 minutes
- Country: United States
- Language: English

Riders of Black River is a 1939 American Western film directed by Norman Deming and written by Bennett Cohen. The film stars Charles Starrett, Iris Meredith, Dick Curtis, Stanley Brown, Bob Nolan and Francis Sayles. The film was released on August 23, 1939, by Columbia Pictures.

== Cast ==
- Charles Starrett as Wade Patterson
- Iris Meredith as Linda Holden
- Dick Curtis as Blaize Carewe
- Stanley Brown as Terry Holden
- Bob Nolan as Bob
- Francis Sayles as Doc Josh Greene
- Edmund Cobb as Colt Foster
- Ethan Allen as Joel Matthews
- Carl Sepulveda as Rip Salter
- Olin Francis as Whit Kane
- Maston Williams as Ed Gills
- Forrest Taylor as Dave Patterson
