= Harry L. Decker =

American film producer

- Born: January 29, 1887; California, United States
- Died: October 14, 1959 (aged 72); Santa Barbara, California, United States
- Occupations: Editor, Producer
- Years active: 1913–1940 (film)

Harry L. Decker (1887–1959) was an American film producer associated with Columbia Pictures where he mainly oversaw production on western films. As an editor he was active in Hollywood from the 1910s through the 1930s. As a producer, he primarily worked on B-movie Westerns.

He also produced the 1937 ice hockey-themed mystery The Game That Kills starring Rita Hayworth. He began his career in the silent era as a film editor, working at a variety of studios.

== Biography ==
Harry Decker was born in California to Zachary Decker and Alice Burbank. As a young child, he lost an eye in an accident. After working as an editor at Thomas Ince pictures, Charles Ray studios, and Columbia Pictures — where he often worked on films by director Hunt Stromberg — he transitioned into a new role as a producer.

== Selected filmography ==
=== Editor ===
- Mary's Ankle (1920)
- Homer Comes Home (1920)
- 45 Minutes from Broadway (1920)
- The Woman in the Suitcase (1920)
- What's Your Husband Doing? (1920)
- The Old Swimmin' Hole (1921)
- A Midnight Bell (1921)
- R.S.V.P. (1921)
- Alias Julius Caesar (1922)
- The Deuce of Spades (1922)
- A Tailor-Made Man (1922)
- The Barnstormer (1922)
- Smudge (1922)
- The Girl I Loved (1923)
- A Cafe in Cairo (1924)
- Soft Shoes (1925)
- Silent Sanderson (1925)
- The Prairie Pirate (1925)

=== Producer ===
- The Gate Crasher (1928)
- The Kid's Clever (1929)
- Scandal (1929)
- Girl Overboard (1929)
- Gallant Defender (1935)
- Law Beyond the Range (1935)
- Dangerous Intrigue (1936)
- Code of the Range (1936)
- The Cowboy Star (1936)
- Shakedown (1936)
- Motor Madness (1937)
- Two-Fisted Sheriff (1937)
- One Man Justice (1937)
- The Game That Kills (1937)
- Outlaws of the Prairie (1937)
- Two Gun Law (1937)
- Trapped (1937)
- Westbound Mail (1937)
- Cattle Raiders (1938)
- West of the Santa Fe (1938)
- Call of the Rockies (1938)
- Law of the Plains (1938)
- The Colorado Trail (1938)
- West of Cheyenne (1938)
- South of Arizona (1938)
- Spoilers of the Range (1939)
- Riders of Black River (1939)
- Outpost of the Mounties (1939)
- The Thundering West (1939)
- The Man from Sundown (1939)
- Western Caravans (1939)
- The Stranger from Texas (1939)
- Texas Stampede (1939)
- Bullets for Rustlers (1940)
