= Trapped (1937 film) =

1937 film

- Directed by: Leon Barsha
- Written by: Claude Rister; John Rathmell
- Produced by: Harry L. Decker
- Starring: Charles Starrett; Peggy Stratford; Robert Middlemass
- Cinematography: Allen G. Siegler
- Edited by: William A. Lyon
- Music by: Morris Stoloff
- Production company: Columbia Pictures
- Distributed by: Columbia Pictures
- Release date: March 3, 1937
- Running time: 56 minutes
- Country: United States
- Language: English

Trapped is a 1937 American western film directed by Leon Barsha and starring Charles Starrett, Peggy Stratford and Robert Middlemass. It was produced and distributed by Columbia Pictures.

== Cast ==
- Charles Starrett as Ted Haley
- Peggy Stratford as Adele Rothert
- Robert Middlemass as Sol Rothert
- Allan Sears as Cal
- Ted Oliver as Ike Britt
- Lew Meehan as 'Moose' Nelson
- Edward Peil Sr. as Bill Ashley
- Jack Rockwell as Tom Haggard
- Edward LeSaint as Doctor
- Francis Sayles as Chong

== Bibliography ==
- Fetrow, Alan G. . Sound films, 1927-1939: a United States Filmography. McFarland, 1992.
- Pitts, Michael R. Western Movies: A Guide to 5,105 Feature Films. McFarland, 2012.
