= The Lone Prairie =

1942 film by William A. Berke

- Directed by: William Berke
- Screenplay by: Fred Myton
- Story by: J. Benton Cheney; Ed Earl Repp
- Produced by: Leon Barsha
- Starring: See below
- Cinematography: Benjamin H. Kline
- Edited by: Charles Nelson
- Distributed by: Columbia Pictures
- Release date: 15 October 1942
- Running time: 58 minutes
- Country: United States
- Language: English

The Lone Prairie is a 1942 American Western film directed by William Berke. It is one of a series of Westerns that Berke directed with the trio of Russell Hayden, Dub Taylor, and Bob Wills. It was produced and distributed by Columbia Pictures.

== Cast ==
- Russell Hayden as Lucky Dawson
- Dub Taylor as Cannonball
- Bob Wills as Bob
- Ernie Adams as Judge Barstow
- Sandy Guymon as Bill Slade
- Kermit Maynard as Henchman
- The Texas Playboys
