= A Lawman Is Born =

1937 film by Sam Newfield

- Directed by: Sam Newfield
- Written by: Harry F. Olmsted (story); George H. Plympton (writer)
- Produced by: A.W. Hackel (producer)
- Starring: See below
- Cinematography: Bert Longenecker
- Edited by: S. Roy Luby
- Production company: Supreme Pictures
- Distributed by: Republic Pictures
- Release date: June 21, 1937
- Running time: 58 minutes
- Country: United States
- Language: English

A Lawman Is Born is a 1937 American Western film directed by Sam Newfield.

== Plot summary ==
Tom Mitchell is a wanted man that becomes the Sheriff after the previous Sheriff is killed, however Brownlee arrives and reveals Tom's identity.

== Cast ==
- Johnny Mack Brown as Tom Mitchell
- Iris Meredith as Beth Graham
- Warner Richmond as Kane Briscoe
- Mary MacLaren as Martha Lance
- Dick Curtis as Lefty Drogan
- Earle Hodgins as Sheriff Rock Lance
- Charles King as Bert Moscript
- Frank LaRue as Graham
- Al St. John as Eli Root
- Steve Clark as Sam Brownlee
- Jack C. Smith as Ike Manton
