= Pardon My Gun (1942 film) =

- Directed by: William Berke
- Written by: Wyndham Gittens
- Produced by: Jack Fier
- Starring: Charles Starrett; Alma Carroll; Arthur Hunnicut; Texas Jim Lewis
- Cinematography: George Meehan
- Edited by: Mel Thorsen
- Production company: Columbia Pictures
- Release date: December 1, 1942
- Running time: 56 minutes
- Country: United States
- Language: English

Pardon My Gun is a 1942 Western film directed by William Berke.

== Cast ==
- Charles Starrett as Steve Randall
- Alma Carroll as Dodie Cameron
- Arthur Hunnicutt as Arkansas
- Noah Beery as Judge Hackett
- Dick Curtis as Clint Hayes
- Ted Mapes as Ace
- Lloyd Bridges as Whitey
