= Iris Meredith =

American actress (1915–1980)

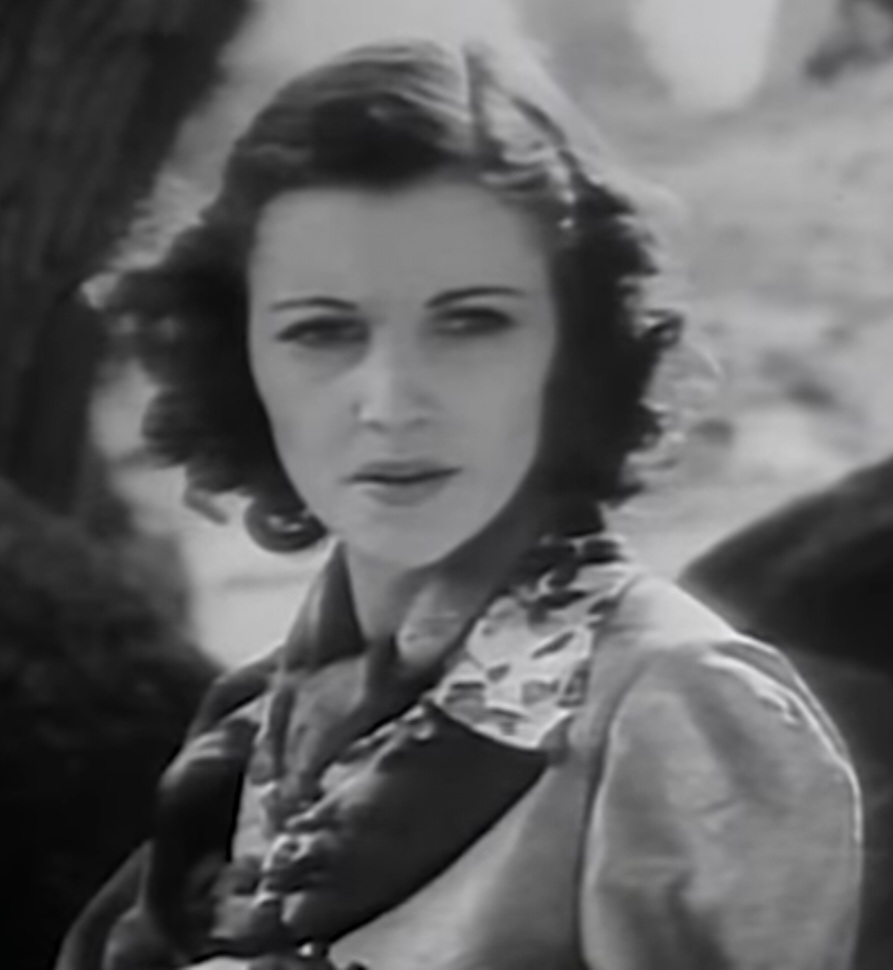
- Meredith in The Mystery of the Hooded Horsemen (1937)
- Born: Iris Shunn; June 3, 1915; Sioux City, Iowa, U.S.
- Died: January 22, 1980 (aged 64); Los Angeles, California, U.S.
- Resting place: Forest Lawn Memorial Park, Glendale, California
- Occupation: Actress
- Years active: 1930s–1940s
- Spouse: Abby Berlin

Iris Meredith (born Iris Shunn; June 3, 1915 – January 22, 1980) was a B-movie actress of the 1930s and 1940s film era. She starred mostly in heroine roles, in westerns.

== Early years ==
Meredith was born in Sioux City, Iowa, but grew up in Eagle Rock, California. She was active in journalism and dramatics at Eagle Rock High School, from which she graduated. Both of her parents died while Iris was in her teens, forcing her into the working world at an early age. She worked as a cashier in a Los Angeles theater before she became an actress.

== Career ==
In 1935 she joined the Fox studio (as Iris Shunn), as a member of its stock company, playing incidental roles without screen credit. She was released after one year and joined Columbia Pictures, which changed her screen name to Iris Meredith and promoted her immediately to leading-lady status. She was featured opposite Columbia's leading cowboy star Charles Starrett, and appeared in most of his films through 1940. She also worked in Columbia short subjects, notably the serials The Spider's Web (1938), and Overland with Kit Carson (1939), and a two-reel comedy with Charley Chase, His Bridal Fright (1940).

When Starrett withdrew from westerns, Columbia disbanded the unit and Iris Meredith left the studio. She joined the small Producers Releasing Corporation studio in 1942, and was featured in two low-budget westerns there.

== Personal life and death ==
Meredith married one of her Columbia co-workers, assistant director Abby Berlin, and retired from the screen, returning only once (to Columbia, in 1951) for a bit role in the "B" melodrama Chain of Circumstance.

In her late fifties, she was diagnosed with oral cancer that resulted in the surgical removal of part of her jaw and tongue, which disfigured her face and affected her speech. She seldom appeared in public, but in 1975 she did accept an invitation to a convention of western and serial fans, where she wore a veil over her face and was treated as a special guest. The oral cancer finally claimed her life on January 22, 1980, in Los Angeles, California. She was 64 years old. She is interred at Forest Lawn Memorial Park in Glendale, California.

== Partial filmography ==
- Hat Check Girl (1932) - Sales Lady (uncredited)
- Roman Scandals (1933) - Shantytown Resident / Goldwyn Girl (uncredited)
- Lottery Lover (1935) - Manicurist (uncredited)
- George White's 1935 Scandals (1935) - Miss Smith - Secretary (uncredited)
- Tumbling Tumbleweeds (1935) - Girl (uncredited)
- Ticket to Paradise (1936) - Girl (uncredited)
- Bulldog Edition (1936) - Camille Club Hatcheck Girl (uncredited)
- The Cowboy Star (1936) - Mary Baker
- Rio Grande Ranger (1936) - Sandra Cullen
- The Gambling Terror (1937) - Betty Garret
- Trail of Vengeance (1937) - Jean Warner
- A Lawman Is Born (1937) - Beth Graham
- The Mystery of the Hooded Horsemen (1937) - Nancy Wilson
- Outlaws of the Prairie (1937) - Judy Garfield
- All American Sweetheart (1937) - Alice (uncredited)
- Murder Is News (1937) - Ann Leslie
- Little Miss Roughneck (1938) - Girl (uncredited)
- Cattle Raiders (1938) - Nancy Grayson
- Call of the Rockies (1938) - Ann Bradford
- Law of the Plains (1938) - Marion McGowan / Norton
- West of Cheyenne (1938) - Jean Wayne
- South of Arizona (1938) - Ann Madison
- I Am the Law (1938) - Eddie's Girlfriend (uncredited)
- The Colorado Trail (1938) - Joan Randall
- West of the Santa Fe (1938) - Madge Conway
- The Spider's Web (1938, Serial) - Nita Van Sloan
- The Thundering West (1939) - Helen Patterson
- Texas Stampede (1939) - Joan Cameron
- First Offenders (1939) - Mary Kent
- Spoilers of the Range (1939) - Madge Patterson
- Western Caravans (1939) - Joyce Thompson
- The Man from Sundown (1939) - Barbara Kellogg
- Overland with Kit Carson (1939, Serial) - Carmelita Gonzalez
- Riders of Black River (1939) - Linda Holden
- Outpost of the Mounties (1939) - Norma Daniels
- Those High Grey Walls (1939) - Mary MacAuley
- The Taming of the West (1939) - Pepper Jenkins
- Beware Spooks! (1939) - Babe, Spook House Ticket Seller (uncredited)
- Two-Fisted Rangers (1939) - Betty Webster
- Convicted Woman (1940) - Nita Lavore
- Blazing Six Shooters (1940) - Janet Kenyon
- The Man from Tumbleweeds (1940) - 'Spunky' Cameron
- Texas Stagecoach (1940) - Jean Harper
- The Return of Wild Bill (1940) - Sammy Lou Griffin
- The Green Archer (1940, Serial) - Valerie Howett
- Thundering Frontier (1940) - Norma Belknap
- Caught in the Act (1941) - Lucy Ripportella
- The Son of Davy Crockett (1941) - Doris Mathews
- Louisiana Purchase (1941) - Lawyer's secretary
- The Rangers Take Over (1942) - Jean Lorin
- The Kid Rides Again (1943) - Joan Ainsley
- Chain of Circumstance (1951) - Minor Role (uncredited) (final film role)
