= Ernie Adams (actor) =

American actor (1885–1947)

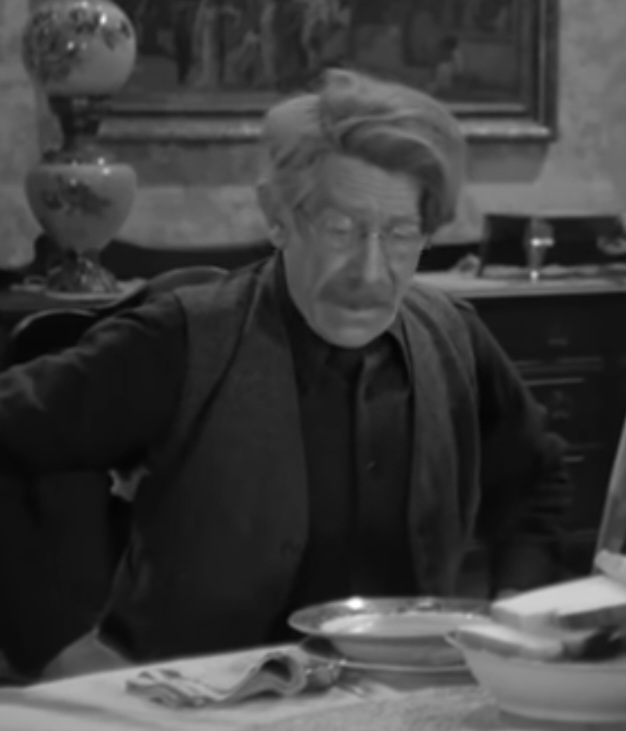
- Adams in Invisible Ghost (1941)
- Born: Ernest Stephen Dumarais; June 18, 1885; San Francisco, California, U.S.
- Died: November 26, 1947 (aged 62); Hollywood, California, U.S.
- Resting place: Valhalla Memorial Park Cemetery
- Other names: Ernest S. Adams, Ernie S. Adams (billing)
- Occupations: Vaudevillian; actor; writer
- Years active: 1919-1947

Ernie Adams (born Ernest Stephen Dumarais; June 18, 1885 – November 26, 1947) was an American vaudevillian performer, stage and screen character actor and writer, he appeared primarily in small uncredited parts.

== Biography ==
Adams was also billed as Ernest S. Adams and Ernie S. Adams.

He appeared in vaudeville, theater, and film. He started his career in musical comedy on Broadway theatre. Along with his wife Berdonna Gilbert, he formed the vaudeville team "Gilbert and Adams". He appeared in more than 400 films starting from the silent era between 1919 and 1948, and was particularly known for playing shady characters. On Broadway, Adams appeared in Toot-Toot! (1918).

On November 26, 1947, Adams died of an acute pulmonary edema at the West Olympic Sanitarium in Los Angeles, California, aged 62. He is buried in Valhalla Memorial Park in North Hollywood.

== Selected filmography ==
- A Regular Girl (1919)
- The Show (1922)
- The Beloved Brute (1924)
- Curlytop (1924)
- The Thundering Herd (1925)
- Pony Express (1925)
- The Best People (1925)
- Where the Worst Begins (1925)
- Lord Jim (1925)
- The Blackbird (1926)
- The Jazz Girl (1926)
- The Valley of Bravery (1926)
- Hair-Trigger Baxter (1926)
- Pals in Paradise (1926)
- Jewels of Desire (1927)
- Melting Millions (1927)
- Nevada (1927)
- The Main Event (1927)
- The Gay Defender (1927)
- Bare Knees (1928)
- Stool Pigeon (1928)
- Forgotten Faces (1928)
- Tenth Avenue (1928)
- What a Night! (1928)
- A Woman's Way (1928)
- One Splendid Hour (1929)
- The Fighting Legion (1930)
- The Galloping Ghost (1931, Serial)
- Night Beat (1931)
- Is There Justice? (1931)
- The Hurricane Express (1932)
- The Pride of the Legion (1932)
- The Shadow of the Eagle (1932)
- Breed of the Border (1933)
- West of Singapore (1933)
- Galloping Romeo (1933)
- Found Alive (1933)
- It Happened One Night (1934) as The Bag Thief (uncredited)
- We're Not Dressing (1934)
- Hell Bent for Love (1934)
- Men of the Night (1934)
- The Law of the Wild (1934)
- Badge of Honor (1934)
- The Prescott Kid (1934)
- The Miracle Rider (1935)
- Men of the Hour (1935)
- Trails End (1935)
- My Man Godfrey (1936)
- Road Gang (1936)
- Two-Fisted Sheriff (1937)
- San Quentin (1937) as Fink
- The Painted Trail (1938)
- West of Cheyenne (1938)
- The Purple Vigilantes (1938)
- Gun Packer (1938)
- The Man from Sundown (1939)
- The Invisible Killer (1939)
- The Man with Nine Lives (1940)
- The Golden Trail (1940)
- Enemy Agent (1940)
- The Son of Monte Cristo (1940)
- The Pinto Kid (1941)
- Road Agent (1941)
- Cactus Makes Perfect (1942)
- The Lone Prairie (1942)
- Stand By All Networks (1942)
- The Pride of the Yankees (1942) as Miller Huggins
- Phony Express (1943)
- Murder, My Sweet (1944)
- Lake Placid Serenade (1944)
- Ghost Guns (1944)
- Louisiana Hayride (1944)
- Arizona Whirlwind (1944)
- The Mysterious Mr. Valentine (1946)
- It's a Wonderful Life (1946) - Ed
- The Law Comes to Gunsight (1947)
- Son of Zorro (1947)
- Robin Hood of Monterey (1947)
- Trailing Danger (1947)
- Yankee Fakir (1947)
