= Outlaws of the Prairie =

1937 film by Sam Nelson

- Theatrical release poster
- Directed by: Sam Nelson
- Screenplay by: Ed Earl Repp
- Produced by: Harry L. Decker
- Starring: Charles Starrett; Donald Grayson; Iris Meredith
- Cinematography: John Boyle
- Edited by: William Lyon
- Production company: Columbia Pictures
- Release date: December 31, 1937 (US)
- Running time: 58 minutes
- Country: United States
- Language: English

Outlaws of the Prairie is a 1937 American Western film directed by Sam Nelson, starring Charles Starrett, Donald Grayson, and Iris Meredith.

== Cast ==
- Charles Starrett as Dart Collins
- Donald Grayson as Slim Grayson
- Iris Meredith as Judy Garfield
- Norman Willis as William Lupton
- Dick Curtis as Dragg
- Edward LeSaint as Lafe Garfield
- Edmund Cobb as Jed Stevens
- Art Mix as Lawton
- Steve Clark as Cobb
- Hank Bell as Jim
- Earle Hodgins as Neepah
- Lee Shumway as Capt. MacMillian
- Sons of the Pioneers
