= Sam Nelson =

American film director (1896–1963)

- Born: May 11, 1896; Whittier, California, US
- Died: May 1, 1963 (aged 66); Hollywood, California, US
- Occupation: Film director
- Years active: 1925–1963

Sam Nelson (1896–1963) was an American film director who worked from the end of the silent era through the early 1960s. While most of his film work was in the assistant director role, he did direct over twenty films during the 1930s and 1940s, all of which were Westerns. As an assistant director, he worked on such productions as Pennies from Heaven, And Then There Were None, All the King's Men, the original 3:10 to Yuma, Some Like It Hot, A Raisin in the Sun, and Spartacus. In addition, he appeared in over a dozen films in small acting roles.

== Filmography ==
(Per AFI database)

=== Director ===
- Outlaws of the Prairie (1937)
- Cattle Raiders (1938)
- Law of the Plains (1938)
- West of Cheyenne (1938)
- The Great Adventures of Wild Bill Hickok (1938)
- South of Arizona (1938)
- The Colorado Trail (1938)
- West of the Santa Fe (1938)
- Rio Grande (1938)
- Law of the Plains (1938)
- North of the Yukon (1939)
- Mandrake the Magician (1939)
- Western Caravans (1939)
- The Man from Sundown (1939)
- Overland with Kit Carson (1939)
- Konga, the Wild Stallion (1939)
- Parents on Trial (1939)
- The Stranger from Texas (1939)
- The Thundering West (1939)
- Pioneers of the Frontier (1940)
- Bullets for Rustlers (1940)
- Prairie Schooners (1940)
- Outlaws of the Panhandle (1941)
- Sagebrush Law (1943)
- The Avenging Rider (1943)

=== Assistant director ===
- The Midnight Flyer (1925)
- Red Hot Hoofs (1926)
- Her Father Said No (1927)
- Breed of the Sunsets (1928)
- Dog Law (1928)
- The Fightin' Redhead (1928)
- Lightning Speed (1928)
- The Little Buckaroo (1928)
- Fury of the Wild (1929)
- Mexicali Rose (1929)
- The Song of Love (1929)
- Wall Street (1929)
- The Yellowback (1929)
- The Melody Man (1930)
- Call of the West (1930)
- Guilty? (1930)
- Personality (1930)
- Rain or Shine (1930)
- A Royal Romance (1930)
- Way Back Home (1931)
- Dirigible (1931)
- The Flood (1931)
- Arizona (1931)
- Washington Merry-Go-Round (1932)
- The Night Club Lady (1932)
- No More Orchids (1932)
- The Last Man (1932)
- Virtue (1932)
- As the Devil Commands (1932)
- The Fighting Code (1933)
- Thrill Hunter (1933)
- Ann Carver's Profession (1933)
- When Strangers Marry (1933)
- More Than a Secretary (1936)
- Pennies From Heaven (1936)
- They Met in a Taxi (1936)
- The Old Wyoming Trail (1937)
- Life Begins with Love (1937)
- Let's Get Married (1937)
- Murder in Greenwich Village (1937)
- Two Fisted Sheriff (1937)
- Venus Makes Trouble (1937)
- Girls Can Play (1937)
- The Game That Kills (1937)
- Women in Prison (1938)
- The Thundering West (1939)
- Texas Stampede (1939)
- Only Angels Have Wings (1939)
- Arizona (1940)
- International Lady (1941)
- The Corsican Brothers (1942)
- Bandit Ranger (1942)
- Friendly Enemies (1942)
- A Gentleman After Dark (1942)
- Fighting Frontier (1943)
- Jack London (1943)
- Lady of Burlesque (1943)
- The North Star (1943)
- The Outlaw (1943)
- The Hairy Ape (1944)
- Guest in the House (1944)
- Take It Big (1944)
- And Then There Were None (1945)
- Delightfully Dangerous (1945)
- Getting Gertie's Garter (1945)
- Strange Holiday (1945)
- A Walk in the Sun (1946)
- Gallant Journey (1946)
- I've Always Loved You (1946)
- The Return of Monte Cristo (1946)
- The Walls Came Tumbling Down (1946)
- It Had to Be You (1947)
- I Surrender Dear (1948)
- The Lady from Shanghai (1948)
- The Return of October (1948)
- Triple Threat (1948)
- The Doolins of Oklahoma (1949)
- Tell It to the Judge (1949)
- The Walking Hills (1949)
- All the King's Men (1950)
- Cargo to Capetown (1950)
- No Sad Songs for Me (1950)
- The Brave Bulls (1951)
- The Family Secret (1951)
- My True Story (1951)
- Santa Fe (1951)
- Two of a Kind (1951)
- Affair in Trinidad (1952)
- The Four Poster (1953)
- Flame of Calcutta (1953)
- The Member of the Wedding (1953)
- Conquest of Cochise (1953)
- Miss Sadie Thompson (1954)
- The Iron Glove (1954)
- Jesse James vs. the Daltons (1954)
- Three Hours to Kill (1954)
- They Rode West (1954)
- My Sister Eileen (1955)
- The Violent Men (1955)
- Uranium Boom (1956)
- You Can't Run Away from It (1956)
- The White Squaw (1956)
- The Last Frontier (1956)
- Reprisal! (1956)
- Don't Knock the Rock (1957)
- Decision at Sundown (1957)
- The Man Who Turned to Stone (1957)
- The Tall T (1957)
- 3:10 to Yuma (1957)
- Cowboy (1958)
- The Last Hurrah (1958)
- Gunman's Walk (1958)
- Good Day for a Hanging (1959)
- The Flying Fontaines (1959)
- Some Like It Hot (1959)
- Let No Man Write My Epitaph (1960)
- Comanche Station (1960)
- By Love Possessed (1961)
- A Raisin in the Sun (1961)
- The Wackiest Ship in the Army (1961)
- Don't Knock the Twist (1962)
- The Wild Westerners (1962)
- Sail a Crooked Ship (1962)
- Experiment in Terror (1962)
- 13 Frightened Girls (1963)
- Diamond Head (1963)
