= Richard Fantl =

American film editor

- Born: October 21, 1903; Chicago, Illinois, United States
- Died: March 29, 1961 (aged 57); Los Angeles, California; United States
- Occupation: Editor
- Years active: 1935–1961 (film)

Richard Fantl (1903–1961) was an American film editor. He was under contract to the Hollywood studio Columbia Pictures for many years. He later worked in television.

== Selected filmography ==
- Mariners of the Sky/Navy Born (1936)
- Westbound Mail (1937)
- Murder in Greenwich Village (1937)
- Women in Prison (1938)
- The Durango Kid (1940)
- Blazing Six Shooters (1940)
- Nobody's Children (1940)
- I Was a Prisoner on Devil's Island (1941)
- A Man's World (1942)
- Stand By All Networks (1942)
- Rough, Tough and Ready (1945)
- Drifting Along (1946)
- Galloping Thunder (1946)
- The Woman from Tangier (1948)
- Kazan (1949)
- When the Redskins Rode (1951)
- Al Jennings of Oklahoma (1951)
- Indian Uprising (1952)

== Bibliography ==
- Wheeler W. Dixon. Lost in the Fifties: Recovering Phantom Hollywood. SIU Press, 2005.
