= Benjamin H. Kline =

American cinematographer and film director (1894–1974)

- Born: Benjamin Harrison Kline; July 11, 1894; Birmingham, Alabama, U.S.
- Died: January 7, 1974 (aged 79); Hollywood, Los Angeles, California, U.S.
- Resting place: Hollywood Forever Cemetery
- Other names: Ben Kline; Ben H. Kline; Benjamin Kline
- Occupations: Cinematographer; Film director
- Years active: 1920–1972

Benjamin Harrison Kline (July 11, 1894 – January 7, 1974) was an American cinematographer and film director. He was the father of Richard H. Kline.

== Biography ==
Kline was born in Birmingham, Alabama, and started his career as a cinematographer in 1920 with Universal Pictures' Red Lane. Over his career he shot about 350 films and television shows, a number that includes many serials and a large number of Three Stooges short subjects for Columbia Pictures. He worked up through about 1972. His son Richard H. Kline was also a noted cinematographer. Kline also directed eight films during the period of 1931–1945.

== Partial filmography ==
=== As director ===
Kline directed seven films, one Rin Tin Tin serial and six westerns:

- The Lightning Warrior (1931)
- Cowboy in the Clouds (1943)
- Sundown Valley (1944)
- Cowboy from Lonesome River (1944)
- Cyclone Prairie Rangers (1944)
- Saddle Leather Law (1944)
- Sagebrush Heroes (1945)

Sources also suggest that Kline replaced B. Reeves Eason as uncredited director of the serial The Galloping Ghost in 1931.

=== As cinematographer ===
- Hitchin' Posts (1920)
- After Your Own Heart (1921)
- The Rough Diamond (1921)
- Trailin' (1921)
- The Lady from Longacre (1921)
- The Night Horsemen (1921)
- A Ridin' Romeo (1921)
- Hands Off! (1921)
- Sky High (1922)
- Chasing the Moon (1922)
- Up and Going (1922)
- Wolf Law (1922)
- McGuire of the Mounted (1923)
- The Six-Fifty (1923)
- The Untameable (1923)
- Pure Grit (1923)
- The Scarlet West (1925)
- Red Clay (1927)
- Sensation Seekers (1927)
- Painted Faces (1929)
- Peacock Alley (1930)
- The Last of the Lone Wolf (1930)
- Call of the West (1930)
- The Fighting Fool (1932)
- The Last Man (1932)
- War Correspondent (1932)
- Texas Cyclone (1932)
- The California Trail (1933)
- Police Car 17 (1933)
- The Wrecker (1933)
- Shadows of Sing Sing (1933)
- When Strangers Marry (1933)
- East of Fifth Avenue (1933)
- Hold the Press (1933)
- The Ninth Guest (1934)
- The Hell Cat (1934)
- The Prescott Kid (1934)
- The Man Trailer (1934)
- The Line-Up (1934)
- Men of the Hour (1935)
- Guard That Girl (1935)
- The Revenge Rider (1935)
- Riding Wild (1935)
- Super Speed (1935)
- End of the Trail (1936)
- Speed to Spare (1937)
- West of Cheyenne (1938)
- South of Arizona (1938)
- The Colorado Trail (1938)
- The Great Adventures of Wild Bill Hickok (1938 serial)
- Call of the Rockies (1938)
- Extortion (1938)
- Law of the Plains (1938)
- Women in Prison (1938)
- Flying G-Men (1939 serial)
- Mandrake the Magician (1939 serial)
- Overland with Kit Carson (1939 serial)
- The Man They Could Not Hang (1939)
- Scandal Sheet (1939)
- Cafe Hostess (1940)
- Nobody's Children (1940)
- Before I Hang (1940)
- Roaring Frontiers (1941)
- Hands Across the Rockies (1941)
- The Lone Prairie (1942)
- Ever Since Venus (1944)
- Tahiti Nights (1944)
- Detour (1945)
- Rolling Home (1946)
- Joe Palooka, Champ (1946)
- Strange Journey (1946)
- I Ring Doorbells (1946)
- Shoot to Kill (1947)
- Half Past Midnight (1948)
- Tough Assignment (1949)
- The Judge (1949)
- Omoo-Omoo, the Shark God (1949)
- Miami Exposé (1956)
- Zombies of Mora Tau (1957)
