= Hank Bell =

American film actor (1892–1950)

- Born: January 21, 1892; Los Angeles, California, U.S.
- Died: February 4, 1950 (aged 58); Hollywood, California, U.S.
- Occupation: Actor
- Years active: 1920-1950

Hank Bell (January 21, 1892 – February 4, 1950) was an American film actor. He appeared in more than 370 films between 1920 and 1950. He was born in Los Angeles, California, and died in Hollywood, California, from a heart attack. Bell was nicknamed "Handlebar" for his mustache, which sometimes measured 18 inches from tip to tip.

== Selected filmography ==
Year	Title	Role
1920	The Last Straw	Pat Webb (film debut)
1923	Don Quickshot of the Rio Grande	Henchman
1925	Gold and Grit	Sheriff
1926	Double Daring	Lee Falcon
1926	The Terror	Sheriff
1929	Rio Rita	Texas Ranger (uncredited)
1930	Under a Texas Moon	Cannon Loader (uncredited)
1930	Abraham Lincoln	Townsman in Offut's Store (uncredited)
1930	Billy the Kid	Henchman Polka Dot (uncredited)
1930	Breed of the West	Sheriff Cole
1932	South of Santa Fe	Henchman
1932	The Wyoming Whirlwind	Henchman
1932	Law and Order	Barfly (uncredited)
1935	The Arizonian	Man Paying Fine in Courtroom (uncredited)
1935	The Cheyenne Tornado	Sheriff (uncredited)
1935	Dante's Inferno	Carnival Worker (uncredited)
1935	Blazing Guns	Sam, Vigilante (uncredited)
1935	Call of the Wild	Waiter (uncredited)
1935	Westward Ho	Mark Wyatt
1936	The Trail of the Lonesome Pine	Tolliver Clan Member (uncredited)
1936	Mr. Deeds Goes to Town	Unemployed Farmer in Line and Courtroom (uncredited)
1937	Way Out West	Barfly (uncredited)
1937	Wells Fargo	Medical Attendant (uncredited)
1937	Two Gun Law	Cookie
1937	Outlaws of the Prairie	Jim
1937	Valley of Terror	Sheriff Judson
1938	The Buccaneer	Pirate (uncredited)
1938	The Texans	Soldier (uncredited)
1938	Rio Grande	Hank
1938	Gun Law	Townsman disarming the Sheriff (uncredited)
1938	Call of the Rockies	Rankin
1939	Dodge City	Arrested Mustached Man (uncredited)
1939	Frontier Marshal	Townsman with Large Mustache (uncredited)
1939	The Thundering West	Tucson
1939	The Taming of the West	Marshall Bates
1940	Boom Town	Hank - Man in Dance Hall (uncredited)
1940	My Little Chickadee	Townsman (uncredited)
1940	Virginia City	Barfly (uncredited)
1940	Dark Command	Townsman (uncredited)
1940	The Westerner	Deputy (uncredited)
1940	Covered Wagon Trails	Sheriff
1941	Western Union	Telegraph Worker (uncredited)
1941	They Died with Their Boots On	1st Michigan Officer (uncredited)
1941	Texas	Hank - King Ranch Foreman (uncredited)
1942	Valley of the Sun	Hank
1942	Ride 'Em Cowboy	Napping Cowpoke with Rake (uncredited)
1942	The Great Man's Lady	Man #1 - Hoyt City (uncredited)
1943	The Ox-Bow Incident	Red (uncredited)
1943	The Desperadoes	Poker Player (uncredited)
1943	Hit the Ice	Sleigh Driver (uncredited)
1944	The Miracle of Morgan's Creek	Homecoming Spectator (uncredited)
1944	The Great Moment	Onlooker (uncredited)
1945	Salome, Where She Danced	Stagecoach Driver (uncredited)
1945	Flame of Barbary Coast	Hank (uncredited)
1945	Along Came Jones	Posse Rider (uncredited)
1946	The Virginian	Rider with News of Teacher (uncredited)
1946	The Wife of Monte Cristo	Minor Role (uncredited)
1946	My Darling Clementine	Opera House Patron (uncredited)
1946	Duel in the Sun	McCanles Ranch Hand (uncredited)
1947	California	Wagon Driver (uncredited)
1947	Trail Street	Pedestrian Passing Newspaper Office (uncredited)
1947	The Egg and I	Reveler at Country Dance (uncredited)
1949	The Fighting Kentuckian	Militiaman at Festival (uncredited)
1950	Fancy Pants	Barfly (uncredited)
1950	Gunslingers	Hollister
1952	Montana Belle	Blackjack Bystander (uncredited)
