= Sons of the Pioneers =

American western singing group

- Genres: Country, Western
- Years active: 1933–present
- Labels: Decca, RCA Victor, Vocalion
- Past members: Roy Rogers; Bob Nolan; Tim Spencer; Hugh Farr; Karl Farr; Lloyd Perryman; Pat Brady; Ken Carson; Deuce Spriggens; Shug Fisher; Ken Curtis; Tommy Doss; Roy Lanham; Dale Warren; George Bamby; Rome Johnson; Rusty Richards; Luther Nallie; Dale Morris; Billy Armstrong; Bob Perry; See the Timeline section
- Website: Official website

The Sons of the Pioneers are one of the United States' earliest Western singing groups. Known for their vocal performances, their musicianship, and their songwriting, they produced innovative recordings that have inspired many Western music performers and remained popular through the years. Since 1933, through many changes in membership, the Sons of the Pioneers have remained one of the longest-surviving country music vocal groups.

== Origins ==
In the spring of 1931, Ohio-born Leonard Slye, the cowboy singer who would later change his name to Roy Rogers, arrived in California and found work as a truck driver, and later as a fruit picker for the Del Monte company in California's Central Valley. He entered an amateur singing contest on a Los Angeles radio show called Midnight Frolics and a few days later got an invitation to join a group called the Rocky Mountaineers.

In September 1931, Canadian-born Bob Nolan answered a classified ad in the Los Angeles Herald-Examiner that read, "Yodeler for old-time act, to travel. Tenor preferred." The band was The Rocky Mountaineers, by then led by Leonard Slye. After listening to the tall, slender, tanned Nolan sing and yodel, Slye hired Nolan on the spot. Although Nolan stayed with the group only a short time, he stayed in touch with Slye. Nolan was replaced by Tim Spencer, who had been working in a Safeway Stores warehouse.

In the spring of 1932, Slye, Spencer, and another singer, Slumber Nichols, left the Rocky Mountaineers to form a trio, which soon failed. Throughout most of 1932, Slye and Spencer moved through a series of short-lived groups like the International Cowboys and the O-Bar-O Cowboys. Spencer left the O-Bar-O Cowboys and quit music for a while. Slye joined Jack LeFevre and His Texas Outlaws, who were a popular act on a local Los Angeles radio station.

In early 1933, Slye, Nolan, and Spencer formed a group called the Pioneer Trio. The three young singers rehearsed for weeks honing their singing. While Slye continued to work with his radio singing group, Spencer and Nolan began writing songs for the group.

== Early success ==
By early 1934, the group consisted of Leonard Slye, Bob Nolan, and Tim Spencer on vocals, with Nolan playing string bass and Slye playing rhythm guitar. During that time, fiddle player Hugh Farr joined the group, adding a bass voice to the group's vocal arrangements. He also sang lead on some songs. Later that year, the "Pioneers Trio" became the "Sons of the Pioneers" through a radio station announcer's chance remark. Asked why he'd changed their name, the announcer said they were too young to have been pioneers, but that they could be sons of pioneers. The name was received well and fit the group, who were no longer a trio.

By the summer of 1934, the Sons of the Pioneers' popularity and fame extended beyond the Los Angeles area and quickly spread across the United States through short syndicated radio segments that were rebroadcast all over the country. They signed a recording contract with the newly founded Decca label, and on August 8, 1934, the Sons of the Pioneers made their first commercial recording. That same day, the immensely popular crooner Bing Crosby also made his first Decca session.

One of the first songs recorded by the Sons of the Pioneers during that first August session was written by Bob Nolan, "Tumbling Tumbleweeds", that would soon become a staple in their repertoire. The original title "Tumbling Leaves" was changed to give the song a western character. Over the next two years the group would record 32 songs for Decca. Their output includes a 1937 recording of "The Blue Juniata," by Marion Dix Sullivan.

== Motion pictures ==
Between 1935 and 1984, the Sons of the Pioneers appeared in 87 films, several short films, and a television series. In 1935 they signed with Columbia Pictures to supply the music for the studio's Charles Starrett westerns. In 1937, Leonard Slye was offered a contract as an actor with rival Republic Pictures. Part of that deal required him to leave the singing group. Leonard Slye was rechristened Roy Rogers, and went on to achieve major success as a singing cowboy in the movies. Roy Rogers and the Sons of the Pioneers remained close throughout the coming years. When the Starrett unit disbanded temporarily at the end of the 1941 season, the Pioneers rejoined Rogers at Republic and were soon appearing as highly popular supporting players in the Rogers westerns.

By this time the group was billed as "Bob Nolan and the Sons of the Pioneers." Nolan was reluctant to be the "leader" of the group, which had been formed as a co-operative outfit with no formal leader, but he bowed to the demands of show business. Agents, music publishers, and recording companies insisted that co-operative bands needed a name to promote them (as in Glen Gray and the Casa Loma Orchestra). Because Bob Nolan's featured appearances with Starrett had made him the most recognizable of the Pioneers, Nolan reluctantly became the "front" for the group. The group, as "Bob Nolan and the Sons of the Pioneers," made guest appearances in the Warner Bros. all-star revue Hollywood Canteen (1944, singing "Tumbling Tumbleweeds") and the RKO Hollywood-themed comedy Ding Dong Williams (1945, singing "Cool Water").

== Radio ==
The Sons of the Pioneers always valued radio exposure, and appeared often on radio broadcasts. They had three network shows of their own: 10-2-4 Ranch (1941–45, for Dr Pepper), Radio Rodeo (for the Mutual Broadcasting System, 1941–42), and The Lucky U Ranch (1951–53, for Planters Peanuts).

The group also began making transcription records for broadcast in 1934. These were syndicated by Standard Transcriptions (1934–36), Mutual (1939, as The Sunshine Ranch), RCA (1940, as Symphonies of the Sage), the Armed Forces Radio Service (1942–45, as Melody Roundup), and Teleways (1947–49, as The Sons of the Pioneers Show).

The Teleways series was intended as a daily 15-minute show but could be programmed anywhere on a station's schedule, at the station's discretion. The group prepared a demonstration record for radio stations and their potential local sponsors, with announcer Art Gilmore reading promotional copy between songs. The informal, semi-scripted show had Bob Nolan acting as master of ceremonies, bantering with the other singers between numbers. The group was careful to program a variety of choral music, including cowboy songs, barbershop harmony, sentimental ballads, and spirituals, to appeal to the widest possible audience. The personnel were Bob Nolan, Tim Spencer, Lloyd Perryman, Pat Brady, Hugh "Foghorn" Farr, Karl Farr, and Ken Carson. The earliest shows include studio musician Ivan Ditmars accompanying them on piano and organ; Nolan appreciated Ditmars's efforts but preferred that the group's established sound should be preserved for the radio series, so Ditmars was released. Toward the end of the run, in an effort to save both time and money, the later Teleways shows were patched together from previous programs (including some songs with Ditmars), with new spoken dialogue by Nolan and the gang connecting the older performances.

== Changes ==
Republic Pictures president Herbert Yates released the Sons of the Pioneers from their movie contract in 1948, replacing them with a less expensive alternative, Foy Willing's Riders of the Purple Sage. The hurried nature of the Sons of the Pioneers' last radio shows reflected Tim Spencer's and Bob Nolan's anxiousness to move on; both left the group in 1949, after their radio commitments had been fulfilled. Tim Spencer retired from performing with the group, to devote himself to handling the group's business interests; his place in the group was taken by singer Ken Curtis. Bob Nolan was replaced by Tommy Doss, who sounded almost exactly like him. Lloyd Perryman took over Nolan's emcee duties. Nolan returned to the group in 1955 at the insistence of RCA Victor, which valued the group's distinctive sound with Nolan, and refused to record the Sons of the Pioneers unless Nolan was present. Nolan's participation was limited to RCA records through 1958; he no longer appeared with the group. Similarly, Tim Spencer still participated in the RCA recording sessions through 1957. Hugh Farr retired from the group in 1959 and his brother, guitarist Karl Farr, died in 1961. The group continued to record new albums for RCA through the 1960s, the last being a collection of Hawaiian songs, The Sons of the Pioneers Visit the South Seas (1969).

== End of an era ==
In 1971, Bob Nolan and Tim Spencer were both elected to the Nashville Songwriters Hall of Fame. In 1972, most of the surviving members of the Sons of the Pioneers, including the original Pioneer Trio of Roy Rogers, Bob Nolan, and Tim Spencer, gathered at the Ambassador Hotel in Los Angeles for one last performance.

The late 1970s saw the passing of the founding members of the group. Tim Spencer died on April 26, 1976. Lloyd Perryman, who had been with the group since 1936, died on May 31, 1977. Hugh Farr, who had retired from the group in 1958, died on April 17, 1980.

In 1979, Bob Nolan returned to the studio for the final time and recorded a successful solo album of classics and newer compositions titled Bob Nolan – The Sound of a Pioneer. Nolan died on June 16, 1980. That same year, the Sons of the Pioneers were inducted into the Country Music Hall of Fame.

== Sons of the Pioneers today ==
The Sons of the Pioneers have never stopped performing since their inception in 1934. Following the death of Lloyd Perryman in 1977, Dale Warren, who had joined the group in 1952, took over the leadership of the Sons of the Pioneers, guiding them into the 2000s until his death on August 8, 2008. They continued to perform in concert and recorded as well, with a lineup that featured, among many others, Luther Nallie (guitar, vocals), Rusty Richards (vocals), Billy Armstrong (fiddle), Billy Liebert (accordion), Gary LeMaster (lead guitar), Rome Johnson (vocals), and Roy ("Dusty") Rogers Jr. (vocals, MC), the founder's son, who appeared with the group from 2018 until his retirement in 2023.

The current Sons of the Pioneers are "trail boss" John Fullerton (lead vocals, lead guitar), Ken Lattimore (vocals, fiddle, comedy), Trustin Baker (fiddle), Chuck Ervin (bass, vocals), and Trent Prewitt (baritone vocals, rhythm guitar).

== Legacy ==
In addition to their appearances and filmed performances, their music was used in numerous other films and television shows. and for John Ford movies Wagon Master in 1949 and Rio Grande in 1950, and performed the theme song for the John Ford classic The Searchers in 1956.

In 1977, the Smithsonian Institution, which designates certain artists and performers who have made a noteworthy contribution to the arts and culture of America, named the Sons of the Pioneers as "National Treasures".

In 1995, the Sons of the Pioneers were inducted into the Western Performers Hall of Fame at the National Cowboy & Western Heritage Museum in Oklahoma City, Oklahoma.

In 2001, a book about the group was published, titled The Sons of the Pioneers by Bill O'Neal and Fred Goodwin. Another book about the group, first published in 1974, is called Hear My Song, The Story of the Celebrated Sons of the Pioneers by Ken Griffis, and is available on The Pioneers' website.

Later notable appearances include:

- An appearance along with Roy Rogers in January 1983 in season 2, episode 11 of the TV show "The Fall Guy", titled "Happy Trails".
- An appearance on Austin City Limits in season 9, episode 12, titled "Country Legends with Faron Young, Kitty Wells, Sons of the Pioneers, Joe & Rose Maphis, Pee Wee King & Red Stewart, Johnny Wright, & The Collins Sisters". The episode was taped in Austin, TX on March 7, 1984.
- "Tumbling Tumbleweeds" was used in the Coen Brothers film The Big Lebowski in 1998.

The Sons of the Pioneers were the first Country and Western group to sing at Carnegie Hall, and the first to perform at the lavish nightclubs in Las Vegas. The group has a star on the Hollywood Walk of Fame at 6845 Hollywood Blvd. for recording.

Pioneertown, California was named for the Sons of the Pioneers who were original investors. It was built in 1946 as an old west movie set.

The Sons of the Pioneers Transcription Disc Collection resides at the University of North Carolina at Chapel Hill within the Southern Folklife Collection.

== Timeline ==
Since 1934, 42 singers and musicians have been official members of the Sons of the Pioneers.

1. Roy Rogers (as Leonard Slye) (1934–37) lead vocals, rhythm & lead guitar
2. Bob Nolan (1934–49, 1955–58 recordings) baritone vocals, string bass
3. Tim Spencer (1934–36, 1938–49, 1955-57 recordings) tenor and lead vocals, lead & rhythm guitar
4. Hugh Farr (1934–59) bass and lead vocals, fiddle
5. Karl Farr (1935–61) lead/rhythm guitar, harmony
6. Lloyd Perryman (1936–43, 1946–77) tenor and lead vocals, rhythm guitar, 1st Trail Boss
7. Pat Brady (1937–43, 1946–49, 1959–69) string bass, comedy
8. Ken Carson (1943–47) tenor vocals, guitar
9. Deuce Spriggens (1943, 1953–55) string bass, harmony vocals
10. Shug Fisher (1944–46, 1949–53, 1956–59) string bass, harmony vocals, comedy
11. Ken Curtis (1949–53, 1955–57 recordings) lead vocals
12. Tommy Doss (1949–67, 1972) baritone vocals
13. Dale Warren (1952–2008) lead and baritone vocals, string bass/electric bass, 2nd Trail Boss
14. George Bamby (1959–60) accordion
15. Roy Lanham (1961–86) lead guitar, harmony vocals, comedy
16. Wade Ray (1961–62) fiddle, harmony vocals
17. Rusty Richards (1963–66, 1974–84) tenor vocals, rhythm guitar
18. Billy Armstrong (1966–72) lead vocals, fiddle
19. Bob Minser (1967–68) tenor vocals, string bass/electric bass
20. Luther Nallie (1969–74, 1980–2004, 2007–2015) tenor, lead, and baritone vocals, lead/rhythm guitar, electric bass, saxophone, clarinet, 3rd Trail Boss
21. Billy Liebert (1974–80) accordion, arranger
22. Rome Johnson (1977–80) lead vocals, rhythm guitar
23. Doc Denning (1981) fiddle, harmony vocals
24. Dale Morris (1981–83) fiddle, harmony vocals
25. Tommy Nallie (1983–88, 2010–2025) lead and harmony vocals, lead guitar, string bass, drums, 4th Trail Boss
26. Sunny Spencer (1984–2005) lead vocals, multi-instrumentalist, comedy
27. Jack Nallie (1984–86) electric bass
28. Gary LeMaster (1986–2006, 2008–12) tenor and lead vocals, lead guitar, trombone, trumpet, comedy
29. Daryl Wainscott (1987–93) keyboards, harmony vocals
30. David Bradley (1989–94) harmony vocals, rhythm guitar
31. John Nallie (1993–2001) lead vocals, keyboards, drums, electric bass
32. Roy Warhurst (1994–97) fiddle, rhythm guitar, mandolin, comedy
33. Ken Lattimore (1998–present) tenor vocals, fiddle, comedy
34. Randy Rudd (2001–2017) lead vocals, rhythm guitar
35. Preston Eldridge (2001–2006) harmony vocals, string bass, fiddle
36. Ricky Boen (2006–2014) harmony vocals, fiddle
37. Mark Abbott (2006–2017) baritone vocals, string bass, fiddle, comedy
38. Justin Branum (2016–2017) fiddle, harmony vocals
39. Roy "Dusty" Rogers Jr. (2018–2023) lead and baritone vocals
40. John Fullerton (2018–present) lead and baritone vocals, rhythm guitar, 5th Trail Boss
41. Paul Elliott (2018–2025) fiddle, harmony vocals
42. Chuck Ervin (2019–present) bass, harmony vocals
43. Trent Prewitt (2025-present) baritone vocals, rhythm guitar
44. Trustin Baker (2026-present) fiddle

== Honors and awards ==
- 1971 Western Heritage Wrangler Award from the National Cowboy Hall of Fame
- 1976 Gene Autry Award
- 1976 Hollywood Walk of Fame Award
- 1977 Smithsonian Institution's "National Treasure" Designation
- 1978 Pioneer Award from Academy of Country Music
- 1980 Country Music Hall of Fame as the Original Sons of the Pioneers (Roy Rogers, Bob Nolan, Tim Spencer, Hugh Farr, Karl Farr, Lloyd Perryman)
- 1984 New Brunswick Country Music Hall of Fame Award
- 1986 Grammy Award for "Cool Water"
- 1988 Texas Western Swing Hall of Fame
- 1994 Western Music Association Hall of Fame Award
- 2002 Grammy Award for "Tumbling Tumbleweeds"
- 2003 Golden Boot Award by Motion Picture and Television Fund

== Selected discography ==
=== Albums ===
LP 10"

- Cowboy Classics (1952)
- Cowboy Hymns and Spirituals (1952)
- Western Classics (1953)

LP 12"

- 25 Favorite Cowboy Songs (1955)
- How Great Thou Art (1957)
- One Man's Songs (1957)
- This Was the West (Disneyland, 1958) – Stan Jones and the Sons of the Pioneers as The Ranger Chorus
- Wagons West (RCA Camden, 1958)
- Cool Water (RCA Victor, 1960)
- Room Full of Roses (RCA Camden, 1960)
- Westward Ho! (1961)
- Lure of the West (1961)
- Tumbleweed Trail (RCA Victor, 1962)
- Good Old Country Music (RCA Camden, 1962)
- Our Men Out West (1963)
- The Sons of the Pioneers Sing Hymns of the Cowboy (1963)
- Trail Dust (1963)
- Country Fare (1964)
- Tumbleweed Trails (Vocalion, 1964)
- Sons of the Pioneers Best (1964)
- Down Memory Trail (1964)
- Legends of the West (1965)
- The Best of the Sons of the Pioneers (1966)
- The Songs of Bob Nolan (1966)
- Campfire Favorites (1967)
- South of the Border (1968)
- San Antonio Rose (RCA Camden, 1968)
- San Antonio Rose (Delta Records, 1968)
- The Sons of the Pioneers Visit the South Seas (1969)
- Riders in the Sky (RCA Camden, 1973)
- Western Country (Granite, Attic, Telefunken, 1976)
- A Country-Western Songbook (RCA, 1977)
- The Sons of the Pioneers (RCA Special Products, 1977)
- Tumbleweed Trails (MCA, 1980)
- Let's Go West Again (1981)
- Celebration Vol. 1 (Silver Spur, 1982)
- Columbia Historic Edition (Columbia, 1982)
- Twenty of the Best (1985)
- Tumbling Tumbleweeds (MCA, 1986)
- Good Old Country Music (RCA Camden, 1986)
- Cool Water – Edition 1 1945–46 (Bear Family, 1987)
- Teardrops in My Heart – Edition 2 1946–47 (Bear Family, 1987)
- A Hundred and Sixty Acres – Edition 3 1947 (Bear Family, 1987)
- Riders in the Sky – Edition 4 1947–49 (Bear Family, 1987)
- Land Beyond the Sun – Edition 5 1949–50 (Bear Family, 1987)
- And Friends – Edition 6 1950–51 (Bear Family, 1987)
- There's a Goldmine in the Sky – Edition 7 1951–52 (Bear Family, 1987)
- Tumbling Tumbleweeds (Universal Special Products, 1987)
- Collection, Vol. 1 (Bear Family, 1987)
- Collection, Vol. 2 (Bear Family, 1987)
- Collection, Vol. 3 (Bear Family, 1987)
- Collection, Vol. 4 (Bear Family, 1987)
- Tumbling Tumbleweeds (RCA, 1989)
- Sunset on the Range (Pair, 1990)
- Empty Saddles (1990)
- Country & Western Memories (Pair, 1991)
- Country Music Hall of Fame (MCA, 1991)
- Songs of the Trail (Pair, 1991)
- San Antonio Rose and Other Country Favorites (RCA/Camden, 1996)
- Our Best to You (1999)
- Tumbling Tumbleweeds (Country Stars, 1999)
- Teleways Transcriptions (Soundies, 1999)
- Symphonies of the Sage (Bloodshot, 2001)
- The Essential Collection (South Side Phunk, 2002)
- Memories of the Lucky U Ranch (Jasmine, 2002)
- Cigarettes, Whiskey...And Cool, Cool Water (ASV, 2002)
- The Sons of the Pioneers: Ultimate Collection (Hip-O, 2002)
- The Essential Collection (Varèse Sarabande, 2003)
- RCA Country Legends (Sony Music Entertainment, 2004)
- Classic Western Harmony, Vol. 2 (2005)
- Under Western Skies (Varèse Sarabande, 2005)
- My Saddle Pals and I (Proper, 2005)
- Classic Cowboy Songs (Varèse Sarabande, 2006)
- The Republic Years (Varèse Sarabande, 2006)
- Western Hymns and Spirituals (Varèse Sarabande, 2008)
- Way Out There: The Complete Recordings 1934–1943 (Bear Family, 2009)
- Cigarettes, Whiskey...And Cool, Cool Water (USD, 2010)
- Sing the Stephen Foster Songbook (Varèse Sarabande, 2010)

=== Singles ===
Year	Single	Chart Positions		
Year	Single	US Country	US	CAN Country
1934	"Tumbling Tumbleweeds"	—	13	—
1941	"Cool Water"	—	25	—
1942	"He's Gone Up the Trail"	—	—	—
1945	"Stars and Stripes on Iwo Jima"	4	—	—
1946	"No One to Cry To"	6	—	—
1947	"Baby Doll"	5	—	—
1947	"Cool Water"	4	—	—
1947	"Cigarettes, Whiskey, and Wild, Wild Women"	5	—	—
1947	"Teardrops in My Heart"	4	—	—
1948	"Blue Shadows on the Trail" (with Roy Rogers)	6	—	—
1948	"(There'll Never Be Another) Pecos Bill" (with Roy Rogers)	13	—	—
1948	"Tumbling Tumbleweeds"	11	—	—
1948	"Cool Water"	7	—	—
1949	"My Best to You"	12	—	—
1949	"Room Full of Roses"	10	26	—
1952	"I Told Them All About You/Ho-Le-O"	—	—	—
1955	"The Ballad Of Davy Crocket"	—	—	—
1957	High Ridin' Woman (from Samuel Fuller's Forty Guns) "	—	—	—
1976	"Cool Water"	—	—	34
1980	"Ride Concrete Cowboy, Ride" (with Roy Rogers)	80	—	—

== Filmography ==
- Slightly Static (1935), short
- Way Up Thar (1935), short
- Gallant Defender (1935)
- The Mysterious Avenger (1936)
- Song of the Saddle (1936)
- Rhythm on the Range (1936)
- California Mail (1936)
- The Big Show (1936)
- The Old Corral (1936)
- The Old Wyoming Trail (1937)
- Outlaws of the Prairie (1937)
- Cattle Raiders (1938)
- Call of the Rockies (1938)
- Law of the Plains (1938)
- West of Cheyenne (1938)
- South of Arizona (1938)
- The Colorado Trail (1938)
- West of the Santa Fe (1938)
- Rio Grande (1938)
- Songs of the West (1939), short
- Texas Stampede (1939)
- North of the Yukon (1939)
- Spoilers of the Range (1939)
- Western Caravans (1939)
- The Man from Sundown (1939)
- Riders of Black River (1939)
- Outpost of the Mounties (1939)
- The Stranger from Texas (1939)
- Two-Fisted Rangers (1939)
- Bullets for Rustlers (1940)
- Blazing Six Shooters (1940)
- Texas Stagecoach (1940)
- The Durango Kid (1940)
- West of Abilene (1940)
- Thundering Frontier (1940)
- The Pinto Kid (1941)
- Outlaws of the Panhandle (1941)
- Red River Valley (1941)
- Man from Cheyenne (1942)
- South of Santa Fe (1942)
- Sunset on the Desert (1942)
- Romance on the Range (1942)
- Sons of the Pioneers (1942)
- Call of the Canyon (1942)
- Sunset Serenade (1942)
- Heart of the Golden West (1942)
- Ridin' Down the Canyon (1942)
- Idaho (1943)
- Song of Texas (1943)
- Silver Spurs (1943)
- The Man from Music Mountain (1943)
- Hands Across the Border (1944)
- Cowboy and the Senorita (1944)
- The Yellow Rose of Texas (1944)
- Song of Nevada (1944)
- San Fernando Valley (1944)
- Lights of Old Santa Fe (1944)
- Hollywood Canteen (1944)
- Utah (1945)
- Bells of Rosarita (1945)
- Man from Oklahoma (1945)
- Along the Navajo Trail (1945)
- Sunset in El Dorado (1945)
- Don't Fence Me In (1945)
- Song of Arizona (1946)
- Ding Dong Williams (1946)
- Home on the Range (1946)
- Rainbow Over Texas (1946)
- My Pal Trigger (1946)
- Under Nevada Skies (1946)
- Roll on Texas Moon (1946)
- Home in Oklahoma (1946)
- Heldorado (1946)
- Apache Rose (1947)
- Hit Parade of 1947 (1947)
- Bells of San Angelo (1947)
- Springtime in the Sierras (1947)
- On the Old Spanish Trail (1947)
- The Gay Ranchero (1948)
- Unusual Occupations (1948), short
- Under California Stars (1948)
- Melody Time (1948)
- Eyes of Texas (1948)
- Night Time in Nevada (1948)
- My Pal Trigger (1949)
- Everybody's Dancin (1950)
- Wagon Master (1950)
- Rio Grande (film) (1950)
- Fighting Coast Guard (1951)
