= George Meehan =

American cinematographer (1891–1947)

George Benjamin Meehan Jr.
- Born: July 19, 1891; Brooklyn, New York, U.S.
- Died: February 10, 1947 (aged 55); Hollywood, California, U.S.
- Occupation: Cinematographer
- Notable work: Ben Hur (1925); The Ghost Talks (1929); Back to the Woods (1937); Tarzan's Revenge (1938); Bullets for Bandits (1942)

George Benjamin Meehan Jr. (1891–1947) was the cinematographer of more than 165 American films, including film shorts by The Three Stooges and eight Wild Bill Elliott westerns.

== Life and career ==
Meehan was born on July 19, 1891, in Brooklyn, New York. During World War I, Meeham was a cinematographer in the United States Army. Meehan later worked as a cinematographer on 166 or 167 American movies, some of which became famous.

In 1944, George Meehan was the mentor of Richard H. Kline. In 1947, when Meehan was working on King of the Wild Horses, he became ill and was replaced on the project by Philip Tannura.

== Personal and death ==
Meehan married Louise Harriett Mahoney. Their only son died in World War II. Meehan died on February 10, 1947, and was buried in the Forest Lawn Memorial Park of Glendale, California.

== Filmography ==
- Mary of the Movies (1923)
- Battling Buddy (1924)
- Ben Hur: A Tale of the Christ (Cameraman, 1925)
- The Great Sensation (1925)
- The New Champion (1925)
- Fighting Youth (1925)
- Speed Mad (1925)
- The Ghost Talks (1929)
- The Big Chance (1933)
- Ship of Wanted Men (1933)
- Inside Information (1934)
- Code of the Range (1936)
- Back to the Woods (1937)
- Manhattan Shakedown (1937)
- Two Gun Law (1937)
- Tarzan’s Revenge (1938)
- Riders of Black River (1939)
- The Taming of the West (1939)
- Beyond the Sacramento (1940)
- The Return of Wild Bill (1940)
- The Wildcat of Tucson (1940)
- Bullets for Bandits (1942)
- Pardon My Gun (1942)
- The Devil's Trail (1942)
- Voice of the Whistler (1945)
- Terror Trail (1946)
