= Gower Street =

Gower Street may refer to:

- Gower Street, London
- Gower Street (Los Angeles)
