= Montecito Apartments =

- U.S. National Register of Historic Places
- Los Angeles Historic-Cultural Monument
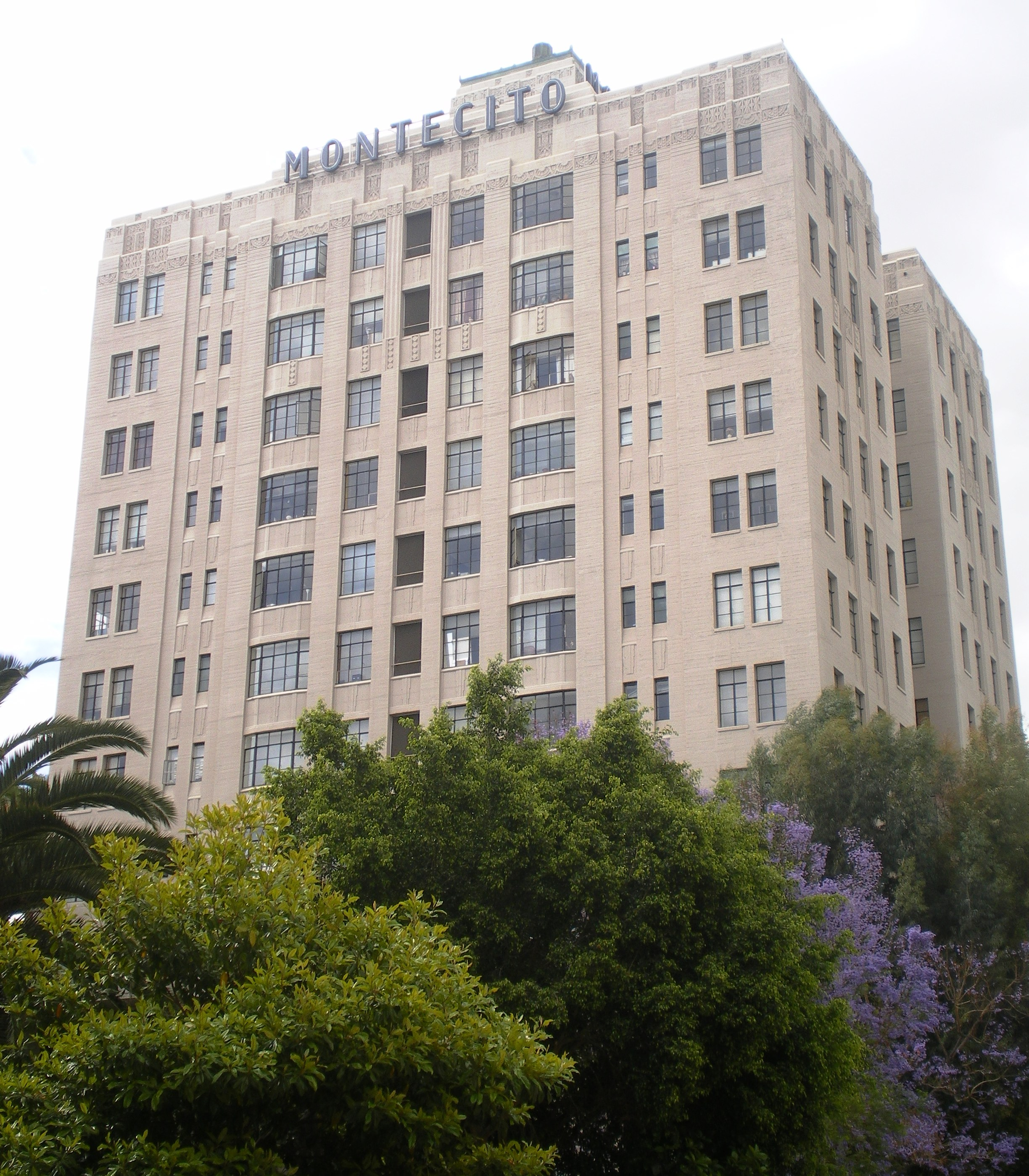
- The building in 2008
- Location: 6650-6668 West Franklin Avenue and 1855 North Cherokee, Hollywood, Los Angeles, California, US
- Coordinates: 34°6′18″N 118°20′3″W
- Built: 1930
- Architects: Herbert M. Baruch Corporation; Marcus P. Miller
- Architectural style: Art Deco
- NRHP reference No.: 85001592
- LAHCM No.: 1169

Significant dates
- Added to NRHP: July 18, 1985
- Designated LAHCM: November 21, 2018

Montecito Apartments, also known as The Montecito, is a historic apartment building located at 6650-6668 West Franklin Avenue and 1855 North Cherokee in Hollywood, California, United States. It was built in 1935 in the Art Deco style and was home to many Hollywood celebrities, including James Cagney, Mickey Rooney, Percy Kilbride, and Montgomery Clift. It was also Ronald Reagan’s first home when he moved to Hollywood in 1937. In 1985, the building was converted to low-income senior housing.

== History ==
Montecito Apartments designed by Marcus P. Miller and built for $1 million in 1935 ($23.5 million in 2025). In 1946, it was sold for $600,000 ($9.91 million in 2025). It was sold again in 1954, this time by Isadore and Libby Teacher to Howard Fox and Harry Wyatt.

In 1970, rent for furnished apartments in the building ranged from $180 to $400 ($1492 to $3316 in 2025). In 1984, the building owners rehabilitated the building and converted it into 180 apartments for low income senior citizens. In 1988, the Los Angeles Conservancy awarded the Montecito for the redevelopment project.

In 1985, Montecito Apartments was listed in the National Register of Historic Places. The building is significant for its design, architectural quality, integrity, and as the finest extant work of architect Marcus P. Miller. The building was declared Los Angeles Historic-Cultural Monument No. 1169 on November 21, 2018.

In 1995, the owners defaulted on loans, resulting in Bank of America foreclosing on the building. The foreclosure triggered losses of $8.2 million ($17.3 million in 2025).

== Architecture and design ==
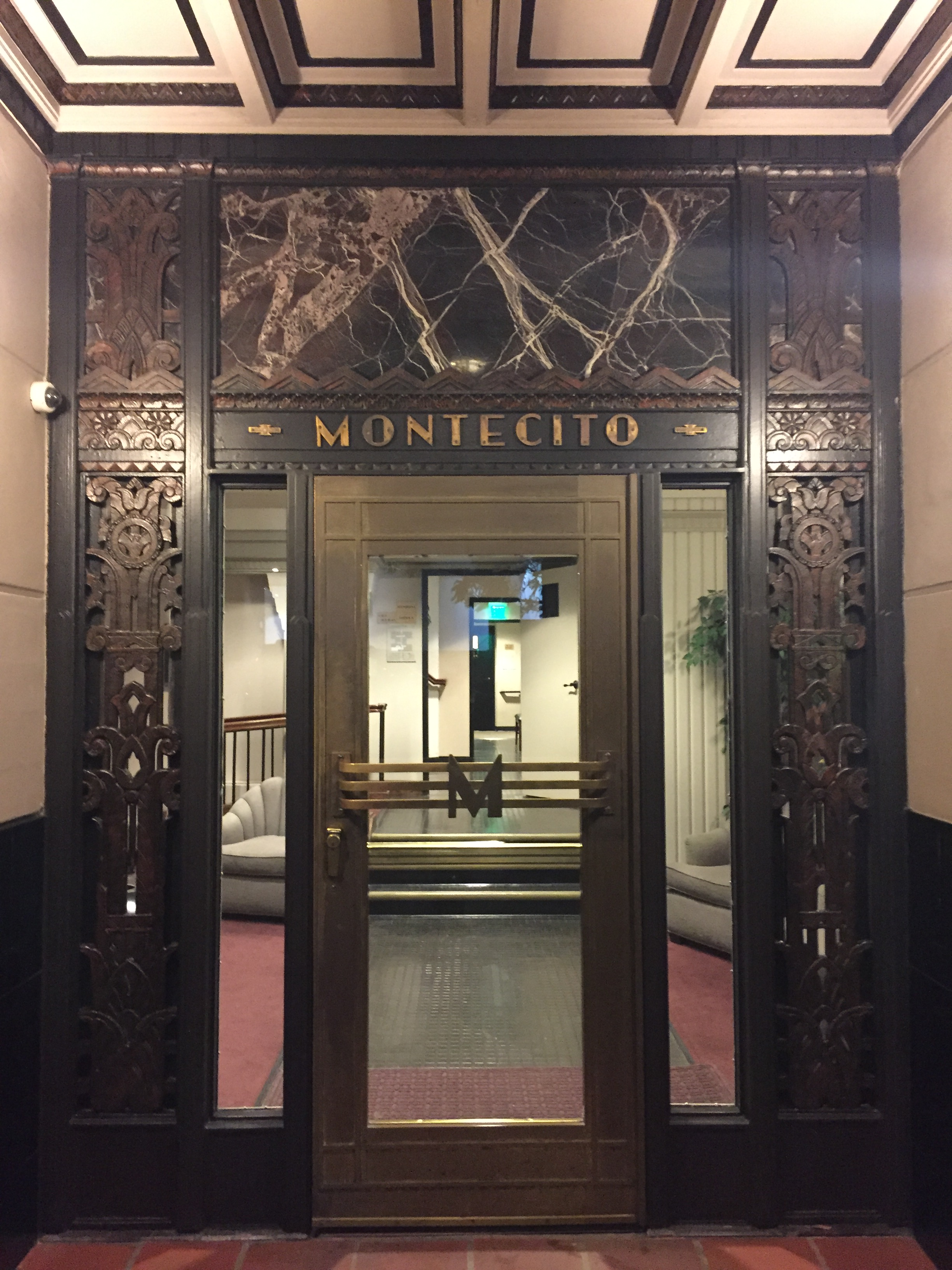
The building's front doors

Montecito Apartments is the highest building in Hollywood and is set on a hill overlooking the city. The building features an Art Deco design with Mayan influences and windows arranged in vertical blinds. The National Park Service describes the building as “one of the finest examples of the Art Deco style, with Mayan influence detailing.”

The building originally contained with 95 units but these were later renovated into 180 units. The property also contains a swimming pool, two subterranean garages, and a parking lot.

== Tenants ==
Montecito Apartments was home to numerous future movie stars. The building was Ronald Reagan’s first residence after he moved to Hollywood; Reagan lived here from June 1937 to late 1938 and was reportedly roommates with Mickey Rooney. Other celebrities who lived in this building include James Cagney, George C. Scott, Montgomery Clift, Geraldine Page, Don Johnson, Sal Mineo, and Ben Vereen.

== In popular culture ==
The Montecito was the subject of a two-part TV Guide profile, written by Richard Gehman, that referenced many of its familiar character actor residents.

== See also ==
- List of Registered Historic Places in Los Angeles
- List of Los Angeles Historic-Cultural Monuments in Hollywood
