= Franklin Avenue (Los Angeles) =

Street in Los Angeles, California, United States

Coordinates: 34.1054°N 118.3042°W

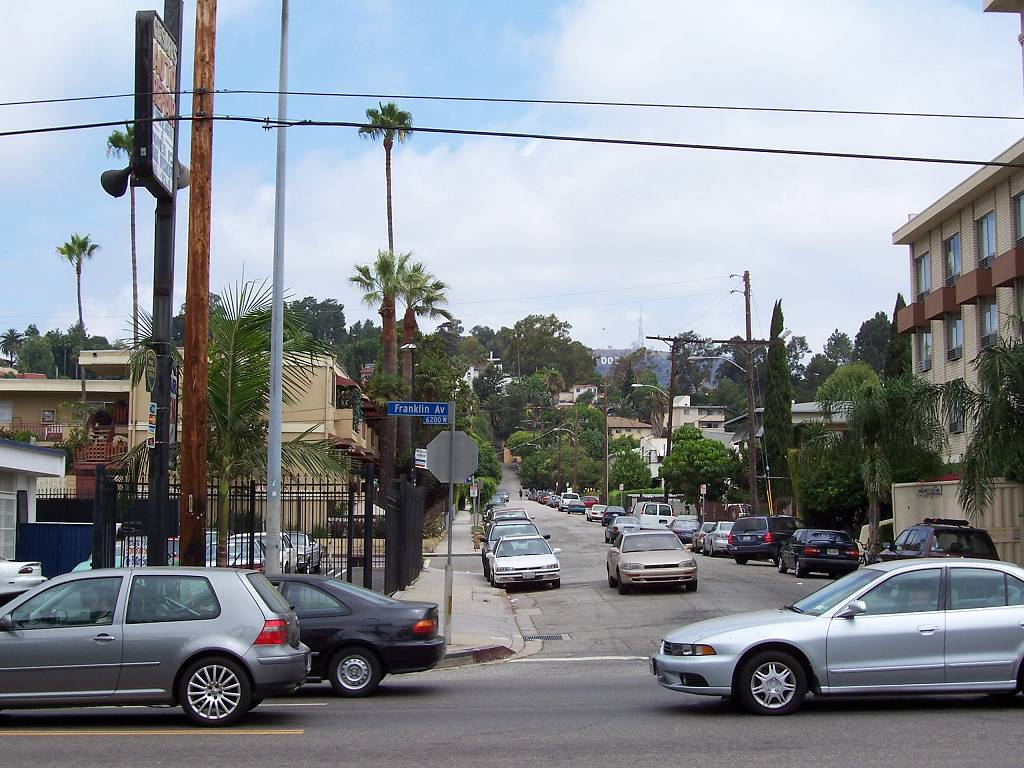
- View along Franklin Avenue, Los Angeles, California
- Interactive map of Franklin Avenue
- Maintained by: Bureau of Street Services, Los Angeles Department of Water and Power
- Length: 5 miles (8.0 km)
- Location: Los Angeles, California
- West end: Sierra Bonita Avenue in Whitley Heights
- Major junctions: Highland Avenue in Hollywood; US 101/Vine Street in Hollywood; Western Avenue in Los Feliz; Vermont Avenue in Los Feliz
- East end: Clayton Avenue/Ronda Vista Drive in Los Feliz

Franklin Avenue is a street in Los Angeles. It is the northernmost thoroughfare in Hollywood and the southern border of the Hollywood Hills. It is the center of the neighborhood of Franklin Village.

== Route ==
From west to east, Franklin Avenue begins as a residential street at Sierra Bonita Avenue. Heading east, Franklin is the southern border of Whitley Heights, then becomes a major east–west thoroughfare at the base of the Hollywood Hills. It connects with Highland Avenue, then the Hollywood Freeway near Vine Street; it then continues across Western Avenue, Vermont Avenue, and the Shakespeare Bridge to its eastern terminus is at Clayton Avenue/Ronda Vista Drive in Los Feliz.

== Landmarks ==
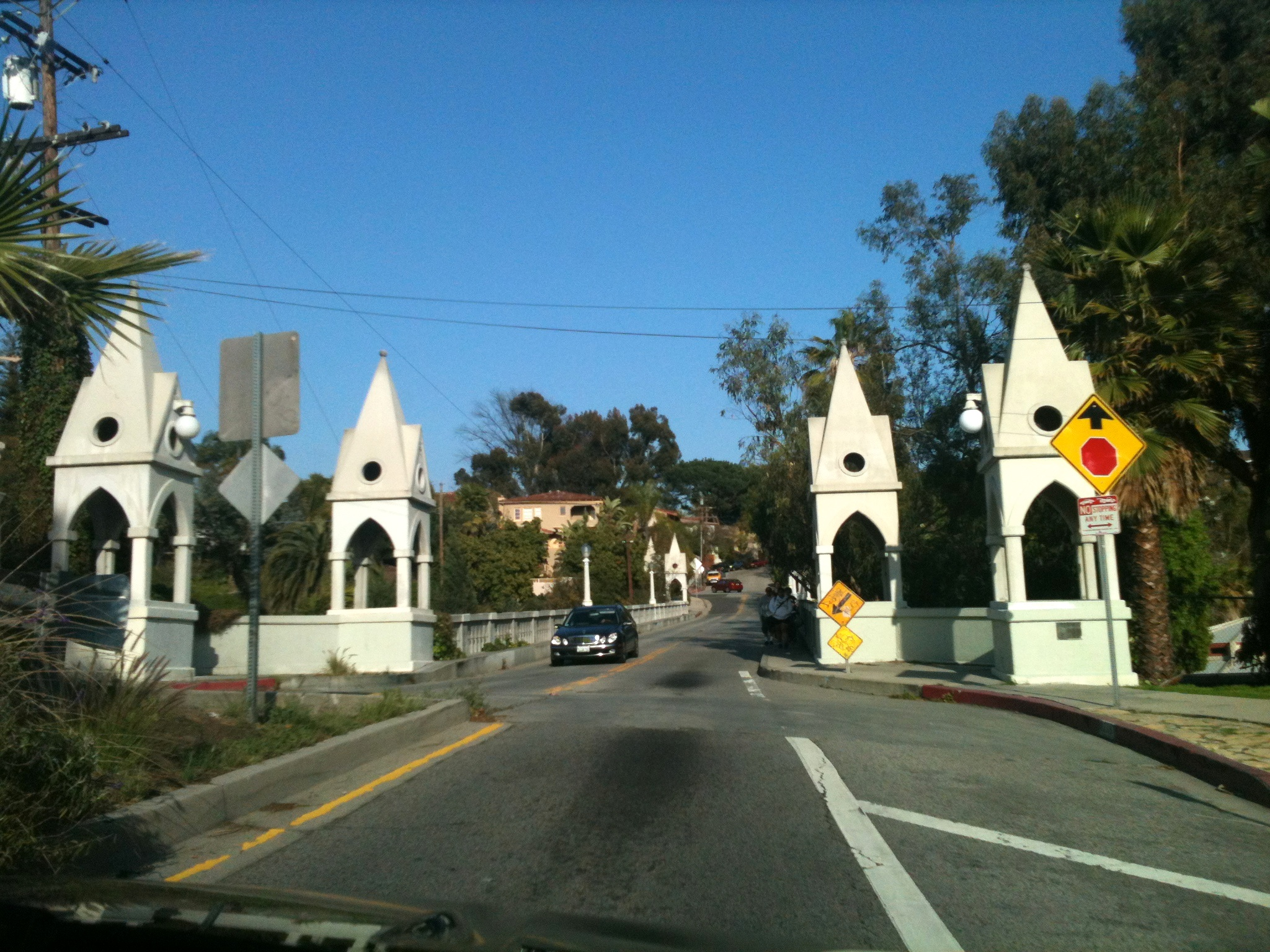
Shakespeare Bridge

Several Los Angeles Historic-Cultural Monuments are located on Franklin: Magic Castle, Shakespeare Bridge, Franklin Garden Apartments, First United Methodist Church of Hollywood, Villa Carlotta, Chateau Elysee (now the Church of Scientology Celebrity Centre), Sowden House, Chateau des Fleurs, The Montecito, and Sister Mary Corita Studio (now Immaculate Heart High School). Additionally, the first house in the Hollywood area, built by Tomás Urquidez in 1854, was located at the intersection of what would become Franklin and Outpost Drive.

National Register of Historic Places-listed Hollywood Tower, often cited as the inspiration for the Twilight Zone Tower of Terror attractions at several Walt Disney Parks and Resorts, is located on Franklin west of Gower Street, an intersection that has also been cited as one of the better places to view the Hollywood Sign.

Upright Citizens Brigade Theatre is located on Franklin near Bronson Avenue.
