= Blackjack Ward =

American actor (1891–1954)

Jerome Bonaparte "Blackjack" Ward was an American cowboy and Western actor who appeared in over 160 films from 1927 to 1946.

== Professional career ==
Ward was born in Franklin, Louisiana on May 3, 1891, but found his way to Hollywood during the height of the making of the black and white westerns appearing in over 160 such films as mostly an uncredited bit and background actor. He was credited in The Ghost Rider (1935) as "Henchman Chalky", in Texas Stampede (1939) as "Ave Avery", in Rainbow Riders (1934) as "Texarkana Pete a.k.a. The Candy Kid", and in Lighting Bill (1934) as "Red - Ranchhand". He appeared in 42 films during the years of 1931 and 1932 alone.

== Homicide allegations ==
In February 1940, Ward became involved in a homicide on Sunset Boulevard at Gower Gulch, near Columbia Pictures studios when he shot and killed stuntman and background actor Johnny Tyke. This event occurred after an altercation in which Ward claimed that Tyke had been threatening him for months after getting out of prison. According to Ward, he had run into Tyke at the corner drugstore and Tyke started to call him names and threatening to beat him to death. Ward walked away to get his gun in his car but Tyke was standing nearby the car, so Ward shot through the windshield. As Tyke ran across the parking lot to escape, Ward ran after him and shot him. Police reported that they caught Ward two blocks away attempting to escape, and when cornered, Ward fanned the hammer on his sixshooter guns. Members of the movie industry publicly supported Ward during the trial. On July 18, 1940, the Los Angeles District Attorney found that Ward had fired in self-defense and dismissed the charges.

In December 1941, Ward was drinking at the Roundup Cafe at Gower Gulch and pulled a gun on Henry Isabelle. In court, Isabelle testified Ward had called him names and picked a fight with him.

== Death ==
Ward died in Los Angeles, California on April 29, 1954, aged 62.
