= Texas Stampede =

1939 film

- Directed by: Sam Nelson
- Written by: Forrest Sheldon; Charles F. Royal
- Produced by: Harry L. Decker
- Starring: Charles Starrett; Iris Meredith; Bob Nolan
- Cinematography: Lucien Ballard
- Edited by: William A. Lyon
- Music by: Morris Stoloff
- Production company: Columbia Pictures
- Distributed by: Columbia Pictures
- Release date: February 9, 1939
- Running time: 57 minutes
- Country: United States
- Language: English

Texas Stampede is a 1939 American western film directed by Sam Nelson and starring Charles Starrett, Iris Meredith and Bob Nolan. It is a remake of the 1930 film The Dawn Trail

== Cast ==
- Charles Starrett as Tom Randall
- Iris Meredith as Joan Cameron
- Fred Kohler Jr. as Wayne Cameron
- Bob Nolan as Bob
- Lee Prather as Jeff Cameron
- Ray Bennett as Zack Avery
- Blackjack Ward Abe Avery
- Hank Bell as Hank
- Edmund Cobb as Hobbs
- Edward Coxen as Seth
- Edward Hearn as Owens
- Sons of the Pioneers as Ranch Hands / Musicians

== Bibliography ==
- Pitts, Michael R. Western Movies: A Guide to 5,105 Feature Films. McFarland, 2012.
