= Gower Gulch =

Intersection in Los Angeles, California

Coordinates: 34.098°N 118.322°W

Gower Gulch is a nickname for the intersection of Sunset Boulevard and Gower Street in Hollywood, Los Angeles, California.

== History ==
Advertisement for the Gower tract, 1905

Since the days of silent film, the surrounding area had contained several movie studios, including the Christie Studios (on the northwest corner) during the 1920s, then later, Columbia and Republic Studios to the south along Gower Street.

Western films at both studios were extremely popular, especially from the 1930s through the 1950s, and actual working cowboys would come to Hollywood hoping to find work in the movies. They would congregate at that particular street corner, which is how it acquired its nickname. The Columbia Drug Store, which stood on the southeast corner for several decades, was a hangout for many Western film extras in hopes of finding work, knowing the casting agents from the studio could reach them there.

In February 1940, actor Blackjack Ward became involved in a homicide on Sunset Boulevard at Gower Gulch, near Columbia Pictures studios, when he shot and killed stuntman and background actor Johnny Tyke.

A strip mall, Gower Gulch Plaza, "paying homage to the past" and designed in the style of an Old West backlot, was built in 1976 on the southwest corner of Sunset and Gower. The name "Gower Gulch" is painted on the side of a vintage Western medicine show wagon. The strip mall remains unchanged as of 2024 and has been described as "Old West kitsch".

== In pop culture ==
- In the Warner Bros. 1943 movie Thank Your Lucky Stars, Gower Gulch is a hilltop neighborhood in Los Angeles, where struggling actors and musicians live in caravans and cottages cobbled together from movie sets and gathered around an old house. It is located "only 4 minutes from Vine Street", according to one of the characters. The Hollywoodland sign blinks in the background on its distant hill.
- A B-movie was released in 1950 called The Kid from Gower Gulch starring Spade Cooley. In the film, singer Red Murrell sings a song called "Gower Gulch is Home Sweet Home".
- The November 13, 1948, episode of the CBS West Coast radio detective series Jeff Regan, Investigator is entitled "The Guy from Gower Gulch"; its plot revolves around a missing South American racehorse and its connections to a travelogue.
- The name Gower Gulch also appears in the Warner Bros. 1950 cartoon All a Bir-r-r-d. It is the name of a Western-looking town Tweety's train passes through.
- In another Warner Bros. 1951 cartoon, Drip-Along Daffy, Porky Pig sings a Michael Maltese-written song entitled "The Flower of Gower Gulch". Another version of the song is performed in the Warner Bros. animated short Nelly's Folly.
- In the 1942 Abbott and Costello film Ride 'Em Cowboy, a bus depot is identified as Gower Gulch by a hanging sign.
- In the biopic Mank, Gower Gulch is referenced at 34' 07" in the MGM offices.
