= Hollywood, Los Angeles =

Neighborhood in Los Angeles, California, US

Hollywood
- Neighborhood
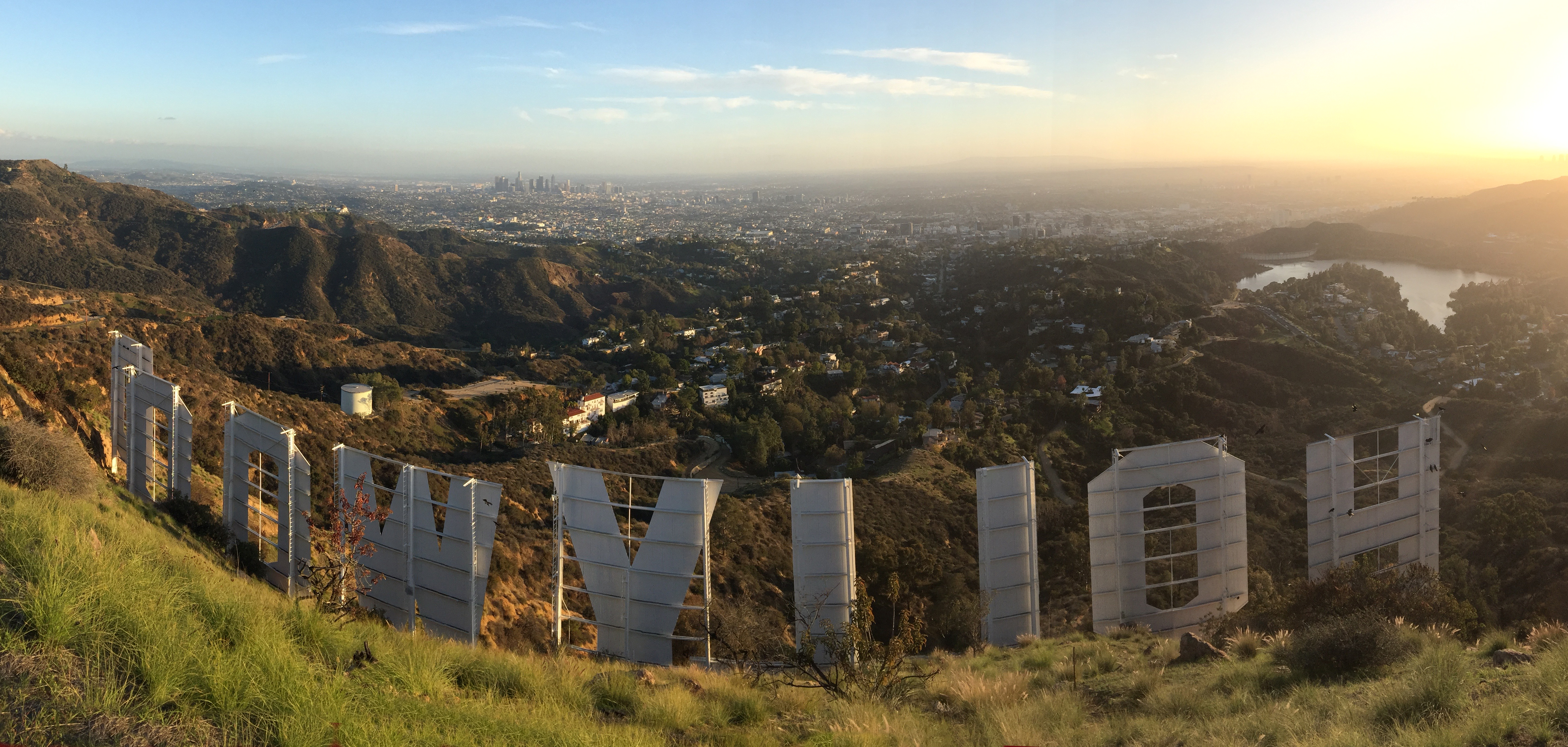
- The Hollywood Sign in front of Hollywood Hills in January 2019

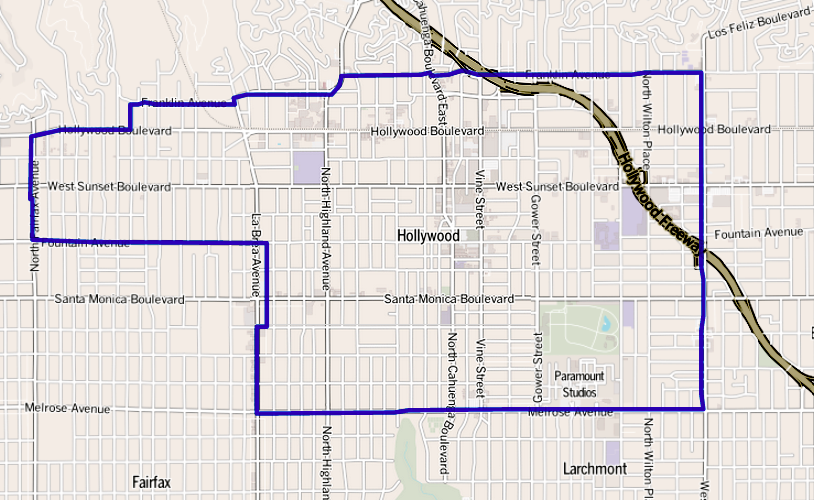
- Map of the Hollywood neighborhood of Los Angeles

- Location of Hollywood in Los Angeles
- Coordinates: 34°06′06″N 118°19′36″W
- Country: United States
- State: California
- County: Los Angeles
- City: Los Angeles
- Incorporated: 1903; 123 years ago
- Merged with Los Angeles: 1910; 116 years ago
- Named for: Hollywood, an estate in present day Brookfield, Illinois
- Elevation: 354 ft (108 m)

Population (2020)
  - Total: 73,747
- Area code: 323

Hollywood, sometimes informally called Tinseltown, is a neighborhood in Central Los Angeles, California. Its name has become synonymous with the American film industry and the people associated with it. Despite this association, most major film studios are located outside the neighborhood, although Paramount Pictures maintains a studio lot within it.

Hollywood was incorporated as an independent municipality on November 9, 1903. The municipality was consolidated with the City of Los Angeles on February 7, 1910 following a referendum.

== History ==
=== Initial development ===
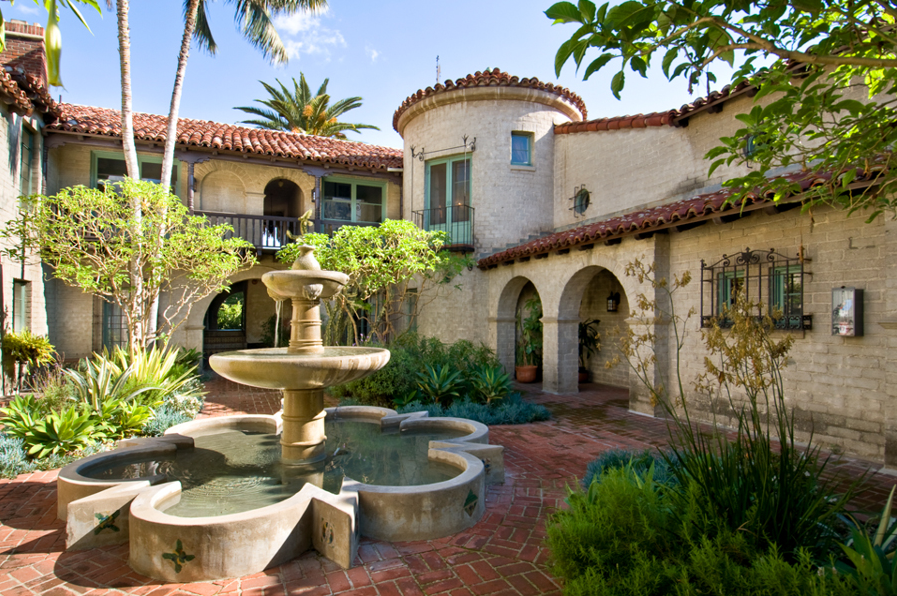
El Cabrillo, a historical Spanish Colonial Revival landmark built in 1928 by Cecil B. DeMille

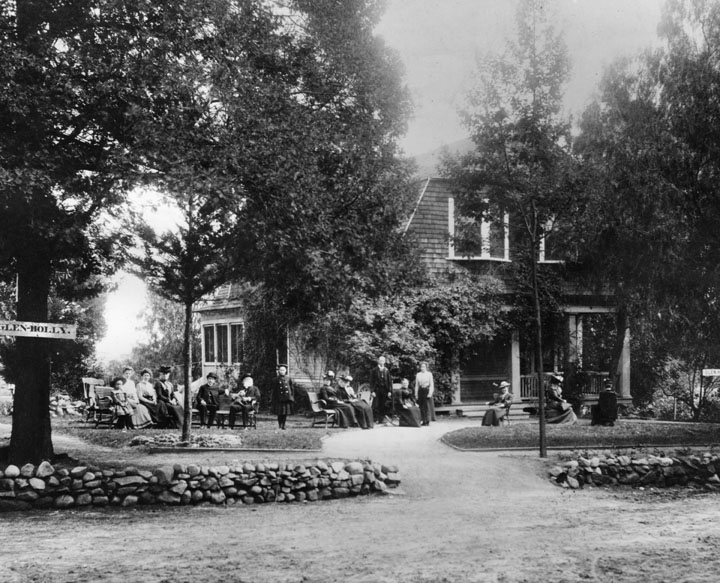
Glen-Holly Hotel, Hollywood's second hotel, at the corner of what is now Yucca Street, was built in the 1890s.

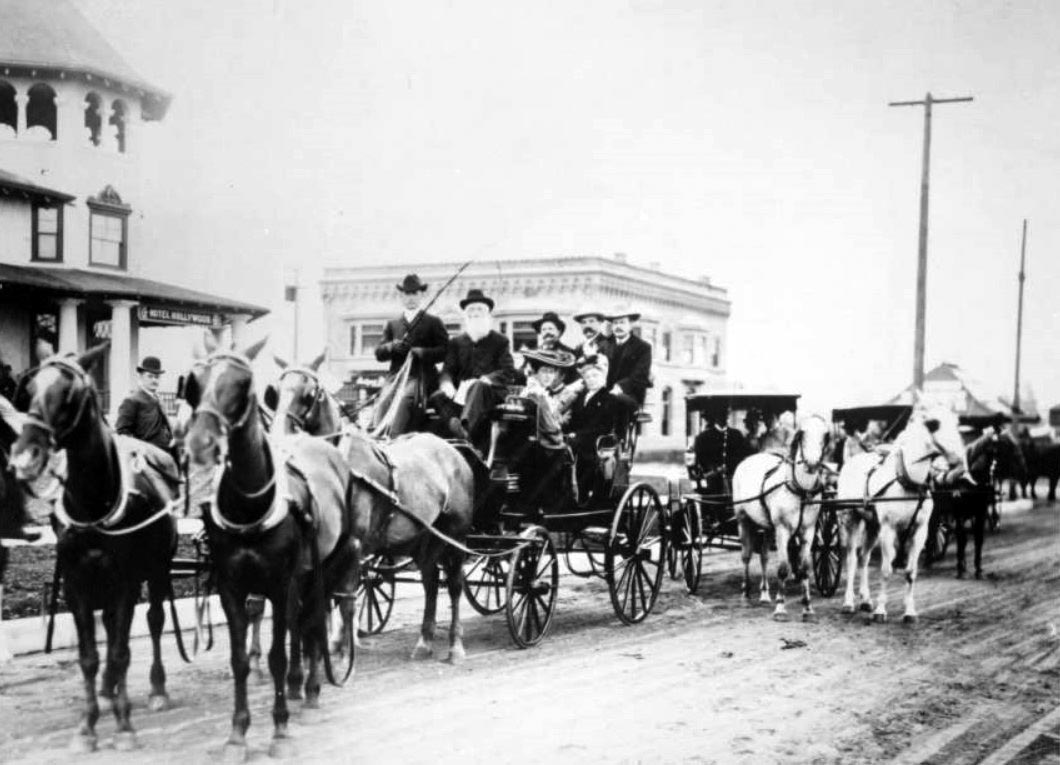
H. J. Whitley (on left wearing a bowler hat) and the Hollywood Hotel (on left) at the corner of Highland Avenue and Hollywood Boulevard

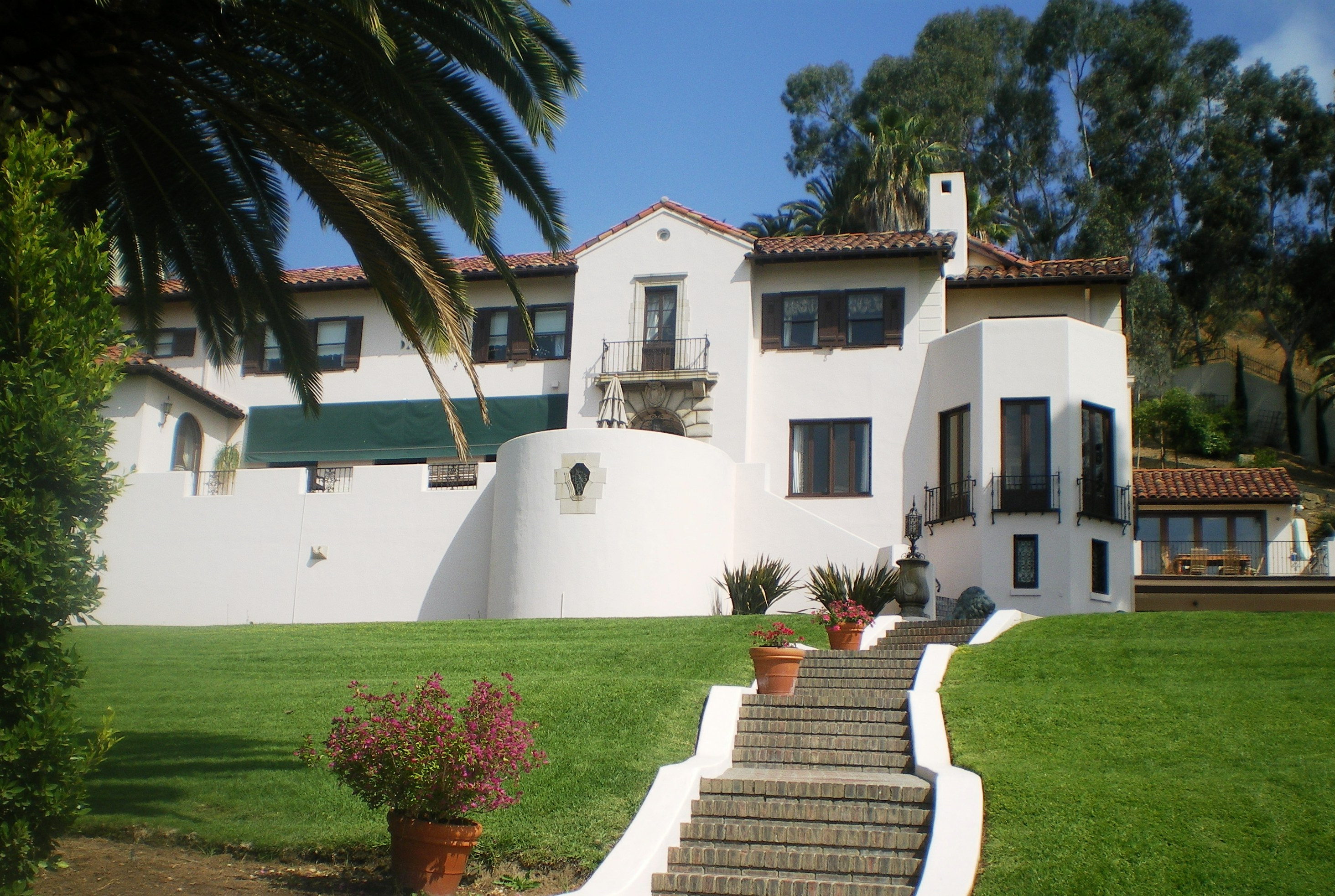
Villa Las Colinas, a historic Mission Revival estate built by Charles E. Toberman in 1922

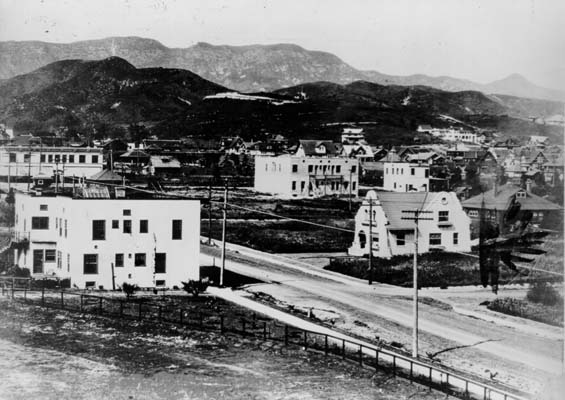
The intersection of Hollywood and Highland in 1907

H. J. Whitley, a real estate developer, arranged to buy the 480-acre (1.9 km^{2}) E.C. Hurd ranch. Whitley shared his plans for the new town with General Harrison Gray Otis, publisher of the Los Angeles Times, and Ivar Weid, a prominent businessman in the area.

Daeida Wilcox, who donated land to help in the development of Hollywood, learned of the name Hollywood from an acquaintance who owned an estate by that name in Illinois. Wilcox is quoted as saying, "I chose the name Hollywood simply because it sounds nice and because I'm superstitious and holly brings good luck." She recommended the same name to her husband, Harvey H. Wilcox, who had purchased 120 acres on February 1, 1887. It was not until August 1887 that Wilcox decided to use that name and filed with the Los Angeles County Recorder's office on a deed and parcel map of the property.

By 1900, the region had a post office, newspaper, hotel, and two markets. Los Angeles, with a population of 102,479, lay 10 miles (16 km) east through the vineyards, barley fields, and citrus groves. A single-track streetcar line ran down the middle of Prospect Avenue from it, but service was infrequent and the trip took two hours. The old citrus fruit-packing house was converted into a livery stable, improving transportation for the inhabitants of Hollywood.

The Hollywood Hotel was opened in 1902 by Whitley, president of the Los Angeles Pacific Boulevard and Development Company. Having finally acquired the Hurd ranch and subdivided it, Whitley built the hotel to attract land buyers. Flanking the west side of Highland Avenue, the structure fronted on Prospect Avenue (later Hollywood Boulevard). Although it was still a dusty, unpaved road, it was regularly graded and graveled. The hotel became internationally known and was the center of civic and social life and home of movie stars for many years.

Whitley's company developed and sold one of the early residential areas, the Ocean View Tract. Whitley did much to promote the area. He paid thousands of dollars to install electricity and arrange for electric lighting, and he built both a bank and a road into the Cahuenga Pass. The lighting ran for several blocks down Prospect Avenue. Whitley's land was centered on Highland Avenue. His 1918 development, Whitley Heights, was named for him.

=== Incorporation and merger ===
Hollywood was incorporated as a municipality on November 9, 1903, by a vote of 88 for and 77 against. On January 30, 1904, the voters in Hollywood decided, 113 to 96, to banish the sale of liquor within the city, except for medicinal purposes. Neither hotels nor restaurants were allowed to serve wine or liquor before or after meals.

In 1910, the city voted for a merger with Los Angeles in order to secure an adequate water supply and to gain access to the L.A. sewer system. Hollywood would consolidate with the City of Los Angeles on February 7, 1910. Also at that time a majority (but not all of) Prospect Avenue would be renamed to Hollywood Boulevard, starting at the intersection of North Vermont Avenue.

With annexation, the name of Prospect Avenue was changed to Hollywood Boulevard and all the street numbers in the new district changed. For example, 100 Prospect Avenue, at Vermont Avenue, became 6400 Hollywood Boulevard; and 100 Cahuenga Boulevard, at Hollywood Boulevard, changed to 1700 Cahuenga Boulevard.

=== Motion picture industry ===
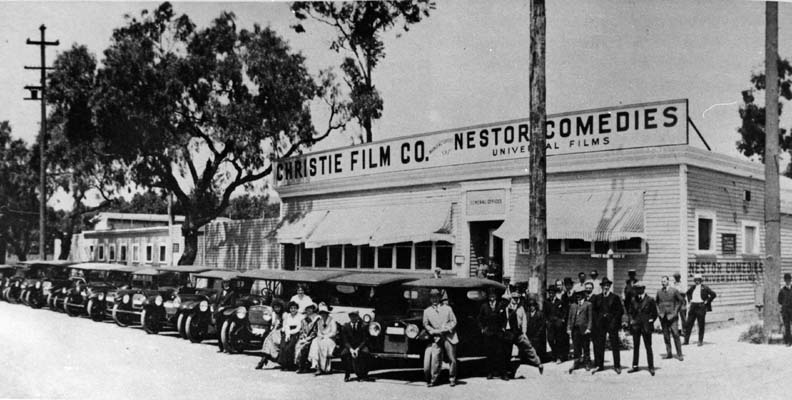
Nestor Studios, Hollywood's first movie studio, 1912

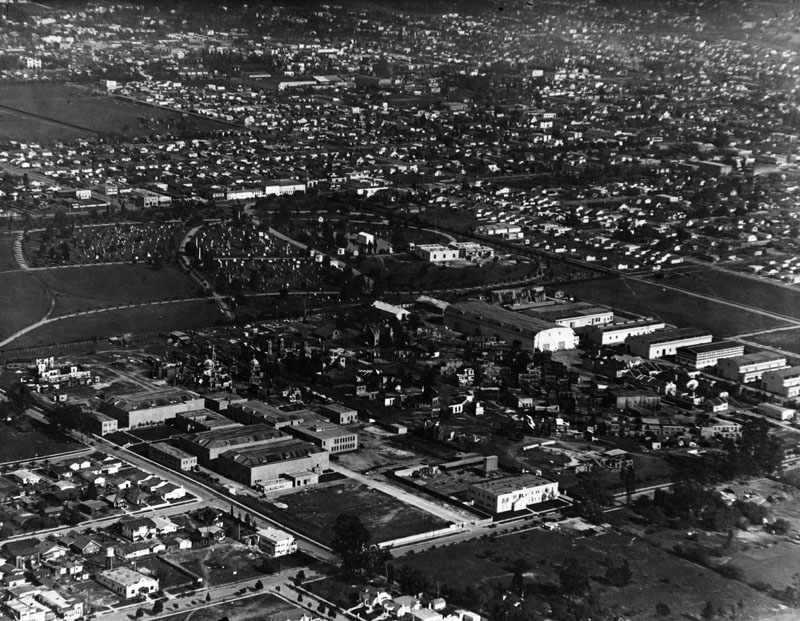
Hollywood movie studios in 1922

By 1912, major motion-picture companies had come West to set up production near or in Los Angeles.

In the early 1900s, most motion picture cameras and equipment patents were held by Thomas Edison's Motion Picture Patents Company in New Jersey, which often sued filmmakers to stop their productions. To escape this, filmmakers began moving to Los Angeles, where attempts to enforce Edison's patents were easier to evade. Also, the weather was ideal for filmmaking and there was quick access to various settings. Los Angeles became the capital of the film industry in the United States. The mountains, plains and low land prices made Hollywood a good place to establish film studios.

Director D. W. Griffith was the first to make a motion picture in Hollywood. His 17-minute short film In Old California (1910) was filmed for the Biograph Company. Although Hollywood banned movie theaters—of which it had none—before annexation that year, Los Angeles had no such restriction.

The first studio in Hollywood opened in early 1913, on Formosa Avenue down the street from Helen Muir's home. Her father John Muir returned from his tour of Europe and East Africa a few months later and continued working on Yosemite and his book The Yosemite. The Nestor Film Company was the first studio, established in October 1911 by the New Jersey–based Centaur Film Company in a roadhouse at 6121 Sunset Boulevard (the corner of Gower). Four major film companies – Paramount, Warner Bros., RKO, and Columbia – had studios in Hollywood, as did several minor companies and rental studios. In the 1920s, Hollywood was the fifth-largest industry in the nation. By the 1930s, Hollywood studios became fully vertically integrated, as production, distribution and exhibition was controlled by these companies, enabling Hollywood to produce 600 films per year.

Hollywood became known as Tinseltown and the "dream factory" because of the glittering image of the movie industry.

=== Further development ===
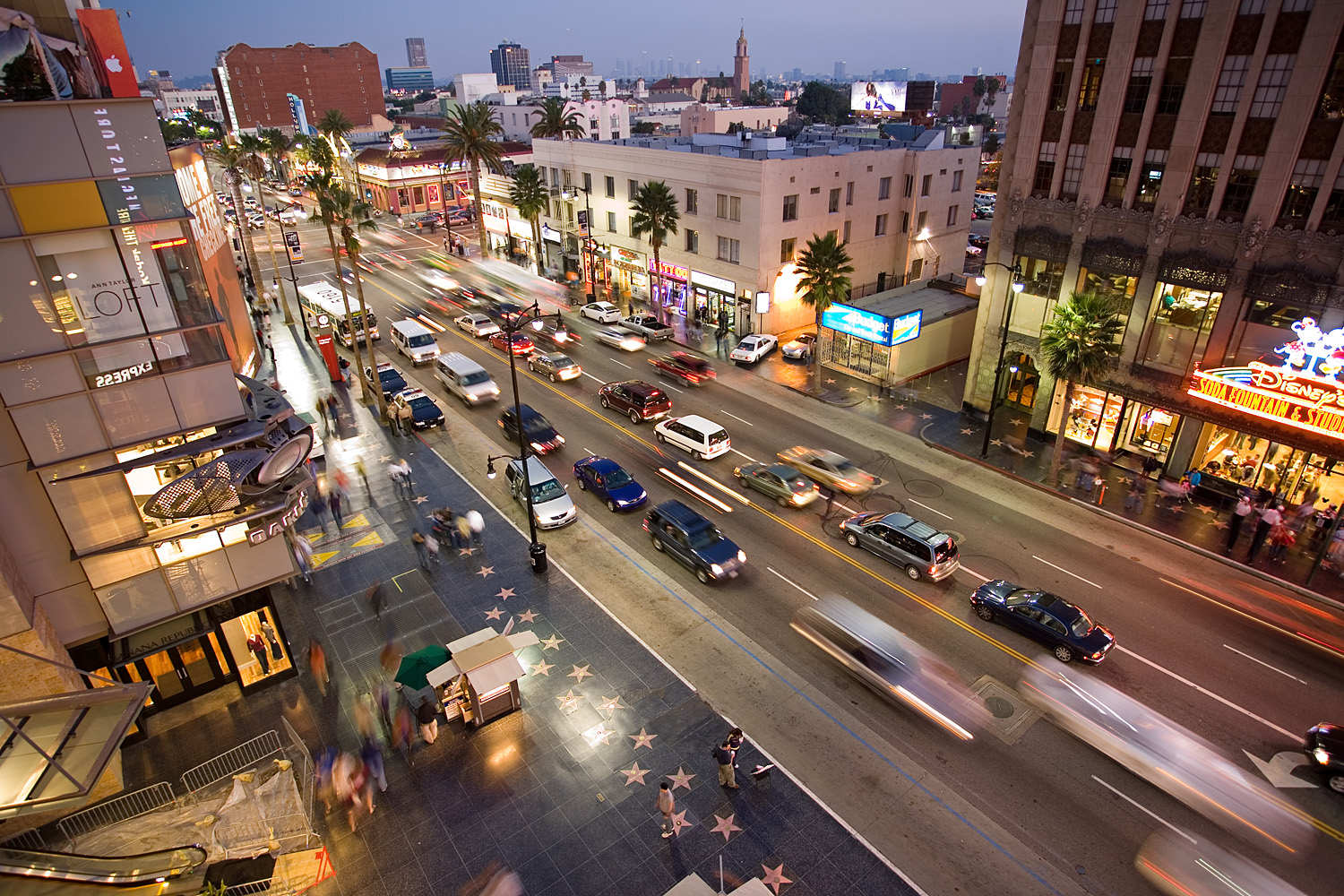
Hollywood Boulevard as seen from the Dolby Theatre in 2005

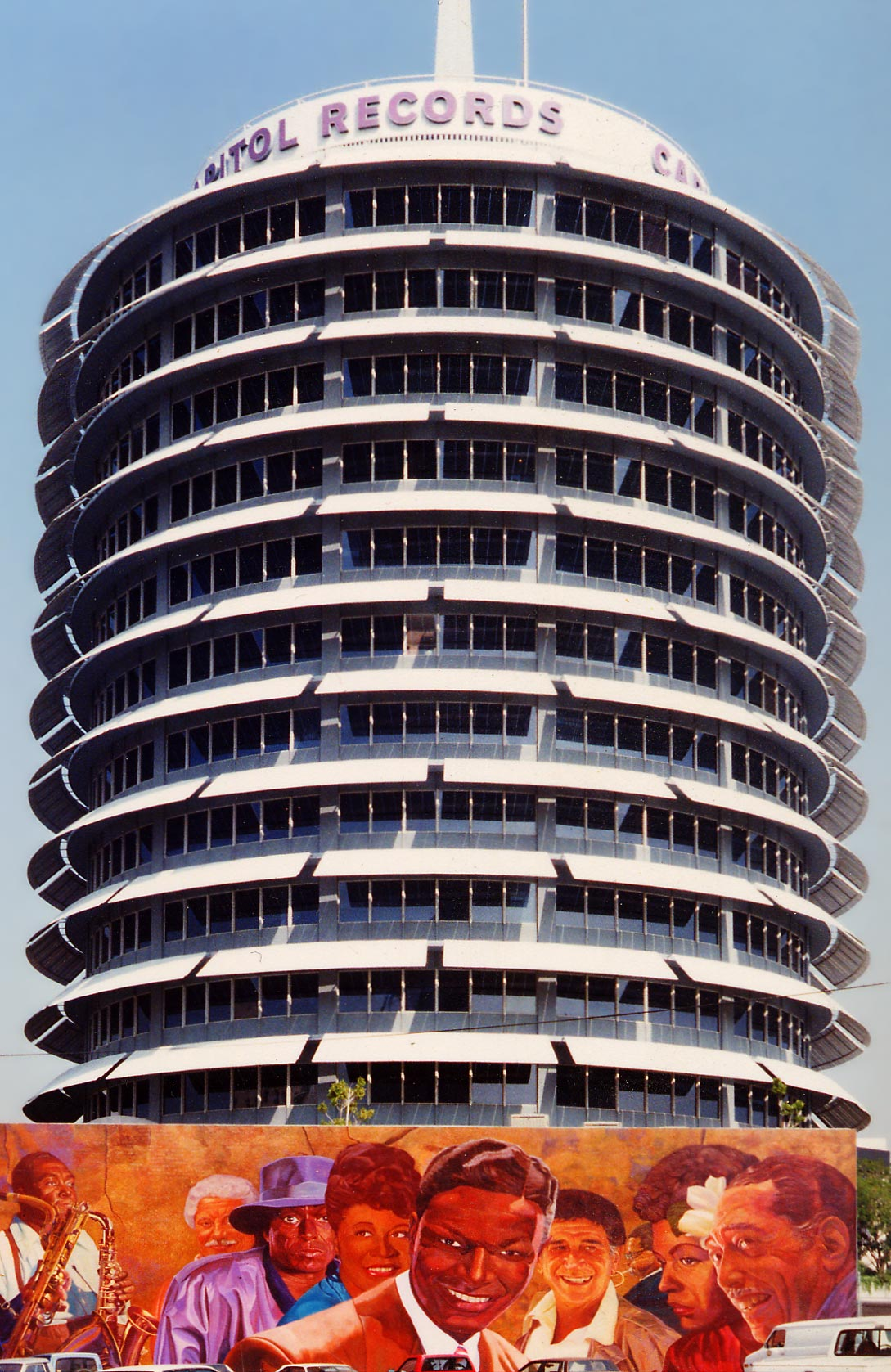
Capitol Records Building in 1991

A large sign reading HOLLYWOODLAND was erected in the Hollywood Hills in 1923 to advertise real estate developers Woodruff's and Shoults' housing development. In 1949, the Hollywood Chamber of Commerce entered a contract with the City of Los Angeles to repair and rebuild the sign. The agreement stipulated that LAND be removed to spell HOLLYWOOD so the sign would now refer to the district, rather than the housing development.

During the early 1950s, the State of California constructed the Hollywood Freeway through the northeast corner of Hollywood.

The Capitol Records Building on Vine Street, just north of Hollywood Boulevard, was built in 1956. The Hollywood Walk of Fame was created in 1958 as a tribute to artists and other significant contributors to the entertainment industry. The official opening was on February 8, 1960.

In June 1999, the Hollywood extension of the Los Angeles Metro Rail Red Line subway opened from Downtown Los Angeles to the San Fernando Valley, with stops along Hollywood Boulevard at Western Avenue (Hollywood/Western Metro station), Vine Street (Hollywood/Vine Metro station), and Highland Avenue (Hollywood/Highland Metro station).

The Dolby Theatre, which opened in 2001 as the Kodak Theatre at the Hollywood & Highland Center mall, is the site of the annual Academy Awards programs. The mall is located where the Hollywood Hotel once stood.

=== Preservation and revitalization ===
The Hollywood Boulevard Commercial and Entertainment District was listed in the National Register of Historic Places in 1985. In 1994, Hollywood, Alabama, and ten other towns named Hollywood successfully fought an attempt by the Hollywood Chamber of Commerce to trademark the name and force same-named communities to pay royalties to it.

After the neighborhood underwent years of serious decline in the 1980s, with crime, drugs and increasing poverty among some residents, many landmarks were threatened with demolition. Columbia Square, at the northwest corner of Sunset Boulevard and Gower Street, is part of the ongoing rebirth of Hollywood. The Art Deco-style studio complex, completed in 1938, was once the Hollywood headquarters for CBS. It became home to a new generation of broadcasters when cable television networks MTV, Comedy Central, BET and Spike TV consolidated their offices there in 2014 as part of a $420 million office, residential and retail complex. Paramount Skydance Corporation moved their corporate headquarters to Hollywood in August 2025 following the merger of Skydance Media and Paramount Global.

Since 2000, Hollywood has been increasingly gentrified due to revitalization by private enterprise and public planners. Over 1,200 hotel rooms have been added in the Hollywood area between 2001 and 2016. Four thousand new apartments and over thirty low to mid-rise development projects were approved in 2019.

=== Secession movement ===
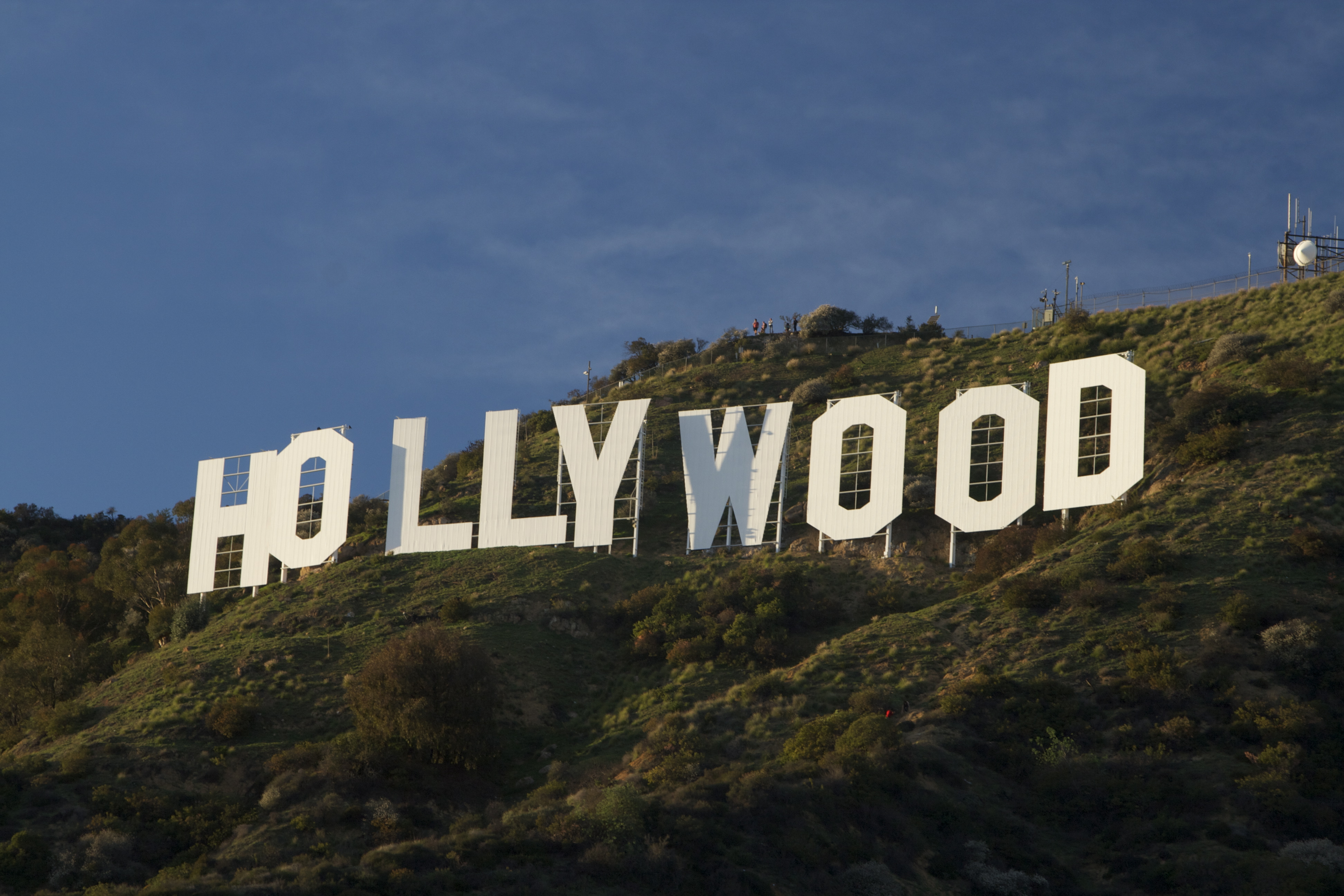
The iconic Hollywood Sign in the Hollywood Hills

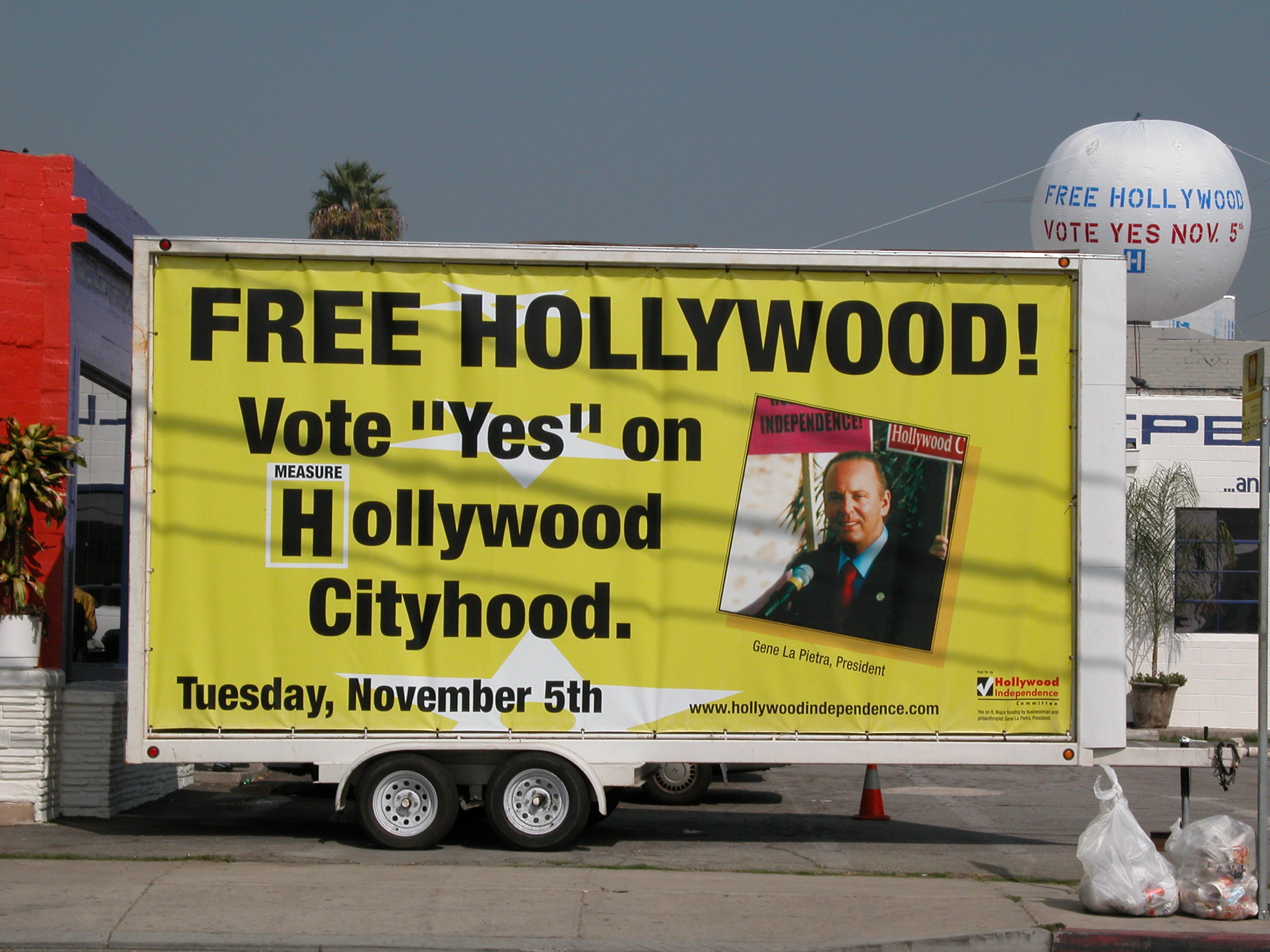
Mobile billboard promoting Hollywood secession from Los Angeles, October 2002

In 2002, some Hollywood voters began a campaign for the area to secede from Los Angeles and become a separate municipality. In June of that year, the Los Angeles County Board of Supervisors placed secession referendums for both Hollywood and the San Fernando Valley on the ballot. To pass, they required the approval of a majority of voters in the proposed new municipality as well as a majority of voters in all of Los Angeles. In the November election, both measures failed by wide margins in the citywide vote.

== Geography ==
According to the Mapping L.A. project of the Los Angeles Times, Hollywood is flanked by the Hollywood Hills to the north, Los Feliz to the northeast, East Hollywood or Virgil Village to the east, Larchmont and Hancock Park to the south, Fairfax to the southwest, West Hollywood to the west, and Hollywood Hills West to the northwest.

Street limits of the Hollywood neighborhood are: north, Hollywood Boulevard from La Brea Avenue to the east boundary of Wattles Garden Park and Franklin Avenue between Bonita and Western avenues; east, Western Avenue; south, Melrose Avenue, and west, La Brea Avenue or the West Hollywood city line.

In 1918, H. J. Whitley commissioned architect A. S. Barnes to design Whitley Heights as a Mediterranean-style village on the hills above Hollywood Boulevard. It became the first celebrity community.

Other areas within Hollywood are Franklin Village, Little Armenia, Spaulding Square, Thai Town, and Yucca Corridor.

== Climate ==
Hollywood, California

Climate chart (precipitation, max. and min. temperature)
| J | F | M | A | M | J | J | A | S | O | N | D |
| 3.5 68 48 | 3.8 68 49 | 3.2 69 51 | 0.9 72 53 | 0.3 73 57 | 0.1 77 60 | 0 82 63 | 0.1 83 64 | 0.4 82 62 | 0.4 78 58 | 1.2 72 52 | 2 67 48 |
- █ Average max. and min. temperatures in °F
- █ Precipitation totals in inches
Metric conversion
| J | F | M | A | M | J | J | A | S | O | N | D |
| 89 20 9 | 97 20 9 | 81 21 11 | 23 22 12 | 7.6 23 14 | 2.5 25 16 | 0 28 17 | 2.5 28 18 | 10 28 17 | 10 26 14 | 30 22 11 | 51 19 9 |
- █ Average max. and min. temperatures in °C
- █ Precipitation totals in mm

Like the rest of Los Angeles, Hollywood has a hot-summer Mediterranean climate (Köppen: Csa) or dry-summer subtropical climate. Winters are typically mild and with light rain, but there are still plenty of warm, sunny days in the winter, as well. Summers are hot, sunny and dry, with virtually no rain falling between April and October; while summer days can be warm, they are considerably cooler than in the San Fernando Valley. Spring and fall are generally warm, sunny, and pleasant. Santa Ana winds typically occur during the fall and winter months, although they can occur during any month; Santa Ana winds bring heavy winds, higher temperatures and lower humidity levels, which increases the risk of wildfires, especially in dry years. Smog can sometimes occur during the summer months. May and June can be foggy and cloudy in Hollywood, a phenomenon known by southern California residents as "May Gray" or "June Gloom".

The all-time record high temperature in Hollywood is 112 °F (44 °C) on June 26, 1990, and the all-time record low temperature is 24 °F (−4 °C) on both December 8, 1978, and December 23, 1990.

Climate data for Hollywood, Los Angeles, California
| Month | Jan | Feb | Mar | Apr | May | Jun | Jul | Aug | Sep | Oct | Nov | Dec | Year |
|---|---|---|---|---|---|---|---|---|---|---|---|---|---|
| Record high °F (°C) | 91 (33) | 91 (33) | 94 (34) | 106 (41) | 102 (39) | 112 (44) | 107 (42) | 105 (41) | 110 (43) | 108 (42) | 100 (38) | 92 (33) | 112 (44) |
| Mean daily maximum °F (°C) | 67.5 (19.7) | 67.8 (19.9) | 69.1 (20.6) | 71.7 (22.1) | 73.4 (23.0) | 76.8 (24.9) | 81.7 (27.6) | 83.2 (28.4) | 82.1 (27.8) | 77.7 (25.4) | 72.2 (22.3) | 67.1 (19.5) | 74.2 (23.4) |
| Mean daily minimum °F (°C) | 48.1 (8.9) | 49.0 (9.4) | 50.7 (10.4) | 53.0 (11.7) | 56.6 (13.7) | 59.8 (15.4) | 63.3 (17.4) | 63.7 (17.6) | 62.4 (16.9) | 58.2 (14.6) | 52.1 (11.2) | 47.6 (8.7) | 55.4 (13.0) |
| Record low °F (°C) | 28 (−2) | 34 (1) | 35 (2) | 37 (3) | 42 (6) | 49 (9) | 53 (12) | 51 (11) | 46 (8) | 40 (4) | 34 (1) | 24 (−4) | 24 (−4) |
| Average precipitation inches (mm) | 3.47 (88) | 3.81 (97) | 3.24 (82) | 0.85 (22) | 0.31 (7.9) | 0.07 (1.8) | 0.02 (0.51) | 0.14 (3.6) | 0.35 (8.9) | 0.39 (9.9) | 1.16 (29) | 1.98 (50) | 15.80 (401) |

== Demographics ==
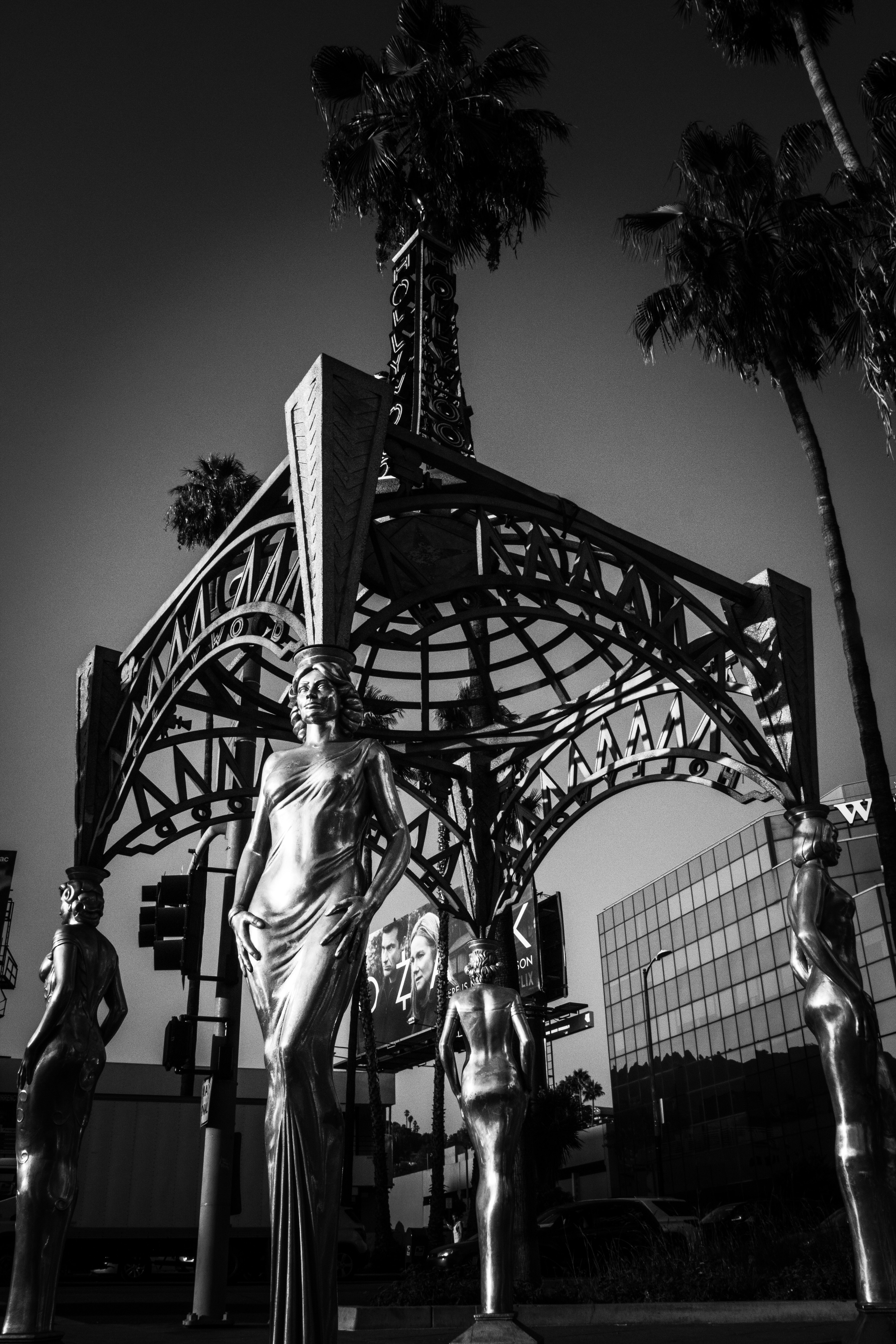
The Four Ladies of Hollywood sculpture on Hollywood Boulevard in 2018

The 2000 U.S. census counted 77,818 residents in the 3.51-square-mile (9.1 km^{2}) Hollywood neighborhood—an average of 22,193 people per square mile (8,569 people/km^{2}), the seventh-densest neighborhood in all of Los Angeles County. In 2008 the city estimated that the population had increased to 85,489. The median age for residents was 31, about the city's average.

Hollywood was said to be "highly diverse" when compared to the city at large. The ethnic breakdown in 2000 was 42.2% Latino or Hispanic, 41% Non-Hispanic White, 7.1% Asian, 5.2% Black, and 4.5% other. Mexico (21.3%) and Guatemala (13%) were the most common places of birth for the 53.8% of the residents who were born abroad, a figure that was considered high for the city as a whole.

The median household income in 2008 was $33,694, considered low for Los Angeles. The average household size of 2.1 people was also lower than the city norm. Renters occupied 92.4% of the housing units, and home- or apartment owners the rest.

The percentages of never-married men (55.1%), never-married women (39.8%) and widows (9.6%) were among the county's highest. There were 2,640 families headed by single parents, about average for Los Angeles.

In 2000, there were 2,828 military veterans, or 4.5%, a low rate for the city as a whole.

=== Homelessness ===
In 2022, there were 1,374 homeless individuals in Hollywood.

== Radio and television ==
KNX was the last radio station to broadcast from Hollywood before it left CBS Columbia Square for a studio in the Miracle Mile in 2005.

On January 22, 1947, the first commercial television station west of the Mississippi River, KTLA, began operating in Hollywood. In December of that year, The Public Prosecutor became the first network television series to be filmed in Hollywood. Television stations KTLA and KSCN-TV, both on Sunset Boulevard, are the last broadcasters (television or radio) with Hollywood addresses; KCET has since sold the former KCET Studios to the Church of Scientology in 2011, and relocated to The Pointe in Burbank in 2012. KNBC moved in 1962 from the former NBC Radio City Studios at the northeast corner of Sunset Boulevard and Vine Street to NBC Studios in Burbank. KTTV moved in 1996 from its former home at Metromedia Square on Sunset Boulevard to West Los Angeles, and KCOP left its home on La Brea Avenue to join KTTV at the modern-day Fox Television Center. KCBS-TV and KCAL-TV moved from their longtime home at CBS Columbia Square on Sunset Boulevard to a new facility at CBS Studio Center in Studio City.

== Government ==
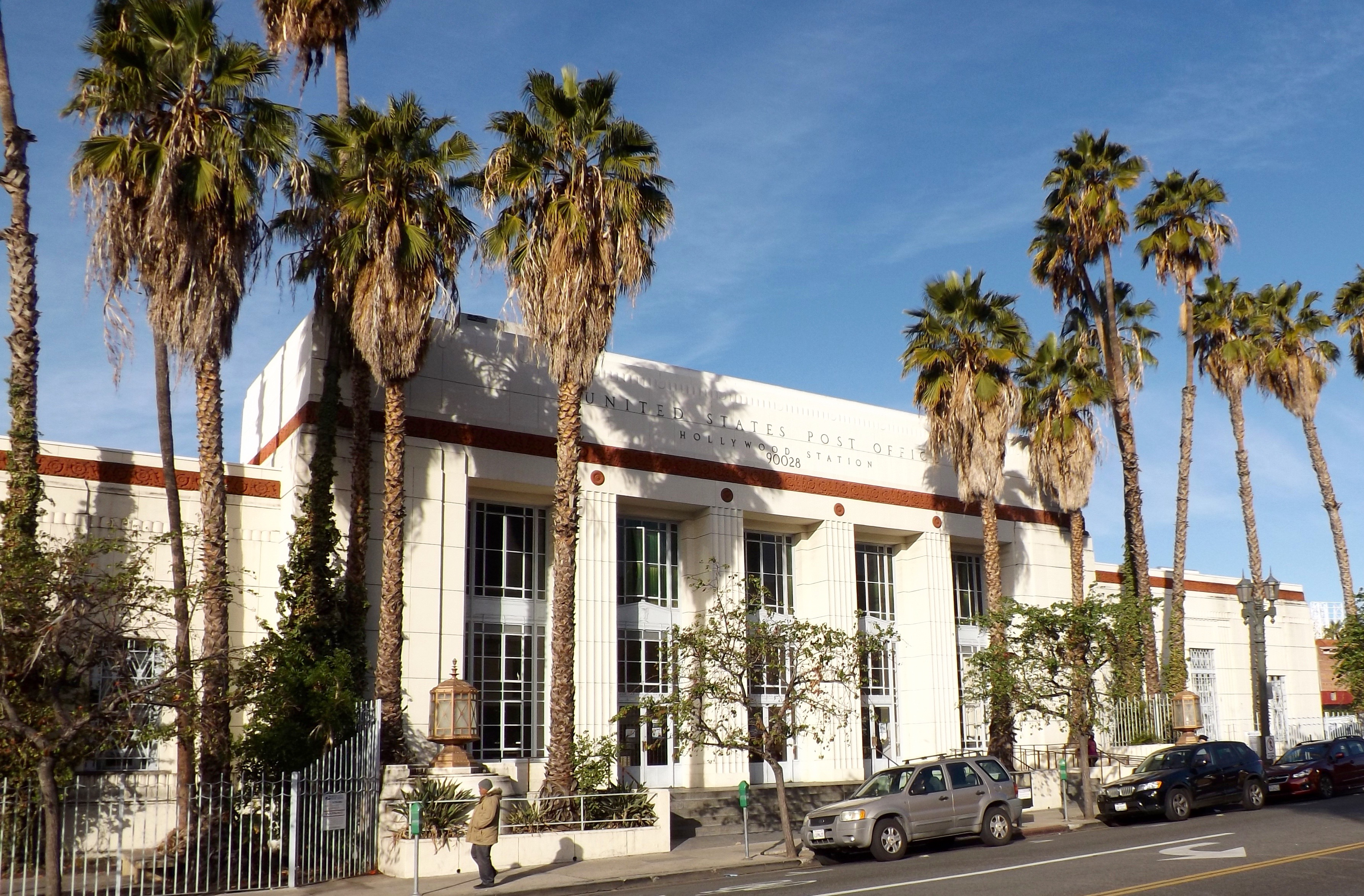
Hollywood Post Office in 2015

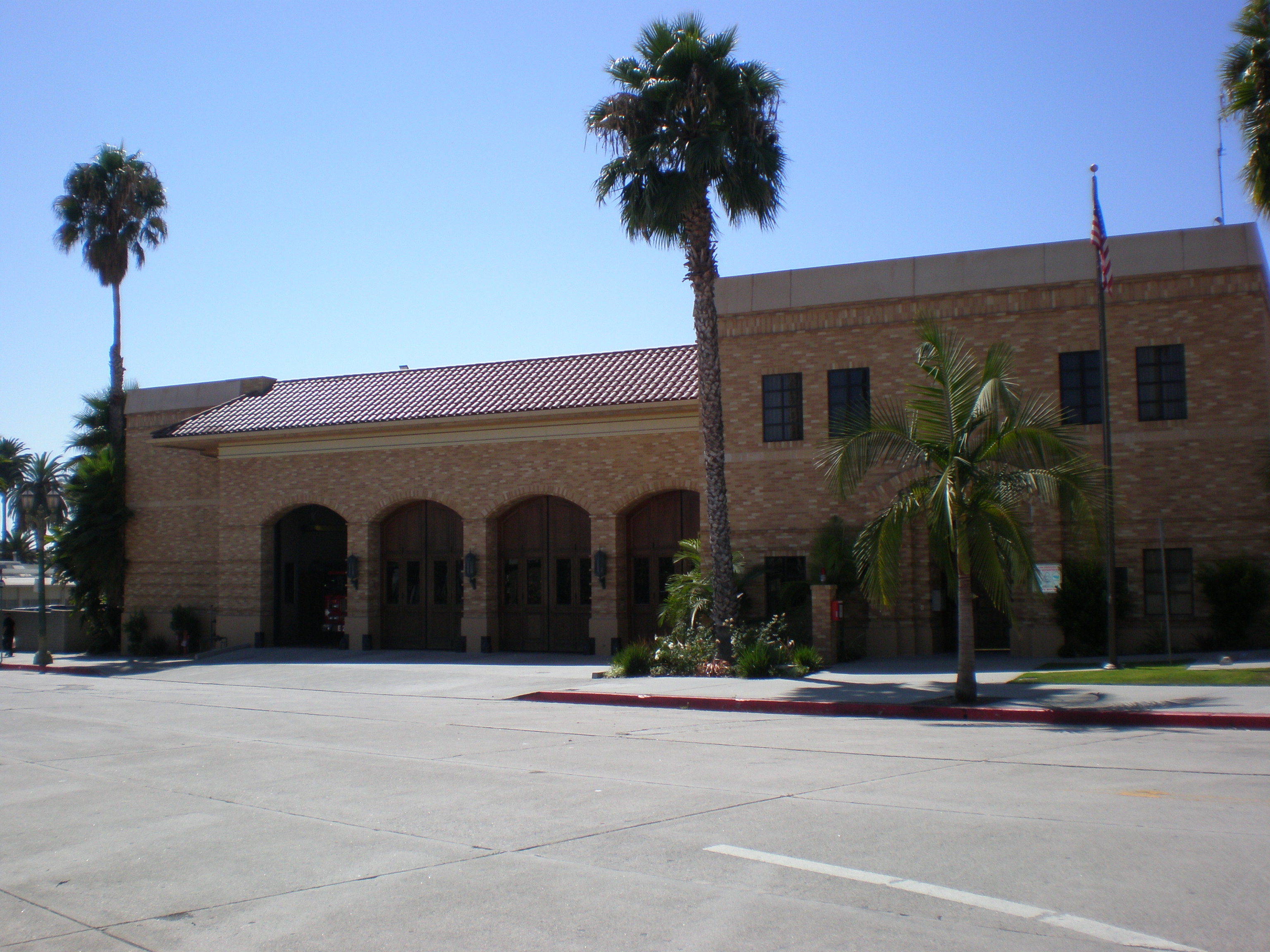
Hollywood Fire Station 27 in 2010

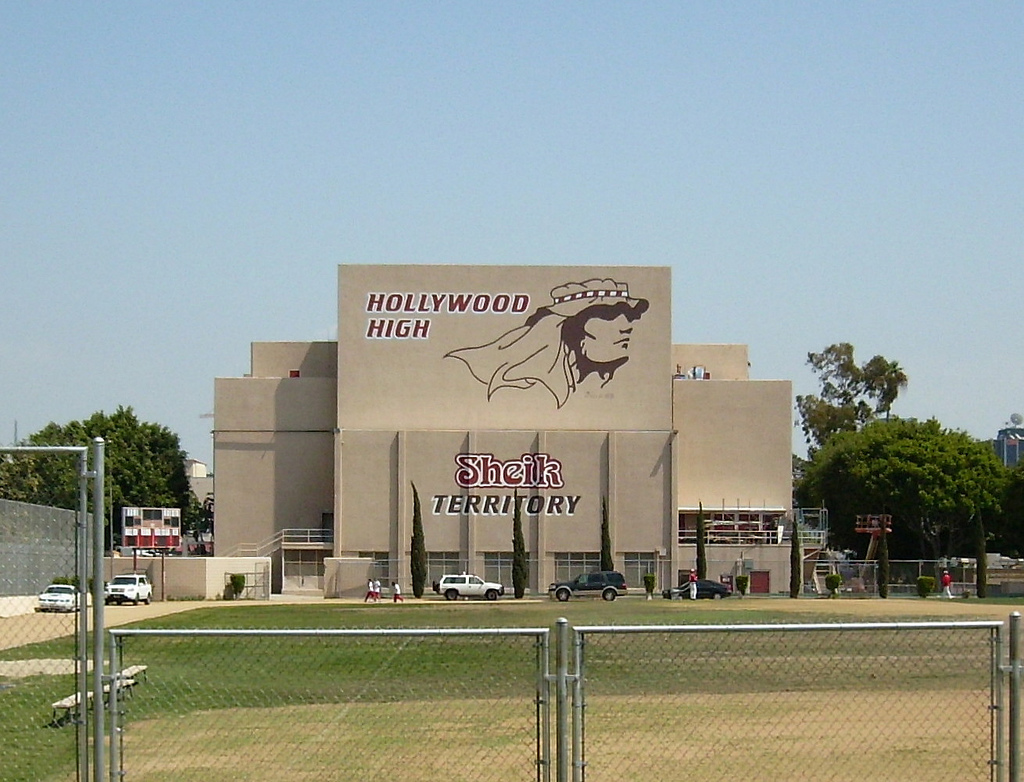
Hollywood High School in 2008

As a neighborhood within the Los Angeles city limits, Hollywood does not have its own municipal government. A person was appointed by the Hollywood Chamber of Commerce to serve as an honorary "Mayor of Hollywood" for ceremonial purposes. Johnny Grant held this position from 1980 until his death on January 9, 2008.

=== Emergency services ===
The Los Angeles Police Department is responsible for police services. The Hollywood police station is at 1358 N. Wilcox Avenue.

Los Angeles Fire Department operates four fire stations, 27, 41, 52, and 82 in the area.

The Los Angeles County Department of Health Services operates the Hollywood-Wilshire Health Center in Hollywood.

=== Post office ===
The United States Postal Service operates the Hollywood Post Office, the Hollywood Pavilion Post Office, and the Sunset Post Office.

=== Neighborhood councils ===
Hollywood is included within the Hollywood United Neighborhood Council (HUNC), Hollywood Hills West Neighborhood Council, and the Hollywood Studio District Neighborhood Council. Neighborhood Councils cast advisory votes on such issues as zoning, planning, and other community issues. The council members are voted in by stakeholders, generally defined as anyone living, working, owning property, or belonging to an organization within the boundaries of the council.

== Education ==
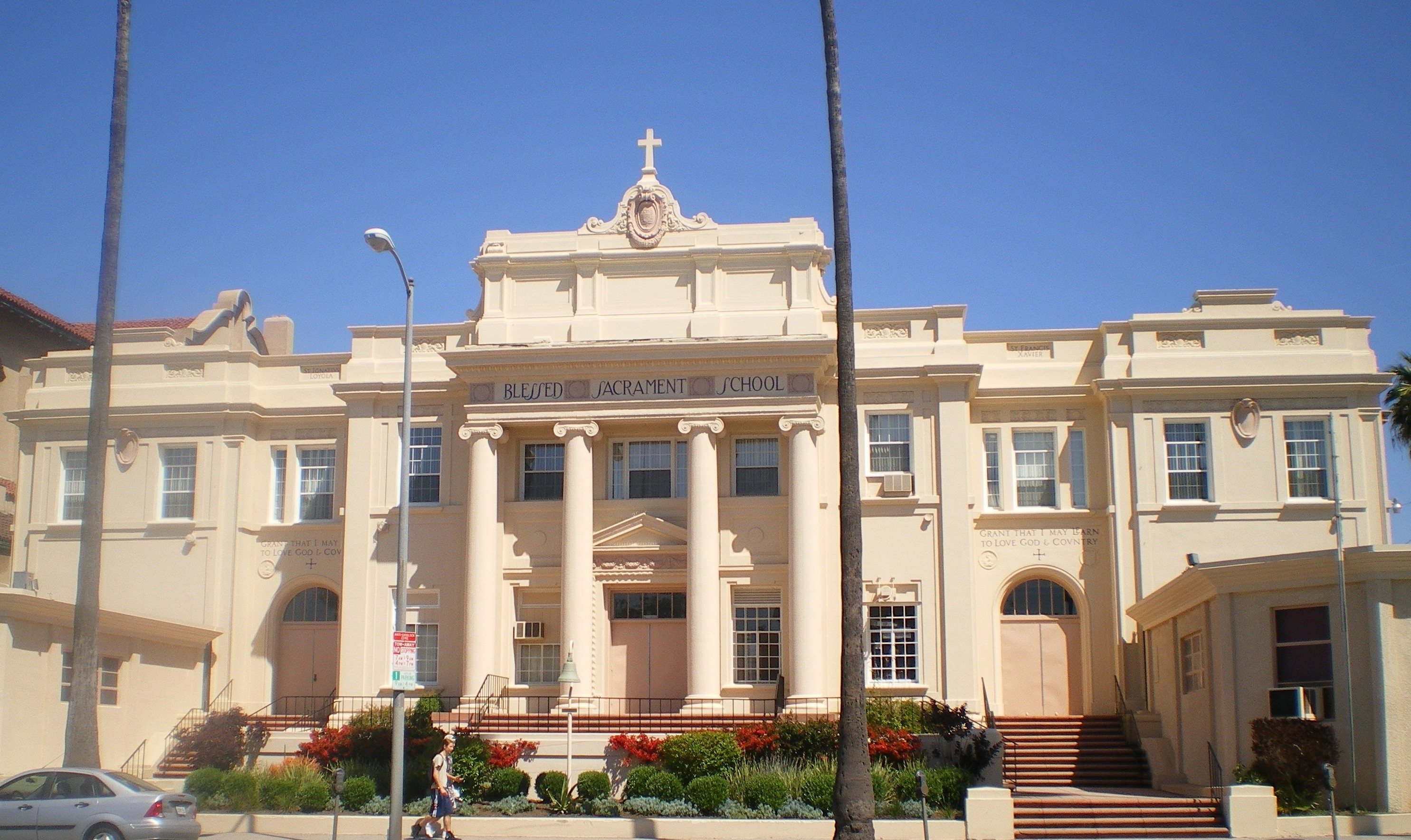
Blessed Sacrament Catholic School

Hollywood residents aged 25 and older holding a four-year degree amounted to 28% of the population in 2000, about the same as in the county at large.

=== Public libraries ===
The Will and Ariel Durant Branch, John C. Fremont Branch, and the Frances Howard Goldwyn – Hollywood Regional Branch of the Los Angeles Public Library are in Hollywood.

=== Schools ===
Public schools are operated by the Los Angeles Unified School District (LAUSD).

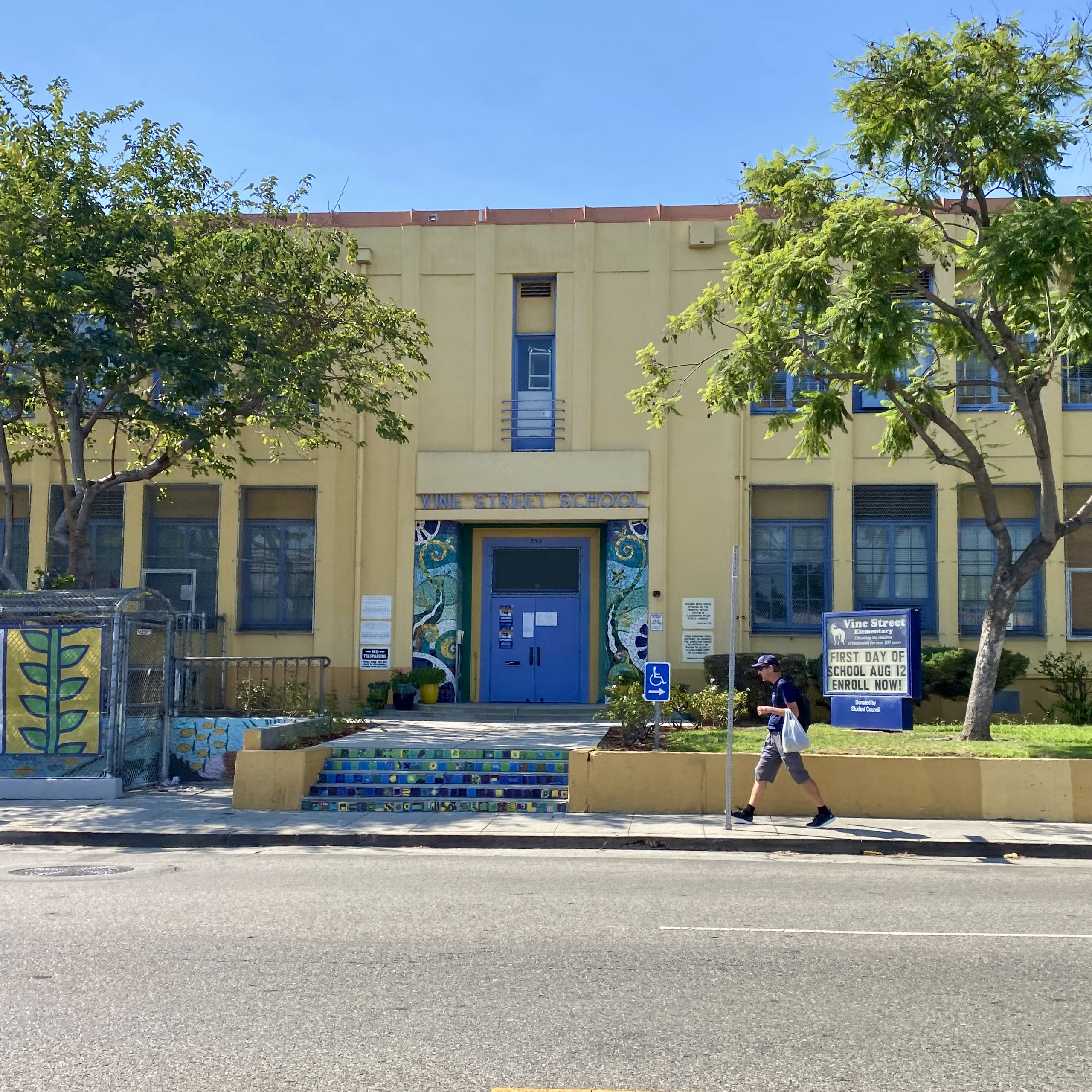
Vine Street Elementary School

Schools in Hollywood include:

- Temple Israel of Hollywood Day School, private, 7300 Hollywood Boulevard
- Gardner Street Elementary School, LAUSD, 7450 Hawthorne Avenue
- Selma Avenue Elementary School, LAUSD, 6611 Selma Avenue
- Grant Elementary School, 1530 North Wilton Place
- Young Hollywood, private elementary, 1547 North McCadden Place
- Hollywood High School, LAUSD, 1521 North Highland Avenue
- Hollywood Community Adult School, LAUSD, 1521 North Highland Avenue
- Blessed Sacrament School, private elementary, 6641 Sunset Boulevard
- Helen Bernstein High School, LAUSD, 1309 North Wilton Place
- Richard A. Alonzo Community Day School, LAUSD, 5755 Fountain Avenue
- Beverly Hills RC School, private elementary, 6550 Fountain Avenue
- Hollywood Schoolhouse, private elementary, 1233 North McCadden Place
- Joseph LeConte Middle School, LAUSD, 1316 North Bronson Avenue
- Hollywood Primary Center, LAUSD elementary, 1115 Tamarind Avenue
- Santa Monica Boulevard Community Charter School, 1022 North Van Ness Avenue
- Vine Street Elementary School, LAUSD, 955 North Vine Street
- Hubert Howe Bancroft Middle School, LAUSD, 929 North Las Palmas Avenue
- Larchmont Charter School, elementary, 815 North El Centro Avenue
- Cheder Menachem, private elementary, 1606 South La Cienega Boulevard

=== Colleges ===
- AFI Conservatory, 2021 N Western Avenue
- Emerson College ELA-Hollywood Center, 5960 Sunset Boulevard
- Los Angeles City College, 855 N Vermont Avenue
- Los Angeles Film School, 6363 Sunset Boulevard
- Los Angeles Recording School, 6690 Sunset Boulevard

== Notable places ==
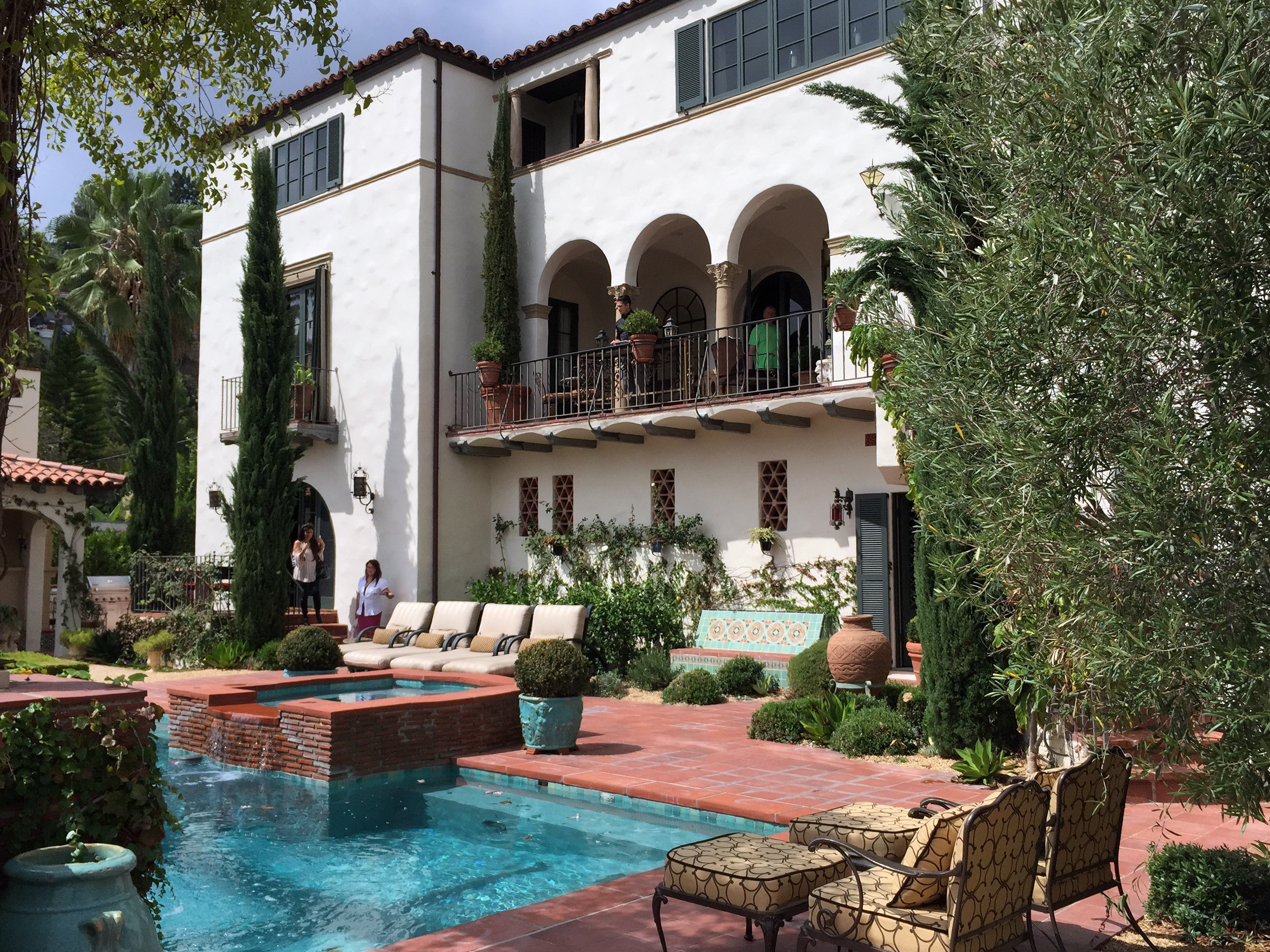
Victor Rossetti House, a Spanish Revival style estate built in 1928 by architect Paul R. Williams

- CBS Columbia Square
- Chaplin-Keaton-Lloyd Alley
- Charlie Chaplin Studios
- Cinerama Dome
- Crossroads of the World
- Dolby Theatre
- Earl Carroll Theatre
- El Capitan Theatre
- Frederick's of Hollywood
- Gower Gulch
- Grauman's Chinese Theatre
- Grauman's Egyptian Theatre
- Hollywood & Western Building
- Ovation Hollywood
- Hollywood and Vine
- Hollywood Forever Cemetery
- Hollywood Heights, Los Angeles
- Hollywood Heritage Museum
- Hollywood Palladium
- Hollywood Masonic Temple
- Hollywood Museum
- Hollywood Walk of Fame
- Hollywood Wax Museum
- Knickerbocker Hotel
- Madame Tussauds Hollywood
- Musso & Frank Grill
- Pantages Theatre
- Roosevelt Hotel
- Sunset Gower Studios

== Annual events ==
The Academy Awards, which honor the preceding year in film, have been held every year in late February/early March since 2004; prior to 2004, they were held in late March/early April. Since 2002, the Oscars have been held at the Dolby Theatre (formerly Kodak Theatre) at Hollywood Boulevard and Highland Avenue, with the exception of 2020, when due to the COVID-19 pandemic they were held in Los Angeles Union Station.

The annual Hollywood Christmas Parade goes down Hollywood Boulevard and is broadcast in the Los Angeles area on KTLA and around the United States on Tribune-owned stations and the WGN superstation. The 75th edition of the parade was held in 2006.

The Hollywood Half Marathon began in 2012 and takes place every April. The event includes a Half Marathon, 10K, 5K, and Kids Fun Run along Hollywood Blvd., and is used to raise funds and awareness for local youth homeless shelters.

== Gallery ==
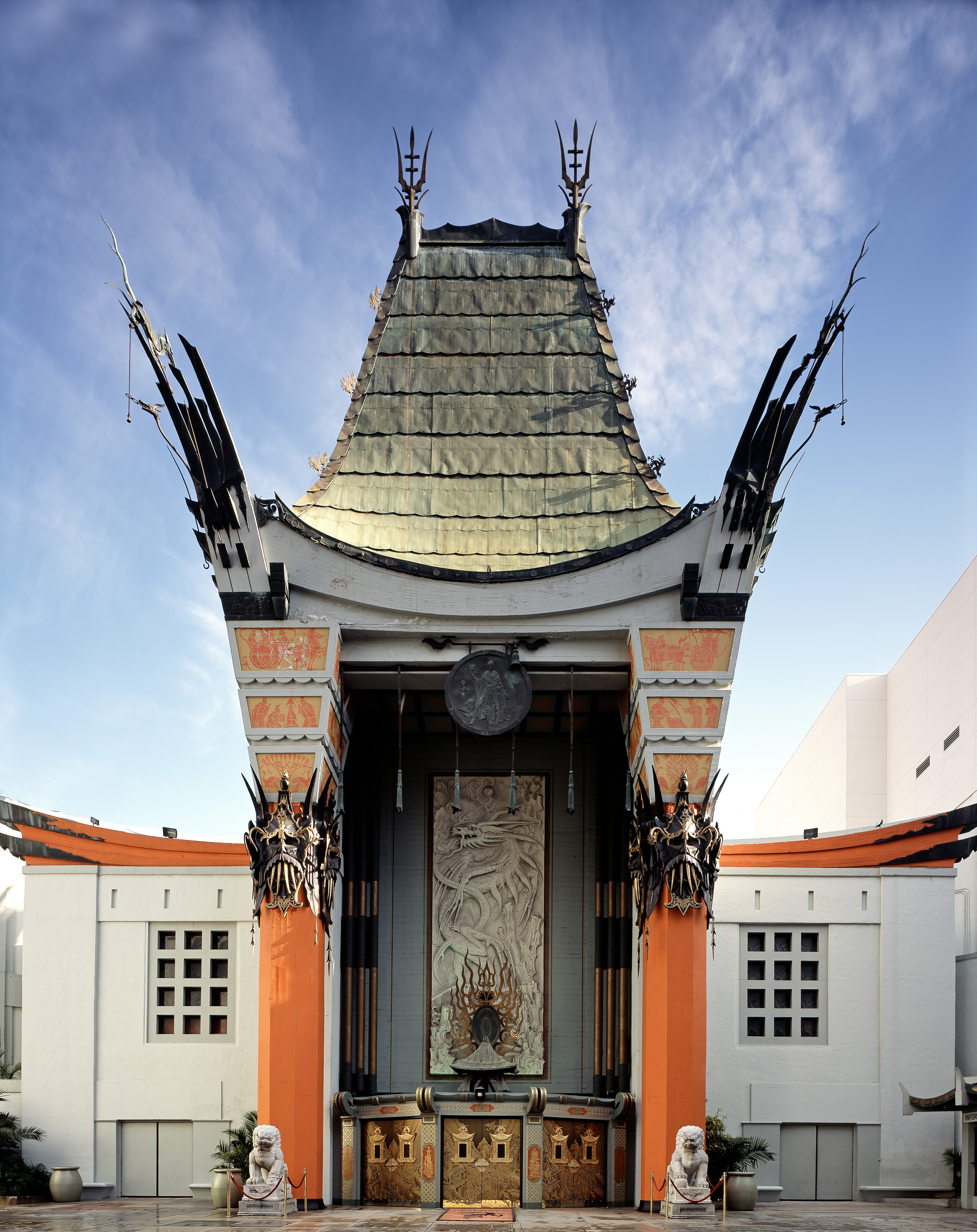
Grauman's Chinese Theatre before 2007

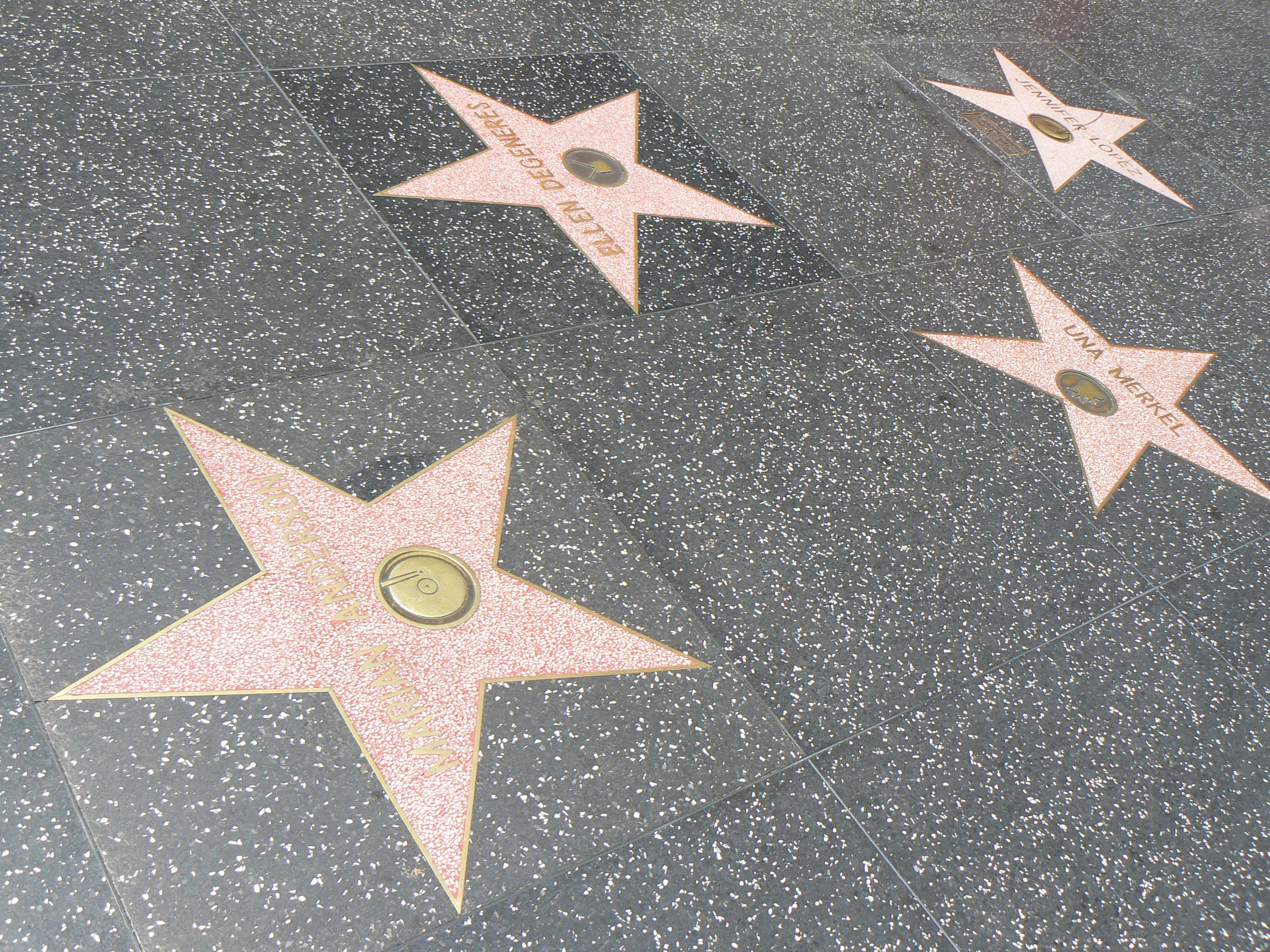
Hollywood Walk of Fame

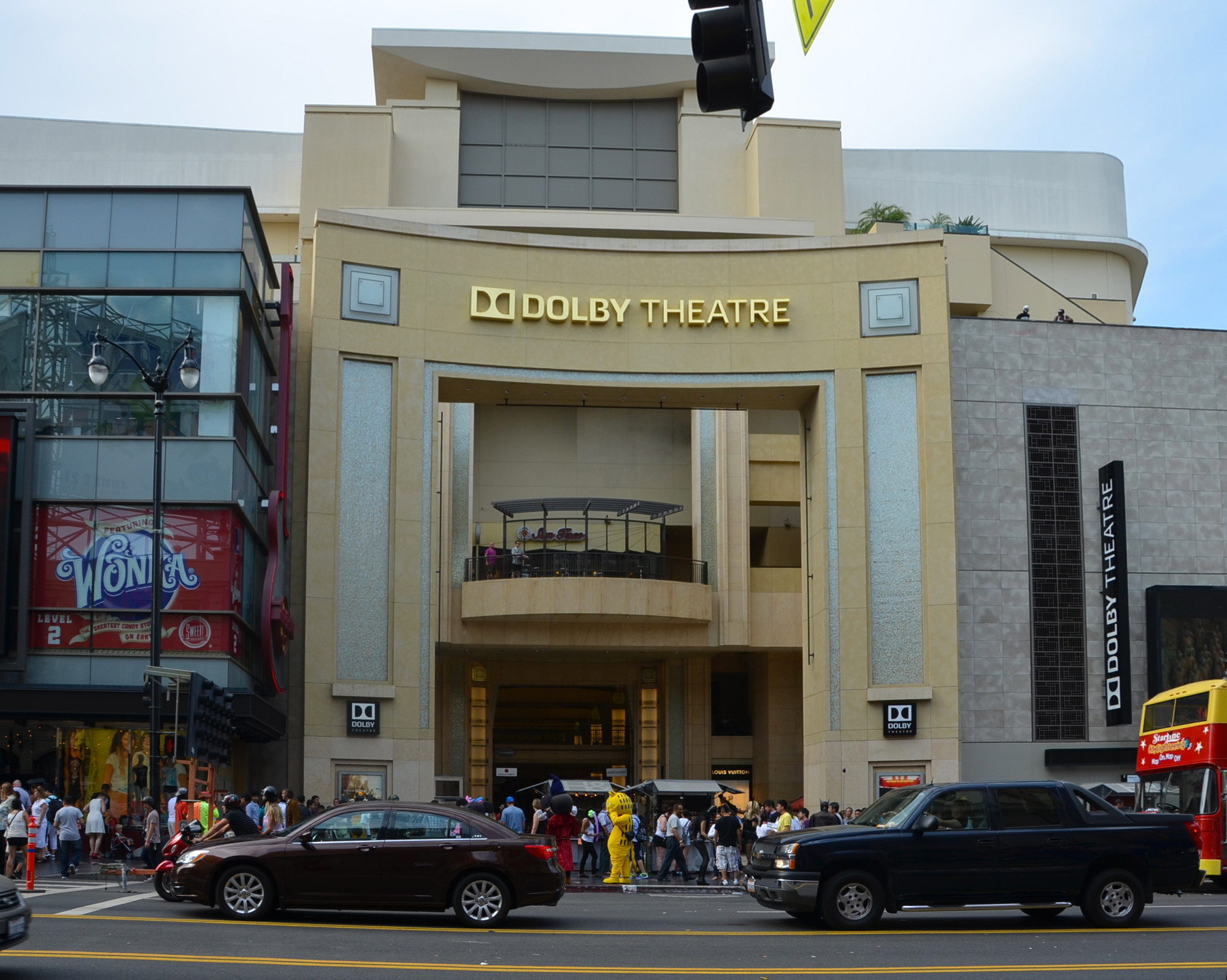
Dolby Theatre

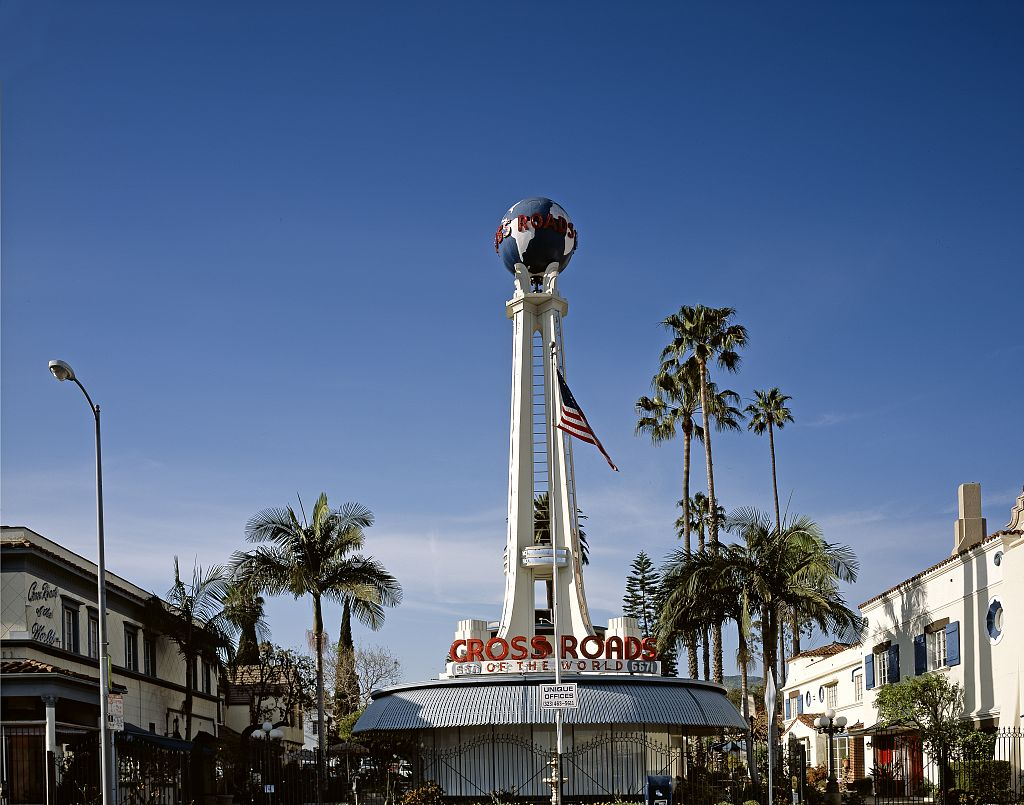
Crossroads of the World

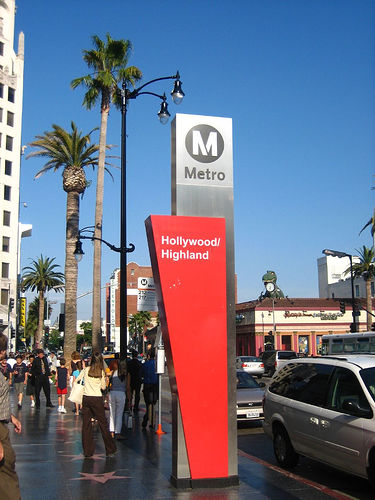
Los Angeles Metro Rail station in Hollywood

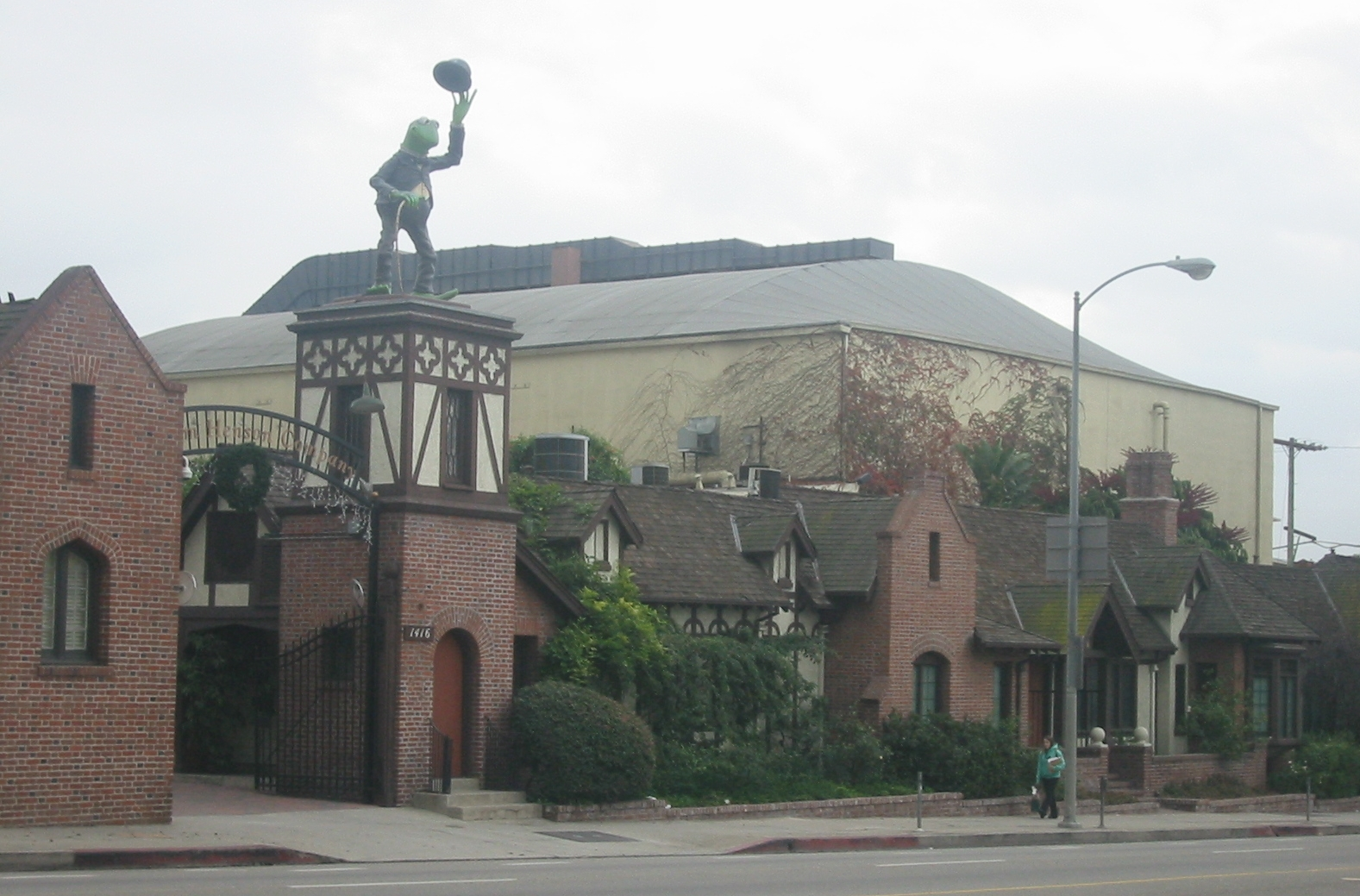
The Jim Henson Studio and former Charlie Chaplin Studios

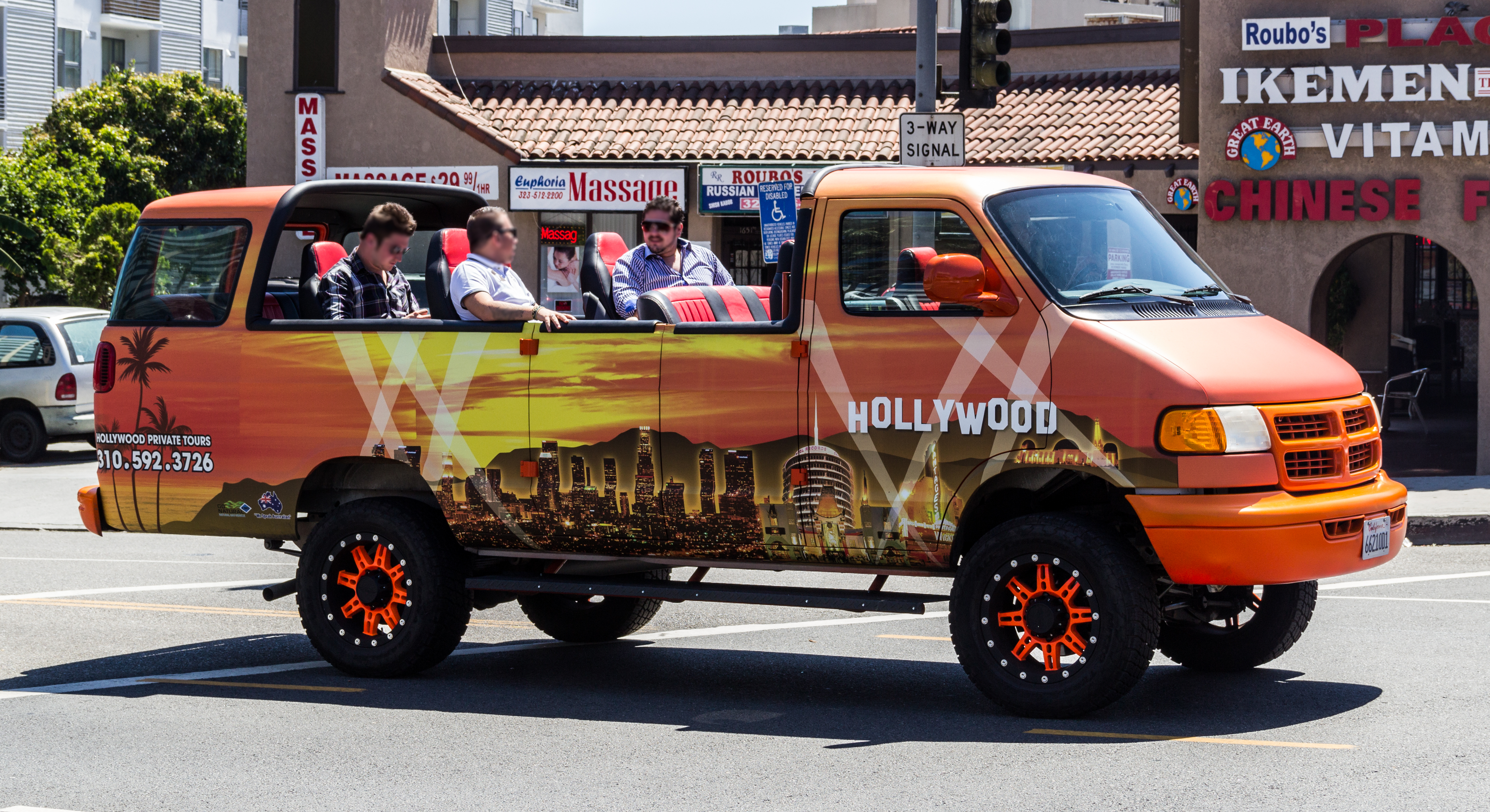
Tour bus on Hollywood Boulevard

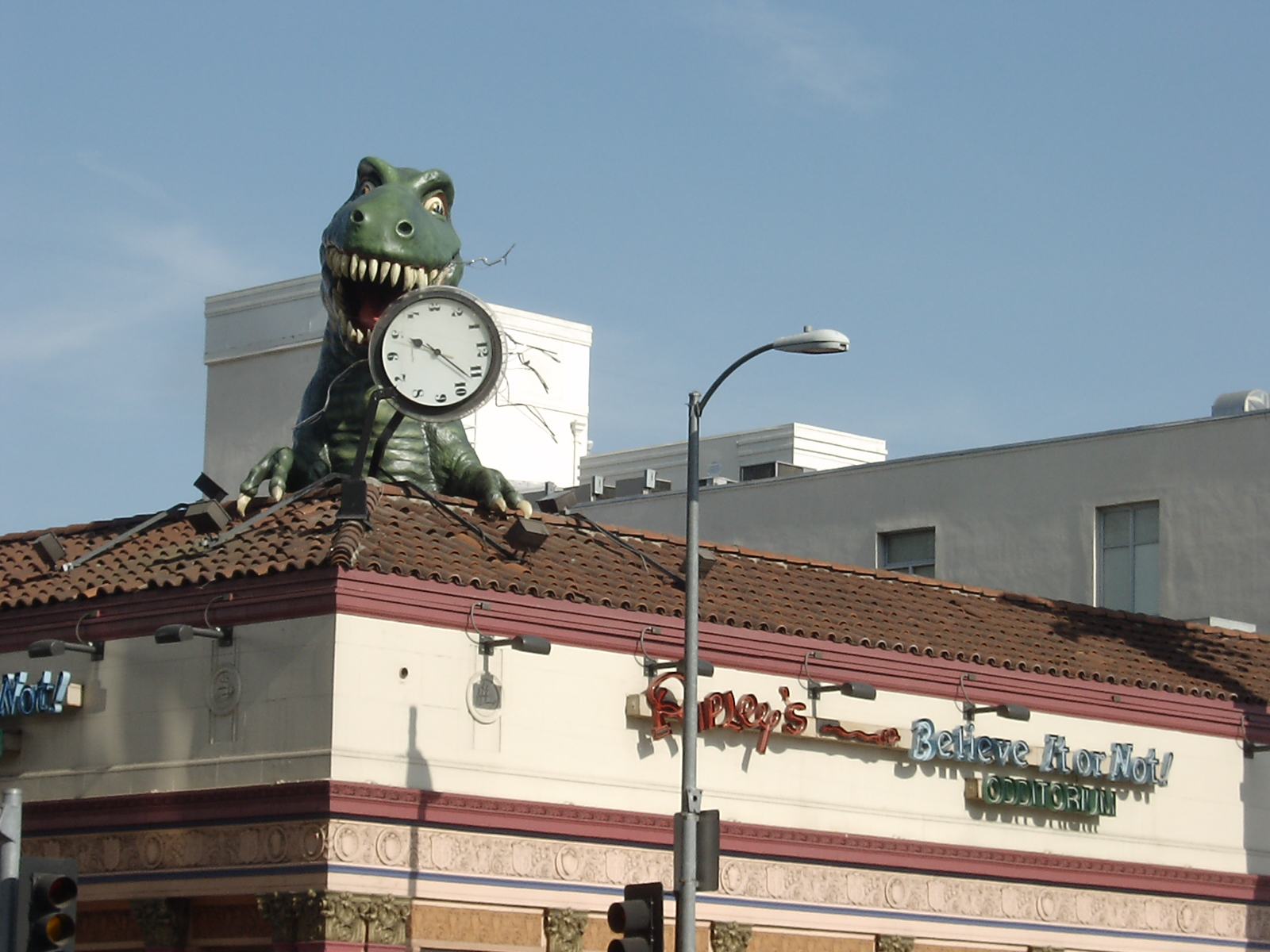
Ripley's Believe It or Not! Odditorium

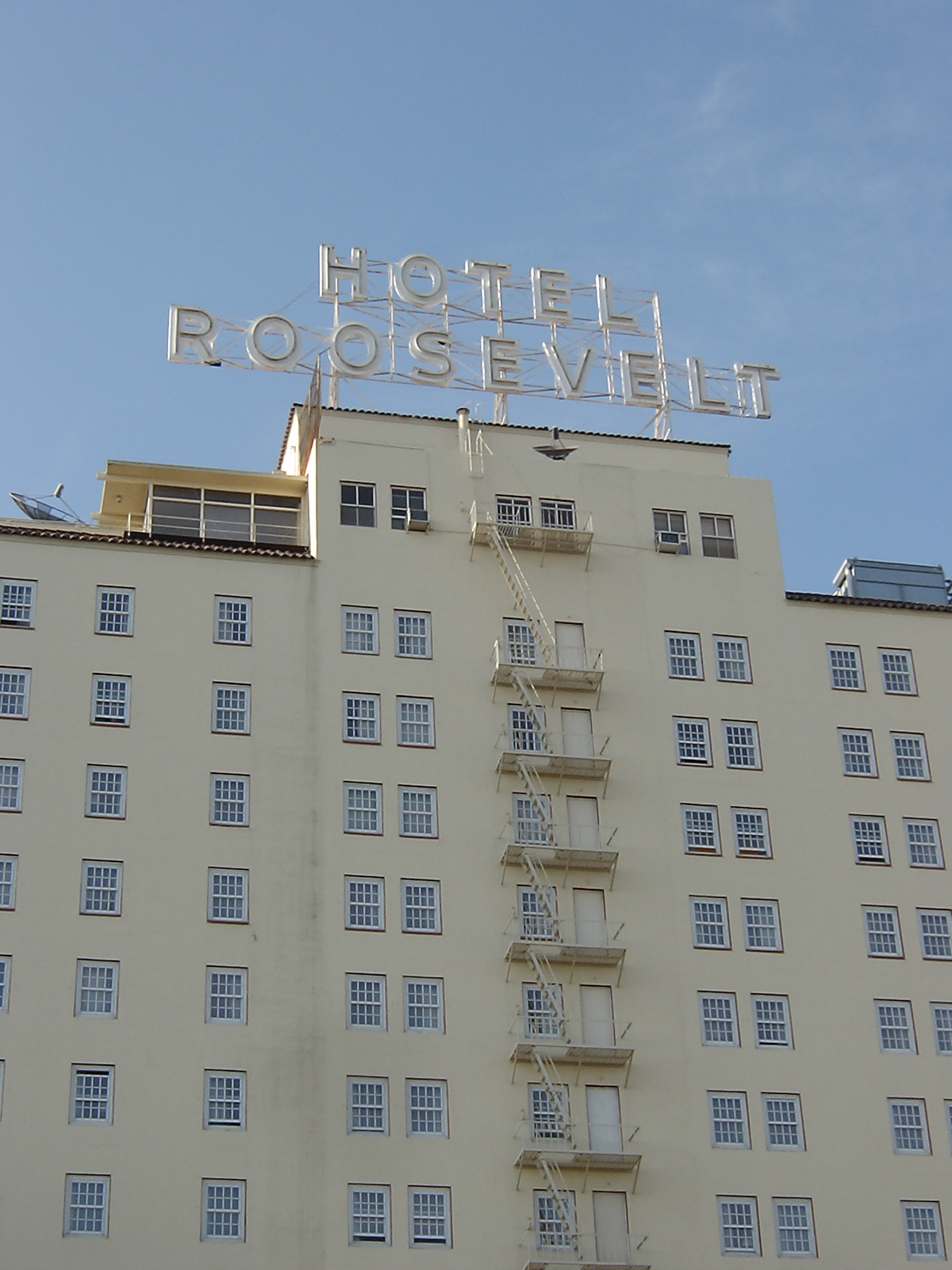
The Hotel Roosevelt

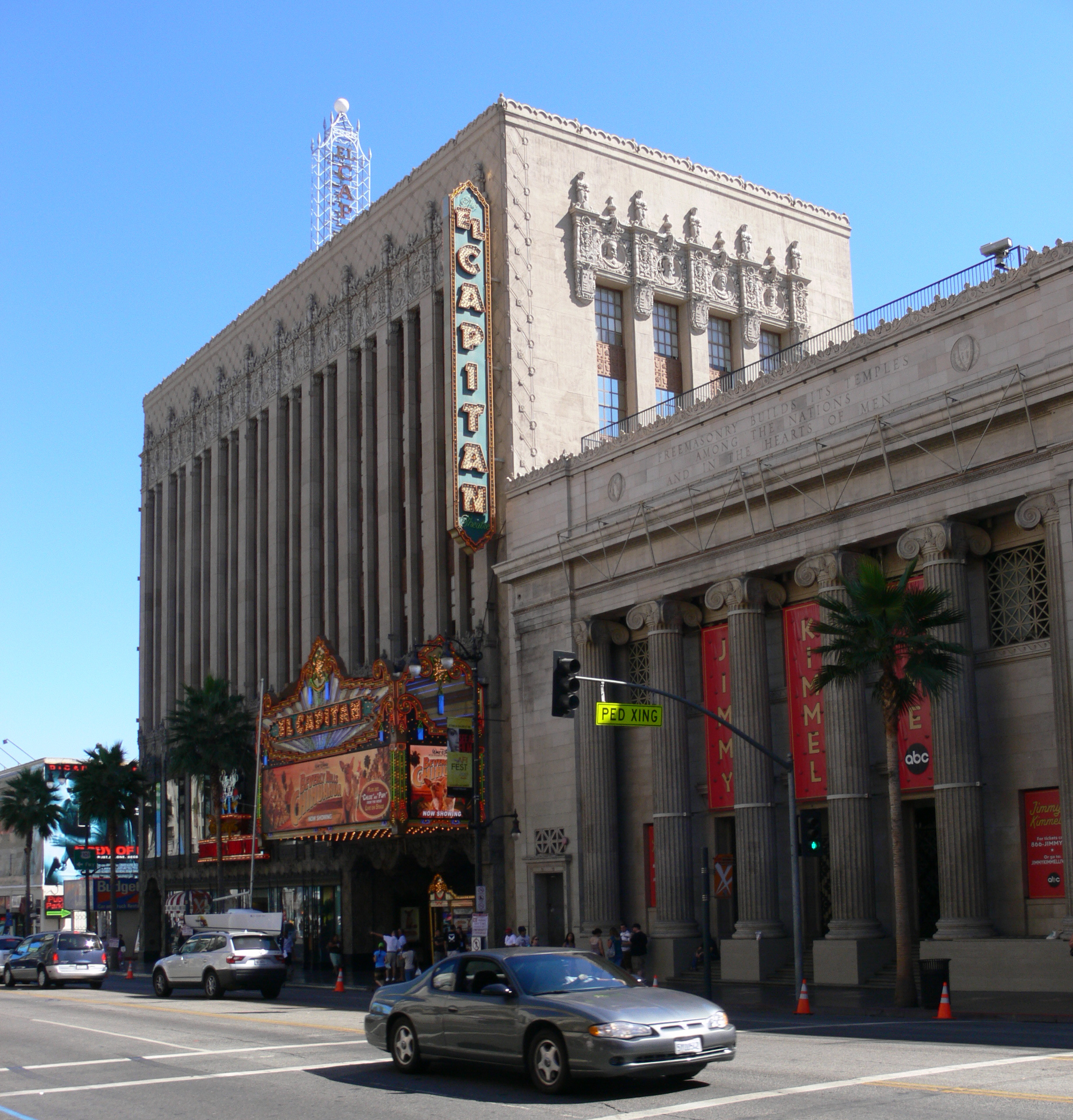
The El Capitan Theatre

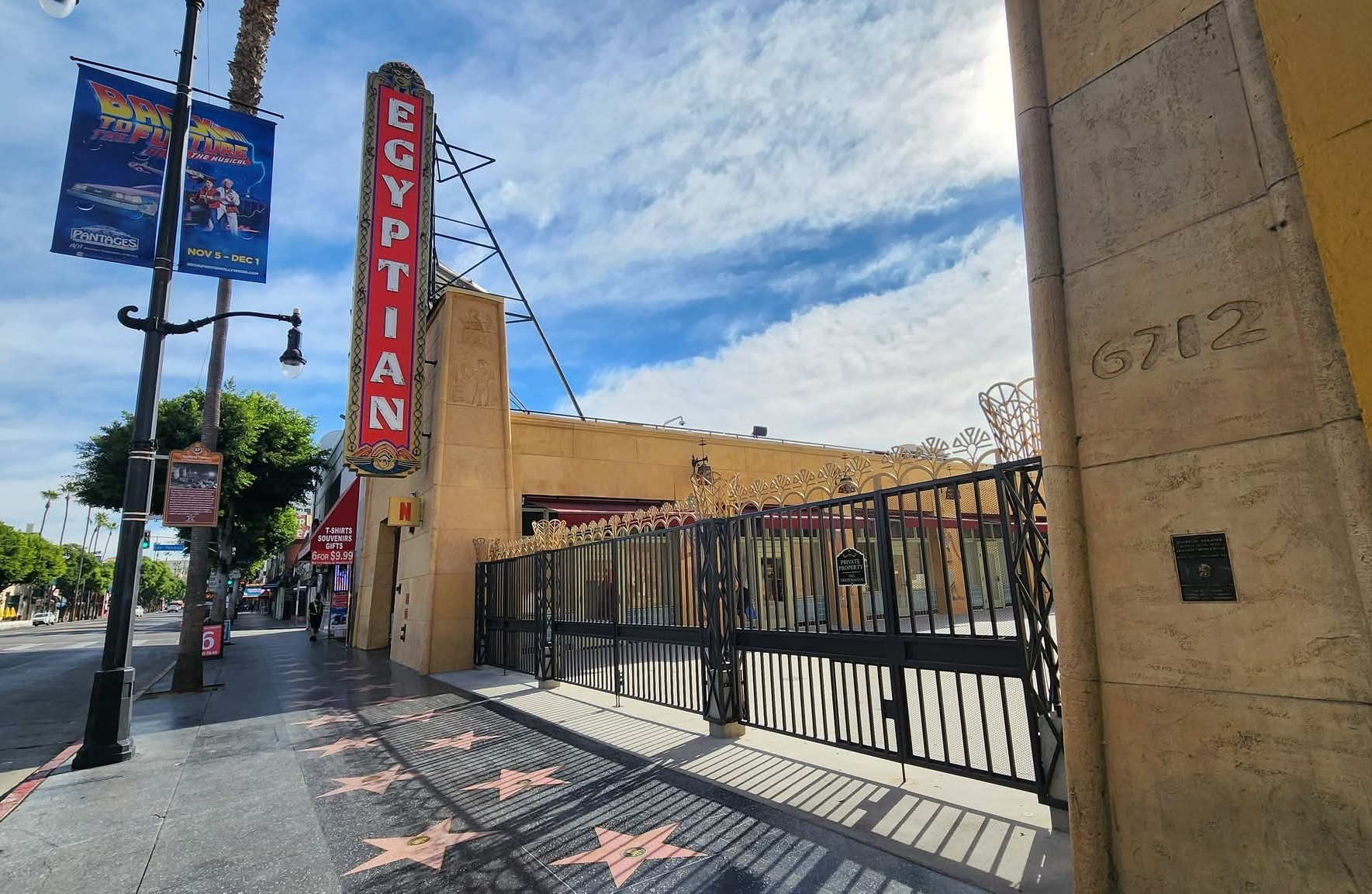
Grauman's Egyptian Theatre, 2024.

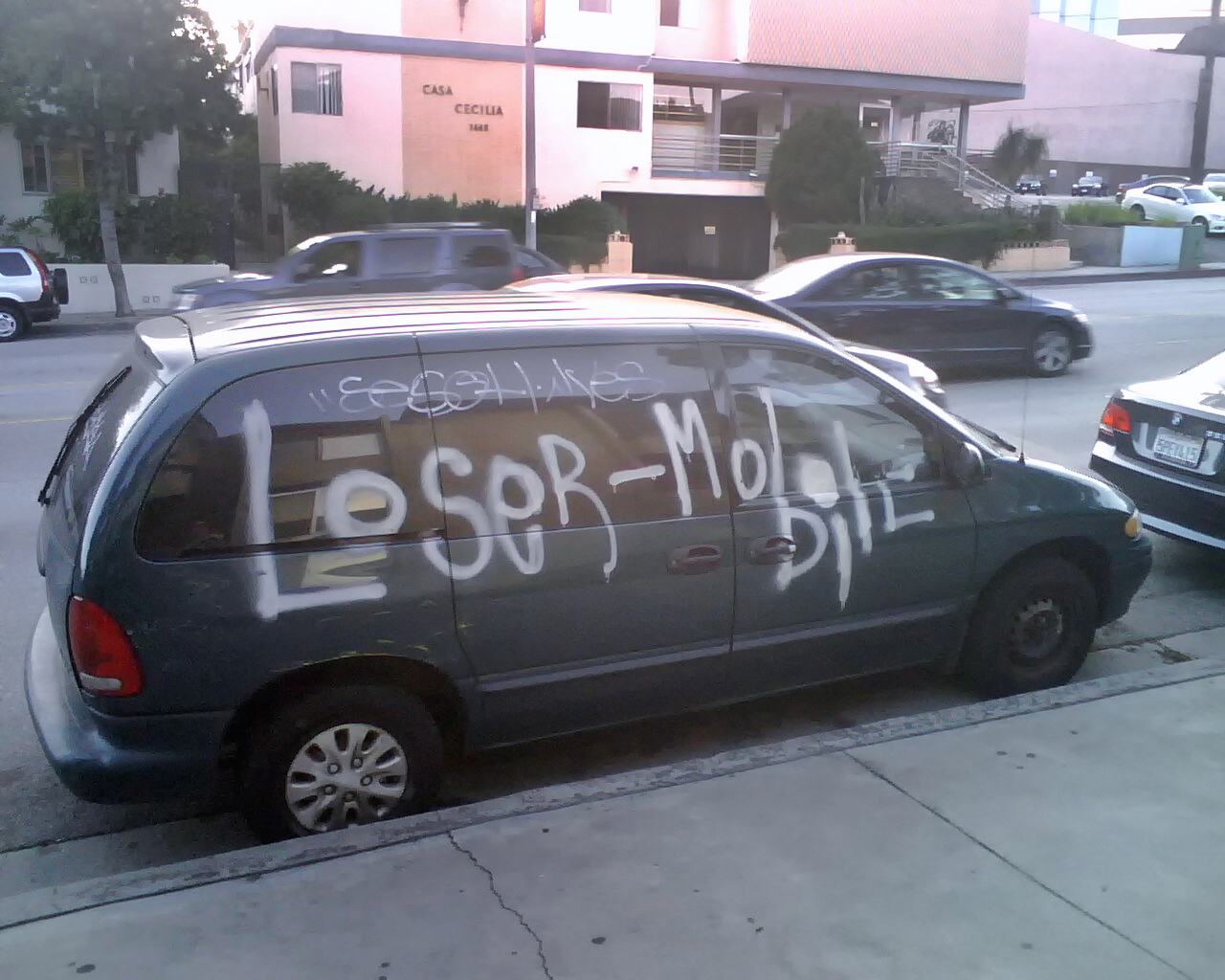
Vehicle vandalism on Fairfax near Sunset

== See also ==
- Bibliography of Hollywood
- Bibliography of Los Angeles
- Community newspapers in Hollywood
- Documentary films about Hollywood
- Films about Hollywood
- List of Hollywood novels
- List of Los Angeles Historic-Cultural Monuments in Hollywood
