= Gower Street (Los Angeles) =

Street in Los Angeles, California

Coordinates: 34.0894°N 118.322°W

- Interactive map of Gower Street
- Maintained by: Bureau of Street Services, Los Angeles Department of Water and Power
- Length: 3 miles (4.8 km)
- Location: Los Angeles, California
- South end: First Street in Hancock Park
- Major junctions: SR 2 Hollywood Boulevard; US 101 (off-ramps only)
- North end: Beachwood Canyon Drive in Beachwood Canyon

Gower Street, located in Los Angeles, California, has played an important role in the evolution of Hollywood, particularly as the home to several Poverty Row studios during the area's Golden Age. It also marks the eastern terminus of the Hollywood Walk of Fame.

== Name ==
A Hawaiian farmer named John T. Gower built his home near what would become Gower Street before his death in 1880. Upon Hollywood's annexation by the City of Los Angeles in 1910, the street was named in his honor.

== Route ==
From south to north, Gower Street begins as a residential street at 1st Street in Hancock Park. It intersections Santa Monica Boulevard/California State Route 2, then becomes primarily industrial and then commercial as it traverses Hollywood. North of Hollywood, Gower is connected via offramps to the Hollywood Freeway; the street then crosses Franklin Avenue, where it becomes residential again. Gower terminates in Beachwood Canyon at Beachwood Drive near the Hollywood Sign.

== Landmarks ==
The Hollywood Walk of Fame's eastern end is the corner of Hollywood Boulevard and Gower Street. One other Los Angeles Historic-Cultural Monument is located on Gower Street: 2494 N. Gower Street Bungalow Court. The National Register of Historic Places-listed Hollywood Tower, often cited as the inspiration for the Twilight Zone Tower of Terror attractions at several Walt Disney Parks and Resorts, abuts Gower near Franklin Avenue, an intersection that has also been cited as one of the better places to view the Hollywood Sign. Gower Street also marks the western boundary of Hollywood Forever Cemetery.

=== Movie studios ===
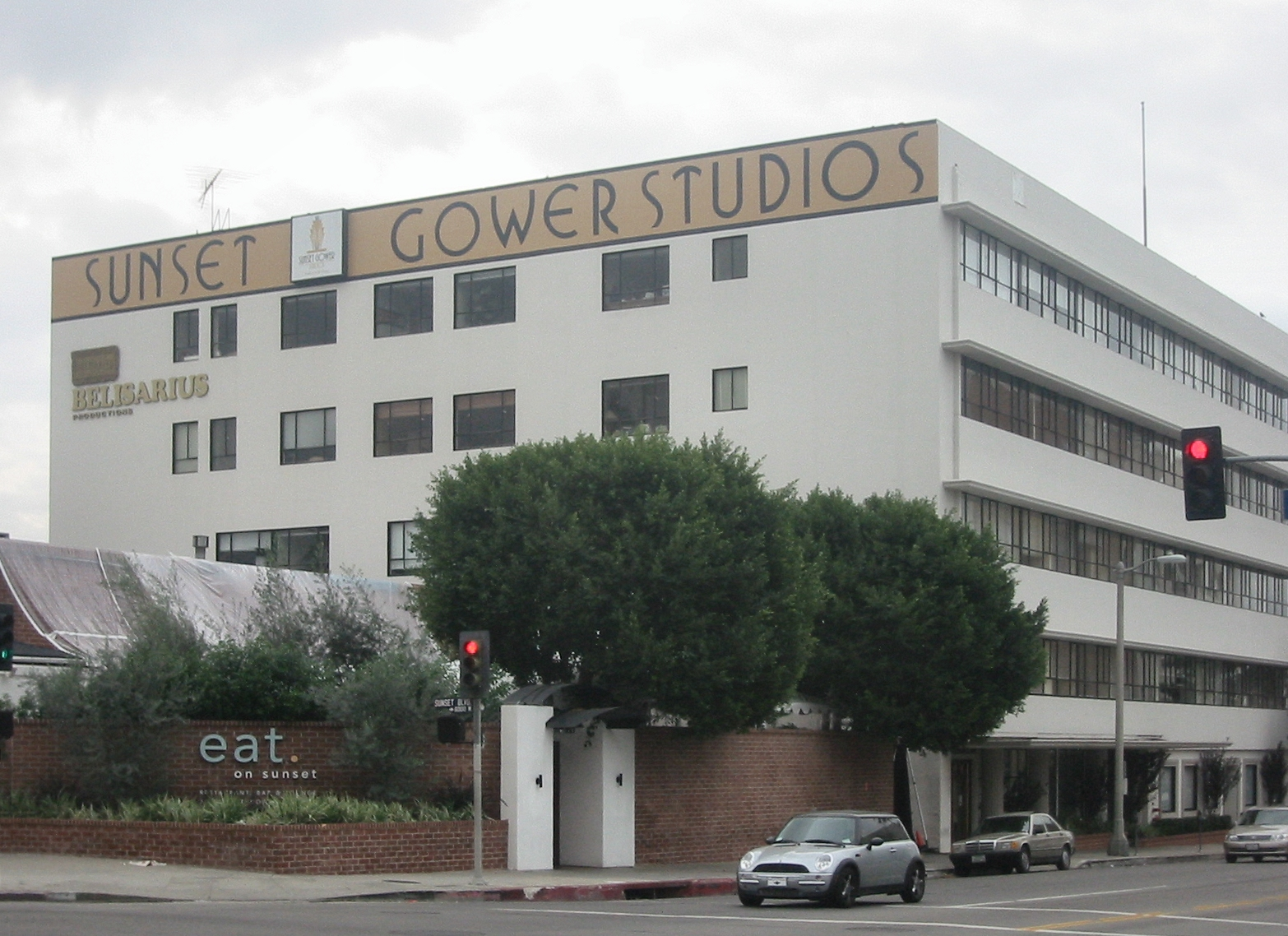
Sunset Gower Studios

Many of Hollywood's original movie studios were located on or near Gower Street. The Paramount Pictures lot is located on the corner of Gower and Melrose Avenue; further north, Sunset Gower Studios (formerly the Columbia Pictures lot) is located at Gower and Sunset Boulevard.

Gower Street was also the location of Nestor Studios, the first motion picture studio in Hollywood. Nestor Studios was operated by Al Christie in 1911, and Christie Studios occupied a building at the northwest corner of Gower and Sunset Boulevard. This location later became home to the Columbia Drugstore, which was frequented by many young movie stars. The drugstore was also home to an outdoor magazine and newspaper vendor where many celebrities bought their hometown newspapers. Columbia Broadcasting System (CBS) bought the Nestor Studios site in 1935, then demolished it and built a $2 million television facility ($47 million in 2025).

=== Gower Gulch ===
In the 1930s, Gower Street earned the nickname Gower Gulch because of the many aspiring background actors who would dress in cowboy costumes, then walk to Paramount and RKO studios, both located near Gower and Sunset Boulevard, hoping to be cast in Westerns. Today, a strip-mall named Gower Gulch sits on the southwest corner of Sunset and Gower; it was built to resemble a Western set in tribute to this previous era. The name Gower Gulch is also painted on a chuck wagon that sits on the site of an coffee shop where the cowboy actors used to have breakfast.

== In popular culture ==
Gower Street became well known to wartime audiences in the film Thank Your Lucky Stars (1943), where the characters visit Gower Gulch. However, in the film, the scene is actually a studio set built as a replica of the actual area.

Gower street was the subject of a comic song in the Looney Tunes cartoon Drip-Along Daffy (1951). The song, called "The Flower of Gower Gulch", was written by Michael Maltese and was later used in a second Looney Tunes cartoon: Nelly's Folly (1961). Gower Street was also featured in the Warren Zevon song "Desperados Under the Eaves", though it was referred to as "Gower Avenue" to preserve the meter of the song.
