= David Townsend (art director) =

American art director (1891–1935)

David W. Townsend
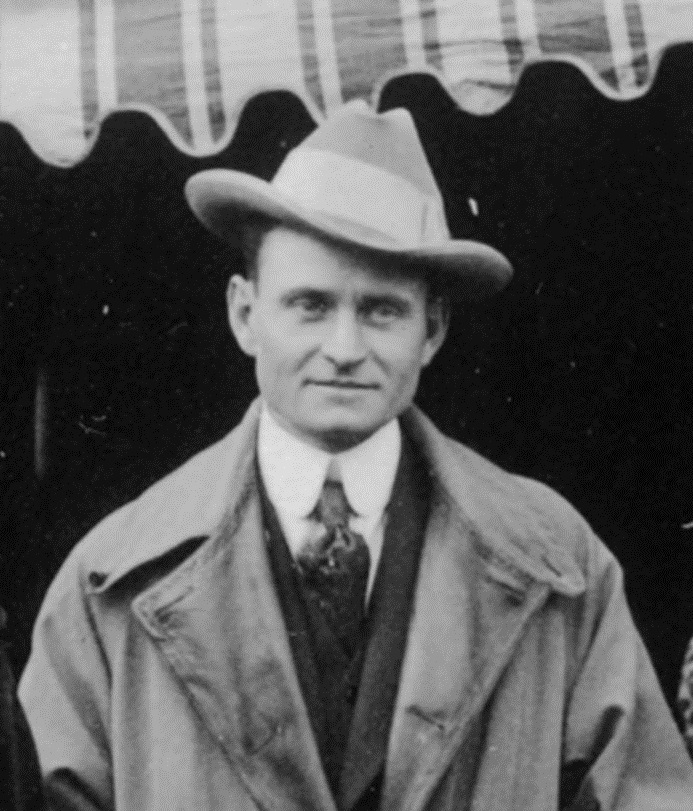
- A 1919 photo of Townsend, at the age of 28.
- Born: David Wood Townsend; November 2, 1891; Hoskins, Nebraska, U.S.
- Died: August 5, 1935 (aged 43); Sonora, California, U.S.
- Occupations: Art director, set decorator
- Years active: 1919 – 1935
- Spouse: Lillian Francis Rennick (m. 1913–1935)

David Wood Townsend (November 2, 1891 – August 5, 1935) was an American art director.

== Career ==
1919 secretary/treasurer of Otis B. Thayer's Art-O-Graf film company in Denver.
1920 sales manager of Otis B. Thayer's Art-O-Graf film company in Denver.
1921 vice president and Scenario Editor of Otis B. Thayer's Art-O-Graf film company in Denver.

From 1919 through 1921, Art-o-Graf produced the following films: "Miss Arizona (1919 Film)", "Wolves of the Street (1920 Film)", "The Desert Scorpion", "Finders Keepers (1921 Film)", and Out of the Depths (1921 Film).

In 1922, he was president of the "Mountain Plains Enterprise Film Company" in Denver. There were plans by the "Mountain Plains Enterprise Company" to build "Sunshine Studios" at Tim McCoy's Owl Creek Dude ranch in order to shoot a film titled, "The Dude Wrangler" written by Caroline Lockhart. The project was abandoned. He was also still listed as a scenario writer for the Art-O-Graf Film company.

His work with MGM:

1927 "Frisco Sally Levy" (art director), "Tillie the Toiler" (art director), "Foreign Devils (1927 film)" (art director), "Spring Fever (1927 film)" (sets), "The Bugle Call" (sets), "The Callahans and the Murphys" (sets), "Rookies (1927 film)" (sets), "Slide, Kelly, Slide" (sets), "The Taxi Dancer" (sets), "Winners of the Wilderness" (sets)
1933 "The Prizefighter and the Lady" (art director)
1934 "You Can't Buy Everything" (art director), "The Show-Off" (art director) "Death on the Diamond" (associate art director), "Hide-Out" (associate art director), "Murder in the Private Car" (associate art director), "The Thin Man (film)" (associate art director)
1935 "China Seas (film)" (associate art director), "Murder in the Fleet" (associate art director), "The Winning Ticket" (associate art director)
1936 "The Robin Hood of El Dorado" (art director)

David Townsend was contractually obligated to be listed as Associate Art Director on several films because Cedric Gibbons's contract required him to be listed as Art Director on all films at the time even when he did not serve in that capacity.

== Personal life and death ==
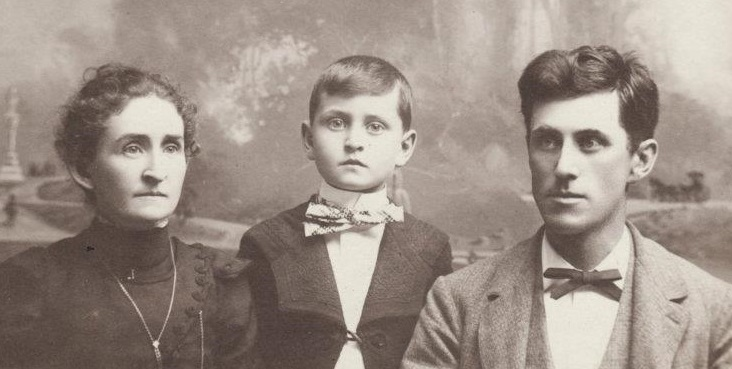
Bertha (Towberman) and Glenn Eli Townsend with son David Wood Townsend.

David Wood Townsend was born in Hoskins, Wayne County, Nebraska, the son of Glenn Eli Townsend and Bertha A. (Towberman) Townsend. Grandson of David Wood Townsend and Mary Ellen (Brown) Townsend. Great-grandson of Eli Townsend and Abigial Mosher (Wood) Townsend.
In 1910, at the age of 19, Townsend was living with his parents and grandfather whom he was named after in Dallas, South Dakota. He attended the Wayne State Normal College for Arts and Sciences. He was the Illustrator for the school paper known as the Goldenrod.
On October 4, 1913, Townsend married Lillian Francis Rennick in Chicago, Cook County, Illinois. He and Lillian had two children together, Edward Glenn Townsend and Harriet L. (Townsend) Pim Ayers.
In 1915 he was secretary/treasurer for his father's company, G. E. Construction in Norfolk, Nebraska and was still living in that area by 1917.
In 1919 he worked for the Art-O-Graf Film Company in Denver, Colorado.
In 1922 he was President of the "Mountain Plains Enterprise Film Company" in Denver.
In 1926, he moved to Los Angeles, California and began work for the Metro-Goldwyn-Mayer Studios as an art director and set designer.
On August 5, 1935 while scouting locations at Sonora Pass for the film, "The Robin Hood of El Dorado," the car he was riding in with Lowell L. Ralph, Mrs. Lottie Mundello, and Miss Agnes McMullen, went off the road and plunged 200 feet below. Townsend was killed instantly, while the other three passengers, who were thrown from the car, survived.
