= Finders Keepers (1928 film) =

1928 film

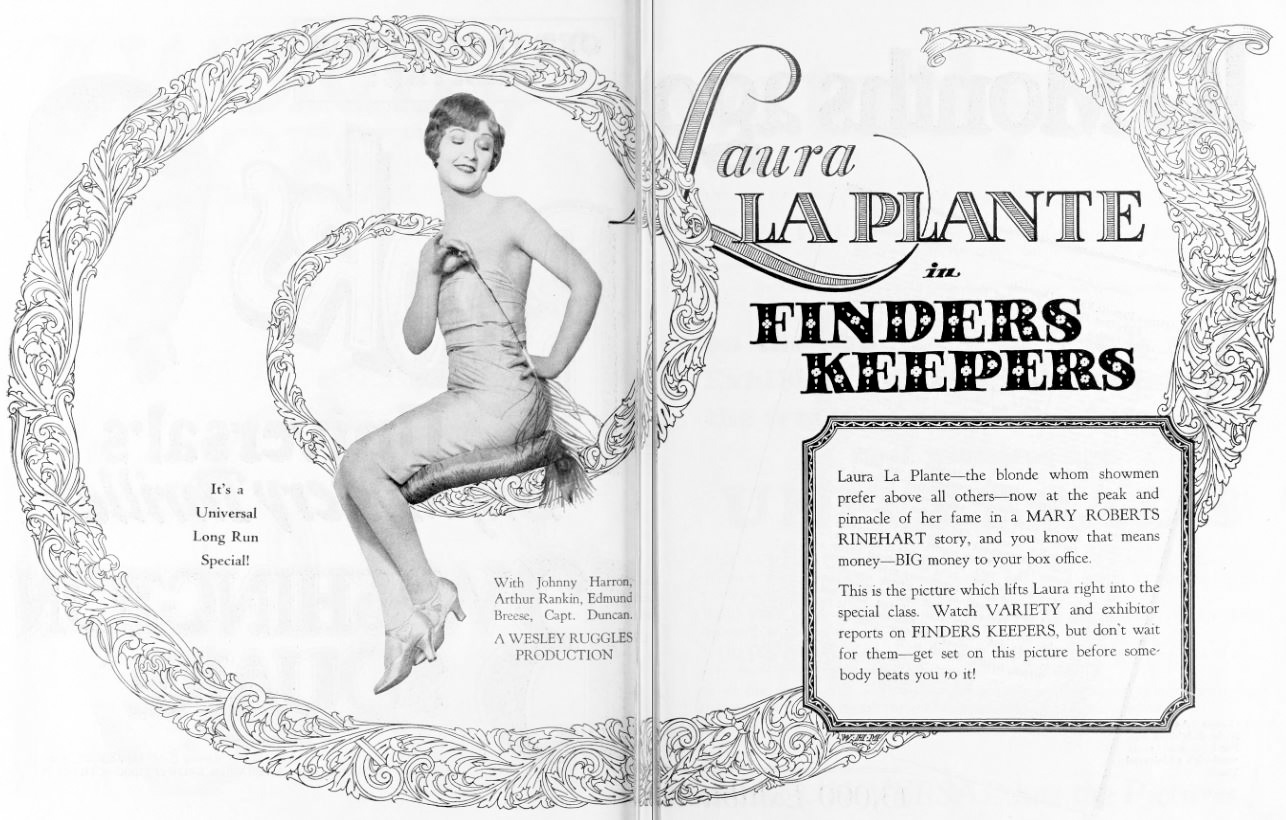
- Advertisement
- Directed by: Wesley Ruggles; Otis B. Thayer
- Written by: Robert Ames Bennett; Beatrice Van; Tom Reed (intertiles)
- Based on: "Make Them Happy" by Mary Roberts Rinehart
- Produced by: Carl Laemmle
- Starring: Laura La Plante; John Harron
- Cinematography: Virgil Miller
- Edited by: Lee Halen
- Distributed by: Universal Pictures
- Release date: March 11, 1928
- Running time: 68 minutes
- Country: United States
- Languages: Silent Version; Sound Version (Synchronized); English intertitles

Finders Keepers is an extant 1928 American silent military comedy film directed by Wesley Ruggles and Otis B. Thayer and starring Laura La Plante and John Harron. Due to the public apathy towards silent films, a sound version was prepared late in 1928. While the sound version has no audible dialog, it features a synchronized musical score with sound effects using both the sound-on-disc and sound-on-film process. It was produced and distributed by Universal Pictures. The film may or may not be a remake of a 1921 film Finders Keepers singularly directed by Thayer.

== Cast ==
- Laura La Plante as Barbara Hastings
- John Harron as Carter Brooks
- Edmund Breese as Colonel Hastings
- Eddie Phillips as 2nd Lt. Kenneth Purdy
- Arthur Rankin as Pvt. Blondy Jones
- Jack Oakie as B.B. Brown
- Joseph P. Mack as Chaplain
- Edgar Dearing as Seargeant
- William Gorman as Bozo
- S. May Stone as Mrs. Satterlee

unbilled

- Andy Devine as Doughboy / Gate Guard
- Richard "Skeets" Gallagher as Soldier who pursues Blondy

== Music ==
The sound version featured a theme song entitled “Finders Keepers (Losers Weepers)” by Paul Corbel and Merton H. Bories.

== Preservation ==
This silent version of the film is preserved in The Library of Congress from elements preserved and prepared by Universal. Its trailer also exists in the Library of Congress.
