= Gertrude Bondhill =

American stage and film actress

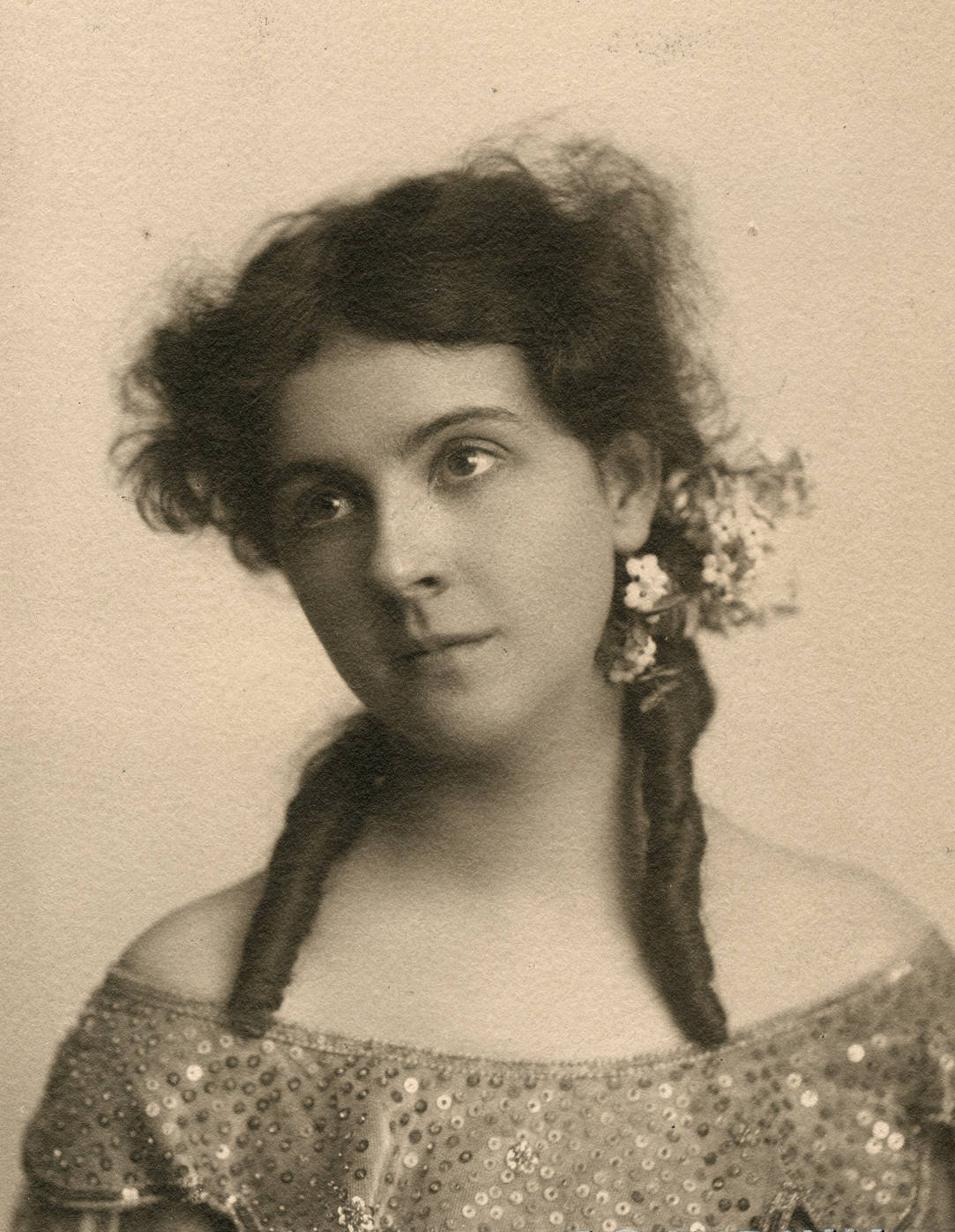
- Born: December 7, 1879; Cincinnati, Ohio
- Died: September 15, 1960 (aged 80); Chicago, Illinois
- Occupation: actress

Gertrude Bodhill (December 12, 1879 - September 15, 1960) was an American stage and film actress. She is best known for her silent film collaborations with director Otis B. Thayer, which included Miss Arizona (1919) and The Awakening of Bess Morton (1916).

== Biography ==
Before 1912, Bondhill was a performer with the Poli Players, a theatre troupe in Washington, D.C.

President Woodrow Wilson wrote to Bondhill personally in 1913 to praise her performance as Salomey Jane.

In 1935, Bondhill originated the role of Grace Richards in the play Mulatto by Langston Hughes.

== Filmography ==
=== Feature films ===
- The Sins That Ye Sin (1916)
- The Awakening of Bess Morton (1916) as Bess Morton
- The Unborn (1916) as Nancy Lee
- Miss Arizona (1919) as Arizona Farnley

=== Short films ===
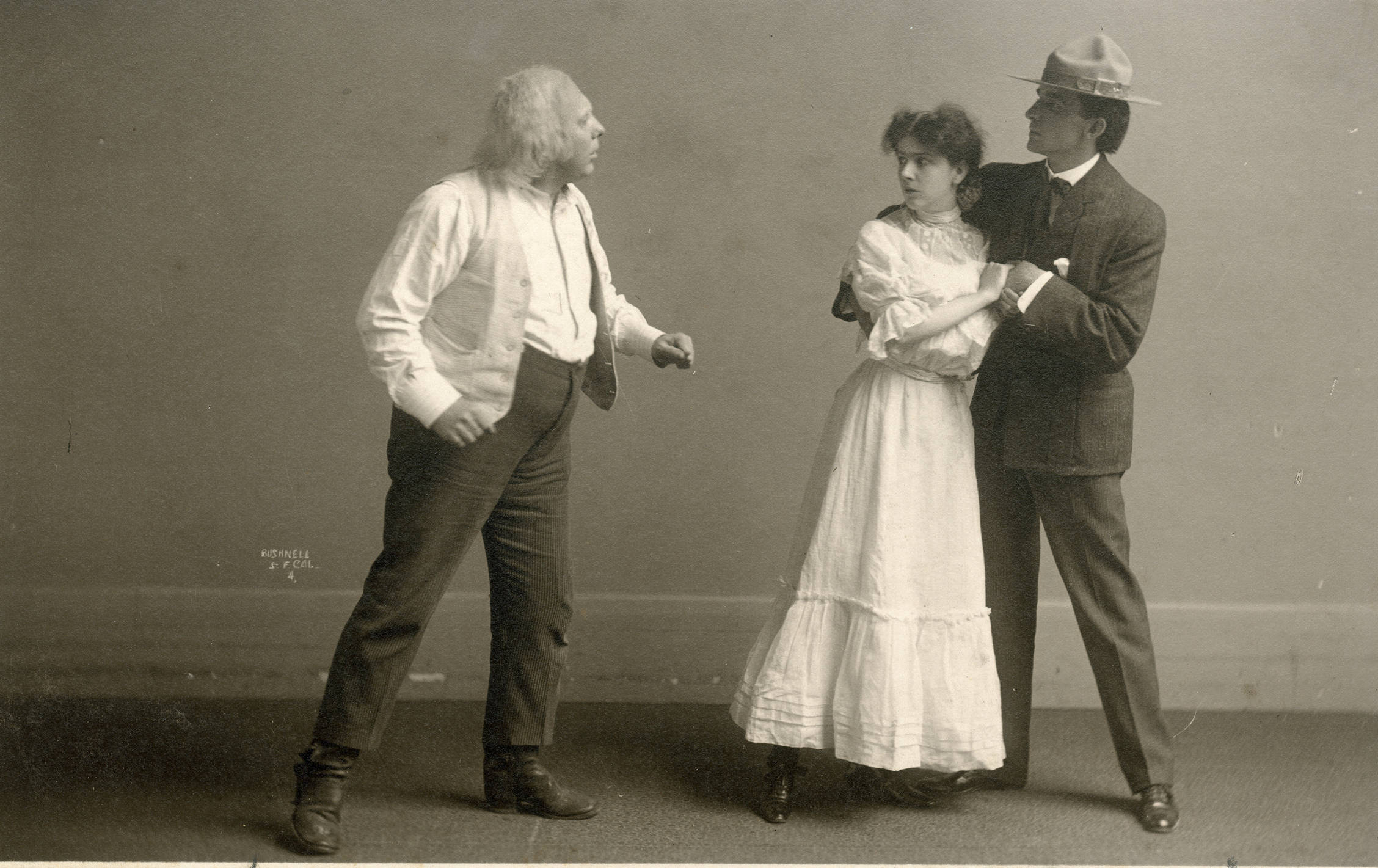
Bondhill (center) in a scene from "Sweet Clover" with Otis Thayer (left)

- The Visiting Nurse (1911)
- The New Editor (1911)
- Two Lives (1911)
- The Warrant (1911) as Nell
- The Grey Wolves (1911) as Leona Manley
- Love's Probation (1915) as Myrtle Colwell
- Love's Old Sweet Song (1915) as Stella
- Hilary of the Hills (1915) as Hilary

== Stage performances ==
- Mulatto (1935) as Grace Richards (original)
- St Elmo (1922)
- The Sweetest Girl in Dixie (1922)
- Sweet Clover (1904)
