= Riders of the Range =

Riders of the Range may refer to:

- Riders of the Range, a 1923 silent Western film
- Riders of the Range, a 1949 Western film
