= Courtney Ryley Cooper =

American screenwriter

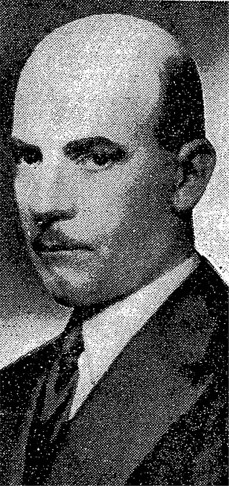
- Courtney Ryley Cooper, c. 1930
- Born: October 31, 1886; Kansas City, Missouri, United States
- Died: September 29, 1940 (aged 53); New York City, United States
- Occupation: Writer
- Known for: Books on crime and work with Frank Buck on Wild Cargo
- Spouse: Genevieve R. Furey

Courtney Ryley Cooper (October 31, 1886 – September 29, 1940) was an American circus performer, publicist and writer. During his career he published over 30 books, many focusing on crime; J. Edgar Hoover considered him at one time "the best informed man on crime in the U. S." He was also an expert on circuses, and was the chief publicist for Ringling Brothers, Barnum & Bailey Circus at the time of his death.

== Life and career ==
Courtney Ryley Cooper was born in Kansas City, Missouri, on October 31, 1886. At the age of 16, he left home to join a traveling circus and eventually became a circus clown, working his way up to general manager of the circus.

Later, he worked as a newspaper reporter for The Kansas City Star, New York World, the Chicago Tribune and the Denver Post. In 1914, as a result of his work at the Post, he became the press agent for the Sells-Floto Circus, which was owned by the owners of the Post. The Sells-Floto had absorbed the assets of William "Buffalo Bill" Cody's Wild West Show, including Buffalo Bill himself.

On August 1, 1918, Cooper joined the United States Marine Corps. He rose to the rank of second lieutenant and was sent to France to conduct historical research on the Marines.

In the 1920s and 1930s, Cooper wrote screenplays, including the narrative for the Frank Buck film Wild Cargo and the Art-O-Graf film Riders of the Range, short stories, novels, magazine articles, and popular non-fiction books. He published 30 books during his career. Most of his non-fiction work focused on two subjects — the circus and crime. He was Annie Oakley's first biographer. His books Here's to Crime (1937), Ten-Thousand Public Enemies (1935) and Designs in Scarlet (1939) championed the cause of the young Federal Bureau of Investigation and made the case that corrupt local governments and police forces permitted lawlessness to flourish in many parts of the United States.

Cooper's work was much admired by FBI Director J. Edgar Hoover, who once said he is "the best informed man on crime in the U. S." — even allowing Cooper access to FBI case files. Cooper is widely believed to have ghostwritten the book Persons in Hiding (1938) as well as a number of magazine articles for Hoover. A 1936 newspaper article in the Chicago Daily Tribune identified Cooper as one of Hoover's few close personal friends, along with Clyde Tolson and a man named Frank Baughman. The article goes on to state that after Ten Thousand Public Enemies came out in 1935, Cooper "was rewarded with a propaganda post in the department of justice, with the express function of publicizing the division of investigation."

In 1934, Cooper began writing scripts for The Gibson Family on NBC radio. The show was an effort "to bring an original musical to the air every week." He left the program in May 1935, when the sponsor revised the format in a cost-cutting effort.

In 1940, Cooper worked with comic strip artist Dale Messick, and suggested the first storyline for Messick's Brenda Starr, Reporter.

Cooper wrote extensively on the danger of illicit drugs, particularly marijuana. He collaborated with Federal Bureau of Narcotics Director Harry Anslinger on the article "Marijuana, Assassin of Youth", which originally appeared in The American Magazine in July 1937.

Some of Cooper's correspondence with Hoover is archived at the University of Alaska Anchorage Library.

== Death ==
On September 29, 1940, Cooper committed suicide by hanging himself in the closet of a hotel room in the Park Central Hotel in New York City. He left a note instructing that the cash in his clothing should be used to settle his hotel bill but giving no indication as to a motivation for his suicide. In his FBI file, there are letters to Hoover from two associates stating that Cooper did not commit suicide but was murdered.

Mrs. Cooper, of Los Angeles, could advance no reason for his suicide, but told police he had been morose over alleged snubs he had received in Washington when he sought to inform officials of German activities he said he discovered in Mexico. Finally, she said, he had conferred with his close friend and writing collaborator, J. Edgar Hoover, director of the FBI, but she did not know the result of their conferences. Mrs. Cooper said her husband had made an exhaustive investigation in Mexico several months earlier and unearthed details of German conditions and propaganda there.
