= The Lure (1914 film) =

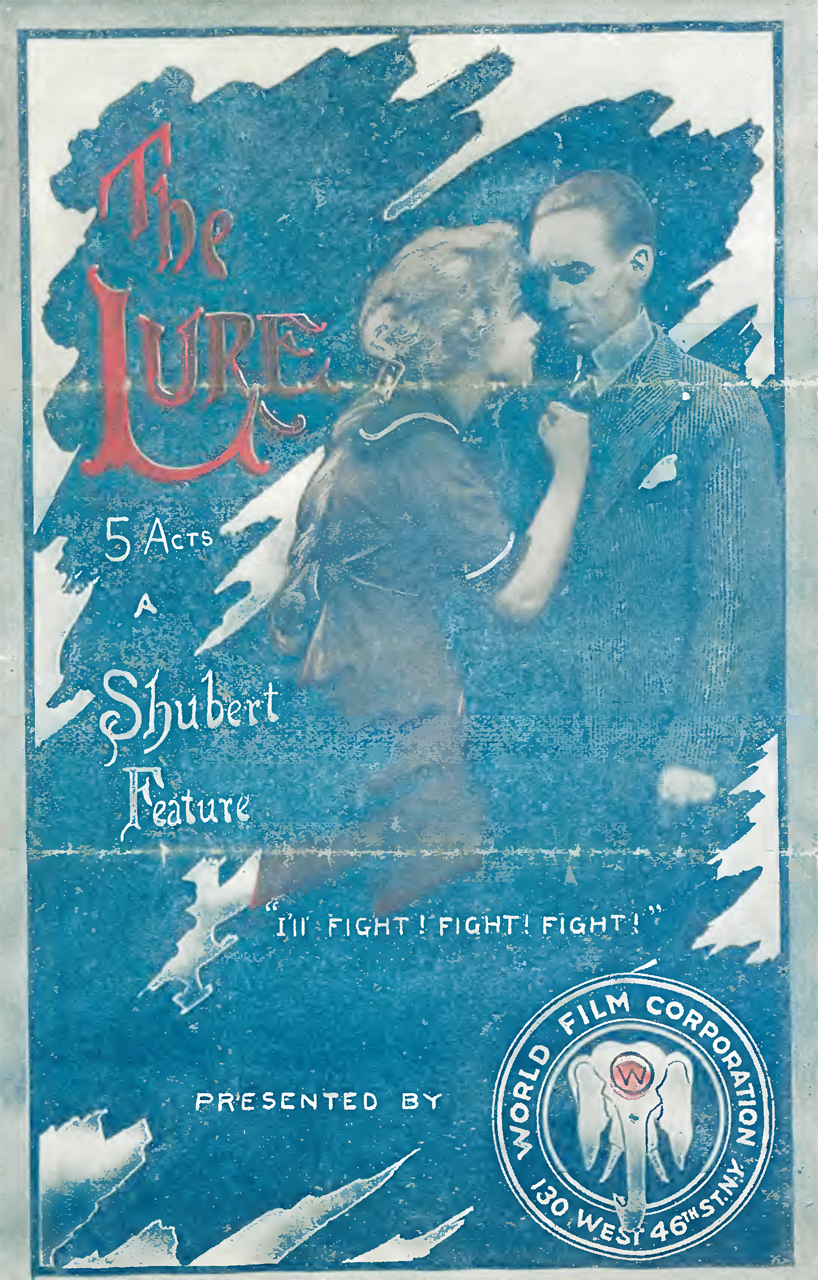
- Directed by: Alice Guy Blaché
- Written by: Alice Guy Blaché
- Based on: The Lure by George Scarborough
- Starring: Claire Whitney; James O'Neill
- Production company: Solax Studios
- Distributed by: World Film Corporation
- Release date: 1914
- Country: United States
- Language: Silent (English intertitles)

The Lure is a 1914 American silent drama film directed by Alice Guy Blaché starring James O'Neill, Fraunie Fraunholz, Kirah Markham, and Claire Whitney. The Lure was an adaptation of a controversial play by George Scarborough that gives a sympathetic depiction of social pressures leading women into prostitution.

== Cast ==
- James O'Neill
- Fraunie Fraunholz (credited as Fraunie Fraunholtz)
- Kirah Markham
- Claire Whitney
- Wallace Scott
- Bernard Daly
- Lola May
- Lucia Moore

== Preservation ==
With no copies of The Lure listed in any film archives, it is a lost film.
