= The Mad Racer =

1926 short film

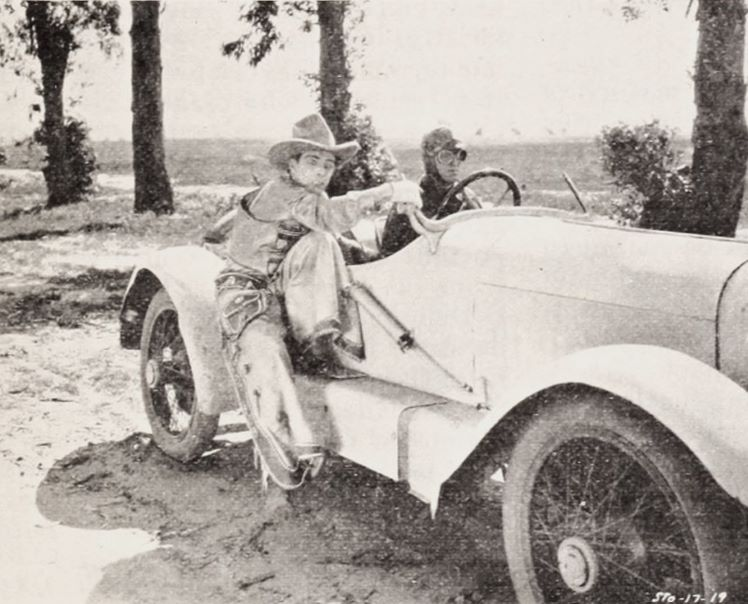
- Film still
- Directed by: Benjamin Stoloff
- Written by: Richard Harding Davis (story)
- Starring: Earle Foxe; Florence Gilbert; Frank Beal
- Distributed by: Fox Film Corporation
- Release date: 1926
- Running time: 19 minutes
- Country: United States
- Language: Silent (English intertitles)

The Mad Racer was a 1926 American short silent comedy film directed by Philadelphian director Benjamin Stoloff. The film starred Earle Foxe and Florence Gilbert.

== Plot ==
As described in a film magazine review, Reginald Van Bibber is spending a vacation with Colonel Paddock's party at a ranch owned by a friend of the Colonel's. The peace of the ranch is occasionally disturbed by a desperado known as the Mad Racer, the terror of the countryside. The ranch foreman hires the Mad Racer to dispose of Van Bibber so that the foreman can win the annual buggy race and win over Sylvia Paddock, with whom he is infatuated. However, by a twist of fate, Van Bibber is forced into the race. After being dragged by a runaway vehicle, he stumbles into the leading chariot in which the Mad Racer lies stunned. Once again, Van Bibber is proclaimed hero of the day.

== Cast ==
- Earle Foxe as Reginald Van Bibber
- Florence Gilbert as Sylvia Paddock
- Frank Beal as Colonel Paddock
- Jean Arthur
- Jere Austin
- Frank Cooley
- Lynn Cowan as Bertie de Puyster
- Lawford Davidson as The Heavey
- Edna Marion
- Patrick Rooney as The Mad Racer
