= Oliver Twist (1912 American film) =

1912 silent feature film drama produced by the General Film Company

- Written by: Charles Dickens (novel)
- Based on: Oliver Twist; 1837 novel by Charles Dickens
- Produced by: General Film Company; H. A. Spanuth
- Starring: Nat C. Goodwin
- Distributed by: State Rights
- Release date: May 20, 1912
- Running time: 5 reels
- Country: United States

Oliver Twist is a 1912 silent feature film drama based on Charles Dickens' classic 1838 novel Oliver Twist. This film is the first feature version of the story followed by a later British film released in October 1912. Nat C. Goodwin, a distinguished comedian from the Broadway stage, stars. The General Film Company, usually a distributor, produced this film and it was released on State Rights basis.

A print survives in the Library of Congress collection.

== Cast ==
- Nat C. Goodwin - Fagin
- Vinnie Burns - Oliver Twist
- Charles Rogers - Artful Dodger
- Mortimer Martine - Bill Sikes
- Beatrice Moreland - Nancy
- Edwin McKim - Monks
- Daniel Read - Bates
- Hudson Liston - Mr. Brownlow
- Frank Kendrick - Mr. Grimwig
- Stuart Holmes - Bumble, the Beadle
- Lillian DeLesque - Rose
- Mrs. Liston - Mrs. Maylie
- Will Scherer - Giles
- Frank Stafford - Brittles
- Louise White - Agnes Fleming
- Jack Hopkins - Charles Leeford
- Agnes Stone - Nurse

== See also ==
- Oliver Twist (1909)
- Oliver Twist (1912)
- Oliver Twist (1916)
- Oliver Twist (1919)
- Oliver Twist (1922)
- Oliver Twist (1933)
