= Wolves of the Street =

1920 film

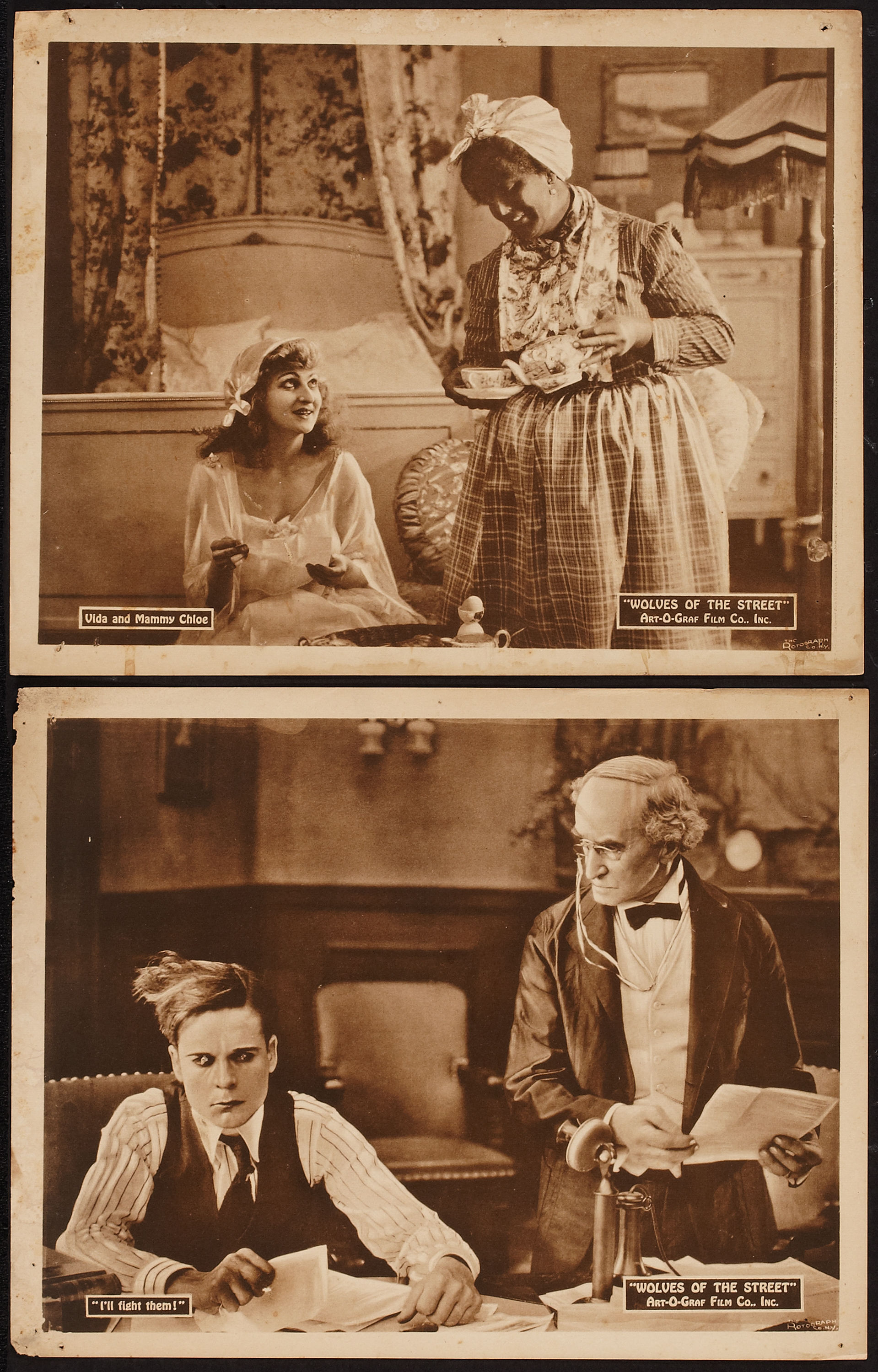
- Lobby cards
- Directed by: Otis B. Thayer
- Story by: Tom Gibson
- Starring: Edmund Cobb; Vida Johnson
- Production company: Art-O-Graf Film Company
- Distributed by: Arrow Film Corporation
- Release date: February 1, 1920
- Running time: 60 minutes
- Country: United States
- Languages: Silent; English intertitles

Wolves of the Street (also known as The Wolves of Wall Street or Wolves in Wall Street) is a 1920 American silent drama film directed by Otis B. Thayer and starring Edmund Cobb and Vida Johnson. The film was shot in Steamboat Springs, Colorado by the Thayer's Art-O-Graf film company. Franklyn Farnum was originally cast for the lead role, but he did not appear in the completed film.

== Plot ==
James Trevlyn's father, who is battling profiteers working to corner the wheat market, is murdered. James leaves his mine work out west to pick up where his father left off on wall Street. The profiteers foment a Bolshevist strike at Trevlyn's mines in his absence. Eleanor locates a James Trevlyn look-alike at a mission house who takes his place on Wall Street to allow the real James to travel back west to take control of the mines. James is kidnapped and his look-alike is bribed and changes sides. James is mistaken for a wanted murderer and has to re-establish his identity.

== Cast ==
- Edmund Cobb as James Trevlyn / Denver Devers (as Edmund F. Cobb)
- Vida Johnson as Eleanor Fernwood
- Gretchen Wood
- Zelma Edwards
- Frank Gallager
- A. E. McCormick
- Dave Campbell
- Babe Courvoisier
- Fred Shafer
- Lewis Milner
- Tom Gibson as an extra
- unknown as Mammy Chloe

== Crew ==
- Otis B. Thayer Managing Director
- Vernon L. Walker Head Cameraman
- H. Haller Murphy Cameraman
