= Vinnie Burns =

American actress (1897-1969)

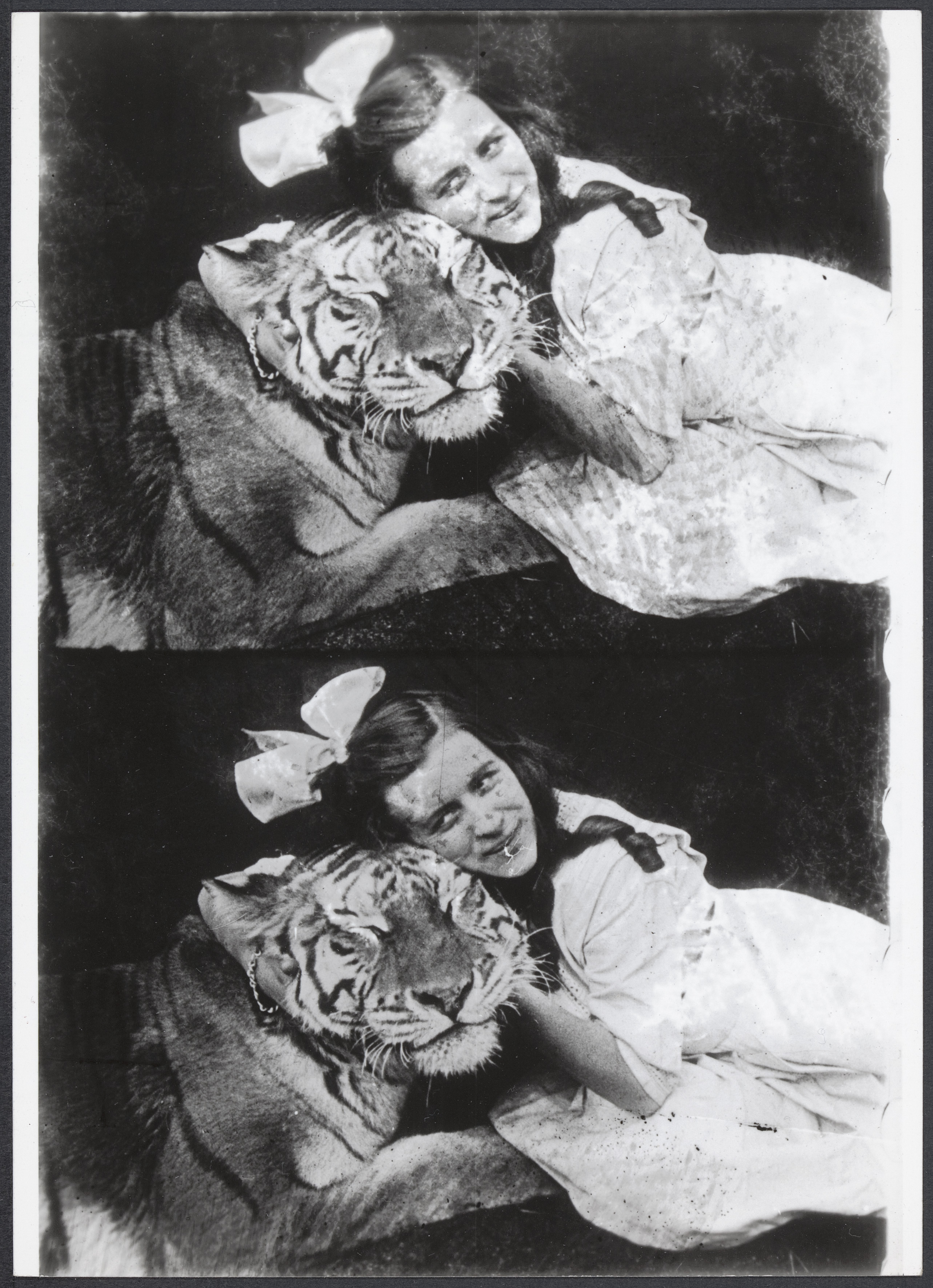
Still from The Beasts of the Jungle

Vinnie Burns (June 1, 1897 - August 3, 1969) was an American stage and film actress.

She started her career as a stage actress in Ben Hur at the age of 5.In 1906 she was in a theatrical performance of A Midsummer Night's Dream as Moth. Around 1911 she joined Solax Film Company. She starred in Alice Guy films. In 1912 she portrayed Oliver Twist in the first ever film adaptation of the Charles Dickens' book. The film is extant.

Although her birth name was Vinnie Burns, she was credited as June Daye beginning in 1915. However, she reverted back to her birth name by 1919.

The Exhibitors' Times noted her fearlessness.

== Filmography ==
- Oliver Twist (1912) as Oliver Twist
- The Beasts of the Jungle (1913)
- Dick Whittington and His Cat (1913) an adaptation of the folktale Dick Whittington and His Cat
- The Temptations of Satan (1914) as Everygirl
- The Mystery of Edwin Drood (1914), as Rosa Budd, an adaptation of The Mystery of Edwin Drood
- Heartaches (1915)
- From Champion to Tramp (1915)
- Love and Bullets (1916) as Louisa Gunn/June Daye
- The Heart's Tribute (1916)
- The Derelict (1917)
- Uncle John's Money (1917)
- Trooper 44 as Ruth Moreland
- Wild Honey (1918) as Trixianita
- His Model Day (1921) as June Day
- The Rich Slave (1921)
