= Cupid's Rustler =

1924 film

- Directed by: Francis Ford
- Written by: Francis Ford
- Starring: Edmund Cobb; Florence Gilbert; Janet Gaynor
- Production company: Ashton Dearholt Productions
- Distributed by: Arrow Film Corporation
- Release date: June 1, 1924
- Running time: 50 minutes
- Country: United States
- Languages: Silent; English intertitles

Cupid's Rustler is a lost 1924 American silent Western film directed by Francis Ford and starring Edmund Cobb and Florence Gilbert. It also featured an early appearance by the future star Janet Gaynor.

== Cast ==
- Edmund Cobb as Victim of a Crooked Card Game
- Florence Gilbert as Another Victim of Circumstances
- Clark B. Coffey as The Sheriff
- Ashton Dearholt as Harry
- Wilbur McGaugh as Foreman
- Janet Gaynor

== Preservation ==
With no holdings located in archives, Cupid's Rustler is considered a lost film.
