= Hills of Missing Men =

1922 film directed by J. P. McGowan

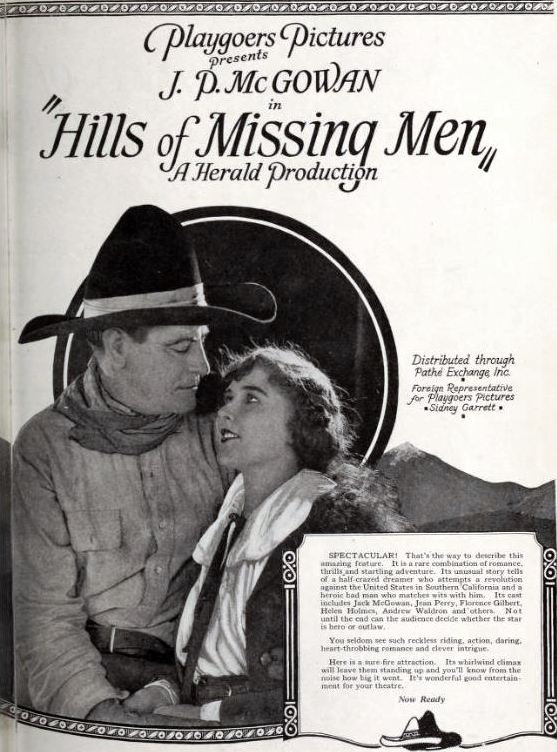
- Directed by: J.P. McGowan
- Written by: John B. Clymer; J.P. McGowan
- Starring: J.P. McGowan; Florence Gilbert; Helen Holmes
- Cinematography: Ben Bail
- Production company: Playgoers Pictures
- Distributed by: Associated Exhibitors
- Release date: February 26, 1922
- Running time: 50 minutes
- Country: United States
- Languages: Silent; English intertitles

Hills of Missing Men is a 1922 American silent adventure film directed by J.P. McGowan and starring McGowan, Florence Gilbert and Helen Holmes.

== Plot ==
An American army officer goes undercover in Baja California to battle against a powerful magnate allied with a local bandit.

== Cast ==
- J.P. McGowan as Capt. Brandt / The Dragon
- Jean Perry as Crando
- James Wang as Li Fung
- Charles Brinley as Bandini
- Andrew Waldron as Buck Allis
- Florence Gilbert as Hilma Allis
- Helen Holmes as Amy Allis

== Bibliography ==
- Munden, Kenneth White. The American Film Institute Catalog of Motion Pictures Produced in the United States, Part 1. University of California Press, 1997.
