= Edmund Cobb =

American actor (1892–1974)

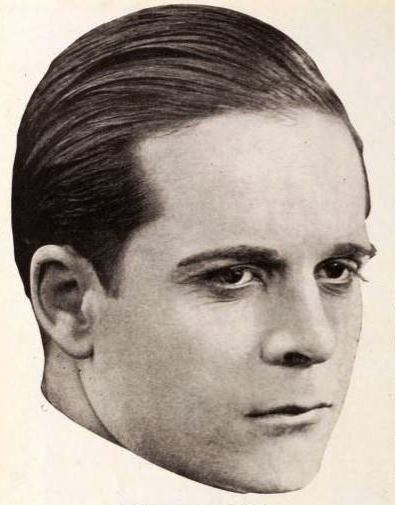
- Cobb in 1920
- Born: Edmund Fessenden Cobb; June 23, 1892; Albuquerque, New Mexico, U.S.
- Died: August 15, 1974 (aged 82); Woodland Hills, Los Angeles, U.S.
- Occupation: Actor
- Years active: 1912–1966
- Spouses: Helen Hayes (m. 1914; div. 1925) Vivian Marie Winter (div. 1974)

Edmund Fessenden Cobb (June 23, 1892 – August 15, 1974) was an American actor who appeared in more than 620 films between 1912 and 1966.

== Biography ==
Cobb was born in Albuquerque, New Mexico, the son of William Henry Cobb and Eddie (Edmundie) Ross. His maternal grandfather, Edmund G. Ross, was a newspaper editor, a governor of the New Mexico territory, a senator from Kansas, and a leader in the abolitionist movement in the United States.

Despite his grandfather's efforts to lead Cobb into a career in politics, an initial effort in acting in a locally produced play turned him in that direction for a career. When he was 18, he worked for the St. Louis Motion Picture Company when it made a film in Albuquerque. Other roles with other companies followed. One of his earliest roles was a bit part in the Essanay Studios film A Pueblo Legend (1912).

Much of Cobb's work in films came after he signed with Universal in 1925. He continued to act after sound came into films, but in less prominent roles. His 64 serials were more than those of any other actor.

Cobb died in Woodland Hills, Los Angeles, in 1974 from a heart attack.

== Partial filmography ==
- The Circle's End (1914)
- Captain Jinks of the Horse Marines (1916)
- The Strange Case of Mary Page (1916)
- Moral Courage (1917)
- The Deciding Kiss (1918)
- Social Briars (1918)
- The Desert Scorpion (1920)
- Wolves of the Street (1920)
- Out of the Depths (1921)
- Finders Keepers (1921)
- The Miracle Baby (1923)
- At Devil's Gorge (1923)
- The Law Rustlers (1923)
- Battling Bates (1923)
- Playing It Wild (1923)
- Riders of the Range (1923)
- Cupid's Rustler (1924)
- Western Yesterdays (1924)
- The Burning Trail (1925)
- The Terror (1926)
- The Galloping Cowboy (1926)
- The Man from Oklahoma (1926)
- Fighting with Buffalo Bill (1926)
- Looking for Trouble (1926)
- General Custer at the Little Big Horn (1926)
- Wolf's Trail (1927)
- A Final Reckoning (1928)
- Young Whirlwind (1928)
- The Fightin' Redhead (1928)
- Breed of the West (1930)
- Beyond the Rio Grande (1930)
- Dames Ahoy! (1930)
- Wild Horse (1931)
- Branded Men (1931)
- Trapped (1931)
- Human Targets (1932)
- Tangled Fortunes (1932)
- The Lone Trail (1932)
- Between Fighting Men (1932)
- Heroes of the West (1932)
- Gun Law (1933)
- Her Forgotten Past (1933)
- The Vanishing Shadow (1934)
- The Law of the Wild (1934)
- The Prescott Kid (1934)
- The Westerner (1934)
- Bulldog Courage (1935)
- The Adventures of Rex and Rinty (1935)
- The Miracle Rider (1935)
- Arizona Bad Man (1935)
- The Cheyenne Tornado (1935)
- Rustler's Paradise (1935)
- Lightning Triggers (1935)
- Danger Trails (1935)
- Riding Wild (1935)
- Darkest Africa (1936)
- The Fugitive Sheriff (1936)
- Code of the Range (1936)
- Wild Horse Rodeo (1937) - Hank Bain
- Two Gun Law (1937)
- Outlaws of the Prairie (1937)
- Sergeant Murphy (1938)
- Squadron of Honor (1938)
- West of Cheyenne (1938)
- I'm From the City (1938)
- South of Arizona (1938)
- The Colorado Trail (1938)
- Call of the Rockies (1938)
- Law of the Plains (1938)
- The Stranger from Texas (1939)
- The Thundering West (1939)
- Zorro's Fighting Legion (1939)
- Texas Stampede (1939)
- Prairie Schooners (1940)
- The Secret Seven (1940)
- Citizen Kane (1941) - Inquirer Reporter (uncredited)
- Tonto Basin Outlaws (1941)
- Law Men (1944)
- Sweethearts of the U.S.A. (1944)
- West of the Rio Grande (1944)
- Renegades of the Rio Grande (1945)
- The Man from Oklahoma (1945)
- Rio Grande Raiders (1946)
- Galloping Thunder (1946)
- Jesse James Rides Again (1947)
- Oregon Trail Scouts (1947)
- Son of Zorro (1947)
- Hidden Danger (1948)
- The Bold Frontiersman (1948)
- Heart of Virginia (1948)
- G-Men Never Forget (1948)
- The Daring Caballero (1949)
- Gun Law Justice (1949)
- Comanche Territory (1950)
- Ma and Pa Kettle at the Fair (1952, uncredited)
- Canadian Mounties vs. Atomic Invaders (1953)
- The Amazing Colossal Man (1957)
- The Underwater City (1962, uncredited)
