= Miss Arizona (1919 film) =

1919 film

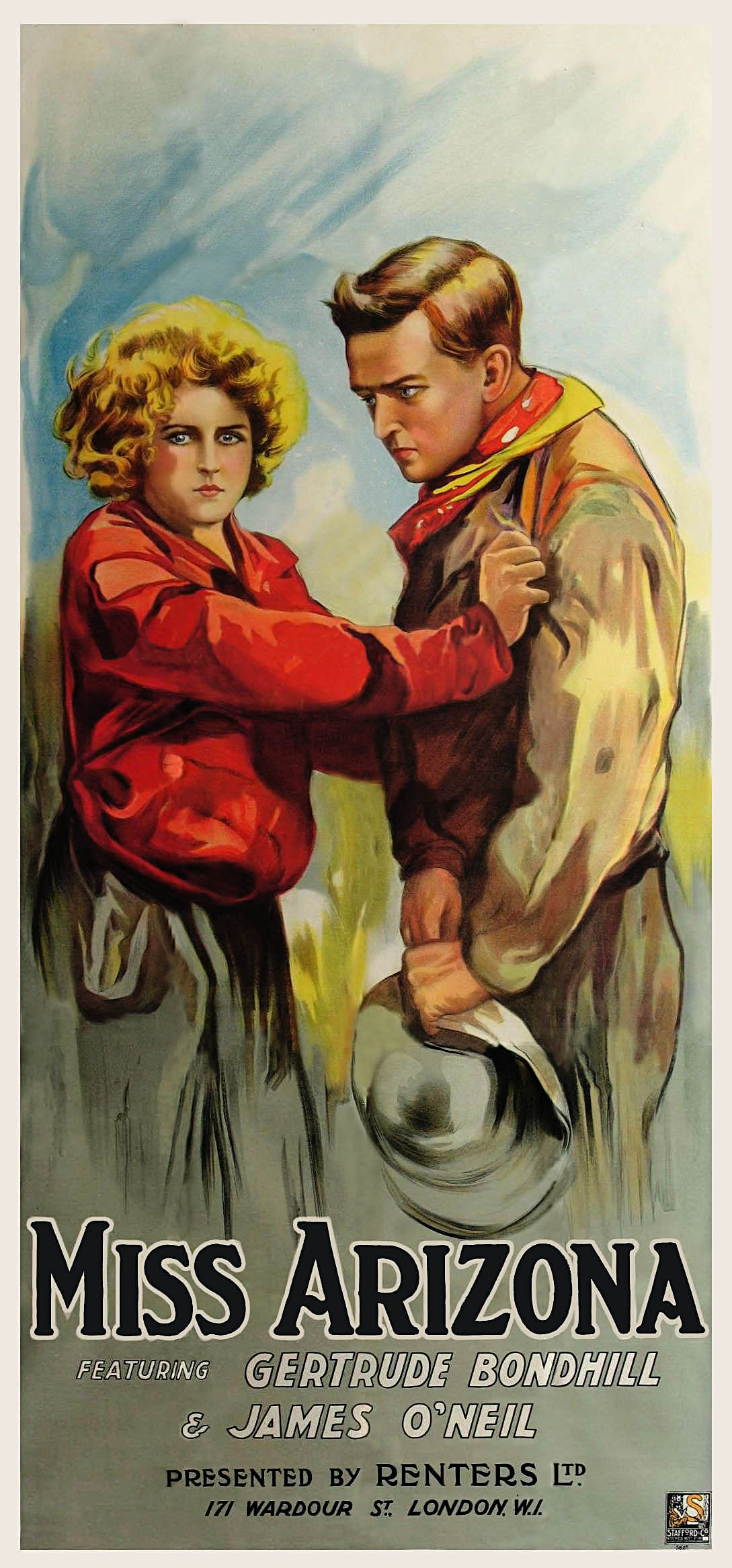
- Story by: George Elliot Jr.
- Starring: Gertrude Bondhill; James O'Neill
- Production company: Art-O-Graf
- Distributed by: Arrow Film Corporation
- Release date: March 1919
- Running time: 5 reels
- Country: United States
- Languages: Silent; English intertitles

Miss Arizona is a 1919 western silent film directed by Otis B. Thayer and starring Gertrude Bondhill and James O'Neill. The film was shot in Englewood, Colorado by Thayer's Art-O-Graf film company. There is at least one known 35mm nitro copy of this film stored at Filmarchiv Austria.

== Plot summary ==
Miss Arizona Farnley, tomboy of the West, avenges the death of her father, who was killed by Bob Evans during a bar fight at The Oasis.

== Cast ==
- Gertrude Bondhill as Miss Arizona Farnley
- James O'Neill as Will Norman

== Crew ==
- Otis B. Thayer Managing Director
- Vernon L. Walker Head Cameraman
- H. Haller Murphy Cameraman

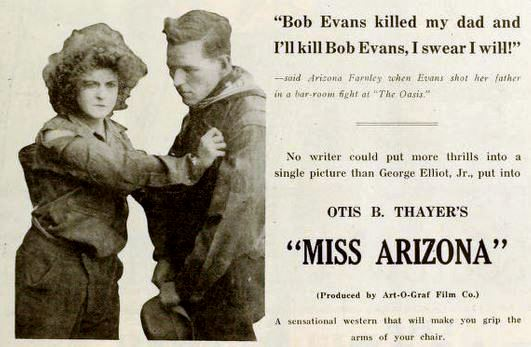
Advertisement for Miss Arizona.
