= Robin Hood of El Dorado (film) =

1936 film by William A. Wellman

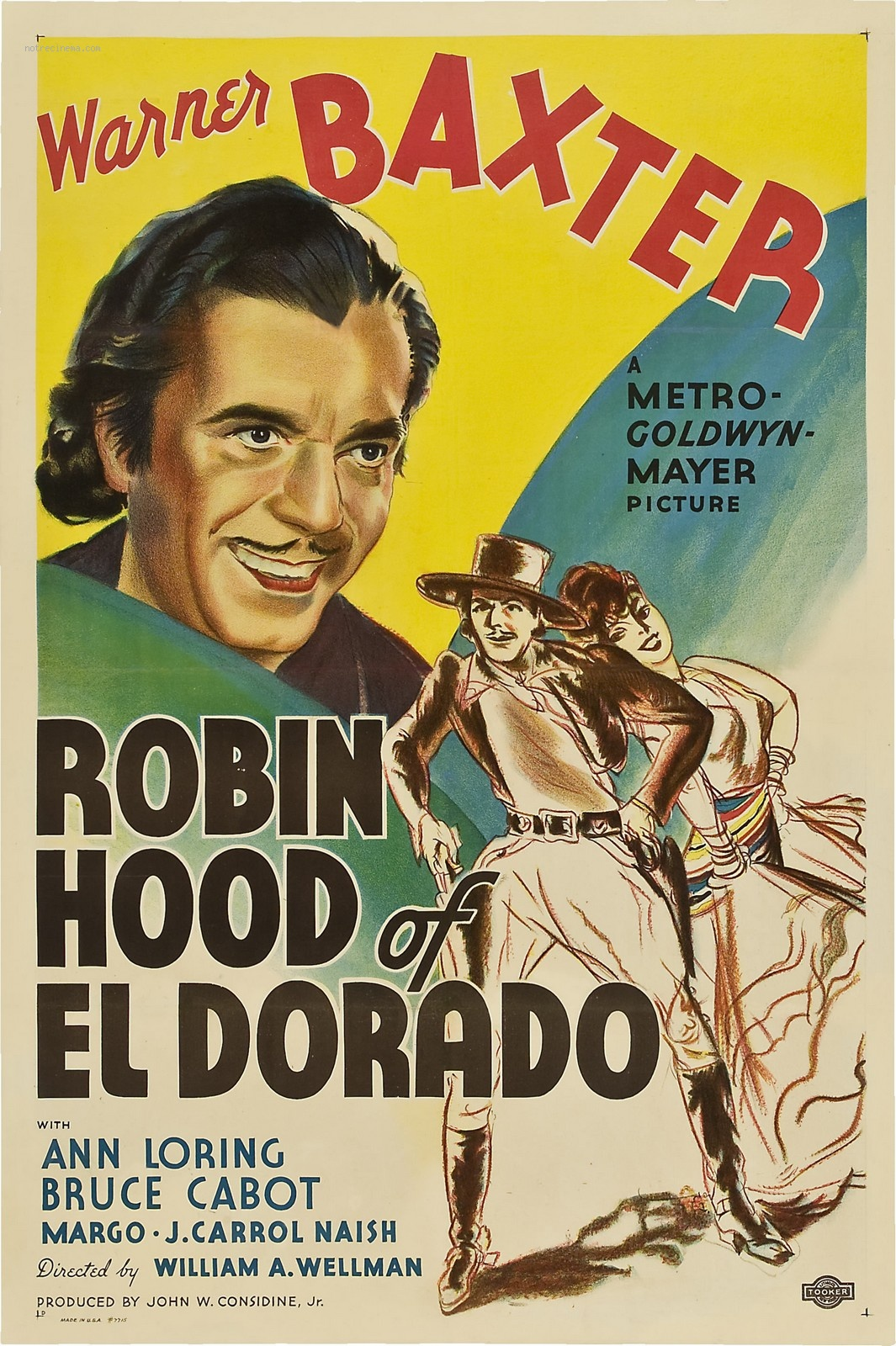
- Directed by: William A. Wellman
- Written by: Walter Noble Burns
- Screenplay by: William A. Wellman; Joseph Calleia; Melvin Levy
- Based on: The Robin Hood of El Dorado: The Saga of Joaquin Murrieta, Famous Outlaw of California's Age of Gold (1932), by Walter Noble Burns
- Produced by: John W. Considine Jr.
- Starring: Warner Baxter; Ann Loring; Bruce Cabot
- Cinematography: Chester A. Lyons
- Edited by: Robert Kern
- Music by: Herbert Stothart
- Distributed by: Metro-Goldwyn-Mayer
- Release date: March 17, 1936
- Running time: 85 minutes
- Country: United States
- Language: English

Robin Hood of El Dorado is a 1936 American Western film directed by William A. Wellman for MGM. It stars Warner Baxter as real-life Mexican folk hero, Joaquin Murrieta, and Ann Loring as his love interest, with Bruce Cabot as Bill Warren and J. Carrol Naish as Murrietta's notorious partner, Three-Fingered Jack. The film is based on the life of Murrietta as the Robin Hood of Old California in 1850, a kind, gentle man who is driven to violence.

== Plot summary ==
In 1848 in California, Mexican farmer Joaquin Murietta has become a criminal to avenge the rape and murder of his wife, Rosita, and lynching of his brother, Jose, at the hands of the Americans.

== Cast ==
- Warner Baxter as Joaquin Murrietta
- Ann Loring as Juanita de la Cuesta
- Bruce Cabot as Bill Warren
- Margo as Rosita
- J. Carrol Naish as Three-Fingered Jack
- Soledad Jiménez as Madre Murrietta
- Carlos de Valdez as Jose Murrietta
- Eric Linden as Johnnie Warren
- Edgar Kennedy as Sheriff Judd
- Charles Trowbridge as Ramon de la Cuesta
- Harvey Stevens as Captain Osborne
- Ralph Remley as Judge Perkins
- George Regas as Tomas
- Harry Woods as Pete
- Francis McDonald as Pedro the Spy
- Kay Hughes as Louise
- Paul Hurst as Wilson
- Boothe Howard as Tablard

== Notes ==
The screenplay was written by the actor Joseph Calleia, Melvin Levy and William A. Wellman, with assistance by Robert Carson. In 1937, Wellman and Carson won an Academy Award for Best Screenplay for A Star Is Born. The Robin Hood of El Dorado was based on the biography of Joaquin Murrieta by Walter Noble Burns and was MGM's attempt to follow Viva Villa!.

Film historian Frank T. Thompson writes that "Wellman made a stronger statement on the subject of racism than a whole spate of later films (like Gentleman's Agreement)."

The Robin Hood of El Dorado also anticipates the revisionist westerns of the 1960s, especially The Wild Bunch (1969), directed by Sam Peckinpah. Both films mix violence and sentimentality with an undercurrent of regret for a vanishing way of life. The Mexican folk song "La golondrina" is used to similar effect.

Art director David Townsend was killed in a car accident while scouting locations for the film.

== Crew ==
- David Townsend, art director
- Dolly Tree, costume designer
