= Countess Stoeffel =

American actress

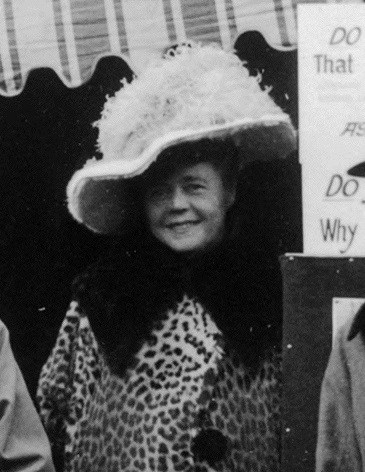
- A 1919 photo of "Gretchen" Wood
- Born: Margarita Gager; 1874; Austria
- Died: June 19, 1928 (aged 53–54); Los Angeles, Los Angeles County, California, U.S.
- Occupations: Physician, Opera Singer, Actress
- Spouse(s): Fischer "Count' Lewis K. Stoeffel; W. O. Wood; Herbert Henshall; Carl H. Ustick

Margaret “Gretchen” Ustick (aka Countess Stoeffel; 1874 – June 19, 1928) was an American actress.

== Early life and education ==
Mrs. Wood, as she was known, was born Margarita Gager in 1874, Vienna, Austria. She married a German national named Fischer and on December 22, 1896, in Todtmoos, Waldshut, Baden-Württemberg, Germany they had one child, Phillip Heinrich Carl Fischer. Margarita and Fischer divorced in 1900. Margarita returned home to Vienna and in 1898, with the help of Count Louis K. Stoeffel of the Arbon Castle at Lake Maggiore at Ticino, she regained custody of her son. She later married "Count" Stoeffel, and it was in Switzerland in 1900 that her son, Heinrich Carl Fischer, was abducted by his father's family.

Mrs. Wood was the first woman in Europe to attain a degree of doctor of medicine from the University of Vienna and permitted to practice abroad. She gained much fame through her skill as a practicing physician and surgeon.

Mrs. Wood studied opera in Milan, Italy under Fritzi Scheff and gave concerts in Vienna, Milan and Paris.

== Career in America ==
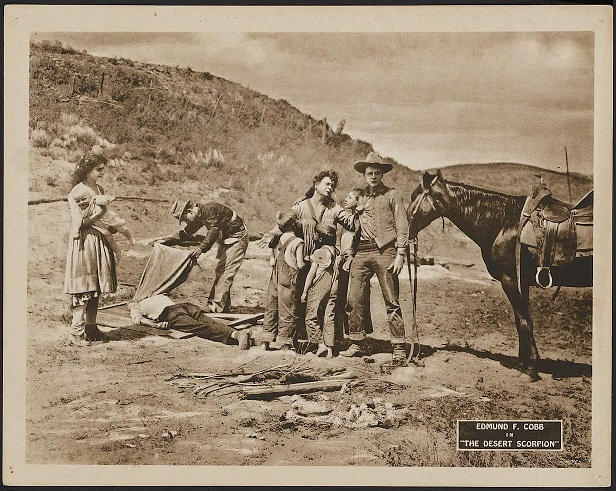
Gretchen Wood as the sheepherder's wife and Edmund F. Cobb in The Desert Scorpion

After the death of "Count" Stoeffel, around 1909, Mrs. Wood married William O. Wood a wealthy Philadelphia businessman, who died in 1913. Together they owned land in Wyoming and in Colorado including the Wigwam Ranch in Jefferson County, Colorado, later renamed the Flying G. Ranch and owned by Girl Scouts. Edsel Ford made a stop at Mrs. Wood's Wigwam Ranch on July 1, 1915, as part of his Transcontinental Tour.

In 1917 she had a Colorado Delegation address Congress in an attempt to get the Defense Department to make an exception and allow her to work as a physician for the United States Military in support of the war effort.

In 1919, Mrs. Wood founded the Art-O-Graf film company of Denver, Colorado, and she was on the board of directors.

In 1920 Mrs. Wood was an actress in the films; Wolves of the Street and The Desert Scorpion.

== Personal life ==
In 1919, Mrs. Wood was contacted by her son, Heinrich Carl Fischer, through the International Red Cross. He had been a German Officer and was wounded and thought to be dying, he asked the physicians to find his mother in America. The mother and son were reunited February 11, 1922, in Denver. He changed his name to Harry Carl Fischer and worked for the Alexander Film Company as a cameraman.

In 1920 she was married to Herbert Henshall in Golden, Colorado whom she divorced only two years later. Then in 1923 she married Clark Henry Ustick, also in Golden, Colorado. She died June 19, 1928, in Los Angeles, California.
