= The Last Man (1932 film) =

1932 film

- Directed by: Howard Higgin
- Written by: Francis Edward Faragoh; Sam Nelson; Keene Thompson
- Starring: Charles Bickford; Constance Cummings; Alec B. Francis
- Cinematography: Benjamin H. Kline
- Edited by: Gene Havlick
- Production company: Columbia Pictures
- Distributed by: Columbia Pictures
- Release date: August 31, 1932
- Running time: 65 minutes
- Country: United States
- Language: English

The Last Man is a 1932 American mystery film directed by Howard Higgin and starring Charles Bickford, Constance Cummings and Alec B. Francis.

== Cast ==
- Charles Bickford as Bannister
- Constance Cummings as Marian
- Alec B. Francis as Mr. Wingate
- Alan Roscoe as Marsden
- Robert Ellis as English Charlie
- James Wang as Won-Le-Ton
- William A. Williams a s. Gibbs
- Jack Carlyle as 1st Mate of the Glencoe
- John Eberts as Egyptian Spy
- Kit Guard as 1st Mate of the Ballentyne
- Edward LeSaint as Captain of the Glencoe
- George Magrill as 2nd Mate of the Ballentyne
- Hal Price as Captain of the Ballentyne
- Jack Richardson as Doctor
- Albert J. Smith as Halborn
- Robert St. Angelo as Joe
- William Sundholm as Swede

== Bibliography ==
- Alan G. Fetrow. Sound films, 1927-1939: a United States Filmography. McFarland, 1992.
