= The Temptations of Satan =

- Directed by: Herbert Blache
- Produced by: Herbert Blaché
- Starring: Joseph Levering; Vinnie Burns as Everygirl; James O'Neill as Satan; Fraunie Fraunholz; Morton as Avarice
- Production company: U.S. Amusement Corporation
- Distributed by: Warner Features Company
- Release date: November 1914 (U.S.)
- Country: United States
- Languages: Silent; English intertitles

The Temptations of Satan is a 1914 American silent film directed by Herbert Blache and starring Joseph Levering, Vinnie Burns and James O'Neill. The film is considered to be lost.

== Plot ==
Satan (James O'Neill) decides to ruin the innocence of ambitious Everygirl (Vinnie Burns), who has a beautiful voice and wishes to pursue a career singing in opera. He thus assumes human form and follows her in order to make sure that she accepts his terms.

== Cast ==
- Joseph Levering as Everyboy
- Vinnie Burns as Everygirl
- James O'Neill as Satan
- Fraunie Fraunholz as Justice
- Morton as Avarice
