= Battling Bates =

1923 film

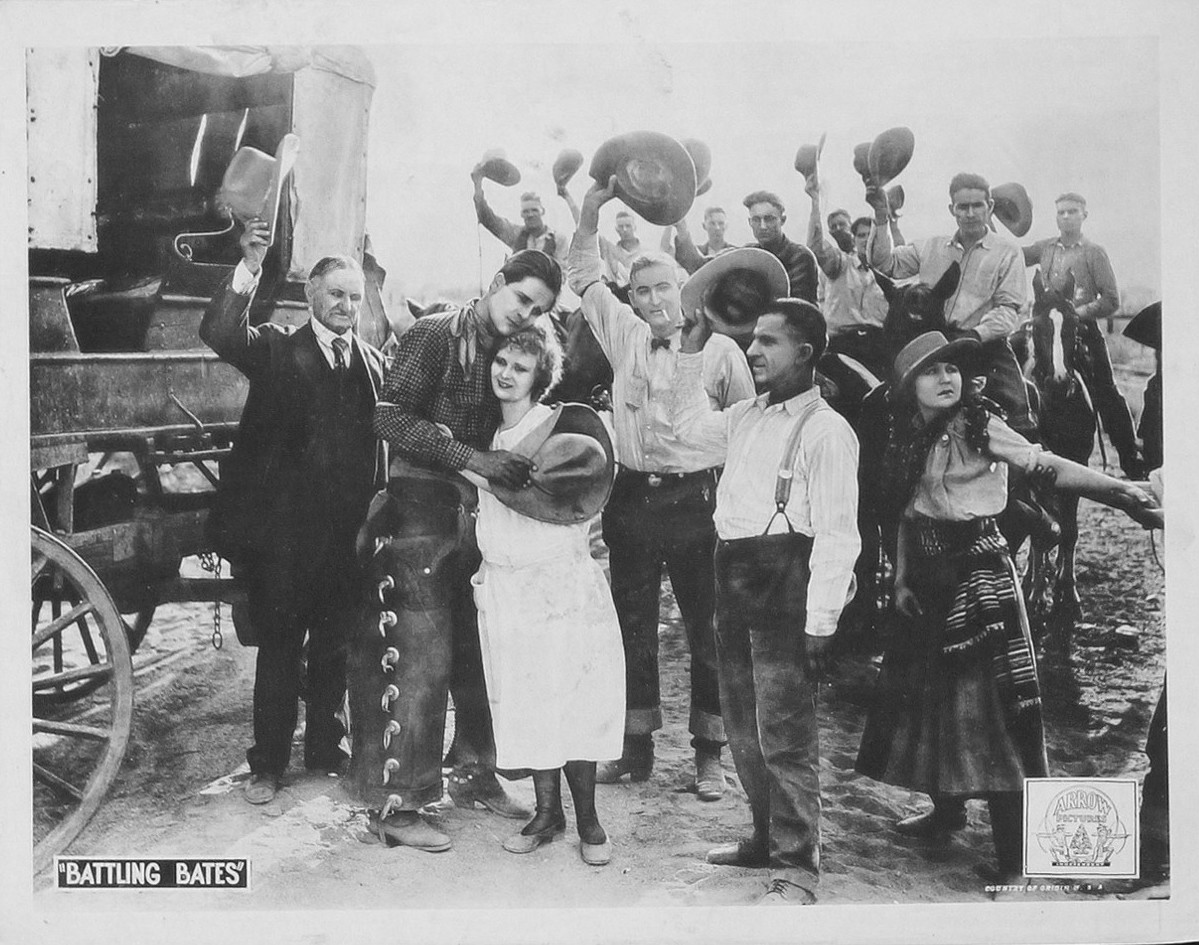
- Directed by: Webster Cullison
- Written by: Daniel F. Whitcomb
- Produced by: Ashton Dearholt
- Starring: Edmund Cobb; Florence Gilbert; Ashton Dearholt
- Production company: Ashton Dearholt Productions
- Distributed by: Arrow Film Corporation
- Release date: December 15, 1923
- Running time: 50 minutes
- Country: United States
- Languages: Silent; English intertitles

Battling Bates is a 1923 American silent Western film directed by Webster Cullison and starring Edmund Cobb, Florence Gilbert and Ashton Dearholt.

== Plot ==
Fred Porter is U.S. Secret Service agent on the trail of a gang of outlaws.

Entering a cattle community as a stranger, Porter rescues a young rancher from an ambush. It seems that a jealous woman, rejected by the ranger who has been wooing another in town, has sent her henchmen out to kill him.

The culprits happen to be members of the same gang that Porter has been tracking.

== Cast ==
- Edmund Cobb as Fred Porter
- Florence Gilbert
- Ashton Dearholt
