= Western Yesterdays =

1924 film

- Directed by: Francis Ford
- Written by: Ashton Dearholt; Francis Ford; E.R. Hickson
- Produced by: Ashton Dearholt
- Starring: Edmund Cobb; Florence Gilbert; Ashton Dearholt
- Production company: Ashton Dearholt Productions
- Distributed by: Arrow Film Corporation
- Release date: May 1, 1924
- Running time: 50 minutes
- Country: United States
- Languages: Silent; English intertitles

Western Yesterdays is a 1924 American silent Western film directed by Francis Ford and starring Edmund Cobb, Florence Gilbert and Ashton Dearholt.

== Cast ==
- Edmund Cobb as Deputy Jim Blake
- Florence Gilbert as Rose Silver
- William White as Sheriff Bill Hickson
- Ashton Dearholt as Pinto Pete
- Helen Broneau as Juanita
- Joe De La Cruz as Rude Reverence
- Francis Ford as Twitchie
- Clark B. Coffey as Clarence
- Mark Hamilton as Blackstone

== Bibliography ==
- Munden, Kenneth White. The American Film Institute Catalog of Motion Pictures Produced in the United States, Part 1. University of California Press, 1997.
