= James Wang (actor) =

Chinese actor and casting agent (c. 1863–1935)

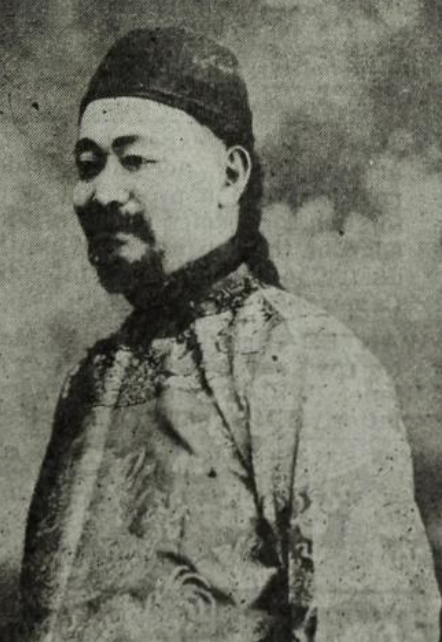
- James Wang, from a 1919 publication
- Born: 1863; Zhili, China
- Died: 1935 (aged 71–72); Los Angeles, California, USA
- Occupations: Actor; Casting agent
- Years active: 1910 - 1930

James Wang (c. 1863 – 1935) was a Chinese actor and casting agent who worked in Hollywood from the 1910s to the 1930s. He is known for discovering the actress Anna May Wong.

== Biography ==
Wang arrived in San Francisco around 1878 at the age of 18.

He told reporters he had been raised by missionaries in China, and that when he came to the United States, he began working as a minister at churches in Boston and New York City.

He was accused of being a member of the Hip Sing Association — a Chinese-American street gang — in the early 1900s, although he was also an advocate for reform in New York City's Chinatown neighborhood, and offered up evidence that led to a number of police raids.

Eventually, he made his way to Los Angeles, where he pursued a career as an actor and a casting agent. He was often called on to procure Chinese talent by the major studios, and it was in this capacity that he discovered a young Anna May Wong in Los Angeles's Chinatown neighborhood.

== Selected filmography ==
- The Last Man (1932)
- China Seas (1935)
- The Painted Veil (1934)
- Men of the Night (1934)
- The Cat's-Paw (1934)
- Charlie Chan's Courage (1934)
- The Hell Cat (1934)
- Ever Since Eve (1934)
- The Secrets of Wu Sin (1932)
- Roar of the Dragon (1932)
- Charlie Chan's Chance (1932)
- Are These Our Children (1931)
- The Black Camel (1931)
- Welcome Danger (1929)
- Old San Francisco (1927)
- The Yankee Clipper (1927)
- The Non-Stop Flight (1926)
- Never the Twain Shall Meet (1925)
- The Eagle's Feather (1923)
- Desert Driven (1923)
- Tipped Off (1923)
- East Is West (1922)
- Hills of Missing Men (1922)
- Lotus Blossom (1921)
- The City of Dim Faces (1918)

== Bibliography ==
- Chan, A.B. (2007). Perpetually Cool: The Many Lives of Anna May Wong (1905-1961). The Scarecrow Filmmakers Series. Scarecrow Press. ISBN 978-1-4616-7041-4.
