= The Desert Scorpion =

1920 American silent Western film by Otis B. Thayer

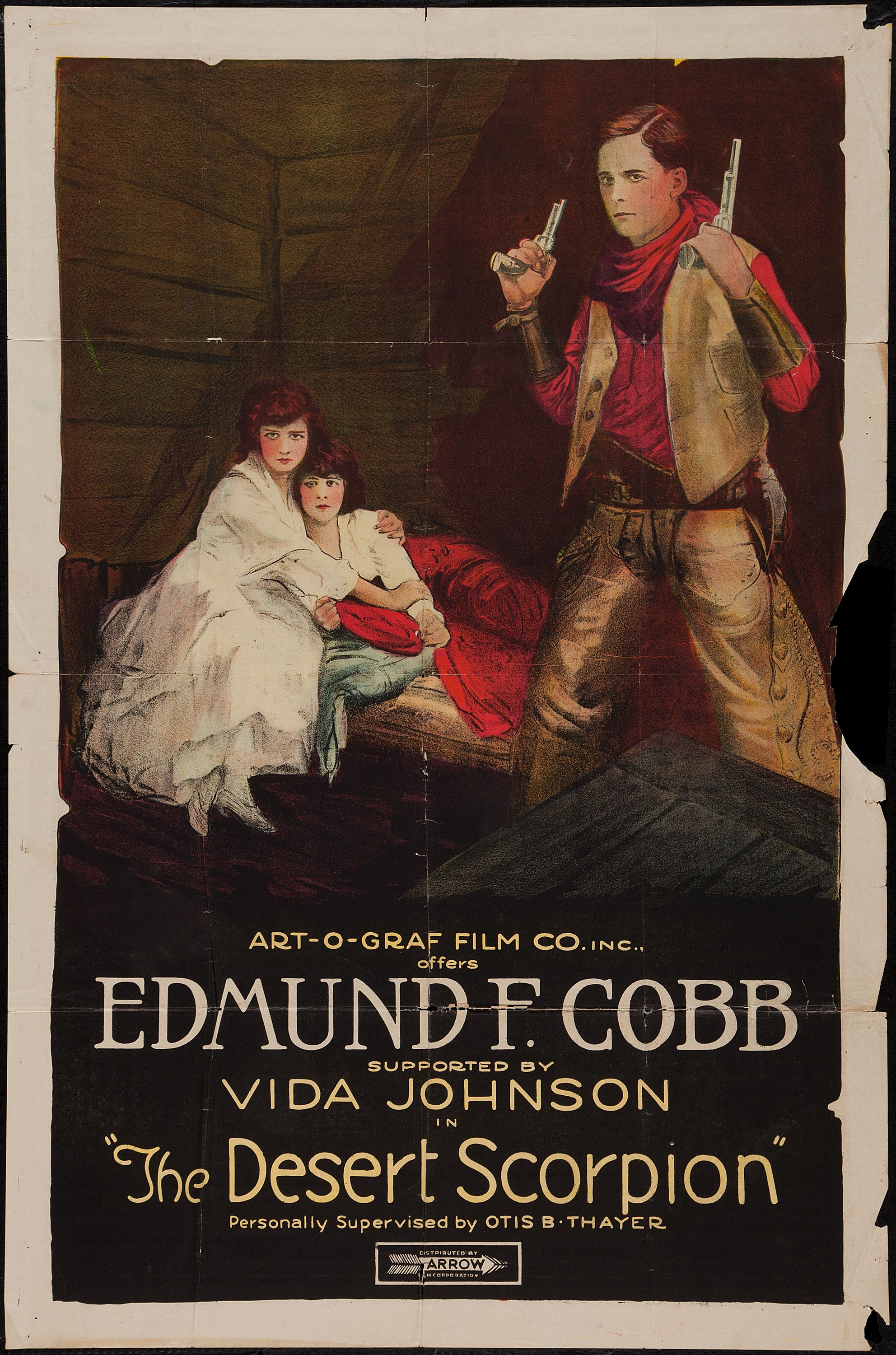
- Directed by: Otis B. Thayer
- Story by: L. V. Jefferson
- Starring: Edmund Cobb
- Production company: Art-O-Graph Film Company
- Distributed by: Arrow Film Corporation
- Release date: January 15, 1920
- Running time: 6 reels
- Country: United States
- Languages: Silent; English intertitles

The Desert Scorpion (originally titled The Last of the Open Range) is a 1920 American silent Western film directed by Otis B. Thayer and starring Edmund Cobb and Vida Johnson. The film was shot in Denver, Colorado by the Thayer's Art-O-Graf film company.

== Plot ==
A feud between sheepherders and cattlemen heats up when the cattlemen set fire to the sheepherder's homes. The Sheepherder, who is in love with the Cattle Queen's daughter, leads a robbery on the cattlemen's bank. The Sheriff's daughter is impregnated and deserted by the Cattle Queen's daughter's fiancé. The sheepherders rescue her and abduct the Cattle King's daughter to nurse her back to health. The cattlemen track them back to the cabin where everything is revealed and forgiven. And the Cattle Queen's daughter falls in love with the Sheepherder.

== Cast ==
- Edmund Cobb as the Sheepherder
- Vida Johnson as his daughter
- Clare Hatten as the Cattle Queen
- Otis B. Thayer as the Sheriff
- Gretchen Wood as a sheepherder's wife
- Zelma Edwards
- Frank Gallager
- A. E. McCormick
- Dave Campbell
- Babe Courvoisier
- Fred Shafer
- Lewis Milner

== Crew ==
- Otis B. Thayer Managing Director
- Vernon L. Walker Head Cameraman
- H. Haller Murphy Cameraman

== Censorship ==
Initially rejected in its entirety by the Kansas Board of Review, it was passed upon review with several cuts. The board required the elimination of several intertitles portraying the Sheriff's daughter as being "love sick" rather than betrayed, and to eliminate all references to her giving birth in the cabin.

== Preservation ==
With no holdings located in archives, The Desert Scorpion is considered a lost film.
