= Riders of the Range (1923 film) =

1923 film

- Directed by: Otis B. Thayer
- Story by: Courtney Ryley Cooper
- Produced by: Roy M. Langdon
- Starring: Edmund Cobb, Dolly Dale, Helen Hayes
- Cinematography: W. E. Smith
- Production company: Art-O-Graf
- Distributed by: Truart Film
- Release date: February 15, 1923
- Country: United States
- Languages: Silent; English intertitles

Riders of the Range is a 1923 American silent Western film presented by Clifford S. Efelt, directed by Otis B. Thayer, and starring Edmund Cobb, Dolly Dale, Helen Hayes and Frank Gallagher. The film was shot in Colorado by Thayer's Art-O-Graf film company. It was a Roy M. Langdon Production. The film was released on VHS by Grapevine Video.

== Plot ==
A growing number of cattle raids prompts the cattlemen to call on their cattlemen's association president Martin Lethbridge to investigate. Sheep Ranchers are suspected, who led by Gregg Randall blame the cattlemen for increased casualties among the sheep herds. Letherbridge falls in love with Randall's daughter, Dolly, and eventually exposes Blunt Vanier as the cause of the conflict.

== Cast ==
- Edmund Cobb as Martin Lethbridge
- Frank Gallagher as Blunt Vanier
- Clare Hatton as Gregg Randall
- Roy Langdon as Bob Randall
- Harry Ascher as Red Morriss
- E. Glendower as Soapweed Harris
- B. Bonaventure as Roddy, the sheriff
- Levi Simpson as Wagner
- Dolly Dale as Dolly
- Helen M. Hayes as Inez
- Mae Dean as Neil Barclay
- Ann Drew as Mary Smithson

== Crew ==
- Otis B. Thayer Managing Director
- Vernon L. Walker Head Cameraman
- H. Haller Murphy Cameraman
- William E. Smith Photography
