= Florence Gilbert =

American actress

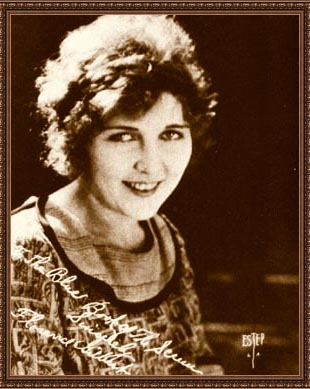
- Born: February 20, 1904; Chicago, Illinois, U.S.
- Died: February 27, 1991 (aged 87); Sylmar, California, U.S.
- Years active: 1920–1927
- Spouses: Ashton Dearholt (m. 1926; div. 1934); Edgar Rice Burroughs (m. 1935; div. 1941); Albert S. Chase (m. 1942)
- Children: 2

Florence Gilbert (born Florence Ella Gleistein; February 20, 1904 – February 27, 1991) was an American silent film actress of the 1920s. She was renowned for playing supporting roles alongside such actors as William Fairbanks and Jack Hoxie.

== Biography ==
Florence Ella Gleistein was born to George Gleistein and Maude Kern in Chicago, where she grew up before moving to Los Angeles at the age of 14 (c. 1918) with her brother and mother in the hopes of discovering a career in the film industry. It was in Los Angeles that she was spotted by Italian actor, director and producer Monty Banks. In Hollywood she worked for Al Christie and Fox Studios under the stage name of Florence Gilbert, making over 50 film appearances from the 1920s onward, including the first time Stan Laurel and Oliver Hardy appeared together on film, in The Lucky Dog (1921).

== Personal life and marriages ==
Around 1926, when The Johnstown Flood was released, she married entrepreneur Ashton Dearholt and bore him two children, Lee and Caryl Lee.

She divorced Dearholt after he returned from filming The New Adventures of Tarzan in Guatemala with co-star Ula Holt in tow and insisted that Holt be able to live in the Dearholt home.

She subsequently married Tarzan creator Edgar Rice Burroughs.

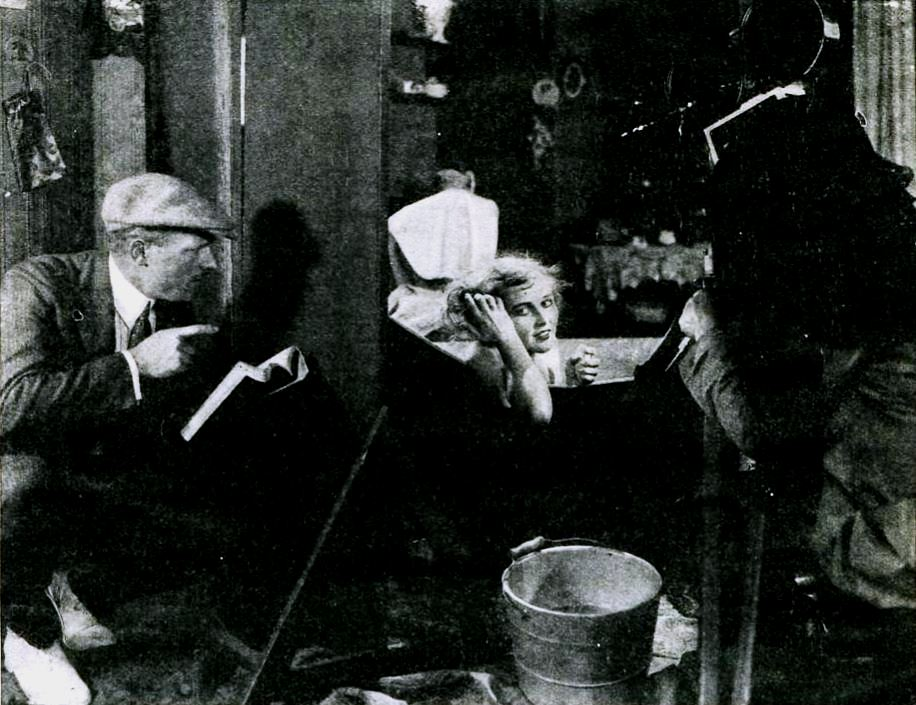
Photo of Gilbert taken from the January 1921 issue of Film Fun

== Partial filmography ==
- Down Home (1920)
- The Lucky Dog (1921)
- The Greater Claim (1921)
- Hills of Missing Men (1922)
- Back Fire (1922)
- Battling Bates (1923)
- Breaking Into Society (1923)
- Spawn of the Desert (1923)
- The Girl in the Limousine (1924)
- Cupid's Rustler (1924)
- Western Yesterdays (1924)
- The Diamond Bandit (1924)
- Lash of the Whip (1924)
- A Man Four-Square (1926)
- The Johnstown Flood (1926)
- The Mad Racer (1926)
- The Return of Peter Grimm (1926)
- Love Makes 'Em Wild (1927)
