= James O'Neill (actor, born 1863) =

American actor (born 1863)

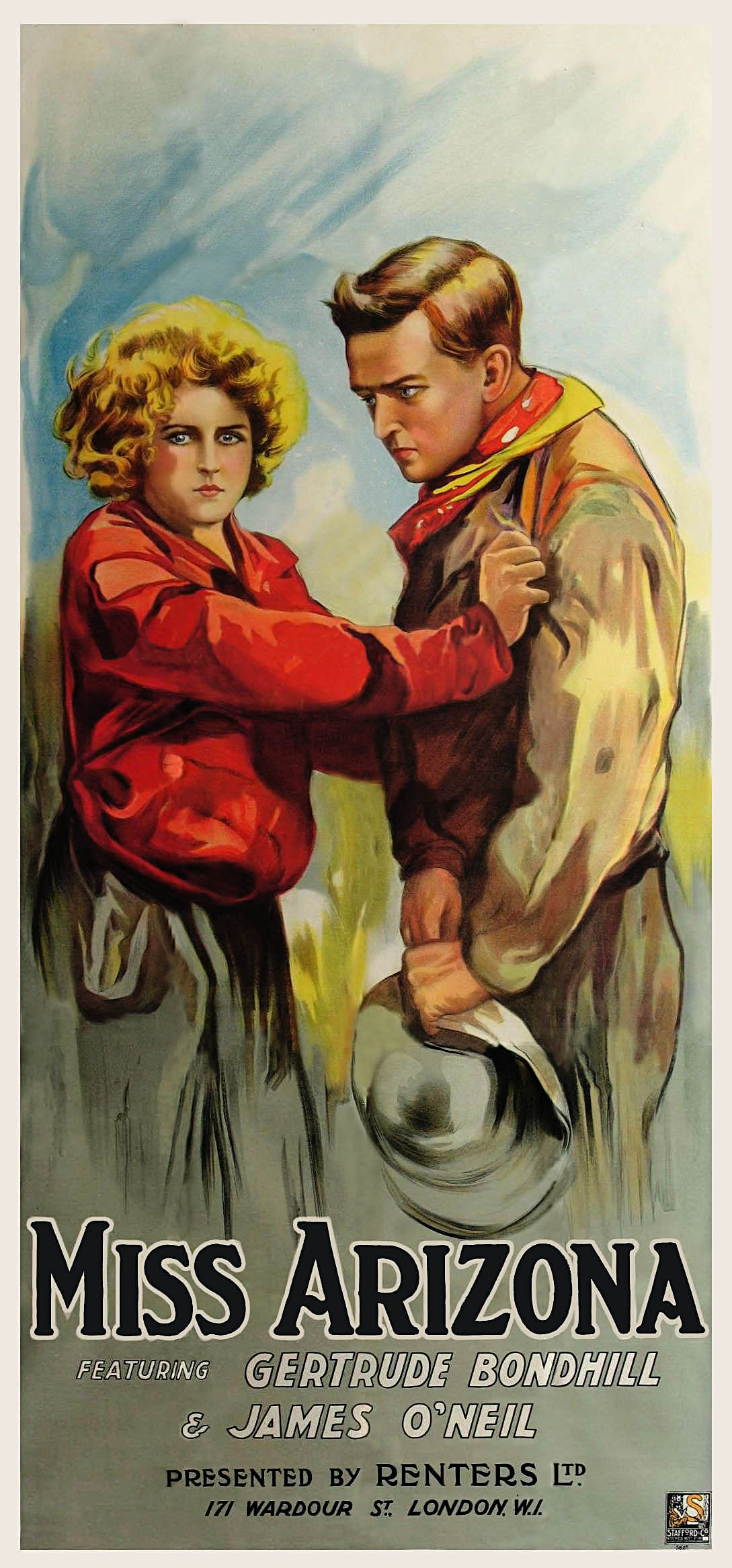
- Poster for Miss Arizona (1919) with James O'Neill
- Born: James O'Neill Jr. July 21, 1863; Philadelphia, Pennsylvania, U.S.
- Died: October 8, 1938 (aged 75); Los Angeles, California, U.S.
- Occupation: Actor
- Years active: 1913 – 1927

James O'Neill (July 21, 1863 – October 8, 1938) was an American actor. Before his silent film career he was a vaudeville stage actor.

== Filmography ==
- Ben Bolt (1913)
- The Star of India (1913)
- The Rogues of Paris (1913)
- The Fight for Millions (1913)
- The Temptations of Satan (1914)
- The Lure (1914)
- The Million Dollar Robbery (1914)
- A Fight for Freedom; Or, Exiled to Siberia (1914)
- My Madonna (1915)
- Her Own Way (1915)
- The Heart of a Painted Woman (1915)
- The Honor of Mary Blake (1916)
- The Traveling Salesman (1916)
- The Raggedy Queen (1917)
- House of Cards (1917)
- The Boy Girl (1917)
- Miss Arizona (1919)
- The Whisper Market (1920)
- The Courage of Marge O'Doone (1920)
- Captain Swift (1920)
- The Kickback (1922)
- Sitting Bull at the Spirit Lake Massacre (1927)
