= Love and Bullets (1916 film) =

Love and Bullets is a silent film that was directed by Clay M. Greene. Made by the Lubin Manufacturing Company, Greene also wrote the screenplay for the film. The film premiered on April 29, 1916. It starred George Clark as Captain Gunn, John Sherman as Mr Wiseman, Vinnie Burns as Louisa Gunn/June Daye, Francis Joyner as Hector Timid, Kempton Greene as Fred Thornton, and Adelaide Hayes as Chatter, Louisa's Maid. A short film, it was one reel in length.

== Plot ==
Louisa Gunn wants the freedom to choose her own husband, but her father, Captain Gunn, insists that he will choose one for her. He selects two men as potential suitors, Hector Timid and Mr. Wiseman, both of whom Louisa dislikes. She uses her wits to make herself disagreeable to both men, and in so doing, finally gets her father to agree to let her choose her own marital fate.
