= The Bowl of Baal =

1975 novel by Robert Ames Bennet

- Dust-jacket from the first edition
- Author: Robert Ames Bennet
- Illustrator: David Ireland
- Cover artist: David Ireland
- Language: English
- Genre: Science fiction novel
- Publisher: Donald M. Grant, Publisher, Inc.
- Publication date: 1975
- Publication place: United States
- Media type: Print (hardback)
- Pages: 351 pp
- OCLC: 2930832

The Bowl of Baal is a 1975 science fiction novel by Robert Ames Bennet. It was first published in book form in 1975 by Donald M. Grant, Publisher, Inc. in an edition of 1,600 copies. The novel was originally serialized in All Around Magazine beginning in 1916.

== Plot introduction ==
The novel adventures in the lost world of Baal in Arabia, which is inhabited by dinosaurs.
