= The Johnstown Flood (1926 film) =

1926 film by Irving Cummings

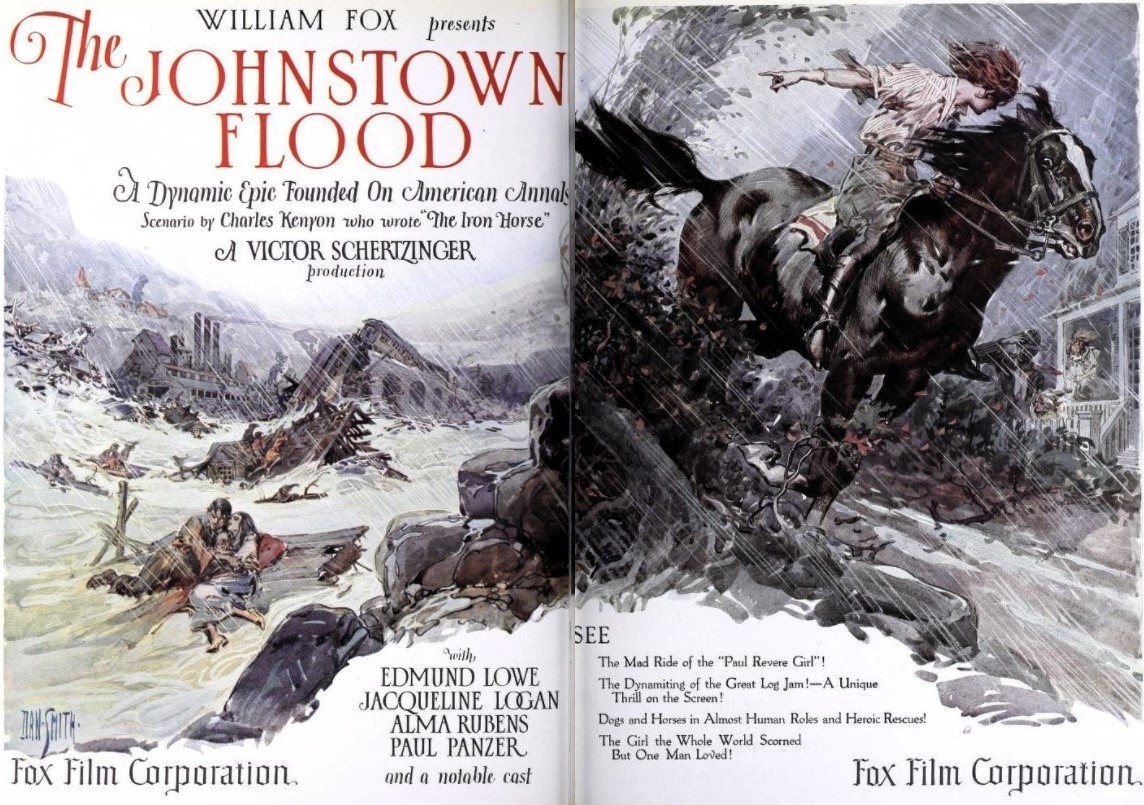
- Advertisement
- Directed by: Irving Cummings
- Written by: Edfrid A. Bingham; Robert Lord
- Produced by: William Fox
- Starring: George O'Brien; Florence Gilbert; Janet Gaynor
- Cinematography: George Schneiderman
- Distributed by: Fox Film Corporation
- Release date: February 28, 1926
- Running time: 60 minutes
- Country: United States
- Language: Silent (English intertitles)

The Johnstown Flood (1926) by Irving Cummings

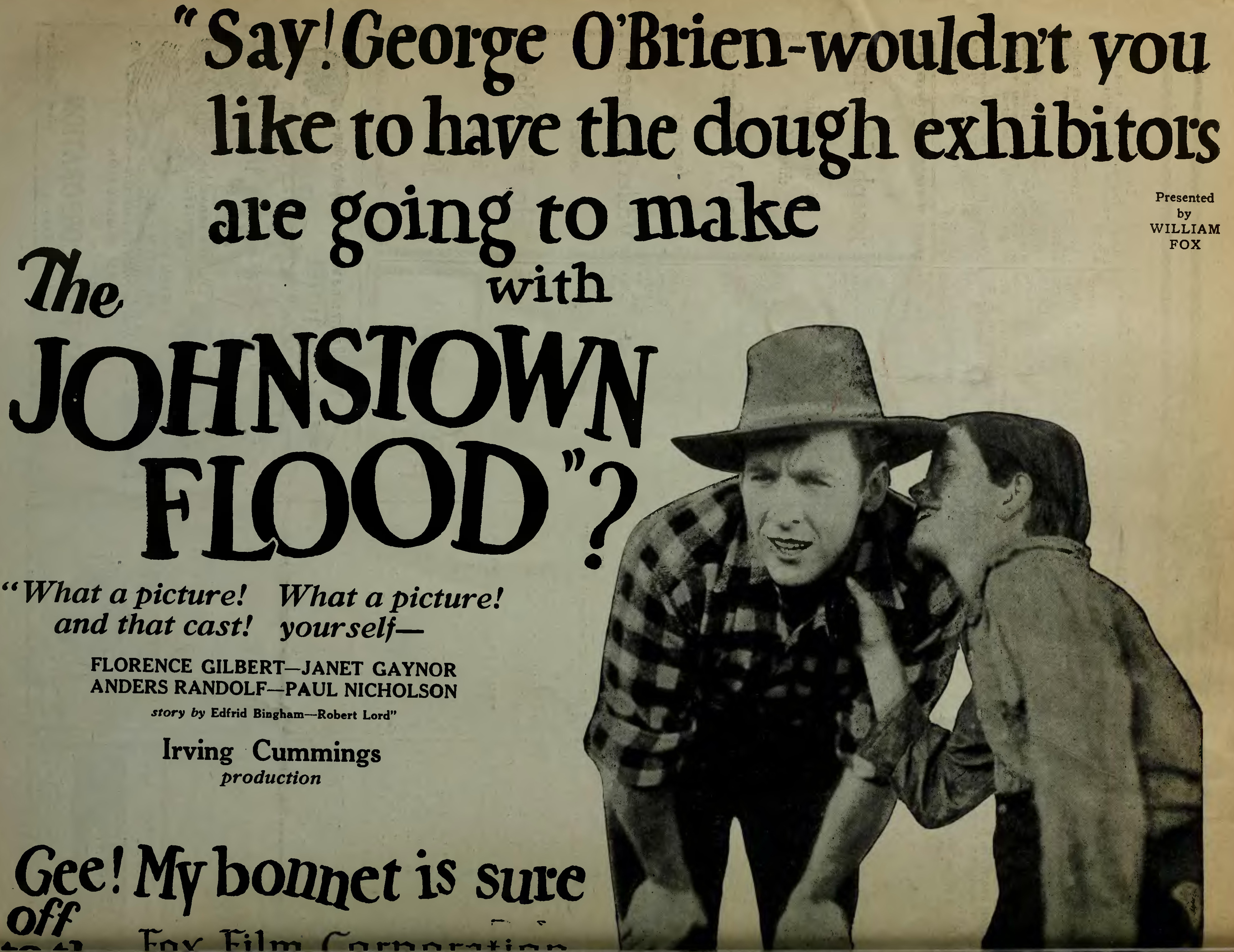
The Johnstown Flood ad in The Film Daily, 1926

The Johnstown Flood is a 1926 American silent epic film directed by Irving Cummings, that addresses the Great Flood of 1889 in Johnstown, Pennsylvania. The film stars George O'Brien, Florence Gilbert, and Janet Gaynor.

== Plot ==
Tom O'Day becomes engaged to Gloria Hamilton, the daughter of wealthy logging magnate John Hamilton, and plans to marry her while her father is away in Pittsburgh. Anna Burger, a workman's daughter, harbors unrequited love for Tom. One of the lumber camps owned by John Hamilton is situated upriver of Johnstown, Pennsylvania. To fulfill lumber contracts, Hamilton's crews clear as many trees as possible and maintain the water level behind the dam at maximum capacity to float them to the mill. Despite O'Day's warning that impounding water weakens the dam, Hamilton dismisses his concerns. It is not until a consortium of townspeople intervenes and convinces Hamilton to hire a state inspector that he agrees to address the issue.

Shortly after the meeting Hamilton receives a message that "Ajax Construction" heard he'd suspended operations and plans to have their lumber contract fulfilled elsewhere, prompting Hamilton to hire men to take over and hold the dam so that he may continue business. The men hold the dam, even shooting at a concerned mob of townspeople attempting to retake the site.

As Tom and Gloria's wedding begins a cloudburst rips the dam apart, sending a cascade of floodwater and logs towards Johnstown. Anna Burger, who was on her way to see Tom via horse, begins to ride through town as fast as possible to warn all of the inhabitants about the flood.

Anna makes it to the church before the flood hits it, allowing many wedding goers to escape. The train carrying Gloria's father back to Johnstown is impacted by a trestle destroyed by debris and fire, killing many.

Though Tom and Gloria escape the church together, he is driven to find Anna but is too late and discovers her body in the building's wreckage.

The closing title card reads 'Toil overcame desolation and Johnstown was rebuilt anew' just before a few shots showing citizens getting back to their lives.

== Cast ==
- George O'Brien as Tom O'Day
- Florence Gilbert as Gloria Hamilton
- Janet Gaynor as Anna Burger
- Anders Randolf as John Hamilton, lumber camp boss
- Paul Nicholson as Ward Peyton
- Paul Panzer as Joe Burger, Anna’s Father
- George Harris as Young Sidney Mandel
- Max Davidson as David Mandel
- Walter Perry as Pat O'Day
- Sid Jordan as Mullins
- Gary Cooper as Flood Survivor (uncredited)
- Kay Deslys as Dance Hall Queen (uncredited)
- Clark Gable as Extra Standing at Bar in Saloon (uncredited)
- Florence Lawrence as Undetermined Role (uncredited)
- Carole Lombard as One of Gloria's Four Friends/Bridesmaid (uncredited)
- George H. Reed as Camp Cook (uncredited)

== Production ==
The flood sequences were actually filmed in and around Santa Cruz, California. Special effects supervisors Jack Smith and Roy Davidson built miniature sets that could realistically collapse under moving water. A local lumber company and local buildings were used as sets.

Film historian Robert A. Harris considers the film remarkable for its time, because of the vivid way it recreated the flood, saying: "The importance of The Johnstown Flood to film history is difficult to overstate. The special effects of the film combine miniatures and sets to depict the actual historic event of flood and its aftermath, pioneering complex techniques. It was the Star Wars of its day."

== Preservation ==
The Johnstown Flood is a surviving film with a print held in the George Eastman Museum Motion Picture Collection.
