= The Courage of Marge O'Doone =

1920 film

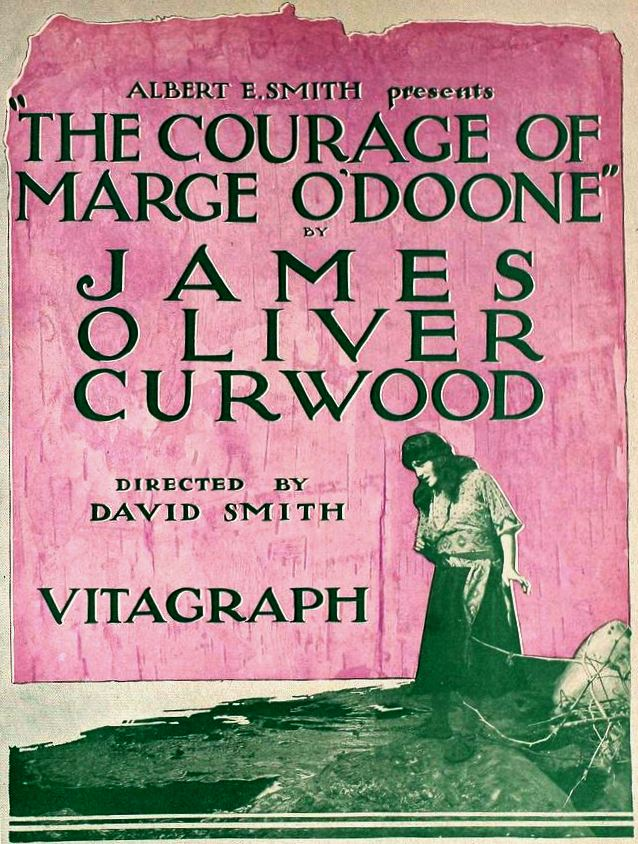
- Advert for film
- Directed by: David Smith
- Written by: Robert N. Bradbury; James Oliver Curwood (novel)
- Produced by: Albert E. Smith
- Starring: Pauline Starke; Niles Welch; Billie Bennett; Boris Karloff
- Production company: Vitagraph Company of America
- Release date: May 30, 1920
- Running time: 70 minutes (7 reels)
- Country: United States
- Language: Silent (English intertitles)

The Courage of Marge O'Doone is a 1920 American silent drama film directed by David Smith and featuring Pauline Starke, Billie Bennett, Niles Welch and Boris Karloff (as Buck Tavish, a mountain man). It was written by Robert N. Bradbury, based on the novel by James Oliver Curwood. The film is considered to be lost.

== Plot ==
Michael O'Doone, his wife Margaret and daughter Marge are settlers living in the Northwest. While traveling on a winter day, Michael meets with an accident and never returns home. Thinking that her husband is dead, Margaret begins to lose her grip on sanity which enables Buck Tavish, a mountain man who always admired her, to abduct her and take her to his cabin. When she finally regains her senses, she departs on a search for Michael O'Doone, leaving her daughter Marge behind. At one point in the film, there is a scene where two large ferocious grizzly bears fight with each other, a highlight of the movie.

Years later, David Raine comes across a young girl's photograph and determines to find her. Soon after, he meets Rolland, a man who spends much of his life helping others. While searching in the wilderness, David finally finds the girl in the picture, who turns out to be Marge O'Doone. He brings her to Rolland's cabin and there they discover to her surprise that Rolland is actually her missing father Michael O'Doone. Miraculously, the whole family is reunited when her mother Margaret is found soon after.

== Cast ==
- Pauline Starke as Marge O'Doone
- Niles Welch as David Raine
- George Stanley as Michael O'Doone
- Jack Curtis as Brokaw
- William Dyer as Hauck
- Boris Karloff as Buck Tavish
- Billie Bennett as Margaret O'Doone
- James O'Neill as Jukoki
- Vincente Howard
- Jeanne Carpenter

== See also ==
- List of American films of 1920
- Boris Karloff filmography
