= Out of the Depths (1921 film) =

1921 American silent western film

- Directed by: Otis B. Thayer, Frank Reicher
- Screenplay by: Art-O-Graf
- Story by: Robert Ames Bennett
- Distributed by: Pioneer Pictures
- Release date: February 1921
- Country: United States
- Languages: Silent; English intertitles

Out of the Depths is a 1921 American silent Western film based on a book by Robert Ames Bennet and directed by Otis B. Thayer and Frank Reicher, starring Edmund Cobb and Violet Mersereau. The film was shot in Denver, Colorado by Thayer's Art-O-Graf film company. It is now considered a lost film.

== Plot summary ==
Two engineers developing irrigation systems for desert land fall for the same girl. One of the men tries unsuccessfully to murder the other man, who eventually is identified as the girl's long lost brother.

== Cast ==
- Edmund Cobb
- Violet Mersereau

== Crew ==
- Otis B. Thayer Managing Director
- Vernon L. Walker Head Camermaan
- H. Haller Murphy Cameraman
