= Wild Honey (1918 film) =

1918 film

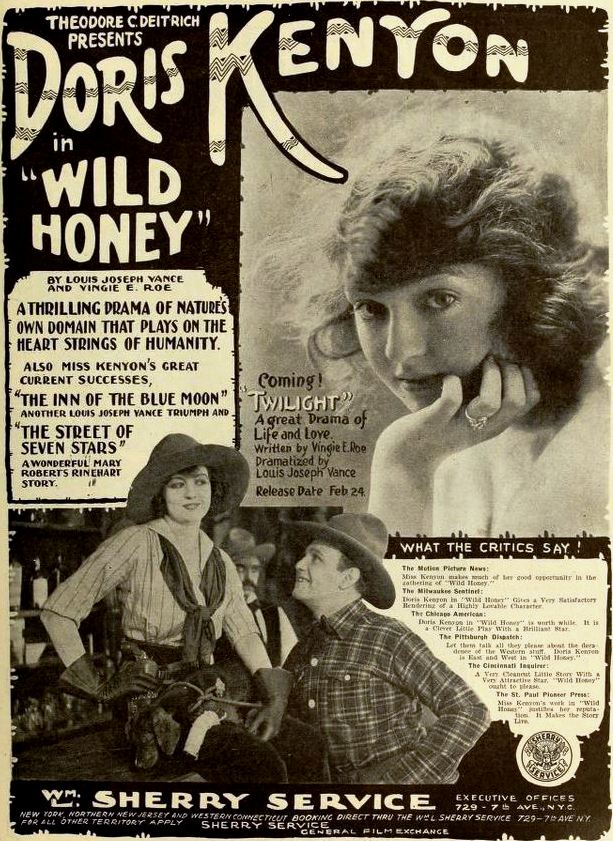
- period advertisement
- Directed by: Francis J. Grandon
- Written by: Louis Joseph Vance (scenario)
- Based on: "Wild Honey" by Vingie E. Roe
- Produced by: Theodore C. Deitrich
- Starring: Doris Kenyon
- Cinematography: Ned Van Buren; Jacob A. Badaracco
- Production company: De Luxe Pictures
- Distributed by: William L. Sherry Service
- Release date: December 9, 1918
- Running time: 60 minutes
- Country: United States
- Languages: Silent; English intertitles

Wild Honey is a 1918 silent film western directed by Francis J. Grandon and starring Doris Kenyon. The film is preserved in the archives of the Museum of Modern Art.

== Cast ==
- Doris Kenyon – Wild Honey/ Mrs. Holbrook
- Frank R. Mills – Reverend Jim Brown/Pastor Holbrook (*this Frank Mills, stage actor born 1870 died 1921)
- Edgar Jones – Dick Jones
- John Hopkins – Joe Stacey
- Joseph P. Mack – Jim Belcher
- Howard Kyle – Doc Bliss
- H. J. Hebert – Ed Southern
- Herbert Standing – Reverend David Warwick
- Nellie King – Minnie Lou
- Vinnie Burns – Trixianita
- Ruth Taylor – Gold Hill Ida
- Mildred Leary – Letty Noon
