= Finders Keepers (1921 film) =

1921 film

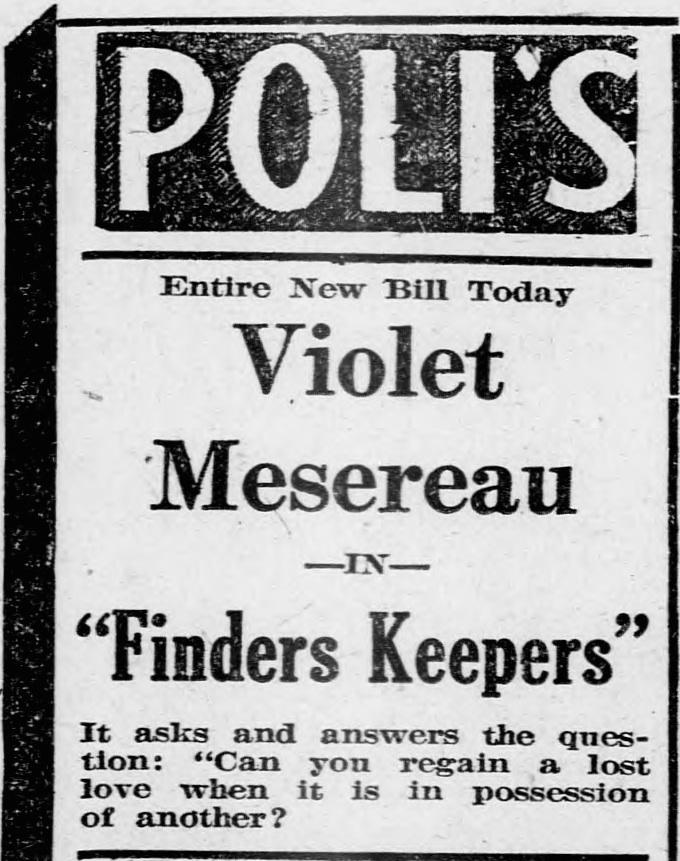
- Text based advertisement for the film in a contemporary newspaper
- Directed by: Otis B. Thayer
- Screenplay by: Art-O-Graf
- Story by: Robert Ames Bennett
- Starring: Edmund Cobb; Violet Mersereau
- Distributed by: Pioneer Pictures
- Release date: February 1921
- Country: United States
- Languages: Silent; English intertitles

Finders Keepers is a 1921 American silent Western film based on a book by Robert Ames Bennett and directed by Otis B. Thayer, starring Edmund Cobb and Violet Mersereau. The film was shot in Denver, Colorado by the Thayer's Art-O-Graf film company. The film is now considered a lost film.

== Plot ==
Amy Lindel, a church choir singer, heads to the city to make a fortune with her voice, and finds out she can only get jobs cabaret singing. Two men fall for her, one of which plants stolen diamonds on her. Threatened with arrest, she throws herself in a lake. She is saved by the "good guy", whom she marries.

== Cast ==
- Edmund Cobb as Paul Rutledge
- Violet Mersereau as Amy Lindel
- Dorothy Bridges as Oliva Satterlee (née and credited as Dorothy Simpson)
- Verne Layton as Hobart Keith
- S. May Stone as Mrs. Satterlee

== Crew ==
- Otis B. Thayer Managing Director
- Vernon L. Walker Head Cameraman
- H. Haller Murphy Cameraman
