= Robert Ames Bennet =

American writer

- Born: February 3, 1870; Denver, Colorado
- Died: March 11, 1954 (aged 84)
- Occupations: Novelist, screenwriter
- Writing career
- Pen name: Lee Robinet
- Genres: Western, Science fiction

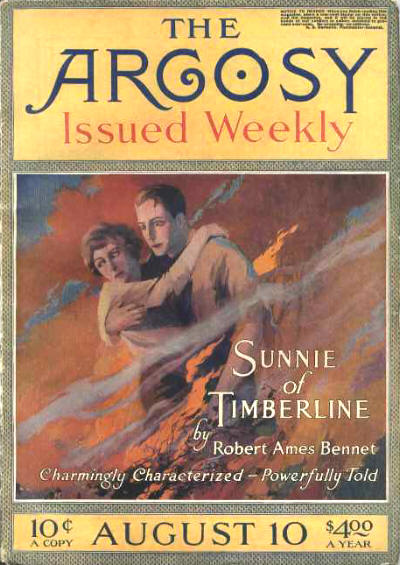
Bennet's "Sunnie of Timberline" was serialized in The Argosy in 1918

Robert Ames Bennet (1870–1954) was an American writer of westerns and science fiction. Early in his career Bennet wrote short stories, drama scripts, and novels for a variety of genres under the pen name Lee Robinet. By the 1930s he was primarily a western writer, penning such stories as Caught in the Wild, Go-Getter Gary, and Guns on the Rio Grande. Several of his novels were made into films, including "Finders Keepers" and "Out of the Depths". His Thyra: A Romance of the Polar Pit is considered a classic of the Lost World genre and is listed in 333: A Bibliography of the Science-Fantasy Novel a collection of the best efforts in Science-Fantasy up to and including 1950.

== Selected works ==
- Thyra: A Romance of the Polar Pit (1901)
- For The White Christ (1905)
- Into The Primitive (1908)
- A Volunteer With Pike (1909)
- The Shogun's Daughter (1910)
- Out of the Primitive (1911)
- Which One? (1912)
- Out of the Depths (1913)
- The Forest Maiden (1913)
- The Quarterbreed (1914)
- The Bowl of Baal (1917)
- The Blond Beast (1918)
- Bloom of Cactus (1920)
- Waters of Strife (1920)
- Tyrrel of the Cow Country (1921)
- Branded (1924)
- The Two-Gun Man (1924)
- The Rough Rider (1925)
- Go-Getter Gary (1926)
- The Desert Girl (1928)
- The Tenderfoot (1928)
- The Sheepmans Gold (1929)
- Ken the Courageous (1930)
- Caught In The Wild (1932)
- Vengeance Valley (1933)
- The Diamond "A" Girl (1933)
- Guns on the Rio Grande (1934)
- The Deadwood Trail (1934)
- The Two-Gun Girl (1934)
- Texas Man (1934)
- White Buffalo (1935)
- Man against Mustang (1936)
- The Brand Blotters (1939)
