= Art-O-Graf =

American film company (1919–1923)

- Industry: Film Production and Distribution
- Founded: 1919; 106 years ago
- Founder: Otis B. Thayer
- Defunct: 1923
- Headquarters: Denver, Colorado,, United States

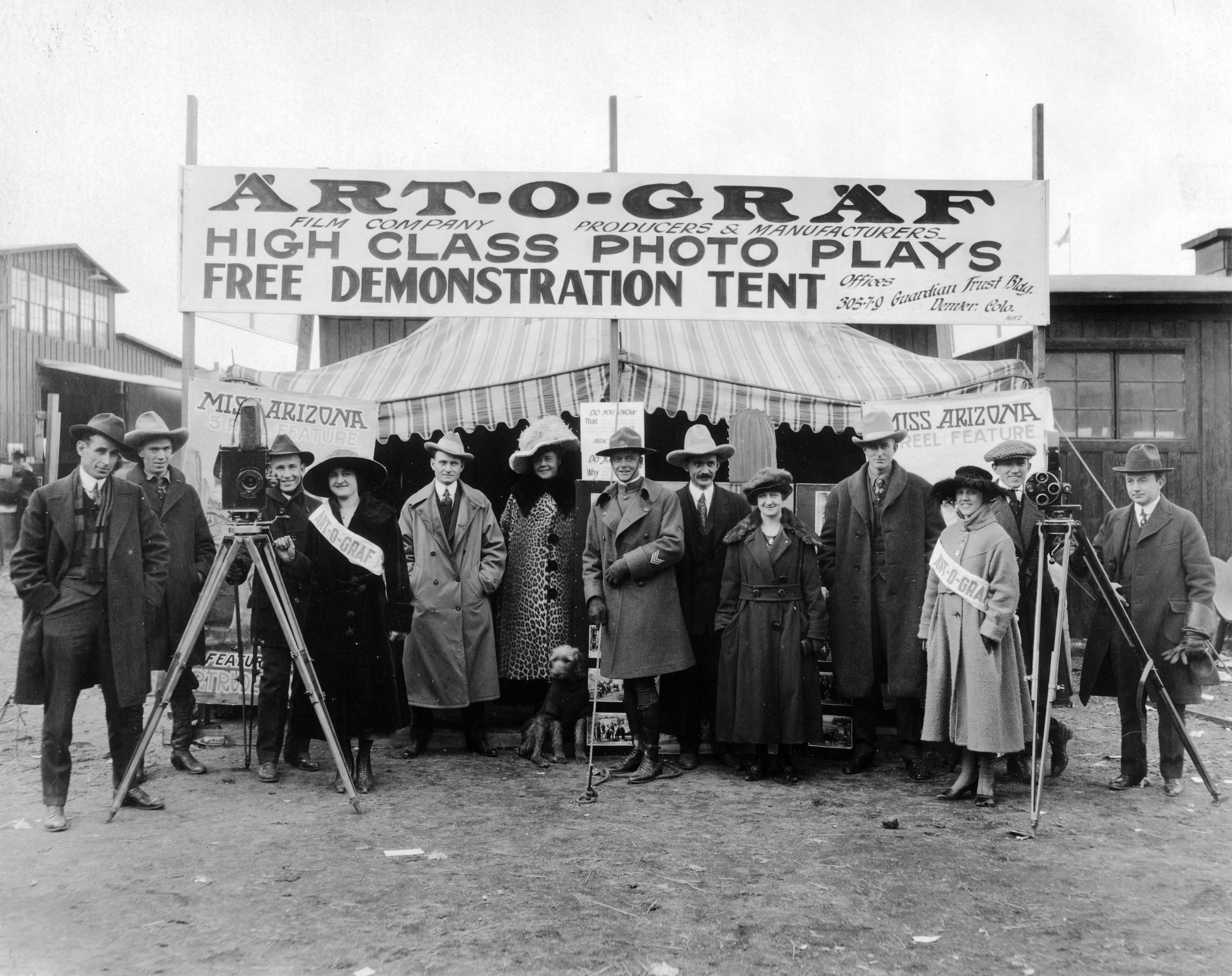
The Art-O-Graf Film Company advertising Miss Arizona. (Left to right: H. Haller Murphy, Man, Man, Woman, David Townsend, Gretchen Wood, Dog, M. Jay Casey, Man, Vida Johnson, Man, Woman, Vernon L. Walker, Otis B. Thayer)

The Art-O-Graf Film Company was an American film production and distribution company founded by Otis B. Thayer that operated between 1919 and 1923 during the silent era. Four time Academy Awards nominee Vernon L. Walker started his career as the head cameraman for the company. Cameraman, William E. Smith, previously worked for Essanay Studios in Chicago. The company had offices in the Guardian Trust Building in Denver, Colorado, and Steamboat Springs, Colorado. The studio was at Englewood, Colorado. The company also filmed in Grand Junction, Colorado and surrounding areas. Many of the films produced by the company are now considered lost, but a number still survive. Perhaps the company's best known film is Wolves of the Street, also known as The Wolves in Wall Street.

== Staff and crew ==
Board of Directors: Alden Van Epps Wessels (owner of the Steamboat Springs Orphium Theatre), Clay Henry Monson, M. Jay Casey, Otis B. Thayer, Gretchen Wood, Lucius Alfred Dick (son of Ohio Senator Charles William Frederick Dick), and David Townsend.

President and General Manager: Otis B. Thayer (1919), M. Jay Casey (1921)
Vice presidents: Gretchen Wood (1919), David Townsend (1921)
Managing Director: Otis B. Thayer
Assistant Manager/Director: Ned Jesse Pease
Scenario Editor: David Townsend (1923)
Head Cameraman: Vernon L. Walker
Cameramen: H. Haller Murphy, William E. Smith
Secretary/Treasurers: Alden VanEpps Wessels, L. Linderman (1919), David Townsend (1919)
Sales Manager: David Townsend (1920)

Rough Riders: A. E. McCormick, Babe Marshall Courvoisier, Charley S. Tipton (formerly with Buffalo Bill's Wild West), Dave Campbell (formerly with Erwin Bros. Wild West show), Fred Shaefer, Lewis Milner, Marion Milner, John Keogh, Ora Keogh, Albert Keogh, Frances Keogh, Lewis Hannan and Thomas Hannan.

== Notes ==
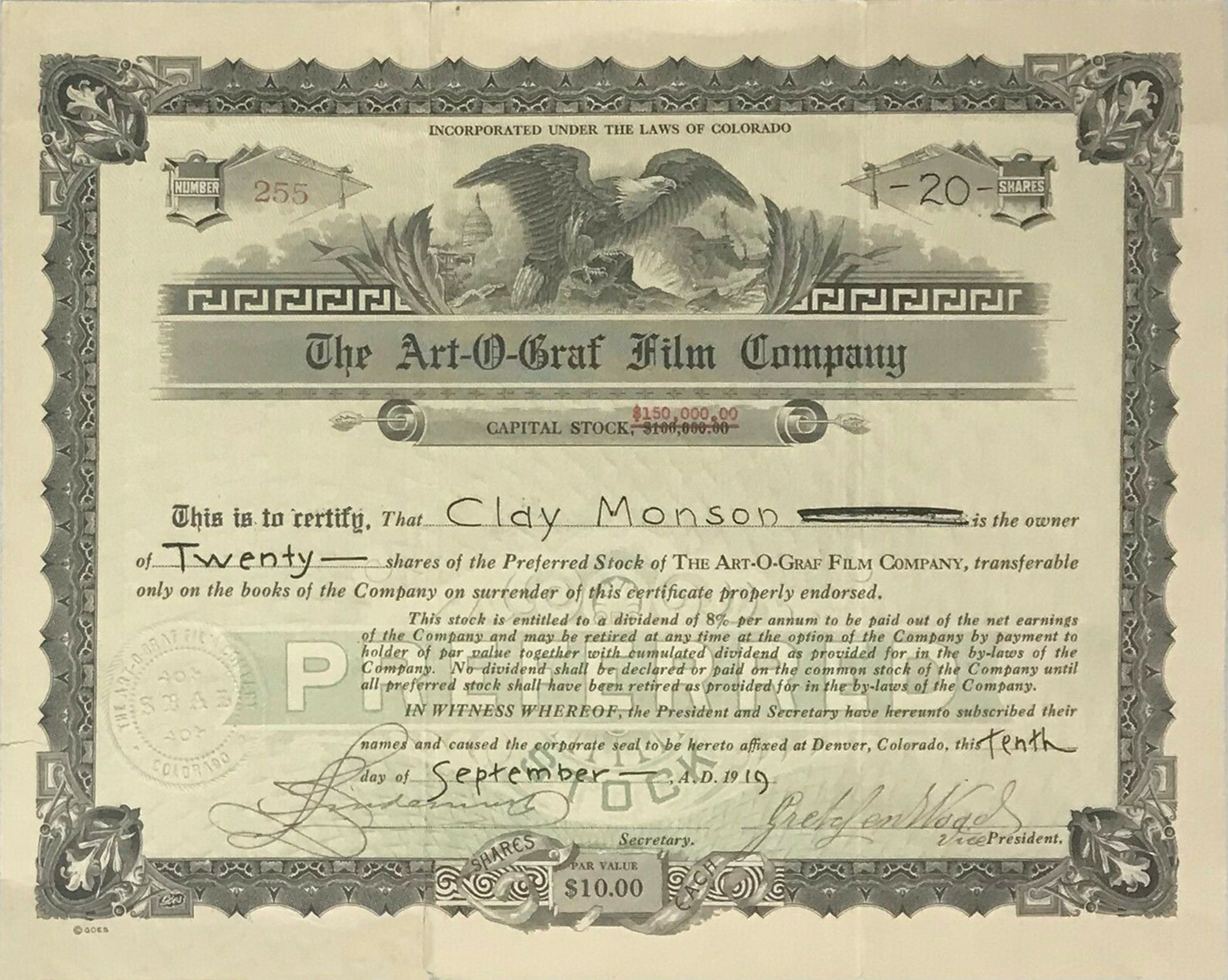
Art-O-Graf Stock Certificate. (Signed by L. Linderman and Gretchen Wood)

In July, 1920 the company was sued for $3,000 in the Supreme Court for breach of contract by Frederick W. Eichorn, scenario writer, who had written a 15-episode serial script, Rado the Invisible, in which Anna Luther was to star. The papers were served on David Townsend who was listed as director of the defendant.

In September, 1921 M. Jay Casey was arrested in Durango, Colorado for passing a fraudulent check. He claimed he had been framed to oust him from the company.

In July, 1923 Mrs. Gretchen Wood was arrested. Her driver had wrecked their car into another automobile causing injury to the three passengers, after which Mrs. Wood’s home was searched and 17 cases of liquor were found.

== Selected filmography ==
- Miss Arizona (1919)
- The Desert Scorpion (1920)
- Wolves of the Street (1920)
- Finders Keepers (1921)
- Out of the Depths (1921)
- Trail's End (1922)
- The Wolf Breed (1922)
- Riders of the Range (1923)
