= Otis B. Thayer =

American actor

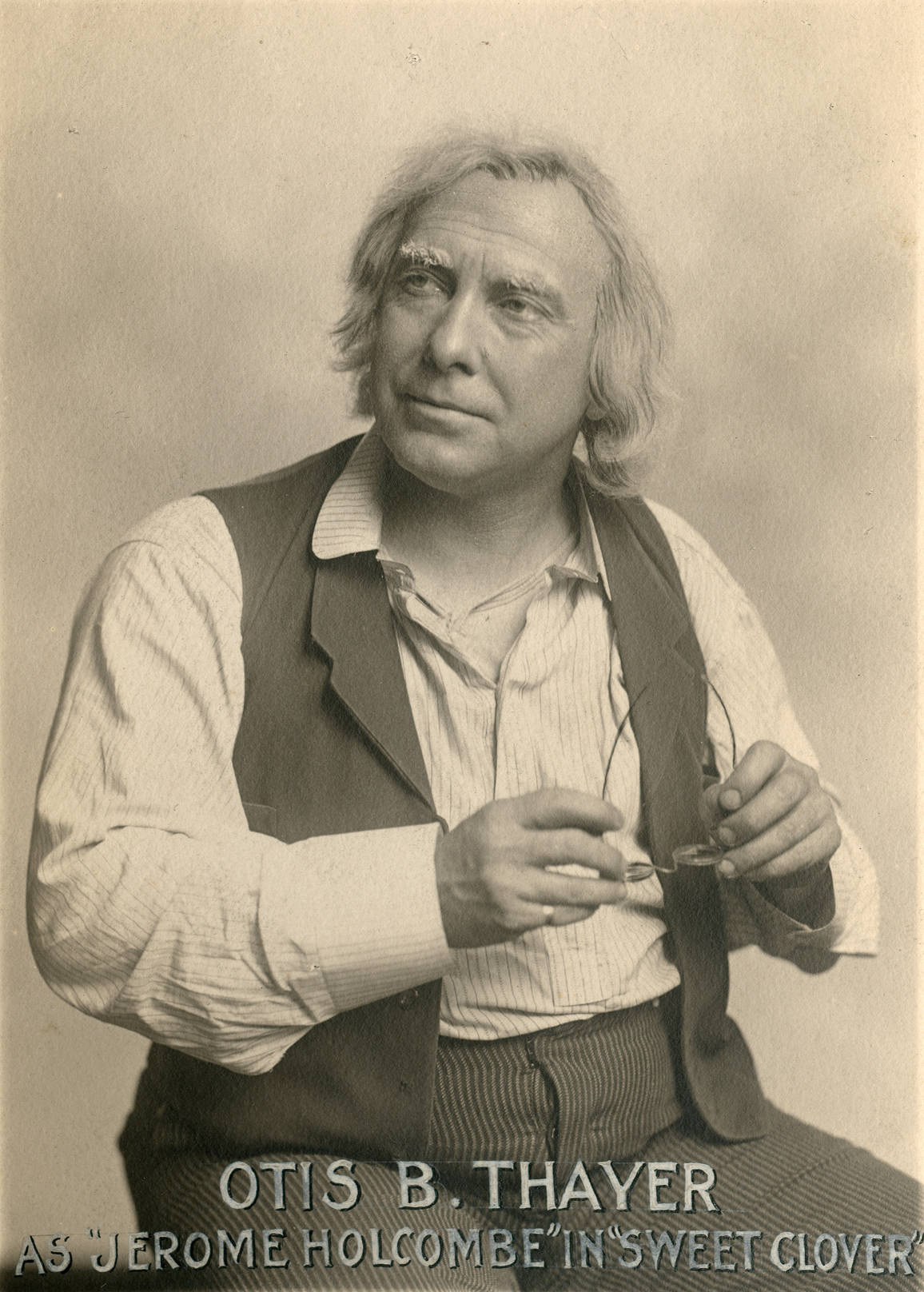
- Born: Otis Bryant Thayer; 1862; Richland Center, Wisconsin, U.S.
- Died: August 16, 1935 (aged 72–73); Los Angeles, California, U.S.
- Other name: Obie
- Occupations: Actor, director
- Years active: 1919 – 1928
- Spouses: Lily Adele Frey (m. 1883) Gertrude M. Cavagna (m. 1903–1935)

Otis Bryant Thayer (1862 – August 16, 1935) was an American actor, director, producer and owner of silent era film production companies. Before his film career he was a stage actor and operatic comedian. By 1910, he piloted the Chicago based Selig Polyscope Company filming westerns on locations at Canon City. He founded the Art-O-Graf film company of Denver in 1919. And by 1920, he was the president of the "Superior Foto Play Company."

== Career ==
As a director

- 1911 - The Bully of Bingo Gulch, A Romance of the Rio Grande, Circumstantial Evidence
- 1912 - An Equine Hero, The Whiskey Runners, A Cowboy's Mother, The Wayfarer, The Boob, An Unexpected Fortune, The Peculiar Nature of the White Man's Burden, The Double Cross, Murray the Masher, The Adopted Son, The Mystery of Room 29, A Citizen in the Making, The Vagabonds, According to Law, Jack and Jingles, Driftwood, His Chance to Make Good, All on Account of Checkers, The Slip, Hypnotized, The 'Diamond S' Ranch, The Horseshoe, The Girl He Left Behind, The Scapegoat (1914 film), A Cowboy's Best Girl, A Modern Ananias, Two Men and a Girl
- 1913 - Saved by the Juvenile Court
- 1914 - Across the Border, Bringing in the Law, The Romance of Copper Gulch, Pirates of the Plains, The Ace of Diamonds, The Range War
- 1915 - Montana Blunt, Out of the Silence, The Word, Told in the Rockies, The Parasite's Double, The Cost, The Greater Barrier
- 1916 - The Unborn, The Awakening of Bess Morton, The Sins That Ye Sin
- 1917 - The Love of Princess Olga, The Prodigal's Return, The Mystery of No. 47, A Social Climber, The Daughter of Gas House Dan, The Evil Sag, Two-Dollar Gloves, A Question of Honesty, Father and Son, The Boob, The Power of Pin Money, The Great Treasure
- 1918 - Little Red Riding Hood
- 1919 - Miss Arizona (1919 Film)
- 1920 - A Desperate Tenderfoot, Wolves of the Street (1920 Film), The Desert Scorpion
- 1921 - Out of the Depths (1921 Film), The Outlaw's Revenge, The Golden Lure, A Western Feud, Finders Keepers (1921 Film)
- 1923 - Riders of the Range (1923 Film)
- 1928 - Tracy the Outlaw, Finders Keepers

As an actor

- 1911 - Western Hearts, Why the Sheriff Is a Bachelor, Told in Colorado, A Tennessee Love Story, A New York Cowboy, A Fair Exchange, The Warrant, Dan Thomas - the Sheriff, Two Lives, The New Editor, The Mission Worker, Montana Anna, A Novel Experiment, Busy Day at the Selig
- 1912 - Circumstantial Evidence, The Wayfarer, The Boob, The Double Cross, Murray the Masher
- 1914 - Pirates of the Plains
- 1920 - The Desert Scorpion

As a writer

- 1911 - The Bully of Bingo Gulch, A Romance of the Rio Grande
- 1912 - The Scapegoat, Riders of the Range

As a producer

- 1928 - Tracy the Outlaw

== Personal life and death ==
Educated in Freeport, Illinois. Son of William Henry Harrison and Letitia Ann (Morgan) Thayer, husband of Gertrude M. Cavagna.

Founder of Art-O-Graf Film Co., and was President and Director for General Superior Foto Play Company.
