= Vernon L. Walker =

American cinematographer

- Born: May 2, 1894; Detroit, Michigan, United States
- Died: March 1, 1948 (aged 53); Los Angeles County, California, United States
- Occupations: Special effects artist, cinematographer
- Years active: 1920–1948

Vernon L. Walker (May 2, 1894 – March 1, 1948) was an American special effects artist and cinematographer. He was nominated for four Academy Awards for Best Special Effects. He worked on more than 220 films during his career, starting out as a head cameraman for Otis B. Thayer's Art-O-Graf Film Company in 1919.

== Selected filmography ==
Walker was nominated for four Academy Awards for his work in special effects:

- Bringing Up Baby (1938)
- Swiss Family Robinson (1940)
- Citizen Kane (1941)
- The Magnificent Ambersons (1942)
- The Navy Comes Through (1942)
- Bombardier (1943)
- Days of Glory (1944)
- The Bells of St. Mary's (1945)
- Notorious (1946)

Walker additionally had extensive credits as a cinematographer in the 1920s and 1930s before fully transitioning to special effects work:

- A Front Page Story (1922)
- The Right of the Strongest (1924)
- The Hansom Cabman (1924)
- Flirty Four-Flushers (1926)
- The Girl from Everywhere (1927)
- The Man from Hard Pan (1927)
- The Long Loop on the Pecos (1927)
- King Kong (1933)
- Son of Kong (1933)
