= Faith Bacon =

American burlesque dancer (1910–1956)

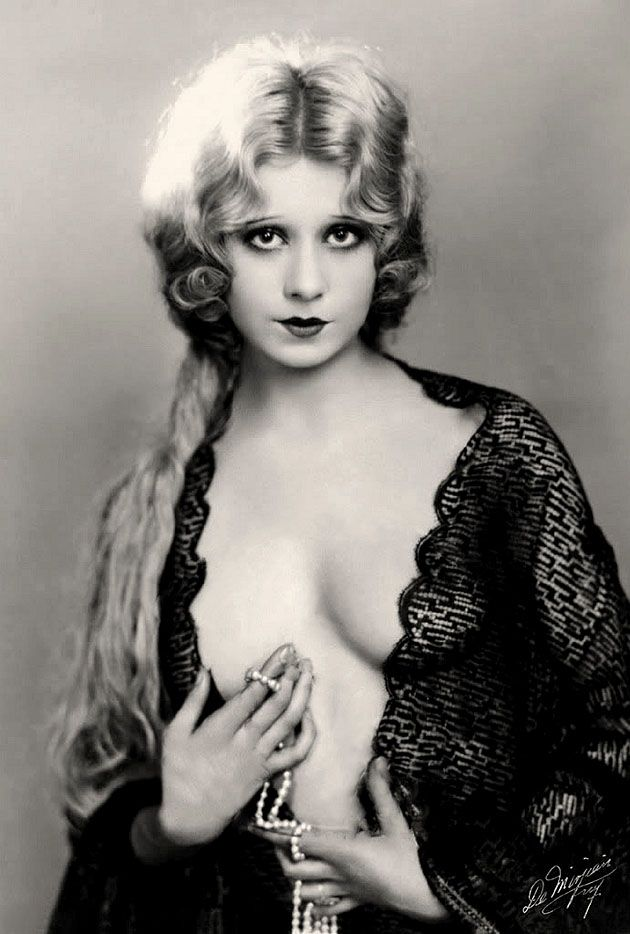
- Portrait by John de Mirjian, before 1929
- Born: Frances Yvonne Bacon; July 19, 1910; Los Angeles, California, U.S.
- Died: September 26, 1956 (aged 46); Chicago, Illinois, U.S.
- Resting place: Wunder's Cemetery, Chicago
- Occupations: Dancer, actress
- Known for: Burlesque dancing

Faith Bacon (born Frances Yvonne Bacon; July 19, 1910 – September 26, 1956) was an American burlesque dancer and actress. During the height of her career, she was billed as "America's Most Beautiful Dancer".

== Personal life ==
Bacon was born Frances Yvonne Bacon in Los Angeles, California to Francis Page Bacon and his wife Charmion, who wed on July 10, 1909. The couple divorced several years later.

In 1945, she and Sanford Hunt Dickinson—a Buffalo businessman and songwriter—applied for a marriage license. As Bacon was rumored to be gay, she may have sought a marriage of convenience. It is unknown whether they ever actually married; they never lived together, but also never divorced. According to Tullah Innes, a burlesque dancer who crossed paths with Faith frequently, Faith was a lesbian out of necessity as her mother kept her from men.

Later in her life, as her work dried up, there were reports of heavy alcohol and drug use.

== Career ==
Bacon's career in burlesque began in the 1920s in Paris. In a 1930 interview, Bacon stated she decided to become a dancer when she visited Paris despite never having had any training. While in Paris, she met Maurice Chevalier and later premiered in his revue. During her career, she used bubbles, flowers and fans in her nude dance routines.

After returning to the United States, Bacon appeared on Broadway in Earl Carroll's Vanities from August 1928 to February 1929. The program listed her performance as "Fan Dance - Heart of the Daisies." She went on to dance in Fioretta and Earl Carroll's Sketch Book, in 1929 and 1930, respectively. In July 1930, she appeared as a "principal nude" in another production of Earl Carroll's Vanities. She initially performed a routine in which she stood nude and motionless onstage while lights "played over" her body. At the time, indecent exposure laws prohibited dancers from moving while appearing nude onstage. According to Bacon, she and Carroll tried several different tricks to get around these laws before finally coming up with the idea of the fan dance. The dance was an immediate hit.

On July 9, 1930, police raided the New Amsterdam Theatre and arrested Bacon, Earl Carroll and other cast members for "giving an indecent performance". She was appearing in a scene entitled "A Window at Merls". Although the show underwent some changes after the raid, Bacon continued to perform the fan dance. However, Earl Carroll stated that Bacon wore a "chiffon arrangement" during the performance and was not fully nude. In August 1930, a grand jury decided against indicting Bacon, Carroll and her fellow cast members.

Following her performance in Earl Carroll's Vanities, Bacon appeared in the Ziegfeld Follies of 1931 from July to November 1931. In 1933, she went to Chicago to perform at the 1933 World's Fair after learning that rival dancer Sally Rand was performing a fan dance. Bacon, who maintained she originated the dance for Earl Carroll in 1930, billed herself as "The Original Fan Dancer". At the 1939 World's Fair in New York, she had an official position as fan dancer.

=== Decline ===
After appearing at the World's Fair in 1933, Bacon's career began to decline. Over the years, she had gained a reputation of being difficult. While working in the show Temptations in the winter of 1936 at the Lake Theater in Chicago, Bacon cut her thighs when she fell through a glass drum on which she was posing nude. The cuts left her thighs scarred and she sued the Lake Theater Corporation for $100,000 in damages. She later settled for $5,000 which she spent on a ten carat diamond. The accident scars and ensuing leg pain diminished her dancing abilities.

In October 1938, Bacon sued dancer Sally Rand for $375,000 in damages and sought an injunction barring her from performing the fan dance which Bacon still maintained that she originated. Rand denied Bacon's accusations, claiming jealousy. Rand stated, "The fan idea is as old as Cleopatra. [...] She can't sue me for that."

In 1938, Bacon made her only acting film appearance in Prison Train, directed by Gordon Wiles, in which she played the role of 'Maxine'. She did appear on film in 1942 in two short recordings: "Lady with the Fans" and "Dance of Shame". On April 23, 1939, she was arrested for a second time for disorderly conduct after staging a publicity stunt on Park Avenue in New York City. Bacon, who was scheduled to do a "Fawn Dance" at the 1939 New York World's Fair the following week, dressed in "wisps of chiffon" and maple leaves while walking a fawn on a leash. She was released on $500 bond. A review of her dance at the time stated "Faith Bacon parades through a moth-eaten fan dance that has lost its punch long ago."

Throughout the 1940s, Bacon continued to perform her act at clubs and venues throughout the United States. In 1948, she was hired to headline a girl review, however on the last day of the performance she claimed she was owed $5,044 in back salary. She claimed the owner tried to terrorize her and sued the carnival promoter for $55,444, accusing him of putting tacks on the stage on which she was dancing barefoot. Bacon lost the case.

By the mid-1950s, she attempted to start a dance school in Indiana but that failed and she was found unconscious after reportedly overdosing on sleeping pills. After that, Bacon was unable to secure employment and ran out of money. Elaine Stuart, a dancer who previously worked with Bacon, was with her husband when she recognized Bacon in an alley as the couple were leaving through a stage door at a theatre in Seattle, Washington. In Burlesque: Legendary Stars of the Stage, Elaine's husband Lee Stuart described the encounter:

We came out the stage door of the Rivoli Theatre in Seattle after the midnight show. Off to one side in the alley, in the shadows, stood what we would now call a bag lady. We started past her when my wife pulled up short and said 'My God, Faith?' Needless to say it was Faith Bacon. She was down on her luck and needed a handout. My wife gave her some money and talked with her a few minutes, but [Faith] seemed to be in a hurry. [She] shuffled away, after promising to drop backstage the next day to visit. We never saw her again.

By 1956, Bacon was living in Erie, Pennsylvania but decided to travel to Chicago to find work. Upon arriving, she checked into a hotel and spent three weeks looking for work but could not find any.

== Death ==
On September 26, 1956, Bacon jumped out of her window at the Alan Hotel at 2004 Lincoln Park West in Chicago, falling two stories before landing on the roof of an adjacent building. Bacon's roommate, grocery store clerk Ruth Bishop, tried to intervene by grabbing Bacon's skirt as she climbed out of the window but Bacon tore free of her grasp. She suffered a fractured skull, perforated lung and internal injuries; she died of her injuries at Grant Hospital later that night.

Bishop later said that Bacon appeared to be depressed before her death. Bishop stated, "She wanted to get back into the spotlight. She would have taken any work in show biz." At the time of her death, Bacon had no money and was estranged from her husband, songwriter Sanford Hunt Dickinson. The inventory of her possessions included clothing, one white metal ring, train ticket to Erie, Pennsylvania, and 85 cents. The American Guild of Variety Artists claimed her body and arranged for burial. She was buried in Wunder's Cemetery in Chicago.
