= Renee C. Hanover =

American lawyer

- Born: Renee C. Marcus; April 18, 1926; New York City
- Died: January 5, 2011 (aged 84)
- Occupation: Lawyer

Renee C. Hanover (born Marcus, April 18, 1926 - January 5, 2011) was an American lawyer and civil rights advocate who practiced in Chicago. As a lawyer, she defended groups and individuals involved in civil rights cases dealing with gender, LGBT issues and race. She was part of the Women's Law Center and fought for intersectional equality. Hanover was one of the first openly gay lawyers to practice in the United States.

== Biography ==
Hanover was born to immigrant parents in New York City on April 18, 1926. She moved to Chicago with her husband and son in 1952. In Chicago she worked for some time as part of the Communist Party. She later got divorced and decided she wanted to become a lawyer. Hanover had been an out lesbian since the 1960s. She put herself through college and then law school; while a single mother of three children. She was dismissed from law school for being a lesbian four months before she was going to graduate in 1964. However, she went back and graduated from John Marshall Law School in 1969. Hanover was admitted to the Illinois bar in the same year. She was considered one of the first "out" lawyers in the United States.

Hanover and another lawyer and former classmate, Gabrielle P. Pieper, shared offices in the Stock Exchange Building until around May 1972, when they both decided to get new quarters and to begin focusing their legal practice on women. The firm was called the Women's Law Center and was located in the Civic Center in Chicago. Hanover's mentor at the firm was lawyer Pearl M. Hart. Both Hanover and Pieper had been students of Hart when she taught at John Marshall Law School.

In 1973, Hanover was the defense attorney for four young men who were arrested and charged for cross-dressing and underage drinking. Hanover's defense was used to help show that violations against cross-dressing violated the Illinois and United States Constitutions. During her law career she defended members of the Blackstone Rangers and other black power activists when they were accused of "trumped-up criminal charges." She also defended the "D.C. 12," gay men who were arrested in Washington D.C. when they went to attend a 1970 Black Panthers convention.

She was involved in the July 1961 "freedom wade-in" to support the desegregation of the beaches in Chicago. Hanover spoke at the 1977 protest against Anita Bryant, an anti-gay rights activist and singer. She also was involved in the 1987 March on Washington, where she was arrested in a protest in front of the Supreme Court.

Hanover was inducted into the Chicago Gay and Lesbian Hall of Fame in 1991. She moved to Los Angeles in 2000 to be closer to her daughter. She died on January 5, 2011, and was buried in Chicago's Wunder's Cemetery.
