= Dorothy Comingore =

American actress (1913–1971)

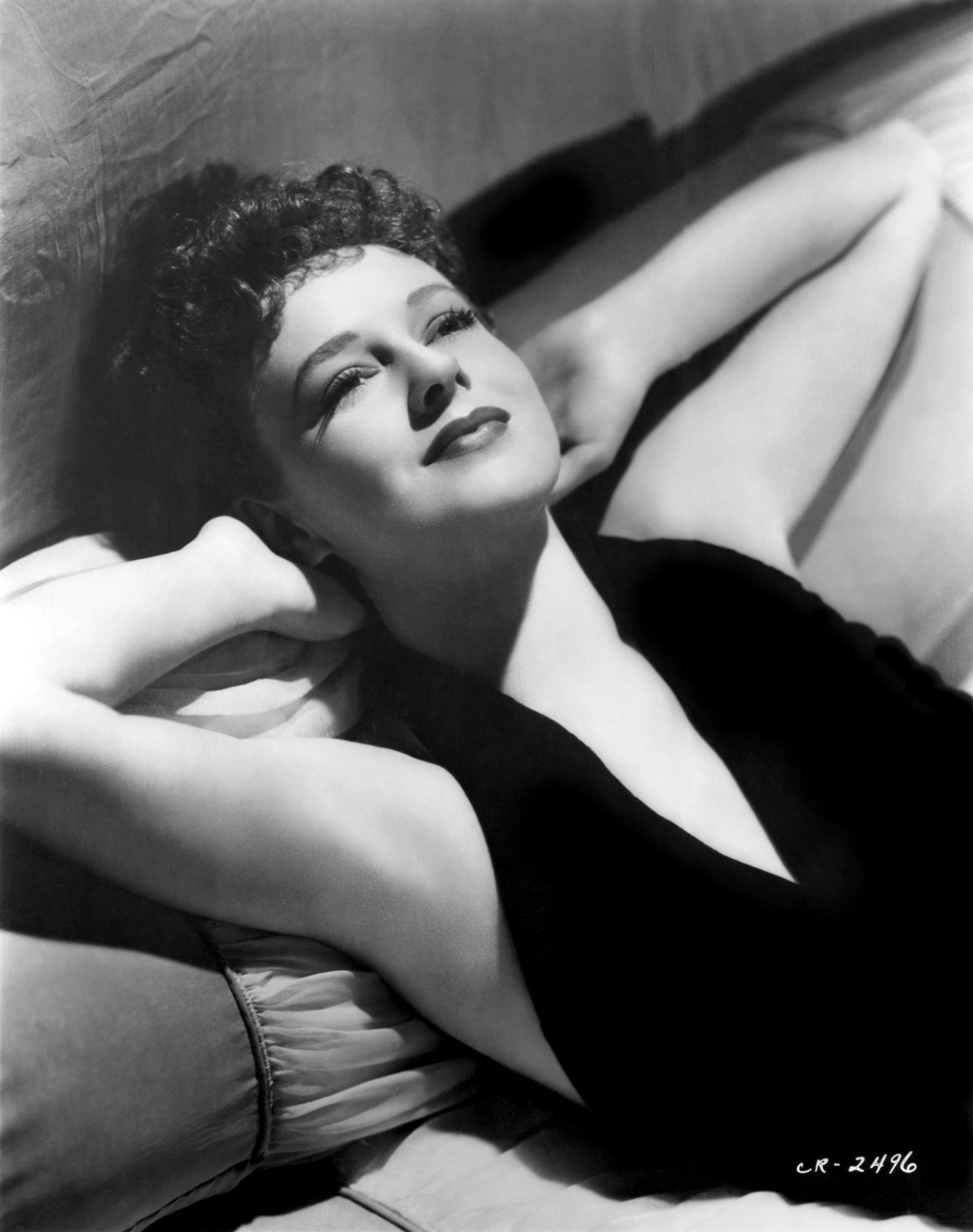
- Dorothy Comingore in 1941
- Born: Margaret Louise Comingore; August 24, 1913; Los Angeles, California, U.S.
- Died: December 30, 1971 (aged 58); Stonington, Connecticut, U.S.
- Other names: Kay Winters; Linda Winters
- Occupation: Actress
- Years active: 1938–1952
- Spouse(s): Robert Meltzer (m. 1937, divorced) Richard J. Collins (m. 1939; div. 1946) Theodore Strauss (m. 1947; div. 1952) John Crowe (m. 1962)
- Children: 3

Margaret Louise Comingore (August 24, 1913 – December 30, 1971), known professionally as Dorothy Comingore, was an American stage and film actress. When starting out in minor film roles, she was billed as Linda Winters. Before that, she appeared on stage and on radio as Kay Winters. Her breakthrough as an actress came when she starred as Susan Alexander Kane in Citizen Kane (1941), the critically acclaimed debut film of Orson Welles. However, her acting career was ended prematurely in 1951 by the Hollywood blacklist. The following year she refused to answer questions or "name names" when called before the House Un-American Activities Committee.

== Early years ==
Margaret Louise Comingore was born in Los Angeles, but spent most of her childhood in Oakland, California. In one of her first mentions in a newspaper, she was described as "a one-time Oakland school girl." Her father William Paxton Comingore was an electrotyper. He was also a union organizer, which influenced her political education. Her older sister Lucille operated a San Francisco nightclub. Comingore attended the University of California, Berkeley where she studied philosophy.

== Film career ==
She lived for a while in Taos, New Mexico, and then returned to California to work in the theater. In March 1938, she was noticed by Charles Chaplin in Carmel, California, when she was acting in a small playhouse alongside her love interest (and probable husband) at the time, Robert Meltzer. Chaplin was impressed with both of them and urged them to relocate to Hollywood. Whether Chaplin played a significant role in Comingore's subsequent film career is questionable. In an April 1938 profile in the Oakland Tribune, she denied being his protégé and indicated that press reports had exaggerated the limited contact she had with him and one of his assistants, Tim Durant.

However, the encounter with Chaplin did stimulate her interest in film acting. Through a friend at the Carmel theater, she obtained a Hollywood agent who got her a screen test, and from there she secured a contract with Warner Bros. Initially, she played mostly bit parts, sometimes uncredited, in a series of "B movies" until Orson Welles cast her as Susan Alexander, the second wife of press tycoon Charles Foster Kane, in his debut feature film Citizen Kane (1941). By now she had switched from "Linda Winters" to her original surname "Dorothy Comingore". Her performance garnered glowing reviews. The Los Angeles Times singled out Comingore as "an important acquisition for pictures". The Hollywood Reporter wrote that she "is put through a range of emotions that would try any actress one could name, but she delivers without a second's let-down. Citizen Kane should make this girl a star."

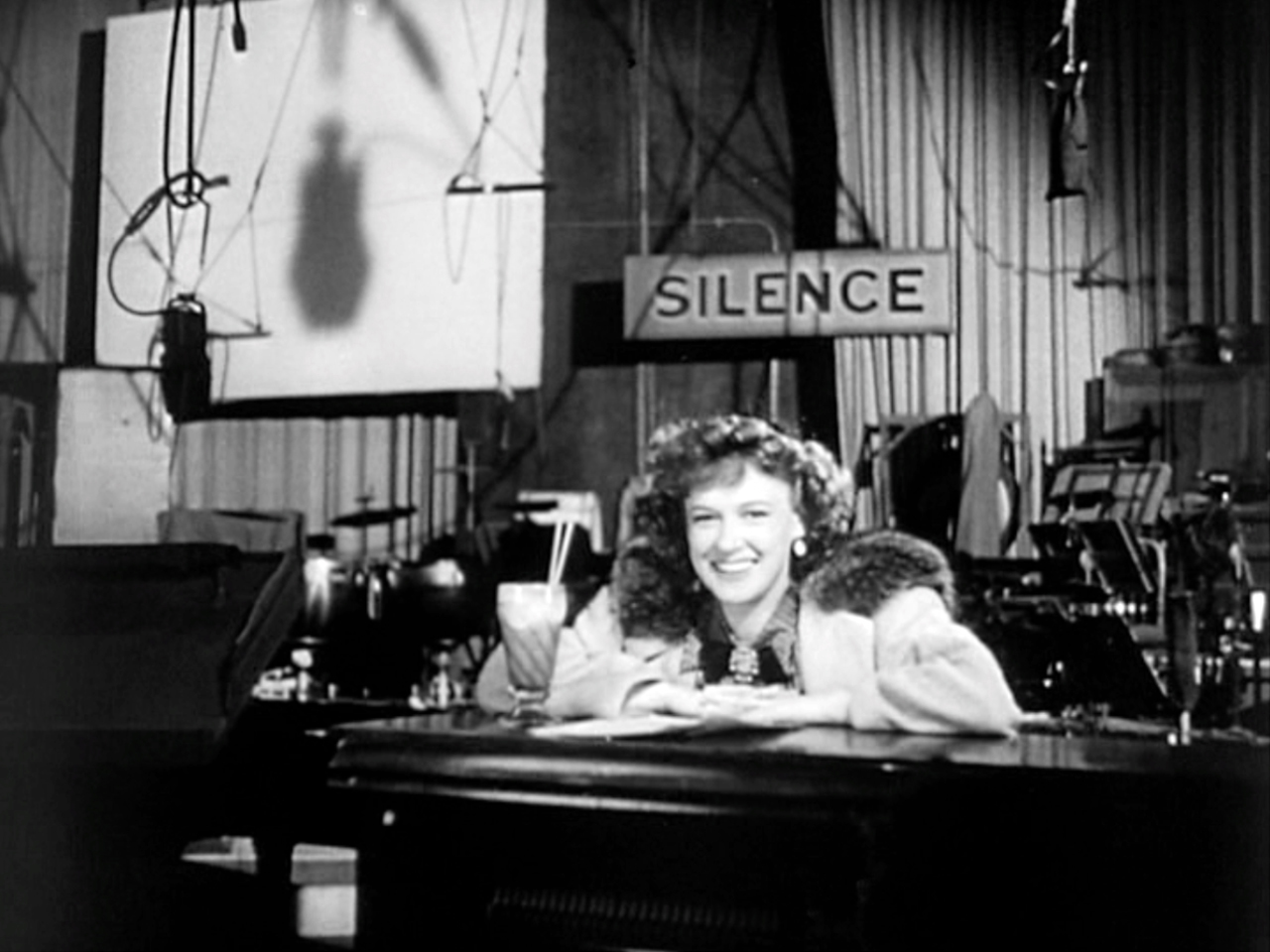
Dorothy Comingore on the set of Citizen Kane in the trailer for the film (1940)

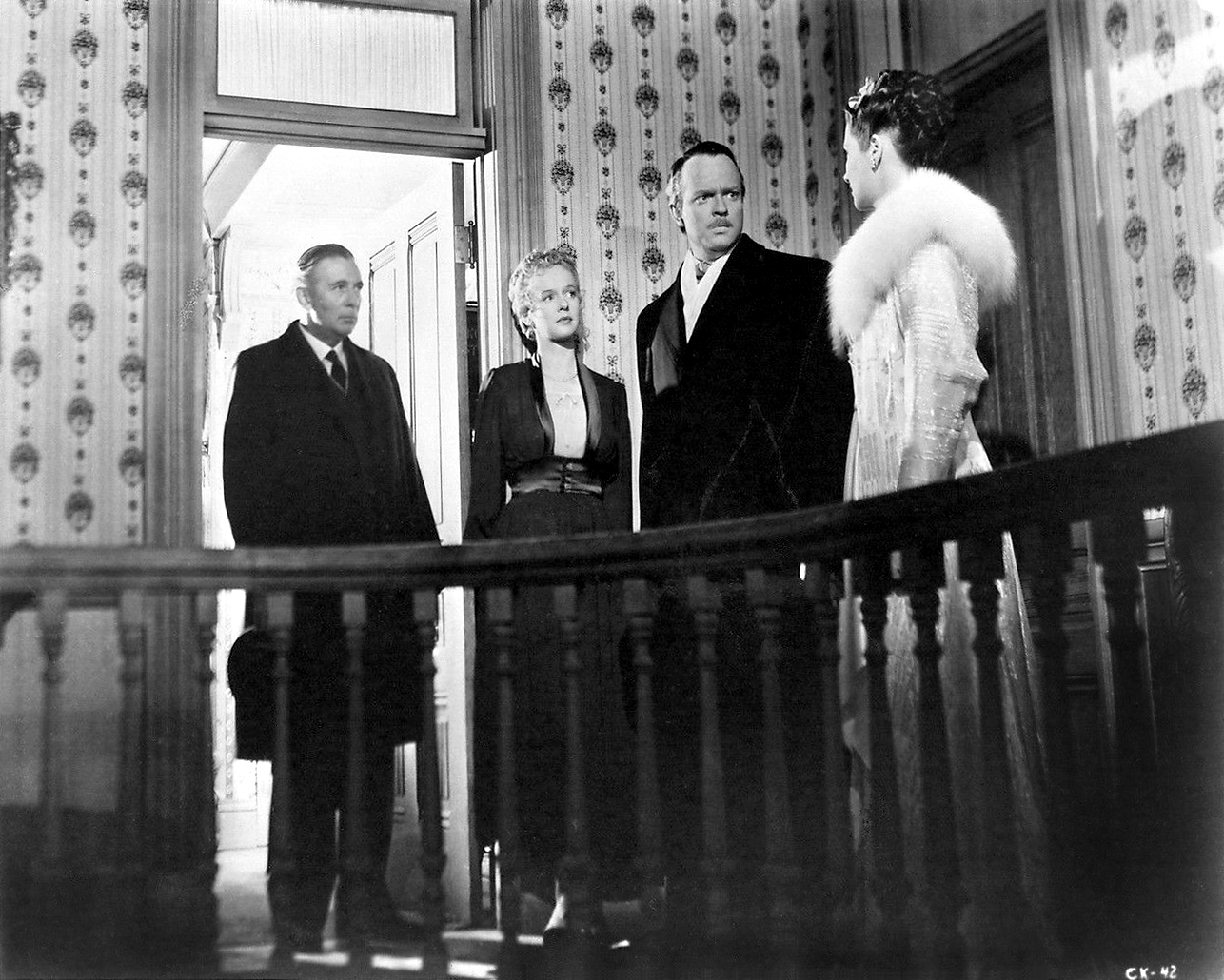
Ray Collins, Dorothy Comingore, Orson Welles and Ruth Warrick in Citizen Kane

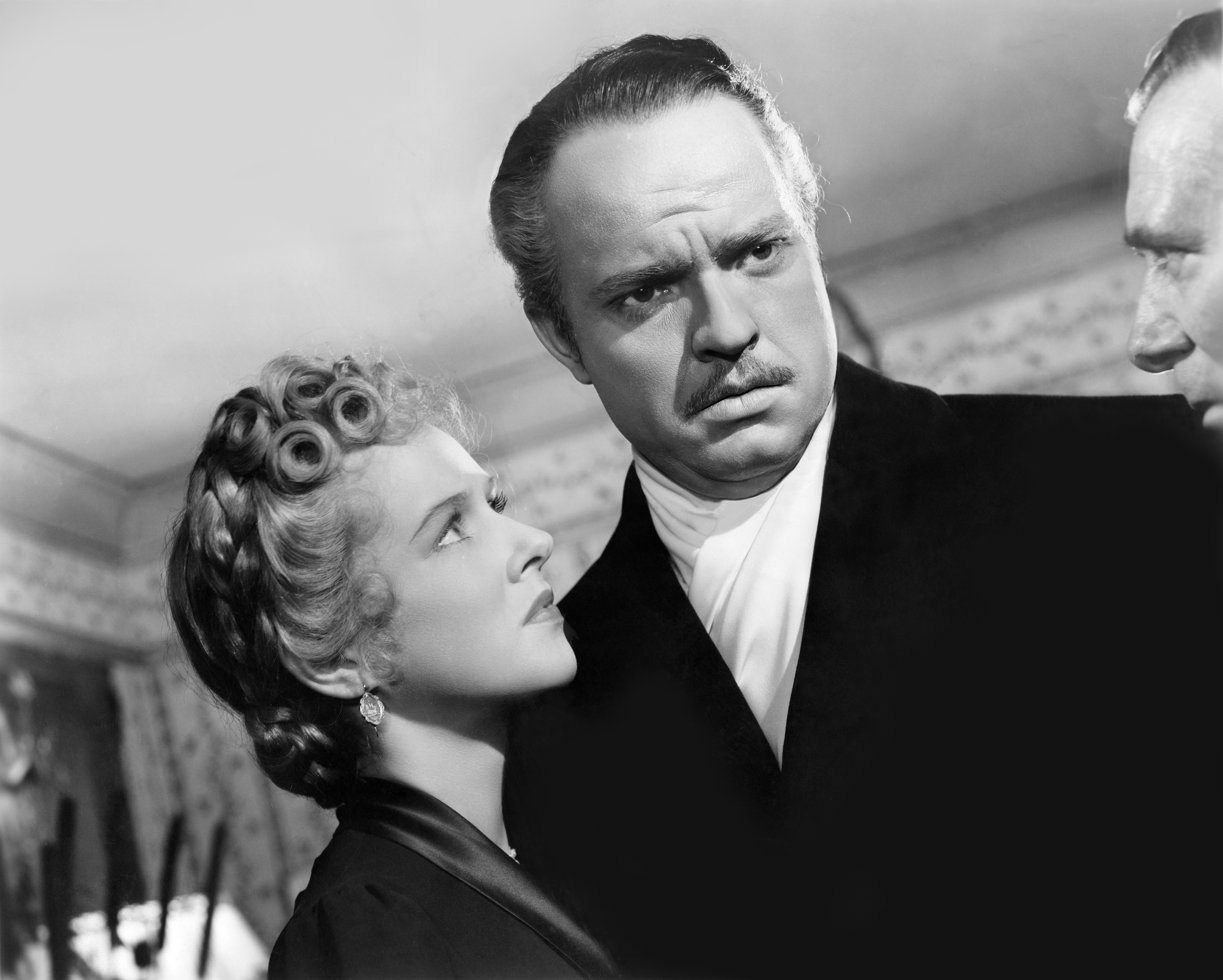
Dorothy Comingore, Orson Welles and Ray Collins in Citizen Kane

In demand from other studios but denied loanouts by her new studio employer, RKO Pictures, Comingore fell ill, was ordered to go on bed rest, was suspended by RKO, and found no suitable work on her return. William Randolph Hearst's newspapers had meanwhile damaged her reputation by claiming she possessed Communist leanings. She ended up on a government watch list for "distributing Communist literature to negroes." She had also canvassed door-to-door for actor and State Assembly hopeful Albert Dekker; worked with musician Lead Belly and singer Paul Robeson to desegregate whites-only USO clubs; signed on as a co-sponsor of the Sleepy Lagoon Defense Committee; and promoted "union solidarity". A few years later, when the House Un-American Activities Committee (HUAC) gained ascendancy, and the FBI had amassed a "thick" file on her political activities, she became a target.

Kathleen Sharp wrote that as a consequence of Citizen Kane, the actress "also had acquired a powerful enemy – the 78-year-old Hearst. The media mogul so hated Dorothy's portrayal of his mistress, 44-year-old Marion Davies, that he used his chain of newspapers and radio stations to smear the young woman. Hearst's columnists Hedda Hopper and Walter Winchell publicly accused Dorothy of belonging to the 'Party', in this case the Communist Party, and borrowed Orwellian 'newspeak' to malign her."

Comingore's supposed CPUSA connections harmed her in the highly publicized legal battle she waged against her ex-husband, screenwriter Richard J. Collins, for custody of their son and daughter. A former CPUSA member, Collins volunteered to testify before the HUAC and named over twenty colleagues as Communists. As a result of his cooperative testimony, and because Comingore was accused of being an unfit mother, he won the custody battle.

According to Peter Bogdanovich's DVD commentary on Citizen Kane, Comingore hindered her growth as an actress by refusing too many roles that she felt were uninteresting. This occurred in the wake of her Citizen Kane success—and before she was derailed by personal and political troubles—when parts were still being offered to her. For example, she passed on the chance to star in an adaptation of the Damon Runyon story, "Little Pinks" (it was made instead with Lucille Ball in 1942 under the title The Big Street). That incident came after she turned down assignments in Unexpected Uncle (1941) and Valley of the Sun (1942), which triggered her RKO suspension. She did appear in the film version of the Eugene O'Neill play The Hairy Ape (1944) with William Bendix, Susan Hayward, and John Loder. Comingore's last movie credit was a supporting role in The Big Night (1951).

Her career effectively came to a halt in 1951 when she was victimized by the Hollywood blacklist. The following year, she was summoned to testify before the HUAC about her reputed CPUSA connections. She opted to be an "unfriendly witness" who declined on constitutional grounds to answer questions or name names. She was then accused in child custody hearings of being a heavy drinker, and on March 19, 1953, she was arrested for "solicitation", i.e., prostitution, in West Hollywood. The arrest was suspected by some to have been a frameup orchestrated by the local L.A. vice squad in coordination with the HUAC. Comingore shared this suspicion, asserting in the press shortly afterwards that her arrest was "part of my being an 'unfriendly witness.'" In exchange for having the solicitation charge dropped, she had to agree to be committed to Camarillo State Mental Hospital, where she was institutionalized for approximately two years.

She never acted on stage or screen again. In the 1960s, when Professor Howard Suber of the UCLA School of Theater, Film and Television was researching the history of the Citizen Kane screenplay, Comingore was one of the film's participants he interviewed. His research was later used by Pauline Kael for her controversial 1971 essay, "Raising Kane". A copy of the Comingore interview is in the Lilly Library collection at Indiana University Bloomington.

== Personal life ==
Comingore was married briefly in the late 1930s to actor-writer Robert Meltzer. She then married screenwriter Richard Collins. They had two children and were divorced in 1946. Her other husbands were screenwriter Theodore Strauss, with whom she had one child; and John W. Crowe, a rural postal carrier and the owner of a small store called the "Crowe's Nest" in Lords Point, Connecticut. She met him in 1957 and they remained together until her death in 1971.

Comingore struggled with alcohol abuse during her later years, to the extent that she lost custody of her two children with Collins. Alcoholism was also believed to have shortened her life.

== Death ==
Although Comingore was mostly confined in her final years by arthritis and failing health, she was said to have found relative contentment during that time while living in seclusion in her seaside home with her husband John Crowe.

Comingore died of pulmonary disease on December 30, 1971, in Stonington, Connecticut. She was 58. Her ashes were scattered in multiple locations. As of 2026, there was no monument or plaque to mark her death. Her descendants and fans were seeking to erect a Dorothy Comingore memorial.

== Cultural references ==
In Guilty by Suspicion, Irwin Winkler's 1991 film set during the Hollywood blacklist, Comingore inspired the character of Dorothy Nolan, an actress who is harassed by the HUAC. Besides losing acting work, she loses custody of her son and suffers a mental breakdown under the strain. She eventually commits suicide. Nolan was portrayed by Patricia Wettig.

== Radio credits ==
Date	Title	Episode	Notes
June 12, 1938	Warner Bros. Academy Theatre	"Desirable"	Credited as Kay Winters
June 26, 1938	Warner Bros. Academy Theatre	"The House on 56th Street"	Credited as Kay Winters
October 6, 1941	The Orson Welles Show	"The Black Pearl"	

== Film and television credits ==
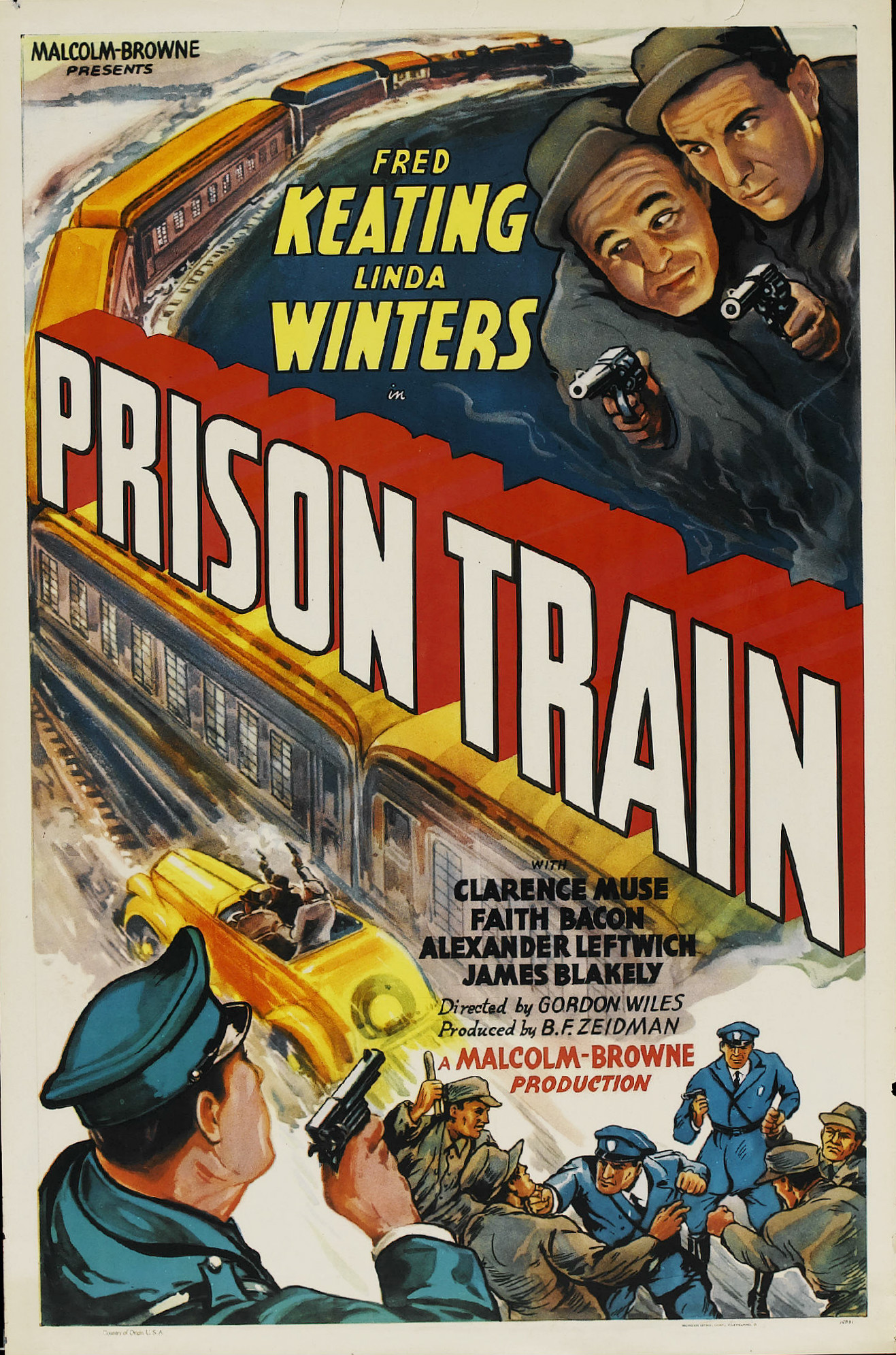
Poster for Prison Train (1938)

Year	Title	Role	Notes
1938	Campus Cinderella	Co-ed	Uncredited, Short film
1938	Prison Train	Louise Terris	Credited as Linda Winters
1938	Comet Over Broadway	Miss McDermott	Credited as Linda Winters
1938	Trade Winds	Ann	Credited as Linda Winters
1939	Blondie Meets the Boss	Francis Rogers	Credited as Linda Winters
1939	Romance of the Redwoods	Bit Role	Credited as Linda Winters
1939	North of the Yukon	Jean Duncan	Credited as Linda Winters
1939	Outside These Walls	2nd secretary	Credited as Linda Winters
1939	Good Girls Go to Paris	Tearoom Hostess	Uncredited
1939	Coast Guard	Nurse	Credited as Linda Winters
1939	Five Little Peppers and How They Grew	Nurse	Credited as Linda Winters
1939	Golden Boy	Fight Spectator	Uncredited
1939	Oily to Bed, Oily to Rise	June Jenkins	Short film, credited as Linda Winters
1939	Scandal Sheet	Marjorie Lawe	Credited as Linda Winters
1939	Mr. Smith Goes to Washington	Woman at Station	Credited as Linda Winters
1939	The Awful Goof	Charley's Fiancee	Short film, credited as Linda Winters
1939	Cafe Hostess	Tricks	Credited as Linda Winters
1940	Convicted Woman	May	Credited as Linda Winters
1940	Pioneers of the Frontier	Joan Darcey	Credited as Linda Winters
1940	The Heckler	Ole's Girlfriend	Short film, credited as Linda Winters
1940	Rockin' thru the Rockies	Daisy	Short film, credited as Linda Winters
1940	Citizen Kane trailer	Herself, Susan Alexander	Short film
1941	Citizen Kane	Susan Alexander Kane	
1944	The Hairy Ape	Helen Parker	
1949	Any Number Can Play	Mrs. Purcell	
1951	The Big Night	Julie Rostina	
1951	Fireside Theatre (TV)	Rita	One episode, "Handcuffed"
1952	Rebound (TV)	Dotty	One episode, "The Losers"
1952	The Doctor (TV)		One episode, "The Red Wig"
