= Citizen Kane trailer =

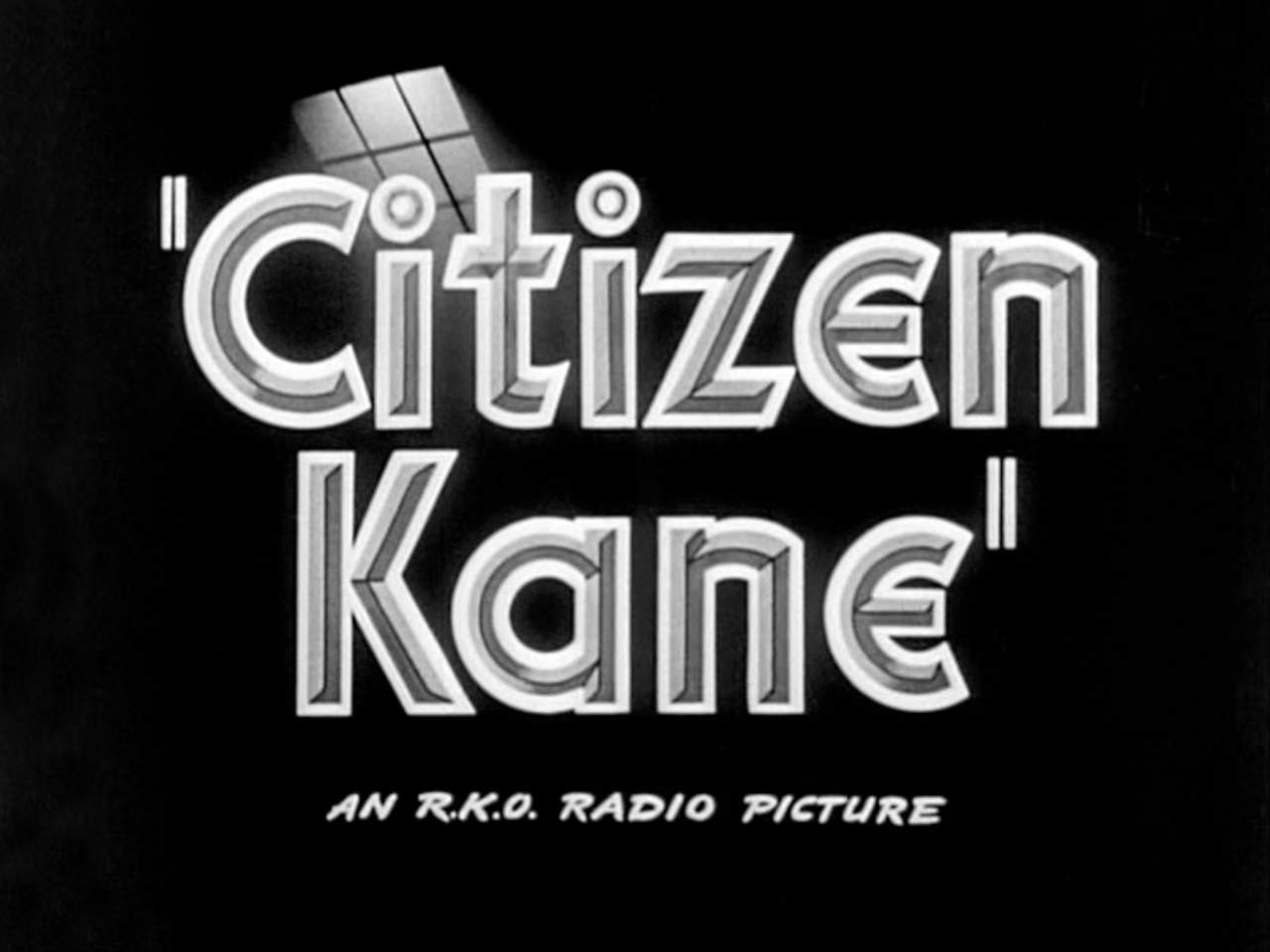
- Ending title card
- Directed by: Orson Welles
- Written by: Orson Welles
- Produced by: Orson Welles
- Starring: Ray Collins; Joseph Cotten; Everett Sloane
- Narrated by: Orson Welles
- Cinematography: Harry J. Wild
- Production company: Mercury Productions
- Distributed by: RKO Radio Pictures
- Release date: 1940
- Running time: 4 minutes
- Country: United States
- Language: English

Citizen Kane trailer

The trailer for Citizen Kane, a 1941 drama film by Orson Welles, is a four-minute, self-contained, "making of" promotional short film by Orson Welles and the Mercury Theatre, released in 1940 to promote the film. Unlike other standard theatrical trailers of the era, it did not feature any footage of the actual film itself, but was a wholly original pseudo-documentary piece. It is considered by numerous film scholars such as Simon Callow, Joseph McBride and Jonathan Rosenbaum to be a standalone short film, rather than a conventional trailer, and to represent an important stage in developing Welles's directorial style.

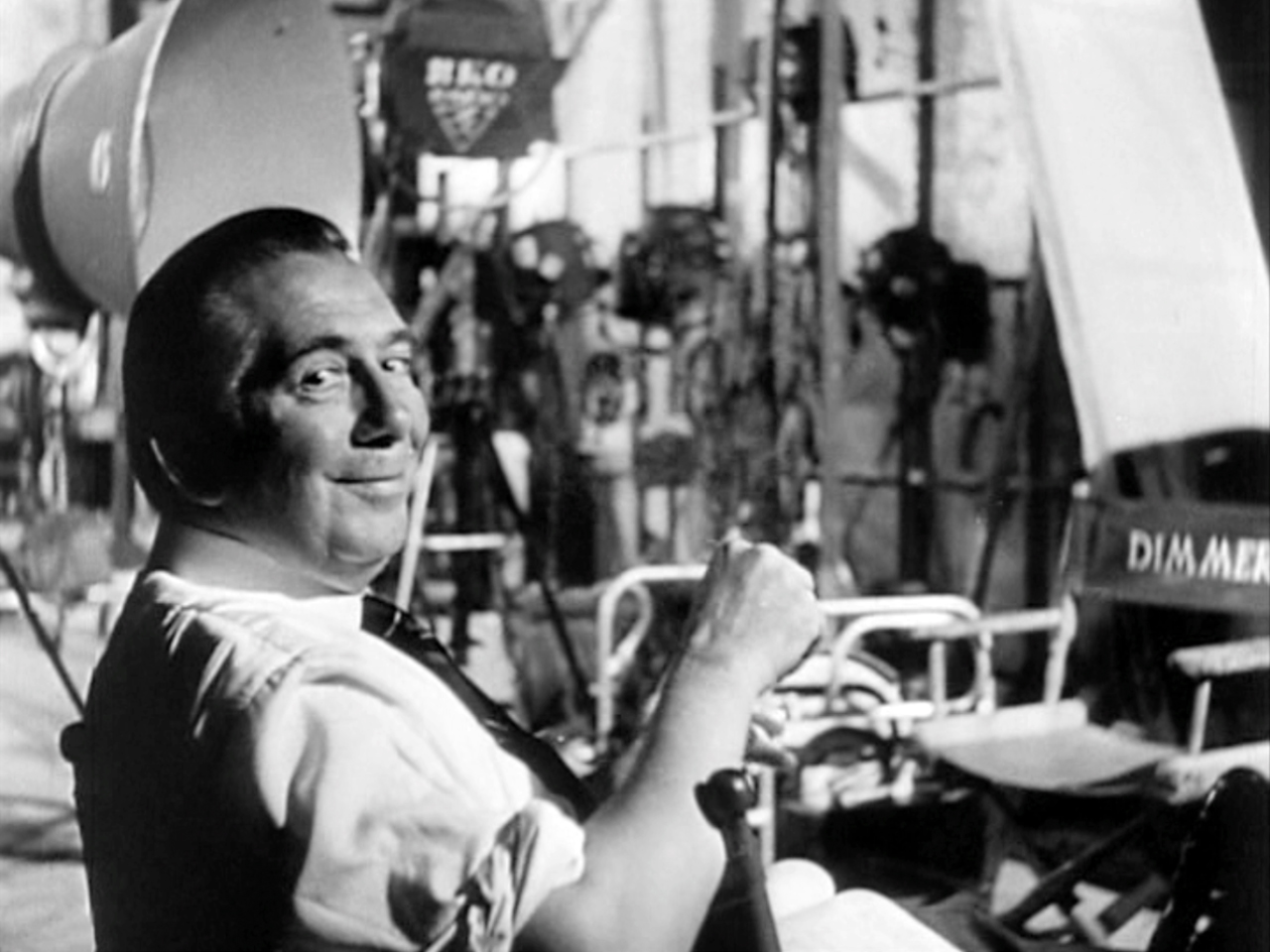
Ray Collins

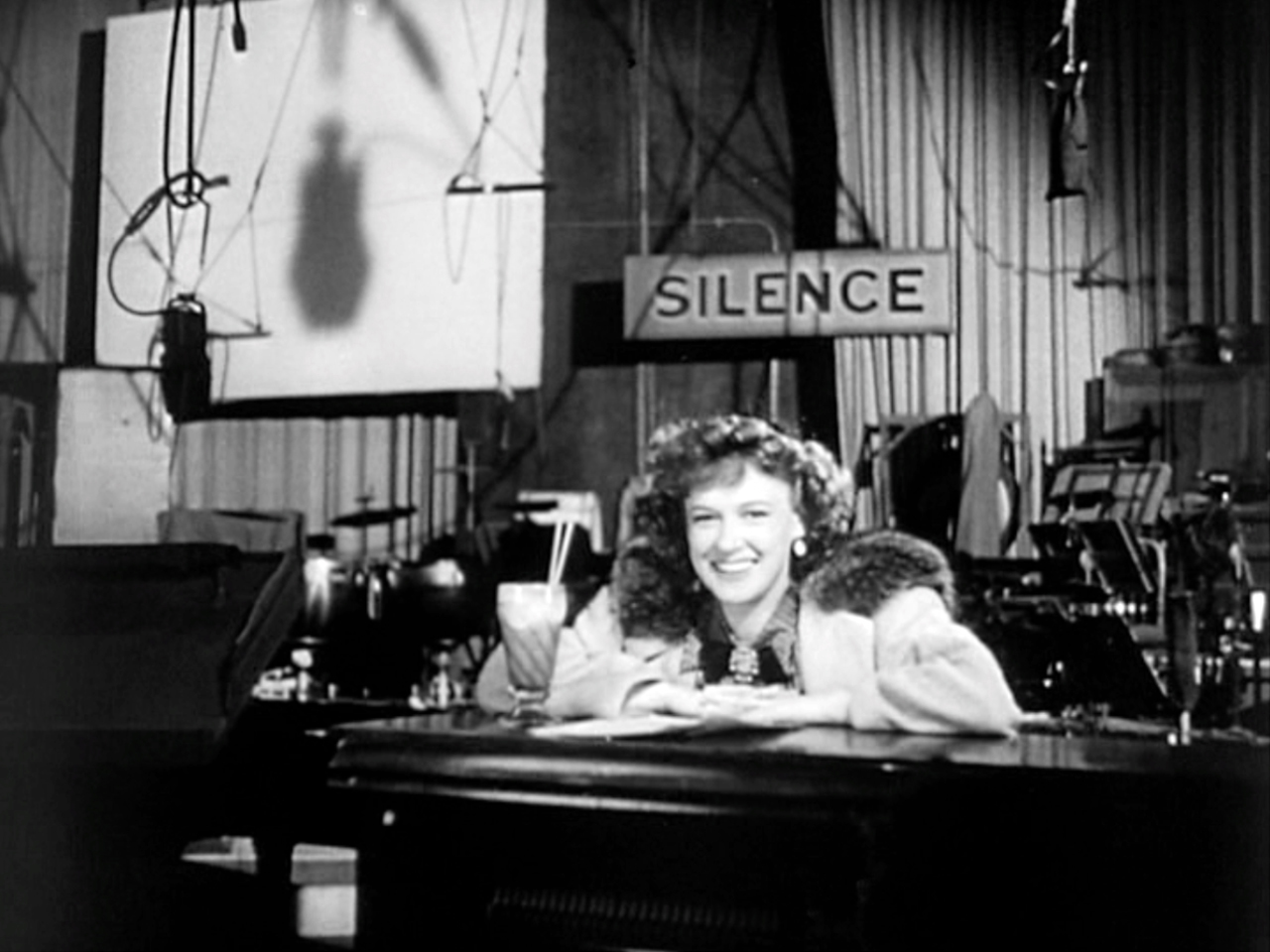
Dorothy Comingore

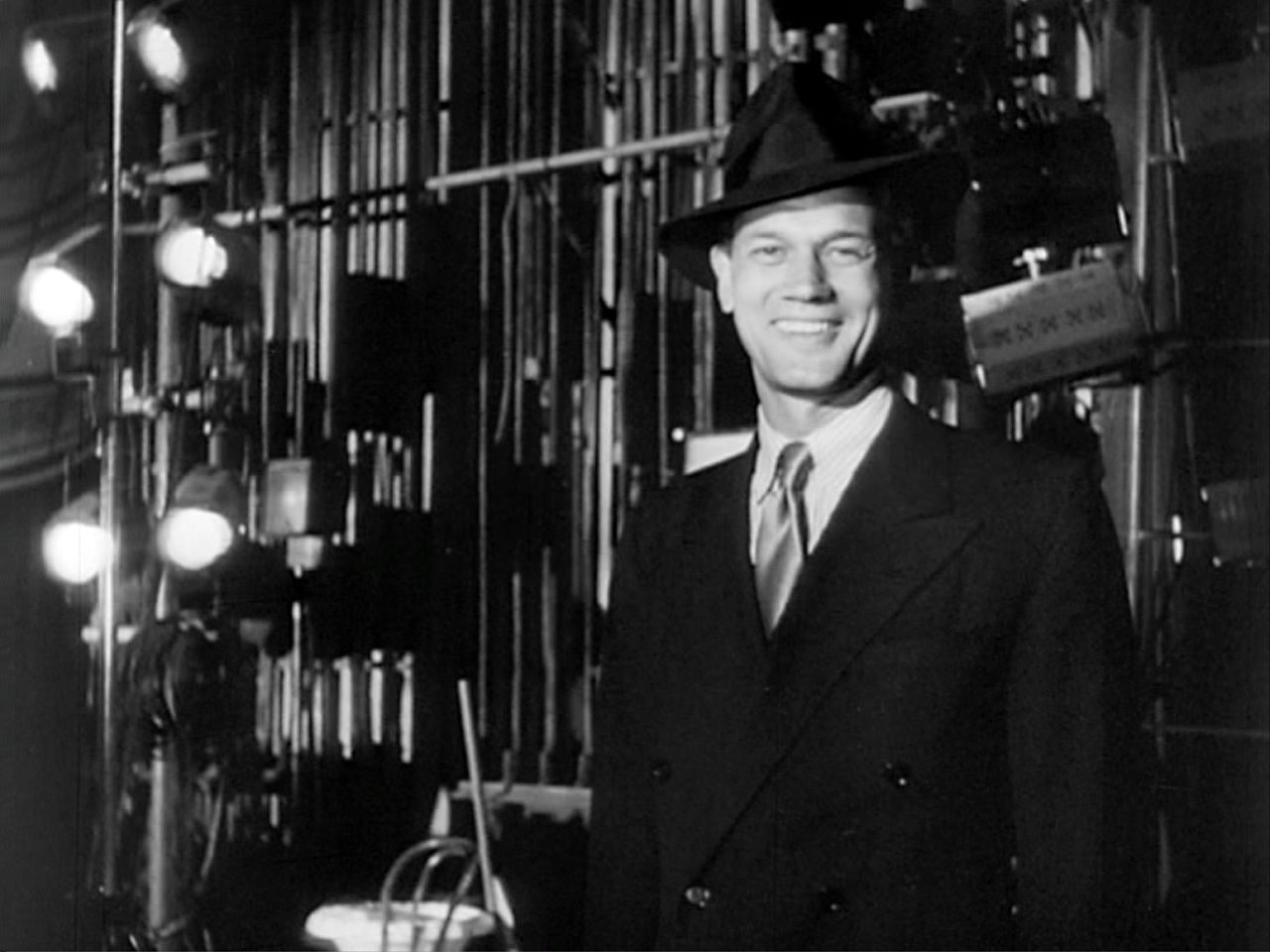
Joseph Cotten

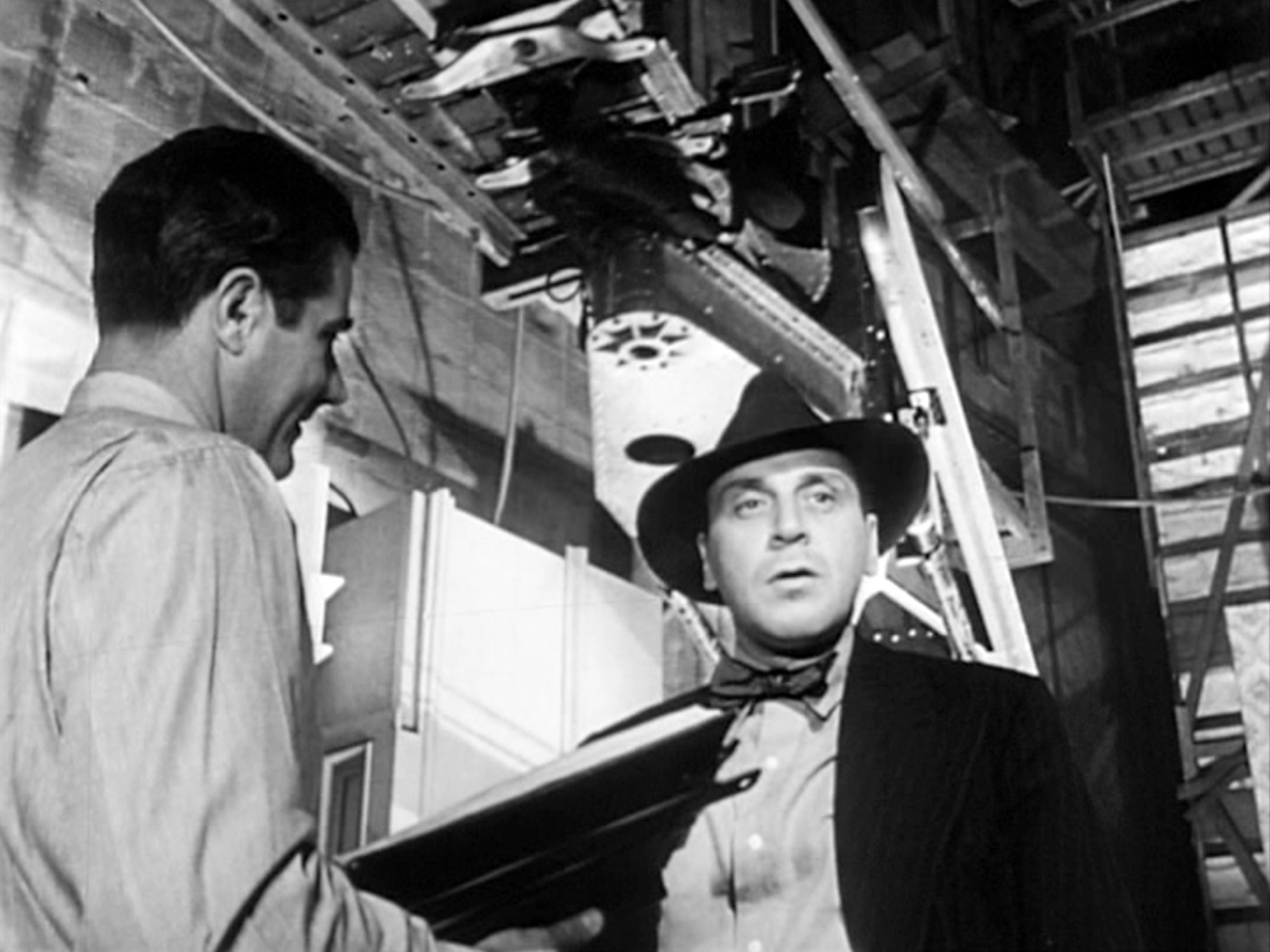
George Coulouris

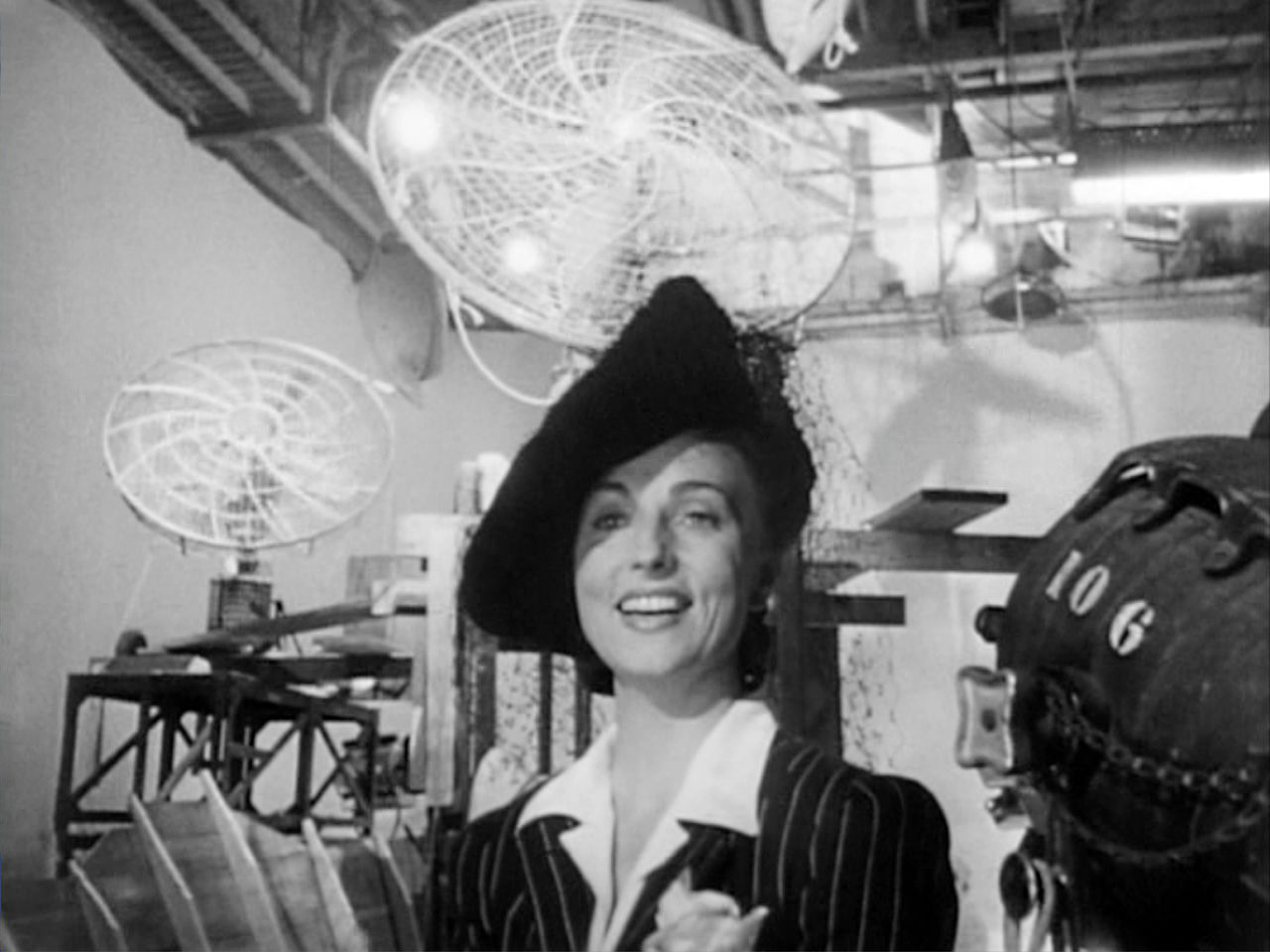
Agnes Moorehead

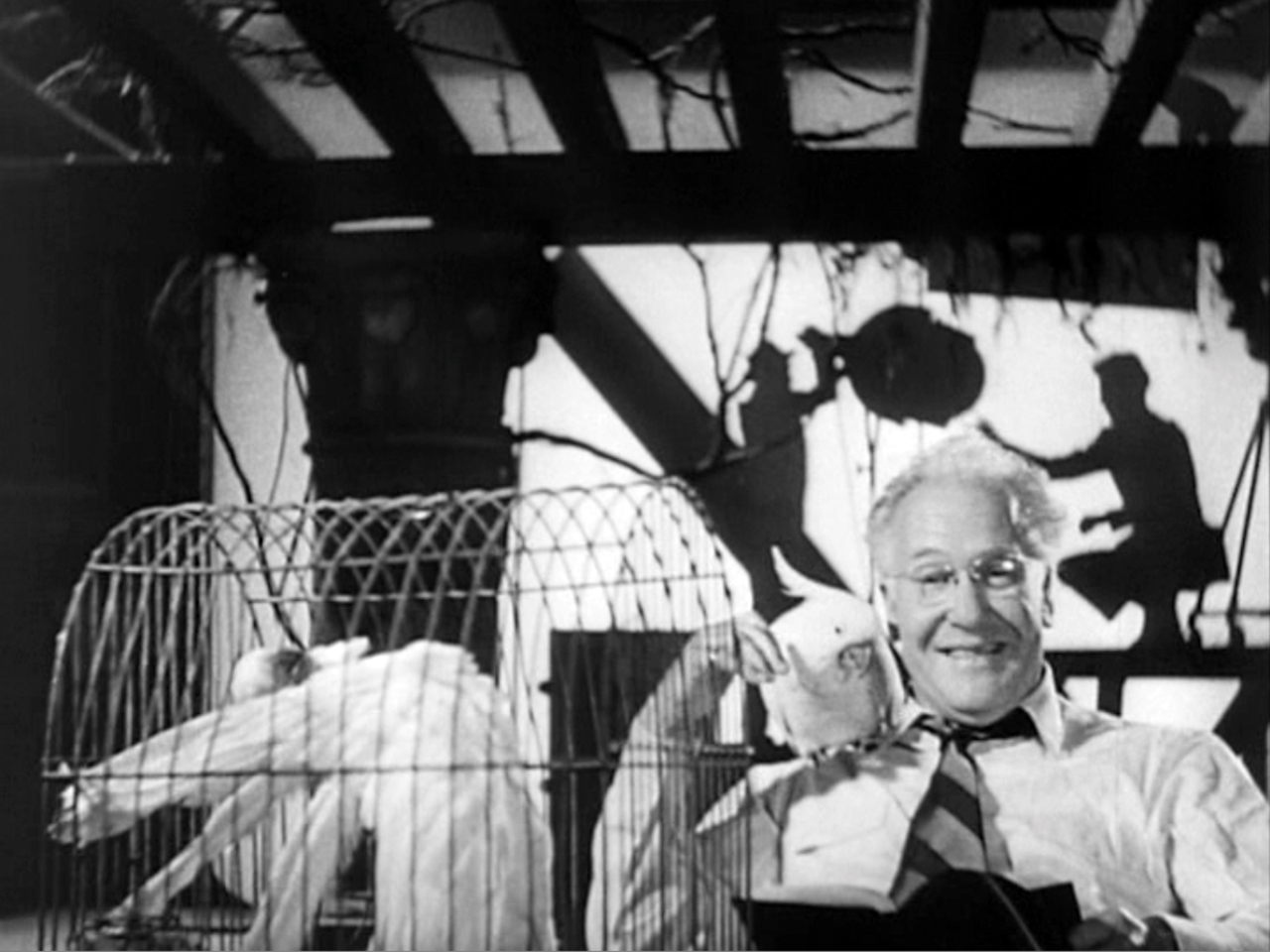
Erskine Sanford

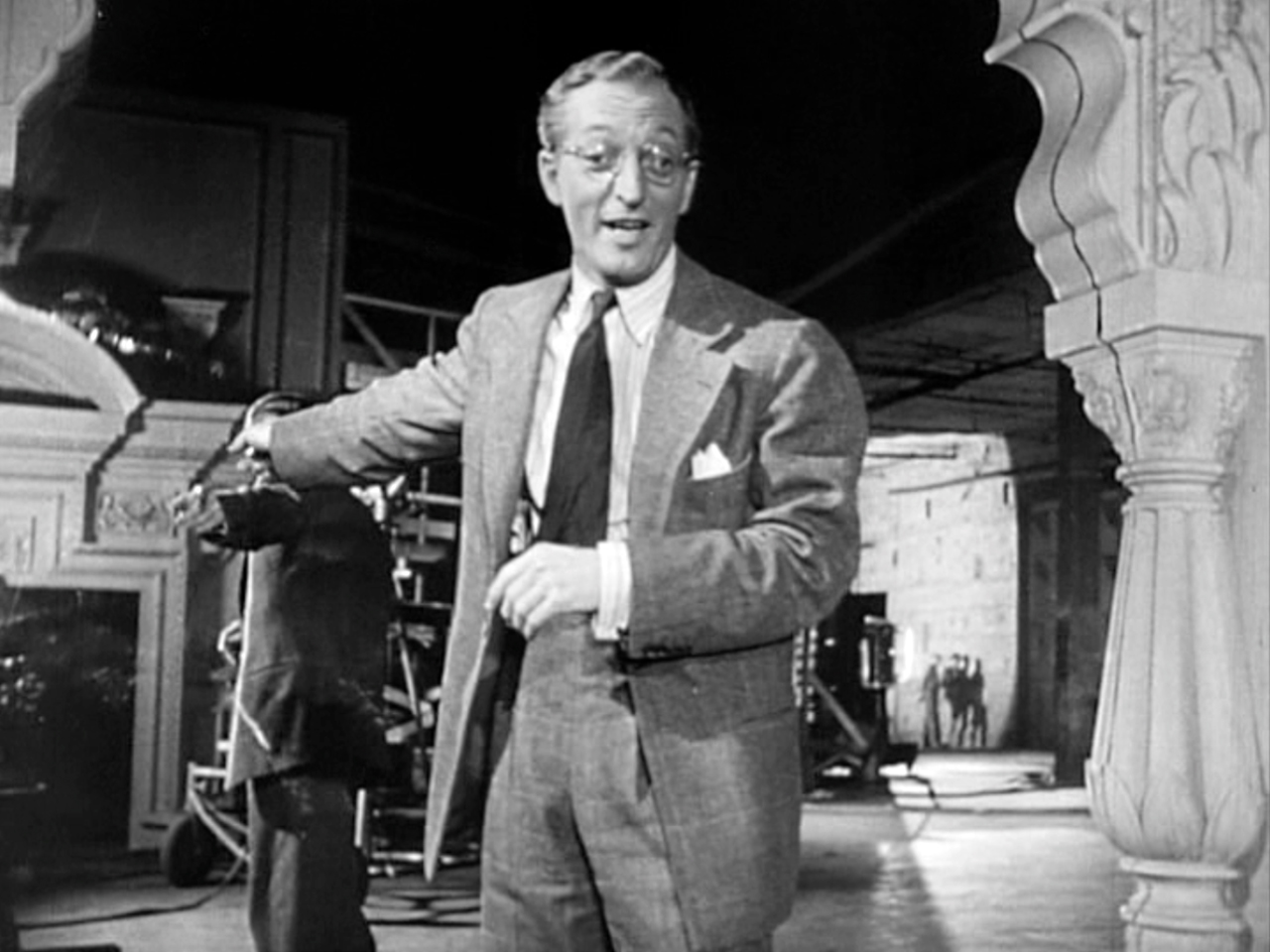
Everett Sloane

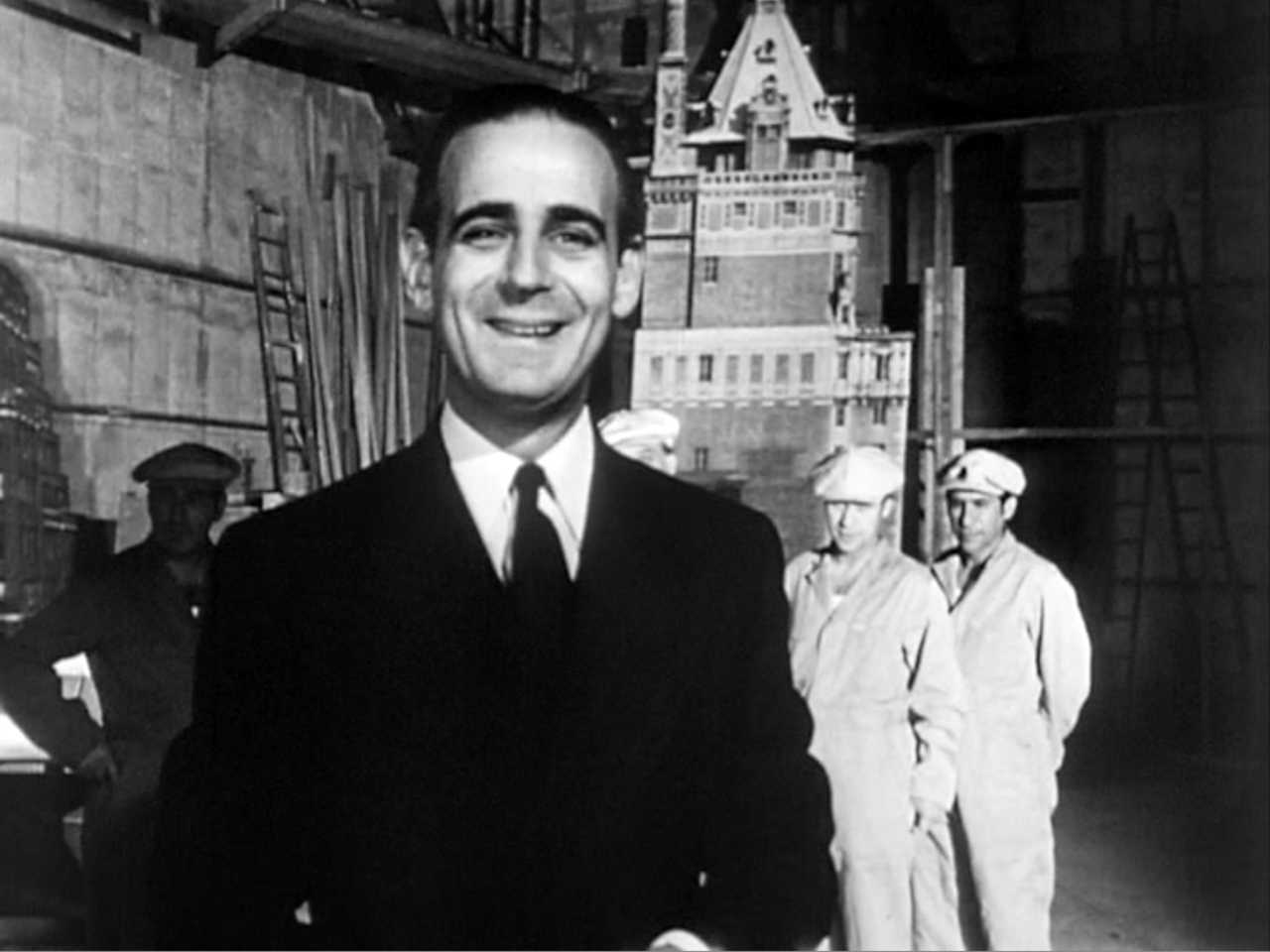
Paul Stewart

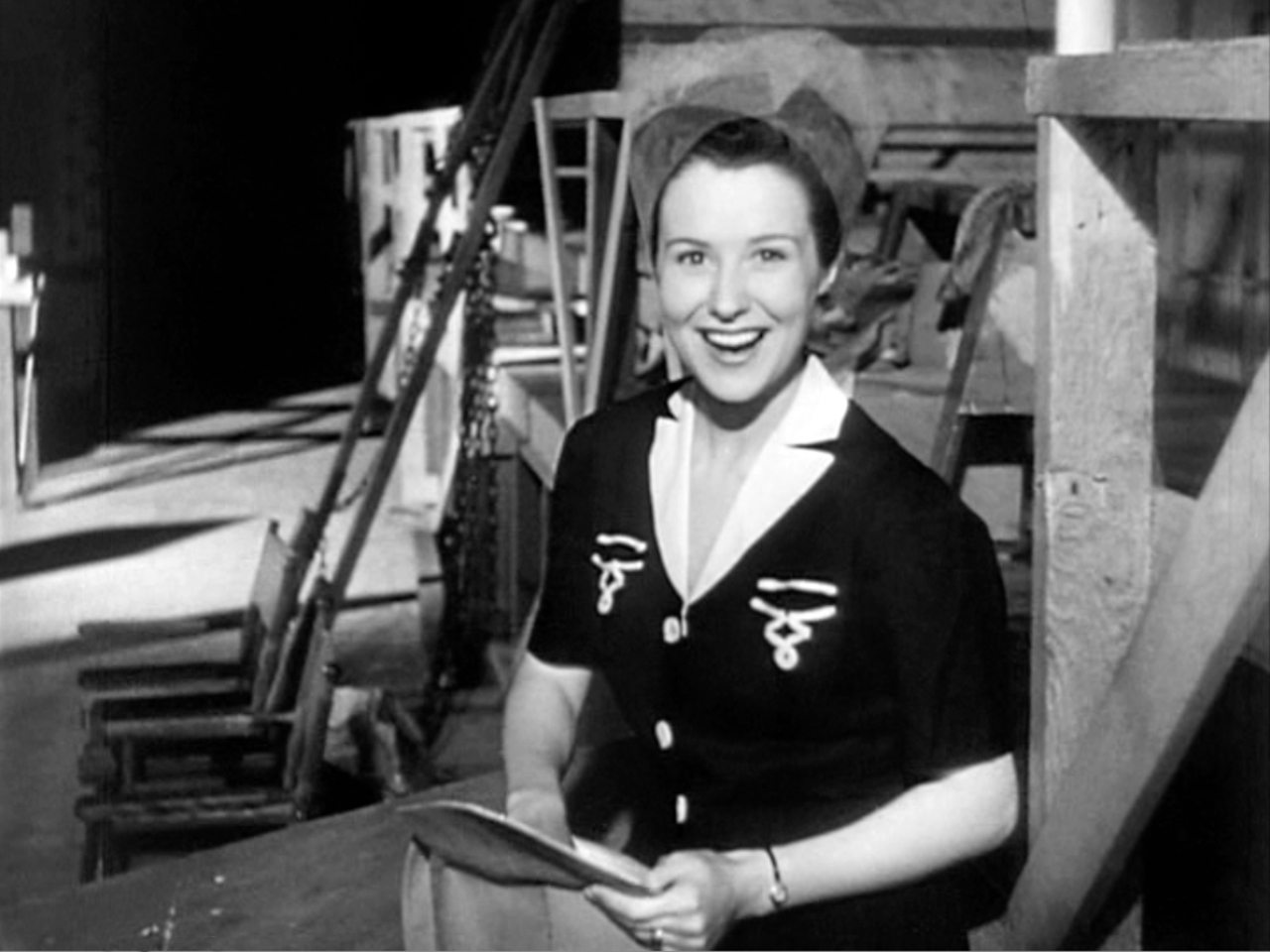
Ruth Warrick

== Content ==
How do you do, ladies and gentlemen? This is Orson Welles. I am speaking for the Mercury Theatre, and what follows is supposed to advertise our first motion picture.

— Orson Welles's narration in the Citizen Kane trailer

The film takes the form of a tour around the film set, while the precise nature of the film is kept under wraps, in keeping with the secrecy built up around the Mercury Theatre's debut feature. This was partly born out of necessity, to prevent William Randolph Hearst from knowing in advance that the film was a parallel of his life.

The film's producer, director, co-writer and star Orson Welles—then an established radio star—does not appear in person, but serves as the unseen narrator, introducing members of the cast.

There are several specially filmed excerpts of the film in rehearsal, with each member of the principal cast out of costume, reciting a signature line of their character, and stressing that the film's title character prompts extreme reactions from different people. The trailer also contains a number of trick shots, including one of Everett Sloane appearing at first to be running into the camera. Sloane actually runs into the reflection of the camera in a mirror.

The music heard throughout the trailer is the publisher's theme, "Oh, Mr. Kane". Welles heard the tune, "A Poco No" by Pepe Guízar, in Mexico. The special lyrics were written by Herman Ruby. The music was arranged by Conrad Salinger and is heard during the end titles of Citizen Kane.

Kane is a hero, and a scoundrel; a no-account, and a swell guy; a great lover, a great American citizen, and a dirty dog. It depends on who's talking about him. What's the real truth about Charles Foster Kane?

— Orson Welles's closing narration in the Citizen Kane trailer

== Cast ==
- Ray Collins as himself/Jim Gettys
- Dorothy Comingore as herself/Susan Alexander
- Joseph Cotten as himself/Jedediah Leland
- George Coulouris as himself/Walter Parks Thatcher
- Agnes Moorehead as herself/Mary Kane
- Erskine Sanford as himself/Herbert Carter
- Everett Sloane as himself/Mr. Bernstein
- Paul Stewart as himself/Raymond, the Butler
- Ruth Warrick as herself/Emily Monroe Norton Kane
- Orson Welles as himself

== Production ==
The promotional short was filmed at the same time as Citizen Kane itself, and offers the only existing behind-the-scenes footage of the film. It had a slightly different crew, with the director of photography being Harry J. Wild rather than Citizen Kane's Gregg Toland. The trailer was filmed at Toland's suggestion.

"I wrote the outline of the trailer and shot stuff for it while we were still shooting the movie," Welles recalled. "Because you see something that you're doing, and you say, 'That would be good for the trailer, you know?' Even if it wouldn't work in the film."

As it is classified as a trailer, no copyright was ever registered on the work, and it is now in the public domain. Consequently, it can now be freely viewed on YouTube, and other video websites.

== Critical reception and legacy ==
Numerous film critics have treated the trailer as a cinematic work in its own right, arguing it represents a critical stage in the development of Welles's directorial style.

Jonathan Rosenbaum has argued that all of Welles's films can be divided into narrative stories and documentary essays. He points to this short as being the first example of the latter from Welles, and that it is particularly important in light of the director's later experiments with the mockumentary format, including It's All True (1942), Around the World with Orson Welles (1955), F for Fake (1973), The Other Side of the Wind (1970-6), Filming Othello (1978), and the later versions of Whatever Happened to Don Quixote? (1957–85).

At the time, it was almost unprecedented for a film trailer to not actually feature anything of the film itself; and while the film Citizen Kane is frequently cited as a ground-breaking, influential film, Simon Callow argues its trailer was no less original in its approach. Callow writes that it has "great playful charm ... it is a miniature documentary, almost an introduction to the cinema ... Teasing, charming, completely original, it is a sort of conjuring trick: without his face appearing once on the screen, Welles entirely dominates its five [sic] minutes' duration."

Similarly, Welles biographer Frank Brady has written "Since the film promised to be unlike any other ever made in Hollywood, Orson wanted the trailer also to be unlike any other. He spent weeks on scripting, shooting, and editing it, and emerged with a punchy and intriguing look at the behind-the-scenes life of the film. It ... stood out from all the other trailers coming out from Hollywood, clarifying that Citizen Kane was going to be something special."

In a 2006 essay on the trailer for Citizen Kane, film scholar Paul Salmon notes that the short film has not been included in filmographies by Welles's biographers and is not mentioned in Robert Carringer's exhaustive book, The Making of Citizen Kane. "But there is absolutely no doubt about the importance of the work within the context of Welles studies," Salmon writes, "especially with respect to its uncanny anticipation of so many of the key debates that have shaped critical discourse on Welles."

The spirit of generosity inherent in Welles's emphasis on introducing the Mercury Players operates within the parameters set by Welles's role as the maestro conducting the proceedings, or, to follow Callow, as the master magician who conjures up all the trailer's tricks. Already, before the debates around the authorship of Kane, the trailer constitutes a deeply ambiguous work in terms of Welles's attitude toward collaborative filmmaking. And while there is a suggestion of disdain for the "ballyhoo" of commercial filmmaking, the trailer absolutely revels in show biz and its deconstruction.

Near the end of his career, Welles made one more extended film trailer with wholly original material: a nine-minute F for Fake trailer (1976), made three years after the film itself, in anticipation of the European production's American debut.

== Availability ==
The Citizen Kane trailer was first made available to a home audience on the 1987 Voyager laserdisc edition of Citizen Kane. Subsequently, Gary Graver's 1993 documentary Working With Orson Welles contained the trailer, and numerous DVD editions of Citizen Kane have contained the trailer as an extra, including the 2011 Blu-ray release and the 2021 4K Ultra HD release by The Criterion Collection.
