= Pioneers of the Frontier =

1940 film by Sam Nelson

- Directed by: Sam Nelson
- Screenplay by: Fred Myton
- Produced by: Leon Barsha
- Starring: Wild Bill Elliott; Dorothy Comingore; Dick Curtis; Dub Taylor; Stanley Brown; Richard Fiske
- Cinematography: George Meehan
- Edited by: James Sweeney
- Production company: Columbia Pictures
- Distributed by: Columbia Pictures
- Release date: February 14, 1940
- Running time: 58 minutes
- Country: United States
- Language: English

Pioneers of the Frontier is a 1940 American Western film directed by Sam Nelson and written by Fred Myton. The film stars Wild Bill Elliott, Dorothy Comingore, Dick Curtis, Dub Taylor, Stanley Brown and Richard Fiske. The film was released on February 14, 1940, by Columbia Pictures. It is the second in Columbia Pictures' series of four "Wild Bill Saunders" films, followed by The Man from Tumbleweeds.

== Cast ==
- Wild Bill Elliott as Wild Bill Saunders
- Dorothy Comingore as Joan Darcey
- Dick Curtis as Matt Brawley
- Dub Taylor as Cannonball Sims
- Stanley Brown as Dave
- Richard Fiske as Bart
- Carl Stockdale as Jim Darcey
- Lafe McKee as Mort Saunders
- Ralph McCullough as Lem Watkins
- Alan Bridge as Marshal Larsen
