= Transatlantic (1931 film) =

1931 film

- Film poster
- Directed by: William K. Howard
- Written by: Guy Bolton; Lynn Starling
- Starring: Edmund Lowe
- Cinematography: James Wong Howe
- Edited by: Jack Murray
- Distributed by: Fox Film Corporation
- Release date: August 30, 1931
- Running time: 78 minutes
- Country: United States
- Language: English

Transatlantic is a 1931 American pre-Code dramatic film directed by William K. Howard and starring Edmund Lowe. It won an Academy Award for Best Art Direction by Gordon Wiles.

== Cast ==
- Edmund Lowe as Monty Greer
- Lois Moran as Judy Kramer
- John Halliday as Henry D. Graham
- Greta Nissen as Sigrid Carline
- Myrna Loy as Kay Graham
- Jean Hersholt as Rudolph aka Jed Kramer
- Earle Foxe as Handsome
- Billy Bevan as Hodgkins
- Claude King as Captain
