= Prison Train =

1938 American crime drama film directed by Gordon Wiles

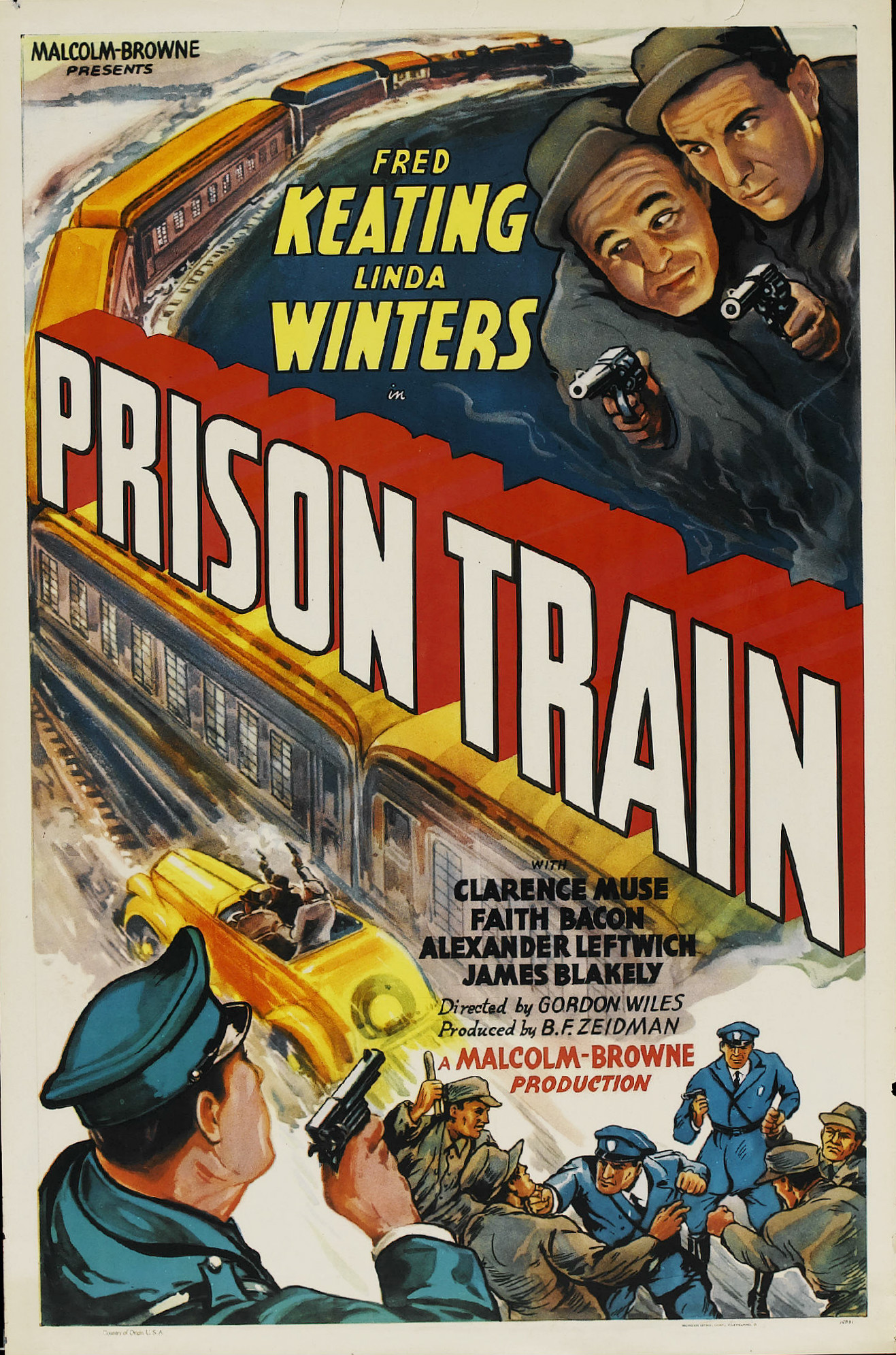
- Theatrical release poster
- Directed by: Gordon Wiles
- Written by: Mathew Borden (adaptation); Spencer Towne (adaptation)
- Screenplay by: Shepard Traube (1907–1983)
- Story by: Leonardo Bercovici
- Produced by: B. F. Zeidman
- Starring: Fred Keating; Dorothy Comingore
- Cinematography: Marcel Le Picard
- Edited by: Edward Schroeder
- Distributed by: Equity Pictures Corporation
- Release date: October 17, 1938 (United States)
- Running time: 64 mins.
- Country: United States
- Language: English

Prison Train is a 1938 American crime drama film directed by Gordon Wiles. Released by Equity Pictures Corporation, the film stars Fred Keating and Dorothy Comingore (billed as Linda Winters). Burlesque dancer Faith Bacon also appears in her only film role.

== Cast ==
- Fred Keating as Frankie Terris
- Dorothy Comingore as Louise Terris
- Clarence Muse as Train Steward/Sam
- Faith Bacon as Maxine
- Alexander Leftwich as Manny Robbins
- James Blakeley as Joe Robbins
- Sam Bernard as George
- John Pearson as Red
- Nestor Paiva as Morose
- Val Stanton as Sullen
- Peter Potter as Bill Adams
- Kit Guard as Guard
- Franklyn Farnum as The Lawyer
- George Lloyd as Bull
