= The Hairy Ape (film) =

1944 film by Alfred Santell

- Theatrical release poster
- Directed by: Alfred Santell
- Screenplay by: Robert Hardy Andrews; Decla Dunning
- Based on: The Hairy Ape by Eugene O'Neill
- Produced by: Jules Levey
- Starring: William Bendix; Susan Hayward; John Loder; Dorothy Comingore; Roman Bohnen; Tom Fadden; Alan Napier
- Cinematography: Lucien N. Andriot
- Edited by: Harvey Manger
- Music by: Michel Michelet
- Production company: Mayfair Productions Inc.
- Distributed by: United Artists
- Release date: July 2, 1944
- Running time: 92 minutes
- Country: United States
- Language: English

The Hairy Ape is a 1944 American drama film based upon the 1922 play of the same name by Eugene O'Neill. It was directed by Alfred Santell and adapted by Robert Hardy Andrews and Decla Dunning. The film stars William Bendix, Susan Hayward, John Loder, Dorothy Comingore, Roman Bohnen, Tom Fadden and Alan Napier. The film was released on July 2, 1944, by United Artists.

== Plot ==
Ship stoker Hank Smith (William Bendix) is a mountain of a man, but he is still very sensitive. So when the beautiful spoiled socialite Mildred Douglas (Susan Hayward) insults him with the slur "hairy ape," her words cut deep. At first the beastly Smith wants revenge for the insult, but after he thinks about it, he's more confused than anything else. After his ship docks, he departs into the city to track down the rich woman and find out the meaning behind her harsh words.

== Cast ==
- William Bendix as Hank Smith
- Susan Hayward as Mildred Douglas
- John Loder as Tony Lazar
- Dorothy Comingore as Helen Parker
- Roman Bohnen as Paddy
- Tom Fadden as Long
- Alan Napier as MacDougald
- Charles Cane as Gantry
- Charles La Torre as Portuguese Proprietor
- Paul Weigel as Doctor (uncredited)
