= Venus Makes Trouble =

1937 film by Gordon Wiles

- Directed by: Gordon Wiles
- Written by: Michael L. Simmons
- Starring: James Dunn; Patricia Ellis; Astrid Allwyn
- Cinematography: Lucien Ballard
- Edited by: James Sweeney
- Production company: Columbia Pictures
- Distributed by: Columbia Pictures
- Release date: May 14, 1937
- Running time: 58 minutes
- Country: United States
- Language: English

Venus Makes Trouble is a 1937 American comedy film directed by Gordon Wiles and starring James Dunn, Patricia Ellis and Astrid Allwyn. It was produced and distributed by Columbia Pictures as a second feature.

== Plot ==
Fast-talking publicity man Buzz Martin is involved in multiple schemes, including dropping fake money from an airplane, to betting on turtle races, to selling swampland for real estate, which eventually lands him in front of a grand jury.

== Cast ==
- James Dunn as Buzz Martin
- Patricia Ellis as Kay Horner
- Gene Morgan as Happy Hinkle
- Astrid Allwyn as Iris Randall
- Thurston Hall as Harlan Darrow
- Beatrice Curtis as Ruth Milner
- Donald Kirke as Lon Stanton
- Tom Chatterton as Kenneth Rowland
- Howard C. Hickman as Howard Clark
- Spencer Charters as Joel Willard
- Charles Lane as District Attorney
- Murdock MacQuarrie (uncredited)
