= Gordon Wiles =

American art director

- Born: October 10, 1904; St. Louis, Missouri
- Died: October 17, 1950 (aged 46)
- Occupations: Art director Film director
- Years active: 1931-1950

Gordon Wiles (October 10, 1904 – October 17, 1950) was an American art director and film director. He won an Oscar for Best Art Direction for the film Transatlantic. He was born in St. Louis, Missouri. His father, Albert Wiles, was a doctor in Jerseyville, Illinois.

== Selected filmography ==
- Transatlantic (art director; 1931)
- Almost Married (art director; 1932)
- Lady from Nowhere (director; 1936)
- Charlie Chan's Secret (director; 1936)
- Venus Makes Trouble (director; 1937)
- Prison Train (director; 1938)
- Mr. Boggs Steps Out (director; 1938)
- Forced Landing (director; 1941)
- The Gangster (director; 1947)
