= Wunder's Cemetery =

Cemetery in Chicago, Illinois, U.S.

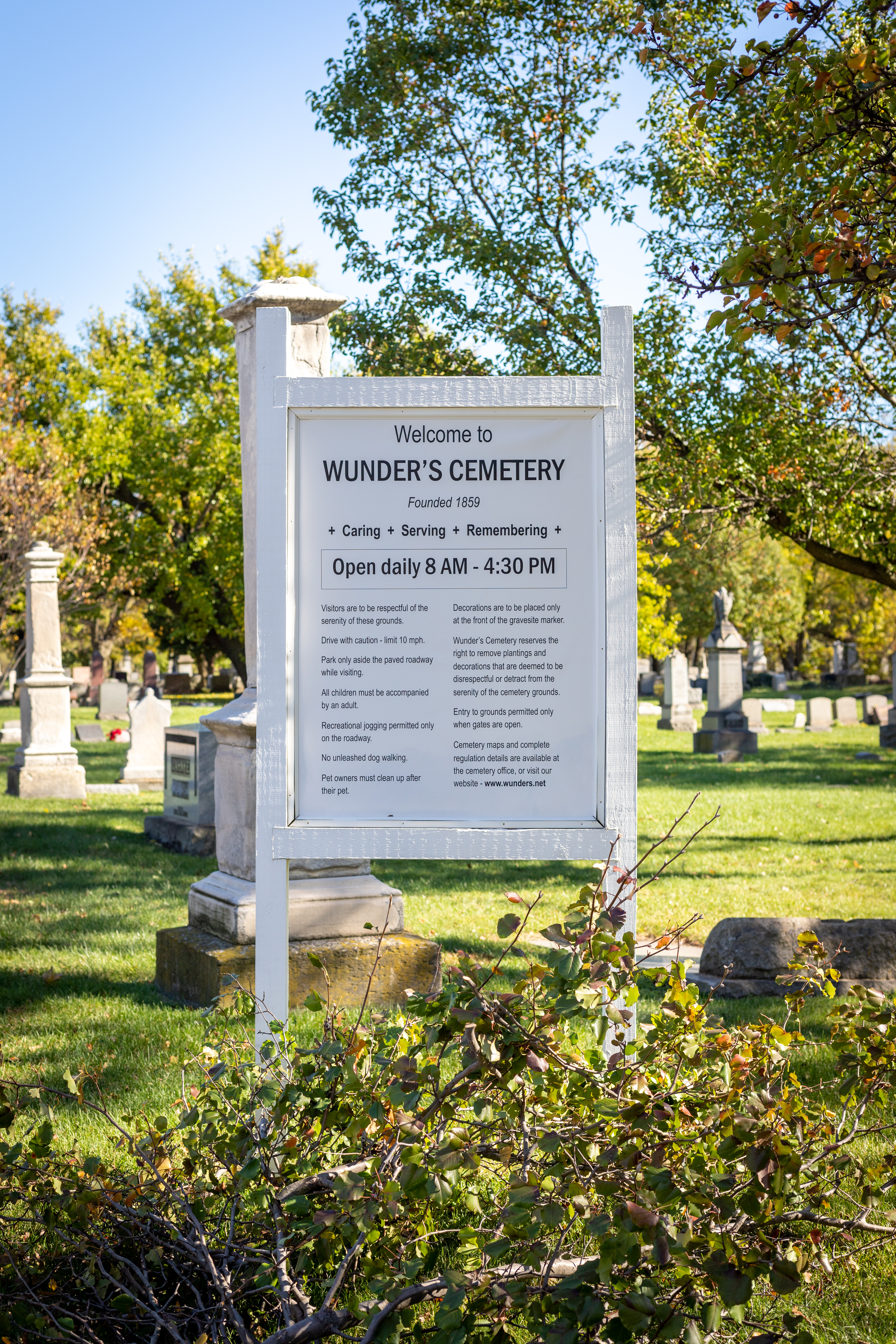
- Sign at the cemetery, 2020
- Interactive map of Wunder's Cemetery

Details
- Established: 1859
- Location: Chicago, Illinois
- Country: United States
- Coordinates: 41°57′14″N 87°39′35″W

Wunder's Cemetery (sometimes Wunder Cemetery; also known as German Lutheran Cemetery) is a 14.5-acre (5.9 ha) German Protestant cemetery in Chicago, in the U.S. state of Illinois. It was established in 1859. It is adjacent to Graceland Cemetery in Lakeview.
