= List of Canadian films of the 1930s =

This is a list of Canadian films that were released in the 1930s.

Title	Director	Cast	Genre	Notes
1931
Among the Igloo Dewellers	Richard Fennie		Documentary	
The Viking	George Melford	Charles Starrett, Louise Huntington, Arthur Vinton, Arthur Vinton	Drama	Technically not a Canadian film, The Viking is a forgotten Hollywood potboiler that nevertheless contains remarkable early footage of the life and hardships of Newfoundland seal hunters.
1933
The Crimson Paradise (US title Fighting Playboy)	Robert F. Hill	Nick Stuart, Lucile Browne	Drama shot in Vancouver	The first Canadian sound feature film; made with U.S. financing.
Damaged Lives	Edgar G. Ulmer	Diane Sinclair, Lyman Williams	Drama	Made with U.S. financing
1935
Lest We Forget	Frank Badgley, W.W. Murray		Short	Made by the Canadian Government Motion Picture Bureau, the precursor to the National Film Board of Canada.
Rhapsody in Two Languages	Gordon Sparling		Short	
Secrets of Chinatown	Fred C. Newmeyer	Nick Stuart, Lucile Brown	Drama	Made with U.S. financing
1936
From Nine to Nine	Edgar G. Ulmer	Ruth Roland, Roland Drew	Drama	Made with U.S. financing
House in Order	Gordon Sparling	John Pratt, Mildred Mitchell	Short drama	The film was sponsored by Shell Oil to promote its product.
The King's Plate (released in the US as Thoroughbred)	Sam Newfield	Toby Wing, Kenne Duncan	Drama	Made with U.S. financing
Lucky Corrigan (a/k/a Fury and the Woman)	Lewis D. Collins	William Gargan	Melodrama	Made with U.S. financing
Lucky Fugitives	Nick Grinde	David Manners	Drama	Made with U.S. financing
Secret Patrol	David Selman	Charles Starrett	Drama	Made with U.S. financing
Tugboat Princess	David Selman	Walter C. Kelly, Valerie Hobson	Drama	Made with U.S. financing
Undercover	Sam Newfield	Charles Starrett, Adrienne Doré, Kenneth Duncan, Wheeler Oakman	Drama	Made with U.S. financing
1937
En pays neuf	Maurice Proulx		Documentary	
The Kinsmen	Gordon Sparling		Short	From the Canadian Cameo series produced by Associated Screen News of Canada from Montreal.
Murder Is News	Leon Barsha	John Gallaude. Iris Meredith	Drama	Made with U.S. financing
Patrol to the Northwest Passage	Richard Fennie		Documentary	
Stampede	Ford Beebe	Charles Starrett	Western	Made with U.S. financing
What Price Vengeance	Del Lord	Lyle Talbot, Wendy Barrie. Wally Albright	Drama	Made with U.S. financing
Woman against the World	David Selman	Alice Moore, Ralph Forbes	Melodrama	Made with U.S. financing
1938
Convicted	Leon Barsha	Charles Quigley, Rita Hayworth	Drama	Made with U.S. financing
Death Goes North	Frank McDonald	Edgar Edwards, Sheila Bromley	Drama	Made with U.S. financing
Across the Border (also known as Special Inspector)	Leon Barsha	Charles Quigley, Rita Hayworth	Drama	Made with U.S. financing
1939
The Case of Charlie Gordon	Stuart Legg		Short	
