= Don Douglas (actor) =

Scottish actor (1905–1945)

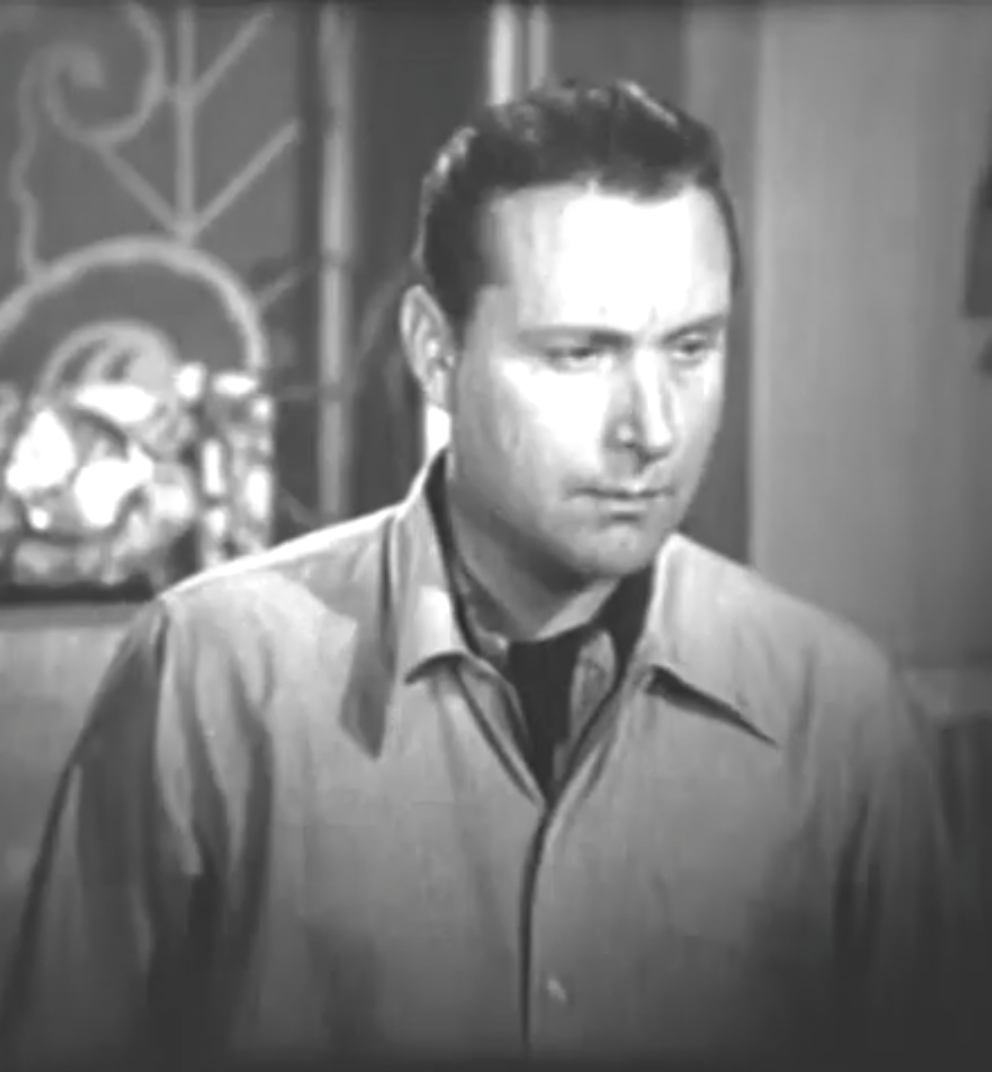
- Douglas in The Zero Hour (1939)
- Born: Douglas William Kinleyside; 24 August 1905; Edinburgh, Scotland
- Died: 31 December 1945 (aged 40); Los Angeles, California, U.S.
- Resting place: Forest Lawn Memorial Park, Glendale, California
- Occupation: Actor
- Years active: 1928–1945
- Spouse(s): Charlotte Merriam; m. 1936)
- Children: 2

Donald Douglas (born Douglas William Kinleyside, 24 August 1905 – 31 December 1945) was a Scottish-American actor who performed in films, on the stage and in radio.

== Early life ==
Douglas was born in Edinburgh, Scotland, 24 August 1905, and was christened at a church in Twickenham, England. He was the son of William Young Kinleyside, a businessman and lawyer. Business brought his father to New York City on several occasions, and eventually, five-year old Douglas, with his sister Hazel, was brought to America as second cabin class passengers, on board the British steamer Mauritania, which sailed from the Port of Liverpool on 29 October 1910, and arrived at the Port of New York, 4 November. He became an American citizen in 1939.

== Career ==
Douglas was given his stage name by Florenz Ziegfeld Jr. in 1927.

=== Stage ===
Adopting the stage name "Don Douglas", he became a singer and actor in musical shows such as Footlites. In 1928, his big break came when he won glowing revues for his performance in The Desert Song in the Orpheum Theatre in Chicago. This would eventually lead to his career in talking pictures.

=== Film ===
Douglas appeared in over 100 films from the late 1920s to the 1940s including The Great Gabbo (1929), Life Begins (1932), Men in White (1934), Madame X (1937), Cheers for Miss Bishop (1941), Now, Voyager (1942), Little Tokyo, U.S.A. (1942), Tall in the Saddle (1944), Murder, My Sweet (1944) and Show Business (1944). One of his more prominent roles was also one of his last: In Gilda (1946), he plays the man who pretends to marry Rita Hayworth but is really a henchman of Glenn Ford's character.

=== Radio ===
Douglas was a one-man cast on The Black Castle. He played all roles in each episode and was the announcer. A review of The Black Castle in the trade publication Billboard complimented Douglas's handling of multiple roles in the drama. Bob Francis wrote: "Except for the fact that he is inclined to ham the wizard, making the role often seem more silly than awesome, Douglas puts on a good 15 minutes. His vocal changes are sharp and clear, and his characterizations come over effectively."

He also had the title role in John Steele, Adventurer and played Chief Jake Workley in Scattergood Baines. He was also a member of the cast of Kelly's Courthouse.

== Death ==
Douglas died on 31 December 1945 in Los Angeles, California, aged 40, after emergency surgery for a ruptured appendix. He is interred in the Forest Lawn Memorial Park Cemetery in Glendale, California.

== Partial filmography ==
- The Great Gabbo (1929) - Frank
- Tonight at Twelve (1929) - Tom Stoddard
- Life Begins (1932) - Medical Student in a Business Suit (uncredited)
- He Couldn't Take It (1933) - Oakley
- You Can't Buy Everything (1934) - Intern at Clinic (uncredited)
- A Woman's Man (1934) - Walter Payson - Horseback Rider
- Lazy River (1934) - Officer (uncredited)
- Men in White (1934) - Mac
- Operator 13 (1934) - Confederate Officer (uncredited)
- Tomorrow's Children (1934) - Dr. Brooks
- Transatlantic Merry-Go-Round (1934) - Purser (uncredited)
- Sequoia (1934) - (uncredited)
- Night Life of the Gods (1935) - Mr. Martin (uncredited)
- Bad Guy (1937) - Electrical Instructor (uncredited)
- The Women Men Marry (1937) - Auctioneer Mc Vey (uncredited)
- Madame X (1937) - Mr. Edison - Yacht Officer (uncredited)
- Navy Blue and Gold (1937) - Lt. North (uncredited)
- Headin' East (1937) - Eric Ward
- Manhattan Shakedown (1937) - Hadley Brown
- Special Inspector (1938) - Williams
- Judge Hardy's Children (1938) - J.J. Harper (uncredited)
- Test Pilot (1938) - Pilot in Cafe (uncredited)
- Alexander's Ragtime Band (1938) - Singer (scenes deleted)
- Fast Company (1938) - Lt. James Flanner
- The Crowd Roars (1938) - Murray
- Smashing the Rackets (1938) - Harry Spaulding
- The Gladiator (1938) - Coach Robbins
- Convicted (1938) - District Attorney
- The Night Hawk (1938) - Tom Niles (uncredited)
- The Spider's Web (1938, Serial) - Jenkins (the Butler)
- Law of the Texan (1938) - Chet Hackett
- Orphans of the Street (1938) - Colonel Daniels
- Pacific Liner (1939) - Ship's Officer (uncredited)
- The Mysterious Miss X (1939) - Clarence Fredericks
- Jesse James (1939) - Infantry Captain (uncredited)
- Wings of the Navy (1939) - Officer of the Day
- Fast and Loose (1939) - Forbes
- Within the Law (1939) - Inspector Burke
- Sergeant Madden (1939) - Al Boylan Sr. (scenes deleted)
- The Man Who Dared (1939) - Mr. Miller (uncredited)
- Mr. Moto in Danger Island (1939) - Ship's Officer - Fight Referee (uncredited)
- The Zero Hour (1939) - Brewster
- Second Fiddle (1939) - Film Director (uncredited)
- Stronger Than Desire (1939) - Mack Clark - Flagg's Investigator (uncredited)
- The House of Fear (1939) - John Woodford
- Fugitive at Large (1939) - Stevens
- Sabotage (1939) - Joe Grayson
- Smashing the Money Ring (1939) - Gordon (uncredited)
- On Dress Parade (1939) - Col. Wm. Duncan
- Calling Philo Vance (1940) - Philip Wrede
- Charlie Chan in Panama (1940) - Captain Lewis
- Dr. Kildare's Strange Case (1940) - Mr. Grayson, Patient losing Eye Sight (uncredited)
- Edison, the Man (1940) - Jordan (uncredited)
- Island of Doomed Men (1940) - Department of Justice Official (uncredited)
- A Fugitive from Justice (1940) - Lee Leslie
- Queen of the Mob (1940) - Second FBI Director (uncredited)
- Deadwood Dick (1940, Serial) - Dick Stanley - aka Deadwood Dick
- I Love You Again (1940) - Herbert
- Gallant Sons (1940) - Hackberry
- Flight Command (1940) - 1st Duty Officer
- Cheers for Miss Bishop (1941) - Delbert Thompson
- Andy Hardy's Private Secretary (1941) - Mr. J.O. Harper (uncredited)
- Murder Among Friends (1941) - Joe Ellis
- Sleepers West (1941) - Tom Linscott
- Dead Men Tell (1941) - Jed Thomasson
- A Shot in the Dark (1941) - Roger Armstrong
- The Great Swindle (1941) - Bill Farrow
- The Get-Away (1941) - Jim Duff
- Sergeant York (1941) - Captain Tillman (uncredited)
- Whistling in the Dark (1941) - Gordon Thomas
- The Pittsburgh Kid (1941) - (uncredited)
- Hold Back the Dawn (1941) - Joe (uncredited)
- Mercy Island (1941) - Clay Foster
- The Night of January 16th (1941) - Attorney Polk
- Melody Lane (1941) - J. Roy Thomas
- The Bugle Sounds (1942) - Mr. Clyde - FBI Agent (uncredited)
- On the Sunny Side (1942) - Mr. George Andrews
- Juke Box Jenny (1942) - Roger Wadsworth
- Little Tokyo, U.S.A. (1942) - Hendricks
- Tales of Manhattan (1942) - 'Hen 'Henderson (Robinson sequence)
- Daring Young Man (1942) - Carl Rankin
- Now, Voyager (1942) - George Weston (uncredited)
- The Crystal Ball (1943) - Mr. Bowman (uncredited)
- The Meanest Man in the World (1943) - Husband (uncredited)
- He's My Guy (1943) - Kirk
- The More the Merrier (1943) - FBI Agent Harding
- Action in the North Atlantic (1943) - Lieutenant Commander (uncredited)
- Appointment in Berlin (1943) - Bill Banning (uncredited)
- Behind the Rising Sun (1943) - Clancy O'Hara
- Wintertime (1943) - Jay Rogers (uncredited)
- The Falcon Out West (1944) - Attorney Steven Hayden
- Show Business (1944) - Charlie Lucas
- Tall in the Saddle (1944) - Harolday
- Heavenly Days (1944) - Dr. George Gallup
- Murder, My Sweet (1944) - Police Lieutenant Randall
- Grissly's Millions (1945) - Ellison Hayes
- A Royal Scandal (1945) - Variatinsky (uncredited)
- Tarzan and the Amazons (1945) - Andres
- Mama Loves Papa (1945) - Secretary (uncredited)
- Club Havana (1945) - Johnny Norton
- The Strange Mr. Gregory (1945) - John Randall
- Tokyo Rose (1946) - Timothy O'Brien
- Gilda (1946) - Thomas Langford
- The Truth About Murder (1946) - Paul Marvin (final film role)
