= Girls Can Play =

1937 drama film directed by Lambert Hillyer

- Directed by: Lambert Hillyer
- Starring: Julie Bishop; Charles Quigley; Rita Hayworth
- Cinematography: Lucien Ballard
- Edited by: Byron Robinson
- Distributed by: Columbia Pictures
- Release date: June 23, 1937
- Running time: 59 minutes
- Country: United States
- Language: English

Girls Can Play is a 1937 American drama film directed by Lambert Hillyer. It stars Julie Bishop, Charles Quigley, and Rita Hayworth.

== Plot ==
Ann Casey, a softball player, responds to a newspaper advertisement looking for models at a photography studio because she is sick of wearing activewear and wants to wear something more elegant. While in line, a reporter named Jimmy Jones diverts her, costing Ann the job inadvertently.

When she returns to playing softball, Jimmy thinks there might be a story in the team. He finds its owner is a gangster, Foy Harris, and then stumbles into a diabolical murder plot involving Foy being disguised as a woman on the team. Foy first kills his partner, then, because she knows too much, murders player Sue Collins by poisoning the laces of her catcher's mitt.

Ann ends up hiding in Foy's closet, in danger of her life and is then used as a hostage before Jimmy arrives to save her, just in time.

== Cast ==
- Julie Bishop as Ann Casey (billed as Jacqueline Wells)
- Rita Hayworth as Sue Collins
- Charles Quigley as Jimmy Jones
- John Gallaudet as Foy Harris
- Patricia Farr as Peanuts O'Malley

== See also ==
- List of baseball films
- Women in baseball
