= The Heritage of the Desert =

The Heritage of the Desert may refer to:

- The Heritage of the Desert (novel) (1910), by Zane Grey
- The Heritage of the Desert (film) (1924), based on Grey's novel; directed by Irvin Willat
- Heritage of the Desert (1932 film), based on Grey's novel; directed by Henry Hathaway
- Heritage of the Desert (1939 film), based on Grey's novel; directed by Lesley Selander
