= 3rd Canadian Film Awards =

Canadian film awards ceremony

- Date: April 22, 1951
- Location: Odeon Theatre, Ottawa, Ontario
- Hosted by: Mary Pickford

The 3rd Canadian Film Awards were presented on April 22, 1951, to honour achievements in Canadian film. The ceremony was hosted by Mary Pickford.

This year, the selection process was changed; specialized judging panels assessed theatrical, non-theatrical and amateur entries, and judges were given more detailed instructions. Due to budget constraints, the physical prizes were printed certificates.

At the dinner before the awards presentation, Fred Dillon of the Canadian Motion Picture Distributors Association presented Dominion archivist Dr. William Kaye Lamb with a letter from Thomas Edison. In the letter, dated May 1, 1894, Edison thanked Ottawa businessmen George Holland and Andrew Holland for successfully using his Kinetoscope (the precursor of the projector) to exhibit a film. Pickford, a director of the Edison Pioneers, received a copy of the letter for presentation to the Edison Museum in New Jersey.

== Winners ==
- Film of the Year: Not awarded
- Theatrical Short: Après le bagne (After Prison, What?) — National Film Board of Canada, Gil LaRoche producer, Ron Weyman director
- Non-Theatrical, Open: Feelings of Depression — National Film Board of Canada, Tom Daly producer, Stanley Jackson director

Honourable Mention: The Oyster-Man — National Film Board of Canada, Michael Spencer producer, Julian Biggs and Jean Palardy directors

- Amateur: Not awarded

Honourable Mention: Parking on This Side — University of Toronto Film Society, Michel Sanouillet director
Honourable mention: Frontiersman — Crawley Films, Emmanuel J. Heuer producer

- Special Awards:

- Léo-Ernest Ouimet — "for outstanding contributions to film in Canada as a pioneer distributor, exhibitor, producer, and cameraman"
- Sitzmarks the Spot, Associated Screen Studios, Bernard Norrish producer, Gordon Sparling director — "for an outstanding job in handling a comedy theme, a field in which few Canadians have excelled".
- Family Tree, National Film Board of Canada, Tom Daly producer, George Dunning and Evelyn Lambart directors — "for its outstanding animation and music score".
- The Fight: Science Against Cancer, National Film Board of Canada, Guy Glover producer, Morten Parker director — "for a splendid representation of a significant social problem".
- Winter Angling in Comfort (Pêche à la cabane), Cine-Photography Branch, Province of Quebec, Maurice Montgrain producer, Louis Soucy director — "for its expert handling of a 'tourist' film and excellent photography under difficult conditions".

- Special Citations:

- Winston Barron and Canadian Paramount News, Child Development Series, Crawley Films producer
- Buffoons — Graphic Associates, Jim MacKay and George Dunning producers
- Look to the Forest — National Film Board of Canada, Donald Fraser director
- Trees Are a Crop — National Film Board of Canada, Evelyn Spice Cherry producer, Jack Bordelay director
- Power of Pennies — Crawley Films, F.R. Crawley producer and Quentin Brown producers, Quentin Brown director
- Canadian Cameos Series — Associated Screen Studios. Bernard Norrish producer, Gordon Sparling director
- A Friend at the Door — National Film Board of Canada, James Beveridge and Tom Daly producers, Leslie McFarlane director
- Les Anciens Canadiens (French Canada - 1534-1848) — National Film Board of Canada, Guy Glover producer, Bernard Devlin director
