= Joan Perry =

American actress (1911–1996)

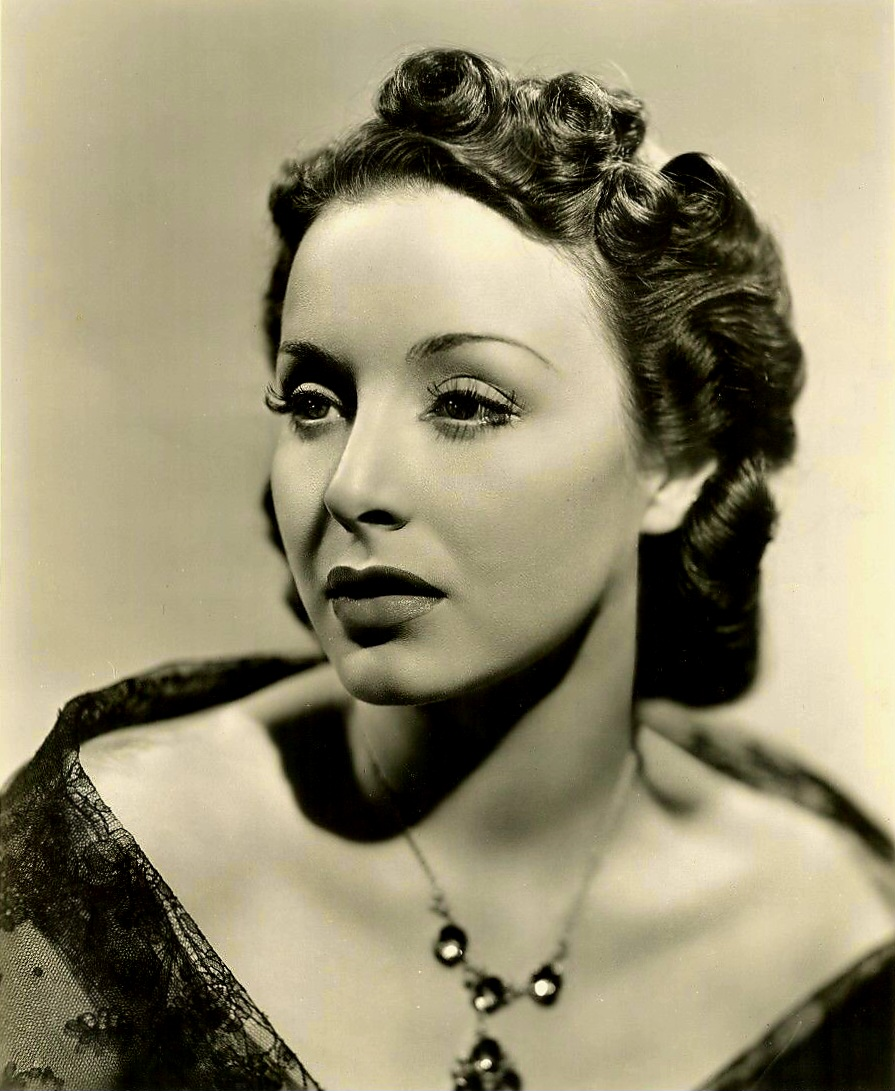
- Perry in 1938
- Born: Elizabeth Rosiland Miller; July 7, 1911; Pensacola, Florida, U.S.
- Died: September 16, 1996 (aged 85); Montecito, California, U.S.
- Resting place: Hollywood Forever Cemetery
- Other names: Betty Miller; Joan Cohn
- Occupation: Actress
- Years active: 1935–1941
- Spouses: Harry Cohn (m. 1941; died 1958) Harry Karl (m. 1959; div. 1960) Laurence Harvey (m. 1968; div. 1972)
- Children: 3

Joan Perry (born Elizabeth Rosiland Miller; July 7, 1911 – September 16, 1996) was an American film actress.

== Early years ==
Perry attended Plant High School in Tampa, Florida.

== Career ==
Perry gained early acting experience by participating in class plays in Tampa, Florida. In the early 1930s, Perry worked as a model in New York City. In 1935, she went to Hollywood and was signed under contract to Columbia Pictures, and during her time there, she co-starred with actors such as Ronald Reagan, Ralph Bellamy, Lew Ayres, and Melvyn Douglas.

Following her leave from Columbia in the early 1940s, she went to Warner Bros.; her movies included International Squadron (1941) and Nine Lives Are Not Enough (1941).

== Personal life ==
Perry was married three times. On September 30, 1941, she wed Columbia Pictures mogul Harry Cohn in New York City. They remained married until his death in 1958. She later married Harry Karl and, after divorcing him, married actor Laurence Harvey. They also divorced. She had a home in Palm Springs, California.

After the death of Harry Cohn, Perry and actor Tab Hunter became close friends, and the media began speculating about their relationship, especially as Joan's marriage to Harvey faced challenges. After divorcing Harvey, Joan proposed to Hunter, but despite their deep connection, he turned her down, preferring to maintain their friendship without any romantic involvement.

Perry died from emphysema in September 1996 at age 85 in Montecito, California. She is buried at Hollywood Forever Cemetery in Hollywood, California.

== Filmography ==
- Heir to Trouble (1935)
- Case of the Missing Man (1935)
- Gallant Defender (1935)
- Dangerous Intrigue (1936)
- The Mysterious Avenger (1936)
- Shakedown (1936)
- Meet Nero Wolfe (1936)
- Blackmailer (1936)
- Counterfeit Lady (1936)
- The Devil Is Driving (1937)
- Start Cheering (1938)
- Blind Alley (1939)
- Good Girls Go to Paris (1939)
- The Lone Wolf Strikes (1940)
- Maisie Was a Lady (1940)
- Strange Alibi (1940)
- Bullets for O'Hara (1940)
- International Squadron (1941)
- Nine Lives Are Not Enough (1941)
