= Evelyn Venable =

American actress (1913–1993)

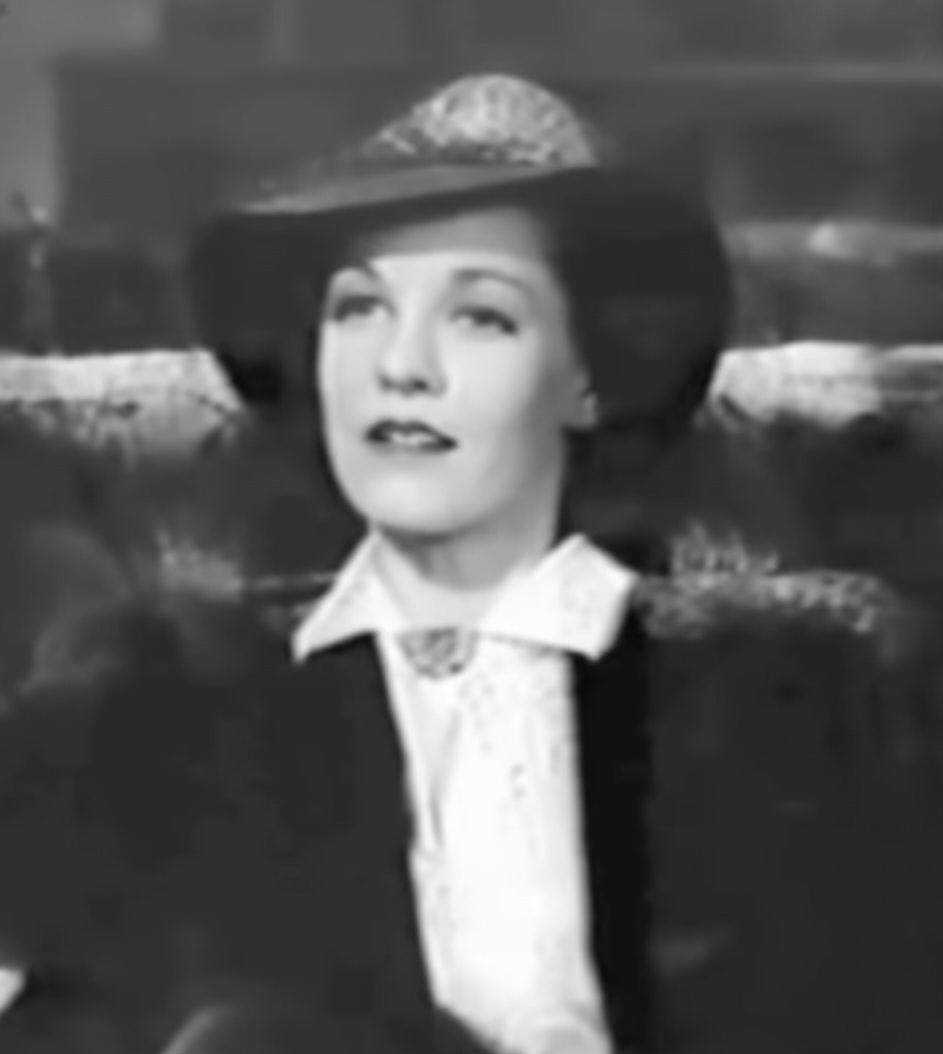
- Venable in Female Fugitive (1938)
- Born: October 18, 1913; Cincinnati, Ohio, U.S.
- Died: November 15, 1993 (aged 80); Coeur d'Alene, Idaho, U.S.
- Education: University of California, Los Angeles
- Occupation: Actress
- Years active: 1933–1947
- Notable work: Original voice of The Blue Fairy in Disney's Pinocchio (1940)
- Spouse: Hal Mohr (m. 1934; died 1974)
- Children: 2

Evelyn Venable (October 18, 1913 – November 15, 1993) was an American actress perhaps best known for her role as Grazia in the 1934 film Death Takes a Holiday. In addition to acting in around two dozen films during the 1930s and 1940s, she was also the voice and model for the Blue Fairy in Walt Disney's Pinocchio (1940). She is one of a number of women who have been suggested to have served as the model for the personification of Columbia in the Columbia Pictures logo that was used from 1928 to 1936.

For her work in films, Venable has a star on the Hollywood Walk of Fame at 1500 Vine Street.

== Life and career ==
Venable was born on October 18, 1913, in Cincinnati, Ohio, the only child of Emerson Venable and Dolores Venable (née Cameron). She graduated from Walnut Hills High School (class of 1930), where her father and grandfather William Henry Venable taught English. She performed in several plays at Walnut Hills, such as Juliet in Romeo and Juliet, the Dream Child in Dear Brutus and Rosalind in As You Like It. She attended Vassar College for a short time, then returned to the University of Cincinnati. She performed in Walter Hampden's touring productions, including Roxane in Cyrano de Bergerac and Ophelia in Hamlet.

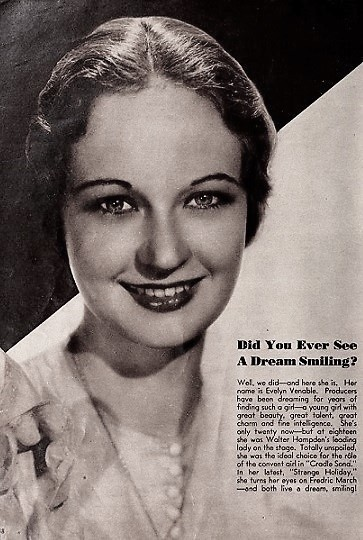
Venable in Movie Classic Magazine, June 1934

During a performance in Los Angeles, she was recognized and offered several film contracts. After initially turning down the offers, she signed a contract with Paramount in 1932. Her contract was unique in that she would not have to cut her hair, pose for leg art, or perform in bit parts. A long-believed apocryphal story sprang up that she was forbidden by her father to engage in any kissing scenes in her films, and although this eventually proved to be false, she does not have any kissing scenes in her more memorable films. She played the lead or second lead in a series of films in the 1930s and claimed to be the original model for the Columbia Pictures logo, but the studio has never confirmed it.

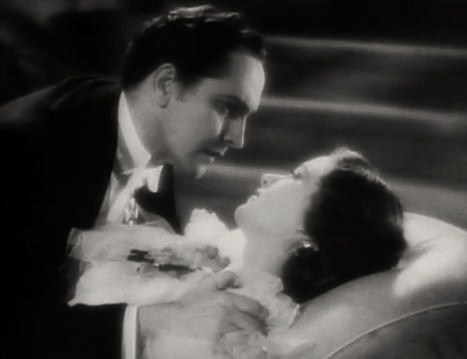
Fredric March and Evelyn Venable in Death Takes a Holiday (1934)

She met cinematographer Hal Mohr on the set of the Will Rogers film David Harum (1934). They argued over her make-up the first day on set, apologized to each other the next, and Mohr proposed by the end of the week. Venable insisted they wait a year to marry because she feared a Hollywood divorce. They married on December 7, 1934, and had two daughters, Dolores and Rosalia. They were vegetarians.

Venable provided the voice of The Blue Fairy for the 1940 Walt Disney film Pinocchio.

In 1943, Venable retired from acting, resumed her studies at UCLA, and became a faculty member there, teaching ancient Greek and Latin and organizing the production of Greek plays within the Classics department.

Her husband Hal Mohr died in 1974. She died of cancer in Coeur d'Alene, Idaho on November 15, 1993, at age 80.

== Partial filmography ==
- Cradle Song (1933) as Teresa
- David Harum (1934) as Ann Madison
- Death Takes a Holiday (1934) as Grazia
- Double Door (1934) as Anne Darrow
- Mrs. Wiggs of the Cabbage Patch (1934) as Lucy Olcott
- The County Chairman (1935) as Lucy Rigby
- The Little Colonel (1935) as Elizabeth
- Vagabond Lady (1935) as Miss Josephine 'Jo' Spiggins
- Alice Adams (1935) as Mildred Palmer
- Harmony Lane (1935) as Susan Pentland
- Streamline Express (1935) as Patricia Wallace
- Star for a Night (1936) as Anna Lind
- North of Nome (1936) as Camilla Bridle
- Happy Go Lucky (1936) as Mary Gorham
- Racketeers in Exile (1937) as Myrtle Thornton
- My Old Kentucky Home (1938) as Lisbeth Calvert
- Hollywood Stadium Mystery (1938) as Pauline Ward
- Female Fugitive (1938) as Peggy Mallory, aka Ann Williams
- The Headleys at Home (1938) as Pamela Headley
- The Frontiersmen (1938) as June Lake
- Heritage of the Desert (1939) as Miriam Naab
- Pinocchio (1940) as The Blue Fairy (voice, uncredited)
- Lucky Cisco Kid (1940) as Emily Lawrence
- He Hired the Boss (1943) as Emily Conway
- Get It (1943)
- Uncivil War Birds (1946) as Beverly (uncredited)
- Fright Night (1947) as Julia Seds (uncredited)
