= Manhattan Shakedown =

1937 film

- Directed by: Leon Barsha
- Written by: Edgar Edwards; Theodore A. Tinsley
- Produced by: Kenneth J. Bishop
- Starring: John Gallaudet; Rosalind Keith; Phyllis Clare
- Cinematography: George Meehan
- Edited by: William Austin
- Production companies: Kenneth J. Bishop Productions; Central Films
- Distributed by: Syndicate Film Exchange
- Release date: December 1937
- Running time: 56 minutes
- Countries: Canada; United States
- Language: English

Manhattan Shakedown is a 1937 American-Canadian crime drama film directed by Leon Barsha and starring John Gallaudet, Rosalind Keith and Phyllis Clare. It was shot in studios in Victoria, British Columbia.

== Cast ==
- John Gallaudet as Jerry Tracey
- Rosalind Keith as Gloria Stoner
- George McKay as Brains
- Reginald Hincks as Dr. Stoner
- Bob Rideout as Mike Orell
- Phyllis Clare as Peggy Orell
- Donald Douglas as Hadley Brown

== Bibliography ==
- Morris, Peter. Embattled Shadows: A History of Canadian Cinema, 1895-1939. McGill-Queen's Press - MQUP, 1992.
- Pitts, Michael R. Poverty Row Studios, 1929-1940. McFarland & Company, 1997.
