= The Headleys at Home =

1938 film

- Directed by: Chris Beute
- Written by: Carrington North (play); William Miles (play); Nicholas Bella
- Produced by: Harvey C. Leavitt; B.W. Richards
- Starring: Evelyn Venable; Grant Mitchell; Vince Barnett
- Cinematography: Harry Forbes
- Edited by: Holbrook N. Todd
- Production company: Standard Pictures
- Distributed by: Standard Pictures
- Release date: November 1, 1938
- Running time: 69 minutes
- Country: United States
- Language: English

The Headleys at Home is a 1938 American comedy film directed by Chris Beute and starring Evelyn Venable, Grant Mitchell and Vince Barnett.

== Cast ==
- Evelyn Venable as Pamela Headley
- Grant Mitchell as Ernest Headley
- Robert Whitney as Bide Murphy
- Betty Roadman as Louisa Headley
- Vince Barnett as Vince Bergson
- Benny Rubin as Dr. McLevy
- Alicia Adams as Alicia Headley
- Louise Beavers as Hyacinth
- Kenneth Harlan as Smooth Adair
- Edward Earle as Van Wyck Schuyler
- Jack Hatfield as Rowland Perkins
- Ethel Clark as Mrs. Brown

== Bibliography ==
- Goble, Alan. The Complete Index to Literary Sources in Film. Walter de Gruyter, 1999
