= The Stoker (1935 film) =

1935 film by Leslie Pearce

- Leslie Fuller, Georgie Harris, Phyllis Clare and Leslie Bradley in the film
- Directed by: Leslie Pearce
- Written by: Sydney Courtenay and Georgie Harris
- Based on: story by Wallace Geoffrey
- Starring: Leslie Fuller; Georgie Harris; Gibson Gowland
- Cinematography: C.J. Van Enger
- Edited by: Ralph Dixon
- Release date: 2 December 1935
- Running time: 71 minutes
- Country: United Kingdom
- Language: English

The Stoker (also known as Shovel up a Bit more Coal) is a 1935 British comedy film directed by Leslie Pearce and starring Leslie Fuller, Georgie Harris and Phyllis Clare. It was written by Sydney Courtenay and Georgie Harris based on a story by Wallace Geoffrey.

== Plot ==
Bill, a ship's engine-room stoker, avoids dismissal for fighting thanks to the kindness of Sir Richard Munro, chairman of the shipping line. In return, Bill promises to watch over Sir Richard’s wild son Frank, who is sent to the stoke-hole to prove his worth. Subsequentlyl Bill visits high society and saves Frank from marrying a scheming woman. Offered a reward by Sir Richard, Bill asks only for permission to punch the chief stoker, who had exploited Bill's promise not to brawl. Sir Richard gladly approves.

== Cast ==
- Leslie Fuller as Bill
- Georgie Harris as Oswald
- Phyllis Clare as Nita
- Leslie Bradley as Frank Munro
- Robert English as Sir Richard Munro
- Olive Melville as Alice
- Patrick Aherne as Russell Gilham
- Gibson Gowland as Steve

== Reception ==
The Monthly Film Bulletin wrote: "The comedy is often extremely good but the standard is uneven and the plot is sometimes rather ridiculous even for a farce. Leslie Fuller and Georgie Harris are excellent foils to each other and give good performances."

Kine Weekly wrote: "A nautical comedy extravaganza, complete with tuneful song and a quota of popular gags so designed as to exploit adequately Leslie Fuller's robust fooling. The plot seldom takes tangible shape, but its limitations fortunately are lightly cloaked by the star's spontaneous comicalities, sound teamwork, and a constant and agreeable change of scene."

The Daily Film Renter wrote: "Played against liner and mansion backgrounds, gives abundant scope to star in part right up his street. ... Contrasts between stokehole and society life, practical jokes and cheeky support by Georgie Harris are subsidiary features, with adequate romantic side issue. Made-to-measure entertainment for vast legion of Leslie Fuller fans. This lavish piece of foolery depends, as usual, not so much on its plot as on the personality of the star, who seizes his opportunity with both hands."
