= Swing That Cheer =

1938 film by Harold D. Schuster

- Theatrical release poster
- Directed by: Harold D. Schuster
- Screenplay by: Charles Grayson; Lee Loeb
- Story by: Thomas Ahearn; F. Maury Schuster
- Produced by: Max Golden
- Starring: Tom Brown; Robert Wilcox; Constance Moore; Andy Devine; Samuel S. Hinds; Ernest Truex
- Cinematography: Elwood Bredell
- Edited by: Edward Curtiss
- Music by: Charles Previn
- Production company: Universal Pictures
- Distributed by: Universal Pictures
- Release date: October 14, 1938
- Running time: 63 minutes
- Country: United States
- Language: English

Swing That Cheer is a 1938 American comedy film directed by Harold D. Schuster and written by Charles Grayson and Lee Loeb. The film stars Tom Brown, Robert Wilcox, Constance Moore, Andy Devine, Samuel S. Hinds and Ernest Truex. The film was released on October 14, 1938, by Universal Pictures.

== Plot ==
Bob and Larry are the two star player of a college team who compete to see who is the best player.

== Cast ==
- Tom Brown as Bob Potter
- Robert Wilcox as Larry Royal
- Constance Moore as Marian Stuart
- Andy Devine as Doc Saunders
- Samuel S. Hinds as Coach McGann
- Ernest Truex as Professor Peabody
- Raymond Parker as Jay Hill
- Margaret Early as Betty Wilson
- Doodles Weaver as Bennett
- Mark Daniels as Winston
- David Oliver as Intern
