= Phyllis Clare =

British actress (1905–1947)

- Born: 12 September 1905; Fulham, London, United Kingdom
- Died: 1 November 1947 (aged 42); Westminster, London, United Kingdom
- Occupation: Actress
- Years active: 1922-1947 (film & TV)

Phyllis Clare (12 September 1905 – 1 November 1947) was a British stage and film actress. She appeared in both British and American films as well as revues in London's West End. She played the female lead in several British quota quickies of the 1930s.

== Selected filmography ==
- The Glorious Adventure (1922)
- The Roadhouse Murder (1932)
- Aunt Sally (1933)
- The Flaw (1933)
- Just My Luck (1933)
- Romance in Rhythm (1934)
- The Deputy Drummer (1935)
- Clive of India (1935)
- The Stoker (1935)
- Hot News (1936)
- Manhattan Shakedown (1937)
- The Last of Mrs. Cheyney (1937)
- Convicted (1938)
- Women Are Like That (1938)

== Bibliography ==
- Low, Rachael. Filmmaking in 1930s Britain. George Allen & Unwin, 1985.
- Wearing, J.P. The London Stage 1930-1939: A Calendar of Productions, Performers, and Personnel. Rowman & Littlefield, 2014.
- Wright, Adrian. Cheer Up!: British Musical Films 1929-1945. The Boydell Press, 2020.
