= The Shadow (1937 film) =

1937 film by Charles C. Coleman

- Lobby card
- Directed by: Charles C. Coleman
- Screenplay by: Arthur T. Horman
- Story by: Milton Raison
- Starring: Rita Hayworth; Charles Quigley; Marc Lawrence
- Cinematography: Lucien Ballard
- Edited by: Byron Robinson
- Production company: Columbia Pictures
- Distributed by: Columbia Pictures
- Release date: December 22, 1937
- Running time: 59 minutes
- Country: United States
- Language: English

The Shadow , also known as The Circus Shadow, is a 1937 American mystery film, directed by Charles C. Coleman for Columbia Pictures. It stars Rita Hayworth, Charles Quigley and Marc Lawrence.

== Plot ==
Attempts to restore the Col. Gillespie Circus have given hope to Mary Gillepsie and her publicist boyfriend Jim. However, the famed equestrian star Senor Martinet has numerous notes signed by the Colonel that are due for payment in one day that eventually lead to his murder with plenty of shadowy suspects to go around.

== Cast ==
- Rita Hayworth as Mary Gillespie
- Charles Quigley as Jim Quinn
- Marc Lawrence as Kid Crow
- Arthur Loft as Sheriff Jackson
- Dick Curtis as Carlos
- Vernon Dent as Dutch Schultz
- Marjorie Main as Hannah Gillespie
- Donald Kirke as Señor Martinet
- Dwight Frye as Vindecco
- Bess Flowers as Marianne
- Bill Irving as Mac
- Eddie Fetherston as Woody
- Sally St. Clair as Dolores
- Sue St. Clair as Rosa
- John Tyrrell as Mr. Moreno
- Beatrice Curtis as Mrs. Moreno
- Ann Doran as Miss Shaw
