= Convicted (1938 film) =

1938 film by Leon Barsha

- Directed by: Leon Barsha
- Starring: Charles Quigley; Rita Hayworth; Marc Lawrence
- Cinematography: George Meehan
- Edited by: William Austin
- Distributed by: Columbia Pictures
- Release date: August 18, 1938
- Running time: 58 minutes
- Country: United States
- Language: English

Convicted is a 1938 American/Canadian action film directed by Leon Barsha. It stars Charles Quigley, Marc Lawrence and 19-year-old Rita Hayworth, on the verge of Hollywood stardom. This is the last of the quota quickies made for the British market by producer Kenneth J. Bishop in Victoria, B.C. from 1933 to 1937. The screenplay by Edgar Edwards was based on the Cornell Woolrich story Face Work.

It was later screened at the 1984 Festival of Festivals as part of Front & Centre, a special retrospective program of artistically and culturally significant films from throughout the history of Canadian cinema.

== Cast ==
- Charles Quigley as Burns, Police Detective
- Rita Hayworth as Jerry Wheeler
- Marc Lawrence as Milton Militis
- George McKay as Kane
- Doreen MacGregor as Mary Allen
- William Irving as 'Cobble-Puss' Coley
- Eddie Laughton as Berger
- Edgar Edwards as Chick Wheeler
- Phyllis Clare as Ruby Rose
- Bob Rideout as Rocco
- Michael Heppell as Pal
- Noel Cusack as Aggie
- Grant MacDonald as Frankie
- Donald Douglas as District Attorney
