= The Devil Is Driving (1937 film) =

1937 film by Harry Lachman

- Theatrical poster for the film
- Directed by: Harry Lachman
- Written by: Richard Blake; Harold Buchman; Guy Endore; Robert Lee Johnson; Joseph Krumgold; Lee Loeb; William McGrath; Jo Milward; Fred Niblo Jr.; Edmond Seward; Eugene Solow; Arthur Strawn
- Produced by: Edward Chodorov; William Perlberg
- Starring: Richard Dix; Joan Perry; Nana Bryant
- Cinematography: Allen G. Siegler
- Edited by: Al Clark
- Music by: Gerard Carbonara; Joseph Nussbaum; George Parrish
- Production company: Columbia Pictures
- Distributed by: Columbia Pictures
- Release date: June 25, 1937
- Running time: 69 minutes
- Country: United States
- Language: English

The Devil Is Driving is a 1937 American drama film directed by Harry Lachman and starring Richard Dix, Joan Perry and Nana Bryant.

== Partial cast ==
- Richard Dix as Paul Driscoll
- Joan Perry as Eve Hammond
- Nana Bryant as Mrs. Sanders
- Ian Wolfe as Elias Sanders
- Elisha Cook Jr. as Tony Stevens
- Henry Kolker as Charles Stevens
- Walter Kingsford as Louis Wooster
- Ann Rutherford as Kitty Wooster
- Frank C. Wilson as Martin Foster
- Paul Harvey as Sam Mitchell
- John Wray as Joe Peters

== Critical reception ==
Mordaunt Hall of the The New York Times commented that "rapidity of action, competent performances [and] periodical wisecracking volleys" were the main ingredients of the film, but "little can be said in favor of the story, for it is wholly implausible, whether it is concerned with stealing automobiles, murder or love."

The Film Daily wrote that the film "is done in the realistic technique, and is very effective ... [it delivers] a big emotional kick throughout, and a terrific object lesson against reckless driving."

== Bibliography ==
- Karen Burroughs Hannsberry. Bad Boys: The Actors of Film Noir. McFarland, 2003.
