= Herman Bing =

German-American actor (1889–1947)

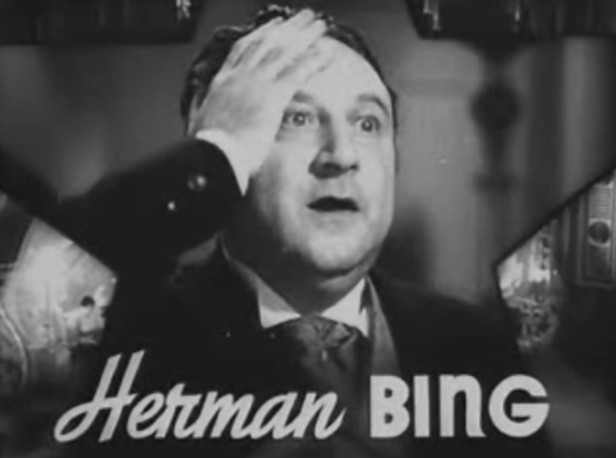
- Bing in The Great Ziegfeld trailer, 1936
- Born: March 30, 1889; Frankfurt am Main, Germany
- Died: January 9, 1947 (aged 57); Los Angeles, California, U.S.
- Occupation: Actor
- Years active: 1921–1946
- Spouse: Carla Lichtenstein
- Children: 1

Herman Bing (March 30, 1889 – January 9, 1947) was a German-American character actor. He acted in more than 120 films and many of his parts were uncredited.

== Biography ==
Bing was born in Frankfurt am Main, Germany.

Bing began his career at the circus, at age 16, and vaudeville showing comedic talent. In 1921 he made his film debut in "Ciska Barna, die Zigeunerin".

He was production chief of several films in Germany before he went to America, in 1923, with director Friedrich Wilhelm Murnau as Murnau's interpreter and assistant director. He also worked under John Ford and Frank Borzage, before establishing himself as a successful character actor well known for his wild-eyed facial expressions and thick German accent. He also provided the voice for the Ringmaster in Walt Disney's Dumbo (1941).

=== Death ===
The start of World War II in Europe caused all things German to be unpopular with audiences. His German accent was no longer in demand in the years following World War II. He became increasingly depressed in the mid-1940s. He was unable to secure work in Hollywood, and committed suicide by gunshot in 1947.

== Selected filmography ==
- Ciska Barna, Die Zigeunerin (1921)
- 4 Devils (1928)
- Married in Hollywood (1929) as German Director
- A Song of Kentucky (1929) as Jake Kleinschmidt
- The Three Sisters (1930) as Von Kosch
- Show Girl in Hollywood (1930) as Mr. Bing – Otis' Assistant
- Men Behind Bars (1931) as Lawyer
- Women Love Once (1931)
- The Great Lover (1931) as Losseck
- The Guardsman (1931) as A Creditor
- Murders in the Rue Morgue (1932) as Franz Odenheimer
- Westward Passage (1932) as Otto Hoopengarner – the Dutchman
- Flesh (1932) as Pepi – Headwaiter
- Hypnotized (1932) as Capt. Otto Von Stormberg
- The Plumber and the Lady (1933 short) as Otto Mauser
- The Nuisance (1933) as Willy
- Dinner at Eight (1933) as Waiter
- My Lips Betray (1933) as Weininger
- Footlight Parade (1933) as Fralick
- The Bowery (1933) as Max Herman
- Fits in a Fiddle (1933 short) as Heinrich Mickelmeier
- College Coach (1933) as Prof. Glantz
- Trimmed in Furs (1934 short) as Engles the Lodge Owner
- Mandalay (1934) as Prof. Kleinschmidt
- Melody in Spring (1934) as Wirt
- I'll Tell the World (1934) as Adolph
- Manhattan Love Song (1934) as Gustave
- Hide-Out (1934) as Jake
- Embarrassing Moments (1934) as Bartender
- When Strangers Meet (1934) as Mr. Oscar Schultz
- The Merry Widow (1934) as Zizipoff
- Crimson Romance (1934) as Himmelbaum
- Love Time (1934) as Istvan
- The Mighty Barnum (1934) as Farmer Schultz
- The Night Is Young (1935) as Nepomuk
- The Great Hotel Murder (1935) as Hans
- The Florentine Dagger (1935) as Baker
- The Misses Stooge (1935 short) as Sazarac the Magician
- In Caliente (1935) as Florist
- Stage Frights (1935 short)
- Calm Yourself (1935) as Mr. Sam Bromberg
- Don't Bet on Blondes (1935) as Prof. Friedrich Wilhelm Gruber
- Every Night at Eight (1935) as Joe Schmidt
- Call of the Wild (1935) as Sam
- Redheads on Parade (1935) as Lionel Kunkel
- His Family Tree (1935) as Mr. 'Stony' Stonehill
- Three Kids and a Queen (1935) as Walter Merkin
- $1,000 a Minute (1935) as Vanderbrocken
- Fighting Youth (1935) as Luigi
- Rose Marie (1936) as Mr. Daniells
- Slide, Nellie, Slide (1936 short) as The Hot Dog King
- Tango (1936) as Mr. Kluckmeyer – Tango Hosiery
- Laughing Irish Eyes (1936) as Weisbecher
- The Great Ziegfeld (1936) as Costumer
- The King Steps Out (1936) as Pretzelberger
- The Three Wise Guys (1936) as Baumgarten
- Human Cargo (1936) as Fritz Schultz
- Blackmailer (1936) as Dr. Rosenkrantz – Coroner
- Adventure in Manhattan (1936) as Otto
- Come Closer, Folks (1936) as Herman
- That Girl from Paris (1936) as 'Hammy' Hammacher
- Champagne Waltz (1937) as Max Snellinek
- Maytime (1937) as August Archipenko
- Oh, What a Knight! (1937 short)
- Beg, Borrow or Steal (1937) as Von Giersdorff – aka Count Herman
- Every Day's a Holiday (1937) as Fritz Krausmeyer
- Paradise for Three (1938) as Mr. Polter
- Bluebeard's Eighth Wife (1938) as Monsieur Pepinard
- Four's a Crowd (1938) as Barber
- Vacation from Love (1938) as Oscar Wittlesbach
- The Great Waltz (1938) as Dommayer
- Sweethearts (1938) as Oscar Engel
- Bitter Sweet (1940) as Market Keeper
- Broadway Melody of 1940 (1940) as Silhouettist (uncredited)
- Dumbo (1941) as The Ringmaster (voice, uncredited)
- The Devil with Hitler (1942 short) as Louis
- The Captain from Köpenick (completed in 1941, released in 1945) as City Hall guardian Kilian
- Where Do We Go from Here? (1945) as Hessian Col. / Von Heisel
- Rendezvous 24 (1946) as Herr Schmidt
- Night and Day (1946) as Ladisaus Smedick – 2nd 'Peaches' (uncredited) (final film role)
