= Lee Loeb =

American screenwriter

- Born: May 1, 1910; New York City, United States
- Died: October 25, 1978 (aged 78); Camarillo, California, United States
- Occupation: Writer
- Years active: 1934–1969 (film & TV)

Lee Loeb (1910–1978) was an American screenwriter of film and television. He worked for several Hollywood studios including Columbia and Republic Pictures before going to work mainly in television production.

He co-wrote the 1944 play Sleep No More with Arthur Strawn.

== Selected filmography ==
- The Case of the Missing Man (1935)
- Falling in Love (1935)
- Blackmailer (1936)
- Don't Gamble with Love (1936)
- Come Closer, Folks (1936)
- Trapped by Television (1936)
- Counsel for Crime (1937)
- It Can't Last Forever (1937)
- Shall We Dance (1937)
- The Devil Is Driving (1937)
- The Main Event (1938)
- Swing That Cheer (1938)
- Three Loves Has Nancy (1938)
- Hawaiian Nights (1939)
- Laugh It Off (1939)
- Forged Passport (1939)
- Remedy for Riches (1940)
- Melody for Three (1941)
- The Perfect Snob (1941)
- It Happened in Flatbush (1942)
- A Gentleman at Heart (1942)
- Dixie Dugan (1943)
- The National Barn Dance (1944)
- Love, Honor and Goodbye (1945)
- Affairs of Geraldine (1946)
- Calendar Girl (1947)
- Seven Keys to Baldpate (1947)
- Undertow (1949)
- Sunny Side of the Street (1951)
- Abbott and Costello Meet Dr. Jekyll and Mr. Hyde (1953)
- Fireman Save My Child (1954)
- Abbott and Costello Meet the Mummy (1955)
- Abbott and Costello Meet the Keystone Kops (1955)

== Bibliography ==
- Keaney, Michael F. Film Noir Guide: 745 Films of the Classic Era, 1940–1959. McFarland, 2003.
- Pollack, Howard. George Gershwin: His Life and Work. University of California Press, 2007.
