= Aunt Sally (film) =

1933 British film by Tim Whelan

- Theatrical release poster
- Directed by: Tim Whelan
- Written by: Guy Bolton; Austin Melford; A. R. Rawlinson; Tim Whelan
- Produced by: Michael Balcon
- Starring: Cicely Courtneidge; Sam Hardy; Phyllis Clare; Hartley Power
- Cinematography: Charles Van Enger
- Edited by: Derek N. Twist
- Music by: Harry M. Woods
- Production company: Gainsborough Pictures
- Distributed by: Gaumont British Distributors
- Release date: December 1933
- Running time: 84 minutes
- Country: United Kingdom
- Language: English

Aunt Sally (U.S. title: Along Came Sally.) is a 1933 British musical comedy film directed by Tim Whelan and starring Cicely Courtneidge, Sam Hardy and Phyllis Clare. It was written by Guy Bolton, Austin Melford, A. R. Rawlinson and Whelan. The film was made by Gainsborough Pictures at their Islington Studios.

== Premise ==
An American impresario trying to set up his new show in London tries to fend off an enthusiastic English performer's attempts to get in his show. She eventually tricks him into giving her the lead part by disguising herself as a French star.

== Cast ==
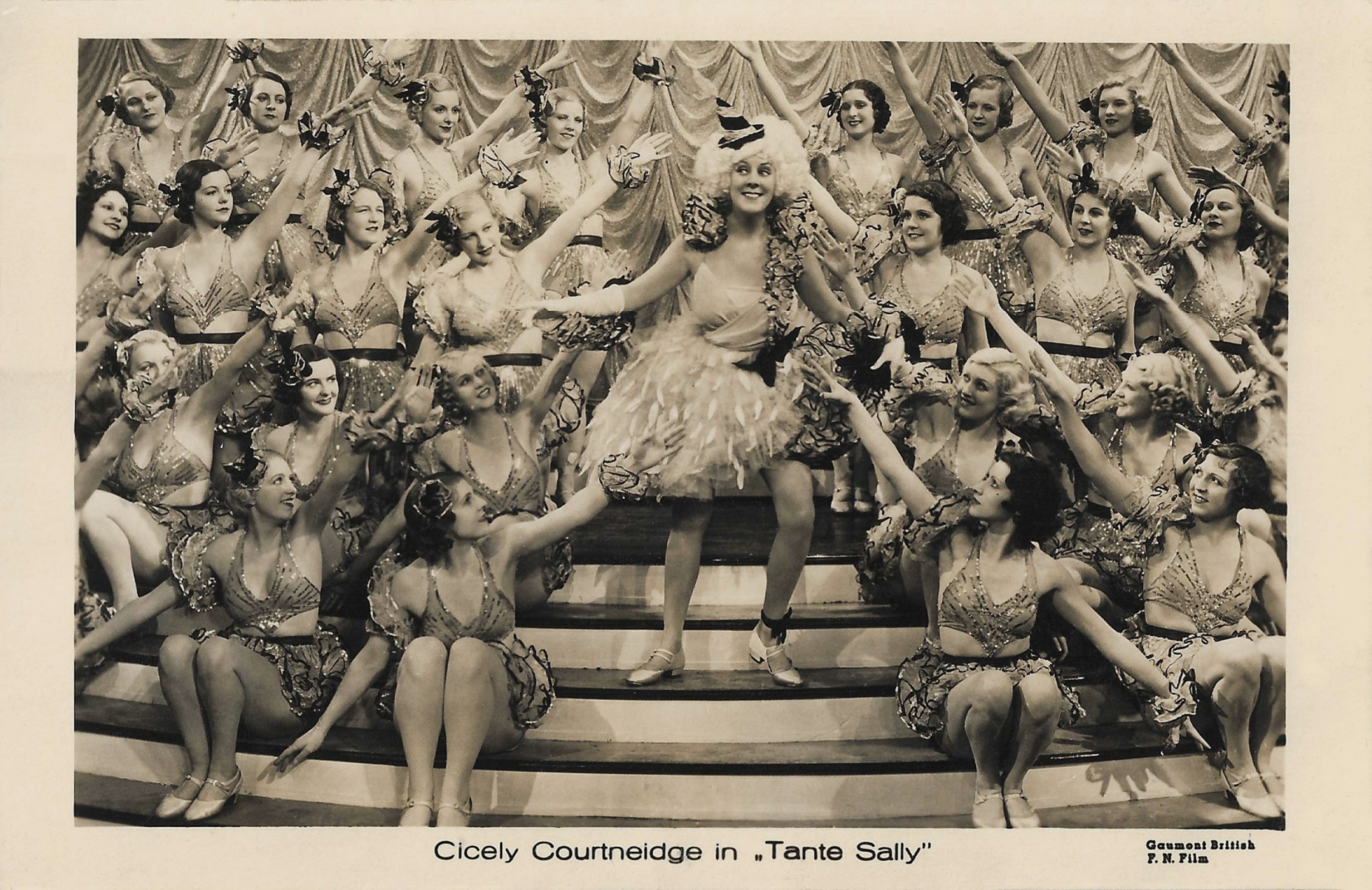
Promotional photo of Cicely Courtneidge

- Cicely Courtneidge as Sally Bird / Mademoiselle Zaza
- Sam Hardy as Michael 'King' Kelly
- Phyllis Clare as Queenie Mills
- Billy Milton as Billy
- Hartley Power as 'Gloves' Clark
- Ben Welden as Casino
- Enrico Naldi as Little Joe
- Ann Hope as Joan
- Ivor McLaren as Madison
- Rex Evans as Percy
- Tubby Cipin as Tubby
- Leslie Holmes as night club singer
- Debroy Somers as bandleader
- The Three Admirals as night club act
- Carlyle Cousins as night club act

== Critical reception ==
Kine Weekly wrote: "Gangster comedy drama, set to music and played against cheery nightclub backgrounds which owes its success to the tireless versatility of Cicely Courtneidge."

The Daily Film Renter wrote: "Bright and snappy song and dance offering, with lilting music and exquisite spectacle knit together by hilarious comedy. ... Cicely Courtneidge in fine form throughout reaching great heights in impersonation of Parisian actress and holding show together with energy and enthusiasm."

The New York Times found Cicely Courtneidge "not nearly as hilarious as most of the characters in Along Came Sally seem to believe," the reviewer concluding that the film has "several fair songs, an equal number of laughs and some dance routines that unsuccessfully ape the grand Hollywood manner."

The Radio Times noted "A vehicle for the irrepressible comedienne and musical comedy star Cicely Courtneidge," calling it, a "good-natured and thoroughly silly little British musical," and concluding, "this is a romp for addicts of 1930s English nostalgia who will enjoy the numbers performed by such forgotten acts of the time."

== Bibliography ==
- Cook, Pam. Gainsborough Pictures. Cassell, 1997.
