= George Dunning =

Canadian filmmaker and animator (1920–79)

- Born: George Garnett Dunning; November 17, 1920; Toronto, Ontario
- Died: February 15, 1979 (aged 58); London, England
- Occupations: Animator, Producer, Director
- Known for: Yellow Submarine

George Garnett Dunning (17 November 1920 – 15 February 1979) was a Canadian filmmaker and animator. He is best known for producing and directing the 1968 film Yellow Submarine.

== Biography ==
Dunning was born in Toronto and studied at the Ontario College of Art & Design, then worked as a freelance illustrator. In 1943, he became the second artist to be recruited by the National Film Board of Canada's Norman McLaren. Between 1944 and 1950, he co-created ten films, including the award-winning Cadet Rousselle, and developed his skills at animating articulated, painted, metal cut-outs.

In 1948, Dunning traveled to Paris and spent a year working for UNESCO under the mentorship of the Czech animator Berthold Bartosch and furthering his experiments with painting on glass. He returned to Canada in 1949, and he and colleague Colin Low took a leave of absence to work on an adaptation of Baron Munchausen (the production was too ambitious and the film was abandoned). Dunning made one more film for the NFB–Family Tree, which he animated and co-directed with Evelyn Lambart. It won two international awards, and a special Canadian Film Award for "outstanding animation".

In 1950, Dunning and colleague Jim MacKay left the NFB to found Toronto's first private animation studio, Graphic Associates, which produced commercials (including the first colour commercial produced in Canada), design work and educational film-strips. It also gave first jobs to budding artists such as Michael Snow, Joyce Wieland and Richard Williams. But the company was not profitable. In 1955, Dunning left for New York; McKay turned Graphic Associates into the successful production company Film Design Ltd.

Dunning moved to New York to accept a post with United Productions of America (UPA) and spent a year as an animator on the series The Gerald McBoing-Boing Show. In 1956, UPA sent him to London to manage its office there, but UPA was in financial trouble and the London office was soon shut down. Dunning decided to start his own production company; he had met John Coates, a London producer who was the nephew of film mogul J. Arthur Rank. Dunning needed someone to manage the business side of his company and the two went into partnership, founding TV Cartoons Ltd. in 1957. By 1961, TVC was producing about one hundred commercials a year, but Dunning also made many personal short films noted for their surrealistic atmosphere and Kafkaesque themes. The Flying Man earned him the Annecy Festival Grand Prix in 1962, while The Apple won the 1963 BAFTA Award for Best Animated Film.

TVC's other 'bread-and-butter' work was training films for the National Coal Board, for which he created the memorable characters Thud and Blunder. In 1967, Dunning created the film Canada is My Piano for the triple rotating screen at the Canadian Pavilion at Expo 67. His 1973 anti-drug film The Maggot won another Annecy Festival award, for Best Information Film.

From 1965 to 1967, Dunning was the main producer of the cartoon series The Beatles. This led to the assignment for Yellow Submarine. The job was highly problematic. While a Disney feature took four years to make, Dunning was given one year, and just $1 million. To meet the deadline, Dunning quadrupled his staff and, aided by Coates and art director Heinz Edelmann, supervised as many as 200 artists. He quarreled with his client, Al Brodax at King Features Syndicate, and the Beatles weren't interested in being involved, only agreeing at the last minute to take part in a live-action epilogue. As Dunning made the film for a flat fee, and made up budget over-runs with his own funds, TVC lost money on the film. But "Yellow Submarine" was a smash hit, bringing Dunning a New York Film Critics Circle award and immense prestige.

While he is not credited, it is believed that Dunning was responsible for the opening credits of Blake Edwards' A Shot in the Dark, along with a series of shorts, including The Digger, for the BBC's Vision On series. His final project, an animated version of Shakespeare's The Tempest, was never completed.

By January 1979, long-standing health issues had come to the fore; Dunning died of a heart attack at his home in London on February 15, 1979, at age 58. His 51 percent of TVC London passed to his wife, Faye. However she had cancer and died the following August. The couple had no children, so their shares reverted to Coates who feared that, without Dunning, clients would no longer be interested in working with the firm. That was not the case, and TVC London continued on, very successfully, until it was sold to Varga Studio in 1999.

== Filmography ==
- Envoyons d'l'avant nos gens, Chants populaires No. 2 - animated short, National Film Board of Canada 1943 - animator and co-director with Jean-Paul Ladouceur
- Là-bas sur ces montagnes, Chants populaires No. 3 - animated short, National Film Board of Canada 1943 - animator and co-director with Jim MacKay
- Filez, filez, ô mon navire, Chants populaires No. 4 - animated short, National Film Board of Canada 1943 - animator and co-director with Jim MacKay
- Grim Pastures - cartoon, National Film Board of Canada 1944 - animator, director
- Keep Your Mouth Shut - animated short, National Film Board of Canada, Norman McLaren 1944 - animator
- Back to Normal - documentary short, National Film Board of Canada 1944 - producer, director
- The Three Blind Mice - animated film, National Film Board of Canada 1945 - director, co-animator with Robert Verrall and Grant Munro
- Cadet Rousselle - documentary short, National Film Board of Canada 1946 - director, co-animator with Colin Low
- Christmas Carols - animated film, National Film Board of Canada 1947 - director, co-animator with Robert Verrall, Grant Munro, Colin Low, Helen MacKay and Lyle Enright
- Family Tree - documentary short, National Film Board of Canada 1950 - animator, co-director with Evelyn Lambart
- The Gerald McBoing-Boing Show - The Election/The Fifty-First Dragon/Twirlinger Twins in the Ballet Lesson -TV series episode, United Productions of America 1956 - animator
- The Wardrobe - cartoon, TV Cartoons 1958 - animator, producer, director
- The Story of the Motor Car Engine - animated documentary, Industrial Animation for Ford Motor Company, Erwin Broner and Richard Williams 1958 - producer
- Power Train - animated training film, Industrial Animation for Ford Motors, Jimmy T. Murakami 1960 - writer, producer
- Redemption of a Retailer - animated film, TV Cartoons, Bill Sewell 1961 - producer, director
- The Ever-Changing Motor Car - animated documentary, TV Cartoons for Ford Motor Company 1962 - co-producer with Robert Adams, co-director with Alan Ball
- The Flying Man - cartoon, TV Cartoons 1962 - animator, producer, director
- The Apple - animated short, TVC London 1962 - animator, director
- Mr. Know-How in Hot Water - animated short, Industrial Animation, Bill Sewell 1962 - producer
- Mr. Know-How in All-Round Comfort - animated short, Industrial Animation, Bill Sewell 1963 - producer
- Discovery - Penicillin - documentary, TVC London, Denis Rich 1964 - producer
- The First Adventures of Thud and Blunder - training film, National Coal Board, Bill Sewell 1964 - producer
- Thud and Blunder: Knock-Off Time - training film, National Coal Board, Alan Ball 1964 - producer
- Thud and Blunder: Haulage Hazards - training film, National Coal Board, Bill Sewell 1964 - producer
- The Insects - animated film, TVC London, Jimmy T. Murakami 1964 - co-producer with Jimmy T. Murakami
- Charley -TV movie, TVC London 1965 - producer, director
- Kindred Spirit Scotch Whisky's Guide to International Relations - animated TV film, TVC London, Alan Ball, 1965 - producer
- The Loco - training film, National Coal Board, 1965 - producer, director
- The Beatles - TV series, TVC London et al. 1965-1967 - producer (33 episodes)
- The Helmet - training film, National Coal Board, 1966 - producer, director
- The Roof - training film, National Coal Board, 1966 - producer, director
- Safety Boots - training film, National Coal Board, 1966 - producer, director
- Thud and Blunder: Materials Handling - training film, National Coal Board, Bill Sewell 1966 - producer
- Canada is My Piano - animated short film, National Film Board of Canada and Expo 67 - writer, producer, director
- The Chair - short film, Bill Sewell 1967 - producer
- The Ladder - short film, 1967 - producer, director
- Shaped for a Living - animated film, Canadian Broadcasting Corporation 1967 - creator, co-producer with John Arnold
- Tidy Why - training film, National Coal Board, Bill Sewell 1964 - producer
- Yellow Submarine - feature, TVC London/Apple Corps/King Features Syndicate 1968 - animator, director
- Lazy River - animated film, TVC London 1968 - producer, director
- Discovering Radar - animated film, TVC London, Jim Duffy and John Fletcher 1968 - producer
- Cod Fishing - animated film, TVC London, Bill Sewell 1969 - producer
- Hands, Knees and Bumps a Daisy - training film, National Coal Board, 1969 - producer, director
- A Sense of Responsibility - training film, National Coal Board, Alan Ball 1970 - producer
- The Self-Breathing Apparatus - documentary short, TVC London, Alan Ball 1970 - producer
- Moon Rock -short film, TVC London 1970 - producer, director
- Horses of Death - training film, National Coal Board 1972, producer, co-director with Jim Duffy
- Damon the Mower - short film, TVC London 1972 - animator, producer, director
- How Not to Keep a Head While Shot-Firing - training film, National Coal Board, 1973 producer, co-director with Jim Duffy
- The Maggot - short film, TVC London 1973 - producer, director
- Plant a Tree - documentary short, Department for Environment, Food and Rural Affairs 1973 - director, producer
- Dandruff - cartoon, TVC London, Jim Duffy 1973 - co-producer with Jim Duffy
- Five Problems in Communications - training film, National Coal Board, Jim Duffy 1974 - producer
- Along These Lines - documentary short, Bell Canada, Peter Pearson 1974 - animator
- Teamwork - training film, National Coal Board, Jim Duffy 1975 - producer
- Safety Senses - training film, National Coal Board, Jim Duffy 1975 - producer
- The Devil May Care - training film, National Coal Board, Jim Duffy 1975 - producer

== Awards ==
Cadet Rousselle (1946)

- Filmfestival del Garda, Gardone Riviera: Award of Merit, 1949
- American Film and Video Festival, New York: Blue Ribbon, 1960
- Columbus International Film & Animation Festival, Columbus, Ohio: Chris Statuette, 1961
- Columbus International Film & Animation Festival, Columbus, Ohio: Chris Certificate, Education, Art and Music, 1961

Family Tree (1950)

- Salerno Film Festival, Salerno: First Prize – Grand Award, Best of All Entries, 1951
- 3rd Canadian Film Awards, Ottawa: Special Award for Outstanding Animation and Musical Score, 1951
- Rapallo International Film Festival, Rapallo: Second Prize, Art Films, 1957

Buffoons (1950)

- 3rd Canadian Film Awards, Ottawa: Special Citation, 1951

The Flying Man (1962)

- Annecy Festival, Annecy: Grand Prix, 1962

The Apple (1962)

- Locarno Film Festival, Locarno: Best Animated Film, Short Films, 1962
- 16th British Academy Film Awards, London: BAFTA Award for Best Animated Film, 1963

Yellow Submarine (1968)

- National Society of Film Critics Circle, New York: Special Award for Feature-Length Animation, 1968
- Locarno Film Festival, Locarno: Special Mention, Feature Films, 1968

The Maggot (1973)

- Annecy Festival, Annecy: Best Information Film, 1973

== Sources ==
- Axelrod, Mitchell. Beatletoons: The Real Story Behind The Cartoon Beatles. Wynn, 1999. Lenburg, Jeff. Encyclopedia Of Animated Cartoons. Checkmark Books, 1999.
- Lehman, Christopher P. American Animated Cartoons of the Vietnam Era: A Study of Social Commentary in Films and Television Programs, 1961-1973. McFarland, 2007.
- TV.com.
- The Big Cartoon Database.
