= Fugitive Lady =

Fugitive Lady may refer to:

- Fugitive Lady (1934 film), American crime romance
- Fugitive Lady (1938 film), British title of American crime romance Female Fugitive
- Fugitive Lady (1950 film), British-Italian crime drama
