= The Black Castle (radio program) =

Radio mystery-terror program

- Running time: 15 minutes
- Country of origin: United States
- Language: English
- Home station: WOR
- Syndicates: Mutual
- Starring: Don Douglas
- Directed by: W. Keys Perrin
- Produced by: W. Keys Perrin
- Original release: 1943 – 1944

The Black Castle is an old-time radio mystery-terror program in the United States. The 15-minute program was broadcast on Mutual in 1943 and 1944.

== Schedule ==
Initially, the program was broadcast on Tuesday and Thursday nights. On January 31, 1944, a Monday-Friday afternoon schedule was added, with plans to drop the evening broadcasts if the afternoon episodes were successful.

== Format ==
This anthology program featured "chilling dramatizations of people trapped in unexpected and dangerous situations." An article in the trade publication Broadcasting described The Black Castle as "a ghost story series," noting that it was one of five shows announced by the Mutual Broadcasting System "immediately following the new 'aggressive' policy calling for new and better programs." The program originated at WOR in New York City and was featured as part of a "WOR Matinee," along with Consumer Quiz and Songs by Sunny Skylar.

== One-man cast ==
The program's continuing characters were the host, the Wizard of the Black Castle, and his raven, Diablo. Don Douglas played all roles in each episode and was the announcer. A review of The Black Castle in the trade publication Billboard complimented Douglas's handling of multiple roles in the drama. Bob Francis wrote: "Except for the fact that he is inclined to ham the wizard, making the role often seem more silly than awesome, Douglas puts on a good 15 minutes. His vocal changes are sharp and clear, and his characterizations come over effectively."

W. Keys Perrin was the producer and director.
