= Come Closer, Folks =

1936 film

- Directed by: D. Ross Lederman
- Written by: Aben Kandel; Lee Loeb; Harold Buchman
- Produced by: Columbia Pictures
- Starring: James Dunn
- Cinematography: Henry Freulich
- Edited by: Byron Robinson
- Distributed by: Columbia Pictures
- Release date: November 7, 1936
- Running time: 61 minutes
- Country: United States
- Language: English

Come Closer, Folks is a 1936 American comedy film directed by D. Ross Lederman. A print is preserved in the Library of Congress collection.

== Plot ==
Jim Keene, a con-man, works himself up into an executive position of a large department store.

== Cast ==
- James Dunn as Jim Keene
- Marian Marsh as Peggy Woods
- Wynne Gibson as Mae
- George McKay as Rudolph
- Gene Lockhart as Elmer Woods
- Herman Bing as Herman
- John Gallaudet as Pitchman
- Gene Morgan as Pitchman
- Wallis Clark as Mr. Houston
