= Lady from Nowhere =

1936 film by Gordon Wiles

- Directed by: Gordon Wiles
- Written by: Ben Grauman Kohn; Fred Niblo Jr.; Arthur Strawn; Joseph Krumgold
- Starring: Mary Astor; Charles Quigley; Thurston Hall
- Cinematography: Henry Freulich
- Edited by: James Sweeney
- Production company: Columbia Pictures
- Distributed by: Columbia Pictures
- Release date: December 23, 1936
- Running time: 60 minutes
- Country: United States
- Language: English

Lady from Nowhere is a 1936 American crime film directed by Gordon Wiles and starring Mary Astor, Charles Quigley and Thurston Hall.

== Plot ==
After witnessing a gangland killing a young woman has to go into hiding.

== Cast ==
- Mary Astor as Polly Dunlap
- Charles Quigley as Earl Daniels
- Thurston Hall as James Gordon Barnes
- Victor Kilian as Zeke Hopper
- Spencer Charters as Alexander Scorzo
- Norman Willis as Ed Lustig, aka Alfred Brewster
- Gene Morgan as Mike Dugan
- Rita La Roy as Mabel Donner
- Claudia Coleman as Dorothy Barnes
- Matty Fain as Henchman Frankie
- John Tyrrell as Henchman Nick
- John Hamilton as Commissioner
- George DeNormand as Chauffeur
- Edwin Stanley as Editor
- Frank Melton as Bert Withers
- Jack Kennedy as Rube Wallace
- Victor Potel as Abner
- Horace Murphy as Lem
- Gennaro Curci as Alex
- Lowell Drew as Veterinary
- Robert McKenzie as Constable
- Edward LeSaint as Ed Van Zandt
- Joseph E. Bernard as Conductor
- C.L. Sherwood as First Fireman
- Wedgwood Nowell
- Harry Tyler as Fletcher, Murdered Gangster

== Bibliography ==
- Lowe, Denise. An Encyclopedic Dictionary of Women in Early American Films: 1895-1930. Routledge, 2014.
