= The Case of the Missing Man =

1935 film

- Directed by: D. Ross Lederman
- Screenplay by: Lee Loeb; Harold Buchman
- Story by: Lee Loeb; Harold Buchman
- Produced by: Irving Briskin
- Starring: Roger Pryor; Joan Perry; Thurston Hall
- Cinematography: Allen G. Siegler
- Edited by: Al Clark
- Production company: Columbia Pictures
- Distributed by: Columbia Pictures
- Release date: October 20, 1935
- Running time: 58 minutes
- Country: United States
- Language: English

The Case of the Missing Man is a 1935 American mystery crime film directed by D. Ross Lederman and starring Roger Pryor, Joan Perry and Thurston Hall.

== Plot ==
A newspaper photographer is persuaded by his girlfriend to quit his job and set up his own photographic studio. However, when business proves to be slack he becomes a roving cameraman, taking pictures of passers-by in the streets. Things take a dangerous turn when he takes a snap of a violent criminal emerging from a bank robbery.

== Cast ==
- Roger Pryor as Jimmy Hudson
- Joan Perry as Peggy Roberts
- Thurston Hall as Boyle
- Arthur Hohl as Steve
- George McKay as Frank Nelson
- Tom Dugan as Jack Clark
- James Burke as Police Sergeant Rorty
- Arthur Rankin as Hank
- Paul Guilfoyle as Joe (uncredited)

== Bibliography ==
- Dick, Bernard F. Columbia Pictures: Portrait of a Studio. University Press of Kentucky, 2015.
