= Racketeers in Exile =

1937 film by Erle C. Kenton

- Directed by: Erle C. Kenton
- Written by: Harry Sauber; Robert T. Shannon
- Starring: George Bancroft; Evelyn Venable; Wynne Gibson
- Cinematography: Lucien Ballard
- Edited by: Otto Meyer
- Music by: Gerard Carbonara; Joseph Nussbaum
- Production company: Columbia Pictures
- Distributed by: Columbia Pictures
- Release date: March 30, 1937
- Running time: 60 minutes
- Country: United States
- Language: English

Racketeers in Exile is a 1937 American crime film directed by Erle C. Kenton and starring George Bancroft, Evelyn Venable and Wynne Gibson.

== Cast ==
- George Bancroft as William Waldo
- Evelyn Venable as Myrtle Thornton
- Wynne Gibson as 'Babe' DeVoe
- Marc Lawrence as 'Blackie' White
- John Gallaudet as 'Happy'
- George McKay as 'Horseface'
- William Burress as Thornton
- Helen Lowell as Mrs. Abigail Thornton
- Jack Clifford as Thyrus Jamison
- Garry Owen as Sy
- Jonathan Hale as Alden Parker
- Richard Carle as Regan Langdon aka 'Porky'
- Ray Bennett as 1st Killer
- Edward Cecil as Parker's Butler
- Georgie Cooper as Purity League Member
- Robert Dudley as Purity League Member
- Betty Farrington as Sadie's Mother
- Harry Fleischmann as 2nd Killer
- Sam Flint as Finance Man
- Mary Gordon as Irish Woman
- Alfred P. James as Purity League Member
- Gladden James as G-Man
- Edward LeSaint as Physician
- Wilfred Lucas as Finance Man
- James T. Mack as Minister
- Ralph Malone as G-Man
- Walter Merrill as G-Man
- Wedgwood Nowell as Finance Man
- Jessie Perry as Purity League Member
- Kathryn Sheldon as Purity League Member
- Tommy Tucker as Little Boy
- Lois Verner as Sadie
- Pierre Watkin as Chief G-Man
- Crawford Weaver as G-Man

== Bibliography ==
- Hardy, Phil. The BFI Companion to Crime. University of California Press, 1997.
