= Heritage of the Desert (1939 film) =

1939 film

- Directed by: Lesley Selander
- Screenplay by: Norman Houston; Harrison Jacobs
- Based on: The Heritage of the Desert by Zane Grey
- Produced by: Harry Sherman
- Starring: Donald Woods; Evelyn Venable; Russell Hayden; Robert Barrat; Sidney Toler; C. Henry Gordon; Willard Robertson
- Cinematography: Russell Harlan
- Edited by: Sherman A. Rose
- Music by: Victor Young
- Production company: Paramount Pictures
- Distributed by: Paramount Pictures
- Release date: June 23, 1939
- Running time: 73 minutes
- Country: United States
- Language: English

Heritage of the Desert is a 1939 American Western film directed by Lesley Selander and written by Norman Houston and Harrison Jacobs. The film stars Donald Woods, Evelyn Venable, Russell Hayden, Robert Barrat, Sidney Toler, C. Henry Gordon and Willard Robertson. It is based on the 1910 novel The Heritage of the Desert by Zane Grey. The film was released on June 23, 1939, by Paramount Pictures.

== Cast ==
- Donald Woods as John Abbott
- Evelyn Venable as Miriam Naab
- Russell Hayden as David Naab
- Robert Barrat as Andrew Naab
- Sidney Toler as Nosey
- C. Henry Gordon as Henry Holderness
- Willard Robertson as Henchman Nebraska
- Paul Guilfoyle as Snap Thornton
- Paul Fix as Henchman Chick Chance
- John 'Skins' Miller as Postmaster John Twerk
- Reginald Barlow as Judge Stevens
