= Associated Screen News of Canada =

Canadian film production company

- Industry: Film Production
- Founded: 1920
- Founder: Canadian Pacific Railway; Sir Edward Wentworth Beatty; Charles Urban
- Defunct: 1973
- Headquarters: Montreal, Canada
- Key people: Bernard Norrish; John M. Alexander; Norman Hull; Byron Harmon; Roy Tash; Gordon Sparling; Alfred Jacquemin; William Singleton; Paul Nathanson; Maxwell Cummings; Murray Briskin
- Products: Sponsored films News reels Industrial films Documentaries; Theatrical shorts Film processing
- Owner: Canadian Pacific Railway; Du-Art Laboratories; Bellevue-Humphries; Bellevue Pathé; Astral Media

Associated Screen News of Canada (ASN) was a Montreal-based film production company. It was the largest private film production company in Canada from the mid-1920s to the 1950s.

== Background ==
The first-ever sponsored film, the precursor of both the documentary and the television commercial, was created in 1898 by the Canadian farm equipment manufacturer Massey Harris, which wanted to show its reaper-binder at work on Ontario farms. By 1900, Massey Harris founder Hart Massey was running clips of the Second Boer War at his theatre, Toronto's Massey Hall, to raise funds for the Canadian Patriotic Fund.

These films came from the English producer Charles Urban, whose company, the Warwick Trading Company, produced and/or distributed three-quarters of the films exhibited in Britain at that time. In 1900, to encourage tourism and immigration, the Canadian Pacific Railway (CPR) hired Urban to shoot films in Canada and distribute them in Britain. In 1903, Urban left Warwick to found the Charles Urban Trading Company which, beginning in 1903, was a major distributor of Canadian films in Britain, including those made by the CPR. As early as 1891, the CPR had been producing films to attract British and American tourists and encourage rail travel in western Canada. These films were so successful that, to this day, when many non-Canadians think of Canada, they think of the Rocky Mountains, Banff and Lake Louise; in 2019, Banff National Park attracted 4.2 million international visitors.

Also in 1903, Urban began making his own propaganda films in Canada. He sent three British cinematographers to Canada, and formed the Bioscope Company of Canada specifically to produce films for the CPR. (Nova Scotia's Canadian Bioscope Company was not related to Urban's firm.) In 1903 and 1904, Bioscope made the 35-film series Living Canada, re-released in 1906 as Wonders of Canada. He would continue to make CPR films until 1917, all while remaining based in London.

In 1909, Urban began commercializing the Kinemacolor process through the Natural Color Kinematograph Company. Several independent companies were formed around to exploit the Kinemacolor patent, the most notable being the Kinemacolor Company of America. However, the Kinemacolor process fell into obscurity after Urban lost the Kinemacolor patent in a 1915 lawsuit. In 1917, when the US entered World War I, he joined William Kissam Vanderbilt's company, Official Government Pictures (OGP), which had the contract to distribute propaganda films in America. In 1919, Urban agreed to buy William Randolph Hearst's film studio in Irvington, New York and suggested to CPR president Edward Wentworth Beatty that they partner to establish Associated Screen News, New York, which would produce and sell newsreel stories. Also that year, Urban and OGP's president George McLeod Baynes bought The Selznick News and established a newsreel service called Kinograms.

== Formation of Associated Screen News ==
Meanwhile, in 1918, the Canadian Government established a film production division whose purpose was to promote international interest in Canada's growing industrial strength and abundance of natural resources; the main goal was to attract investment and immigration.

In 1916, the United States Bureau for Commercial Economics asked the Canadian government for films detailing natural resources and hydro development possibilities in Canada—it wished to circulate these films to potential American investors. The Canadian government asked the Water Powers Branch of the Department of the Interior to produce these films. This was because its head draftsman, Bernard Norrish, was working on developing new techniques in photographic analysis. In this capacity, Norrish had visited the Essanay Film Company in Chicago. Norrish contracted Essanay to make these new films and, in 1916 and 1917, six films were produced—five on hydro-electric power, one on wheat harvesting. Initially, Norrish was meant to oversee production, but he was an aggressive perfectionist and ended up writing, directing and editing them. His superiors were so impressed, they transferred him to the Department of Trade and Commerce which, in 1918, established the Exhibits and Publicity Bureau (to be re-named the Canadian Government Motion Picture Bureau). It was the world's first government film production operation and Norrish was its director.

In June 1920, Charles Urban announced the formation of Associated Screen News, New York Ltd. and of its wholly owned subsidiary, Associated Screen News of Canada. The formation of the new company was financed by a private share offering in both the United States and Canada.

In July 1920, Associated Screen News (ASN) was incorporated by the Canadian Pacific Railway, which invested $250,000.00 in the company. However, while it is widely assumed that CPR owned the company, in his 1961 paper Motion Pictures in Canada : A Brief History of the Development of Canadian Film, Guy L. Coté notes that this investment bought the CPR only a 50% interest in ASN, and refers to "American interests" as its founders. Given Urban's announcement and the fact that its formation was his idea, that Norrish's first act at ASN was to produce the Kinograms Series, that Urban was based in the U.S. with an American company, and was in business with the likes of Vanderbilt and Hearst, it is reasonable to assume that the "private share offering" was closely held, and that the "American interests" referred to by Coté were Urban and his associates.

Regardless of who its investors were, the CPR was the majority shareholder of Associated Screen News Canada. Its president was the CPR's chief engineer, Colonel John Stoughton Dennis; Beatty persuaded Bernard Norrish to leave the government bureau and become its General Manager. Norrish brought one person with him from Ottawa to Montreal, the cinematographer John M. Alexander who, usually uncredited, handled production and directed most of ASN's early films.

Urban had over-stepped; much of his expected cash flow disappeared when Beatty insisted that all CPR films be made in Canada. In 1924, Associated Screen News, New York Ltd. failed. All of its shares were transferred to the CPR. Beatty closed the New York operation and named Bernard Norrish President of Associated Screen News of Canada.

== 1920s ==
In the short time that he was head of the government bureau in Ottawa, Norrish created an efficient laboratory, production studio and distribution system. He and Alexander did the same thing with ASN. By 1923, Norrish had secured a contract to supply a Canadian section to Pathé News, and had distribution deals with Universal Pictures, Gaumont-British News, Gaumont-British Weekly, Pictorial Life, the Canadian Travel Film Library, Empire-Universal Films, Educational Films Corp. of America, and Urban's two distribution companies, Kinogram News and The Selznick News. These newsreels were projected in 4,000+ theatres in the U.S., Canada, Great Britain, Australia and South America.

In 1926, Associated Screen News, which had been operating out of an old decommissioned Baptist church, built new facilities in Montreal's Notre-Dame-de-Grâce neighbourhood; over the front door, oddly, was a frieze of an Indian chief in headdress. This facility included the $150,000.00 Associated Screen News Laboratory. That was an enormous sum at the time, but it quickly paid for itself. Previously, foreign distributors had to print their own films and ship them to Canada. In 1925, the Canadian government slapped a tariff on the importation of films–six cents a foot. ASN could now print their films, meaning that distributors only had to pay the tax once. By 1929, the lab was processing 22 million feet of film a year, for most American and British distributors, and film printing soon accounted for one third of the company's profits. Even more lucrative was the provision of intertitles, explanatory texts added to silent films to explain passages of time or important dialogue. Norrish and Alexander were able to create bi-lingual inter-titles and splice these into American features. Associated Screen News became the first firm in North America to provide this service which, for many years, was a large source of its revenue.

Demand for films was soaring, but not for American films. America's late entry into the First World War, and its subsequent claims of glory, were seen as offensive and Canadians were openly resentful of films depicting American heroism in the war. There were riots in theatres that showed such films; in some places, images of the American flag were banned. Canadians wanted Canadian and British films. ASN's newsreel and film production increased rapidly and the company employed cinematographers from coast to coast, including Banff-based Byron Harmon, who shot most of the Rocky Mountain footage, and Roy Tash in Vancouver. Tash, who was known as "Mr. Newspictures of Canada" and became famous when he was the first to film the Dionne Quintuplets, went to work for ASN in 1925 and stayed for 25 years; it was Tash who filmed most of the Canadian news stories. By 1927, ASN had 60 employees; by 1930, 100+ employees.

In addition to immediately beginning with the production of newsreels, Norrish and Alexander created the Kinograms series, silent travelogues about routes served by the CPR's trains, ferries or ships. They added sponsored films, documentaries and general-interest films, and Norrish was careful to support the CPR; if a politician or celebrity was in a film, that film was shot in a CPR hotel, or the person was seen on a CPR train, or wharf, or ship. ASN's art department produced post cards and booklets for sale in CPR's numerous hotels, and ASN operated the hotel kiosks. In 1925, Alexander was sent, with a full staff, on Canadian Pacific cruises to the West Indies and South America where, for a fee, they filmed passengers in exotic locations and processed the films in on-board darkrooms.

ASN's main mandate was to produce CPR films. But there was more to these films than making the CPR look good. In the late 1890s, hand in hand with the Canadian government, the CPR had created its own Colonization and Immigration Department, which sold land, through loans it provided, to immigrants who bought farms in western Canada. In the 1890s, it began producing films to show to potential British immigrants; the 1898 film Ten Years in Manitoba, by James Freer shows rich prairie soil and a happy family in an attractive house. One purpose of the films produced by ASN through the 1920s was to show the opportunity provided by Canada’s wilderness, and to absolutely not show the hardships suffered by those who settled the Canadian prairies.

While central European immigrants easily adjusted to difficult life in the west, British immigrants were mainly city dwellers who had been drawn in by the CPR films. In 1923, settlers revolted against the CPR because life in Canada had been misrepresented—they had not been told about the Canadian winters (for many years, the CPR would not allow images of snow in its films). The business of farming had overwhelmed them. They were unable to repay their debt; in 1922, 316 farms were abandoned. The CPR responded by writing off interest and dropped the price of land to as little as $10 an acre; when the Great Depression hit, land was offered for as little as $5 an acre.

But, from 1903 to 1917, Charles Urban was busy making films about the glories of life on the prairie, and ASN continued this through the 1920s, making dozens of films to encourage immigration. For the Scots, there was the 1926 film Clan Donald : A British Farm Colony. In 1929, Roy Tash made From British Home to Canadian Farm, a two-reel film extolling the virtues of farming the Canadian prairie; in 1928, he made British Success in Canadian Farming, in 1930, Canada, The New Homeland. All other CPR films benefited the CPR in some way, and not just by encouraging tourists and immigrants; as industry could not function without rail, industrial films were just as important.

== 1930s ==
By the 1930s, hundreds of small production studios had cropped up across Canada, particularly in Ontario. Beatty suggested that ASN move to Toronto, but Norrish refused—it was unnecessary. Few companies could compete with ASN. Not only did it have endless amounts of cash from the CPR, but the CPR transported film crews, provided their accommodation, and handled the shipping of ASN's raw stock and completed films, which was a considerable expense at the time. Even the government bureau had difficulty competing with ASN; Norrish maintained his contacts in the federal government, and was making films for the Parks Branch. Ray Peck, who had taken over from Norrish as head of the Exhibits and Publicity Bureau (now called the Canadian Government Motion Picture Bureau) complained that ASN was undermining the bureau. But Peck wasn't keeping up; in 1931, ASN became able to produce films with sound, while the federal bureau produced only silent films well into the 1930s.

One filmmaker who had been frustrated at the federal film bureau was Gordon Sparling, who joined ASN in 1930. He had left the Exhibits Bureau to work for Paramount Pictures in New York. In 1929, he was hired to make the film Forward Canada! for General Motors; it was to be shot in Montreal but his equipment supplier reneged and he went to ASN. When Norrish saw the completed film, he was impressed and offered Sparling a job. Sparling wanted to make theatrical shorts, for which he said he needed a fixed budget of $3,000.00 each. Norrish agreed, with two conditions: that production costs would be covered by theatrical revenue, and that Sparling would also produce ASN's sponsored and industrial films.

One reason for Norrish's ready acceptance of Sparling's budget was another tariff enacted by the Canadian government in 1931, on the importation of motion picture cameras and sound recorders. Each time a foreign cameraman entered Canada, he would be taxed on his equipment. This tax greatly reduced the number of American cameramen shooting in Canada and, with the boom in Canadian filmmaking, and an increase in the number of production companies, there was no longer a pool of cinematographers looking for work. Norrish wanted stability in personnel, he wanted to expand his production, and Sparling was willing to make the commitment.

Norrish also wanted films exactly like Forward Canada!. It was only four minutes long, but it had a persuasive power. General Motors wanted people to spend their way out of the Great Depression, and this film told people that, if they worked hard, they could have what they wanted and improve their lives. It dovetailed with Norrish's belief that every person possessed what he called "eye-mindedness" and that, if you gave someone an instruction through suggestion, it would leave an indelible impression–as long as they didn't realize that they were being instructed. Sparling achieved this in Forward Canada!, and Norrish intended to sell the concept to his clients.

Canadian Cameos Series
Sparling proposed a monthly series called Canadian Cameos, vignettes about Canadian life, covering everything from music and sports, to history, art and First Nations culture. He described the cameos as "designed for general theatre audiences—no axes to grind, no 'messages' to hammer home, just good entertainment with a Canadian flavour". Between 1930 and 1954, Sparling made 84 episodes (it went on hiatus during the war). Of this series, Guy L. Coté wrote: "Few of Sparling's films betray much pre-occupation with the aesthetics of film expression, and he remains basically an unsophisticated showman with an engaging naivete of style, and a love for entertaining his audience with the fads and fashions of the day." Cote noted, however, that some of the films were interesting, particularly Grey Owl's Little Brother (1932), Rhapsody in Two Languages (1934), Acadian Spring Song (1935), Ballet of the Mermaids (1938), The Thousand Days (1942), Sitzmarks the Spot (1949) and The Roaring Game (1952).

While it may have had its detractors, not only did Canadian Cameos constitute the only continuous creative filmmaking effort in Canada in the 1930s, it introduced the first Canadian theatrical films with sound, and the 1939 vignette Royal Banners Over Ottawa introduced colour to Canadian filmmaking. It was also extensively distributed, throughout Canada, the U.S. Britain, Europe, Australia and the Far East and, through the '30s, was the only representation of Canada that anyone saw. The series was also lucrative; it worked with newsreel sales, and, until 1935, all of its sports-related films were cross-marketed under a separate series called Sports Chats.

One reason for its success was that it portrayed Canadian society as most Canadians believed it was. Audiences were now more sophisticated; they did not want propaganda. Theatre owners wanted films to entertain audiences, not alienate them. Sparling had a talent for making the most mundane topic seem interesting, even comforting. They did not challenge or confront viewers, or contain anything controversial. Sexual content was not a factor; in the 1930s, "controversial" meant anything to do with communism, labour strife and trade unionism. In 1931, Famous Players, Canada's largest theatre chain, announced that "no newsreels of a controversial nature" would be shown in its theatres. And, even though the episodes were released during the Great Depression, no evidence of the Depression is seen in any of the cameos. Censorship was widespread, theatre owners did not take risks, and Sparling made films that theatre owners would buy.

When Sparling was hired, Norrish reorganized ASN, dividing it into four divisions: newsreel, CPR productions, laboratory and Sparling’s production department, which was responsible for dramatic and sponsored films. It was called Associated Screen Studios and initially consisted of Sparling and the cinematographer Alfred Jacquemin. Where cameramen had shot newsreel footage for newsreels only, and others shot for CPR films only, their film was now used wherever it was needed, although they retained a great deal of autonomy and were not necessarily working at Sparling's direction. Due to cost constraints, few films were released in French; any French films were dubbed for sale, in packages, to French-speaking markets.

Through the 1930s, ASN supplied Canadian news footage to all American newsreels except Fox Movietone News, which had its own Canadian team of cameramen. By the late 1930s, ASN was able to add pre-recorded music, and dub films for release to French, German, Danish and Spanish audiences. In 1935 the company purchased the collection of Montreal photographer William Notman, adding Notman's 400,000 negatives to its inventory. Also in 1935, Sparling convinced Norrish to build a sound studio. This studio would be the first in Canada and, for some time, the most sophisticated sound studio in the world.

Sponsored Films
The sound stage was necessary to produce the only feature-length film ASN would make in the 1930s, House in Order, a 55-minute black-and-white film produced for Shell Oil. Made to promote Shell's products and services, and featuring 11 actors (ASN employees), it was a film about the romantic adventures of a service station attendant and his wife.

This was a real departure for ASN which, by now, had produced hundreds of sponsored films, most under 10 minutes in length. By the 1920s, all marketers knew that short films were the best form of advertising; newsprint ads and signage were the only other options. In addition to theatrical distribution, these films were provided, free of charge, to service clubs, church groups, women’s institutes and schools, often with a speaker to present the film and answer questions. In some cases, corporations would rent theatres and host Hollywood-style premieres. In theatres, an evening's program would include a cartoon, a newsreel, a sponsored film, and then the feature. Sponsored films were the bread and butter of all production companies of the day–there would have been no Canadian film industry without them.

ASN's CPR films were sponsored films, but its client list also included the major Canadian corporations of the day, including Eaton's, General Motors, Massey-Harris, the Canadian Wheat Board, Ford Motor Company, Bell Canada, all provincial governments and most Crown corporations. Many of these films were industrial and simply recorded the operation of a piece of machinery; a cameraman would be dispatched to shoot the product in action. But as audiences became more sophisticated, they found these films off-putting and producers were forced to make them more interesting.

Sparling began to turn commercial films into short dramas. He had a talent for manipulating information in such a way that the viewer received several different messages at once. He described these films as "simple, workman-like productions", but ASN's clients gave him a free hand, allowing him to experiment with new techniques. One example of this is Beautyrest, a 1931 film he made for the Simmons Bedding Company, in which he used heavy tinting and toning to turn the process of mattress manufacturing into a sort of fairy tale.

In 1932, for Weston Bread & Cakes, Sparling made The Breadwinner. It was meant to be a silent film, but Sparling added a music score and talking sequence. It is a dramatized commercial about a young man, his family, and healthy Weston bread. Sparling knew that family drama worked best, and this film was well-received. It was its positive reception that convinced Norrish to go with more dramatization in sponsored films. Shell then commissioned the 1934 film That's Shell Service. Sparling turned what was intended to be a simple training film into a 30-minute family drama, in which a young man is forced to leave university and a football career to turn home and run the family service station. Thanks to Shell, the station becomes successful, and the young man returns to university where his pretty girlfriend is waiting. The success of this film is what led to the production of House in Order.

In the post-Depression era, Canadian film production faltered. ASN continued to grow, remaining the largest private film production company in Canada. In 1938, the federal government hired Scottish filmmaker John Grierson to analyze the Canadian situation; Grierson's report led to the 1939 creation of the National Film Board of Canada (NFB) which, Grierson would say, was modeled on Norrish's example. With Grierson as commissioner of the NFB and Norrish as president of Associated Screen News, the Canadian industry had two very smart, very efficient men leading two extremely well-funded production companies.

When World War II broke out in 1939, sponsors wanted to show their contributions to the war effort. The focus of filmmaking shifted to propaganda films, military training films, and newsreels. Many ASN employees enlisted; some joined the Canadian Army Film and Photo Unit, as did Sparling, who took a leave of absence to become, as Major Sparling, the unit's director. While he was away, ASN continued to produce films, some as co-productions with the NFB.

== 1940s ==
In 1943, CPR head Edward Beatty died at the age of 66. Beatty was the last in a line of railroad tycoons who single-handedly controlled his empire and he relished his position as chairman of his film company's board. His successor, D'Alton Corry Coleman, was 64 and planning his retirement; overseeing a film studio was not one of his priorities. Former Famous Players president N.L. Nathanson who, as part of a distribution deal involving the 1924 share transfer of Associated Screen News, New York, became one of ASN's larger shareholders, offered to buy ASN—he had been expelled from Famous Players and, with heavy investment from The Rank Organisation, had founded Odeon Cinemas. Coleman declined the offer; he may not have been that interested in filmmaking, but ASN was making a lot of money.

In 1941, Norrish, who went by the name 'Ben', formed ASN's own distribution division, the Benograph Company, to distribute equipment and films. ASN had expanded its production of educational films; the Benograph Company distributed these, along with many of its industrial films, to schools throughout the country. When land next to the ASN lab became available, Norrish bought it so The Benograph Company could manufacture Bell & Howell filmmaking equipment. There was method to this; Norrish knew that The Rank Organisation saw Canada as a key point for competing in the American market, and that The Rank Organisation was already making Bell & Howell filmmaking equipment in the UK. Norrish was now 60 years old and Beatty was gone; he may have been setting up ASN, not to compete with The Rank Organisation, but to make it more attractive for Rank to purchase. N.L. Nathanson died in 1943 and Odeon had been taken over by his son Paul; before The Benograph Company could begin manufacturing for Bell & Howell, Paul Nathanson arranged a deal to import its equipment from the UK.

In 1944, Norrish opened a sales office in Toronto, and purchased the Vancouver photographic services company Dunne and Rundle. Then there was film printing; in 1945, the ASN lab work for The Rank Organisation was valued at $50,000.00; processing for American companies was $300,000.00. At the time, ASN was one of the few light industries which generated foreign currency.

In 1945, Norrish invested in 16 mm films. ASN was already using the format's smaller, lighter cameras for CPR productions and he assumed, correctly, that their sales would grow. By 1946, 16 mm projectors were common in every school and library in Canada, and Canadians were buying them for home use. Norrish started releasing ASN's films in both 35 mm and 16 mm; the latter were released in segments which people could watch in their living rooms, and the home market became a new and steady source of revenue.

In 1947, Paul Nathanson submitted an offer to buy ASN; the offer was too low, ASN was still highly profitable and his offer was declined.

When Sparling returned to ASN in 1946, he went back to producing Canadian Cameos. In 1934, he had made what is now his best-known short film, Rhapsody in Two Languages. This employed what he would call his "rhapsodic technique" which, through clever editing, was the juxtaposition of images and sounds to evoke activity and the passage of time. There was great demand for this technique, and Sparling used it as often as possible, notably in the 1942 film about Winston Churchill, The Thousand Days.

Canadian Cameos was officially revived with Canadian Headlines of 1948, a behind-the-scenes look at the moving production using the rhapsodic technique. With that film, Headlines of... became its own series, and ran until 1952. Theatre owners wanted more newsreels and Norrish noted that year-end compilations were popular in the U.S. Headlines of... went further, with Sparling stringing together the year's best footage with a plot, e.g. Canadian Headlines of 1950 centered around experimentation with the new invention of television.

But the popularity of Canadian Cameos was in decline. One reason for this is that both Norrish and Sparling were adamantly resistant to change of any kind; both believed that their tried-and-true methods would remain adequate and profitable, and Sparling continued with his formula. It is telling that, when the Canadian Film Awards were created in 1949, Canadian Cameos was awarded an Honourable Mention, while most of the other awards went to the NFB, and Crawley Films. Special attention was paid to the experimental films of Norman McLaren, and the Film of the Year was Budge Crawley's highly creative and technically masterful international hit The Loon's Necklace.

By 1946, Canada boasted a huge theatre-going public. There were thousands of amateur film clubs in every corner of the country, and young filmmakers were making films about every aspect of Canadian life for international distribution. Through the 1940s, film production in Canada doubled, but sponsored films were on the decline–through the post-war era, corporations did not have the funds to continuously commission advertising.

The Mapleville Story (1947) was the last dramatized commercial produced by ASN. This was a 23-minute film that stuck with Norrish's favourite message: that adversity could be overcome by hard work and thrift. It was commissioned by the Canadian Bankers Association to assure Canadians that the banking system was stable and their money was safe. But the client knew what Norrish and Sparling did not see; Canadian society had changed. The bankers knew that the public would not accept the film if they knew it was sponsored. So the client's name does not appear anywhere in the film; instead, ASN invented a name. The head credit reads "Produced by Canadian Film Features".

== 1950s ==
In 1949, Sparling began producing comedy. This was risky, as Canadians were not then known for producing humour; music hall shows almost always starred American or British comedians. He produced the comedic equestrian film All Joking Astride, and Borderline Cases, an amusing film about the quirks of communities on the US-Canada border; it won a Special Citation at the 2nd Canadian Film Awards. In 1950, Sitzmarks the Spot, featuring the Montreal comedian John Pratt, won a Special Award at the 3rd Canadian Film Awards for "an outstanding job in handling a comedy theme, a field in which few Canadians have excelled".

By now, Canadian producers were well into feature film production. Sparling wanted to produce features but, for all of its profitability, ASN could not follow, because it was still under the oversight of Canada's largest corporation; everything ASN did had to fall in line with the vision of the CPR. Also, with heavy competition from the Americans, Sparling and Norrish were not convinced that the types of films they could produce would be profitable.

In 1952, Alex McKie, an ASN employee, wrote a report detailing the viability of producing films for television. Norrish refused to consider the option of television until it was more developed. McKie quit and went to work for the CBC. Norrish dipped his toe into television by producing television commercials, but he and Sparling were resistant because television meant live productions and they didn't have the facilities or expertise for live productions.

In 1948, William Mather became head of the CPR; he was a 63 year-old business-minded engineer who could see that ASN was stagnating. In 1953, at the age of 68, Norrish retired; he died in 1961.

Mather, who knew little about the film industry and how to run a production company, named William Singleton ASN's new president. Singleton had been with ASN since 1926. He had worked in all of the company's departments, but his main role was as the driving force behind sales. He was replaced as VP Sales by Norman Hull, a cinematographer and director who had been with the firm since 1921; he was now the only person in the sales department. Sponsored films were gone. There was still some demand for newsreels, but sales of Canadian Cameos plummeted; its last episode, Spotlight No. 6, was released in November 1953.

The CPR was now heavily in debt, which it had been accumulating since the war. In 1955, Mather was replaced by Buck Crump, who had started with the CPR has a teen-age track labourer. He was now focused on making the CPR solely a transportation company; he did not want a film studio and did not allot any funds to ASN. Production facilities were not maintained, necessary equipment was not replaced and there was no investment in new technology. People started to leave, including Roy Tash. ASN employees went to either the NFB or the CBC; Tash freelanced for both before retiring in 1967. Sparling stayed with ASN.

In late 1953, when Paul Nathanson made another offer to buy ASN, Crump accepted it. In April 1954, the new ASN president was named: Nathanson's business partner, Maxwell Cummings, a real estate investor who owned apartment buildings and shopping malls in Montreal. His first act was to sell Benograph and its land holdings. The profits from the sale were not returned to ASN, but were paid as dividends to ASN's shareholders; ASN's largest shareholders were Paul Nathanson and Maxwell Cummings.

Next, Cummings hired Murray Briskin. Briskin was officially Cummings' executive assistant, but he was a New York producer who had just been with Music Corporation of America, or was possibly still in the employ of MCA. Briskin was hired to produce a television series which would then be sold to MCA. MCA assigned one of its New York writers, who developed a story based on the only Canadian company, it was felt, Americans would recognize, the Hudson's Bay Company. The new series would be about a young man who was an apprentice store manager for "The Bay". It would be called McLean of Hudson’s Bay and would ostensibly take place in Vancouver.

The Hudson's Bay thought this was a great idea and attached a special advisor to ASN. But Sparling was excluded; MCA sent an American director (name unknown) who angered everyone by his insistence on stereotypes. Sparling instructed Vancouver cinematographer Ross Beasley to shoot background footage; when it arrived, the director said it didn't look like Vancouver and commissioned painted backdrops. He said that Canadians couldn't act. He hired an American actor named Frank Mathias for the lead role, and black Montrealers to play Indians. Sparling and the Hudson's Bay were outraged when they saw that the reason for the "Indians" was that the plot of the pilot was about young McLean having to rescue a young white girl who had been kidnapped by Indians. The director persisted but the series went no further. ASN had wasted $40,000.00; it was the last production undertaken at Associated Screen Studios.

It did not have to be this way: CBC Television, which was formed in 1952, was desperate for programming. But Nathanson and Cummings wanted the bigger, faster profits of the American market. They were not interested in ASN's long-term potential, or in incurring any debt; it is unclear to what extent they may have been beholden to MCA.

In July 1957, Cummings shut down ASN's production and art departments. Sparling left and went to work for the NFB. Briskin told Canadian Film Weekly that ASN would continue to produce films by hiring freelancers but, by November, the company's sale was under way. In January 1958, ASN was sold to Du-Art Laboratories of New York, which wanted it for its laboratory and Quebec location. It re-named it Associated Screen Industries and used it to dub American features into French for European sales.

In 1967, Du-Art sold ASI to Bellevue-Humphries, a Canadian consortium which intended to establish film labs across Canada. When those plans were scrapped, ASI was sold to Pathé which, as Bellevue Pathé, operated the lab and grew the distribution side, acting for clients such as Walt Disney Studios. In 1973, Bellevue Pathé was purchased by Montreal's Astral Media which, in 2013, was purchased by Bell Media.

In 1954, at the 6th Canadian Film Awards, Gordon Sparling was presented with a Special Award "for distinguished service to the art of the film in Canada and to the Canadian film industry".

== Filmography (partial) ==
Below is a sampling of the films made by Associated Screen News. Over the course of its existence, the company created thousands of films. Records of many can be found at CESIF, Concordia University's Canadian Educational, Sponsored and Industrial Film Project. Records of another 2,000 are in the collection of the Canadian Government.

Kinograms Series
(Silent, black and white, 35 mm)

- Quebec, Old and New, 1921, Bernard Norrish director
- Old French Canada, 1921, John M. Alexander director
- Wild Westing De Luxe, 1921, Tracy Mathewson director
- Heap Busy Indians, 8 min., 1922, Bernard Norrish director
- The Land of Ancestral Gods, 1923, Bernard Norrish director
- Pidgin Land, 1923
- Shanghai Hangchow and Nanking, 1923, Bernard Norrish director
- Canada's Last West, 1924
- Trophies of a Screen Chase, 1924, Bernard Norrish director
- Sky Trails in the Bear Country, 1925, Bernard Norrish director
- Hook Line and Sinker, 1924, John M. Alexander director
- Forging the Links of Empire, 1924
- Lake of the Woods, 1924
- The Higher Life, 1925
- Climbing into Canada's Past, 1925
- The Fishing Parson, 1925, John M. Alexander director
- The Classic Nipigon, 1926
- The Happy Hunting Ground, 1926
- Rivers of Romance, 1927
- Saving the Sagas, 1927
- Skyland by Horse, 1928, J. Booth Scott director
- Fish and the Medicine Men, 1928
- Cabin Camps in Skyland, 1928
- Alaska, 1927, John M. Alexander director
- Half the World, 1928
- Tadoussac, 1928, Bernard Norrish director
- Yukon, 1928, John M. Alexander director
- They're Biting Good, 1928, Roy Tash, director
- Niagara, 1929, Roy Tash, director
- The Beautiful Nipigon, 1929

Canadian Cameo Series
(Black and white, with sound, 35 mm)
All produced by Bernard Norrish and directed by Gordon Sparling

- Pathfinder, 11 min., 1930 silent, 1932 with sound
- Progress on Parade, 1932
- Back in '22, 11 min., 1932
- Shadow River, 8 min., 1933
- Breezing Along, 1933, James W. Campbell director
- Hockey Champions, 12 min., 1933
- Fair and Cold, 1933
- Did You Know That?, in editions 1934-1943
- Angles on Angling, 20 min., 1934
- Grey Owl's Strange Guests, 11 min., 1934, Gordon Sparling and Alfred Nicholson directors
- Rhapsody in Two Languages, 1934
- Kingdom for a Horse (Au Royaume du Cheval), 1935
- Hot and Happy, 11 min., 1935
- City of Towers, 10 min., 1935
- Point of Honour, 10 min., 1936
- Crystal Ballet, 1936
- Fencer's Art, 1936
- Picking Locks (Les Grandes écluses), 10 min., 1937
- Ornamental Swimming (Natation de fantaisie), 1937
- Music from the Stars, 11 min., 1937
- Royal Banners Over Ottawa, 12 min., 1939
- Sky Fishing (La Pêche dans les nuages), 10 min., 1940
- Canadian Headlines of 1946, (annual 1946-1952)
- Borderline Cases, 11 min., 1949
- All about Emily, 10 min., 1949, for CBS Stage 46
- Making Mounties, 10 min., 1950
- All Joking Astride, 11 min., 1950
- Cowboy's Holiday, 10 min., 1950, in colour
- The Fruitful Earth, 1951, in colour
- The Great Divide, 1951, in colour
- Spotlight No. 2, 11 min., 1951
- Canine Crimebusters, 11 min., 1952
- The Roaring Game, 1952
- Circus on Ice, 1955, in colour

Canadian Pacific Railway Films

- New Homes Within the Empire, 1922
- Making New Canadians, 1925
- Canada's Capital on Skis, 1925
- Fish and Medicine Men, 1928
- Across Canada by CPR, 1928
- Locomotive 8000, 1931
- Hiking on Top of the World, 1935, Norman Hull director
- From Sea to Sea, 1936, John E. R. McDougall
- Ski-Time in the Rockies, 1937, John E. R. McDougall director
- Ski Trails of New France, 1938
- Canadian Rockies Holiday, 1938
- Alaska and the Yukon, 1939
- The Radiant Rockies, 1940
- Royal Banners Over Ottawa, 1940, colour
- Down by the Sea, 1940, Roy Tash director
- Land of the Ski-Hawk, 1945, Philip Ross Pitt-Taylor director
- Canada's Tackle Busters, 1946, Earl Clark director
- Summer in Old Quebec, 1946, John M. Alexander director
- From Coast to Coast, 1947, Norman Hull director
- The Shining Mountains, 1948, Roy Tash director
- Happy Voyage, 1948, Earl Clark director
- West Coast Playground, 1948, Earl Clark director
- Across Canada (Paisajes Canadienses), 1949
- Klondike Holiday, for the CPR and White Pass and Yukon Railway 1950 - Earl Clark director
- Jackpine Journey, 1950, Earl Clark director
- Snowtime Holiday, 1951
- Banff's Golf Challenge, 1952, Ross Beesley director
- Canadian Pattern (Mosaïque canadienne), 1952, Earl Clark director
- High Powder, 1953

Sponsored Films

- A Party on the Roof of the World, 1922
- American Success in Canadian Farming, 1928
- A New Yorker's Canadian Weekend, 1928
- Kawartha Muskys, 1928
- Achievement: the Story of a Store, for T. Eaton Co. 1929, John M. Alexander director
- Petroleum: Alberta's Newest Industry, 1929
- A River of Earnings, 1930
- Clean-Up Week in Montreal, for the City Improvement League 1930
- Miracle at Beauharnois, for Beauharnois Construction Co. 1931, Gordon Sparling director
- A.S.N. Picture, 1932
- Last Minute Clothing News, T. Eaton Co. 1933
- Ale and Artie, 1935, Gordon Sparling director
- The Kinsmen, for the Canadian Wheat Board, released in Britain as Prairie Gold, 1937
- The Royal Visit, 1939, co-produced with the Canadian Government Motion Picture Bureau, Frank Badgley producer and director
- Time Out for Eats, for Burns Company (Calgary) 1940
- Peoples of Canada (Peuples du Canada, Det Kanadiske Folk), Canada Carries On Series, for the National Film Board of Canada 1940, Stuart Legg producer, Gordon Sparling director
- Happy Valley, for the Government of Nova Scotia 1940, Tom Courtney director
- Skiways (1940, colour)
- All for Canada : A Story of TCA in the War, for Trans-Canada Air Lines 1943
- The Hands Are Sure, for Alcan 1943, Philip Ross Pitt-Taylor director
- What Came First, for Burns Company (Calgary) c 1944, Jack W. Pechet director
- Upon This Day, 1945
- Pattern in Efficiency, for the Royal Canadian Air Force and IBM 1945, Jack Chisholm director
- All Clear, for Cusson Brothers 1945
- Along Pioneer Trails, for Burns Company (Calgary) c 1945, Jack W. Pechet director
- Bluebloods from Canada (Les Purs sangs du Canada) 1948, Michael Spencer producer
- Highlights from the Parliamentary Life of the Right Honourable William Lyon Mackenzie King, 1948
- Achievement - A Story of the Manufacture of Stainless and Specialty Alloy Steels, for Atlas Steels 1950, Jack Chisholm director
- The 1950 Stanley Cup, for the National Hockey League 1950
- Three for Health, Associated Milk Foundations 1950
- No Man Is an Island, for the Consolidated Mining and Smelting Co. of Canada 1950, director Robert J. Martin
- Neighbours in Enterprise, 1950, Robert J. Martin director
- Ahoy Subway Cars, for the Toronto Transit Commission 1954
- 100,000 chevaux sous le Saint-Laurent (Beneath the Wide St. Lawrence), for Hydro-Québec 1955, John E. R. McDougall director
- A Nation in Touch, for Trans Canada Telephone 1955, Ray Cunningham and Ernest Reid directors
- An Adventure in Automation (L'Aventure de l'automatisation), co-produced with Gordon Rice Studios for Standard-Modern Tool Co. 1956
- Montréal, for City of Montreal, 1959, Jack Alexander director
