= Murder Is News =

1937 film

- Directed by: Leon Barsha
- Written by: Edgar Edwards (writer)
- Produced by: Kenneth J. Bishop (producer)
- Starring: See below
- Cinematography: George Meehan
- Edited by: William Austin
- Production companies: Central Films; Kenneth J. Bishop Productions
- Distributed by: Columbia Pictures
- Release date: March 1, 1939 (U.S.)
- Running time: 55 minutes
- Countries: Canada; United States
- Language: English

Murder Is News is a 1937 Canadian-American mystery film directed by Leon Barsha. The film is one of four Quota Quickies directed by Leon Barsha for the British market in Victoria, B.C., during the summer and fall of 1937.

== Plot ==
A rich businessman is murdered at his townhouse the night his wife plans to divorce him and marry a high-powered lawyer.

== Cast ==
- John Gallaudet as Jerry Tracy
- Iris Meredith as Ann Leslie
- George McKay as Brains McGillicuddy
- John Hamilton as David Corning
- Frank C. Wilson as Tony Peyden
- William McIntyre as Edgar Drake
- Doris Lloyd as Pauline Drake
- John Graham Spacey as Fred Hammer
- Colin Kenny as Insp. Fitzgerald
- Fred Baes as R.A. Snyder
