= John Gallaudet =

American actor (1903–1983)

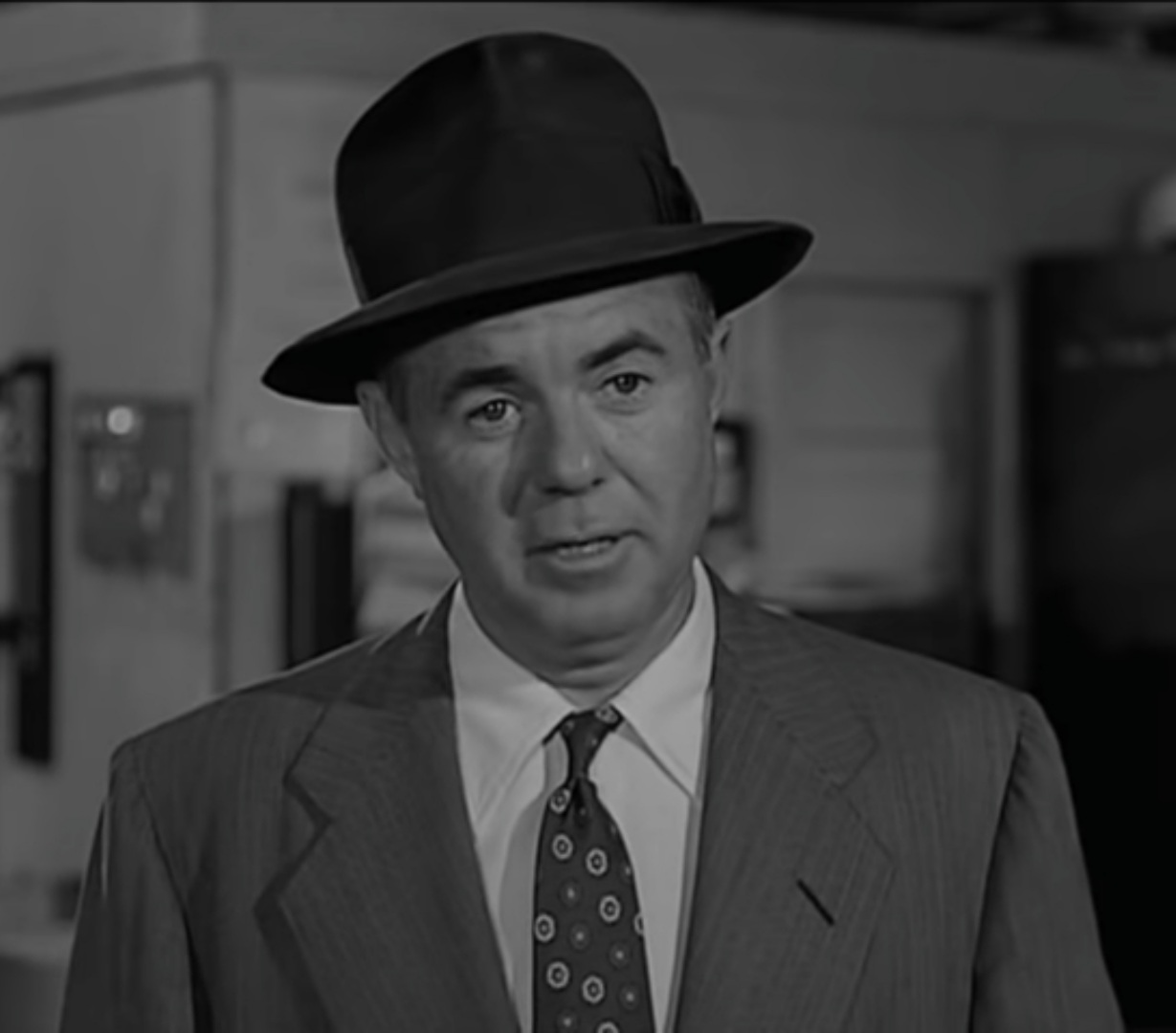
- Gallaudet in Quicksand (1950)
- Born: John Beury Gallaudet; August 23, 1903; Philadelphia, Pennsylvania, U.S.
- Died: November 5, 1983 (aged 80); Los Angeles, California, U.S.
- Other name: John Beury Gallaudet
- Education: Williams College
- Occupation: Actor
- Years active: 1925–1974
- Spouse(s): Wynne Gibson (m. 1927; div. 1930) Constance Helen MacKenzie (m. 1932)
- Children: 3

John Beury Gallaudet (August 23, 1903 – November 5, 1983) was an American film and television actor.

== Career ==
Gallaudet was born in Philadelphia and attended Williams College. He began his theatrical career on stage, appearing on Broadway in When You Smile (1925), Don Q., Jr. (1926), On the Spot (1930), The Gang's All Here (1931), Here Goes the Bride (1931), Lost Horizons (1934), and Good Men and True (1935).

In 1936, Gallaudet was signed by Columbia Pictures as a character player. For the next three years he appeared in more than 30 Columbia features, usually playing newspapermen, radio broadcasters, or one of the hero's associates on either side of the law. His Columbia credit most familiar to today's audiences is the Bing Crosby musical Pennies from Heaven (1936); Gallaudet plays a condemned convict who, unable to deliver a vital message himself, entrusts Crosby with it just before his execution.

In the late 1930s, Columbia had to comply with the Cinematograph Films Act of 1927, which decreed that American studios could release their films in Canada only if they agreed to distribute Canadian-made films in return. Columbia sent many of its contract actors and crew members to Canada, where films were made in Canadian studios while Columbia supervised the quality control. John Gallaudet made the trek to Canada, where for the only time in his screen career he received starring roles. He played crime-busting reporter Jerry Tracey in the action-adventure films Manhattan Shakedown and Murder Is News (both 1937). Columbia didn't release Murder Is News until 1939, and Variety promptly complained about the small-studio production values: "Production skimps on sets, lighting, and other technical details that might have helped to lift it out of the 'C' class." Showmen's Trade Review gave John Gallaudet the benefit of the doubt: "Gallaudet does his best to be what a columnist should, but reporters may be mystified at the interpretation."

Gallaudet left Columbia in 1938 to begin a busy freelance career, working for Universal Pictures, RKO Radio Pictures, Warner Bros., Paramount Pictures, and Metro-Goldwyn-Mayer. After World War II, when the major studios decided to make fewer but more expensive pictures, many actors found themselves underemployed, John Gallaudet among them. He began accepting assignments for minor-league companies like Monogram Pictures and Eagle-Lion Films, in addition to his major-studio work.

Gallaudet became a familiar face on television, appearing in such popular programs as Dragnet, World of Giants, Johnny Midnight, and The George Burns and Gracie Allen Show. In the 1959 TV Western Bat Masterson, he played General William Tecumseh Sherman, whose life was in danger while visiting Dodge City. Gallaudet became one of the resident judges on the Perry Mason series, and was one of the few jurists to be identified by name ("Judge Ben Penner"). He continued to work in motion pictures and television through 1974, notably in the 1967 feature In Cold Blood.

== Personal life and death ==
John Gallaudet had worked on stage with actress Wynne Gibson in the 1925 show When You Smile; they were married from 1927 to 1930. Gallaudet married Constance Helen MacKenzie in 1932. They remained married until his death on November 5, 1983, in Los Angeles, at the age of 80.

== Selected filmography ==
- Counterfeit (1936) as Pete Dailey
- Adventure in Manhattan (1936) as McGuire
- Come Closer, Folks (1936) as Pitchman
- Shakedown (1936) as Hawsley
- Pennies from Heaven (1936) as J. C. Hart
- Devil's Playground (1937) as Jones
- Racketeers in Exile (1937) as Happy
- Speed to Spare (1937) as Dan Kelly
- Manhattan Shakedown (1937, leading role) as Jerry Tracey
- Murder Is News (1937, released 1939; leading role) as Jerry Tracey
- The Main Event (1938) as Joe Carter
- One Hour to Live (1939) as Jimmy March
- No Greater Sin (1941) as Townsend
- Gang Busters (1942, serial) as Wilkinson
- Shadows Over Chinatown (1946) as Jeff Hay, detective
- Louisiana (1947) as Charlie Mitchell
- Stage Struck (1948) as Benny Nordick
- Docks of New Orleans (1948) as Captain Pete McNalley
- Missing Women (1951) as Detective Kelleher
- The Caddy (1953) as Jonathan Bell
- Double Jeopardy (1955) as Police Lieutenant Freid
- No Man's Woman (1955) as Detective Sergeant Wells
- Terror at Midnight (1956) as George Flynn
- A Private's Affair (1959) as Surgeon General (uncredited)
- Go Naked in the World (1961) as Rupert - Vice Squad Detective (uncredited)
- The Patsy (1964) as Barney (uncredited)
- In Cold Blood (1967) as Roy Church
- The Happy Ending (1969) as Airplane Passenger (uncredited)

== Selected television credits ==
- Alfred Hitchcock Presents (1955) (Season 1 Episode 1: "Revenge") as Doctor
- Perry Mason (1959-1966) - 20 episodes as Judge Ben Penner / Judge
- Leave It to Beaver (2/11/1961) (Season 4, Episode 20: "Beaver’s Tonsils") as Dr. Kirby
- Leave It to Beaver (2/14/1963) (Season 6 Episode 21: "Beaver the Caddy") as Arthur Howard
- Adam-12 (1970) (Season 3 Episode 9: "Log 25: Indians") as Charley
- Adam-12 (1972) (Season 4 Episode 14: "Citizens All") as Jason Walters
- Adam-12 (1973) (Season 5 Episode 17: "The Beast") as Ralph Peterson
- Adam-12 (01/29/1974) (Season 6 Episode 17: "Taking It Easy") as Old Man

== Bibliography ==
- Pitts, Michael R. Western Movies: A Guide to 5,105 Feature Films. McFarland, 2012.
