= Blackmailer (1936 film) =

1936 film by Gordon Wiles

- Directed by: Gordon Wiles
- Written by: Harold Buchman; Joseph Krumgold; Lee Loeb
- Starring: William Gargan; Florence Rice; H.B. Warner
- Cinematography: Allen G. Siegler
- Edited by: Al Clark
- Production company: Columbia Pictures
- Distributed by: Columbia Pictures
- Release date: May 8, 1936
- Running time: 66 minutes
- Country: United States
- Language: English

Blackmailer is a 1936 American comedy mystery film directed by Gordon Wiles and starring William Gargan, Florence Rice, and H.B. Warner. It was produced and distributed by Columbia Pictures.

Variety also reported that exhibitors were advised to ignore the pressbook and sell the film as a farce.

== Plot ==
An incompetent police inspector and an equally foolish private detective both become involved in a blackmail case.

== Cast ==
- William Gargan as Peter Cornish
- Florence Rice as Joan Rankin
- H.B. Warner as Michael Rankin
- Nana Bryant as Mrs. Lindsay
- Wyrley Birch as Nelson
- Drue Leyton as Lydia Rankin
- Paul Hurst as Inspector Killian
- Kenneth Thomson as Mr. Porter
- Boyd Irwin as Dr. Lindsay
- Alexander Cross as Jack Donovan
- Herman Bing as Dr. Rosenkrantz - Coroner

== Release ==
Blackmailer was released on May 8, 1936.

== Bibliography ==
- Langman, Larry; Finn, Daniel (1995). A Guide to American Crime Films of the Thirties. Greenwood Press.
