= Charles Quigley =

American actor

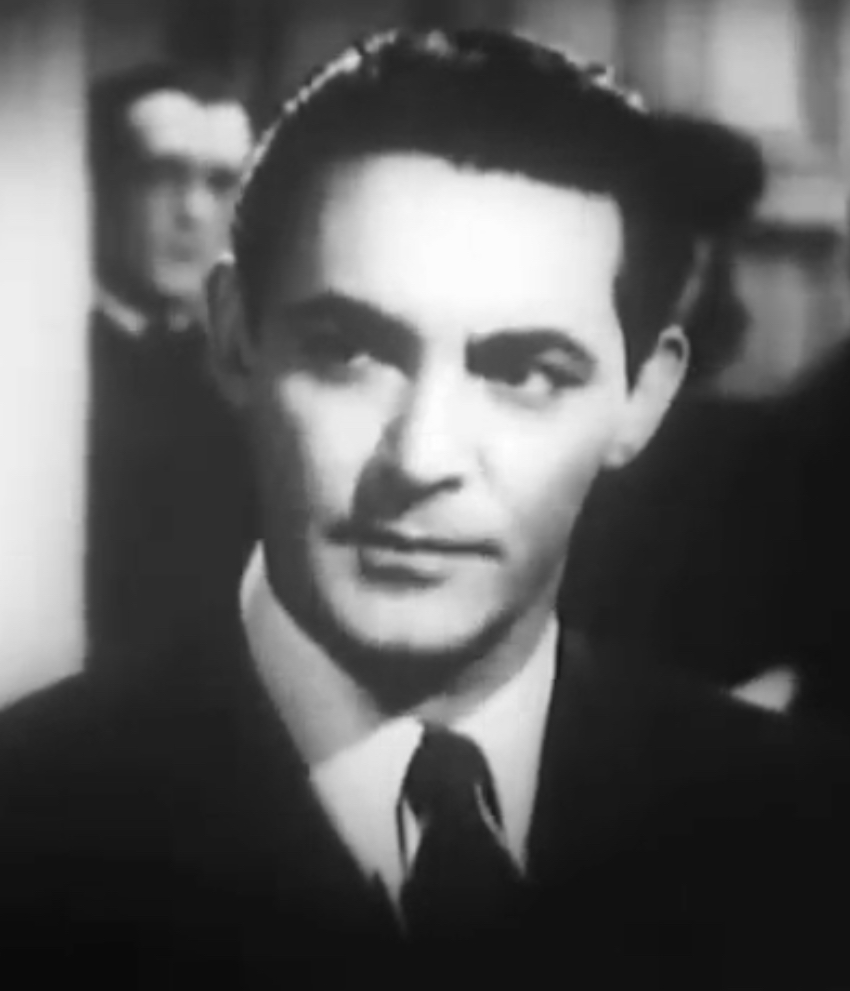
- Quigley in Secret Evidence (1941)
- Born: February 12, 1906
- Died: August 5, 1964 (aged 58); Los Angeles, California, U.S.
- Occupation: Actor
- Years active: 1931–1959
- Spouse: Harriet Blue (m. 1928)
- Children: 1

Charles Quigley (February 12, 1906 – August 5, 1964) was an American actor.

== Early years ==
Quigley was the son of Charles P. Quigley, who was a sales manager for a hardware business. He was a 1924 graduate of New Britain High School, and he attended the Academy of Dramatic Arts in New York.

== Career ==
On stage, Quigley acted for a year with a stock theater company in Portland, Maine, after which he worked with a touring company of Expressing Willie. He portrayed Christian for a year in a production of Cyrano de Bergerac and then was Ethel Barrymore's leading man for two years.

In Hollywood, Quigley starred in many serials and movies. He appeared opposite Rita Hayworth in several films including Convicted, Special Inspector, Girls Can Play and The Shadow, as well as in A Woman's Face with Joan Crawford. He also starred in The Crimson Ghost and appeared in the serial version of Superman (1948). His last performance was in Tokyo After Dark (1959).

On Broadway, Quigley appeared in False Dreams, Farewell (1934), The World Waits (1933), Her Tin Soldier (1933), Scarlet Sister Mary (1930), Diana (1929), The Bonds of Interest (1929), Cyrano de Bergerac (1928), Caponsacchi (1928), The Light of Asia (1928), and Arabian Nightmare (1927).

Quigley appeared on television a few times in the 1950s.

== Personal life ==
In 1928, Quigley married Harriet Blue. They had a son.

== Death ==
On August 5, 1964, Quigley died in Los Angeles at age 58.

== Filmography ==
- 1931: Prestige - Party Guest (uncredited)
- 1932: The Saddle Buster - Cladgett - Ranch Hand
- 1936: Broken Hearts
- 1936: King of Burlesque - Stanley Drake
- 1936: Charlie Chan's Secret - Dick Williams
- 1936: And Sudden Death - Mike Andrews
- 1936: Lady from Nowhere - Earl Daniels
- 1937: Find the Witness - Larry McGill
- 1937: Criminals of the Air - Mark Owens
- 1937: Speed to Spare - Tommy Morton
- 1937: Girls Can Play - Jimmy Jones
- 1937: The Game That Kills - Alex Ferguson
- 1937: The Shadow - Jim Quinn
- 1938: Special Inspector - Tom Evans
- 1938: Convicted - Burns, Police Detective
- 1939: Daredevils of the Red Circle - Gene Townley
- 1939: Heroes in Blue - Joe Murphy
- 1940: Men Against the Sky - Flynn
- 1940: Mexican Spitfire Out West - Mr. Roberts
- 1940: Kitty Foyle - Bill - Office Worker (uncredited)
- 1941: The Saint in Palm Springs - Mr. Fletcher (uncredited)
- 1941: Play Girl - Lock (uncredited)
- 1941: Secret Evidence - David Harrison
- 1941: Footlight Fever - Spike
- 1941: They Met in Argentina - Reporter (uncredited)
- 1941: A Woman's Face - Eric
- 1941: The Iron Claw (Serial) - Bob Lane
- 1942: Yokel Boy - Richards, Actor Policeman (uncredited)
- 1943: Freedom Comes High (Short) - Jacobs
- 1944: I Love a Soldier - Soldier (uncredited)
- 1944: National Barn Dance - Johnny Burke
- 1944: Practically Yours - George Macy (uncredited)
- 1945: Duffy's Tavern - Ronald
- 1946: Larceny in Her Heart - Arch Dubler
- 1946: The Crimson Ghost (Serial) - Duncan Richards
- 1946: Affairs of Geraldine - J. Edmund Roberts
- 1946: That Brennan Girl - Detective (uncredited)
- 1947: Three on a Ticket - Kurt Leroy
- 1947: Danger Street - Carl Pauling
- 1947: Brick Bradford (Serial) - Laydron
- 1948: Bob and Sally - John Wright
- 1948: Superman (Serial) - Hackett [Chs. 6-15]
- 1949: The Cowboy and the Indians - Henderson (uncredited)
- 1950: Unmasked - Newcombe - Police Detective
- 1950: David Harding, Counterspy - Grady (uncredited)
- 1950: Pirates of the High Seas (Serial) - Merkel - Nightclub Manager [Ch.1] (uncredited)
- 1959: Tokyo After Dark - General (uncredited) (final film role)
