= Leon Barsha =

American film producer

- Born: December 26, 1905; Brooklyn, New York, United States
- Died: November 13, 1964 (aged 58); Hollywood, Los Angeles, California, United States
- Occupations: Film producer, film editor, film director

Leon Barsha (December 26, 1905 – November 13, 1964) was an American film producer, editor and director. As a producer and director he was best known for making films in the Western genre. In his later years he concentrated especially on editing.

== Personal ==
Barsha was born in Manhattan, New York in 1905. He was married to Helen Barsha. They had a son, Tony, who became a playwright. Granddaughter Lili Barsha is an actor and writer.

The North Hollywood home of the Barshas was designed by the architect Richard Neutra in 1937. The house has been restored twice and moved at least once, changing owners several times.

He died in California on November 13, 1964.

== Filmography ==
=== As producer ===
- The Taming of the West (1939)
- Prairie Schooners (1940)
- The Wildcat of Tucson (1940)
- Beyond the Sacramento (1940)
- Roaring Frontiers (1941)
- Hands Across the Rockies (1941)
- Bullets for Bandits (1942)
- The Devil's Trail (1942)

=== As editor ===
- Broadway Scandals (1929)
- Sudden Fear (1952)
- A Bullet for Joey (1955)
- Walk the Dark Street (1956)
- Lizzie (1957)
- The Twilight Zone (1960-1961) - 11 Episodes
- Gunsmoke (1961)
- Lonely Are the Brave (1962)
- Lady in a Cage (1964)
- Rawhide (1964) - 5 Episodes

=== As director ===
- Murder is News (1937)
- Two-Fisted Sheriff (1937)
- Trapped (1937)
- Two Gun Law (1937)
- Manhattan Shakedown (1937)
- One Man Justice (1937)
- Convicted (1938)
- Special Inspector (1938)
- Who Killed Gail Preston? (1938)
- Manhattan Shakedown (1939)
- The Pace That Thrills (1952)
