= George McKay (actor) =

Russian-American actor (1884–1945)

- Born: 15 April 1884; Minsk, Russian Empire
- Died: 3 December 1945 (aged 61); Hollywood, US
- Occupation: Actor
- Years active: 1929–1946

George McKay (15 April 1884 – 3 December 1945) was a Russian-American actor. He appeared in more than one hundred films from 1929 to 1946.

Salt Lake City was McKay's hometown, and he earned money as a boy by doing handsprings on the street, then passing a hat. He took a job with a circus after its manager saw his street performance. After the circus proved unsatisfactory, he began singing in dance halls in Hot Springs. Following that, he teamed with Johnny Cantwell in an act that lasted 14 years, touring the world in addition to their engagements in American venues. He married dancer Ottie Ardine, and they formed a team that played in vaudeville.

== Selected filmography ==
Year	Title	Role	Notes
1935	Case of the Missing Man	Frank Nelson	
1935	Too Tough to Kill	Nick Pollack	
1935	Super Speed	George Stone	
1936	The Final Hour	Charlie	
1936	Come Closer, Folks	Rudolph	
1936	Counterfeit Lady	Pinky	
1936	You May Be Next	Mitch Cook	
1936	Pride of the Marines	Mac McCabe	
1936	Two-Fisted Gentleman	Schmidty	
1936	Killer at Large	Sergeant Kelly	
1936	Shakedown	Spud	
1937	Racketeers in Exile	'Horseface'	
1937	Manhattan Shakedown	Brains	
1937	Murder Is News	Brains McGillicuddy	
1937	Murder in Greenwich Village	Officer	
1937	The Frame-Up	Joe Lavery	
1937	It's All Yours	License Clerk	
1938	Special Inspector	Silver	
1938	Squadron of Honor	Todd	
1940	The Secret Seven	Golden	
1941	Harvard, Here I Come	Blinky	
1941	Caught in the Act	Police detective	
1943	She Has What It Takes	Mike McManus	
1945	Ten Cents a Dance	Bits	
