= Rhapsody in Two Languages =

1934 Canadian documentary film

- Directed by: Gordon Sparling
- Written by: Gordon Sparling
- Produced by: Bernard Norrish
- Narrated by: Corey Thomson
- Cinematography: Alfred Jacquemin
- Edited by: Gordon Sparling
- Music by: Howard Fogg
- Production company: Associated Screen News of Canada
- Release date: April 21, 1934
- Running time: 10 minutes
- Country: Canada
- Language: English

Rhapsody in Two Languages is a Canadian short documentary film, directed by Gordon Sparling and released in 1934. The most famous film in the Canadian Cameo Series of short documentaries, the film is a portrait of life in the bilingual and bicultural city of Montreal during the Great Depression era.

Considered a city symphony film, it is set predominantly to a musical score by composer Howard Fogg, although it features small snippets of narration by Corey Thomson.

== Content and main themes ==
Following the introduction to the film, the opening sequence of milk receival parallels the ending as it brings viewers through a full day in Montreal. The film starts off showing a typical morning routine of waking up, getting dressed, and preparing breakfast. Following this, a montage depicts the rush of commuting to work. This portion is accompanied with scenes that describe the motivations of going to work and explores the context of such motivation in terms of working amongst others. This leads into the climax of the piece where the daily components of the stock market and work day are shown. As the piece moves on from the climax, the scene changes to focus on the constant moving of people into and out of the city. Then finally to end the piece, the night of Montreal comes to life as people are shown enjoying drinks, dance, and music.

== Historical context ==
The film premiered on April 21, 1934, at the Palace Theatre in Montreal. Contrary to the period that the piece is set in, never once in the storyline is there an indication of the negative impacts of the Great Depression. This is due to the intended purpose of a lighthearted and enjoyable watching experience for the Canadian Cameo Series. However, the film does in some ways indirectly show a sense of urgency for the situation. For instance, the dilemma of an increasing population size in the context of an era of financial instability.

== Reception ==
The film was received positively in Canada, indicating a representative portrayal. The film was selected for inclusion in Canada On Screen, the Toronto International Film Festival's special retrospective program on the history of Canadian cinema which was staged in 2017 as part of Canada 150. Interestingly, the intended audience of Rhapsody in Two Languages was middle-class Canadians and foreigners. This is supported by the fact that there is a lack of French dubbing of the films in the series even though French-Canadians are included as characters. When French versions were made, they were not made with the intention of better representation, but rather for the purposes of commercial success. At the time, this poor French representation was accepted because of the general Canadian attitude towards them.
