= John Steele, Adventurer =

- Taken from the files of John Steele, Adventurer!
- Genre: Adventure fiction
- Running time: 30 minutes
- Country of origin: USA
- Language(s): English
- TV adaptations: Mutual Broadcasting System
- Hosted by: Ted Maille
- Starring: Don Douglas
- Directed by: Elliot Drake
- Original release: 1949 – 1956

John Steele, Adventurer was a radio drama during the end the Golden Age of Radio. It was reminiscent of the action magazines of the time such as All-Story and Argosy.

== Premise ==
John Steele was a roving adventurer who held various jobs in exotic locations. The stories were narrated by a friend of Steele's, with Steele making cameo appearances throughout.

Episodes tended to focus more on people Steele met than on Steele himself. Topics included romantic comedy, high-seas adventures, sports, and mysteries.

== Production ==
John Steele, Adventurer debuted on the Mutual Broadcasting System on April 26, 1949, as a component of "Tuesday Night is Mystery Night on Mutual". Don Douglas portrayed Steele, while Robert Monroe wrote and directed the series. Other actors heard on the program included John Larkin, Bryna Raeburn, and Jack Edwards. Music was by Sylvan Levin and Doc Whipple. Writers included Elliot Drake.
