= Gordon Sparling =

Canadian filmmaker (1900–1994)

Gordon Sparling (1900–1994) was a pioneering Canadian filmmaker. He was educated at Trinity College in the University of Toronto. He directed such early Canadian films as Rhapsody in Two Languages in 1934, The Tidy House (La maison en ordre) in 1936 and The Kinsmen in 1938. Along with such films, Sparling directed film shorts as Pleasure Island (1936) that promoted Canada's largest and most luxurious summer resort, Bigwin Inn, on Bigwin Island, Ontario.

Gordon Sparling's start with the Ontario Motion Picture Bureau in 1924, led to a 40-year career with the Canadian Government Motion Picture Bureau and Associated Screen News of Canada (ASN). He worked as an assistant director on Carry on, Sergeant! in 1928 and during the 1930s was virtually the only creative filmmaker in the Canadian commercial film industry. He launched the Canadian Cameo series of theatrical shorts at ASN in 1932 and continued to direct and produce the series until 1955. During the Second World War, he was the head of the Canadian Army Film and Photo Unit, producing and directing propaganda films. He returned to ASN and remained with the studio until the production department was closed down in 1957.

== See also ==
- List of Canadian films
