= Special Inspector =

1938 film by Leon Barsha

- Original lobby card
- Directed by: Leon Barsha
- Screenplay by: Edgar Edwards
- Produced by: Kenneth J. Bishop
- Starring: Charles Quigley; Rita Hayworth; George McKay
- Cinematography: George Meehan
- Edited by: William Austin
- Production company: Kenneth J. Bishop Productions
- Distributed by: Columbia Pictures
- Release date: 1938
- Running time: 65 minutes
- Country: United States
- Language: English

Special Inspector, also known as Across the Border, is a 1938 Canadian/American international coproduction crime film directed by Leon Barsha. It stars Charles Quigley, Rita Hayworth and George McKay. This was Hayworth's second Canadian film for Columbia Pictures shot in Victoria, B.C.

== Plot ==
U.S. Customs Service special inspector Tom Evans works with the British Columbia Provincial Police on an assignment to capture a gang smuggling furs from Canada into the United States.

== Cast ==
- Charles Quigley as Tom Evans
- Rita Hayworth as Patricia Lane
- George McKay as Silver
- Edgar Edwards as Bill
- John Graham Spacey as David Foster
- Eddie Laughton as Tim posing as David Foster
- Bob Rideout as Dapper
