= List of American films of 1937 =

American films released in 1937

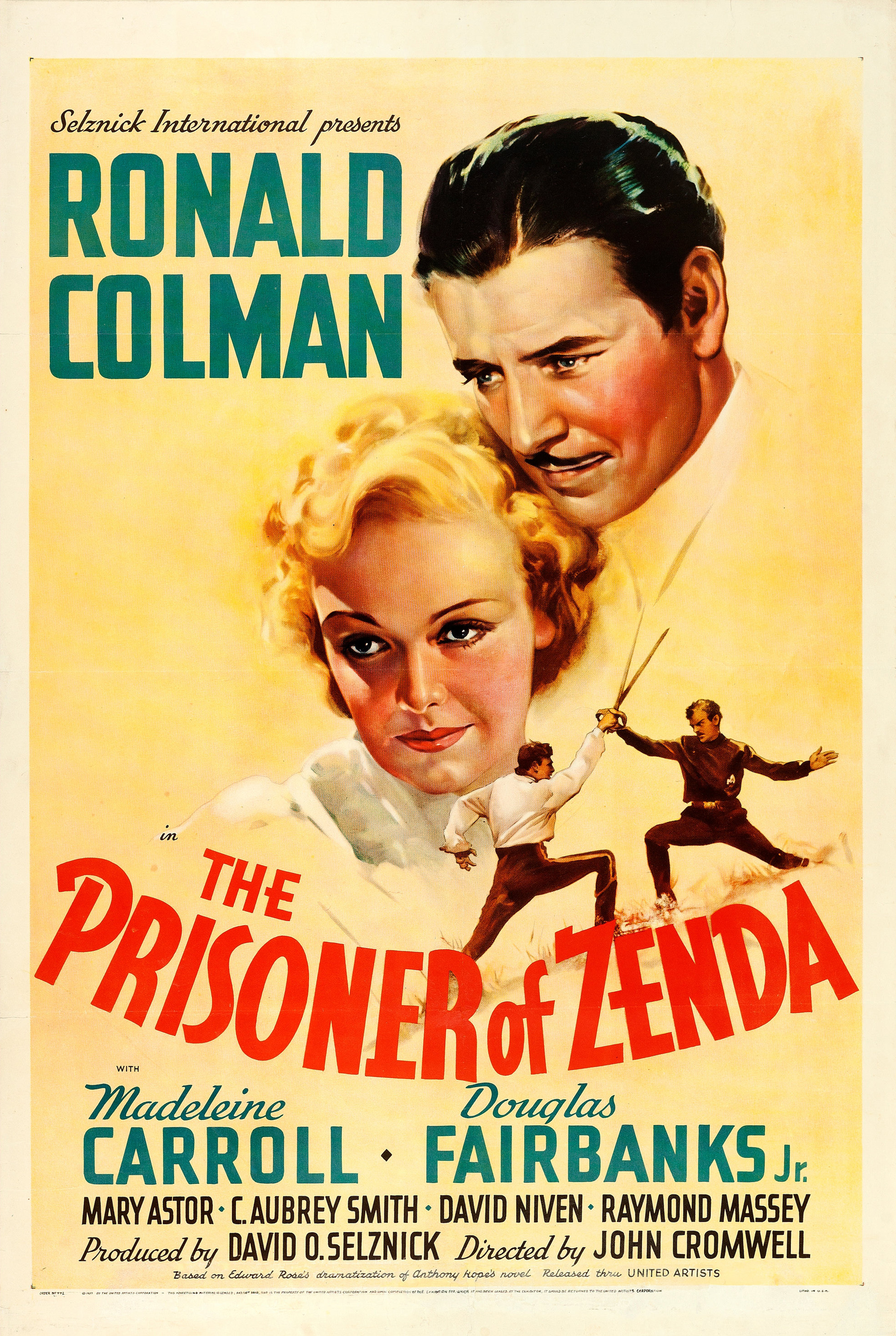
The Prisoner of Zenda starring Ronald Colman and Madeleine Carroll.

More than 540 American feature-length motion pictures were released in 1937.

The 10th Academy Awards, hosted by Bob Burns, were presented on March 10, 1938 at the Los Angeles Biltmore Hotel. There were ten nominees for Best Picture: The Awful Truth (also director [win], actress and supporting actor), Captains Courageous (also actor [win]), Dead End (also supporting actress), The Good Earth (also director and actress [win]), In Old Chicago (also supporting actress [win]), Lost Horizon (also supporting actor), One Hundred Men and a Girl, Stage Door (also director and supporting actress), A Star Is Born (also director, actor and actress) and the winner, The Life of Emile Zola (also director, actor and supporting actor [win]).

Additional films with acting nominations: Camille (actress), Conquest (actor), The Hurricane (supporting actor), Night Must Fall (actor and supporting actress), Stella Dallas (actress and supporting actress), Topper (supporting actor).

Films listed by number of nominations in all categories: The Life of Emile Zola (10 [3 wins]), A Star Is Born (7 [1 win and 1 non-competitive win]), Lost Horizon (7 [2 wins]), In Old Chicago (6 [2 wins]), The Awful Truth (6 [1 win]), The Good Earth (5 [2 wins]), One Hundred Men and a Girl (5 [1 win]), Captains Courageous (4 [1 win]), Stage Door (4), Dead End (4), The Hurricane (3 [1 win]), Conquest (2), Night Must Fall (2), Stella Dallas (2), Topper (2), Camille (1).

Additional films with nominations: Souls at Sea (3), A Damsel in Distress (2), Maytime (2), The Prisoner of Zenda (2), Walter Wanger's Vogues of 1938 (2), Waikiki Wedding (2), Black Legion (1), Wings over Honolulu (1).

== A–B ==
Title	Director	Cast	Genre	Notes
The 13th Man	William Nigh	Weldon Heyburn, Milburn Stone, Robert Homans	Mystery	Monogram
23 1/2 Hours Leave	John G. Blystone	James Ellison, Terry Walker, Arthur Lake	Comedy	Grand National
45 Fathers	James Tinling	Jane Withers, Richard Carle, Hattie McDaniel	Comedy	20th Century Fox
52nd Street	Harold Young	Dorothy Peterson, Kenny Baker, ZaSu Pitts	Musical comedy	United Artists
Adventure's End	Arthur Lubin	John Wayne, Diana Gibson, Montagu Love	Adventure	Universal
The Adventurous Blonde	Frank McDonald	Glenda Farrell, Barton MacLane, Anne Nagel	Comedy/Mystery	Warner Bros.
Affairs of Cappy Ricks	Ralph Staub	Walter Brennan, Mary Brian, Lyle Talbot	Comedy drama	Republic
Alcatraz Island	William C. McGann	Ann Sheridan, George E. Stone, John Litel	Crime	Warner Bros.
Ali Baba Goes to Town	David Butler	Eddie Cantor, Tony Martin, Gypsy Rose Lee	Musical comedy	20th Century Fox
All American Sweetheart	Lambert Hillyer	Patricia Farr, Scott Kolk, Gene Morgan	Crime	Columbia
All Over Town	James W. Horne	Ole Olsen, Chic Johnson, Mary Howard	Musical comedy	Republic
Amateur Crook	Sam Katzman	Joan Barclay, Bruce Bennett, Vivien Oakland	Comedy	Independent
Angel	Ernst Lubitsch	Marlene Dietrich, Melvyn Douglas, Herbert Marshall	Comedy drama	Paramount
Angel's Holiday	James Tinling	Jane Withers, Joan Davis, Sally Blane	Comedy	20th Century Fox
Annapolis Salute	Christy Cabanne	James Ellison, Marsha Hunt, Van Heflin	Drama	RKO
Another Dawn	William Dieterle	Kay Francis, Errol Flynn, Ian Hunter	Drama	Warner Bros.
Anything for a Thrill	Leslie Goodwins	Frankie Darro, Kane Richmond, June Johnson	Crime	Independent
Arizona Days	John English	Tex Ritter, Syd Saylor, William Faversham	Western	Grand National
Arizona Gunfighter	Sam Newfield	Bob Steele, Jean Carmen, Ted Adams	Western	Republic
Armored Car	Lewis R. Foster	Robert Wilcox, Judith Barrett, Cesar Romero	Crime	Universal
Artists and Models	Raoul Walsh	Jack Benny, Ida Lupino, Richard Arlen	Musical comedy	Paramount
As Good as Married	Edward Buzzell	John Boles, Doris Nolan, Walter Pidgeon	Comedy	Universal
Atlantic Flight	William Nigh	Dick Merrill, Paula Stone, Weldon Heyburn	Adventure	Monogram
The Awful Truth	Leo McCarey	Cary Grant, Irene Dunne, Ralph Bellamy	Comedy	Columbia
Back in Circulation	Ray Enright	Pat O'Brien, Joan Blondell, Margaret Lindsay	Comedy drama	Warner Bros.
Bad Guy	Edward L. Cahn	Bruce Cabot, Virginia Grey, Charley Grapewin	Crime	MGM
The Bad Man of Brimstone	J. Walter Ruben	Wallace Beery, Virginia Bruce, Lewis Stone	Western	MGM
Bank Alarm	Louis J. Gasnier	Conrad Nagel, Eleanor Hunt, Vince Barnett	Crime Drama	Grand National
Bar-Z Bad Men	Sam Newfield	Johnny Mack Brown, Lois January, Tom London	Western	Republic
The Barrier	Lesley Selander	Leo Carrillo, Jean Parker, Otto Kruger	Adventure	Paramount
Battle of Greed	Howard Higgin	James Bush, Jimmy Butler, Tom Keene	Western	Independent
Beg, Borrow or Steal	Leonard Lee	Florence Rice, Frank Morgan, Herman Bing	Comedy	MGM
Behind the Headlines	Richard Rosson	Lee Tracy, Diana Gibson, Donald Meek	Crime	RKO
Behind the Mike	Sidney Salkow	William Gargan, Judith Barrett, Sterling Holloway	Comedy	Universal
Between Two Women	George B. Seitz	Franchot Tone, Maureen O'Sullivan, Virginia Bruce	Drama	MGM
Big City	Frank Borzage	Spencer Tracy, Luise Rainer, Eddie Quillan	Drama	MGM
The Big Shot	Edward Killy	Guy Kibbee, Cora Witherspoon, Gordon Jones	Comedy	RKO
Big Town Girl	Alfred L. Werker	Claire Trevor, Donald Woods, Spencer Charters	Comedy crime	20th Century Fox
Bill Cracks Down	William Nigh	Grant Withers, Beatrice Roberts, Judith Allen	Action	Republic
Black Aces	Lesley Selander	Buck Jones, Kay Linaker, Robert Frazer	Western	Universal
Black Legion	Archie Mayo, Michael Curtiz	Humphrey Bogart, Ann Sheridan, Joe Sawyer	Drama	Warner Bros.
Blazing Barriers	Aubrey Scotto	Junior Coghlan, Florine McKinney, Irene Franklin	Drama	Monogram
Blazing Sixes	Noel M. Smith	Dick Foran, Joan Valerie, John Merton	Western	Warner Bros.
Blonde Trouble	George Archainbaud	Eleanore Whitney, Johnny Downs, Lynne Overman	Comedy	Paramount
Blossoms on Broadway	Richard Wallace	Edward Arnold, Shirley Ross, John Trent	Comedy	Paramount
Boothill Brigade	Sam Newfield	Johnny Mack Brown, Claire Rochelle, Dick Curtis	Western	Republic
Boots and Saddles	Joseph Kane	Gene Autry, Judith Allen, Ronald Sinclair	Western	Republic
Boots of Destiny	Arthur Rosson	Ken Maynard, Claudia Dell, Vince Barnett	Western	Grand National
Border Cafe	Lew Landers	George Irving, Harry Carey, Leona Roberts	Western	RKO
Border Phantom	S. Roy Luby	Bob Steele, Harlene Wood, Don Barclay	Western	Republic
Borderland	Nate Watt	William Boyd, Gabby Hayes, James Ellison	Western	Paramount
Born Reckless	Malcolm St. Clair	Rochelle Hudson, Brian Donlevy, Barton MacLane	Crime	20th Century Fox
Born to the West	Charles Barton	John Wayne, Marsha Hunt, Johnny Mack Brown	Western	Paramount
Borrowing Trouble	Frank R. Strayer	Jed Prouty, Shirley Deane, Spring Byington	Comedy	20th Century Fox
Boss of Lonely Valley	Ray Taylor	Buck Jones, Muriel Evans, Harvey Clark	Western	Universal
Boy of the Streets	William Nigh	Jackie Cooper, Kathleen Burke, Marjorie Main	Drama	Monogram
Breakfast for Two	Alfred Santell	Barbara Stanwyck, Glenda Farrell, Herbert Marshall	Comedy	RKO
Breezing Home	Milton Carruth	Binnie Barnes, William Gargan, Wendy Barrie	Drama	Universal
A Bride for Henry	William Nigh	Anne Nagel, Warren Hull, Claudia Dell	Romance	Monogram
The Bride Wore Red	Dorothy Arzner	Joan Crawford, Franchot Tone, Billie Burke	Comedy drama	MGM
Broadway Melody of 1938	Roy Del Ruth	Robert Taylor, Eleanor Powell, Judy Garland	Musical	MGM
Bulldog Drummond Comes Back	Louis King	John Howard, John Barrymore, Louise Campbell	Thriller	Paramount
Bulldog Drummond Escapes	James P. Hogan	Ray Milland, Guy Standing, Heather Angel	Thriller	Paramount
Bulldog Drummond's Revenge	Louis King	John Barrymore, John Howard, Louise Campbell	Thriller	Paramount

== C–D ==
Title	Director	Cast	Genre	Notes
Cafe Metropole	Edward H. Griffith	Loretta Young, Tyrone Power, Adolphe Menjou	Comedy	20th Century Fox
California Straight Ahead	Arthur Lubin	John Wayne, Louise Latimer, Theodore von Eltz	Action	Universal
The Californian	Gus Meins	Ricardo Cortez, Marjorie Weaver, Katherine DeMille	Western	20th Century Fox
Call It a Day	Archie Mayo	Olivia de Havilland, Ian Hunter, Frieda Inescort	Comedy	Warner Bros.
Captains Courageous	Victor Fleming	Spencer Tracy, Freddie Bartholomew, Lionel Barrymore	Adventure	MGM
Carnival Queen	Nate Watt	Robert Wilcox, Dorothea Kent, Hobart Cavanaugh	Crime	Universal
The Case of the Stuttering Bishop	William Clemens	Donald Woods, Ann Dvorak, Anne Nagel	Mystery	Warner Bros.
Champagne Waltz	A. Edward Sutherland	Fred MacMurray, Jack Oakie, Vivienne Osborne	Comedy	Paramount
Charlie Chan at Monte Carlo	Eugene Forde	Warner Oland, Keye Luke, Virginia Field	Mystery	20th Century Fox
Charlie Chan at the Olympics	H. Bruce Humberstone	Warner Oland, Katherine DeMille, Pauline Moore	Mystery	20th Century Fox
Charlie Chan on Broadway	Eugene Forde	Warner Oland, Keye Luke, Joan Marsh	Mystery	20th Century Fox
Checkers	H. Bruce Humberstone	Jane Withers, Stuart Erwin, Una Merkel	Drama	20th Century Fox
The Cherokee Strip	Noel M. Smith	Dick Foran, Jane Bryan, Joan Valerie	Western	Warner Bros.
Cheyenne Rides Again	Robert F. Hill	Tom Tyler, Lon Chaney Jr., Carmen Laroux	Western	Independent
China Passage	Edward Killy	Leslie Fenton, Vinton Hayworth, Constance Worth	Mystery	RKO
Circus Girl	John H. Auer	June Travis, Robert Livingston, Donald Cook	Drama	Republic
Clarence	George Archainbaud	Roscoe Karns, Eleanore Whitney, Eugene Pallette	Comedy	Paramount
Clipped Wings	Stuart Paton	Lloyd Hughes, William Janney, Rosalind Keith	Action	Independent
The Colorado Kid	Sam Newfield	Bob Steele, Karl Hackett, Ernie Adams	Western	Republic
Come On, Cowboys	Joseph Kane	Robert Livingston, Maxine Doyle, Ray Corrigan	Western	Republic
Confession	Joe May	Kay Francis, Basil Rathbone, Ian Hunter	Drama	Warner Bros.
Conquest	Clarence Brown	Greta Garbo, Charles Boyer, Reginald Owen	Historical	MGM
Counsel for Crime	John Brahm	Otto Kruger, Douglass Montgomery, Thurston Hall	Crime drama	Columbia
County Fair	Howard Bretherton	John Arledge, Mary Lawrence, Fuzzy Knight	Sports	Monogram
Courage of the West	Joseph H. Lewis	Bob Baker, J. Farrell MacDonald, Lois January	Western	Universal
The Crime Nobody Saw	Charles Barton	Lew Ayres, Eugene Pallette, Vivienne Osborne	Comedy	Paramount
Criminal Lawyer	Christy Cabanne	Lee Tracy, Eduardo Ciannelli, William Stack	Drama	RKO
Criminals of the Air	Charles C. Coleman	Rosalind Keith, Charles Quigley, Rita Hayworth	Action	Columbia
Damaged Goods	Phil Goldstone	Pedro de Cordoba, Phyllis Barry, Douglas Walton	Drama	Grand National
A Damsel in Distress	George Stevens	Fred Astaire, Joan Fontaine, Montagu Love	Musical comedy	RKO
Dance Charlie Dance	Frank McDonald	Stuart Erwin, Jean Muir, Glenda Farrell	Comedy	Warner Bros.
Danger – Love at Work	Otto Preminger	Ann Sothern, Edward Everett Horton, John Carradine	Comedy	20th Century Fox
Danger Patrol	Lew Landers	Sally Eilers, John Beal, Harry Carey	Drama	RKO
Danger Valley	Robert N. Bradbury	Addison Randall, Lois Wilde, Charles King	Western	Monogram
A Dangerous Adventure	D. Ross Lederman	Don Terry, Rosalind Keith, Russell Hicks	Drama	Columbia
Dangerous Holiday	Nicholas T. Barrows	Guinn "Big Boy" Williams, Hedda Hopper, Jack La Rue	Drama	Republic
Dangerous Number	Richard Thorpe	Robert Young, Ann Sothern, Cora Witherspoon	Comedy	MGM
Dangerously Yours	Malcolm St. Clair	Cesar Romero, Phyllis Brooks, Jane Darwell	Crime	20th Century Fox
Dark Manhattan	Ralph Cooper, Harry L. Fraser	Ralph Cooper, Clarence Brooks, Sam McDaniel	Crime	Independent
Daughter of Shanghai	Robert Florey	Anna May Wong, Charles Bickford, Buster Crabbe	Crime	Paramount
A Day at the Races	Sam Wood	Groucho Marx, Chico Marx, Maureen O'Sullivan	Comedy	MGM
Dead End	William Wyler	Sylvia Sidney, Joel McCrea, Humphrey Bogart	Crime drama	United Artists
The Devil Diamond	Leslie Goodwins	Frankie Darro, Kane Richmond, June Gale	Crime	Independent
The Devil Is Driving	Harry Lachman	Richard Dix, Joan Perry, Nana Bryant	Drama	Columbia
Devil's Playground	Erle C. Kenton	Dolores del Río, Richard Dix, Ward Bond	Drama	Columbia
The Devil's Saddle Legion	Bobby Connolly	Dick Foran, Anne Nagel, Willard Parker	Western	Warner Bros.
A Doctor's Diary	Charles Vidor	George Bancroft, Helen Burgess, Molly Lamont	Drama	Paramount
Don't Tell the Wife	Christy Cabanne	Guy Kibbee, Una Merkel, Guinn Williams	Comedy	RKO
Doomed at Sundown	Sam Newfield	Bob Steele, Warner Richmond, Earl Dwire	Western	Republic
Double or Nothing	Theodore Reed	Bing Crosby, Mary Carlisle, Martha Raye	Musical comedy	Paramount
Double Wedding	Richard Thorpe	William Powell, Myrna Loy, Florence Rice	Comedy	MGM
Draegerman Courage	Louis King	Jean Muir, Barton MacLane, Henry O'Neill	Drama	Warner Bros.
Drums of Destiny	Ray Taylor	Tom Keene, Edna Lawrence, Budd Buster	Western	Independent
The Duke Comes Back	Irving Pichel	Allan Lane, Heather Angel, Genevieve Tobin	Drama	Republic

== E–F ==
Title	Director	Cast	Genre	Notes
Easy Living	Mitchell Leisen	Jean Arthur, Ray Milland, Edward Arnold	Comedy	Paramount
Ebb Tide	James P. Hogan	Frances Farmer, Ray Milland, Oskar Homolka	Adventure	Paramount
The Emperor's Candlesticks	George Fitzmaurice	William Powell, Luise Rainer, Robert Young	Drama	MGM
Empty Holsters	B. Reeves Eason	Dick Foran, Emmett Vogan, Glenn Strange	Western	Warner Bros.
Escape by Night	Hamilton MacFadden	William Hall, Dean Jagger, Ward Bond	Crime	Republic
Espionage	Kurt Neumann	Edmund Lowe, Madge Evans, Paul Lukas	Thriller	MGM
Ever Since Eve	Lloyd Bacon	Marion Davies, Robert Montgomery, Frank McHugh	Comedy	Warner Bros.
Every Day's a Holiday	A. Edward Sutherland	Mae West, Edmund Lowe, Louis Armstrong	Comedy	Paramount
Exclusive	Alexander Hall	Fred MacMurray, Frances Farmer, Porter Hall	Drama	Paramount
Exiled to Shanghai	Nick Grinde	Wallace Ford, June Travis, Dean Jagger	Comedy	Republic
Expensive Husbands	Bobby Connolly	Beverly Roberts, Patric Knowles, Allyn Joslyn	Comedy	Warner Bros.
Fair Warning	Norman Foster	J. Edward Bromberg, Betty Furness, Bill Burrud	Mystery	20th Century Fox
A Family Affair	George B. Seitz	Lionel Barrymore, Spring Byington, Mickey Rooney	Comedy	MGM
Federal Bullets	Karl Brown	Milburn Stone, Zeffie Tilbury, William Harrigan	Crime	Monogram
Feud of the Trail	Robert F. Hill	Tom Tyler, Harlene Wood, Milburn Morante	Independent	
Fifty Roads to Town	Norman Taurog	Don Ameche, Ann Sothern, Jane Darwell	Comedy	20th Century Fox
Fight for Your Lady	Benjamin Stoloff	John Boles, Ida Lupino, Jack Oakie	Romantic Comedy	RKO
A Fight to the Finish	Charles C. Coleman	Don Terry, Rosalind Keith, Ward Bond	Drama	Columbia
The Fighting Deputy	Sam Newfield	Fred Scott, Al St. John, Marjorie Beebe	Western	Independent
The Fighting Texan	Charles Abbott	Kermit Maynard, Elaine Shepard, Budd Buster	Western	Independent
Find the Witness	David Selman	Charles Quigley, Henry Mollison, Rosalind Keith	Drama	Columbia
The Firefly	Robert Z. Leonard	Jeanette MacDonald, Allan Jones, Warren William	Musical	MGM
First Lady	Stanley Logan	Kay Francis, Verree Teasdale, Walter Connolly	Comedy	Warner Bros.
Fit for a King	Edward Sedgwick	Joe E. Brown, Helen Mack, Paul Kelly	Comedy	RKO
Flight from Glory	Lew Landers	Chester Morris, Van Heflin, Whitney Bourne	Drama	RKO
Fly-Away Baby	Frank McDonald	Glenda Farrell, Barton MacLane, Gordon Oliver	Comedy/ Mystery	Warner Bros.
Flying Fists	Robert F. Hill	Bruce Bennett, Guinn "Big Boy" Williams, Fuzzy Knight	Sports	Independent
The Footloose Heiress	William Clemens	Craig Reynolds, Ann Sheridan, Anne Nagel	Comedy	Warner Bros.
Forlorn River	Charles Barton	Buster Crabbe, June Martel, Syd Saylor	Western	Paramount
Forty Naughty Girls	Edward F. Cline	ZaSu Pitts, James Gleason, Marjorie Lord	Mystery	RKO
The Frame-Up	D. Ross Lederman	Paul Kelly, Julie Bishop, George McKay	Crime	Columbia

== G–H ==
Title	Director	Cast	Genre	Notes
Galloping Dynamite	Harry L. Fraser	Kermit Maynard, John Merton, David Sharpe	Western	Independent
The Gambling Terror	Sam Newfield	Johnny Mack Brown, Iris Meredith, Charles King	Western	Republic
The Game That Kills	D. Ross Lederman	Charles Quigley, Rita Hayworth, John Gallaudet	Mystery	Columbia
The Girl from Scotland Yard	Robert G. Vignola	Karen Morley, Eduardo Ciannelli, Katharine Alexander	Mystery	Paramount
Girl Loves Boy	Duncan Mansfield	Eric Linden, Cecilia Parker, Roger Imhof	Drama	Grand National
Girl Overboard	Sidney Salkow	Gloria Stuart, Walter Pidgeon, Hobart Cavanaugh	Mystery	Universal
The Girl Said No	Andrew L. Stone	Robert Armstrong, Irene Hervey, Paula Stone	Musical comedy	Grand National
A Girl with Ideas	S. Sylvan Simon	Wendy Barrie, Walter Pidgeon, Kent Taylor	Comedy	Universal
Girls Can Play	Lambert Hillyer	Julie Bishop, Charles Quigley, Rita Hayworth	Drama	Columbia
Git Along Little Dogies	Joseph Kane	Gene Autry, Judith Allen, Smiley Burnette	Western	Republic
The Go Getter	Busby Berkeley	George Brent, Anita Louise, Henry O'Neill	Musical comedy	Warner Bros.
God's Country and the Man	Robert North Bradbury	Tom Keene, Betty Compson, Charlotte Henry	Western	Monogram
God's Country and the Woman	William Keighley	George Brent, Beverly Roberts, Barton MacLane	Drama	Warner Bros.
The Gold Racket	Louis J. Gasnier	Conrad Nagel, Eleanor Hunt, Fuzzy Knight	Crime	Grand National
The Good Earth	Sidney Franklin, Victor Fleming	Paul Muni, Luise Rainer, Walter Connolly	Drama	MGM
The Good Old Soak	J. Walter Ruben	Wallace Beery, Una Merkel, Judith Barrett	Drama	MGM
The Great Gambini	Charles Vidor	Marian Marsh, Akim Tamiroff, William Demarest	Mystery	Paramount
The Great Garrick	James Whale	Olivia de Havilland, Brian Aherne, Edward Everett Horton	Comedy	Warner Bros.
The Great Hospital Mystery	James Tinling	Jane Darwell, Sig Ruman, Sally Blane	Mystery	20th Century Fox
The Great O'Malley	William Dieterle	Pat O'Brien, Humphrey Bogart, Ann Sheridan	Drama	Warner Bros.
Green Fields	Edgar G. Ulmer	Helen Beverley, Herschel Bernardi, Michael Gorrin	Comedy drama	Yiddish
Green Light	Frank Borzage	Errol Flynn, Anita Louise, Cedric Hardwicke	Drama	Warner Bros.
Gun Lords of Stirrup Basin	Sam Newfield	Bob Steele, Louis Stanley, Karl Hackett	Western	Republic
Guns in the Dark	Sam Newfield	Johnny Mack Brown, Claire Rochelle, Syd Saylor	Western	Republic
Guns of the Pecos	Noel M. Smith	Dick Foran, Anne Nagel, Joseph Crehan	Western	Warner Bros.
Gunsmoke Ranch	Joseph Kane	Robert Livingston, Ray "Crash" Corrigan, Jean Carmen	Western	Republic
Harlem on the Prairie	Jed Buell, Sam Newfield	Herb Jeffries, Mantan Moreland, Nathan Curry	Western	Independent
Headin' East	Ewing Scott	Buck Jones, Ruth Coleman, Don Douglas	Western	Columbia
Heart of the Rockies	Joseph Kane	Robert Livingston, Ray Corrigan, Lynne Roberts	Western	Republic
Heidi	Allan Dwan	Shirley Temple, Jean Hersholt, Arthur Treacher	Drama	20th Century Fox
Her Husband Lies	Edward Ludwig	Gail Patrick, Ricardo Cortez, Louis Calhern	Drama	Paramount
Her Husband's Secretary	Frank McDonald	Jean Muir, Beverly Roberts, Warren Hull	Drama	Warner Bros.
Here's Flash Casey	Lynn Shores	Eric Linden, Boots Mallory, Holmes Herbert	Action	Grand National
Heroes of the Alamo	Harry L. Fraser	Rex Lease, Lane Chandler, Earle Hodgins	Western	Independent
Hideaway	Richard Rosson	J. Carrol Naish, Emma Dunn, Fred Stone	Comedy	RKO
High Flyers	Edward F. Cline	Bert Wheeler, Robert Woolsey, Lupe Vélez	Musical comedy	RKO
High Hat	Clifford Sanforth	Frank Luther, Dorothy Dare, Lona Andre	Musical comedy	Independent
High, Wide and Handsome	Rouben Mamoulian	Irene Dunne, Randolph Scott, Dorothy Lamour	Western, Musical	Paramount
Hills of Old Wyoming	Nate Watt	William Boyd, Gabby Hayes, Gail Sheridan	Western	Paramount
History Is Made at Night	Frank Borzage	Charles Boyer, Jean Arthur, Colin Clive	Drama	United Artists
Hit Parade of 1937	Gus Meins	Louise Henry, Phil Regan, Duke Ellington	Musical	Republic
Hit the Saddle	Mack V. Wright	Robert Livingston, Rita Hayworth, Ray "Crash" Corrigan	Western	Republic
Hitting a New High	Raoul Walsh	Lily Pons, Edward Everett Horton, Eric Blore	Musical comedy	RKO
Hittin' the Trail	Robert N. Bradbury	Tex Ritter, Hank Worden, Earl Dwire	Western	Grand National
Hollywood Cowboy	Ewing Scott	George O'Brien, Cecilia Parker, Maude Eburne	Western	RKO
Hollywood Hotel	Busby Berkeley	Dick Powell, Rosemary Lane, Hugh Herbert	Musical comedy	Warner Bros.
Hollywood Round-Up	Ewing Scott	Buck Jones, Helen Twelvetrees, Grant Withers	Western	Columbia
The Holy Terror	James Tinling	Jane Withers, Joe E. Lewis, Tony Martin	Comedy drama	20th Century Fox
Hoosier Schoolboy	William Nigh	Mickey Rooney, Anne Nagel, Frank Shields	Drama	Monogram
Hopalong Rides Again	Lesley Selander	William Boyd, Nora Lane, George "Gabby" Hayes	Western	Paramount
Hot Water	Frank R. Strayer	Jed Prouty, Shirley Deane, Spring Byington	Comedy	20th Century Fox
Hotel Haywire	George Archainbaud	Leo Carrillo, Lynne Overman, Spring Byington	Comedy	Paramount
The Hurricane	John Ford	Dorothy Lamour, Mary Astor, Jon Hall	Adventure	United Artists

== I–J ==
Title	Director	Cast	Genre	Notes
I Cover the War!	Arthur Lubin	John Wayne, Gwen Gaze. Don Barclay	War drama	Universal
Idol of the Crowds	Arthur Lubin	John Wayne, Sheila Bromley, Huntley Gordon	Sports drama	Universal
I Met Him in Paris	Wesley Ruggles	Claudette Colbert, Robert Young, Melvyn Douglas	Romantic comedy	Paramount
I Promise to Pay	D. Ross Lederman	Chester Morris, Leo Carrillo, Helen Mack	Drama	Columbia
I'll Take Romance	Edward H. Griffith	Grace Moore, Melvyn Douglas, Stuart Erwin	Musical comedy	Columbia
In Old Chicago	Henry King	Tyrone Power, Alice Brady, Don Ameche	Musical	Fox
Internes Can't Take Money	Alfred Santell	Barbara Stanwyck, Joel McCrea, Lloyd Nolan	Drama	Paramount
Island Captives	Paul Kerschner	Edward Nugent, Joan Barclay, Henry Brandon	Adventure	Independent
It Can't Last Forever	Hamilton MacFadden	Ralph Bellamy, Betty Furness, Robert Armstrong	Comedy	Columbia
It Could Happen to You!	Phil Rosen	Alan Baxter, Andrea Leeds, Astrid Allwyn	Drama	Republic
It Happened in Hollywood	Harry Lachman	Fay Wray, Richard Dix, Franklin Pangborn	Comedy	Columbia
It Happened Out West	Howard Bretherton	Paul Kelly, Judith Allen, LeRoy Mason	Western	20th Century Fox
It's All Yours	Elliott Nugent	Madeleine Carroll, Mischa Auer, Francis Lederer	Comedy	Columbia
It's Love I'm After	Archie Mayo	Bette Davis, Olivia de Havilland, Leslie Howard	Romantic comedy	Warner Bros.
Jim Hanvey, Detective	Phil Rosen	Guy Kibbee, Tom Brown, Catherine Doucet	Mystery	Republic
John Meade's Woman	Richard Wallace	Edward Arnold, Gail Patrick, George Bancroft	Drama	Paramount
Join the Marines	Ralph Staub	Paul Kelly, June Travis, Reginald Denny	Action	Republic
The Jones Family in Big Business	Frank R. Strayer	Jed Prouty, Shirley Deane, Spring Byington	Comedy	20th Century Fox

== K–L ==
Title	Director	Cast	Genre	Notes
Kid Galahad	Michael Curtiz	Edward G. Robinson, Bette Davis, Humphrey Bogart	Drama	Warner Bros.
The King and the Chorus Girl	Mervyn LeRoy	Joan Blondell, Fernand Gravey, Edward Everett Horton	Comedy	Warner Bros.
King of Gamblers	Robert Florey	Akim Tamiroff, Claire Trevor, Lloyd Nolan	Crime	Paramount
The Lady Escapes	Eugene Forde	Gloria Stuart, Michael Whalen, George Sanders	Comedy	20th Century Fox
The Lady Fights Back	Milton Carruth	Kent Taylor, Irene Hervey, William Lundigan	Drama	Universal
Lancer Spy	Gregory Ratoff	Dolores del Río, George Sanders, Peter Lorre	Thriller	20th Century Fox
Land Beyond the Law	B. Reeves Eason	Dick Foran, Wayne Morris, Harry Woods	Western	Warner Bros.
Larceny on the Air	Irving Pichel	Robert Livingston, Grace Bradley, Willard Robertson	Crime	Republic
The Last Gangster	Edward Ludwig	Edward G. Robinson, James Stewart, Rose Stradner	Crime	MGM
The Last of Mrs. Cheyney	Dorothy Arzner	Joan Crawford, William Powell, Nigel Bruce	Comedy drama	MGM
The Last Train from Madrid	James P. Hogan	Dorothy Lamour, Lew Ayres, Gilbert Roland	Drama	Paramount
The Law Commands	William Nigh	Tom Keene, Robert Fiske, Budd Buster	Western	Independent
Law for Tombstone	Buck Jones	Muriel Evans, Harvey Clark, Carl Stockdale	Western	Universal
Law of the Ranger	Spencer Gordon Bennet	Robert Allen, Elaine Shepard, John Merton	Western	Columbia
Lawless Land	Albert Ray	Johnny Mack Brown, Louise Stanley, Julian Rivero	Western	Republic
A Lawman Is Born	Sam Newfield	Johnny Mack Brown, Iris Meredith, Warner Richmond	Western	Republic
The League of Frightened Men	Alfred E. Green	Walter Connolly, Irene Hervey, Lionel Stander	Mystery	Columbia
Left-Handed Law	Lesley Selander	Buck Jones, Noel Francis, Nina Quartero	Western	Universal
The Legion of Missing Men	Hamilton MacFadden	Ralph Forbes, Roy D'Arcy, Ben Alexander	Adventure	Monogram
Let Them Live	Harold Young	John Howard, Nan Grey, Judith Barrett	Drama	Universal
Let's Get Married	Alfred E. Green	Ida Lupino, Ralph Bellamy, Walter Connolly	Comedy	Columbia
Life Begins in College	William A. Seiter	The Ritz Brothers, Gloria Stuart, Joan Davis	Comedy	20th Century Fox
Life Begins with Love	Ray McCarey	Jean Parker, Douglass Montgomery, Edith Fellows	Romantic drama	Columbia
The Life of Émile Zola	William Dieterle	Paul Muni, Joseph Schildkraut, Gale Sondergaard	Drama	Warner Bros.
The Life of the Party	William A. Seiter	Gene Raymond, Franklin Pangborn, Ann Miller	Musical comedy	RKO
Lightnin' Crandall	Sam Newfield	Bob Steele, Lois January, Charles King	Western	Republic
Live, Love and Learn	George Fitzmaurice	Rosalind Russell, Robert Benchley, Monty Woolley	Comedy	MGM
Living on Love	Lew Landers	Whitney Bourne, Joan Woodbury, James Dunn	Comedy	RKO
London by Night	Wilhelm Thiele	George Murphy, Rita Johnson, Virginia Field	Mystery	MGM
Lost Horizon	Frank Capra	Ronald Colman, Jane Wyatt, H. B. Warner	Fantasy adventure	Columbia
Lost Ranch	Sam Katzman	Tom Tyler, Slim Whitaker, Theodore Lorch	Western	Independent
Love and Hisses	Sidney Lanfield	Walter Winchell, Simone Simon, Joan Davis	Comedy	20th Century Fox
Love in a Bungalow	Ray McCarey	Nan Grey, Kent Taylor, Louise Beavers	Comedy	Universal
Love Is News	Tay Garnett	Tyrone Power, Loretta Young, Don Ameche	Romantic comedy	20th Century Fox
Love Is on the Air	Nick Grinde	Ronald Reagan, June Travis, Eddie Acuff	Mystery	Warner Bros.
Love on Toast	E. A. Dupont	John Payne, Stella Adler, Grant Richards	Comedy	Paramount
Love Takes Flight	Conrad Nagel	Bruce Cabot, Beatrice Roberts, Edwin Maxwell	Drama	Grand National
Love Under Fire	George Marshall	Loretta Young, Don Ameche, Katherine DeMille	Drama	20th Century Fox
Luck of Roaring Camp	Irvin Willat	Owen Davis, Joan Woodbury, Sheila Bromley	Western	Monogram

== M–N ==
Title	Director	Cast	Genre	Notes
Madame X	Sam Wood	Gladys George, Warren William, Reginald Owen	Drama	MGM
Maid of Salem	Frank Lloyd	Claudette Colbert, Fred MacMurray, Gale Sondergaard	Historical	Paramount
Make a Wish	Kurt Neumann	Bobby Breen, Basil Rathbone, Ralph Forbes	Musical	RKO
Make Way for Tomorrow	Leo McCarey	Victor Moore, Beulah Bondi, Thomas Mitchell	Drama	Paramount
Mama Runs Wild	Ralph Staub	Mary Boland, Ernest Truex, Lynne Roberts	Comedy	Republic
Mama Steps Out	George B. Seitz, Anita Loos	Alice Brady, Gene Lockhart, Guy Kibbee	Comedy	MGM
The Man in Blue	Milton Carruth	Robert Wilcox, Nan Grey, Edward Ellis	Crime	Universal
Man of the People	Edwin L. Marin	Joseph Calleia, Florence Rice, Ted Healy	Drama	MGM
The Man in Blue	Milton Carruth	Robert Wilcox, Edward Ellis, Nan Grey	Crime	Universal
The Man Who Cried Wolf	Lewis R. Foster	Lewis Stone, Jameson Thomas, Barbara Read	Drama	Universal
The Man Who Found Himself	Lew Landers	Joan Fontaine, George Irving, John Beal	Drama	RKO
Manhattan Merry-Go-Round	Charles Reisner	Ann Dvorak, Cab Calloway, Louis Prima	Musical	Republic
Manhattan Shakedown	Leon Barsha	John Gallaudet, Rosalind Keith, Phyllis Clare	Crime	Independent
Mannequin	Frank Borzage	Joan Crawford, Spencer Tracy, Alan Curtis	Drama	MGM
Marked Woman	Lloyd Bacon, Michael Curtiz	Bette Davis, Humphrey Bogart, Eduardo Ciannelli	Crime	Warner Bros.
Married Before Breakfast	Edwin L. Marin	Robert Young, Florence Rice, Barnett Parker	Comedy	MGM
Marry the Girl	William C. McGann	Mary Boland, Hugh Herbert, Mischa Auer	Comedy	Warner Bros.
Maytime	Robert Z. Leonard	Jeanette MacDonald, Nelson Eddy, John Barrymore	Musical	MGM
Melody of the Plains	Sam Newfield	Fred Scott, Al St. John, David Sharpe	Western	Independent
Melody for Two	Louis King	James Melton, Patricia Ellis, Marie Wilson	Musical	Warner Bros.
Men in Exile	John Farrow	Dick Purcell, June Travis, Victor Varconi	Crime	Warner Bros.
Meet the Boyfriend	Ralph Staub	Robert Paige, Carol Hughes, Warren Hymer	Comedy	Republic
Meet the Missus	Joseph Santley	Victor Moore, Helen Broderick, Anne Shirley	Comedy	RKO
Merry-Go-Round of 1938	Irving Cummings	Bert Lahr, Jimmy Savo, Alice Brady	Comedy	Universal
Michael O'Halloran	Karl Brown	Wynne Gibson, Warren Hull, Jackie Moran	Drama	Republic
Midnight Court	Frank McDonald	Ann Dvorak, Joseph Crehan, John Litel	Drama	Warner Bros.
Midnight Madonna	James Flood	Warren William, Mady Correll, Edward Ellis	Drama	Paramount
Midnight Taxi	Eugene Forde	Brian Donlevy, Frances Drake, Alan Dinehart	Crime	20th Century Fox
The Mighty Treve	Lewis D. Collins	Noah Beery, Barbara Read, Hobart Cavanaugh	Western	Universal
Mile-a-Minute-Love	Elmer Clifton	William Bakewell, Arletta Duncan, Duncan Renaldo	Drama	Independent
Million Dollar Racket	Robert F. Hill	Bruce Bennett, Joan Barclay, Bryant Washburn	Crime	Independent
A Million to One	Lynn Shores	Bruce Bennett, Joan Fontaine, Monte Blue	Sports	Independent
Missing Witnesses	William Clemens	John Litel, Dick Purcell, Sheila Bromley	Crime	Warner Bros.
Moonlight on the Range	Sam Newfield	Fred Scott, Al St. John, Lois January	Western	Independent
Motor Madness	D. Ross Lederman	Rosalind Keith, Marc Lawrence, J.M. Kerrigan	Drama	Columbia
Mountain Justice	Michael Curtiz	Josephine Hutchinson, Guy Kibbee, George Brent	Drama	Warner Bros.
Mountain Music	Robert Florey	Bob Burns, Martha Raye, John Howard	Musical	Paramount
Mr. Dodd Takes the Air	Alfred E. Green	Kenny Baker, Frank McHugh, Alice Brady	Musical comedy	Warner Bros.
Murder Goes to College	Charles Reisner	Roscoe Karns, Marsha Hunt, Lynne Overman	Mystery	Paramount
Murder in Greenwich Village	Albert S. Rogell	Fay Wray, Richard Arlen, Raymond Walburn	Mystery	Columbia
Murder Is News	Leon Barsha	John Gallaudet, Iris Meredith, George McKay	Mystery	Columbia
Music for Madame	John G. Blystone	Nino Martini, Joan Fontaine, Alan Mowbray	Musical comedy	RKO
My Dear Miss Aldrich	George B. Seitz	Maureen O'Sullivan, Walter Pidgeon, Edna May Oliver	Comedy	MGM
The Mystery of the Hooded Horsemen	Ray Taylor	Tex Ritter, Iris Meredith, Horace Murphy	Western	Grand National
Mystery Range	Sam Katzman	Tom Tyler, Milburn Morante, Lafe McKee	Western	Independent
Nancy Steele Is Missing!	George Marshall; Otto Preminger	Victor McLaglen, Walter Connolly, Peter Lorre	Drama	20th Century Fox
Nation Aflame	Victor Halperin	Noel Madison, Lila Lee Douglas Walton	Drama	Independent
Navy Blue and Gold	Sam Wood	James Stewart, Robert Young, Lionel Barrymore	Sports	MGM
Navy Blues	Ralph Staub	Dick Purcell, Mary Brian, Warren Hymer	Comedy	Republic
Navy Spy	Joseph H. Lewis, Crane Wilbur	Conrad Nagel, Eleanor Hunt, Judith Allen	Thriller	Grand National
New Faces of 1937	Leigh Jason	Joe Penner, Milton Berle, Harriet Hilliard	Musical	RKO
Night Club Scandal	Ralph Murphy	John Barrymore, Louise Campbell, Lynne Overman	Drama	Paramount
Night Key	Lloyd Corrigan	Boris Karloff, Jean Rogers, Alan Baxter	Horror	Universal
Night Must Fall	Richard Thorpe	Rosalind Russell, Robert Montgomery, Dame May Whitty	Thriller	MGM
Night of Mystery	E.A. Dupont	Grant Richards, Roscoe Karns, Helen Burgess	Mystery	Paramount
Nobody's Baby	Gus Meins	Patsy Kelly, Lyda Roberti, Lynne Overman	Comedy	MGM
North of the Rio Grande	Nate Watt	William Boyd, Gabby Hayes, Lee J. Cobb	Western	Paramount
Nothing Sacred	William A. Wellman	Carole Lombard, Fredric March, Walter Connolly	Comedy	United Artists

== O–P ==
Title	Director	Cast	Genre	Notes
Off to the Races	Frank R. Strayer	Slim Summerville, Jed Prouty, Shirley Deane	Comedy	20th Century Fox
Oh, Doctor	Ray McCarey	Edward Everett Horton, Eve Arden, Thurston Hall	Comedy	Universal
Old Louisiana	Irvin Willat	Tom Keene, Rita Hayworth, Allan Cavan	Western	Independent
The Old Wyoming Trail	Folmar Blangsted	Charles Starrett, Barbara Weeks, Dick Curtis	Western	Universal
On Again-Off Again	Edward F. Cline	Bert Wheeler, Robert Woolsey, Marjorie Lord	Musical comedy	RKO
On Such a Night	E. A. Dupont	Grant Richards, Karen Morley, Roscoe Karns	Crime	Paramount
On the Avenue	Roy Del Ruth	Dick Powell, Madeleine Carroll, Alice Faye	Musical comedy	20th Century Fox
Once a Doctor	William Clemens	Jean Muir, Donald Woods, Gordon Oliver	Drama	Warner Bros.
One Hundred Men and a Girl	Henry Koster	Deanna Durbin, Adolphe Menjou, Alice Brady	Musical comedy	Universal
One Man Justice	Leon Barsha	Charles Starrett, Barbara Weeks, Wally Wales	Western	Columbia
One Mile from Heaven	Allan Dwan	Claire Trevor, Fredi Washington, Sally Blane	Drama	20th Century Fox
Orphan of the Pecos	Sam Katzman	Tom Tyler, Theodore Lorch, Forrest Taylor	Western	Independent
Outcast	Robert Florey	Warren William, Karen Morley, Lewis Stone	Drama	Paramount
The Outcasts of Poker Flat	Christy Cabanne	Preston Foster, Virginia Weidler, Van Heflin	Western	RKO
The Outer Gate	Raymond Cannon	Ralph Morgan, Kay Linaker, Ben Alexander	Crime	Monogram
Outlaws of the Orient	Ernest B. Schoedsack	Jack Holt, Mae Clark, Harold Huber	Action adventure	Columbia
Outlaws of the Prairie	Sam Nelson	Charles Starrett, Iris Meredith, Dick Curtis	Western	Columbia
Over the Goal	Noel M. Smith	William Hopper, June Travis, Gordon Oliver	Sports	Warner Bros.
Paid to Dance	Charles C. Coleman	Don Terry, Jacqueline Wells, Rita Hayworth	Drama	Columbia
Paradise Express	Joseph Kane	Grant Withers, Dorothy Appleby, Arthur Hoyt	Drama	Republic
Paradise Isle	Arthur Greville Collins	Movita Castaneda, Warren Hull, William B. Davidson	Drama	Monogram
Park Avenue Logger	David Howard	George O'Brien, Beatrice Roberts, Ward Bond	Western	RKO
Parnell	John M. Stahl	Clark Gable, Myrna Loy, Alan Marshal	Drama, Biography	MGM
Parole Racket	Charles C. Coleman	Paul Kelly, Rosalind Keith, Thurston Hall	Crime	Columbia
Partners in Crime	Ralph Murphy	Lynne Overman, Roscoe Karns, Anthony Quinn	Crime	Paramount
Penrod and Sam	William C. McGann	Billy Mauch, Spring Byington, Frank Craven	Drama	Warner Bros.
The Perfect Specimen	Michael Curtiz	Errol Flynn, Joan Blondell, Hugh Herbert	Comedy	Warner Bros.
Personal Property	W. S. Van Dyke	Jean Harlow, Robert Taylor, Reginald Owen	Comedy	MGM
Pick a Star	Edward Sedgwick	Rosina Lawrence, Jack Haley, Lyda Roberti	Musical comedy	MGM
The Plough and the Stars	John Ford	Barbara Stanwyck, Preston Foster, Barry Fitzgerald	Drama	RKO
Portia on Trial	George Nicholls Jr.	Heather Angel, Neil Hamilton, Walter Abel	Drama	Republic
Prairie Thunder	B. Reeves Eason	Dick Foran, Frank Orth, Janet Shaw	Western	Warner Bros.
Prescription for Romance	S. Sylvan Simon	Wendy Barrie, Kent Taylor, Mischa Auer	Romantic comedy	Universal
The Prince and the Pauper	William Keighley	Errol Flynn, Claude Rains, Henry Stephenson	Adventure	Warner Bros.
The Prisoner of Zenda	John Cromwell, W. S. Van Dyke	Ronald Colman, Douglas Fairbanks Jr., Raymond Massey	Adventure	United Artists
Public Cowboy No. 1	Joseph Kane	Gene Autry, Ann Rutherford, Smiley Burnette	Western	Republic
Public Wedding	Nick Grinde	Jane Wyman, Dick Purcell, Marie Wilson	Comedy	Warner Bros.

== Q–R ==
Title	Director	Cast	Genre	Notes
Quality Street	George Stevens	Katharine Hepburn, Franchot Tone, Estelle Winwood	Comedy	RKO
Quick Money	Edward Killy	Fred Stone, Berton Churchill, Gordon Jones	Comedy	RKO
Racing Lady	Wallace Fox	Ann Dvorak, Smith Ballew, Harry Carey	Drama	RKO
Racketeers in Exile	Erle C. Kenton	George Bancroft, Evelyn Venable, Wynne Gibson	Crime	Columbia
Range Defenders	Mack V. Wright	Robert Livingston, Ray "Crash" Corrigan, Eleanor Stewart	Western	Republic
Ranger Courage	Spencer Gordon Bennet	Robert Allen, Walter Miller, Bud Osborne	Western	Columbia
The Rangers Step In	Spencer Gordon Bennet	Robert Allen, Eleanor Stewart, John Merton	Western	Columbia
Raw Timber	Howard Higgin	Tom Keene, Budd Buster, Robert Fiske	Western	Independent
Ready, Willing and Able	Ray Enright	Ruby Keeler, Wini Shaw, Carol Hughes	Musical comedy	Warner Bros.
Reckless Ranger	Spencer Gordon Bennet	Robert Allen, Jack Perrin, Mary MacLaren	Western	Columbia
The Red Rope	S. Roy Luby	Bob Steele, Lois January, Forrest Taylor	Western	Republic
Renfrew of the Royal Mounted	Albert Herman	James Newill, Carol Hughes, Kenneth Harlan	Western	Grand National
Reported Missing	Milton Carruth	William Gargan, Jean Rogers, Dick Purcell	Thriller	Universal
Rhythm in the Clouds	John H. Auer	Patricia Ellis, Warren Hull, William Newell	Musical	Republic
Rich Relations	Clifford Sanforth	Ralph Forbes, Frances Grant, Muriel Evans	Comedy	Independent
Riders of the Dawn	Robert N. Bradbury	Jack Randall, Warner Richmond, George Cooper	Western	Monogram
Riders of the Rockies	Robert North Bradbury	Tex Ritter, Louise Stanley, Horace Murphy	Western	Grand National
Riders of the Whistling Skull	Mack V. Wright	Bob Livingston, Ray "Crash" Corrigan, Mary Russell	Western	Republic
Ridin' the Lone Trail	Sam Newfield	Bob Steele, Claire Rochelle, Charles King	Western	Republic
Riding on Air	Edward Sedgwick	Joe E. Brown, Guy Kibbee, Florence Rice	Comedy	RKO
The Road Back	James Whale	Slim Summerville, Andy Devine, John Emery	Drama	Universal
The Roaming Cowboy	Robert F. Hill	Fred Scott, Al St. John, Lois January	Western	Independent
Roaring Six Guns	J. P. McGowan	Kermit Maynard, Sam Flint, John Merton	Western	Independent
Roaring Timber	Phil Rosen	Jack Holt, Grace Bradley, Ruth Donnelly	Drama	Columbia
Roll Along, Cowboy	Gus Meins	Smith Ballew, Cecilia Parker, Stanley Fields	Western	20th Century Fox
Romance of the Rockies	Robert North Bradbury	Tom Keene, Beryl Wallace, Franklyn Farnum	Western	Monogram
Rootin' Tootin' Rhythm	Mack V. Wright	Gene Autry, Monte Blue, Armida	Western	Republic
Rosalie	W. S. Van Dyke	Eleanor Powell, Nelson Eddy, Ray Bolger	Musical	MGM
Round-Up Time in Texas	Joseph Kane	Gene Autry, Maxine Doyle, Smiley Burnette	Western	Republic
Rustlers' Valley	Nate Watt	William Boyd, Muriel Evans, Lee J. Cobb	Western	Paramount

== S ==
Title	Director	Cast	Genre	Notes
Sandflow	Lesley Selander	Buck Jones, Lita Chevret, Bob Kortman	Western	Universal
San Quentin	Lloyd Bacon	Pat O'Brien, Humphrey Bogart, Ann Sheridan	Drama	Warner Bros.
Santa Fe Rides	Bernard B. Ray	Bob Custer, Eleanor Stewart, David Sharpe	Western	Independent
Saratoga	Jack Conway	Clark Gable, Jean Harlow, Lionel Barrymore	Comedy drama	MGM
Saturday's Heroes	Edward Killy	Van Heflin, Marian Marsh, Richard Lane	Sports	RKO
Sea Devils	Benjamin Stoloff	Victor McLaglen, Ida Lupino, Preston Foster	Action	RKO
Sea Racketeers	Hamilton MacFadden	Weldon Heyburn, Jeanne Madden, Penny Singleton	Crime	Republic
Second Honeymoon	Walter Lang	Loretta Young, Tyrone Power, Claire Trevor	Comedy	20th Century Fox
Secret Valley	Howard Bretherton	Richard Arlen, Virginia Grey, Jack Mulhall	Western	20th Century Fox
Seventh Heaven	Henry King	James Stewart, Simone Simon, Jean Hersholt	Romance	20th Century Fox
Sh! The Octopus	William C. McGann	Hugh Herbert, Allen Jenkins, Marcia Ralston	Mystery	Warner Bros.
The Shadow	Charles C. Coleman	Rita Hayworth, Charles Quigley, Marc Lawrence	Mystery	Columbia
The Shadow Strikes	Lynn Shores	Rod La Rocque, Walter McGrail, Bruce Kellogg	Mystery	Grand National
Shall We Dance	Mark Sandrich	Fred Astaire, Ginger Rogers, Edward Everett Horton	Musical comedy	RKO
She Asked for It	Erle C. Kenton	William Gargan, Vivienne Osborne, Richard Carle	Comedy	Paramount
She Had to Eat	Malcolm St. Clair	Rochelle Hudson, Jack Haley, Eugene Pallette	Comedy	20th Century Fox
She Loved a Fireman	John Farrow	Dick Foran, Ann Sheridan, Robert Armstrong	Drama	Warner Bros.
She Married an Artist	Marion Gering	John Boles, Luli Deste, Frances Drake	Comedy	Columbia
She's Dangerous	Lewis R. Foster	Tala Birell, Cesar Romero, Walter Pidgeon	Crime	Universal
She's Got Everything	Joseph Santley	Ann Sothern, Gene Raymond, Helen Broderick	Comedy	RKO
She's No Lady	Charles Vidor	Ann Dvorak, John Trent, Aileen Pringle	Comedy	Paramount
The Sheik Steps Out	Irving Pichel	Ramon Novarro, Lola Lane, Kathleen Burke	Musical	Republic
The Silver Trail	Bernard B. Ray	Rex Lease, Roger Williams, Slim Whitaker	Western	Independent
Sing and Be Happy	James Tinling	Tony Martin, Leah Ray, Joan Davis	Comedy	20th Century Fox
Sing, Cowboy, Sing	Robert N. Bradbury	Tex Ritter, Karl Hackett, Louise Stanley	Western	Grand National
Sing While You're Able	Marshall Neilan	Pinky Tomlin, Toby Wing, Suzanne Kaaren	Musical	Independent
The Singing Buckaroo	Tom Gibson	Fred Scott, Victoria Vinton, William Faversham	Western	Independent
The Singing Marine	Ray Enright, Busby Berkeley	Dick Powell, Doris Weston, Lee Dixon	Musical	Warner Bros.
Sky Racket	Sam Katzman	Bruce Bennett, Monte Blue, Hattie McDaniel	Science fiction	Independent
Slave Ship	Tay Garnett	Wallace Beery, Warner Baxter, Mickey Rooney	Adventure	20th Century Fox
Slaves in Bondage	Elmer Clifton	Lona Andre, Wheeler Oakman, Donald Reed	Exploitation	Independent
Slim	Ray Enright	Henry Fonda, Pat O'Brien, Margaret Lindsay	Drama	Warner Bros.
Small Town Boy	Glenn Tryon	Stuart Erwin, Joyce Compton, Dorothy Appleby	Comedy	Grand National
Smart Blonde	Frank McDonald	Glenda Farrell, Barton MacLane, Winifred Shaw, Addison Richards	Comedy/Mystery	Warner Bros.
Smashing the Vice Trust	Melville Shyer	Willy Castello, Veola Vonn, Selmer Jackson	Crime	Independent
Smoke Tree Range	Lesley Selander	Buck Jones, Muriel Evans, John Elliott	Western	Universal
Snow White and the Seven Dwarfs	David Hand	Adriana Caselotti, Roy Atwell, Billy Gilbert	Animated	Disney, RKO
The Soldier and the Lady	George Nicholls Jr.	Anton Walbrook, Elizabeth Allan, Akim Tamiroff	Adventure	RKO
Some Blondes Are Dangerous	Milton Carruth	Noah Beery Jr., Nan Grey, Dorothea Kent	Drama	Universal
Something to Sing About	Victor Schertzinger	James Cagney, Evelyn Daw, Mona Barrie	Musical comedy	Grand National
Song of the City	Errol Taggart	Margaret Lindsay, Dean Jagger, Nat Pendleton	Musical	MGM
Sophie Lang Goes West	Charles Reisner	Gertrude Michael, Lee Bowman, Sandra Storme	Crime	Paramount
Souls at Sea	Henry Hathaway	Gary Cooper, George Raft, Robert Cummings	Adventure	Paramount
Special Agent K-7	Raymond K. Johnson	Walter McGrail, Queenie Smith, Irving Pichel	Mystery	Independent
Speed to Spare	Lambert Hillyer	Charles Quigley, Dorothy Wilson, Patricia Farr	Drama	Columbia
Springtime in the Rockies	Joseph Kane	Gene Autry, Smiley Burnette, Polly Rowles	Western	Republic
Stage Door	Gregory La Cava	Katharine Hepburn, Ginger Rogers, Adolphe Menjou	Drama	RKO
Stand-In	Tay Garnett	Leslie Howard, Humphrey Bogart, Joan Blondell	Comedy	United Artists
A Star Is Born	William A. Wellman	Fredric March, Janet Gaynor, Adolphe Menjou	Drama	United Artists
Stars Over Arizona	Robert North Bradbury	Jack Randall, Horace Murphy, Warner Richmond	Western	Monogram
Stella Dallas	King Vidor	Barbara Stanwyck, John Boles, Alan Hale	Drama	United Artists
Step Lively, Jeeves!	Eugene Forde	Arthur Treacher, Patricia Ellis, Robert Kent	Comedy	20th Century Fox
Stolen Holiday	Michael Curtiz	Kay Francis, Claude Rains, Ian Hunter	Drama	Warner Bros.
Submarine D-1	Lloyd Bacon	Pat O'Brien, George Brent, Wayne Morris	Drama	Warner Bros.
Sudden Bill Dorn	Ray Taylor	Buck Jones, Noel Francis, Evelyn Brent	Western	Universal
Super-Sleuth	Benjamin Stoloff	Jack Oakie, Ann Sothern, Eduardo Ciannelli	Comedy	RKO
Sweetheart of the Navy	Duncan Mansfield	Eric Linden, Cecilia Parker, Roger Imhof	Comedy	Grand National
Swing High, Swing Low	Mitchell Leisen	Dorothy Lamour, Carole Lombard, Fred MacMurray	Comedy drama	Paramount
Swing It, Professor	Marshall Neilan	Pinky Tomlin, Paula Stone, Milburn Stone	Musical	Independent

== T ==
Title	Director	Cast	Genre	Notes
Talent Scout	William Clemens	Donald Woods, Jeanne Madden, Rosalind Marquis	Drama	Warner Bros.
Telephone Operator	Scott Pembroke	Judith Allen, Alice White, Pat Flaherty	Drama, Action	Monogram
Tex Rides with the Boy Scouts	Ray Taylor	Tex Ritter, Marjorie Reynolds, Forrest Taylor	Western	Grand National
Texas Trail	David Selman	William Boyd, Russell Hayden, Judith Allen	Western	Paramount
Thank You, Mr. Moto	Norman Foster	Peter Lorre, Thomas Beck, Pauline Frederick	Mystery	20th Century Fox
Thanks for Listening	Marshall Neilan	Pinky Tomlin, Maxine Doyle, Claire Rochelle	Comedy	Independent
That Certain Woman	Edmund Goulding	Bette Davis, Henry Fonda, Anita Louise	Drama	Warner Bros.
That Girl from Paris	Leigh Jason	Lily Pons, Jack Oakie, Gene Raymond	Comedy	RKO
That I May Live	Allan Dwan	Rochelle Hudson, Robert Kent, Jack La Rue	Crime	20th Century Fox
That Man's Here Again	Louis King	Hugh Herbert, Mary Maguire, Tom Brown	Comedy	Warner Bros.
That Navy Spirit	Kurt Neumann	Lew Ayres, Mary Carlisle, John Howard	Sports	Paramount
That's My Story	Sidney Salkow	William Lundigan, Claudia Morgan, Herbert Mundin	Drama	Universal
There Goes My Girl	Ben Holmes	Ann Sothern, Gene Raymond, Richard Lane	Comedy	RKO
There Goes the Groom	Joseph Santley	Ann Sothern, Burgess Meredith, Mary Boland	Comedy	RKO
They Gave Him a Gun	W. S. Van Dyke	Spencer Tracy, Gladys George, Franchot Tone	Drama	MGM
They Wanted to Marry	Lew Landers	Betty Furness, Gordon Jones, Henry Kolker	Romantic comedy	RKO
They Won't Forget	Mervyn LeRoy	Claude Rains, Lana Turner, Otto Kruger	Drama	Warner Bros.
Thin Ice	Sidney Lanfield	Tyrone Power, Sonja Henie, Arthur Treacher	Romantic comedy	20th Century Fox
Think Fast, Mr. Moto	Norman Foster	Peter Lorre, Virginia Field, Thomas Beck	Mystery	20th Century Fox
The Thirteenth Chair	George B. Seitz	Dame May Whitty, Lewis Stone, Elissa Landi	Mystery	MGM
This Is My Affair	William A. Seiter	Robert Taylor, Barbara Stanwyck, Brian Donlevy	Drama	20th Century Fox
This Way Please	Robert Florey	Betty Grable, Charles Rogers, Porter Hall	Musical comedy	Paramount
Thoroughbreds Don't Cry	Alfred E. Green	Mickey Rooney, Judy Garland, C. Aubrey Smith	Musical comedy	MGM
Three Legionnaires	Hamilton MacFadden	Robert Armstrong, Lyle Talbot, Fifi D'Orsay	Comedy	Independent
Thrill of a Lifetime	George Archainbaud	James V. Kern, Judy Canova, Eleanore Whitney	Comedy	Paramount
Thunder Trail	Charles Barton	Gilbert Roland, Charles Bickford, Marsha Hunt	Western	Paramount
Time Out for Romance	Malcolm St. Clair	Claire Trevor, Michael Whalen, Joan Davis	Comedy	20th Century Fox
The Toast of New York	Rowland V. Lee	Cary Grant, Frances Farmer, Edward Arnold	Drama	RKO
Too Many Wives	Ben Holmes	Anne Shirley, Barbara Pepper, Gene Lockhart	Comedy	RKO
Top of the Town	Ralph Murphy	Doris Nolan, George Murphy, Ella Logan	Comedy	Universal
Topper	Norman Z. McLeod	Constance Bennett, Roland Young, Cary Grant	Comedy	MGM
Tough to Handle	S. Roy Luby	Frankie Darro, Kane Richmond, Phyllis Cerf	Action	Independent
Tovarich	Anatole Litvak	Claudette Colbert, Charles Boyer, Basil Rathbone	Comedy	Warner Bros.
Trail of Vengeance	Sam Newfield	Johnny Mack Brown, Iris Meredith, Warner Richmond	Western	Republic
Trailin' Trouble	Arthur Rosson	Ken Maynard, Lona Andre, Roger Williams	Western	Grand National
Trapped	Leon Barsha	Charles Starrett, Robert Middlemass, Lew Meehan	Western	Columbia
Trapped by G-Men	Lewis D. Collins	Jack Holt, Wynne Gibson, Jack La Rue	Crime	Columbia
The Trigger Trio	William Witney	Ray Corrigan, Max Terhune, Ralph Byrd	Western	Republic
Trouble at Midnight	Ford Beebe	Noah Beery Jr., Kay Hughes, Larry J. Blake	Action	Universal
Trouble in Morocco	Ernest B. Schoedsack	Jack Holt, Mae Clarke, Paul Hurst	Adventure	Columbia
Trouble in Texas	Robert N. Bradbury	Tex Ritter, Rita Hayworth, Yakima Canutt	Western	Grand National
True Confession	Wesley Ruggles	Carole Lombard, Fred MacMurray, John Barrymore	Comedy	Paramount
The Trusted Outlaw	Robert N. Bradbury	Bob Steele, Lois January, Joan Barclay	Western	Republic
Turn Off the Moon	Lewis Seiler	Charlie Ruggles, Eleanore Whitney, Johnny Downs	Comedy	Paramount
Two-Fisted Sheriff	Leon Barsha	Charles Starrett, Barbara Weeks, Allan Sears	Western	Columbia
Two Gun Law	Leon Barsha	Charles Starrett, Hank Bell, Charles Middleton	Western	Columbia
Two Wise Maids	Phil Rosen	Alison Skipworth, Peggy Moran, Donald Cook	Drama	Republic

== U–V ==
Title	Director	Cast	Genre	Notes
Under Cover of Night	George B. Seitz	Edmund Lowe, Florence Rice, Henry Daniell	Mystery	MGM
Under the Red Robe	Victor Sjostrom	Conrad Veidt, Raymond Massey, Annabella	Adventure	20th Century Fox
Under Strange Flags	Irvin Willat	Tom Keene, Luana Walters, Maurice Black	Western	Independent
Under Suspicion	Lewis D. Collins	Jack Holt, Katherine DeMille, Luis Alberni	Mystery	Columbia
Valley of Terror	Albert Herman	Kermit Maynard, Harley Wood, John Merton	Western	Independent
Varsity Show	William Keighley	Dick Powell, Priscilla Lane, Rosemary Lane	Musical	Warner Bros.
Venus Makes Trouble	Gordon Wiles	James Dunn, Patricia Ellis, Astrid Allwyn	Comedy	Columbia
Vogues of 1938	Irving Cummings	Warner Baxter, Joan Bennett, Helen Vinson	Musical	United Artists

== W–Z ==
Title	Director	Cast	Genre	Notes
Waikiki Wedding	Frank Tuttle	Bing Crosby, Martha Raye, Shirley Ross	Musical comedy	Paramount
Wake Up and Live	Sidney Lanfield	Patsy Kelly, Ben Bernie, Walter Winchell	Musical comedy	20th Century Fox
Wallaby Jim of the Islands	Charles Lamont	George F. Houston, Douglas Walton, Wilhelm von Brincken	Adventure	Grand National
Way Out West	James W. Horne	Stan Laurel, Oliver Hardy, James Finlayson	Comedy	MGM
We Have Our Moments	Alfred L. Werker	Sally Eilers, James Dunn, David Niven	Comedy	Universal
We Who Are About to Die	Christy Cabanne	Ann Dvorak, Preston Foster, Willie Fung	Drama, Crime	RKO
Wee Willie Winkie	John Ford	Shirley Temple, Victor McLaglen, C. Aubrey Smith	Adventure	20th Century Fox
We're on the Jury	Ben Holmes	Victor Moore, Helen Broderick, Charles Lane	Comedy	RKO
Wells Fargo	Frank Lloyd	Joel McCrea, Frances Dee, Porter Hall	Western	Paramount
Westbound Mail	Folmar Blangsted	Charles Starrett, Rosalind Keith, Edward Keane	Western	Columbia
West Bound Limited	Ford Beebe	Lyle Talbot, Polly Rowles, Frank Reicher	Action	Universal
West of Shanghai	John Farrow, Crane Wilbur	Boris Karloff, Ricardo Cortez, Beverly Roberts	Adventure	Warner Bros.
Western Gold	Howard Bretherton	Smith Ballew, Heather Angel, LeRoy Mason	Western	20th Century Fox
The Westland Case	Christy Cabanne	Preston Foster, Frank Jenks, Carol Hughes	Mystery	Universal
What Price Vengeance	Del Lord	Lyle Talbot, Wendy Barrie, Marc Lawrence	Crime	Independent
When Love Is Young	Hal Mohr	Virginia Bruce, Kent Taylor, Walter Brennan	Comedy	Universal
When You're in Love	Harry Lachman, Robert Riskin	Cary Grant, Grace Moore, Aline MacMahon	Romantic Comedy	Columbia
When's Your Birthday?	Harry Beaumont	Joe E. Brown, Marian Marsh, Edgar Kennedy	Comedy	RKO
Where Trails Divide	Robert N. Bradbury	Tom Keene, Warner Richmond, Eleanor Stewart	Western	Monogram
Whistling Bullets	John English	Kermit Maynard, Harley Wood, Maston Williams	Western	Independent
White Bondage	Nick Grinde	Jean Muir, Gordon Oliver, Harry Davenport	Drama	Warner Bros.
Wife, Doctor and Nurse	Walter Lang	Loretta Young, Warner Baxter, Virginia Bruce	Comedy	20th Century Fox
Wild and Woolly	Alfred L. Werker	Jane Withers, Walter Brennan, Lon Chaney Jr.	Western comedy	20th Century Fox
Wild Horse Rodeo	George Sherman	Robert Livingston, June Martel, Ray "Crash" Corrigan	Western	Republic
Wild Money	Louis King	Edward Everett Horton, Louise Campbell, Lynne Overman	Comedy	Paramount
The Wildcatter	Lewis D. Collins	Scott Kolk, Jean Rogers, Suzanne Kaaren	Drama	Universal
Windjammer	Ewing Scott	George O'Brien, Constance Worth, William Hall	Adventure	RKO
Wine, Women and Horses	James Van Trees, Louis King	Ann Sheridan, Barton MacLane, Walter Cassel	Drama	Warner Bros.
Wings over Honolulu	H. C. Potter	Wendy Barrie, Ray Milland, William Gargan	Military Romance	Universal
Wise Girl	Leigh Jason	Miriam Hopkins, Ray Milland, Guinn Williams	Comedy	RKO
Woman Against the World	David Selman	Collette Lyons, Ralph Forbes, Edgar Evans	Drama	Columbia
Woman Chases Man	John G. Blystone	Charles Winninger, Miriam Hopkins, Joel McCrea	Comedy	United Artists
The Woman I Love	Anatole Litvak	Paul Muni, Miriam Hopkins, Louis Hayward	War drama	RKO
Woman in Distress	Lynn Shores	May Robson, Irene Hervey, Dean Jagger	Crime	Columbia
Woman-Wise	Allan Dwan	Rochelle Hudson, Michael Whalen, Alan Dinehart	Crime	20th Century Fox
The Women Men Marry	Errol Taggart	George Murphy, Josephine Hutchinson, Claire Dodd	Drama	MGM
Women of Glamour	Gordon Wiles	Virginia Bruce, Melvyn Douglas, Reginald Denny	Comedy	Columbia
The Wrong Road	James Cruze	Richard Cromwell, Helen Mack, Lionel Atwill	Drama	Republic
Yodelin' Kid from Pine Ridge	Joseph Kane	Gene Autry, Betty Bronson, Smiley Burnette	Western	Republic
You Can't Beat Love	Christy Cabanne	Preston Foster, Joan Fontaine, Herbert Mundin	Romantic Comedy	RKO
You Can't Buy Luck	Lew Landers	Onslow Stevens, Helen Mack, Vinton Hayworth	Mystery	RKO
You Can't Have Everything	Norman Taurog	Alice Faye, Gypsy Rose Lee, The Ritz Brothers	Musical Comedy	20th Century Fox
You Only Live Once	Fritz Lang	Sylvia Sidney, Henry Fonda, Barton MacLane	Drama	United Artists
You're a Sweetheart	David Butler	Alice Faye, George Murphy, Charles Winninger	Musical	Universal
You're Only Young Once	George B. Seitz	Mickey Rooney, Lewis Stone, Cecilia Parker	Comedy	MGM
Young Dynamite	Leslie Goodwins	Frankie Darro, Kane Richmond, Charlotte Henry	Crime	Independent
Youth on Parole	Phil Rosen	Marian Marsh, Gordon Oliver, Margaret Dumont	Crime drama	Republic

== Documentaries ==
Title	Director	Cast	Genre	Notes
Borneo	Truman H. Talley	Lowell Thomas, Martin E. Johnson	Documentary	20th Century Fox

== Serials ==
Title	Director	Cast	Genre	Notes
Jungle Menace	Harry L. Fraser	Frank Buck	Serial	Columbia

== Short films ==
Title	Director	Cast	Genre	Notes
3 Dumb Clucks	Del Lord	Moe Howard, Larry Fine, Curly Howard	Comedy 2-reeler	Columbia

== See also ==
- 1937 in the United States
