= Double agent (disambiguation) =

A double agent is a spy for one party who poses as a spy for the other.

Double agent may also refer to:

- "Double Agent" (Joe 90)
- Tom Clancy's Splinter Cell: Double Agent, a 2006 video game
- Double Agent, a novel by Gene Stackleborg, basis of movie The Man Outside (1967 film)
- Double Agent (1987 film), a television film
- Double Agent (2003 film), a South Korean film
- Yuri Nosenko: Double Agent, a 1986 TV movie about Yuri Nosenko
- The Challenge: Double Agents, season 36 of the MTV reality competition show
- "Double Agent", a 2021 song from the Van Morrison album Latest Record Project, Volume 1
