= Without Honor =

Without Honor may refer to:

- Without Honor (1918 film), an American film directed by E. Mason Hopper
- Without Honor (1932 film), an American film directed by William Nigh
- He Was Her Man aka Without Honor, a 1934 American film directed by Lloyd Bacon
- Without Honor (1949 film), an American film directed by Irving Pichel
