= Susan Walden =

American film and television actress

- Occupations: Television and film actress
- Years active: 1973–2001

Susan Walden (August 20, 1956 – August 17, 2020) was an American film and television actress.

== Early years ==
Born in Georgia, Walden was the daughter of Buddy and Bette Walden. She began acting while she was a student at Tate High School. Before she graduated from Tate she won school recognition for beauty and academics. In 1974 she won the Miss Escambia County Junior Miss title and was runner-up for America's Junior Miss. She was an honor graduate of the University of Southern California, where she was a member of Phi Beta Kappa.

== Career ==
She started her career on The Young and the Restless in the early 1970s, and was best known for her role as J.L. Duval on the hit Canadian TV Show Danger Bay (1984–90). In 1980, she starred in the TV mini series The Contender, on which she played Lucinda Waverly.

During the 1980s, Walden appeared on many TV shows on various American networks, including The Dukes of Hazzard, MacGyver, Matlock, Three's Company, T.J. Hooker, etc.

In 1987, she appeared in The Disney Sunday Movie titled Double Agent (1987), featuring Michael McKean, Lloyd Bochner, and John Putch. Double Agent was first telecast on March 29, 1987. She continued to act until 2001. Her last role was on the television series Titus.

== Death ==
She died on August 17, 2020, at age 63, at her home in Pensacola, Florida.

== Awards ==
She was nominated for a Gemini Award (Best Performance by a Lead Actress in a Continuing Dramatic Series) for Danger Bay in 1986.

== Filmography ==
- Winter Kills (1979)
- A Matter of the Heart (1982)
- Double Agent (1987)
- Deep Dark Secrets (1987)
- Taking Back My Life: The Nancy Ziegenmeyer Story (1992)
