= The Red Rope =

1937 film by S. Roy Luby

- Directed by: S. Roy Luby
- Screenplay by: George H. Plympton
- Story by: Johnston McCulley
- Produced by: A. W. Hackel
- Starring: Bob Steele; Lois January; Forrest Taylor; Charles King; Karl Hackett; Bobby Nelson
- Cinematography: Bert Longenecker
- Edited by: S. Roy Luby
- Production company: Supreme Pictures
- Distributed by: Republic Pictures
- Release date: July 19, 1937
- Running time: 59 minutes
- Country: United States
- Language: English

The Red Rope is a 1937 American Western film directed by S. Roy Luby and written by George H. Plympton. The film stars Bob Steele, Lois January, Forrest Taylor, Charles King, Karl Hackett and Bobby Nelson. The film was released on July 19, 1937, by Republic Pictures.

== Plot ==
Tom Shaw’s plans to marry Betty Duncan encounter a hitch when known outlaw Rattler Haynes threatens the property and doesn’t allow the wedding guests to attend. With the help of his friends and some unexpected allies, will Tom be able to wed his love and bring peace to the frontier?

== Cast ==
- Bob Steele as Tom Shaw
- Lois January as Betty Duncan
- Forrest Taylor as Parson Pete
- Charles King as Red Mike
- Karl Hackett as Grant Brade
- Bobby Nelson as Jimmy Duncan
- Ed Cassidy as Logan
- Lew Meehan as Rattler Haynes
- Frank Ball as John Duncan
- Jack Rockwell as Dotkins
- Horace Murphy as Horner

== Critical reception ==
Variety defined the film as a "cactus opera" and gave a positive review, writing that it "possesses more action and plot" that most of its type. Praise was given for the quality of the photography in capturing the "superb horsemanship". The reviewer stated that it was in these action scenes that the star, Bob Steele, "shines most ... because dialogue does not help much and he is no word twister."
