= Let There Be Peace on Earth =

1955 song by Jackson-Miller and Miller

Song by Jill Jackson-Miller and Sy Miller
- Language: English
- Written: 1955
- Released: 1955
- Genre: Hymn, Christmas song
- Composer: Sy Miller
- Lyricist: Jill Jackson-Miller

"Let There Be Peace on Earth" is a song written by Jill Jackson-Miller and Sy Miller in 1955. It was initially written for and sung by the International Children's Choir created by Easter Beakly and Arthur Granger of the Granger Dance Academy in Long Beach, California. The composers led a number of rehearsals for the children's choir from 1955 to 1957, and the song is still the theme for this group of children who represent a host of nations and who sang in Washington, D.C., at the JW Marriott next to the White House in 2002.

Jackson-Miller, who had been suicidal after the failure of her marriage to screenwriter Felix Jackson, later said she wrote the song after discovering what she called "the life-saving joy of God's peace and unconditional love".

== Overview ==
The song is performed worldwide throughout the year, and particularly during the Christmas season, which has led to it being considered a Christmas song. It is included in the hymnals of a variety of Christian denominations, and is used in worship services even by a number of denominations that do not include it in their hymnals. It typically concludes Unity Church services each week.

The original lyrics for "Let There Be Peace on Earth" have been altered on many occasions for differing reasons, including for gender neutrality (where "father" is replaced with "creator", and "brother" is replaced with "family" or "each other"), and secularity (where "God as our Father" is replaced with "Earth as our Mother" or "love as our compass"). Both the gender-neutral and secular alternate lyrics have been copyrighted by the original licensing agent of the song.

== Covers and performances ==
In 1959, Pat Boone performed "Let There Be Peace on Earth" with Johnny Mathis on The Pat Boone show.

In 1967, Mahalia Jackson sang "Let There Be Peace on Earth" at her concert in Berlin.

On November 7, 1988, it was performed by the GMA Stars and Personalities along with a small group of children with lighted candles in honor of the Launching of GMA-7's 777-foot Tower of Power in Tandang Sora, Quezon City, the tallest man-made structure in the country used for the Towering Power: A Musical Dedication and as part of Christmas song.

In 1993, the song was covered by American country music singer Vince Gill and his daughter Jenny, as the title single for his platinum-selling Christmas album.

The song was performed by Randy Santiago, John Estrada and Willie Revillame during closing number of the ABS-CBN Worldwide Celebration of the New Millennium at the Quirino Grandstand.

It is the final song during the holidays each year during the "IllumiNations: Reflections of Earth" firework show at Epcot at the Walt Disney World Resort in Florida. It previously featured narration by Walter Cronkite and singing by Sandi Patti and the Harlem Boys Choir.

The song was performed by the Young People's Chorus of New York City on September 25, 2015, at the close of the Interfaith Prayer Service and Remembrance, presided over by Pope Francis, at Ground Zero in New York.

In 2017, Carlos Santana and Ernie/Ronnie Isley released the song on their Power of Peace album (Sony Music's Legacy Recordings).

During the 2015 Christmas and holiday season, American technology company Microsoft got dislikes and criticism on YouTube when it released an advertisement featuring a cover by employees and a New York City children's choir that skipped over the verse "With God as our Father, brothers all are we / Let me walk with my brother, in perfect harmony". In response, the company released a second, longer version that included the omitted verse.

In 2020, Ricky Dillard released "Let There Be Peace On Earth" as the 4th track on his 11th album, Choirmaster.
