= The Overland Express =

1938 film by Drew Eberson

- Theatrical release poster
- Directed by: Drew Eberson
- Screenplay by: Monroe Shaff
- Produced by: L.G. Leonard
- Starring: Buck Jones; Marjorie Reynolds; Carlyle Moore Jr. Maston Williams; William Arnold; Lew Kelly
- Cinematography: Allen Q. Thompson
- Edited by: Gene Milford
- Production company: Columbia Pictures
- Distributed by: Columbia Pictures
- Release date: April 11, 1938
- Running time: 55 minutes
- Country: United States
- Language: English

The Overland Express is a 1938 American Western film directed by Drew Eberson and written by Monroe Shaff. The film stars Buck Jones, Marjorie Reynolds, Carlyle Moore Jr., Maston Williams, William Arnold and Lew Kelly. The film was released on April 11, 1938, by Columbia Pictures.

== Cast ==
- Buck Jones as Buck Dawson
- Marjorie Reynolds as Jean Greeley
- Carlyle Moore Jr. as Tom Furness
- Maston Williams as Bill Hawley
- William Arnold as Henry Furness
- Lew Kelly as Fred Greeley
- Bud Osborne as Overland Wilson
- Ben Taggart as Adams
