= Murder in Greenwich Village =

1937 film by Albert S. Rogell

- Directed by: Albert S. Rogell
- Screenplay by: Michael L. Simmons
- Story by: Robert T. Shannons
- Produced by: Wallace MacDonald
- Starring: Richard Arlen; Fay Wray; Raymond Walburn
- Cinematography: Henry Freulich
- Edited by: Richard Fantl
- Color process: Black and white
- Production company: Columbia Pictures
- Distributed by: Columbia Pictures
- Release date: November 3, 1937
- Running time: 68 minutes
- Country: United States
- Language: English

Murder in Greenwich Village is a 1937 American mystery film directed by Albert S. Rogell and starring Richard Arlen, Fay Wray and Raymond Walburn. The screenplay involves an heiress who is falsely accused of murder. The film's sets were designed by the art directors Lionel Banks and Stephen Goosson.

== Plot ==
When she is falsely accused of murder, an heiress ropes in a photographer to provide her with an alibi.

== Cast ==
- Richard Arlen as Steve Havens Jackson Jr.
- Fay Wray as Kay Cabot aka Lucky
- Raymond Walburn as The Senator
- Wyn Cahoon as Flo Melville
- Scott Kolk as Larry Foster (as Scott Kolton)
- Thurston Hall as Charles Cabot
- Marc Lawrence as Rusty Morgan
- Gene Morgan as Henderson
- Mary Russell as Antoinette aka Angel Annie McGillicutty
- George McKay as Officer
- Leon Ames as Rodney Hunter
- Barry Macollum as Murphy
- Marjorie Reynolds as Molly Murphy

== See also ==
- List of American films of 1937
