= Rogue of the Range =

1936 film

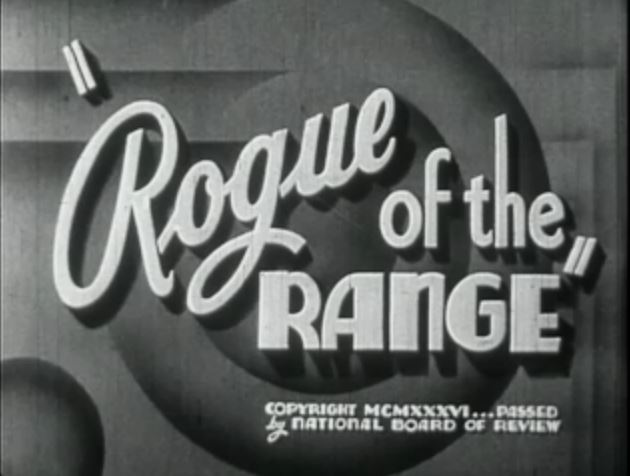
- Title card
- Directed by: S. Roy Luby
- Written by: Earle Snell (adaptation); Earle Snell (story)
- Produced by: A. W. Hackel
- Starring: Johnny Mack Brown; Lois January
- Cinematography: Jack Greenhalgh
- Edited by: S. Roy Luby
- Distributed by: Supreme Pictures
- Release date: April 25, 1936
- Running time: 58 minutes
- Country: United States
- Language: English

Rogue of the Range is a 1936 American Western film directed by S. Roy Luby and starring Johnny Mack Brown, Lois January and in her only film, Phyllis Hume, Miss California 1936 and first runner-up for Miss America, where she used the name Phyllis Dobson. The film is also known as Spider and the Fly in the United Kingdom.

== Plot ==
Dan Doran robs a stagecoach before a gang of robbers do, then meets a woman driving a runaway wagon with her father dead in the back of it. Doran is caught and sent to prison for 20 years, but he breaks out with a fellow prisoner and joins a robbery gang in the same area where he came from.

== Cast ==
- Johnny Mack Brown as Dan Doran
- Lois January as Stella Lamb
- Stephen Chase as Lige Branscomb
- Phyllis Hume as Tess
- George Ball as Jim Mitchell
- Jack Rockwell as Henchman Sloan
- Horace Murphy as Sheriff Tom
- Frank Ball as John (express agent)
- Oscar Gahan as Stage guard

== Reception ==
In a very brief review, TV Guide found that "Brown poses as an outlaw but is really a lawman in this below-par programmer".
