= Border Phantom =

1937 film by S. Roy Luby

- DVD box illustration
- Directed by: S. Roy Luby
- Written by: Fred Myton
- Produced by: A. W. Hackel
- Starring: Bob Steele; Harley Wood; Don Barclay; Karl Hackett; Horace Murphy; Miki Morita
- Cinematography: Jack Greenhalgh
- Edited by: S. Roy Luby
- Production company: Supreme Pictures Corporation
- Distributed by: Republic Pictures
- Release date: June 7, 1937
- Running time: 60 minutes
- Country: United States
- Language: English

Border Phantom is a 1937 American Western film directed by S. Roy Luby and written by Fred Myton. The film stars Bob Steele, Harley Wood, Don Barclay, Karl Hackett, Horace Murphy, and Miki Morita. The film was released on June 7, 1937, by Republic Pictures.

== Plot ==
Barbara Hartwell is about to be arrested for the murder of her uncle. While she is arrested, Larry O'Day and his sidekick Lucky Smith go on a journey to find the real murderer that involves people smuggling of Chinese women.

== Cast ==
- Bob Steele as Larry O'Day
- Harley Wood as Barbara Hartwell
- Don Barclay as Lucky Smith
- Karl Hackett as Obed Young
- Horace Murphy as Sheriff
- Miki Morita as Chan Lee
- Perry Murdock as Jim Barton
- John S. Peters as Dr. Von Kurtz
- Frank Ball as Professor Andrew Hartwell
