= Border Caballero =

1936 film by Sam Newfield

- Theatrical release poster
- Directed by: Sam Newfield
- Written by: Norman S. Hall (story); Joseph O'Donnell (continuity)
- Produced by: Sigmund Neufeld; Leslie Simmonds
- Starring: See below
- Cinematography: Jack Greenhalgh
- Edited by: Holbrook N. Todd
- Distributed by: Puritan Pictures
- Release date: March 1, 1936
- Running time: 59 minutes
- Country: United States
- Language: English

Border Caballero is a 1936 American Western film starring Tim McCoy. It was directed by Sam Newfield.

== Plot ==
Undercover lawman Tim Ross is working his way across the country as a sharpshooter in a medicine show. He runs into a former colleague working undercover to stop a series of bank robberies. When his friend is killed, Tim takes his place.

== Cast ==
- Tim McCoy as Tim Ross
- Lois January as Goldie Harris
- Ralph Byrd as Tex Weaver
- J. Frank Glendon as Wiley Taggart
- Ted Adams as Buff Brayden
- John Merton as Runnyian
- Earle Hodgins as Doc Shaw
