= Miki Morita =

Japanese actor

- Born: Mitsugi Morita; October 1, 1896; Ueda, Nagano Prefecture, Japan
- Died: December 3, 1985; Fresno, California, US
- Occupation: Actor

Mitsugi "Miki" Morita (sometimes credited as Mike Morita) was a Japanese character actor who worked in Hollywood from the 1920s through around 1940. He had worked as a stage actor before beginning his career onscreen.

== Partial filmography ==
- Souls for Sables (1925)
- Broadway Lady (1925)
- Telling the World (1928)
- Shanghai Express (1932)
- War Correspondent (1932)
- They Call It Sin (1932)
- Renegades of the West (1932)
- Nagana (1933)
- Girl Missing (1933)
- Christopher Strong (1933)
- Midnight Mary (1933)
- Bombshell (1933)
- The Captain Hates the Sea (1934)
- Behold My Wife! (1934)
- Death Flies East (1935)
- The Casino Murder Case (1935)
- Oil for the Lamps of China (1935)
- Grand Exit (1935)
- Front Page Woman (1935)
- The Dark Hour (1936)
- The Walking Dead (1936)
- Spendthrift (1936)
- It Couldn't Have Happened – But It Did (1936)
- Isle of Fury (1936)
- North of Nome (1936)
- Women of Glamour (1937)
- Border Phantom (1937)
- Wild West Days (1937)
- It Happened in Hollywood (1937)
- She Asked for It (1937)
- The Awful Truth (1937)
- Bulldog Drummond's Revenge (1937)
- The House Across the Bay (1940)
- Turnabout (1940)
