= Arizona Bad Man =

1935 film

- Directed by: S. Roy Luby
- Written by: Oliver Drake; Eric Howard
- Produced by: Willis Kent
- Starring: Reb Russell; Lois January; Edmund Cobb
- Cinematography: James S. Brown Jr.
- Edited by: S. Roy Luby
- Production company: Willis Kent Productions
- Distributed by: Willis Kent Productions
- Release date: February 1, 1935
- Running time: 58 minutes
- Country: United States
- Language: English

Arizona Bad Man is a 1935 American Western film directed by S. Roy Luby and starring Reb Russell, Lois January and Edmund Cobb.

== Cast ==
- Reb Russell as Steve Donovan
- Lois January as Lucy Dunston
- Slim Whitaker as Black Bart Dunston
- Edmund Cobb as Sonny Karns - Gunman
- Dick Botiller as Pedro Gonzales - Bart's Henchman
- Tommy Bupp as Dave Dunston
- Anne Howard as Min - Middle-Aged Dancer
- Walter James as Jack - Bartender
- Fay McKenzie as Girl at Barn Dance

== Bibliography ==
- Rainey, Buck. Sweethearts of the Sage: Biographies and Filmographies of 258 actresses appearing in Western movies. McFarland & Company, 1992.
