= Grand Exit =

1935 film by Erle C. Kenton

- Directed by: Erle C. Kenton
- Screenplay by: Bruce Manning and Lionel Houser
- Based on: Story by Gene Towne and Graham Baker
- Starring: Edmund Lowe and Ann Sothern
- Cinematography: Henry Freulich, A. S. C.
- Edited by: Gene Milford
- Production company: Columbia Pictures Corporation
- Distributed by: Columbia Pictures Corporation
- Release date: October 25, 1935
- Running time: 67, 68 or 70 minutes
- Country: United States
- Language: English

Grand Exit is a 1935 American detective mystery film with comedy elements, directed for Columbia Pictures by Erle C. Kenton, with screenplay by Bruce Manning and Lionel Houser, based on a story by Gene Towne and Graham Baker. The leads, in their second film together, are Edmund Lowe and Ann Sothern, with supporting players Onslow Stevens, Robert Middlemass and Wyrley Birch.

== Plot ==
The story revolves around a series of suspicious fires that have been plaguing the Interoceanic Fire Insurance Company. The main character, Tom Fletcher, is a former investigator for the company who was fired under questionable circumstances. However, due to the escalating fire incidents, the company's board of directors is forced to bring Fletcher back to solve the case.

Fletcher sets his demands high, requesting various perks and a hefty bonus for catching the arsonist. He begins his investigation by assembling a team of trusted individuals, including his new secretary, Miss Appleby. Fletcher meets a mysterious woman named Adrienne Martin, who has been present at several fire scenes. He becomes suspicious of her and starts to suspect her involvement in the fires.

As Fletcher delves deeper into the case, he discovers that Adrienne's father, Fred Maxwell, was the owner of the Maxwell Glass Company, which went out of business after the insurance company refused to pay his daughter Adeline. Fletcher learns that Fred Maxwell had a life insurance policy with Interoceanic and believes that Adrienne is seeking revenge for her father's mistreatment.

Fletcher confronts Adrienne with his suspicions and tricks her into revealing her true identity as Adeline Maxwell. He finds evidence in her possessions that seem to confirm her involvement in the fires. However, when Grayson, Fletcher's co-investigator, uncovers the truth that Adeline Maxwell had died several months ago, Fletcher realizes that he has framed an innocent person.

Feeling remorseful, Fletcher goes to the authorities and confesses his mistake. He explains that he was driven by his determination to solve the case and bring the real arsonist to justice. Grayson, disappointed with Fletcher's actions, leaves him, believing that Fletcher would sacrifice anyone to solve a case.

Fletcher, determined to make amends, starts investigating the case anew. He discovers that Adeline's father is alive and has been orchestrating the fires to seek revenge on the insurance company. Fletcher confronts Adeline's father, who confesses to his crimes. With the truth exposed, Fletcher is able to clear Adeline's name.

In the end, Fletcher brings Adeline's father to justice and repairs his relationship with Grayson.

== Cast ==
- Edmund Lowe as Tom Fletcher
- Ann Sothern as Adrienne Martin
- Onslow Stevens as John Grayson
- Robert Middlemass as Fire Chief Mulligan
- Wyrley Birch as Warden
- Selmer Jackson as District Attorney Cope
- Guy Usher as Police Chief Roberts
- Miki Morita as Noah

== Casting notes ==
This was the second of two features which paired 45-year-old veteran leading man Edmund Lowe, whose film career dates back to 1915, with 26-year-old newcomer Ann Sothern.
Let's Fall in Love, their initial film, also at Columbia Pictures, was released nearly two years earlier, in December 1933, and was the leading lady's first co-starring role as well as the first film featuring her new stage name "Ann Sothern".

== Tagline ==
"HE'S BURNING UP… and so is the town!
when a blonde baby out of nowhere starts going to blazes with him!"

== Grand Exit on Turner Classic Movies ==
Grand Exit was shown March 4, 2015 on Turner Classic Movies as part of its "Star of the Month salute" to Ann Sothern.

=== Introductory comments ===
"Hi, I'm Robert Osborne. Thanks so much for joining us. This week we begin our star of the month festival for March — a thirty-six-film salute to one of the most underrated actresses of the Golden Age of Hollywood, the delightful Ann Sothern. Over the course of her sixty-year career, Ann Sothern found success on the stage, on radio, on film and, certainly, on television, becoming one of those faces which would, invariably, make an audience, en masse, kind of give it a happy sigh of relief, knowing well, now we're in good hands, I know I'm gonna have a good time. And with Ann Sothern, they always did. Still, I don't think the film industry ever really fully appreciated her abilities and rarely gave her a chance to stretch as an actress, something Ann lamented about later in her life. Early on, she spent time working all over Hollywood — at Warner Brothers, RKO, Twentieth Century Fox and things got particularly promising for her when she signed with the mighty MGM in 1939. But that didn't really pan out much either. She was so charming in whatever she was given to do, MGM put her in one film after another and never really upping the stakes by teaming with any of the big male stars on the MGM contract list, people like Tracy or Gable, Bob Taylor, Walter Pidgeon. But all that was still in the future when she made our next film, as a contract player at colo... Columbia Studios.

Our film is called Grand Exit — it was done in nineteen thirty-five and teams Ann with Edmund Lowe. Now Edmund Lowe, in this movie, plays a ladies man who makes a living as an arson investigator. It's while investigating a whole string of arson fires, that he crosses paths with Ann Sothern who somehow always seems to be around when a building goes up in flames. It's all very lively and fast-paced — a movie that clocks in at just a little over an hour long. So have a look... from nineteen thirty-five, here's our star of the month, Ann Sothern doing what she always did so well — making an average script look very entertaining to watch. From nineteen thirty-five, here's Grand Exit."

=== Robert Osborne's closing comments ===
"When this film was in development in nineteen thirty-four, there was trouble with it and the Hollywood Production Code. Columbia Pictures submitted the script to the Code office for review and was rejected for filming because of fears that the film would actually teach people how to set arson fires. So the studio went to experts for some help — an insurance company and the LA Fire Department. Both reviewed the script and wrote letters to the Production Code office, challenging that decision — and the Code backed down… for once, which, in those days, it didn't often do. Up next, another breezy film from early in the film career of Ann Sothern. It's one of the many movies she made in which she was teamed with actor Gene Raymond."
