= The Old Wyoming Trail =

1937 film by Folmar Blangsted

- Directed by: Folmar Blangsted
- Written by: Ed Earl Repp
- Starring: Charles Starrett, Donald Grayson, Barbara Weeks, Dick Curtis, Edward LeSaint
- Cinematography: Allen G. Siegler
- Edited by: William Lyon
- Distributed by: Columbia Pictures
- Release date: November 8, 1937
- Running time: 56 minutes
- Country: United States
- Language: English
- Budget: 8,000 us dollars

The Old Wyoming Trail is a 1937 American Western film released by Columbia Pictures. Roy Rogers appears, albeit uncredited.

== Cast ==
- Charles Starrett - Bob Patterson
- Donald Grayson - Sandy
- Barbara Weeks - Elsie Halliday
- Dick Curtis - Ed Slade
- Edward LeSaint - Jeff Halliday
- Guy Usher - Lafe Kenney
- George Chesebro - Hank Barstow
- Edward Peil Sr. - Sheriff (as Edward Peil)
- Edward Hearn - Hammond (as Eddie Hearn)
