= Courage of the West =

- Theatrical release poster
- Directed by: Joseph H. Lewis
- Written by: Norton S. Parker
- Starring: Bob Baker; J. Farrell MacDonald; Lois January; Fuzzy Knight
- Cinematography: Virgil Miller
- Edited by: Charles Craft
- Music by: Fleming Allen
- Production company: Universal Pictures
- Distributed by: Universal Pictures
- Release date: December 1, 1937 (USA)
- Running time: 56 minutes
- Country: United States
- Language: English

Courage of the West is a 1937 American western film directed by Joseph H. Lewis in which Bob Baker made his debut as a singing cowboy.

== Plot ==
During the American Civil War, President Abraham Lincoln establishes the "Free Rangers" to protect gold shipments from the west. A ranger adopts the son of a convicted outlaw. He grows up and becomes the head of the Rangers. He finds himself in pursuit of a gang of gold robbers, not knowing that their leader is his natural father. After various twists and turns, the father is shot and the hero marries the girl with whom he has fallen in love.

== Cast ==
- C Farrell MacDonald
- Bob Baker
- ois January
- Fuzzy Knight

== Production ==
The film was the first production that Joseph H. Lewis directed. 75 non-union cowboys were hired in Sonora to work on the movie. Lewis was told that the Screen Actors Guild did not have jurisdiction at this distance from Los Angeles, although its members would have to be paid the standard rates agreed with the Guild. Filming was completed in seven days. This movie, Baker's first, was thought to be his best. The others suffered from predictable plots and poor scripts. Lois January, the love interest in the film, said, "Bob Baker was too pretty! He was nice, but didn't get friendly. He didn't want me to sing a song in his picture. That business is full of jealousy...". The railroad scenes were filmed on the Sierra Railroad in Tuolumne County, California.

== Music ==
Baker sings Resting Beside the Campfire, Ride Along Free Rangers, Song of the Trail, and I'll Build a Ranch House on the Range. Fleming Allen wrote all these songs.

== Reception ==
A New York Times review said, "Nothing of cult director Joseph H. Lewis' much-vaunted flair is on display in this average musical Western".

== Notes and references ==
Citations

Sources

- "Courage of the West - Brief Synopsis". Turner Classic Movies. Time Warner. Archived from the original on April 9, 2014.
- "Courage of the West (1937)". IMDB.
- Driscoll, Jim (December 30, 2008). "Warblin' Bob". Reflections of a B- Movie Junkie: A Tribute To, and Homage Of, the B-Movie Genre Films of the Saturday Matinees, of Primarily the '40's and '50's. ISBN 978-1-4628-3820-2.
- Fitzgerald, Michael G.; Magers, Boyd (October 30, 2009). Ladies of the Western: Interviews With 25 Actresses from the Silent Era to the Television Westerns of the 1950s and 1960s. McFarland. ISBN 978-0-7864-3938-6.
- Sarris, Andrew (1996). The American Cinema: Directors and Directions, 1929-1968. Da Capo Press. p. 132. ISBN 978-0-306-80728-2.
- Segrave, Kerry (January 16, 2009). Film Actors Organize: Union Formation Efforts in America, 1912-1937. McFarland. ISBN 978-0-7864-4276-8.
- Wollstein, Hans J. (2010). "Courage of the West (1937)". Movies & TV Dept. The New York Times. Archived from the original on February 16, 2013.
