= Jack Rockwell =

American actor (1890–1947)

- Born: John Rockwell Trowbridge; October 6, 1890; Veracruz, Mexico
- Died: November 10, 1947 (aged 57); Los Angeles, California, US
- Occupation: Actor
- Years active: 1930–1947
- Relatives: Charles Trowbridge (brother)

Jack Rockwell Trowbridge (October 6, 1890 – November 10, 1947) was an American film actor who was born in Mexico. He appeared in over 250 movies, mostly Westerns, between 1927 and 1947.

Rockwell's older brother was character actor Charles Trowbridge. In the 1920s, prior to embarking on a professional career as actor, he worked as a fireman.

His death in 1947 was due to hypostatic pneumonia, not a "nervous breakdown" as claimed on IMDb.

== Selected filmography ==
List of acting performances in film and television
Year	Title	Role
1927	The Prairie King	Henchman
1932	Come On, Tarzan	Sheriff
1932	Outlaw Justice	Sheriff Jake
1932	Whistlin' Dan	Cal Webster
1934	Honor of the Range	Henchman Rocky
1934	The Lawless Frontier	Sheriff Luke Williams
1934	The Law of the Wild	Sheriff
1935	Alias John Law	Marshall Lamar Blyth
1935	Five Bad Men	
1935	Bulldog Courage	Pete Brennan
1935	Justice of the Range	Rawhide
1935	No Man's Range	Sheriff
1935	Riding Wild	Rusty
1935	Sundown Saunders	Preston
1935	The Tonto Kid	Sheriff Hack Baker
1935	Valley of Wanted Men	U.S. Marshall
1936	Brand of the Outlaws	Deputy Ben Holt
1936	The Lawless Nineties	Smith
1936	The Law Rides	Sheriff Anderson
1936	Lucky Terror	Bat Boulton
1936	Roarin' Guns	Bob Morgan
1936	Rogue of the Range	Henchman Sloan
1936	Winds of the Wasteland	Buchanan City Marshal
1936	Rio Grande Ranger	Ranger Captain Winkler
1936	The Traitor	Smoky
1937	Bar-Z Bad Men	Ed Parks
1937	Riders of the Rockies	Captain Reyes
1937	Texas Trail	Henchman Shorty
1937	Two Gun Law	Bledsoe
1938	Prairie Justice	John Benson
1938	Law of the Plains	Marshal
1939	Days of Jesse James	Thompson McDaniels
1939	The Stranger from Texas	Sheriff Fletcher
1941	Law of the Range	Sheriff Henderson
1941	Riders of Death Valley	Trigger
1942	Man from Cheyenne	Brenner
1942	Overland Mail	Slade
1942	Undercover Man	Captain John Hawkins
1944	Lumberjack	Sheriff Miles
