= Two Gun Law =

1937 film by Leon Barsha

- Theatrical release poster
- Directed by: Leon Barsha
- Screenplay by: John Rathmell
- Story by: Norman Sheldon
- Produced by: Harry L. Decker
- Starring: Charles Starrett; Peggy Stratford
- Cinematography: George Meehan
- Edited by: William Lyon
- Production company: Columbia Pictures
- Release date: April 7, 1937 (US)
- Running time: 58 minutes
- Country: United States
- Language: English

Two Gun Law is a 1937 American Western film directed by Leon Barsha, starring Charles Starrett and Peggy Stratford.

== Cast ==
- Charles Starrett as Bob Larson
- Peggy Stratford as Mary Hammond
- Hank Bell as Cookie
- Edward J. Le Saint as Ben Hammond
- Charles Middleton as Wolf Larson
- Alan Bridge as Kipp Faulkner
- Lee Prather as Sheriff Bill Collier
- Dick Curtis as Len Edwards
- Victor Potel as Cassius
- Art Mix as Cullen
- George Chesebro as Blair
- Edmund Cobb as Catlin
- Jack Rockwell as Bledsoe
- Hal Taliaferro as Cattle buyer
- Lee Shumway as Bartender
