= Without Honor (1932 film) =

1932 film

Without Honors
- Theatrical release poster
- Directed by: William Nigh
- Written by: Harry L. Fraser (scenario); Lee Sage (story)
- Produced by: George M. Merrick (associate producer); Louis Weiss (producer) (uncredited)
- Cinematography: Edward Linden
- Edited by: Holbrook N. Todd
- Production company: Weiss Brothers
- Distributed by: Weiss Brothers
- Release date: January 2, 1932
- Running time: 66 minutes
- Country: United States
- Language: English

Without Honor is a 1932 American pre-Code Western film directed by William Nigh.

== Plot ==
A gambler joins the Texas Rangers in hopes of finding the true perpetrators of the killings in which his brother is implicated.

== Cast ==
- Harry Carey as Pete Marlan
- Mae Busch as Mary Ryan
- Gibson Gowland as Mike Donovan
- Mary Jane Irving as Bernice Donovan
- Ed Brady as Lopez Venero
- Jack Richardson as Steve Henderson
- Tom London as "Sholt" Fletcher
- Lafe McKee as Ranger Captain Frank Henderson
- Lee Sage as Jack Marlan, Texas Ranger
- Maston Williams as Jim Bowman, the gambler

== Home media ==
In 2025, Without Honor was included as an extra feature on Kino Lorber's Blu-ray of Law and Order (1932).
