= Jeanne Madden =

American singer and actress (1917–1989)

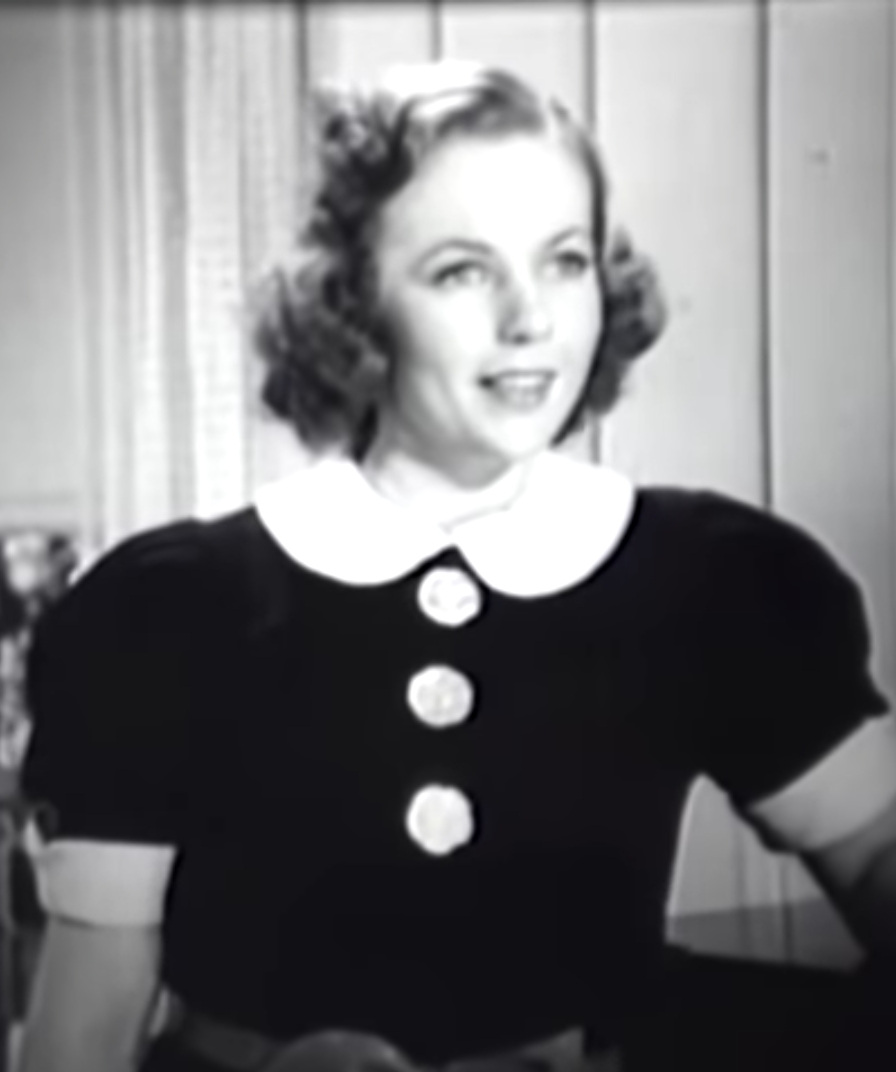
- Madden in Sea Racketeers (1937)
- Born: Jeanne Ethel Madden; November 10, 1917; Scranton, Pennsylvania, U.S.
- Died: January 15, 1989 (aged 71); Moscow, Pennsylvania, U.S.
- Occupations: Actress; singer
- Years active: 1936–1937 (film)

Jeanne Madden (born Jeanne Ethel Madden; November 10, 1917 – January 15, 1989), was an American singer known for her roles in musical theatre. She also appeared in a handful of films.

== Filmography ==
- Stage Struck (1936)
- Sea Racketeers (1937)
- Talent Scout (1937)

== Bibliography ==
- Thomas S. Hischak. The Oxford Companion to the American Musical: Theatre, Film, and Television. Oxford University Press, 2008.
