= Bar-Z Bad Men =

1937 film

- Film poster
- Directed by: Sam Newfield
- Screenplay by: George H. Plympton
- Story by: James P. Olsen
- Produced by: A.W. Hackel
- Cinematography: Bert Longenecker
- Edited by: S. Roy Luby
- Distributed by: Republic Pictures
- Release date: April 22, 1937
- Running time: 57 minutes
- Country: United States
- Language: English

Bar-Z Bad Men is a 1937 American Western film directed by Sam Newfield and starring Johnny Mack Brown.

== Plot ==
When reckless and boisterous Jim Waters (Johnny Mack Brown) is faced with a jail term for what he calls harmless fun, he heads to the Bar-Z Ranch, promising to stay out of town. When he gets there, he runs right into the middle of a range war between two cattlemen. Murder and deceit draw Jim in, determined to uncover who is behind the rustling.

== Cast ==
- Johnny Mack Brown as Jim Waters
- Lois January as Beth Harvey
- Tom London as Sig Bostell
- Frank LaRue as Hamp Harvey
- Ernie Adams as Henchman Pete
- Dick Curtis as Brent – Ranch Foreman
- Milburn Morante as Sherlock – Arizona Deputy
- Jack Rockwell as Ed Parks
