= Beatrice Roberts =

American actress (1905–1970)

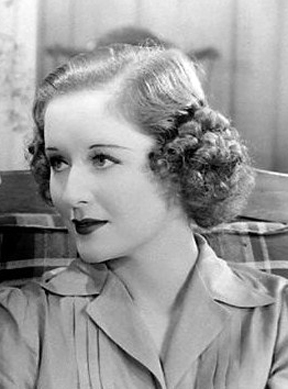
- Roberts in Park Avenue Logger (1937)
- Born: Alice Beatrice Roberts; March 7, 1905; Manhattan, New York, U.S.
- Died: July 24, 1970 (aged 65); Plymouth, Massachusetts, U.S.
- Occupation: Actress
- Years active: 1933–1949
- Spouses: Robert A. Dillon (m. 1928; ann. 1933): John Wesley Smith (m. 1940; div. 19??)

Alice Beatrice Roberts (March 7, 1905 – July 24, 1970) was an American film actress.

== Early years ==
Roberts was born on March 7, 1905, in New York City. She was the daughter of Mr. and Mrs. Colin M. Roberts, and she attended Winthrop High School.

She entered several beauty pageants, including the 1924 and 1925 Miss America pageants in Atlantic City, New Jersey (as Miss Manhattan, 1924, and Miss Greater New York, 1925). She won the "Most Beautiful Girl in Evening Gown" award each time.

== Career ==
Roberts went to Hollywood in 1933 and between then and 1949, she appeared in nearly 60 films. From 1938 she worked exclusively at Universal Pictures through special arrangement with Metro-Goldwyn-Mayer. Author Charles Higham explains that MGM studio chief Louis B. Mayer "had noticed her when she appeared as a guest in a party scene in San Francisco; soon afterward, he began dating her. He fell in love with her; for years, she was the love of his life. She shared with him a passion for operettas and Viennese waltzes; she was an accomplished pianist, which, of course, appealed to him. Mayer insisted on keeping her under contract, loaning her out for picture after picture ... He had an under-the-table arrangement with Universal to have her placed on semipermanent loan-out, and for the next 10 years she appeared in Universal films as maids, nurses, or secretaries." Her most notable role was that of Queen Azura in Flash Gordon's Trip to Mars, a 1938 serial for Universal.

== Personal life ==
She married Robert A. Dillon in Tijuana, Mexico, on May 17, 1928. That marriage was annulled on September 8, 1933, because Dillon was a bigamist, having had another wife at the time of his marriage to Roberts. In 1940, Roberts married John Wesley Smith.

== Death ==
Roberts died on July 24th, 1970, in Plymouth, Massachusetts, from pneumonia, aged 65.

== Selected filmography ==
- Fast Life (1932) – Guest (uncredited)
- Melody Cruise (1933) – Ship Passenger (uncredited)
- Pilgrimage (1933) – Sick Nurse (uncredited)
- My Weakness (1933) – Mannequin. Woman's Journal (uncredited)
- My Woman (1933) – Party Girl (uncredited)
- The Worst Woman in Paris? (1933) – Gossip at Club Bon Vivant (uncredited)
- The Return of Chandu (1934, Serial) – Party Guest [Ch. 1] (uncredited)
- The Captain Hates the Sea (1934) – Passenger (uncredited)
- Night Life of the Gods (1935) – One of the 3 Graces (uncredited)
- Naughty Marietta (1935) – Minor Role (uncredited)
- Times Square Lady (1935) – Casa Nova Patron (uncredited)
- West Point of the Air (1935) – Woman in Party at Night Club (uncredited)
- China Seas (1935) – Ship's Passenger (uncredited)
- Broadway Melody of 1936 (1935) – Showgirl (uncredited)
- Wife vs. Secretary (1936) – Party Guest (uncredited)
- We Went to College (1936) – Sightseeing Alumnus's Wife (uncredited)
- San Francisco (1936) – Forrestal Guest (uncredited)
- Sinner Take All (1936) – Hat Check Girl (uncredited)
- Park Avenue Logger (1937) – Peggy O'Shea
- Bill Cracks Down (1937) – Susan Bailey
- Outlaws of the Orient (1937) – Alice
- Love Takes Flight (1937) – Joan Lawson
- Flash Gordon's Trip to Mars (1938, Serial) – Queen Azura
- The Devil's Party (1938) – Helen McCoy
- Pioneers of the West (1940) – Anna Bailey
- Tight Shoes (1941) – Waitress (uncredited)
- San Antonio Rose (1941) – Diner (uncredited)
- Mob Town (1941) – Bit Role (uncredited)
- Never Give a Sucker an Even Break (1941) – Stewardess (uncredited)
- Bombay Clipper (1942) – Miss Kane – Secretary (uncredited)
- What's Cookin'? (1942) – Miss Lewis (uncredited)
- Gang Busters (1942, Serial) – O'Brien's Secretary (uncredited)
- The Mystery of Marie Roget (1942) – Woman #2 Reading Newespaper (uncredited)
- It Comes Up Love (1943) – Bernice
- Frankenstein Meets the Wolf Man (1943) – Varja – Barmaid (uncredited)
- He's My Guy (1943) – Secretary (uncredited)
- Phantom of the Opera (1943) – Nurse (uncredited)
- Fired Wife (1943) – Divorcee (uncredited)
- Adventures of the Flying Cadets (1943, Serial) – Hill Aerial Secretary [Ch. 1] (uncredited)
- Top Man (1943) – War Plant Worker (uncredited)
- Phantom Lady (1944) – Monteiro's Maid (uncredited)
- Her Primitive Man (1944) – Maid (uncredited)
- Jungle Woman (1944) – Inquest Juror (uncredited)
- The Invisible Man's Revenge (1944) – Nurse (uncredited)
- Allergic to Love (1944) – Mrs. Walker (uncredited)
- Reckless Age (1944) – WAVE (uncredited)
- Dead Man's Eyes (1944) – Nurse (uncredited)
- Hi, Beautiful (1944) – Hostess (uncredited)
- Song of the Sarong (1945) – Radio Telephone Operator (uncredited)
- Strange Confession (1945) – Miss Rogers, Secretary (uncredited)
- This Love of Ours (1945) – Surgical Nurse (uncredited)
- Scarlet Street (1945) – Secretary (uncredited)
- Because of Him (1946) – Wife (uncredited)
- The Scarlet Horseman (1946) – Halliday's Maid (uncredited)
- The Mysterious Mr. M (1946) – Dr. Walker (uncredited)
- The Killers (1946) – Nurse (uncredited)
- White Tie and Tails (1946) – Marie (uncredited)
- The Brute Man (1946) – Nurse (uncredited)
- The Egg and I (1947) – Nurse (uncredited)
- Time Out of Mind (1947) – Mrs. Weber (uncredited)
- Ride the Pink Horse (1947) – Shop Manager (uncredited)
- The Senator Was Indiscreet (1947) – Woman (uncredited)
- Mr. Peabody and the Mermaid (1948) – Mother
- For the Love of Mary (1948) – Dorothy
- You Gotta Stay Happy (1948) – Maid (uncredited)
- An Act of Murder (1948) – Nurse Coble (uncredited)
- Family Honeymoon (1948) – Belle (uncredited)
- Criss-Cross (1949) – Nurse (uncredited) (final film role)
