= Maston Williams =

American actor (1879-1978)

- Born: April 23, 1879; Navarro County, Texas, United States
- Died: July 15, 1978 (aged 99); Corsicana, Texas, United States
- Occupation: Actor
- Years active: 1931-1939

Maston Williams (April 23, 1879 – July 15, 1978) was an American actor who appeared in films during the 1930s. He appeared in more than 40 films between 1931 and 1939.

== Selected filmography ==
- Clearing the Range (1931)
- Without Honor (1932)
- The Gambling Sex (1932)
- Fighting with Kit Carson (1933)
- The Lost Jungle (1934)
- The Outlaw Tamer (1935)
- Public Cowboy No. 1 (1937)
- Heart of the Rockies (1937)
- Whistling Bullets (1937)
- Call the Mesquiteers (1938)
- The Overland Express (1938)
- The Lone Ranger (1938)
- Heroes of the Hills (1938)
