= Park Avenue Logger =

1937 film by David Howard

- Theatrical release poster
- Directed by: David Howard
- Written by: Daniel Jarrett (screenplay and adaptation); Ewing Scott (screenplay and adaptation)
- Based on: Park Avenue Logger; 1935 story in The Saturday Evening Post by Bruce Hutchison
- Produced by: Leonard Goldstein (associate producer); George A. Hirliman (producer)
- Starring: George O'Brien; Beatrice Roberts; Willard Robertson
- Cinematography: Frank B. Good
- Edited by: Robert O. Crandall
- Music by: Abe Meyer
- Production company: George A. Hirliman Productions
- Distributed by: RKO Radio Pictures
- Release date: February 26, 1937
- Running time: 67 minutes
- Country: United States
- Language: English

Park Avenue Logger is a 1937 American lumberjack Western film directed by David Howard. The film is also known as Millionaire Playboy in the United Kingdom and Tall Timber (American reissue title). It is based on the short story of the same name by Bruce Hutchison that appeared in the 30 November 1935 issue of the Saturday Evening Post.

== Plot ==
Mike Curran believes his son Grant is an effete aesthete and decides to toughen him up by sending him under a false name to work at one of Mike's logging camps. Unknown to the elder Curren, his son spends his evenings as a masked wrestler; Grant believes his family would be embarrassed if they knew the truth.

Also unknown to Mike Curran is the fact that his friend and logging camp boss Ben Morton and his stooge Paul Sangar are embezzling money from the Curren owned camp and are trying to force Peggy O'Shea's rival logging camp out of business by deadly acts of sabotage.

The pair send Grant to work at Peggy's camp with a group of handpicked idlers. The hard and dangerous tasks that Paul orders him to do backfire when Grant sets a faster pace that the workmen emulate. Grant moves in on Peggy O'Shea who Paul believes is his girl. When Peggy makes it clear to Paul that she prefers Grant to him, Paul responds by hiring three toughs to threaten Grant to make him leave. After Grant laughs in their face and won't be provoked, Peggy believes him a coward. The trio wait outside a dance hall to give Grant a beating, but they discover the hard way that Grant is a man not to be trifled with. When they gain consciousness they run for their lives.

Paul finds Grant's photograph and real identity in a magazine and falsely tells Peggy that Grant's father sent him to put her out of business and that Grant is the one responsible for the sabotage. Peggy throws Grant out of her employ and agrees to marry Paul out of spite...

== Cast ==
- George O'Brien as Grant Curran
- Beatrice Roberts as Peggy O'Shea
- Willard Robertson as Ben Morton
- Ward Bond as Paul Sangar
- Bert Hanlon as Nick
- Gertrude Short as Margy MacLean
- Lloyd Ingraham as Mike Curran
- George Rosener as Matt O'Shea
- Robert Emmett O'Connor as Police Sergeant
- Jonathan as Wrestler
