= Lightnin' Crandall =

1937 film by Sam Newfield

- Directed by: Sam Newfield
- Screenplay by: Charles F. Royal
- Story by: E.B. Mann
- Produced by: A. W. Hackel
- Starring: Bob Steele; Lois January; Charles King; Earl Dwire; Ernie Adams; Frank LaRue
- Cinematography: Bert Longenecker
- Edited by: S. Roy Luby
- Production company: Supreme Pictures Corporation
- Distributed by: Republic Pictures
- Release date: March 24, 1937
- Running time: 60 minutes
- Country: United States
- Language: English

Lightnin' Crandall is a 1937 American Western film directed by Sam Newfield and written by Charles F. Royal. The film stars Bob Steele, Lois January, Charles King, Earl Dwire, Ernie Adams and Frank LaRue. The film was released on March 24, 1937, by Republic Pictures.

== Cast ==
- Bob Steele as Bob Crandall aka Lightnin' Crandall
- Lois January as Sheila Shannon
- Charles King as Carson Blaine
- Earl Dwire as Parson Durkin
- Ernie Adams as Texas May
- Frank LaRue as Wes Shannon
- Horace Murphy as J. Travis
- Lloyd Ingraham as Judge
- Lew Meehan as Henchman Bull Prescott
- Dave O'Brien as Tommy Shannon
