= Westbound Mail =

1937 film by Folmar Blangsted

- Directed by: Folmar Blangsted
- Written by: James P. Hogan; Frances Guihan
- Produced by: Harry L. Decker
- Starring: Charles Starrett; Rosalind Keith; Edward Keane
- Cinematography: Benjamin H. Kline
- Edited by: Richard Fantl
- Music by: Morris Stoloff
- Production company: Columbia Pictures
- Distributed by: Columbia Pictures
- Release date: January 22, 1937
- Running time: 60 minutes
- Country: United States
- Language: English

Westbound Mail is a 1937 American Western film directed by Folmar Blangsted and starring Charles Starrett, Rosalind Keith and Edward Keane.

== Cast ==
- Charles Starrett as Jim 'Skinner' Bradley
- Rosalind Keith as Marion Saunders
- Edward Keane as 'Gun' Barlow
- Arthur Stone as Andy
- Ben Welden as Steve Hickman
- Al Bridge as 'Bull' Feeney (as Alan Bridge)
- George Chesebro as Henchman Slim
- Art Mix as Henchman Shorty
- Lew Meehan as Henchman
- Fred Parker as Townsman
- Bill Patton as Henchman
- Francis Walker as Henchman

== Bibliography ==
- Pitts, Michael R. Western Movies: A Guide to 5,105 Feature Films. McFarland, 2012.
