= Talent Scout =

1937 film by William Clemens

- Directed by: William Clemens
- Written by: George Bilson; William Jacobs; George Bricker; John Pearson
- Produced by: Bryan Foy; Hal B. Wallis
- Starring: Donald Woods; Jeanne Madden; Fred Lawrence
- Cinematography: Rex Wimpy
- Edited by: Terry O. Morse
- Music by: Howard Jackson
- Production company: Warner Bros. Pictures
- Distributed by: Warner Bros. Pictures
- Release date: July 24, 1937
- Running time: 62 minutes
- Country: United States
- Language: English

Talent Scout is a 1937 American musical drama film directed by William Clemens and starring Donald Woods, Jeanne Madden and Fred Lawrence. It is also known by the alternative title of Studio Romance.

The film's sets were designed by the art director Esdras Hartley.

== Plot ==
After being fired from his job at a film studio, a talent agent attempts to build his new discovery into a star.

== Cast ==
- Donald Woods as Steve Stewart
- Jeanne Madden as Mary Brannigan
- Fred Lawrence as Raymond Crane
- Rosalind Marquis as Bernice Fox
- Joseph Crehan as A.J. Lambert
- Charles Halton as M.B. Carter
- Teddy Hart as Moe Jerome
- Mary Treen as Janet Morris
- Robert Paige as Bert Smith
- Albert Herman as Jack Scholl
- Joan Valerie as Ruth - Secretary
- John Pearson as Jed Hudkins
- Frank Faylen as Master of Ceremonies
- John Harron as Charlie - Bus Driver
- Mary Doyle as Miss Grant - Carter's Secretary
- Harry Fox as Robert Donnolly - Rehearsal Director

== Bibliography ==
- Steven Bingen. Warner Bros.: Hollywood's Ultimate Backlot. Rowman & Littlefield, 2014.
