= Sea Racketeers =

1937 film by Hamilton MacFadden

- Directed by: Hamilton MacFadden
- Screenplay by: Dorrell McGowan; Stuart E. McGowan
- Produced by: Armand Schaefer (associate producer)
- Starring: Weldon Heyburn; Jeanne Madden; Warren Hymer
- Cinematography: Ernest Miller
- Edited by: William Morgan
- Music by: Alberto Colombo (uncredited)
- Distributed by: Republic Pictures
- Release date: August 20, 1937
- Running time: 64 minutes (US, original); 58 minutes (US, edited)
- Country: United States
- Language: English

Sea Racketeers is a 1937 American film directed by Hamilton MacFadden and starring Weldon Heyburn, Jeanne Madden, and Warren Hymer.

== Cast ==
- Weldon Heyburn as Chief Bos'n Mate Jim Wilson
- Jeanne Madden as Patricia 'Pat' Collins
- Warren Hymer as Mate 'Spud' Jones
- Penny Singleton as Florence 'Toots' Riley
- J. Carrol Naish as Harry Durant
- Joyce Compton as Blondie
- Charles Trowbridge as Maxwell Gordon
- Syd Saylor as Henchman Weasel
- Lane Chandler as Lt. Hays (radio voice) / Insp. L. McGrath
- Benny Burt as Henchman Maxie
- Ralph Sanford as Henchman Turk
- Don Rowan as Henchman Lew
- Bryant Washburn as Wilbur Crane

== Soundtrack ==
- Penny Singleton (as Dorothy McNulty) "The Lady Wants To Dance"
- Jeanne Madden - "What Do You Say?"
- Jeanne Madden - "Let's Finish the Dream"
- Jeanne Madden - "Even Since Adam and Eve"
