= Lois January =

American actress (1912–2006)

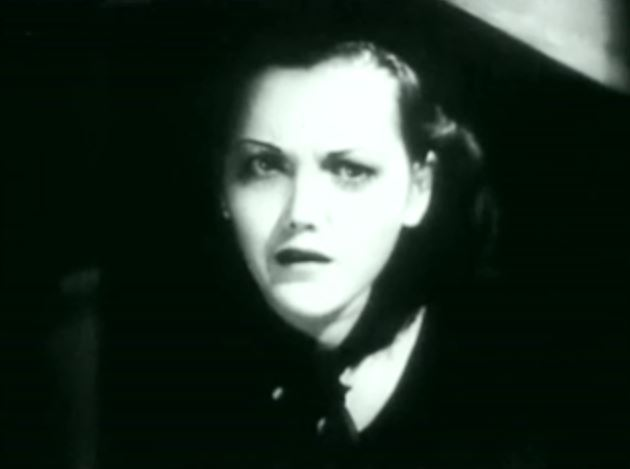
- January in The Pace That Kills (1935)
- Born: Laura Lois January; October 5, 1912; McAllen, Texas, U.S.
- Died: August 7, 2006 (aged 93); Los Angeles, California, U.S.
- Occupations: Film, television actress and singer
- Years active: 1932–1987
- Spouse(s): Abraham Meyer (1937–1940, divorce); Bill Gernnant (1941–?, divorce)

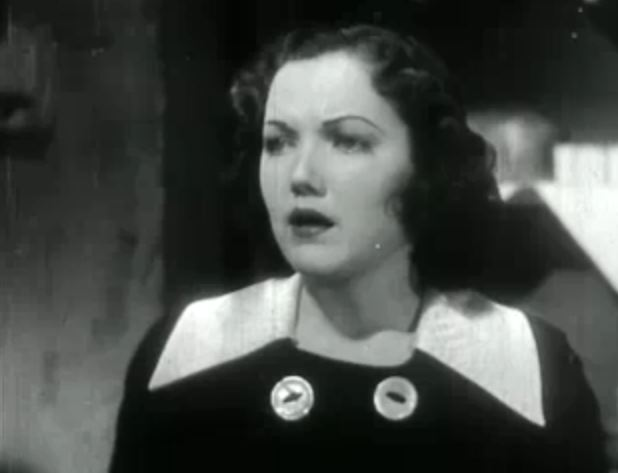
January in Rogue of the Range (1936)

Lois January (October 5, 1912 – August 7, 2006) was an American actress and singer who performed small roles in several B-movies during the 1930s.

== Early life ==
Born in McAllen, Texas, as Laura Lois January, she "was prodded into show business by her Texas-born mother, Lucile Clara (née Buck), whom Lois described as "pushy". Her father, Charles James January, competed in soccer at the 1904 Summer Olympics. January attended Virgil Junior High School and the Marlborough School for girls. She also studied dance at the Denishawn School of Dancing and Related Arts and acted in stage productions in Los Angeles.

== Career ==
January's first credited role was in 1933, in the short subject UM-PA. Her most famous role, however, is probably as the Emerald City manicurist in The Wizard of Oz who sings to Dorothy that "we can make a dimpled smile out of a frown". Although the character was unnamed, many fans believe it to be an incarnation of novel character Jellia Jamb.

During the 1930s, she played in numerous westerns as the heroine, usually opposite Johnny Mack Brown, Bob Steele, Tim McCoy and Bob Baker, among others. In 1935 she starred opposite Reb Russell in Arizona Bad Man, and in 1936 she starred with Brown in Rogue of the Range, and alongside Tim McCoy in Border Caballero. While under contract with Universal Pictures she continued to play heroine roles in westerns, and in 1937 she starred opposite Bob Baker in Courage of the West. The reissuing of the 1935 exploitation film The Pace That Kills (under the title Cocaine Fiends) would eventually lend January even more exposure, however limited.

January's Broadway credits include High Kickers (1941) and Yokel Boy (1939) alongside Judy Canova and Buddy Ebsen.

By the mid-1940s, her starring roles had waned but she continued to act in non-starring parts. In 1942 she was the "poster girl" for Chesterfield cigarettes. From 1960 through 1987, she played small parts on television series such as My Three Sons, Marcus Welby, M.D. and Barnaby Jones. Her last acting role was in 1987, on the television movie Double Agent. During the 1980s she attended several western film festivals.

== Personal life ==
In April 1937, January married theatrical agent Abraham Meyer. They were divorced on August 9, 1940. She later married radio producer Bill Gernnant. The couple had a daughter, Jan (born 1949).

== Filmography ==
- Double Agent (1987) as a Dowager
- The Little Shepherd of Kingdom Come (1961) as Mrs. Dean
- The Wizard of Oz (1939) as Manicurist
- Life Returns (1938) as Nurse
- Lightnin' Crandall (1937) as Sheila Shannon
- Bar-Z Bad Men (1937) as Beth Harvey
- The Red Rope (1937) as Betty Duncan
- The Trusted Outlaw (1937) as Molly
- The Roaming Cowboy (1937) as Jeanie
- Courage of the West (1937) as Beth Andrews
- Moonlight on the Range (1937) as Wanda Brooks
- Border Caballero (1936) as Goldie Harris
- Lightnin' Bill Carson (1936) as Dolores
- Rogue of the Range (1936) as Stella [Lamb]
- One Rainy Afternoon (1936) as Mr. Pelerin's secretary
- Flying Hostess (1936) as Waitress
- Easy to Take (1936) as Annie
- Night Life of the Gods (1935)
- Stolen Harmony (1935) as Woman in sextet
- Society Fever (1935) as Julie Prouty
- Skull and Crown (1935) as Barbara Franklin
- Arizona Bad Man (1935) as Lucy Dunstan
- The Pace That Kills (1935) as Jane Bradford, also known as Lil
- The Affair of Susan (1935) as Girl in candy shop
- Splendor (1935) as Lena Limering
- The Man Who Reclaimed His Head (1934)
- Let's Be Ritzy (1934) as Stenographer
- The Love Captive (1934) as Girl
- Uncertain Lady (1934) as Maid
- The Human Side (1934) as High school girl
- The Black Cat (1934) as Cultist
- Glamour (1934) as Chorus girl
- Let's Talk It Over (1934) as Alice
- By Candlelight (1933) as Ann
- Umpa (1933) as Nurse (?)

== Death ==
Lois January died in Los Angeles, California of Alzheimer's disease on August 7, 2006, aged 93.
