= Whistling Bullets =

1937 film directed by John English

- Theatrical release poster
- Directed by: John English
- Screenplay by: Joseph O'Donnell
- Based on: The Fifth Man by James Oliver Curwood
- Produced by: Maurice Conn
- Starring: Kermit Maynard; Harley Wood; Maston Williams; Karl Hackett; Jack Ingram; Bruce Mitchell; James Sheridan
- Cinematography: Jack Greenhalgh
- Edited by: Richard G. Wray
- Production company: Ambassador Pictures
- Distributed by: Ambassador Pictures
- Release date: May 3, 1937
- Running time: 58 minutes
- Country: United States
- Language: English

Whistling Bullets is a 1937 American Western film directed by John English and written by Joseph O'Donnell. The film stars Kermit Maynard, Harley Wood, Maston Williams, Karl Hackett, Jack Ingram, Bruce Mitchell and James Sheridan. The film was released on May 3, 1937, by Ambassador Pictures.

== Cast ==
- Kermit Maynard as Larry Graham
- Harley Wood as Anita Saunders
- Maston Williams as Ace Beldon
- Karl Hackett as Dave Stone
- Jack Ingram as Tim Raymond
- Bruce Mitchell as Captain John Saunders
- James Sheridan as Sam
- Cliff Parkinson as Bart
- Cherokee Alcorn as Karl
