= Double Agent (1987 film) =

- Genre: Spy comedy
- Teleplay by: Steven Long Mitchell; Craig W. Van Sickle; Howard Friedlander; Ken Peragine
- Story by: Howard Friedlander; Ken Peragine
- Directed by: Michael Vejar
- Starring: Michael McKean; Susan Walden; Christopher Burton; Judith Jones; Lloyd Bochner
- Music by: Alf Clausen
- Country of origin: United States
- Original language: English

Production
- Producer: Mark H. Ovitz
- Cinematography: Fred J. Koenekamp
- Editor: Dennis Virkler
- Running time: 88 minutes
- Production companies: Mark H. Ovitz Productions; Walt Disney Television

Original release
- Network: ABC
- Release: March 29, 1987

Double Agent is a 1987 American spy comedy television film directed by Michael Vejar for Walt Disney Television. It stars Michael McKean, Susan Walden, Christopher Burton, Judith Jones, and Lloyd Bochner. Additional cast members include Del Zamora, John Putch, Alexa Hamilton, Jane A. Johnston, Lois January, Saveli Kramarov, Allan Kolman, and Big John Studd. Double Agent was first telecast on ABC March 29, 1987, as an episode of The Disney Sunday Movie series.

The plot revolves around "two brothers, one is a kind of James Bond, a secret agent with an infallible aim, an irresistible womanizer, the other, his twin, a quiet family man, (theoretically) unprepared to face dangers."

== Plot ==
Jason Starr is an international spy. While on a mission, there an altercation and Jason disappears. His boss Vaughn then goes to his twin brother Warren Starbinder, a veterinarian, and asks him to pose as Jason so to complete his mission. Warren agrees to do so but the talk will not be easy since he is not a spy. Warren also cannot tell his wife and family what he's doing which makes it hard for him to explain the peculiar ways he is now behaving. He is supposed to deliver a quarter million dollars in exchange for an overlay of a secret document. He is chased by the KGB and an ex-NSB agent who is out for revenge.

== Soundtrack ==
"Chemistry", a song by the new wave duo Who's Who?, appears in the film.

== Reception ==
Film Dienst described the film as follows, "Family entertainment that activates all the usual clichés and is as harmless as it is inconsequential." Kino.de wrote, "Harmless spy comedy for the whole family from the Disney TV production. Without a distinctive cast nor anything clearly original."

The film was noted for McKean’s double role, although TV Today (Germany) commented, "He's better at composing: Michael McKean's song for the film A Mighty Wind received an Oscar nomination this year (2003)."
