= The Trusted Outlaw =

1937 film by Robert N. Bradbury

- Theatrical release poster
- Directed by: Robert N. Bradbury
- Screenplay by: George H. Plympton; Fred Myton
- Story by: Johnston McCulley
- Produced by: A. W. Hackel
- Starring: Bob Steele; Lois January; Joan Barclay; Earl Dwire; Charles King; Richard Cramer
- Cinematography: Bert Longenecker
- Edited by: Thomas Neff
- Production company: Supreme Pictures Corporation
- Distributed by: Republic Pictures
- Release date: May 4, 1937
- Running time: 57 minutes
- Country: United States
- Language: English

The Trusted Outlaw is a 1937 American Western film directed by Robert N. Bradbury, written by George H. Plympton and Fred Myton, and starring Bob Steele, Lois January, Joan Barclay, Earl Dwire, Charles King and Richard Cramer. It was released on May 4, 1937, by Republic Pictures.

== Plot ==
Reformed criminal Dan Ward is trusted with getting the payrolls of Mr. Pember's workers to the mine, but is having trouble with his rival Jim Swain's gang.

== Cast ==
- Bob Steele as Dan Ward
- Lois January as Molly Clark
- Joan Barclay as Betty Pember
- Earl Dwire as Jim Swain
- Charles King as Bert Gilmore
- Richard Cramer as Rogan
- Hal Price as Mr. Pember
- Frank Ball as Sheriff Bob Larimer
- Budd Buster as Adler
