= Love Takes Flight =

1937 film directed by Conrad Nagel

- Theatrical release poster
- Directed by: Conrad Nagel
- Screenplay by: Lionel Houser; Mervin J. Houser
- Story by: Anne Morrison Chapin
- Produced by: George Hirliman
- Starring: Bruce Cabot; Beatrice Roberts; John Sheehan; Astrid Allwyn; Elliot Fisher; Wild Bill Elliott
- Cinematography: Mack Stengler
- Edited by: Tony Martinelli
- Production company: George A. Hirliman Productions
- Distributed by: Grand National Films Inc.
- Release date: November 5, 1937
- Running time: 70 minutes
- Country: United States
- Language: English

Love Takes Flight is a 1937 American drama film directed by Conrad Nagel and written by Lionel Houser and Mervin J. Houser. The film stars Bruce Cabot, Beatrice Roberts, John Sheehan, Astrid Allwyn, Elliot Fisher and Wild Bill Elliott. The film was released on November 5, 1937, by Grand National Films Inc.

== Plot ==
Joan Lawson is flight hostess in love with the pilot, Neil Bradshaw. Neil some day wants flying solo around the world. On a flight from New York City to Los Angeles movie producer Dave Miller wants Joan to become a movie star but she wants Neil to teach her to be a pilot. The airplane is grounded in L.A due to bad weather but movie star Diane Andre, a passenger on the plane, insists that plane takes off. It does and later the plane is reported lost but it is revealed it was forced down on a mountain by the storm. While stuck on the mountain Diane offers Neil the leading man roll in her new film and he gives up his flying career. Joan decides she will go on with her flying lessons and plans to fly around the world solo.

== Cast ==
- Bruce Cabot as Neil 'Brad' Bradshaw
- Beatrice Roberts as Joan Lawson
- John Sheehan as Spud Johnson
- Astrid Allwyn as Diane Audre
- Elliot Fisher as Tommy Lawson
- Wild Bill Elliott as Bill Parker
- Edwin Maxwell as Dave Miller
- Harry Tyler as Harry Stone
- Peter Potter as Tex Rice
- Grady Sutton as Donald
- Arthur Hoyt as Grey
- William L. Thorne as Bill Parker Sr.
- Brooks Benedict as Eddie
- Henry Roquemore as Woodsy
- Carol Tevis as Myrtle Johnson
- Jack Duffy as Bartender
- Reed Howes as NBC Announcer

== Critical reception ==
Variety provided a negative review and wrote, "Poorly cast and loosely directed plane yarn is entirely too airy for discriminating patrons ... Conrad Nagel's attempt at directing is still an attempt." Of the actors, the reviewer commented "[Beatrice] Roberts ... displays lack of animation ... [Bruce] Cabot easily walks away with the film. Astrid Allwyn, as the siren, is also okay."
