= Harlene Wood =

American actor, songwriter, and author (1913–1995)

- Wood in The Three Stooges film Cash and Carry (1937)
- Born: Evelyn Merchant; August 25, 1913; Independence, Missouri, U.S.
- Died: April 2, 1995 (aged 81); Honokaʻa, Hawaii, U.S.
- Other names: Harley Wood; Jill Martin; Jill Jackson; Jill Jackson-Miller
- Occupations: Actor; composer; writer; author
- Years active: c. 1934–1971
- Spouses: Felix Jackson (m. 1940; div. 1944); Sy Miller (m. 1949; died 1971)
- Children: 2

Harlene Wood (born Evelyn Merchant, August 25, 1913 – April 2, 1995), known throughout her multifaceted career as Harley Wood, Jill Martin, Jill Jackson, and Jill Jackson-Miller, was an American actor, songwriter, and author. She began her career in radio before appearing in over 20 films between 1935 and 1953, primarily in supporting roles in Westerns and comedy shorts, including three with The Three Stooges.

She retired from acting, and achieved lasting international recognition as a songwriter. Using the name Jill Jackson-Miller, she co-wrote the globally recognized peace anthem "Let There Be Peace on Earth" (1955) with her husband, Sy Miller. The song became a standard for peace movements and holiday events, earning her a George Washington Honor Medal from the Freedoms Foundation.

== Early life ==
Evelyn Merchant was born on August 25, 1913, in Independence, Missouri. At the age of three, her mother died, and she was legally adopted by age twelve. She was a second cousin of the Wright brothers. When her family relocated to Armour Boulevard in Kansas City, Missouri, her education continued at Northeast High School. During her senior year (1929–1930), she was active in student council, the National Honor Society, and the drama club, including participating in the Christmas play. She attended Kansas City Junior College for two years and worked part-time at KMBC Radio. She moved to Hollywood to pursue film work in the mid-1930s.

== Career ==
=== Acting ===
She adopted the screen name Harlene Wood and was placed under contract with Columbia Pictures, later working at Republic Pictures. She appeared in over 20 films between 1935 and 1953, primarily in B-movies, Westerns, and comedy shorts where she often played small, sometimes uncredited, roles. Her screen names varied by film: she was billed as "Harley Wood" in films such as The Law Rides (1936), Law and Lead (1936), and Border Phantom (1937); she used "Harlene Wood" in Valley of Terror (1937), The Feud of the Trail (1937), and Whistling Bullets (1937). Toward the end of her acting career, she was billed as "Jill Martin" in Trigger Fingers (1939).

Her work in comedy shorts includes three 1937 films with The Three Stooges: Dizzy Doctors, Back to the Woods, and Cash and Carry. She also had credited roles in the exploitation film Marihuana (1936) and was touted by Republic Pictures as their "lovely Jill Martin, new Republic screen find". She was under a Term Players contract at Republic from August 22, 1938, through February 21, 1939, during which she appeared in four films, including bit parts in The Night Hawk (1938) and Woman Doctor (1939). After her time at Republic, she appeared in a Columbia short with Buster Keaton and the Western Trigger Fingers, both released in 1939.

=== Songwriting ===
After her film career, she experienced a period of personal difficulty, leading her to contemplate suicide. She later spoke about how, after a suicide attempt, she experienced what she described as an "eternal moment of truth" where she "knew unconditional love—which God is". This transformative experience led her to realize she was "totally loved, totally accepted" and "here for a purpose", developing her unique philosophy of peace that inspired her most famous work.

Now known as Jill Jackson, she met and married songwriter Seymour "Sy" Miller in 1949. Together, they formed a songwriting partnership and she became known as Jill Jackson-Miller.

In 1955, she was introduced to a group of international teenagers from diverse backgrounds at a retreat, and was struck by the realization that they were all "our Heavenly Father's children". She immediately wrote the lyrics for "Let There Be Peace on Earth" on an envelope, describing the experience as the words "coming through me". Sy Miller composed the melody, and official songwriting credits are shared by both. The song was initially written for and performed by the International Children's Choir, created by Easter Beakly and Arthur Granger of the Granger Dance Academy in Long Beach, California. Jackson-Miller led several rehearsals for this choir between 1955 and 1957. The song's message, "Let there be peace on earth, and let it begin with me", resonated deeply, and it became a globally recognized anthem, winning a George Washington Honor Medal from the Freedoms Foundation. The Millers wrote most of the songs for the 1971 television special Imagine That! starring Dora Hall.

== Personal life ==
Her first marriage was from 1940 to 1944 to German-born screenwriter and producer Felix Jackson, who was previously married to actor Deanna Durbin.

She married her second husband, Sy Miller, in 1949 and they remained creatively partnered until his death in 1971. She had two children. Later in life, she moved to Hawaii, where she died in Honokaʻa, on April 2, 1995, at the age of 81.

== Legacy ==
In addition to the George Washington Honor Medal, Jackson-Miller and Miller received an award from the National Conference of Christians and Jews. Their "Peace Song" ("Let There Be Peace on Earth") was featured on two Hallmark cards. They composed the theme song for People to People, an international friendship organization based in Kansas City, Missouri. The enduring message of "Let There Be Peace on Earth" led to its inclusion in the hymnals of various Christian denominations, and it is regularly used to conclude services at Unity Church each week. Jackson-Miller was involved with the International Children's Choir, including leading their rehearsals, and former child participant Roberta Haley Savage recalled, "Even as a child I knew that rehearsals with Ms. Jackson were special."

== Select filmography ==
- Marihuana (1936) as Burma
- The Law Rides (1936) as Arline Lewis
- Law and Lead (1936) as Hope Hawley
- Dizzy Doctors (1937) as Nurse (uncredited)
- Valley of Terror (1937) as Mary Scott
- The Feud of the Trail (1937) as Sheila Granger
- Whistling Bullets (1937) as Anita Saunders
- Back to the Woods (1937) as Faith (uncredited)
- Cash and Carry (1937) as Jimmie's Sister (uncredited)
- Border Phantom (1937) as Barbara Hartwell
- Hawk of the Wilderness (1938) as Beth Munro
- Scandal at Scourie (1953) as Mrs. Isabella
