= Anton Grot =

Polish art director (1884–1974)

- Grot with design for The Thief of Bagdad (1924)
- Born: Antoni Franciszek Groszewski; 18 January 1884; Kelbasin, Poland
- Died: 21 March 1974 (aged 90); Stanton, California, United States
- Occupation: Art director
- Years active: 1916-1950

Anton Grot (18 January 1884 – 21 March 1974) was a Polish art director long active in Hollywood. He was known for his prolific output with Warner Brothers, contributing, in such films as Little Caesar (1931), and Gold Diggers of 1933 to the distinctive Warners look. According to a TCM profile, he showed a "flair for harsh realism, Expressionistic horror and ornate romantic moods alike".

== Biography ==
He was born Antoni Franciszek Groszewski in Kiełbasin, Poland and died in Stanton, California. He studied at the Krakow art academy and at technical school in Königsberg, Germany, majoring in interior decoration, illustration, and design. He changed his name and emigrated to the U.S. in 1909.

The Lubin Company hired him to paint and design sets in 1913, in Philadelphia; he also worked on films for Vitagraph and Pathé. At the Pathé company, he developed his innovative techniques, along with William Cameron Menzies, in the way of using continuity sketches. His method of presenting a series of sketches of all the film's sets would later become standard practice among Art Directors, particularly with Menzies (his assistant in 1917, on The Naulahka). The cinematographer Arthur Miller remembered Anton Grot:

"a gifted and talented artist who made beautiful charcoal drawings...of the set before it was completed. All his compositions showed a full shot of each set, with all the delicate tones and shadings that suggested ideas for lighting and, in general, were of great help to me as a cameraman."

Grot arrived in Hollywood to assist Wilfred Buckland with the sets for the Douglas Fairbanks Robin Hood (1922); and stayed on, to work with Cecil B. DeMille and William K. Howard. He was eventually signed by Warner Bros., as “art director, artist, and designer", and designed 80 films before his retirement in 1948. Grot collaborated with fellow émigré, director Michael Curtiz, on 15 films. Beginning with the biblical epic Noah's Ark (1928), these included Mystery of the Wax Museum (1933), The Private Lives of Elizabeth and Essex (1939), The Sea Hawk (1940), and Mildred Pierce (1945). Grot is credited with contributing significantly to Curtiz’ personal style.

== Awards ==
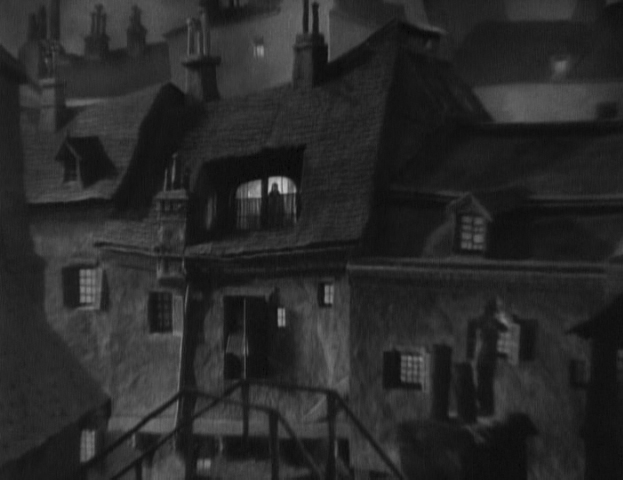
Svengali (1931)

Grot was nominated for five Academy Awards for Best Art Direction:

- The Sea Hawk (1940)
- The Private Lives of Elizabeth and Essex (1939)
- The Life of Emile Zola (1937)
- Anthony Adverse (1936)
- Svengali (1931)

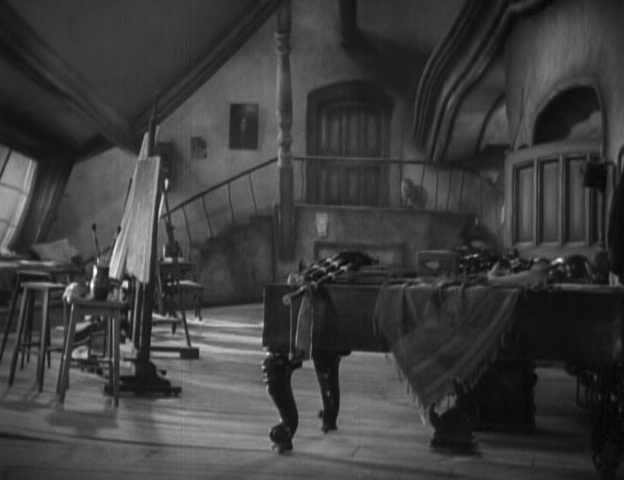
Svengali (1931)

He received a special Oscar in 1941 for inventing a water ripple and wave-illusion machine, first used in The Sea Hawk (1940).

== Filmography ==
- The Light at Dusk (1916)
- Arms and the Woman (1916)
- Sylvia of the Secret Service (1917)
- The Naulahka (1918)
- Rogues and Romance (1920)
- Robin Hood (1922)
- The Thief of Bagdad (1924)
- The Road to Yesterday (1925)
- The Volga Boatman (1926)
- Young April (1926)
- The King of Kings (1927)
- Fighting Love (1927)
- White Gold (1927)
- The Little Adventuress (1927)
- Vanity (1927)
- The Country Doctor (1927)
- A Ship Comes In (1928)
- Stand and Deliver (1928)
- The Blue Danube (1928)
- Hold 'Em Yale (1928)
- Walking Back (1928)
- Noah's Ark (1928)
- The Squall (1929)
- Smiling Irish Eyes (1929)
- Top Speed (1930)
- Bright Lights (1930)
- The Widow from Chicago (1930)
- Mothers Cry (1930)
- Going Wild (1930)
- Song of the Flame (1930)
- A Notorious Affair (1930)
- Kiss Me Again (1931)
- Little Caesar (1931)
- Body and Soul (1931)
- The Lady Who Dared (1931)
- Svengali (1931)
- Broadminded (1931)
- Side Show (1931)
- The Road to Singapore (1931)
- The Mad Genius (1931)
- Surrender (1931)
- High Pressure (1932)
- The Hatchet Man (1932)
- Alias the Doctor (1932)
- 20,000 Years in Sing Sing (1932)
- The Heart of New York (1932)
- Beauty and the Boss (1932)
- Man Wanted (1932)
- Two Seconds (1932)
- Street of Women (1932)
- Doctor X (1932)
- Two Against the World (1932)
- Big City Blues (1932)
- A Successful Calamity (1932)
- One Way Passage (1932)
- Scarlet Dawn (1932)
- The Match King (1932)
- The King's Vacation (1933)
- Mystery of the Wax Museum (1933)
- The Keyhole (1933)
- Gold Diggers of 1933 (1933)
- Baby Face (1933)
- Voltaire (1933)
- Footlight Parade (1933)
- Ever in My Heart (1933)
- From Headquarters (1933)
- Son of a Sailor (1933)
- Easy to Love (1934)
- Mandalay (1934)
- Gambling Lady (1934)
- Upper World (1934)
- He Was Her Man (1934)
- Dr. Monica (1934)
- Side Streets (1934)
- 6 Day Bike Rider (1934)
- The Firebird (1934)
- The Secret Bride (1934)
- British Agent (1934)
- Racing Luck (1935)
- Traveling Saleslady (1935)
- The Florentine Dagger (1935)
- Stranded (1935)
- Gold Diggers of 1935 (1935)
- Bright Lights (1935)
- Broadway Gondolier (1935)
- A Midsummer Night's Dream (1935)
- Dr. Socrates (1935)
- Captain Blood (1935)
- The Golden Arrow (1936)
- The White Angel (1936)
- Anthony Adverse (1936)
- Sing Me a Love Song (1936)
- Stolen Holiday (1937)
- Confession (1937)
- Tovarich (1937)
- The Great Garrick (1937)
- The Life of Emile Zola (1937)
- Fools for Scandal (1938)
- Hard to Get (1938)
- Secrets of an Actress (1938)
- They Made Me a Criminal (1939)
- Juarez (1939)
- The Private Lives of Elizabeth and Essex (1939)
- The Sea Hawk (1940)
- A Dispatch from Reuters (1940)
- The Sea Wolf (1941)
- Affectionately Yours (1941)
- Thank Your Lucky Stars (1943)
- The Conspirators (1944)
- Rhapsody in Blue (1945)
- Mildred Pierce (1945)
- One More Tomorrow (1946)
- My Reputation (1946)
- Never Say Goodbye (1946)
- Deception (1946)
- Nora Prentiss (1947)
- The Two Mrs. Carrolls (1947)
- Possessed (1947)
- The Unsuspected (1947)
- Romance on the High Seas (1948)
- June Bride (1948)
- One Sunday Afternoon (1948)
- Backfire (1950)

== See also ==
- Art Directors Guild Hall of Fame
