= Bramwell Fletcher =

English actor (1904–1988)

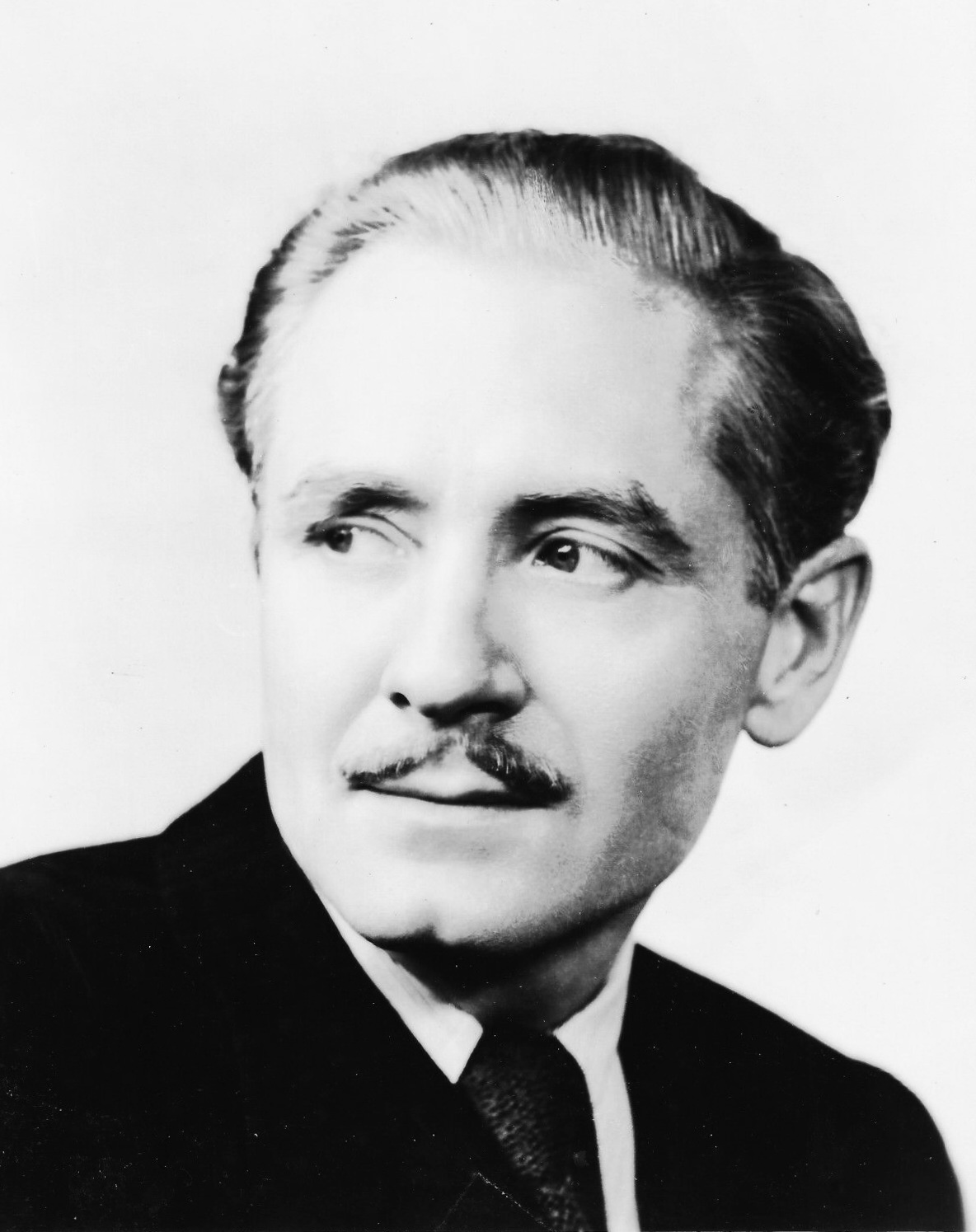
- Fletcher in 1945
- Born: 20 February 1904; Bradford, West Riding of Yorkshire, England
- Died: 22 June 1988 (aged 84); Westmoreland, New Hampshire, U.S.
- Occupation: Actor
- Years active: 1921–1965
- Spouses: Helen Chandler (m. 1935; div. 1940) Diana Barrymore (m. 1942; div. 1946) Susan Robinson (m. 1950, divorced) Lael Tucker Wertenbaker (m. 1970)
- Children: 3

Bramwell Fletcher (20 February 1904 – 22 June 1988) was an English stage, film, and television actor.

== Early years ==
Fletcher was born in Yorkshire, England, and grew up in London. His family's financial difficulties led to his working as an insurance company's office boy when he was 15 years old.

== Career ==
Fletcher's early experience in acting included acting in stock theater. He performed with the Shakespeare Company at Stratford-on-Avon for two seasons before going to New York in 1929. While in England his work in films included appearing in both the last silent film and the first talking film made in Britain.

Fletcher appeared on the stage in 1927 and made his Broadway debut portraying Kent Heathcote in Scotland Yard (1929). Hollywood and sound films soon beckoned. He made his first film in 1928, S.O.S. Fletcher co-starred in Warner Brothers' 1931 film Svengali with actor John Barrymore, whose daughter Diana would marry Fletcher a decade later. He had a brief but notable appearance in The Mummy (1932) as the assistant gone mad. In 1943, he abandoned films for the theatre and television. He wrote and acted in the critically successful 1965 play The Bernard Shaw Story. A review in The New York Times said, "The established actor has dug deeply and wisely into Shaw's articles, speeches, plays and ... come up with a remarkably adroit sort of verbalized self portrait" of Shaw. In 1974 an automobile ran over Fletcher, injuring his leg. He continued to perform in the play, first in a wheelchair, with a nurse accompanying him on stage, and later on crutches with a cast on his leg.

In February 1969 Fletcher was artist-in-residence at Eisenhower College, conducting seminars and talking informally with students.

== Personal life and death ==
Fletcher's first two wives were actresses. He married Helen Chandler on 14 February 1935, in New York City. They remained wed until 1940. He married Diana Barrymore on 30 July 1942, in Hollywood, California. They were divorced on 27 June 1946. In 1950 he married Susan Robinson and had 3 children: Whit, Kent and Catherine Fletcher. In 1970 he married Lael Tucker Wertenbaker, living with her in Nelson, New Hampshire, moving to Keene in 1985. He remained with her until his death in 1988.

Fletcher died on 24 June 1988 in the Maplewood Nursing Home in Westmoreland, New Hampshire, aged 84.

== Complete filmography ==
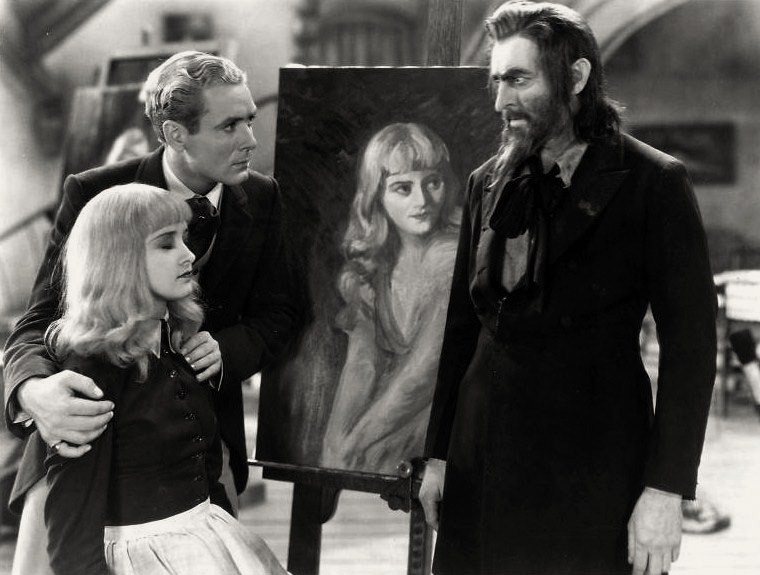
Marian Marsh, Bramwell Fletcher and John Barrymore in Svengali (1931)

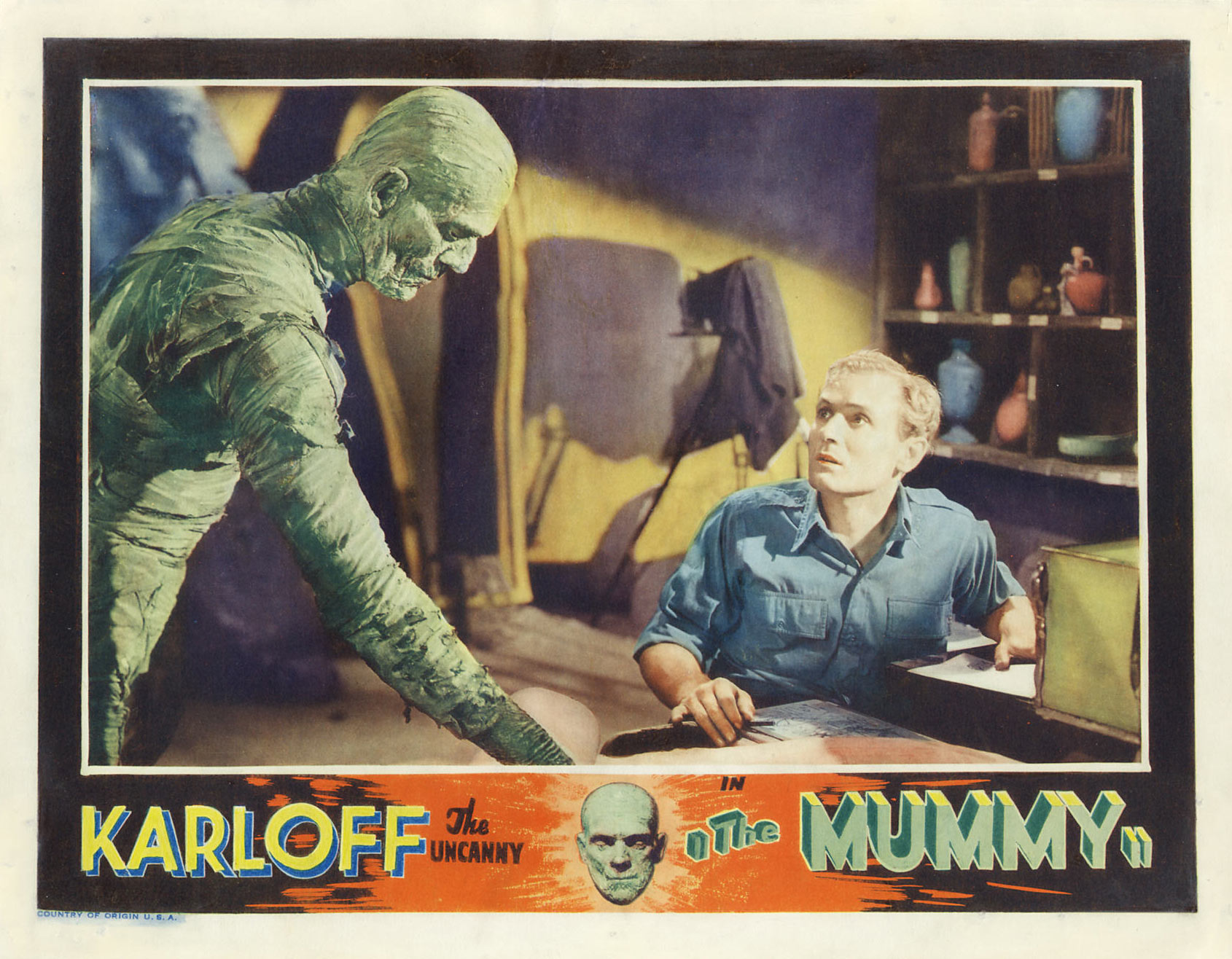
Bramwell Fletcher (right) with Boris Karloff in The Mummy (1932)

- Chick (1928) - Chick Beane
- S.O.S. (1928) - Herriott
- To What Red Hell (1929) - Jim Nolan
- So This Is London (1930) - Alfred Honeycutt
- Raffles (1930) - Bunny
- The Millionaire (1931) - Carter Andrews
- Svengali (1931) - Billee
- Men of the Sky (1931) - Eric
- Daughter of the Dragon (1931) - Ronald Petrie
- Once a Lady (1931) - Allen Corinth
- The Silent Witness (1932) - Anthony Howard
- A Bill of Divorcement (1932) - Gareth (uncredited)
- The Face on the Barroom Floor (1932) - Bill Bronson
- The Mummy (1932) - Ralph Norton
- The Monkey's Paw (1933) - Herbert White
- Only Yesterday (1933) - Scott Hughes
- The Right to Romance (1933) - Man with the Maceys
- Nana (1934) - Minor Role (uncredited)
- The Scarlet Pimpernel (1934) - The Priest
- Line Engaged (1935) - David Morland
- The Undying Monster (1942) - Dr. Jeff Colbert
- White Cargo (1942) - Wilbur Ashley
- Random Harvest (1942) - Harrison
- Immortal Sergeant (1943) - Symes
- Bread of Freedom (1952 TV movie)
- Drama into Opera: Oedipus Rex (1961 TV movie)
