= Nana Bryant =

American actress (1888–1955)

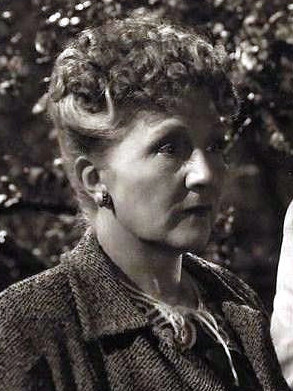
- Bryant in 1948
- Born: Nana Irene Bryant; November 23, 1888; Cincinnati, Ohio, U.S.
- Died: December 24, 1955 (aged 67); Hollywood, California, U.S.
- Resting place: Valhalla Memorial Park Cemetery
- Occupation: Actress
- Years active: 1912-1955
- Spouse(s): Ted MacLean; Cliff Thompson
- Children: 1

Nana Irene Bryant (November 23, 1888 – December 24, 1955) was an American film, stage, and television actress. She appeared in more than 100 films between 1935 and 1955.

== Biography ==
Bryant was born on November 23, 1888, in Cincinnati, Ohio. After "an excellent musical education", she debuted on state in a Cincinnati stock theater company. She headed a repertory troupe that toured the middle United States before she became the leading woman in a California stock company. She eventually "became an established favorite in San Francisco, Los Angeles, and other Pacific Coast cities" for six years. She performed in leading vocal roles in Topsy and Eva in Chicago and California and was a featured singer with the Tivoli Opera Company in San Francisco.

She appeared in stock companies in Los Angeles and San Francisco, and spent several seasons on tour. She also played on Broadway, appearing in the role of Morgan le Fay in Rodgers and Hart's A Connecticut Yankee, before working in films. Her other Broadway credits included Marriage Is for Single People (1945), Baby Pompadour (1934), A Ship Comes In (1934), The First Apple (1933), The Dubarry (1932), The Stork is Dead (1932), Heigh-Ho, Everybody (1932), The Padre (1926), The Wild Rose (1926), No More Women (1926), The Firebrand (1924).

In 1935, Bryant went to Hollywood to work under contract to Columbia Pictures Corporation. She remained on the West Coast until 1950, when she began doing a daily television program in New York. She returned to Hollywood in 1953.

Bryant had a supporting role in the Frank Morgan Show, a summer replacement for Jack Benny's program in 1946.

On television, she played Connie's mother in The First Hundred Years and Mrs. Nestor in Our Miss Brooks. She also made several appearances as the mother of Margaret Williams (Jean Hagen) during the first three seasons of Make Room for Daddy.

Bryant appeared for the first time in a musical role October 1 to November 1, 1912 in The Man Who Owns Broadway at Morosco's Burbank Theatre, produced by David M. Hartford. Her role was Sylvia, Anthony Bridwell's daughter. She sang "Song of the Soul" in Act 1 and I'm in love with one of the stars. She was accompanied by Sophia Caldwell of Wheeling, West Virginia; Caldwell was then studying for the opera.

== Personal life ==
Bryant married writer Ted MacLean when she was 17 years old; they had a son and were divorced in 1915. She later wed actor Cliff Thompson, and they were divorced in 1932. She died on December 25, 1955, in her apartment in Hollywood, California, aged 67.

== Partial filmography ==
Year	Film	Role	Notes
1935	Unknown Woman	Aunt Mary	
1935	Atlantic Adventure	Joan Hill	Uncredited
1935	A Feather in Her Hat	Lady Drake	
1935	Guard That Girl	Sarah	
1935	Crime and Punishment	Madam	Uncredited
1935	One Way Ticket	Mrs. Bourne	
1935	The Lone Wolf Returns	Aunt Julie Stewart	
1936	You May Be Next	Miss Abbott	
1936	Lady of Secrets	Aunt Harriet	
1936	The King Steps Out	Louise	
1936	Meet Nero Wolfe	Sarah Barstow	
1936	Blackmailer	Mrs. Lindsay	
1936	The Man Who Lived Twice	Margaret Schuyler	
1936	Theodora Goes Wild	Ethel Stevenson	
1936	Pennies from Heaven	Miss Howard	
1937	Let's Get Married	Mrs. Willoughby	
1937	The League of Frightened Men	Agnes Burton	
1937	The Devil Is Driving	Mrs. Sanders	
1937	A Dangerous Adventure	Marie	
1937	Counsel for Crime	Mrs. Maddox	
1938	Man-Proof	Meg Swift	
1938	Midnight Intruder	Mrs. John Clark Reitter Sr.	
1938	The Adventures of Tom Sawyer	Mrs. Thatcher	
1938	Mad About Music	Louise Fusenot	
1938	Sinners in Paradise	Mrs. Franklin Sydney	
1938	Give Me a Sailor	Mrs. Minnie Brewster	
1938	Always in Trouble	Mrs. Minnie Darlington	
1938	Out West with the Hardys	Dora Northcote	
1938	Peck's Bad Boy with the Circus	Mrs. Henry Peck	
1938	Swing, Sister, Swing	Hyacinth Hepburn	
1939	Lincoln in the White House	Mary Todd Lincoln	Short film; uncredited
1939	Street of Missing Men	Mrs. Putnam	
1939	Parents on Trial	Margaret Ames	
1939	Espionage Agent	Mrs. Corvall	
1939	Our Neighbors – The Carters	Louise Wilcox	
1940	Brother Rat and a Baby	Mrs. Harper	
1940	If I Had My Way	Marian Johnson	
1940	A Little Bit of Heaven	Mom	
1940	Father Is a Prince	Susan Bower	
1941	The Reluctant Dragon	Mrs. Benchley	
1941	Nice Girl?	Mary Peasley	
1941	Thieves Fall Out	Martha Matthews	
1941	One Foot in Heaven	Mrs. Morris	
1941	Public Enemies	Emma	
1941	The Corsican Brothers	Madame Dupre	
1942	Calling Dr. Gillespie	Mrs. Marshall Todwell	
1942	Get Hep to Love	Aunt Addie	
1942	Youth on Parade	Agatha Frost	
1942	Thunder Birds	Mrs. Blake	
1942	Madame Spy	Alicia Rolf	
1943	Hangmen Also Die!	Mrs. Hellie Novotny	
1943	Get Going	Mrs. Daughtery	
1943	Best Foot Forward	Mrs. Dalrymple	
1943	The West Side Kid	Mrs. Winston	
1943	Princess O'Rourke	Mrs. Mulvaney	Uncredited
1943	The Song of Bernadette	Mere Imbert	Uncredited
1944	The Adventures of Mark Twain	Mrs. Langdon	
1944	Jungle Woman	Miss Gray – Nurse	
1944	Bathing Beauty	Dean Clinton	
1944	Take It or Leave It	Miss Burke	
1944	Marriage Is a Private Affair	Nurse	
1944	Can't Help Singing	Mrs. Carstairs	Uncredited
1945	Brewster's Millions	Mrs. Gray	
1945	Week-End at the Waldorf	Mrs. H. Davenport Drew	
1945	Black Market Babies	Mrs. Grace Andrews	
1946	The Virginian	Mrs. Wood	Uncredited
1946	The Runaround	Mrs. Mildred Hampton	
1946	Big Town	Mrs. Crane	
1947	The Perfect Marriage	Corinne Williams	
1947	Millie's Daughter	Mrs. Cooper Austin	
1947	The Big Fix	Mrs. Carter	
1947	Possessed	Pauline Graham	Uncredited
1947	The Hal Roach Comedy Carnival	Mrs. Cornelius Belmont Sr.	Segment: Fabulous Joe
1947	The Fabulous Joe	Mrs. Belmont	
1947	The Unsuspected	Mrs. White	
1947	Her Husband's Affairs	Mrs. Winterbottom	
1947	Dangerous Years	Miss Templeton	
1948	Goodbye, Miss Turlock	Miss Turlock	Short film; uncredited
1948	Reaching from Heaven	Kay Bradley	
1948	On Our Merry Way	Housekeeper	Deleted sequence; uncredited
1948	Stage Struck	Mrs. Howard	
1948	Eyes of Texas	Hattie Waters	
1948	Lady at Midnight	Lydia Forsythe	
1948	Inner Sanctum	Mrs. Mitchell	
1948	The Return of October	Cousin Therese	
1948	The Kissing Bandit	Nun	Uncredited
1948	Ladies of the Chorus	Mrs. Adele Carroll	
1949	State Department: File 649	Peggy Brown	
1949	Hideout	Sybil Elwood Kaymeer	
1949	The Lady Gambles	Mrs. Dennis Sutherland	
1950	The Blonde Bandit	Mrs. Henley	
1950	Key to the City	Mrs. Cabot	Uncredited
1950	I Was a Shoplifter	Aunt Clara	Uncredited
1950	A Modern Marriage	Mrs. Brown	
1950	Three Secrets	Mrs. Gilwyn, Supervisor of 'The Shelter'	Uncredited
1950	Let's Dance	Mrs. Bryant	Uncredited
1950	Harvey	Mrs. Hazel Chumley	
1950	The Du Pont Story	Elizabeth du Pont	
1951	A Modern Marriage	Mrs. Brown	
1951	Follow the Sun	Sister Beatrice	
1951	Only the Valiant	Mrs. Drumm	
1951	Bright Victory	Mrs. Claire Nevins	
1953	Geraldine	Dean Blake	
1954	About Mrs. Leslie	Mrs. McKay	
1954	The Outcast	Mrs. Banner	Also known as The Fortune Hunter
1955	The Private War of Major Benson	Mother Redempta	
