= Cinemagundi Club =

Hollywood club for art directors

the Cinemagundi Club was formed in 1924 by 63 top Hollywood art directors including William Cameron Menzies and Anton Grot. It was named after New York City’s club for artists, the Salmagundi Club.

The group was primarily an informal gathering of artisans intent on letting the world at large know the extent of their contributions.

Through the years, the Cinemagundi Club developed into a forum for Production Designers and Art Directors to exchange views and to discuss problems.

The 1930s were bleak times, however, for Art Directors and other industry craft artists who were not being given proper credit for the important creative contributions they made to the art of filmmaking. That attitude dramatically changed in 1939 with Gone With the Wind, when producer David O. Selznick agreed to give the new credit of “Production Designer” to William Cameron Menzies for his brilliant work on the classic film. Menzies (the dean of U.S. film art direction at the time) produced scene-by-scene storyboards and illustrations for Gone With the Wind that revolutionized the film industry. They demonstrated the vital role that production design plays in the overall look of a theatrical motion picture, establishing practices still in use today.

in 1937, the Club transformed itself into the Society of Motion Picture Art Directors. "Television" was added to its name 30 years later.

After World War II, the Society of Motion Picture & Television Art Directors signed on with the IATSE for overall union representation, and then changed their name to the Art Directors Guild in 2000.
