= The Road to Singapore =

1931 film

- Directed by: Alfred E. Green
- Screenplay by: Grubb Alexander
- Based on: Heat Wave; 1929 play by Roland Pertwee; 1930 novel Denise Robins
- Starring: William Powell; Doris Kenyon; Marian Marsh
- Cinematography: Robert Kurrle
- Edited by: William Holmes
- Production company: Warner Bros. Pictures
- Distributed by: Warner Bros. Pictures
- Release date: September 30, 1931
- Running time: 70 minutes
- Country: United States
- Language: English

The Road to Singapore is a 1931 American pre-Code romantic drama film directed by Alfred E. Green and starring William Powell and Doris Kenyon, who play two thirds of a romantic triangle, along with Louis Calhern. It was produced and distributed by Warner Bros. Pictures. The film's sets were designed by the art director Anton Grot. This film is preserved by the Library of Congress.

== Plot ==
On an ocean liner from Colombo to Singapore, black sheep Hugh Dawltry tries, but fails to become better acquainted with fellow passenger Philippa Crosby. He is pleasantly surprised to find that they are both getting off at Khota. Ashore, she rebuffs his advances again, informing him that she has come to marry Dr. George March, Dawltry's neighbor.

Philippa is sorely disappointed by her marriage, however. George is utterly wrapped up in his work, and does not even take her on a honeymoon. As time goes by, the neglected, unhappy woman begins to find Dawltry more and more attractive. One night, the drums start playing in the native villages, signalling four days of marriages. Both Phillipa and Dawltry self reflect and find the drums and their thoughts for each other alluring.

So does George's 18-year-old sister Rene. Most of the expatriate community shuns him for his involvement in a scandalous, widely publicized divorce.

One day, George plans to take a patient with a very rare disease to Colombo. Dawltry takes the opportunity to invite Philippa to dinner. Before that time, Rene invites herself into his bungalow. When she refuses to leave, Dawltry frightens her into fleeing by sweeping her up in his arms and carrying her into his bedroom. George sees her leave and confronts his sister about being at George's house. She said she was there to borrow records. George forces Rene into accompanying him in his trip and when he sees Dawltry, he threatens to return with a gun.

Philippa shows up at the appointed time at Dawltry's house. They admit their feelings and Dawltry talks about his past, inviting her to join him on a sailing ship the next day.

Meanwhile, the patient dies and George cancels his trip, much to Rene's delight. George seems more concerned about not being photographed with the patient. Returning home, Rene finds Phillipa's invitation and tries to hide it. George demands to see it, takes his pistol, and goes to retrieve his wife. After confronting Dawltry again, in which Dawltry tries to shield her, Phillipa appears. She tells him she is leaving him because he is cold, that any woman can take her place and that he is more concerned over scandal than any concern for her. Phillipa drives off in their car. Dawltry dresses and sets out after her. As he leaves, he tells George it is his last chance, but George is unable to pull the trigger.

== Cast ==
- William Powell as Hugh Dawltry
- Doris Kenyon as Philippa Crosby March
- Marian Marsh as Rene March
- Louis Calhern as Dr. George March
- Alison Skipworth as Mrs. Wey-Smith
- Lumsden Hare as Mr. Wey-Smith
- Tyrell Davis as Nikki
- A. E. Anson as Dr. Muir
- Colin Campbell as Reginald
- Arthur Clayton as Mr. Everard
- Douglas Gerrard as Simpson
- Margarita Martín as Ayah
- Ethel Griffies as Mrs. Everard
- Harrington Reynolds as Duckworth
- Amar N. Sharma as Khan, Dawltry's Servant
- Huspin Ansari as Ali, March's Servant
- May Beatty as Bridge Player on Ship
- Carrie Daumery as Birthday Party Guest
