= Stranded (1935 film) =

1935 American drama film directed by Frank Borzage

- Directed by: Frank Borzage
- Written by: Delmer Daves; Carl Erickson (add. dialogue)
- Based on: story "Lady with a Badge" by Frank Wead and Ferdinand Reyher
- Produced by: Frank Borzage
- Starring: Kay Francis; George Brent; Patricia Ellis
- Cinematography: Sidney Hickox
- Edited by: William Holmes
- Music by: Leo F. Forbstein
- Production company: Warner Bros. Pictures
- Distributed by: Warner Bros. Pictures/The Vitaphone Corporation
- Release date: June 19, 1935 (New York City)
- Running time: 72-78 minutes
- Country: United States
- Language: English

Stranded is a 1935 American drama film directed by Frank Borzage and starring Kay Francis, George Brent and Patricia Ellis.

The film's sets were designed by the art director Anton Grot.

== Plot ==
Lynn Palmer is a volunteer for Travelers Aid in San Francisco who goes out of her way to help for immigrants, travelers, the unemployed and the homeless. Mack Hale is a construction manager on the Golden Gate Bridge (which would not be completed until 1937), who comes to Lynn's station seeking information about a worker he wants to hire. Lynn and Mack are attracted to each other, despite their different personalities and outlook. Lynn's roommate, Velma Tuthill, is the daughter of one of the bridge's backers and is also attracted to Mack.

Lynn and Mack date, even though he is often put off by how she turns her attentions to people he thinks are unworthy. In the meantime, Mack comes under pressure from a protection racket mob led by "Sharkey". Sharkey bribes and manipulates some workers to create dangerous conditions that cause Mack to fire them. Though Mack has proposed marriage, Lynn rejects his demand that she quit her work helping others. Mack, however, is threatened with a walkout by the workers over his apparent callousness and accusations that he caused a worker's death, all instigated by Sharkey. At a workers' meeting, Lynn helps to expose Sharkey's plot and clear Mack's name with the men, who turn on Sharkey. Mack admits to Lynn that he was wrong to look down on others less fortunate than himself, and the two are reunited with the promise that they can each devote themselves to the work each cares for.

== Cast ==
- Kay Francis as Lynn Palmer
- George Brent as Mack Hale
- Patricia Ellis as Velma Tuthill
- Donald Woods as John Wesley
- Robert Barrat as Stanislaus Janauschek
- Barton MacLane as Sharkey
- Joseph Crehan as Johnny Quinn
- William Harrigan as Updyke
- Henry O'Neill as Mr. Tuthill
- Frankie Darro as James "Jimmy" Rivers
- John Wray as Mike Gibbons
- Edward McWade as Tim Powers
- June Travis as Mary Rand
- Ann Shoemaker as Mrs. Tuthill
- Gavin Gordon as Jack
- Spencer Charters as Boatman
- Joan Gay as Diane Nichols
- Adrian Morris as Rivet Boss

== Reception ==
The New York Times reviewer called Stranded "a mobile drama which manages to be quite unbelievable and generally entertaining. ... The picture's chief virtue is its sense of humor."
