= John Holland (actor, born 1908) =

American actor and singer (1908–1993)

- John Holland in Perry Mason 1959
- Born: Harold Boggess; May 16, 1908; Fremont, Nebraska, United States
- Died: May 21, 1993 (aged 85); Los Angeles, California, US
- Occupations: Actor, singer
- Years active: 1937–1986
- Notable credit(s): Chinatown, My Fair Lady

Harold Boggess (May 16, 1908 – May 21, 1993), who used the stage name John Holland, was an American actor and singer.

== Biography ==
John Holland was born in Fremont, Nebraska. He adopted his grandfather's name John Holland as a stage name. He trained as a baritone with voice teacher Sidney Dietch. He began acting in Hollywood films in 1937, and later appeared on numerous television series, including Hawaiian Eye, Wagon Train, and Perry Mason. His most notable film credits were My Fair Lady (1964), How to Succeed in Business Without Really Trying (1967), and Chinatown (1974).

In addition to film and television, Holland acted in musical theater, such as the Broadway production of Peter Pan (1954), and in plays, such as the touring company of The Caine Mutiny Court-Martial. He received positive reviews for his performance in a concert titled "The California Night of Music" in Los Angeles in September 1937. He often gave free concerts during visits to his parents in Alton, Illinois, accompanied by his father, organist Newton Boggess.

John Holland died on May 21, 1993, in Woodland Hills, Los Angeles, five days past his 85th birthday.

== Selected filmography ==
=== Film ===
- Larceny on the Air (1937) - Druggist (uncredited)
- Join the Marines (1937) - Lieutenant
- Dick Tracy (1937) - Anderson's Secretary (uncredited)
- Paradise Express (1937) - Gus
- Circus Girl (1937) - Reporter
- Balalaika (1939) - (uncredited)
- Up in the Air (1940) - Quigley
- Phantom of Chinatown (1940) - Mason
- The Green Hornet Strikes Again! (1940) - Grinson, Foreign Agent [Ch. 2] (uncredited)
- Pot o' Gold (1941) - Sponsor (uncredited)
- Sky Raiders (1941) - Hess, Henchman
- Pals of the Pecos (1941) - Jim Buckley
- Roar of the Press (1941) - Robert Mallon
- Adventure in Washington (1941) - Desk Clerk (uncredited)
- Our Wife (1941) - Steward (uncredited)
- Gentleman from Dixie (1941) - Brawley
- Dangerous Lady (1941) - Guy Kisling
- Uncle Joe (1941) - Paul Darcey
- Don Winslow of the Navy (1942) - Paul Barsac
- Mr. and Mrs. North (1942) - Party Guest (uncredited)
- Yokel Boy (1942) - Rod La Tour (uncredited)
- House of Errors (1942) - Paul Gordon
- We Were Dancing (1942) - Hubert's Friend (uncredited)
- Take a Letter, Darling (1942) - Secretary
- She's in the Army (1942) - Wally Lundigan, Columnist
- Submarine Raider (1942) - Bryan (uncredited)
- Eagle Squadron (1942) - Fire Warden (uncredited)
- Beyond the Blue Horizon (1942) - Herrick (uncredited)
- Flight Lieutenant (1942) - Officer (uncredited)
- Invisible Agent (1942) - Spencer's Secretary (uncredited)
- Call of the Canyon (1942) - Willy Hitchcock
- The Palm Beach Story (1942) - Member of Wedding Party (uncredited)
- Lucky Legs (1942) - Fur Salesman (uncredited)
- Big Town After Dark (1947) - District Attorney Harding (uncredited)
- The Voice of the Turtle (1947) - Henry Atherton
- King of the Gamblers (1948) - Symonds
- Romance on the High Seas (1948) - Best Man (uncredited)
- Blonde Ice (1948) - Carl Hanneman
- Sons of Adventure (1948) - Paul Kenyon
- Behind Locked Doors (1948) - Dr. J.R. Bell (uncredited)
- The Three Musketeers (1948) - Aramis' Friend (uncredited)
- My Dear Secretary (1948) - Mr. Hudson (uncredited)
- State Department: File 649 (1949) - Ballinger
- Tulsa (1949) - Reporter (uncredited)
- Law of the Golden West (1949) - Quentin Morell
- Massacre River (1949) - Roberts
- Rock Island Trail (1950) - Major Porter
- Second Chance (1950) - Dr. Matthews
- Rio Grande Patrol (1950) - Fowler
- Belle Le Grand (1951) - John's Friend (uncredited)
- Man of Conflict (1953) - Doctor
- Jubilee Trail (1954) - Mr. Drake (uncredited)
- King Richard and the Crusaders (1954) - Castelaine Man-at-Arms (uncredited)
- Street of Sinners (1957) - Harry
- The Girl in Black Stockings (1957) - Norman Grant
- A Lust to Kill (1958) - Mayor Jonathan W. McKenzie
- Bells Are Ringing (1960) - Party Guest (uncredited)
- Ocean's 11 (1960) - Minor Role (scenes deleted)
- The High Powered Rifle (1960) - District Attorney
- The Little Shepherd of Kingdom Come (1961) (uncredited)
- Moon Pilot (1962) - Joe McCord (uncredited)
- The Couch (1962) - Vendor (uncredited)
- Air Patrol (1962) - Arthur Murcott
- Police Nurse (1963) - Edward Mayhall
- A Gathering of Eagles (1963) - Lord Beresford, S.A.C. Observer
- The Madmen of Mandoras (1963) - Professor John Coleman
- The Prize (1963) - Awards Ceremony Speaker (uncredited)
- Open the Door and See All the People (1964) - Antoine
- My Fair Lady (1964) - Butler
- My Blood Runs Cold (1965) - Mr. Courtland
- The Naked Brigade (1965) - Major Hamilton
- The Oscar (1966) - Stevens
- How to Succeed in Business Without Really Trying (1967) - Matthews
- Topaz (1969) - State Department Official #2 (uncredited)
- 1776 (1972) - William Whipple (NH) (uncredited)
- Lost in the Stars (1974) - Van Jarsdale
- Chinatown (1974) - Farmer in the Valley #1
- The Strongest Man in the World (1975) - Regent (uncredited)
- From Noon Till Three (1976) - Song Publisher (uncredited)
- Joni (1979) - Del Vecchio
- Fear No Evil (1981) - Rafael / Father Damon

=== Television ===
- The Honeymooners (1955) - Tony Amico
- Make Room for Daddy (1957)
- Death Valley Days (1957-1960) - Bellingham / Duke Jordan / James Anders
- Perry Mason (1957-1966) - Bruno Grant / Leonard Voss / Clinton Forbes / Carver Clement / Phillip Walsh
- Sugarfoot (1958) - Clay Blackton
- Tales of Wells Fargo (1959) (Episode: "Lola Montez") - Chris Hurley
- Have Gun – Will Travel (1959-1962) - the Colonel / Cortwright
- Wagon Train (1959-1965) - Professor Sheffield / Mr. Rollins / Ellington
- The Third Man (1959-1963) - Walter Strickland / Paul Price
- Alfred Hitchcock Presents (1960) (Season 5 Episode 38: "Hooked") - Mr. Foster
- Tombstone Territory (1960)
- Maverick (1960) - Farnsworth McCoy / Terence Tamblyn / Tall Man
- Hawaiian Eye (1961-1962) - Christopher / Harvey Hawley / Mr. Kendall
- Adam's Rib (1973) - Judge McElroy
- Battlestar Galactica (1978-1979) - Waiter
- Crossings (1986) - Captain St. John (final television appearance)
