= Lady of Secrets =

1936 film by Marion Gering

- Directed by: Marion Gering
- Written by: Zoe Akins; Joseph Anthony; Katharine Brush
- Produced by: B.P. Schulberg
- Starring: Ruth Chatterton; Otto Kruger; Lionel Atwill
- Cinematography: Ted Tetzlaff
- Edited by: Viola Lawrence
- Music by: Howard Jackson
- Production company: Columbia Pictures
- Distributed by: Columbia Pictures
- Release date: February 21, 1936
- Running time: 73 minutes
- Country: United States
- Language: English

Lady of Secrets is a 1936 American drama film directed by Marion Gering and starring Ruth Chatterton, Otto Kruger and Lionel Atwill.

== Plot ==
Celia Whittaker, a reclusive socialite who has long eschewed romantic opportunities, learns her younger sister Joan intends to marry David Eastman, an older author and professor, though she is truly in love with Richard, a fledgling doctor. Meeting David before learning he is her fiancée, she learns he is not fully in love with her either. Despite this circumstance, their domineering father insists on seeing the wedding go forward, to the point of attempting to have Celia confined to her home against her will. In a flashback, the roots of Celia's behavior of melancholy isolation are revealed.

== Partial cast ==
- Ruth Chatterton as Celia Whittaker
- Otto Kruger as David Eastman
- Lionel Atwill as Mr. Whittaker
- Marian Marsh as Joan Whittaker
- Lloyd Nolan as Michael
- Robert Allen as Richard Terrance
- Elisabeth Risdon as Mrs. Emily Whittaker
- Nana Bryant as Aunt Harriet
- Esther Dale as Miss Eccles

== Bibliography ==
- James Monaco. The Encyclopedia of Film. Perigee Books, 1991.
