= Cliff Henderson =

American air racer

- Aviation promoter & real estate developer Cliff Henderson, c. 1933
- Born: Clifford William Henderson; July 11, 1895; Lenox, Iowa, U.S.
- Died: March 26, 1984 (aged 88); Rancho Mirage, California, U.S.
- Known for: National Air Races (director); Palm Desert, California (founder)
- Spouse: Marian Marsh (m. 1960)

Clifford "Cliff" Henderson (1895–1984) was the managing director of the National Air Races from 1928 through 1939. Described as "the Barnum of aviation," he obtained sponsors for two of the most well-known air races of the period, the Bendix transcontinental and the Thompson closed-course classics. The Thompson Trophy was first awarded in 1929. The 1929 National Air Races included the first official women-only event, the Women's Air Derby, a cross-country race from Los Angeles to Cleveland, Ohio. In 1931, he convinced businessman Vincent Bendix to sponsor the Bendix Trophy Race, a transcontinental speed dash open to men and women. Henderson was awarded the L'Ordre de 'Etoile Noire de Benin for his service in World War II as the U.S. Air Force Military Commissioner of Dakar.

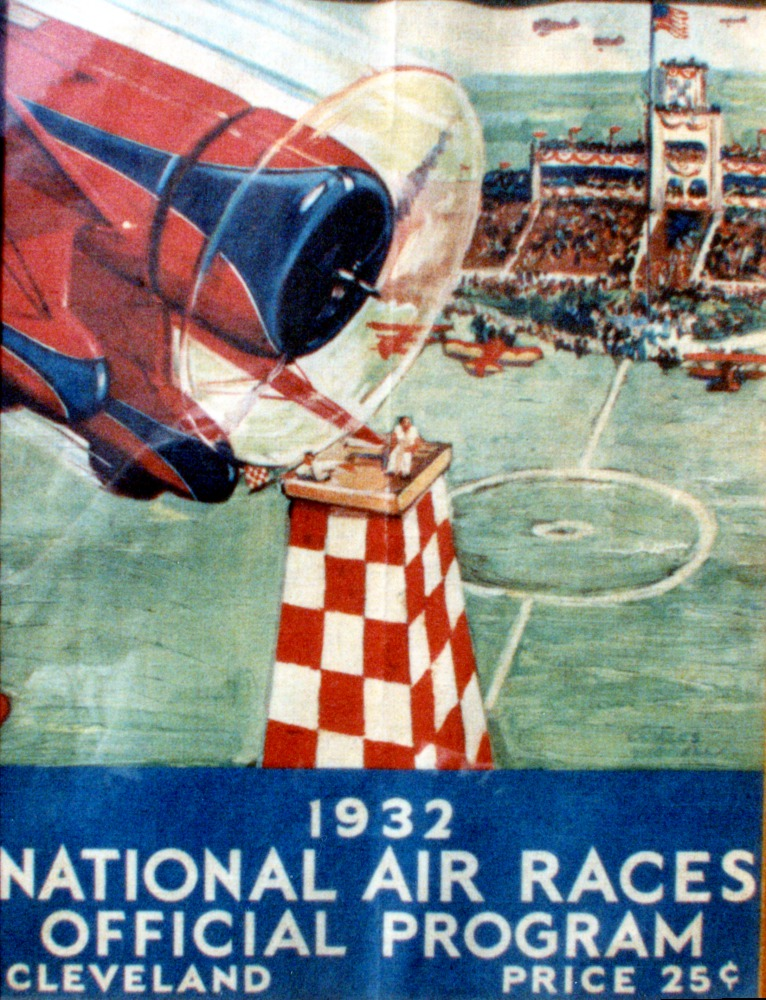
Wedell Williams Model 44 II Poster, 1932 National Air Races. Source: Charles Daniels Photo Collection, San Diego Air and Space Museum

With his brother Phillip, Henderson built the Pan-Pacific Auditorium in 1935. The landmark Streamline Moderne convention center, designed by Los Angeles architects Wurdeman & Becket, was the region's primary indoor venue with 100,000 square feet of exhibition space and seating for up to 6,000. It closed after the 1972 opening of the much larger Los Angeles Convention Center.

Henderson and his brother Randall founded Palm Desert, California in the 1940s, envisioning a modern utopia growing from the scrub. He built the Shadow Mountain Club in 1948. With its glamorous figure-eight swimming pool and high-dive competitions, the club drew celebrities, presidents, and future residents.

== Personal life ==
Henderson was born in Lenox, Iowa. He attended University of Southern California and graduated in 1917. His service in World War I was first with the 35th Ambulance Unit (France), then he became a pilot in the 101st Aero Squadron. He returned to Los Angeles after the war. In 1924 he administered ground operations at Clover Field for US Army (Around the World Flight, 1924). He continued with ground operations at Los Angeles Airport, serving as Director from 1928. He then promoted aviation through competitive air races including the National Air Races which he directed until 1939.

In World War II, Henderson served in the US Army Air Corps, rising to the rank of colonel. He was involved in planning the Burma Hump air route, and also served as military governor of Dakar in North Africa.

Henderson was a member of the Quiet Birdmen, a male-only aviators' social club. Henderson was married twice. His first wife, Helen Christine Avery, died in 1929. Henderson married actress Marian Marsh in 1960. He died on March 26, 1984, in Rancho Mirage near Palm Desert.

== Legacy ==
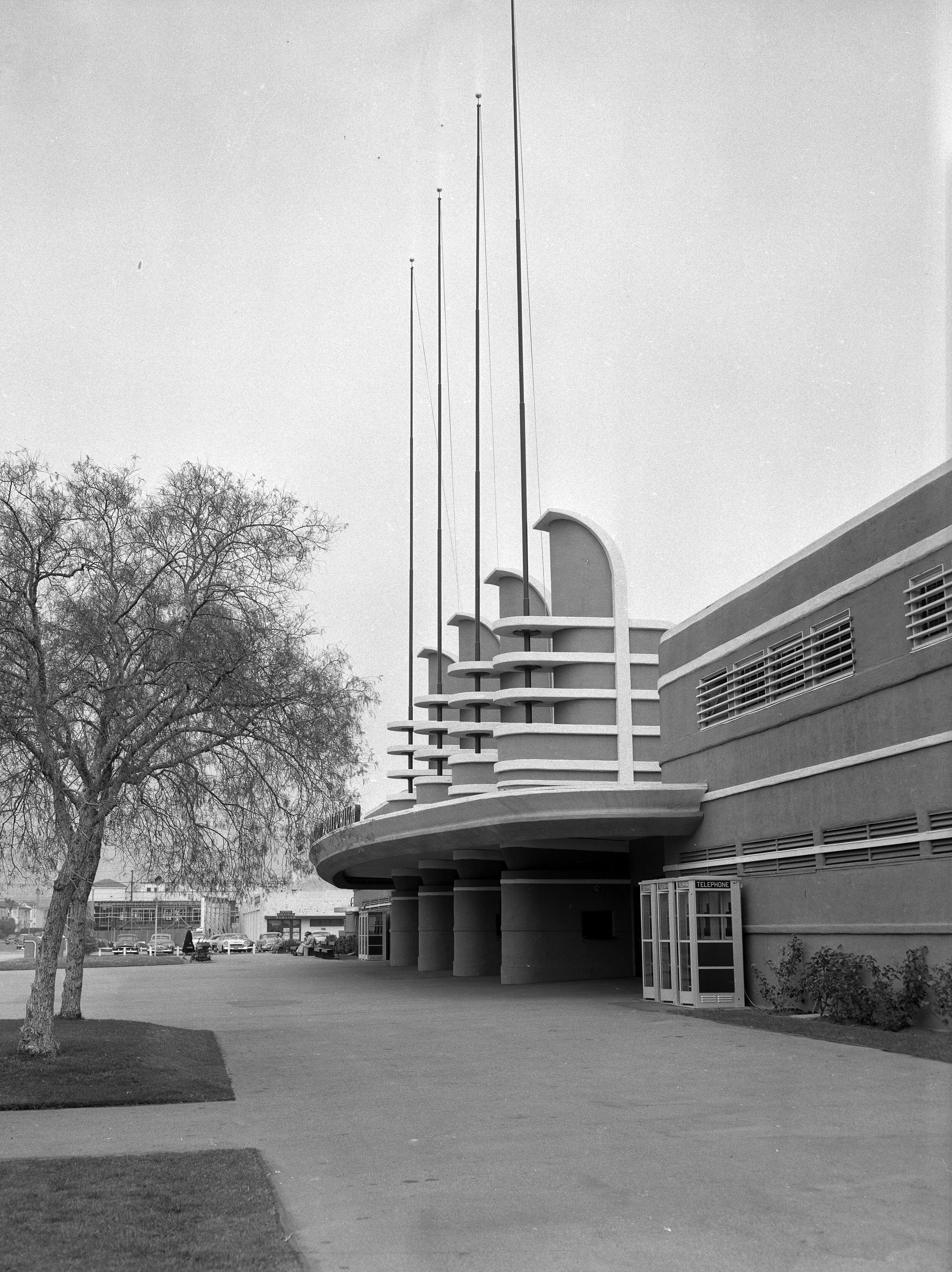
Pan-Pacific Auditorium, 1956. Source: Los Angeles Times photographic archive, UCLA Library.

The National Aeronautic Association presents an annual Cliff Henderson Award for Achievement. The award is given to a living individual or group whose vision, leadership, or skill has made a significant and lasting contribution to the promotion and advancement of aviation or space activity. Notable recipients of the Cliff Henderson Trophy include Wesley L. McDonald, Walter J. Boyne, Thomas H. Miller, and Eugene Peyton Deatrick.

In 1978, a bust of Henderson was completed and dedicated in Palm Desert. The bust, by Henry McCann, serves as a tribute to Henderson's role as an early developer of the city.

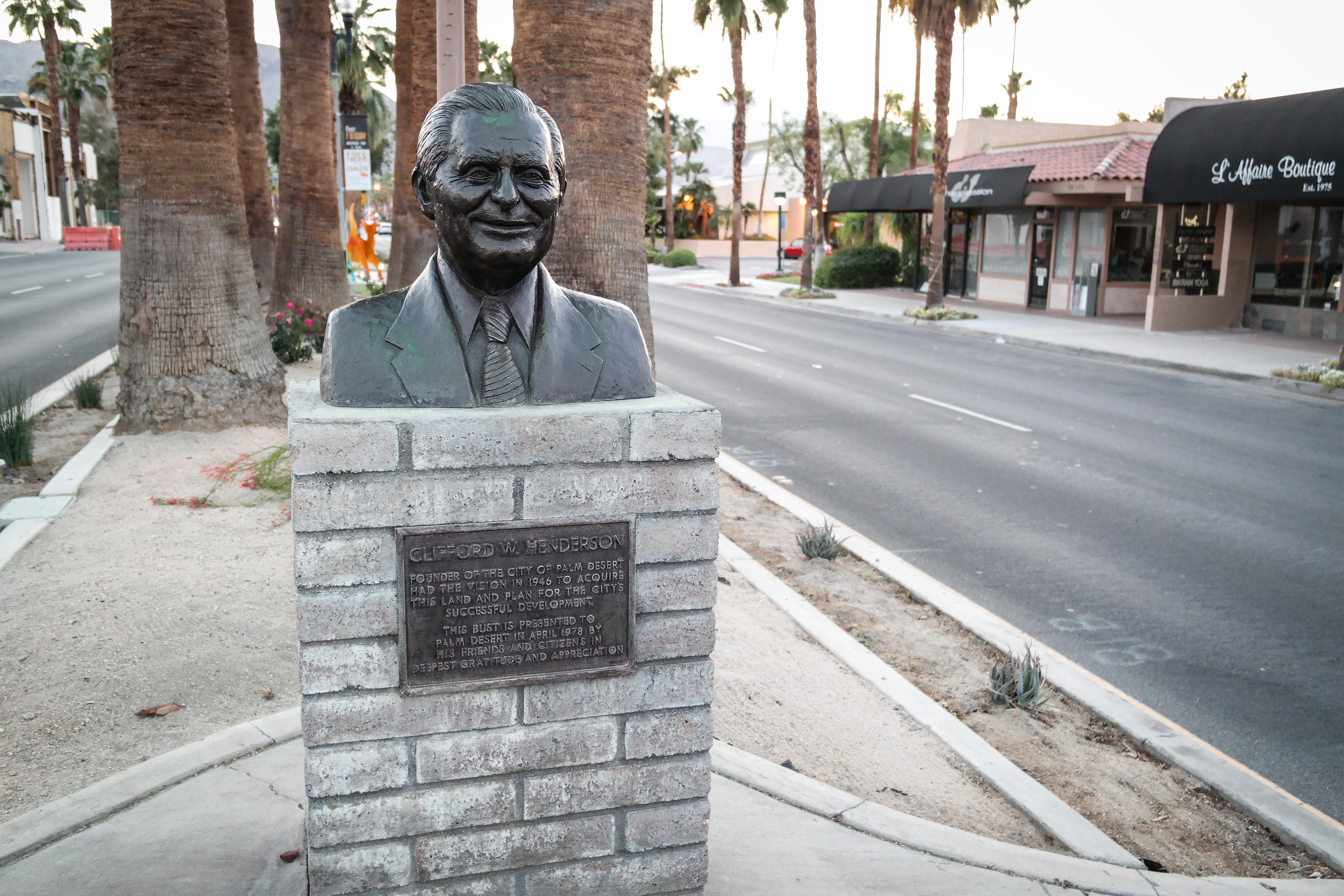
Bust of Palm Desert, California, founder Clifford W. Henderson.
