= The Mad Genius =

1931 film

- Theatrical release poster
- Directed by: Michael Curtiz
- Written by: Harvey Thew; J. Grubb Alexander
- Based on: The Idol; 1929 play by Martin Brown
- Starring: John Barrymore; Marian Marsh; Donald Cook; Charles Butterworth
- Cinematography: Barney McGill
- Edited by: Ralph Dawson
- Music by: David Mendoza conducting the Vitaphone Orchestra
- Production company: Warner Bros. Pictures
- Distributed by: Warner Bros. Pictures
- Release date: November 7, 1931
- Running time: 89 minutes
- Country: United States
- Language: English
- Budget: $441,000
- Box office: $400,000

The Mad Genius is a 1931 American pre-Code drama film produced and distributed by Warner Bros. and directed by Michael Curtiz. The film stars John Barrymore, Marian Marsh, Donald Cook, Charles Butterworth, and in small roles, Boris Karloff and Frankie Darro. The film is based on the 1929 play The Idol by Martin Brown, which opened in Great Neck, Long Island but never opened on Broadway.

== Plot ==
A crippled puppeteer, Ivan Tsarakov, is frustrated that he will never dance ballet. He adopts a protégé, Fedor Ivanoff, whom he makes into the greatest dancer in the world. Fedor falls in love with a ballerina, Nana Carlova, but Tsarakov fears that she will ruin Fedor as a dancer. He tries to separate them and ultimately fires Nana from the ballet troupe. Fedor runs away with Nana to Paris, but Tsarakov has blacklisted him: He cannot get ballet jobs and is reduced to working in a cabaret. Nana begs Tsarakov to bring Fedor back. Tsarakov will, if Nana leaves Fedor and marries another man. She agrees. Fedor returns, embittered, but when he sees Nana on opening night and realizes that she still loves him, he refuses to dance. Tsarakov threatens to kill him, but the ballet master, under the influence of drugs that Tsarakov has been giving him, kills Tsarakov. Fedor and Nana are reunited.

== Cast ==
- John Barrymore as Vladimar Ivan Tsarakov
- Marian Marsh as Nana Carlova
- Charles Butterworth as Karimsky
- Donald Cook as Fedor Ivanoff
- Luis Alberni as Sergei Bankieff
- Carmel Myers as Sonya Preskoya
- Andre Luguet as Count Robert Renaud
- Frankie Darro as Young Fedor

== Reception ==
Warner Bros. was so pleased by the box office returns for Svengali (1931), also starring Barrymore and Marsh, that they rushed The Mad Genius into production and released it on November 7, 1931.

According to Warner Bros., the film earned $278,000 domestically and $122,000 foreign.

In his October 24, 1931, review for The New York Times, Mordaunt Hall calls Barrymore's performance “admirable”, but finds the supporting cast wanting and/or miscast. “Although the story… is interesting while Mr. Barrymore occupies the screen, it becomes numb once he disappears…. the only other player who succeeds in his part is Luis Alberni, who figures as Serge (the drug-addicted ballet master). Mr. Barrymore, however, gives an excellent interpretation of Tsarakov …. Never for a moment is Mr. Barrymore off key, and it is somewhat distressing when such a brilliant actor is playing in the same scene with Miss Marsh. The staging of the production is brilliant…. Michael Curtiz, the director, deserves a great deal of credit for his share of the work and it is a pity that he did not have the power to order some of the dialogue changed and also have something to say concerning the selection of players.”

TCM reports: “Variety praised Barrymore's performance as "a brilliant piece of acting, but the story lacks the quality that makes for wide human appeal... It is the actor's acting that takes the center of the screen, and not the human identity he plays, and that has been true of many of Barrymore's recent creations." “

== Preservation ==
The film survives complete. It is preserved in the Library of Congress collection.
