= The Second Floor Mystery =

1930 film

- Theatrical release poster
- Directed by: Roy Del Ruth
- Written by: Joseph Jackson
- Based on: The Agony Column (1916 novel) by Earl Derr Biggers
- Starring: Grant Withers; Loretta Young; H. B. Warner; John Loder.
- Cinematography: Barney McGill
- Edited by: William Holmes
- Music by: Samuel Kaylin; R.H. Bassett
- Production company: Warner Bros. Pictures
- Distributed by: Warner Bros. Pictures
- Release date: April 26, 1930 (US)
- Running time: 58 minutes
- Country: United States
- Language: English

The Second Floor Mystery is a 1930 American pre-Code film directed by Roy Del Ruth. It was based on the 1916 novel The Agony Column by Earl Derr Biggers. The film stars Grant Withers, Loretta Young, H. B. Warner and John Loder.

== Plot ==
Geoffrey West and Marion Ferguson, two American tourists in London, meet each other at a London hotel while eating breakfast. Both are reading the personal columns of The Times. The next day West inserts an ad, under the alias of Lord Strawberries, which requests her friendship. Ferguson, using the alias of Lady Grapefruit, places an ad in reply which suggests that he should write a series of five letters proving himself worth knowing.

West makes up a fabulous story about a murder mystery based on the things he has heard his upstairs neighbors arguing about. Ferguson's aunt, who disapproves of West, suspects West is the murderer and contacts Scotland Yard. West's neighbor (the one he mentioned in his letters) is found dead and the police immediately suspect West and Ferguson as being involved in the murder. The real murderer, when he hears they are prime suspects, then attempts to frame them.

== Cast ==
- Grant Withers as Geoffrey West
- Loretta Young as Marion Ferguson
- H.B. Warner as Inspector Bray
- Claire McDowell as Aunt Hattie
- Sidney Bracey as Alfred
- Crauford Kent as Capt. Fraser-Freer
- John Loder as Fraser-Freer's Younger Brother
- Claude King as Enright
- Judith Vosselli as the Vamp

== Preservation status ==
The film survives complete. A mute print was transferred onto 16mm film by Associated Artists Productions in the 1950s. The Vitaphone soundtrack was lost until 2004 and restored to the film by the UCLA Film and Television Archive. A 16mm copy is housed at the Wisconsin Center for Film and Theater Research. Also listed as being incomplete at the Library of Congress.
