= The Sport Parade =

1932 film

- Directed by: Dudley Murphy
- Screenplay by: Corey Ford; Francis Cockrell
- Story by: Jerry Horwin
- Produced by: David O. Selznick
- Starring: Joel McCrea; Marian Marsh; William Gargan; Robert Benchley; Richard "Skeets" Gallagher; Walter Catlett
- Cinematography: J. Roy Hunt
- Edited by: Jack Kitchin
- Music by: Max Steiner
- Distributed by: RKO Radio Pictures
- Release date: November 11, 1932 (U.S.)
- Running time: 64 minutes
- Country: United States
- Language: English
- Budget: $100,000

The Sport Parade is a 1932 American pre-Code sports drama film directed by Dudley Murphy and starring Joel McCrea, Marian Marsh, William Gargan, Robert Benchley, and Richard "Skeets" Gallagher. It was released by RKO Radio Pictures. Benchley also co-wrote the screenplay. The film includes location shots of New York City in 1932.

== Plot ==
The characters played by McCrea and Gargan are friends from Dartmouth College, who play together on the college football team, and whose lives take different paths. Later, they move to New York, argue over a woman Irene (Marsh), and get involved with pro wrestling, which turns out to be run by local racketeers.

== Cast ==
- Joel McCrea as Sandy Brown
- William Gargan as Johnny Baker
- Marian Marsh as Irene Stewart
- Robert Benchley as the Radio Announcer
- Walter Catlett as "Shifty" Morrison
- Richard "Skeets" Gallagher as Dizzy
- Clarence Wilson as the Toastmaster
- Ivan Linow as Muller
- George Chandler as Pullman Ticket Agent
- June Brewster as Girl at Nightclub

== Pre-Code scenes ==
The film has become famous for certain Pre-Code scenes, including Gargan snapping a wet towel at McCrea in a scene where football players can be seen taking a shower in the background.

== See also ==
- List of American football films
