= Jean Fenwick =

American actress

- Born: Sigfreda Harriet Krauth; May 30, 1907; Trinidad
- Died: December 5, 1998 (aged 91); Woodland Hills, Los Angeles, California, U.S.
- Other names: Jean Morgan
- Occupation: Actress
- Years active: 1926–1960
- Relatives: Marian Marsh (sister)

Jean Fenwick (born Sigfreda Harriet Krauth; May 30, 1907 — December 5, 1998) was an American actress born in Trinidad.

== Early life ==
Fenwick was born in Trinidad in 1907, the older sister of Violet Ethelred Krauth (who became actress Marian Marsh) and Anthony Edward Krauth (who also acted, under the name "Tony Marsh"). Their parents, Leo Krauth and Harriet Morgan Krauth, ran a chocolate factory. During World War I the Krauths moved to Boston, Massachusetts. In 1925, Harriet was one of the first 18 students chosen to open the Paramount Pictures School in New York City, along with Thelma Todd. The family moved again, to Los Angeles, California, when Harriet was a teenager starting in films.

== Career ==
In 1926, Fenwick was signed as a contract player at FBO Studios, where she first used the screen name Jean Morgan before settling on Jean Fenwick.

Films in which Fenwick appeared included Cross Country Cruise (1933, with Lew Ayres), Mary of Scotland (1936, directed by John Ford and starring Katharine Hepburn), Conquest (1937, with Greta Garbo), Arrest Bulldog Drummond (1939), Divorce (1945), and Street Corner (1948). Later in her career, she appeared in television productions, including episodes of Gunsmoke (1957), and One Step Beyond (1960)

== Personal life ==
Fenwick died in Woodland Hills, California in 1998, aged 91 years.
