= In Spite of Danger =

1935 film

- Directed by: Lambert Hillyer
- Screenplay by: Anthony Coldeway
- Starring: Wallace Ford; Marian Marsh; Arthur Hohl; Charley Grapewin; Charles Middleton; Edward LeSaint
- Cinematography: Benjamin H. Kline
- Edited by: Otto Meyer
- Production company: Columbia Pictures
- Distributed by: Columbia Pictures
- Release date: March 8, 1935
- Running time: 53 minutes
- Country: United States
- Language: English

In Spite of Danger is a 1935 American action film directed by Lambert Hillyer and written by Anthony Coldeway. The film stars Wallace Ford, Marian Marsh, Arthur Hohl, Charley Grapewin, Charles Middleton and Edward LeSaint. The film was released on March 8, 1935, by Columbia Pictures.

== Cast ==
- Wallace Ford as Bob Crane
- Marian Marsh as Sally Sullivan
- Arthur Hohl as Steve Lynch
- Charley Grapewin as Pop Sullivan
- Charles Middleton as Mr. Merritt
- Edward LeSaint as Dr. Daley
- Dick Wessel as Monk Grady
- Jay Ward as Tommy Sullivan
