= Thomas H. Miller =

U.S. Marine Corps Lieutenant General

Thomas Hulbert Miller
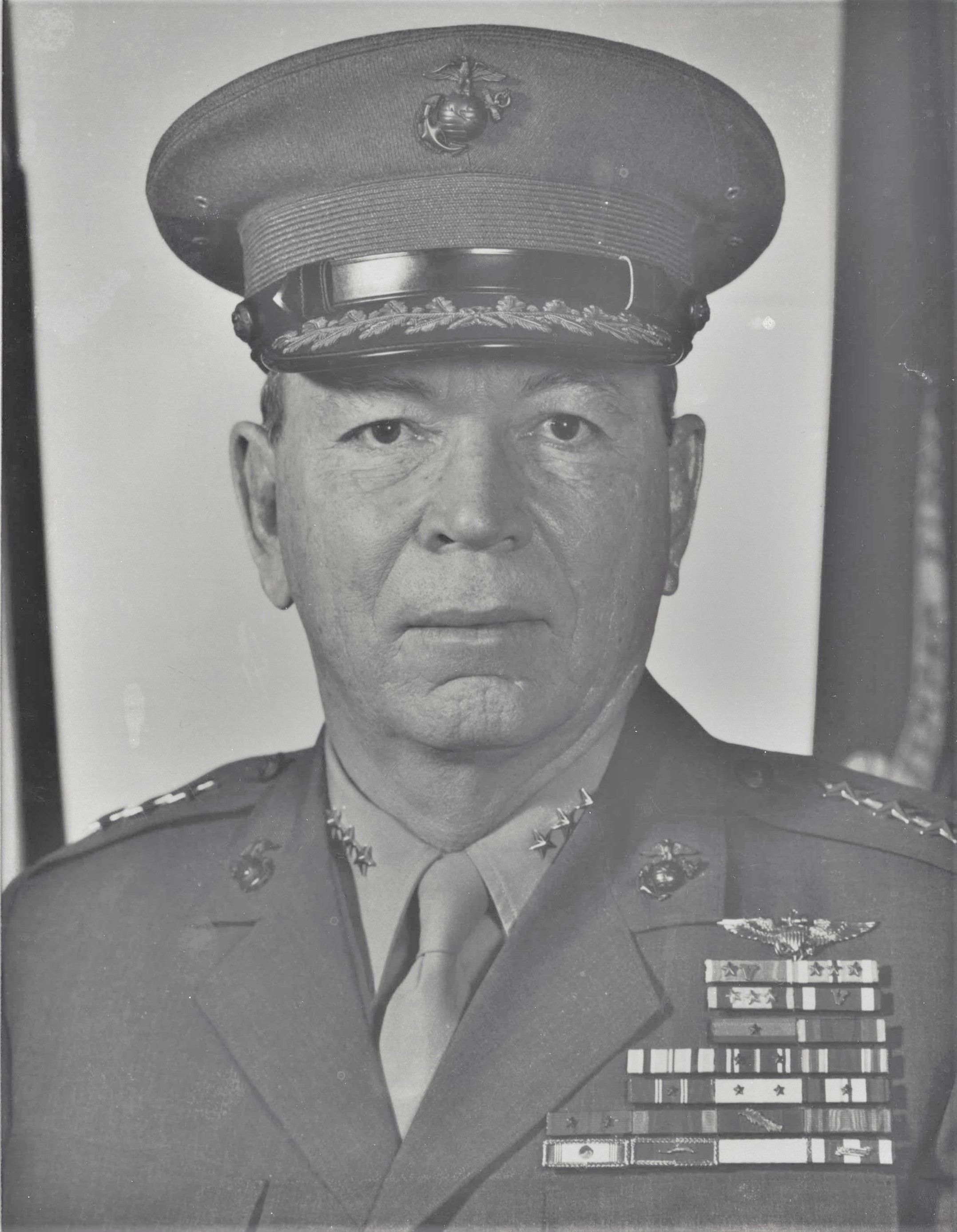
- LtGen Thomas H. Miller
- Born: June 3, 1923; San Antonio, Texas, U.S.
- Died: November 27, 2007 (aged 84); Arlington, Virginia, U.S.
- Burial place: Arlington National Cemetery
- Military career
- Allegiance: United States of America
- Branch: United States Marine Corps
- Service years: 1942–1979
- Rank: Lieutenant General
- Commands: 2nd Marine Aircraft Wing; Deputy Chief of Staff (Air), Headquarters Marine Corps
- Conflicts: World War II; Korean War; Vietnam War
- Awards: Navy Distinguished Service Medal; Legion of Merit; Distinguished Flying Cross; Air Medal

Lieutenant General Thomas H. Miller (June 3, 1923 – November 27, 2007), was a United States Marine Corps Naval Aviator and test pilot. Miller saw active combat in World War II, Korea, and Vietnam. As a test pilot, he set a World Speed Record in an F4H-1 (F4B) Phantom. He was the first American to fly the Marine Corps' new AV-8A Harrier jet, capable of vertical takeoff and landing, orchestrating its procurement for the Marine Corps and oversee development of the concept during his career. For this effort, Miller was known as "the father of STOVL (short take-off and vertical landing) aviation in the USMC."

== Education ==
Lieutenant General Miller was born June 3, 1923, in San Antonio, Texas. He attended Schreiner Institute, Kerrville, Texas, and played college football at the University of Texas. General Miller attended the Naval War College, Newport, RI, and studied at the University of Maryland. He was also a graduate of the Amphibious Warfare School, Senior Course, Quantico, Virginia.

== Military service ==
Miller enlisted in the U.S. Naval Reserve in June 1942 shortly after the outbreak of World War II, was designated as an Aviation Cadet and underwent flight training at the Naval Air Station Dallas and NAS Corpus Christi, Texas. When Student Naval Aviators earned their wings they also received a commission in the U.S. Navy, or the Marine Corps, if they so chose. When Miller was nearing completion of flight school, he heard a talk from several WWII Marine combat aviators. He was impressed enough by these men and their accounts of combat that he, along with classmate John Glenn opted for the Marine Corps, reasoning that the Marine Corps offered a better chance to fly fighters than did the Navy. Miller was commissioned a Marine Second Lieutenant and designated a Naval Aviator on March 1, 1943.

=== WWII ===
Miller trained at MCAS Cherry Point North Carolina prior to reporting to MCAS El Centro California, in June 1943, for duty as a pilot with Marine Observation Squadron 155, later designated as Marine Fighter Squadron 155. He deployed to the Pacific the following February, participating in combat operations on Midway Island and the Gilbert and Marshall Islands.

=== Test pilot ===
After WWII, he graduated from the first Test Pilot School, and served as a test pilot and projects officer at the Naval Test Center Naval Air Station Patuxent River, Maryland from 1945 to 1946. He went on to be one of the first naval aviators to fly the YP-59 jet fighter and many of the earliest helicopters.

In between service in Korea and Vietnam, Miller was assigned as officer-in-charge of the Marine team participating in the Fleet Introduction Program (FIP) for the evaluation and introduction of the new A-4 Skyhawk attack aircraft into Navy and Marine Corps Squadrons. In 1960, he served at the Bureau of Aeronautics, later the Bureau of Naval Weapons, Washington, D.C., as a research and development project officer of the F4H-1 (later the F-4B) Weapons System, during which time he set the 500-kilometer Closed Course World Speed Record at 1,216.78 miles per hour at Edwards Air Force Base, California, on September 5, 1960. In 1965, General Miller was assigned to head the U.S. Marine Corps Air Weapons Systems Requirements section. His development of the military helicopter during this time helped generate a new level of helicopter capability for civilian use in a broad range of applications, ranging from police and Medivac work to corporate executive transportation. He was the first American to fly the Marine Corps' new AV-8A jet, capable of vertical takeoff and landing, and in April 1968, he was the first to fly the Phantom jet coast to coast without refueling.

=== Korean War ===
Miller participated in combat operations in Korea with Marine Attack Squadron 323, serving as both the operations officer and executive officer. In May 1953, he served in the Joint Operations Center in Seoul, Korea, as Marine intelligence and air targets officer. It was during the Korean War that he saw the potential of then-embryonic helicopters for the search and rescue of downed airmen.

=== Vietnam War ===
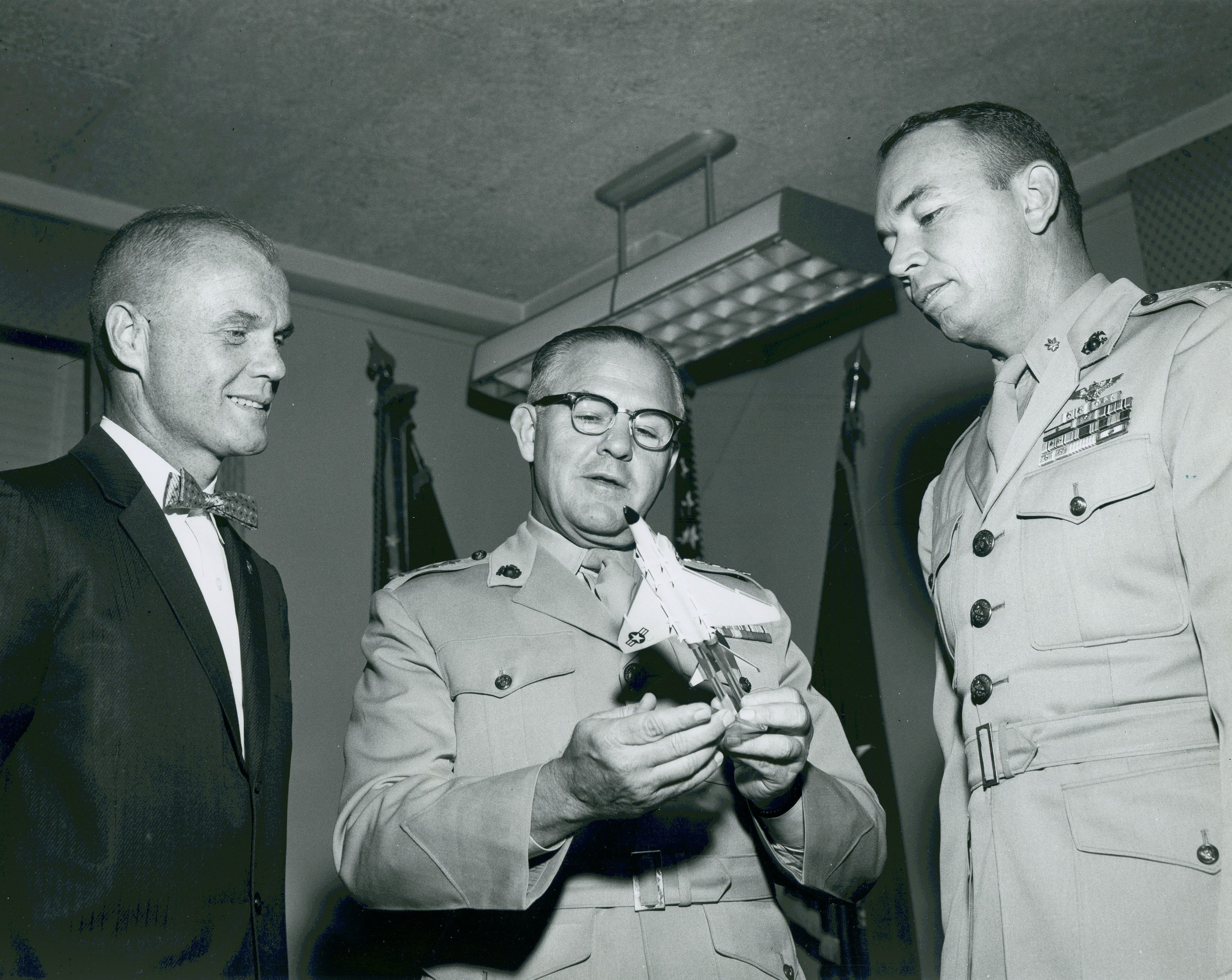
Miller (right) with Commandant David M. Shoup (center) and John H. Glenn Jr., September 1960.

Miller served as executive officer, Marine Attack Squadron 224 and, as commanding officer of Marine Fighter/Attack Squadron 513, deployed to the South Vietnam in May 1965. He was promoted to brigadier general in August 1969, and was ordered to South Vietnam in December 1969, where he served as assistant chief of staff, and later as the chief of staff, III Marine Amphibious Force.

=== Staff assignments ===
In January 1971, Miller was assigned as assistant wing commander, and then commander, 2nd Marine Aircraft Wing, MCAS Cherry Point. During General Officer confirmation consideration on the Senator floor in 1975, Senator John Glenn praised Miller with the following words: "I know of no man to whom I would give higher recommendation for any position than Tom Miller. He is dedicated to doing what is right, is a fine Christian gentleman in every sense and I deem our country fortunate to have a man of this caliber." In April 1975, he assumed command as General, Fleet Marine Force Pacific. In August 1975, he was deputy chief of staff for aviation at Headquarters Marine Corps where he led the successful effort to develop and procure the improved AV-8B Harrier and to obtain funds to launch the unique tilt rotor V-STOL V-22 Osprey Transport.

== Retirement ==
He retired from active duty on July 1, 1979, as a lieutenant general. After retirement, Miller served on the Department of Defense Science Board, the National Academy of Sciences, the Federal Aviation Administration, the National Museum of Naval Aviation, the Astronaut Scholarship Foundation, Washington Airports Task Force, and the Air and Space Heritage Council for the expansion of the Smithsonian Air and Space Museum. He died of cancer at his home in Arlington, Virginia, on November 27, 2007, and was interred at Arlington National Cemetery.

=== Awards and honors ===
Miller's personal decorations and awards included the Navy Distinguished Service Medal, the Legion of Merit, the Distinguished Flying Cross, and the Air Medal.

- Miller was the recipient of 1979 Silver Hawk Award to honor the active duty Marine Aviator or Marine Naval Flight Officer holding the earliest designation date.
- On November 13, 2000, Senator John Glenn, a close friend of Miller's, presented him with the Williams Trophy for his "leadership in the evolution of vertical flight," and "lifelong dedication to aviation safety and improvement." The Williams Trophy, established in 1996 is awarded annually to honor those "whose leadership, vision and dedication in the application of aviation or space has enriched the quality of life on earth."
- Yuma's chapter of the Marine Corps Aviation Association is named in honor of Miller.
- In 2004, Miller was named the honorary chairman of the 33rd annual Marine Corps Aviation Association symposium and convention.
- LGen Miller was selected to the Naval Aviation Hall of Honor in 2010.
- Miller was the recipient of National Aeronautic Association's Cliff Henderson Award for Achievement

Military offices
| Preceded by Victor A. Armstrong | Director of Aviation; August 22, 1975 – June 29, 1979 | Succeeded by William J. White |
