= House of Errors =

1942 film directed by Bernard B. Ray

- Theatrical release poster
- Directed by: Bernard B. Ray
- Screenplay by: Ewart Adamson; Eddie Davis
- Story by: Harry Langdon
- Produced by: Bernard B. Ray
- Starring: Harry Langdon; Charley Rogers; Marian Marsh; Ray Walker; Betty Blythe; John Holland
- Cinematography: Robert E. Cline
- Edited by: Dan Milner
- Production company: Producers Releasing Corporation
- Distributed by: Producers Releasing Corporation
- Release date: April 10, 1942
- Running time: 65 minutes
- Country: United States
- Language: English

House of Errors is a 1942 American comedy film directed by Bernard B. Ray and written by Ewart Adamson and Eddie Davis. The film stars Harry Langdon, Charley Rogers, Marian Marsh in her final film, Ray Walker, Betty Blythe and John Holland. The film was released on April 10, 1942, by Producers Releasing Corporation.

== Cast ==
- Harry Langdon as Bert
- Charley Rogers as Alf
- Marian Marsh as Florence Randall
- Ray Walker as Jerry Fitzgerald
- Betty Blythe as Mrs. Martha Randall
- John Holland as Paul Gordon
- Guy Kingsford as Drake
- Roy Butler as Mr. Carr
- Gwen Gaze as Molly
- Monte Collins as Prof. Stark
- Vernon Dent as White
- Robert Barron as Samson
- Lynn Starr as Waitress
- Richard Kipling as Hiram Randall
- Frank Hagney as Black
