= Guard That Girl =

1935 film directed by Lambert Hillyer

- French version of the theatrical poster for the film
- Directed by: Lambert Hillyer
- Written by: Lambert Hillyer
- Produced by: Harry Decker
- Starring: Robert Allen; Florence Rice; Ward Bond
- Cinematography: Benjamin Kline
- Edited by: Al Clark
- Production company: Columbia Pictures
- Release date: September 20, 1935 (US)
- Running time: 67 minutes
- Country: United States
- Language: English

Guard That Girl is a 1935 American mystery film written and directed by Lambert Hillyer, which stars Robert Allen, Florence Rice, and Ward Bond.

== Cast ==
- Robert Allen as Larry Donovan
- Florence Rice as Helen Bradford
- Ward Bond as Budge Edwards
- Wyrley Birch as Mr. Scranton
- Barbara Kent as Jeanne Martin
- Arthur Hohl as Reynolds
- Elizabeth Risdon as Aunt Catherine
- Nana Bryant as Sarah
- Thurston Hall as Dr. Silas Hudson
- Bert Roach as Ellwood
- Lobo the dog as Benjy's police dog
