= Arthur Hohl =

American actor (1889–1964)

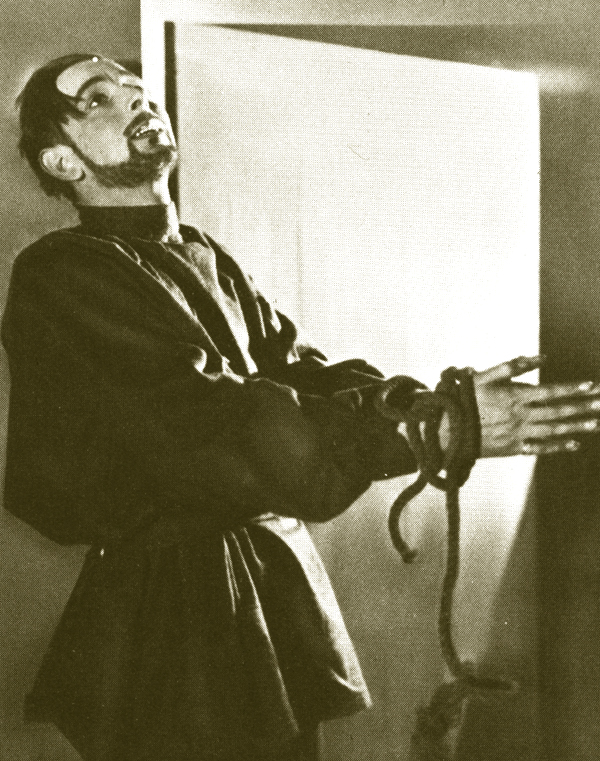
- Born: May 21, 1889; Pittsburgh, Pennsylvania, U.S.
- Died: March 10, 1964 (aged 74); Los Angeles, California, U.S.
- Occupation: Actor
- Years active: 1924–1949
- Height: 6 ft 2 in (188 cm)
- Spouse: Jessie E. Gray (m. 1920)

Arthur Hohl (May 21, 1889 – March 10, 1964) was an American stage and motion-picture character actor.

== Formative years and family ==
Born in Pittsburgh, Pennsylvania on May 21, 1889, Hohl began appearing in films during the early 1920s. He played a great number of villainous or mildly larcenous roles, although his screen roles usually were small, but he also played a few sympathetic characters.

In 1920, Hohl married Jessie E. Gray, who survived him when he died in 1964. The couple had no children.

== Career ==
Hohl's two performances seen most often today are as Pete, the nasty boat engineer who tells the local sheriff about Julie (Helen Morgan) and her husband (Donald Cook)'s secret interracial marriage in Show Boat (1936), and as Mr. Montgomery, the man who helps Richard Arlen and Leila Hyams make their final escape in Island of Lost Souls (1932). He also played Brutus opposite Warren William's Julius Caesar in Cecil B. DeMille's version of Cleopatra (1934), starring Claudette Colbert.

Among his other notable roles were as Olivier, King Louis XI's right-hand man, in The Hunchback of Notre Dame (1939), as the real estate agent in Charlie Chaplin's Monsieur Verdoux (1947), and as Journet, a bereaved innkeeper who seeks to avenge his daughter's murder in the Basil Rathbone Sherlock Holmes film The Scarlet Claw (1944). Hohl also played a Christian named Titus in Cecil B. DeMille's religious epic The Sign of the Cross (1932).

Many sources claim that Hohl played a monk in the 1943 film classic The Song of Bernadette, but he is nowhere to be seen in the finished film.

Hohl also appeared on the Broadway stage in plays by William Shakespeare, George Bernard Shaw, and Henrik Ibsen. Some of his stage roles, such as Sir Andrew Aguecheek in a 1930 Broadway revival of Twelfth Night, were considerably larger than his film roles.

== Filmography ==
- Wolfe and Montcalm (1924) as Gen. James Wolfe
- The Puritans (1924)
- It Is the Law (1924) as Albert Woodruff / Sniffer
- The Cheat (1931) as Defense Attorney (uncredited)
- The Night of June 13 (1932) as Prosecuting Attorney
- The Sign of the Cross (1932) as Titus
- Island of Lost Souls (1932) as Montgomery
- The Crime of the Century (1933) as Announcer (uncredited)
- Infernal Machine (1933) as Ship's Captain
- The Life of Jimmy Dolan (1933) as Herman Malvin
- The Silk Express (1933) as Wallace Myton
- Private Detective 62 (1933) as Hogan
- The Narrow Corner (1933) as Captain Nichols
- Baby Face (1933) as Ed Sipple
- Captured! (1933) as Cocky
- Brief Moment (1933) as Steve Walsh
- Wild Boys of the Road (1933) as Dr. Heckel
- Footlight Parade (1933) as Frazer
- The Kennel Murder Case (1933) as Gamble - the Butler
- Man's Castle (1933) as Bragg
- College Coach (1933) as Seymour Young
- The World Changes (1933) as Mr. Patten
- Massacre (1934) as Dr. Turner
- As the Earth Turns (1934) as George
- Jimmy the Gent (1934) as Joe
- A Modern Hero (1934) as Homer Flint
- The Defense Rests (1934) as James Randolph
- Bulldog Drummond Strikes Back (1934) as Dr. Sothern
- Girl in Danger (1934) as Albert Beckett
- Among the Missing (1934) as Gordon
- Cleopatra (1934) as Brutus
- Lady by Choice (1934) as Kendall
- Against the Law (1934) as Kelly
- Jealousy (1934) as Mike Callahan
- Romance in Manhattan (1935) as Halsey J. Pander
- The Whole Town's Talking (1935) as Detective Sergeant Boyle
- In Spite of Danger (1935) as Steve Lynch
- I'll Love You Always (1935) as Jergens
- Eight Bells (1935) as Williams
- One Frightened Night (1935) as Arthur Proctor
- Village Tale (1935) as Elmer Stevenson
- Unknown Woman (1935) as Lansing
- After the Dance (1935) as Louie
- Atlantic Adventure (1935) as Frank Julian
- Case of the Missing Man (1935) as Steve
- Guard That Girl (1935) as Reynolds
- Super Speed (1935) as Philip Morton
- We're Only Human (1935) as Conroy (uncredited)
- If You Could Only Cook (1935) as Lawyer John Martin
- The Lone Wolf Returns (1935) as Undetermined Supporting Role (scenes deleted)
- It Had to Happen (1936) as Honest John Pelkey
- Show Boat (1936) as Pete
- Forgotten Faces (1936) as Hi-Jack Eddie
- The Devil-Doll (1936) as Victor Radin
- Lloyd's of London (1936) as First Captain
- The Road Back (1937) as Heinrich
- Slave Ship (1937) as Grimes
- Mountain Music (1937) as Prosecuting Attorney (uncredited)
- Trapped by G-Men (1937) as Henchman Blackie
- Hot Water (1937) as Walter Whittaker
- The Bad Man of Brimstone (1937) as 'Doc' Laramie
- Penitentiary (1938) as Finch (uncredited)
- Kidnapped (1938) as Riach
- Crime Takes a Holiday (1938) as Joe Whitehead
- Stablemates (1938) as Mr. Gale
- Boy Slaves (1939) as Sheriff
- You Can't Cheat an Honest Man (1939) as Burr
- Help Wanted (1939) as Graham - Head of Employment Agency (uncredited)
- They Shall Have Music (1939) as Miller
- Fugitive at Large (1939) as Curtis
- The Adventures of Sherlock Holmes (1939) as Bassick
- Blackmail (1939) as Rawlins
- Two Thoroughbreds (1939) as Thaddeus Carey
- The Hunchback of Notre Dame (1939) as Olivier
- 20 Mule Team (1940) as Salters
- Blondie Has Servant Trouble (1940) as Eric Vaughn
- Men of Boys Town (1941) as Guard
- Ride on Vaquero (1941) as Sheriff Johnny Burns
- We Go Fast (1941) as Hold-Up Man
- Son of Fury: The Story of Benjamin Blake (1942) as Captain Greenough
- Moontide (1942) as Jennings
- Whispering Ghosts (1942) as Inspector Norris
- City Without Men (1943) as Convict (uncredited)
- Idaho (1943) as Spike Madagan
- The Woman of the Town (1943) as Robert Wright
- The Spider Woman (1944) as Adam Gilflower
- The Scarlet Claw (1944) as Emile Journet
- The Eve of St. Mark (1944) as Sheep-Wagon Driver (uncredited)
- Shadows in the Night (1944) as Riggs (uncredited)
- Irish Eyes Are Smiling (1944) as Barker (uncredited)
- Mystery of the River Boat (1944) as Clayton
- Salome, Where She Danced (1945) as Bartender
- The Thin Man Goes Home (1945)
- The Frozen Ghost (1945) as Skeptic
- Love Letters (1945) as Jupp (uncredited)
- Our Vines Have Tender Grapes (1945) sa Dvar Svenson (uncredited)
- The Yearling (1946) as Arch Forrester (uncredited)
- Monsieur Verdoux (1947) as Real Estate Agent
- It Happened on 5th Avenue (1947) as Brady - Gates Patrolman (uncredited)
- The Vigilantes Return (1947) as Sheriff
- The Three Musketeers (1948) as Dragon Rouge Host (uncredited)
- You Gotta Stay Happy (1948) as Cemetery Man
- Down to the Sea in Ships (1949) as Blair (uncredited) (final film role)
