= The Man Who Lived Twice =

1936 film by Harry Lachman

- Directed by: Harry Lachman
- Written by: Henry Altimus; Fred Niblo Jr.; Arthur Strawn; Tom Van Dycke
- Produced by: Ben Pivar; Irving Briskin
- Starring: Ralph Bellamy; Marian Marsh; Thurston Hall
- Cinematography: James Van Trees
- Edited by: Byron Robinson
- Production company: Columbia Pictures
- Distributed by: Columbia Pictures
- Release date: September 25, 1936
- Running time: 73 minutes
- Country: United States
- Language: English

The Man Who Lived Twice is a 1936 American crime film directed by Harry Lachman and starring Ralph Bellamy, Marian Marsh and Thurston Hall. It was remade as Man in the Dark in 1953.

== Plot summary ==
“Slick” Rawley is a professional criminal and murderer with a scarred and disfigured face; he has a good friend, ex-boxer “Gloves” Baker, and a tough girlfriend, Peggy Russell. While evading the police, he ducks into a college lecture hall and catches a lecture by respected scientist Dr. Clifford Schuyler. This doctor says he thinks he can cure some violent criminals by a brain operation to relieve pressure from tumors; he has operated on vicious dogs successfully, but never a human. Slick offers himself as a human test subject, with plastic surgery for his disfigurement thrown in.

Dr. Schuyler's operation has the unexpected effect of causing Slick to permanently lose all memory of his identity, friends and criminal life. With the pressure on his brain relieved, he is attracted toward the good and helpful life of a doctor, and Dr. Schuyler mentors him as he trains and becomes Dr. James Blake. Dr. Blake is somehow drawn to helping prisoners as part of his practice, and he helps and falls in love with a nice woman named Janet Haydon. He becomes well known for research and publication in Dr. Schuyler's field.

Years after his surgery and amnesia, Gloves Baker turns up as one of the prisoners he is helping, and becomes his chauffeur. Gloves gradually realizes, partly by a surviving habit of twirling his keychain, that Dr. Blake started out as Slick Rawley. Dr. Schuyler, knowing his loyalty, tells him the truth when he asks, and Gloves swears never to tell anyone, especially Dr. Blake himself. But Peggy Russell also turns up and recognizes Blake as Slick. She tries to blackmail him, demanding $5000 to leave town and not tell on him, but Dr. Blake has no idea what she is talking about and throws her out. She then goes to the police and turns him in to the inspector who has been looking for him all these years, for a $10,000 reward.

Dr. Schuyler sadly tells Dr. Blake who he was before his amnesia; Dr. Blake's reaction is that he should pay for Slick's crimes, and when the inspector shows up to arrest him, he surrenders without protest. A judge who knows and respects him steps down from the bench to be his lawyer. Peggy maliciously looks forward to testifying against Blake; when Gloves cannot talk her out of it during a car ride, he runs the car off the road and kills both of them, depriving the state of its most vivid witnesses.

This sacrifice is in vain, because despite the judge's argument that Slick died ten years ago and Blake is innocent, the jury convicts. But the public, medical and legal associations demand Blake's pardon, and the governor grants it. The story ends with Janet, to whom Blake is to be married the next day, playfully administering a lie detector test to him about his feelings for her.

== Cast ==
- Ralph Bellamy as Dr. James Blake / 'Slick' Rawley
- Marian Marsh as Janet Haydon
- Thurston Hall as Dr. Clifford L. Schuyler
- Isabel Jewell as Peggy Russell
- Nana Bryant as Margaret Schuyler
- Ward Bond as John 'Gloves' Baker
- Henry Kolker as Judge Henry Treacher
- Willard Robertson as Police Insp. Logan
- Ann Doran as Nurse Cameron
- Kathrin Clare Ward as Aggie
- Beatrice Curtis as Prisoner
- Mary Lou Dix as Prisoner
- Franklyn Farnum as Juror
- Betty Farrington as Head Matron
- Jascha Heifetz as himself - Violinist (archive footage)
- Edward Keane as Police Commissioner
- Edward LeSaint as Judge
- Eric Mayne as man in Montage
- Bruce Mitchell as Cleary
- Bert Moorhouse as Carney
- G. Raymond Nye as Stoney - Fingerprint Man
- Frank O'Connor as Frank - Policeman
- Cyril Ring as Heifetz Concert Attendee
- Nell Roy as Prisoner

== Bibliography ==
- Cardullo, Bert. European Directors and Their Films: Essays on Cinema. Scarecrow Press, 2012.
