= Barney McGill =

American cinematographer

- Born: April 30, 1890; Salt Lake City, Utah
- Died: January 11, 1942 (aged 51); Los Angeles, California, U.S.
- Other names: Chick McGill
- Occupation: Cinematographer
- Years active: 1919-1941
- Spouse: Violet Lewis (1918-?)
- Children: 1

Barney McGill (April 30, 1890 – January 11, 1942) was an American cinematographer who was nominated at the 4th Academy Awards for Best Cinematography for the film Svengali. He was born in Salt Lake City, Utah in 1890. He was the cinematographer for more than 90 films from 1919 to 1941.

== Partial filmography ==
- My Lady Friends (1921)
- Marry the Poor Girl (1921)
- The Man from Glengarry (1922)
- Glengarry School Days (1923)
- A Self-Made Failure (1924) (with Ray June)
- A Trip to Chinatown (1926)
- What Price Glory? (1926)
- Casey at the Bat (1927)
- The Rejuvenation of Aunt Mary (1927)
- Jaws of Steel (1927)
- Across the Atlantic (1928)
- The Crimson City (1928)
- The House of Scandal (1928)
- State Street Sadie (1928)
- The Terror (1928) (as Chick McGill)
- Noah's Ark (1928) (with Hal Mohr)
- The Home Towners (1928)
- The Desert Song (1929)
- The Hottentot (1929)
- Gold Diggers of Broadway (1929)
- The Show of Shows (1929)
- The Aviator (1929) (as Chick McGill)
- Mammy (1930)
- The Second Floor Mystery (1930)
- Three Faces East (1930)
- A Soldier's Plaything (1930)
- Other Men's Women (1931)
- Svengali (1931) (nominated for an Academy Award)
- Night Nurse (1931)
- The Mad Genius (1931)
- Alias the Doctor (1932)
- The Mouthpiece (1932)
- Beauty and the Boss (1932)
- Miss Pinkerton (1932)
- The Cabin in the Cotton (1932)
- 20,000 Years in Sing Sing (1932)
- Employees' Entrance (1933)
- The Keyhole (1933)
- The Bowery (1933)
- Born to be Bad (1934)
- Brewster's Millions (1935)
- Folies Bergère de Paris (1935)
- Charlie Chan in Shanghai (1935)
- Crack Up (1936)
- Nancy Steele Is Missing! (1937)
- The Lone Wolf Keeps a Date (1941)
- So Long Mr. Chumps (1941)
