= Unknown Woman (1935 film) =

- Directed by: Albert S. Rogell
- Written by: Scott Darling; Albert DeMond; Fred Niblo Jr.
- Produced by: Sid Rogell
- Starring: Richard Cromwell; Marian Marsh; Douglass Dumbrille
- Cinematography: Henry Freulich
- Edited by: Gene Havlick
- Production company: Columbia Pictures
- Distributed by: Columbia Pictures
- Release date: June 21, 1935
- Running time: 66 minutes
- Country: United States
- Language: English

Unknown Woman is a 1935 American drama film directed by Albert S. Rogell and starring Richard Cromwell, Marian Marsh and Douglass Dumbrille.

== Cast ==
- Richard Cromwell as Larry Condon
- Marian Marsh as Helen Griffith
- Douglass Dumbrille as Phil Gardner
- Henry Armetta as Joe Scalise
- Arthur Hohl as Lansing
- George McKay as Gus
- Robert Middlemass as Hammacher
- Nana Bryant as Aunt Mary
- Arthur Vinton as Whitney
- Jerry Mandy as Tony
- Ben Taggart as Shanley
- Nellie V. Nichols as Rosa
- Robert Wilber as Mitch
- Eddy Chandler as Hank
- Edward LeSaint as Night Court Judge
- Arthur Rankin as Parker
- Hooper Atchley as Newcomb
- George Guhl as Lt. Wilson

== Bibliography ==
- Dick, Bernard F. Columbia Pictures: Portrait of a Studio. University Press of Kentucky, 2015.
