= Beauty and the Boss =

1932 film

- Directed by: Roy Del Ruth
- Written by: Joseph Jackson
- Based on: A templom egere (A Church Mouse); 1927 play by Ladislas Fodor
- Starring: Marian Marsh; David Manners; Warren William
- Cinematography: Barney McGill
- Edited by: James B. Morley
- Music by: W. Franke Harling
- Production company: Warner Bros. Pictures
- Distributed by: Warner Bros. Pictures
- Release date: April 9, 1932
- Running time: 66 minutes
- Country: United States
- Language: English

Beauty and the Boss is a 1932 American pre-Code romantic comedy film directed by Roy Del Ruth and starring Marian Marsh, David Manners and Warren William. It was based on the 1927 Hungarian play A templom egere by Ladislas Fodor about a secretary who eventually marries her boss. An English language adaptation of the play by Benn Levy, entitled A Church Mouse, opened in London in early May 1931. Another English language adaptation by Frederic and Fanny Hatton, also called A Church Mouse, opened in New York on October 12, 1931.

In 1934, Warner Brothers' British subsidiary remade the story at Teddington Studios as The Church Mouse.

The film's sets were designed by Anton Grot.

== Plot ==
An executive hires a mousy, plain woman as his secretary so she will not distract him from his work, but she becomes determined to win his heart.

== Cast ==
- Marian Marsh as Susie Sachs
- David Manners as Baron Paul von Ullrich
- Warren William as Baron Josef von Ullrich
- Charles Butterworth as Ludwig Pfeffer Jr.
- Frederick Kerr as Count Von Tolheim
- Mary Doran as Olive 'Ollie' Frey
- Robert Greig as Chappel
- Lilian Bond as Girl at Bar
- Yola d'Avril as Girl in Bath Tub
- Harry Holman as Hotel Manager
- Olaf Hytten as Business Associate
- Barbara Leonard as Girl With Dog
- Polly Walters as Ludwig's Girl
- Leo White as Man in Elevator

== Critical reception ==
The New York Times complimented the performance of Marian Marsh but did not consider the film to have successfully adapted the stage play on which it was based, and wrote, "Without the genuinely satisfactory acting and attractive appearance of Marian Marsh … it would be difficult to go into ecstasies over the otherwise somewhat thin screen comedy. It is mildly amusing, this motion picture version of A Church Mouse with a few clever bits … Possibly the original version of the play, in the Hungarian, needed the seasoning of paprika-risqué, but in the American it gives the impression of rather heavy naughtiness.The plot is of the antiquated variety." In addition to Marsh’s performance, it continued, "There is some superior characterization by Charles Butterworth and Mary Doran, the former in particular."

Variety’s review referred to the "Cinderella central theme" and noted the "extra saucy lines and business." It was largely negative, describing the film as "Grade B stuff" and "unconvincing in its basic import."

Film Pictorial gave a positive review and stated that it was a "charming story … (with) palatial settings, polished atmosphere and excellent acting." It concluded with, "The fun is fast and furious. There are many laughs in this film, despite the age of its plot."

David Nusair writing for Reel Film Reviews commented that Del Ruth "delivers a meandering and mostly uninvolving endeavor that’s made all-the-more underwhelming by its shapeless narrative." He stated, "Marsh’s admittedly compelling turn … an ongoing highlight within the otherwise unremarkable proceedings" and ultimately concluded that the film was a "misfire that generally squanders the agreeable efforts of its various performers."

== Bibliography ==
- Dick, Bernard F. The Merchant Prince of Poverty Row: Harry Cohn of Columbia Pictures. University Press of Kentucky.
