= Alias the Doctor =

1932 film

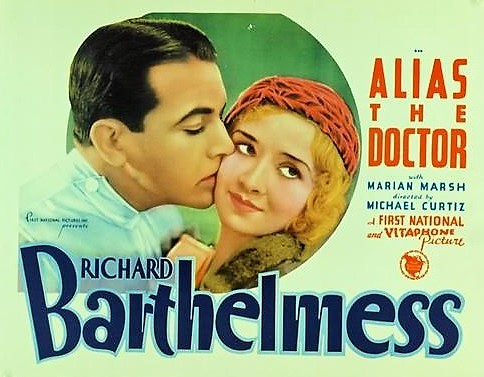
- Lobby card
- Directed by: Michael Curtiz
- Written by: Houston Branch (screenplay); Charles Kenyon (dialogue)
- Based on: A Kuruzslo; 1927 play by Imre Földes
- Starring: Richard Barthelmess; Marian Marsh; Norman Foster; Adrienne Dore; Lucille La Verne; Oscar Apfel; John St. Polis; George Rosener
- Cinematography: Barney McGill
- Edited by: Frank Magee (as Frank McGee); William Holmes
- Music by: Bernhard Kaun; Sam Perry
- Production company: First National Pictures
- Distributed by: First National Pictures
- Release date: 1932
- Running time: 61 mins/69 mins (UK)
- Country: United States
- Language: English
- Budget: $371,000
- Box office: $641,000

Alias the Doctor is a 1932 pre-Code American drama film directed by Michael Curtiz, and starring Richard Barthelmess and Marian Marsh.

== Plot ==
The story concerns a man who assumes his dead brother's identity, and becomes a renowned surgeon, despite not having completed medical school.

== Cast ==
- Richard Barthelmess as Karl Brenner
- Marian Marsh as Lotti Brenner
- Norman Foster as Stephan Brenner
- Adrienne Dore as Anna
- Lucille La Verne as Martha Brenner, Karl's foster mother (as Lucille LaVerne)
- Oscar Apfel as Keller
- John St. Polis as Dr. Niergardt
- George Rosener as Dr. Franz von Bergman
- Boris Karloff as a surgeon (scene edited from film by the censors)

== Background ==
The film's original script involved a playboy medical student who performs an unspecified operation on his girlfriend, before earning his medical degree. The girl dies from the botched operation, and his foster brother takes the blame. The Hays Office objected because it believed that audiences would assume that the operation was an abortion. In response, Warner Bros. Pictures changed the script to provide a specific cause for the operation. In the revised script, the two lovers argue, and the girl is injured when she tumbles down the stairs. Originally, Boris Karloff played a small role in the film as a surgeon, which was cut from the film by censors, and the Karloff footage no longer exists.

== Reception ==
=== Critical ===
Mordaunt Hall of The New York Times wrote, "Although Alias the Doctor, Richard Barthelmess's latest film, which reached the Winter Garden last night, has been produced with praise-worthy earnestness and painstaking attention to surgical details, it is not precisely an entertaining subject … The story is a routine affair with unconvincing characterizations, but it has some interesting introductory incidents, and the closing episode is worked out effectively." Hall was more favourable in his opinion of the performances and commented, "Mr. Barthelmess does as well as is possible in the circumstances with his rôle. Karl is, however, too good to be real. Norman Foster does well enough with the part of Stephan. Marian Marsh is attractive as Lottie and Lucille La Verne is effective as Frau Brenner."

=== Box office ===
According to Warner Bros. records, the film earned $460,000 domestically, and $181,000 foreign.
