= Svengali (1931 film) =

1931 film

- Window card for Svengali
- Directed by: Archie Mayo
- Screenplay by: J. Grubb Alexander
- Based on: Trilby; 1894 novel by George du Maurier
- Produced by: Jack L. Warner
- Starring: John Barrymore; Marian Marsh; Bramwell Fletcher; Donald Crisp; Carmel Myers
- Cinematography: Barney McGill
- Edited by: William Holmes
- Production company: Warner Bros.-First National
- Release date: 1 May 1931 (New York)
- Running time: 81 minutes
- Country: United States

Svengali is a 1931 American pre-Code drama film directed by Archie Mayo. The film stars John Barrymore and Marian Marsh. It is based on the 1894 George du Maurier novel Trilby and was among the many film adaptations of the book. The film was shot from January 12 to February 21, 1931. On its release in the United States, Svengali received some positive reviews but did not perform well at the box office.

== Plot ==
When attractive but untalented Madame Honori confesses to her sinister singing teacher Svengali that she has left her husband, and refuses to accept her ex's settlement offer of money, he fixes her with an intense stare that drives her screaming from the room. A short time later, her body is found in the Seine. Untouched by her death, Svengali and his flatmate Gecko visit the studio of English artists the Laird, Taffy and Billee in search of a meal. On leaving, they meet a lovely young milkmaid and artist's model, Trilby O'Ferrall. Svengali is enchanted by her, but she falls in love with the handsome, young Billee. One day, under the pretext of curing her headache, Svengali hypnotizes her and thereafter is able to control her by the power of his thoughts.

When Billee discovers Trilby posing nude for a group of artists, they quarrel, and Svengali convinces her to fake a suicide and leave Paris with him. Five years later, as "Madame Svengali" the singer, she has become the toast of Europe with the help of his powers. Her old friends attend her Paris debut and they are astonished to see the woman who they thought was dead. Determined to win her back from Svengali, Billee unfailingly attends all of her performances. His powers weakened by the strength of her attachment to Billee, Svengali must keep canceling performances until, finally, her schedule is reduced to an engagement in an Egyptian cabaret. When Svengali suffers an "attack," his powers over Trilby fail; she falters and sings horribly off key. As he dies from the attack, he begs to be granted Trilby's love in death as he never was in life. As if in response, she then dies in Billee's arms, whispering, “Svengali….”

== Cast ==
- John Barrymore as Svengali
- Marian Marsh as Trilby O'Farrell
- Donald Crisp as The Laird
- Bramwell Fletcher as Billee
- Carmel Myers as Madame Honori
- Luis Alberni as Gecko
- Lumsden Hare as Monsieur Taffy
- Paul Porcasi as Bonelli
- Ferike Boros as Marta (uncredited)

== Style ==
The question of whether Svengali is a horror film has been debated for many years. The film is not included in Phil Hardy's The Encyclopedia of Horror Movies (1986) but William K. Everson contextualized the film in relationship to the Hollywood horror cycle in 1973 in The New School Program Notes. Ellen Draper was described as "merely assuming" the film belonged to the genre while writing about it in 1988 because of its heroines.

== Production ==
=== Background ===
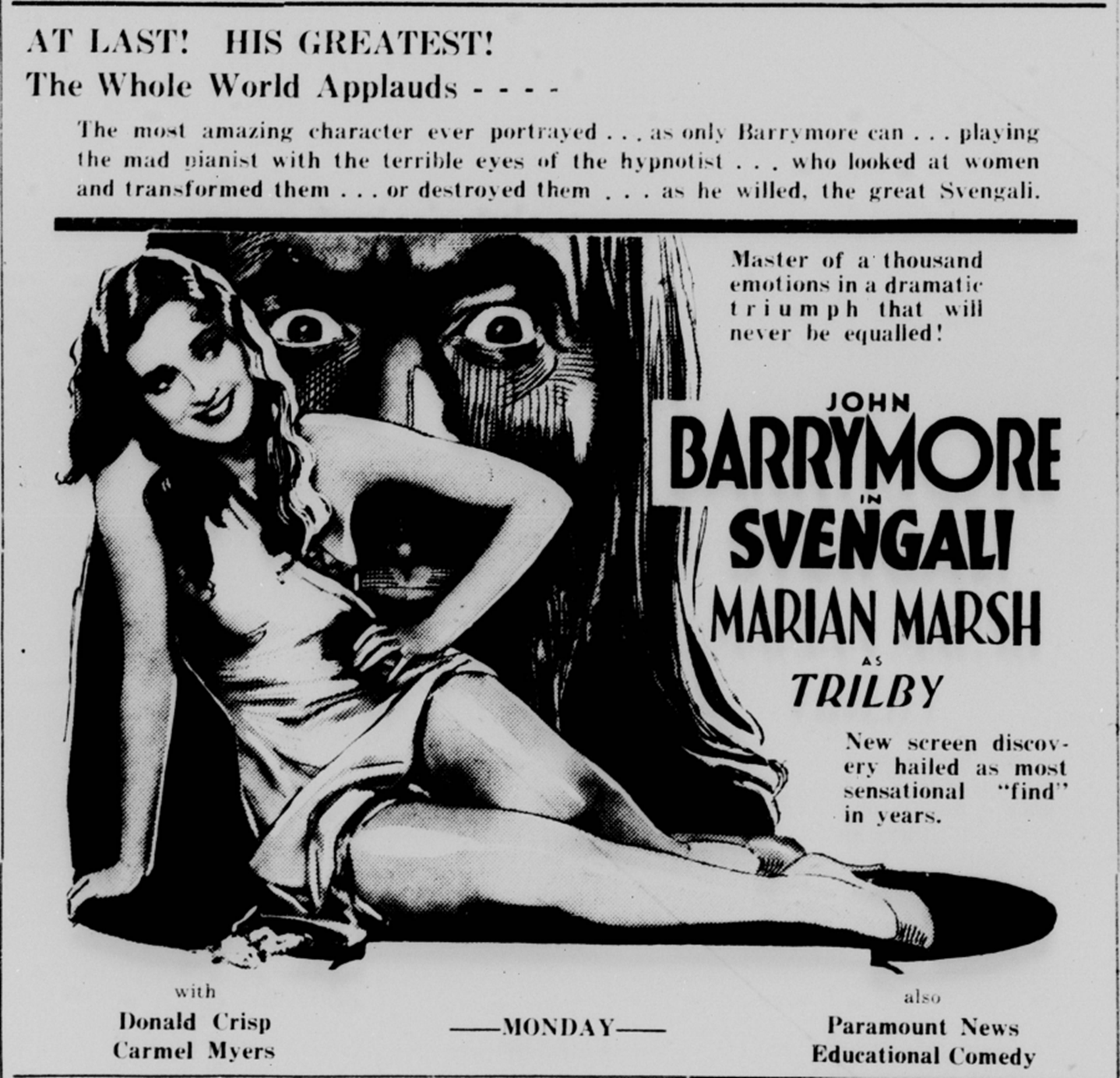
Theatrical advertisement from 1931

Svengali was based on the 1894 George du Maurier novel Trilby. The novel is titled after the story's doomed heroine, but the character that caught the public's attention was the villain Svengali, a Jewish hypnotist and pianist who hypnotizes Trilby into becoming a great vocalist. The success of Trilby was a surprise to du Maurier as the novel was adapted to the stage, where Sir Herbert Beerbohm Tree performed as Svengali in the United Kingdom and Wilton Lackaye portrayed him in 1895 in the United States. At least six silent film adaptations of Trilby were made, ranging from 1908's Trilby to 1923.

Actor John Barrymore had performed on Broadway in early du Maurier adaptations, including the title role in Peter Ibbetson. In November 1930, Louella Parsons reported "the most surprising news of the year" that Warner Bros. had purchased the rights to adapt Trilby and that Barrymore was set to play the role of Svengali.

=== Pre-production ===
While on his yacht, Barrymore cabled his ideas for the film to Warner Bros., specifying that Svengali "must be funny and get lots of laughs." Warner Bros. initially wanted Evelyn Laye for the role of Trilby. Stories conflict as to why Laye was not cast; one account holds that the actress wanted to return to England for a vacation while another story claims that Laye was exhausted from overwork and was under treatment in a sanitarium. After testing many candidates, including big names, Warner Bros. hired relative unknown Marian Marsh for the role of Trilby.

The cinematographer was Barney "Chick" McGill, who was director Archie Mayo's cameraman for The Doorway to Hell.

=== Production ===
Svengali began shooting in January 1931 at Stage 8 at Warner Bros.' First National lot in Burbank. Filming was completed on February 21. According to daily production notes, the script was unfinished when filming began, with screenwriter J. Grubb Alexander writing the scenes one at a time.

On February 14, production was moved to Universal City, where Warner Bros. rented Universal's Phantom Stage, used originally for The Phantom of the Opera (1925).

== Release ==
Svengali (1931)

Svengali opened in New York City at Warners Hollywood Theatre on May 1, 1931, and in Los Angeles at Warner Hollywood and Downtown Theatres on May 22, 1931. In its first three days in New York, Svengali took in $17,384, which film historian Gregory William Mank described as "decent money, but hardly sensational." In its first week at the Warners Hollywood Theatre, Svengali earned $30,002, and in the following week, $25,441. In comparison, the Warner Bros. pictures The Public Enemy earned $63,776 in its first week. The film had large crowds on its opening day in Los Angeles, but otherwise did poor box office. With a budget of $499,000 to be produced, the film only made a worldwide rental of $498,000. In comparison, Dracula had $1,200,000 in worldwide rentals. The film had a loss of $241,000.

== Reception ==
The Film Daily discussed the film following its New York premiere, stating that the film was "creeping, intense, human and at times believable," noting that John Barrymore was "brilliant" in the role and that the production was "elaborate, the cast splendid, and the background kept with the feline atmosphere of the story." New York Times film critic Mordaunt Hall also praised Barrymore's Svengali, stating that his performance "surpasses anything he has done for the screen, including the motion pictures of Stevenson's Dr. Jekyll and Mr. Hyde and Clyde Fitch's Beau Brummel." Variety wrote that Barrymore "takes care of everything. So much that they won't go away remembering much of anybody or anything else [...] Barrymore's hypnotic powers are interesting until getting a look at Miss Marsh under an unbecoming wig. After which a lot of people will figure it's a waste of expert concentration." Los Angeles Times critic Edwin Schallert praised the film as a "classic revived," marked by "its excellent irony and sinister interest [...] smoother, quieter, with a diminishing of the forced and somewhat self-conscious style".

Cinematographer Barney McGill and set designer Anton Grot received nominations at the Academy Awards for their work in Svengali.
