= Crime and Punishment (1935 American film) =

1935 American film directed by Josef von Sternberg

- Promotional poster
- Directed by: Josef von Sternberg
- Written by: Joseph Anthony; S.K. Lauren
- Based on: Crime and Punishment; 1866 novel by Fyodor Dostoevsky
- Produced by: B.P. Schulberg
- Starring: Peter Lorre; Edward Arnold; Marian Marsh; Tala Birell; Gene Lockhart; Mrs Patrick Campbell
- Cinematography: Lucien Ballard
- Edited by: Richard Cahoon
- Music by: R.H. Bassett; Louis Silvers
- Production company: B.P. Schullberg Productions
- Distributed by: Columbia Pictures
- Release date: November 21, 1935
- Running time: 88 minutes
- Country: United States
- Language: English

Crime and Punishment is a 1935 American drama film directed by Josef von Sternberg for Columbia Pictures. The screenplay was adapted by Joseph Anthony and S.K. Lauren from Fyodor Dostoevsky's 1866 novel of the same title. The film stars Peter Lorre in the lead role of Raskolnikov (here named Roderick instead of Rodion).

Von Sternberg, who was contractually obliged to make the film, disliked it, later writing that it was "no more related to the true text of the novel than the corner of Sunset Boulevard and Gower is related to the Russian environment."

The Library of Congress holds a print.

== Synopsis ==
The American Film Institute provides a summary of the film's narrative:

In Russia, university student Roderick Raskolnikov graduates with honors. Even though he is hailed as an authority on crime, Roderick lives in poverty. When Roderick learns that his family is coming to visit, he decides to pawn the heirloom watch he received for graduation. At the pawnbroker's, Roderick sees a young streetwalker, Sonya, receive only one ruble for her valuable Bible, and when she is pushed out the door by the pawnbroker, she loses the ruble. When Roderick learns that Sonya supports her family, he gives her the rubles he receives for his watch. Later, Roderick's mother and sister, Toni, arrive at his apartment, and he learns that Toni lost her job because her employer's husband, Grilov, tried to force himself on her.

With the family in dire poverty, Toni has agreed to marry the pompous, aging Lushin.

Angry at Toni for selling herself to Lushin, and desperately in need of money, Roderick kills the cruel old pawnbroker, and rummages through her room for valuables. The next day, Roderick is arrested, not for the pawnbroker's murder but for overdue rent. Inspector Porfiry is eager to meet the criminal expert, and he has Roderick observe the interrogation of an innocent prisoner suspected of the pawnbroker's murder.

Porfiry, who has solved all crimes assigned to him, confides to Roderick that he is willing to send an innocent man to prison in order to maintain his record. Later, Roderick goes to the office of the Current Review and the editor, excited over the response to Roderick's last article, agrees to give him 1,000 rubles for another article. Certain that he is not suspected of the crime, Roderick returns to see his family, where he mocks Lushin, and in doing so, ends Toni's engagement. Meanwhile, Sonya is questioned by Porfiry, and his suspicions about Roderick are aroused. Roderick then shows up at the police station, and Porfiry invites himself to meet his family, who he questions vociferously until Roderick forces him to apologize. Later, Grilov arrives and tells Roderick that he is now a widower, then offers Toni 500 rubles as compensation for his actions.

Now wracked by his conscience, Roderick visits Porfiry, who admits that he suspects him; however, the innocent man confesses, thus causing Roderick to feel more guilt. Roderick goes to Sonya, and terrifies her with crazy talk, and she begins to read the Bible to him. No longer able to endure his guilt, Roderick confesses while Grilov listens outside the door. Grilov then tries to blackmail Toni, but relents when he sees her hatred of him. Meanwhile, Roderick returns to his apartment and finds Porfiry, who accuses him of the crime and threatens to send the innocent man to Siberia and leave the injustice on Roderick's conscience.

Roderick goes to Toni, who is now engaged to his friend Dmitri, and asks her to look after their mother and Sonya in his absence. As Roderick leaves, Sonya asks him to leave the country with her, but he asks her to wait for him, and they go to Porfiry's office together.

== Cast ==
- Peter Lorre as Roderick Raskolnikov
- Edward Arnold as Inspector Porfiry
- Marian Marsh as Sonya
- Tala Birell as Antonya Raskolnikov
- Elizabeth Risdon as Mrs. Raskolnikov
- Robert Allen as Dmitri
- Douglas Dumbrille as Grilov
- Gene Lockhart as Lushin
- Charles Waldron as University President
- Thurston Hall as Editor
- Johnny Arthur as Clerk
- Mrs. Patrick Campbell as Pawnbroker

== Production ==
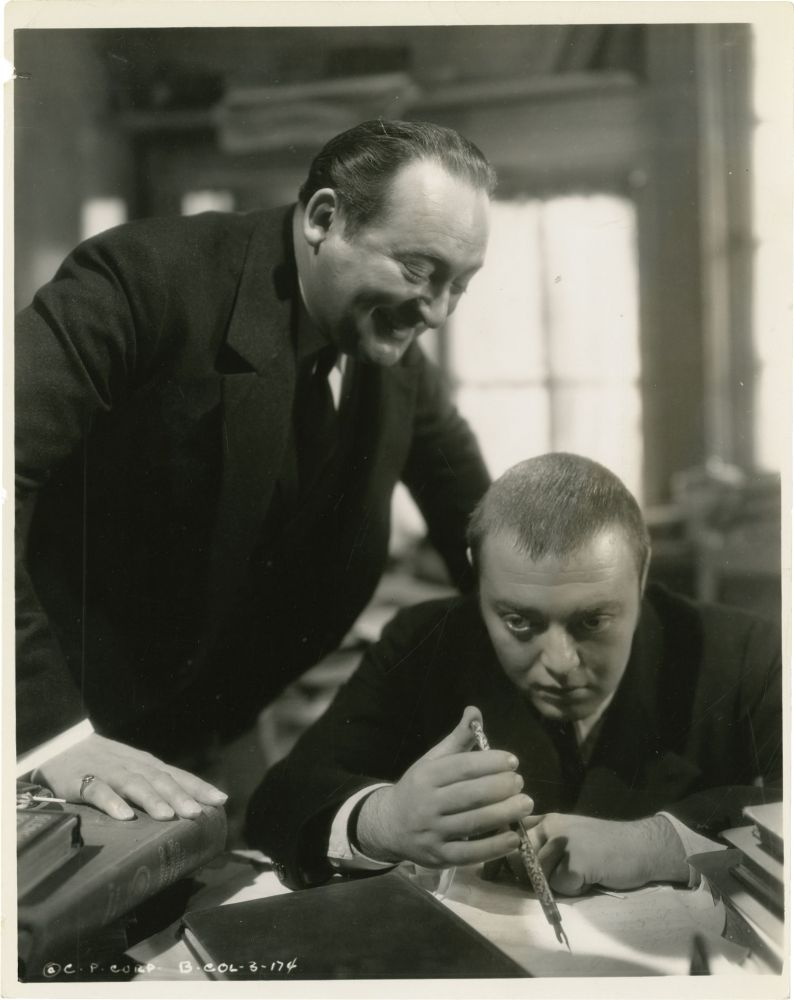
Inspector Porfiry (Edward Arnold) and Raskolnikov (Peter Lorre)

Sternberg and Paramount studios ended their eight-year affiliation with the completion of The Devil is a Woman, the director's seventh and final collaboration with actress Marlene Dietrich.

Producer B. P. Schulberg, recently expelled from Paramount, joined Harry Cohn's Columbia Pictures and quickly brought Sternberg on board in a two-picture contract with the "poorly financed" studio.

Dostoyevsky's psychological exploration of a murderer, his remorse and redemption posed an immense challenge for cinematic rendering "as there could be no visual equivalent [for] the author's detailed reasoning and elaborate description of [his characters] mental attitudes." Harry Cohn approved the project in part because Crime and Punishment, first published in 1866, was in the public domain and would require no copyright fees. Crime and Punishment exemplifies a trend in Hollywood of the 1930s towards elevating feature film credentials through adapting classical literature "to lend an air of prestige" to the film industry.

The "odd cast", bestowed upon Sternberg, included a mix of Columbia contract artists as well as "supers"—freelance players engaged without a contract, for a modest fee—that satisfied Columbia's budgetary constraints.

Production code officials had reviewed a recent stage adaption of the novel and warned that the narrative describes "a failure of the police to arrest and prosecute the young college student [Raskolnikov]" and that "serious thematic difficulties will be encountered because of the characterization of the heroine [Sonya] as a prostitute. This characterization is a definite part of the plot."

Sternberg, recognizing the complexities inherent to the novel, prudently chose to compose a straightforward genre film "about a detective and a criminal."

== Critical reception ==
Writing for The Spectator in 1936, Graham Greene gave the film a poor review, noting that despite the fine acting of Peter Lorre, this version of Crime and Punishment was entirely too vulgar. Greene commented that the original Russian story of "religious and unhappy mind" had been altered in this picture into a "lunch-bar-chromium version" with idealism, ethics, and optimism "of a salesman who has never failed to sell his canned beans". He recommended Crime et Châtiment as a much better version of the story.

== Sources ==
- American Film Institute. 2017. Crime and Punishment (1935). Movie details, History section. Retrieved 2 July 2018. https://catalog.afi.com/Catalog/MovieDetails/4127
- Beltzer, Thomas. 2004. Crime and Punishment: A Neglected Classic. Senses of Cinema. Retrieved 2 July 2018. http://sensesofcinema.com/2004/cteq/crime_and_punishment/
- Baxter, John. 1971. The Cinema of Josef von Sternberg. The International Film Guide Series. A.S Barners & Company, New York.
- Beltzer, Thomas. 2004. Crime and Punishment: A Neglected Classic. Senses of Cinema. Retrieved 2 July 2018. http://sensesofcinema.com/2004/cteq/crime_and_punishment/
- Sarris, Andrew. 1966. The Films of Josef von Sternberg. Museum of Modern Art/Doubleday. New York, New York.
- Supten, Tom. 2006. Auteur in Distress: On Wallace Beery, von Sternberg, and Sergeant Madden. Bright Lights Film Journal. Retrieved 12 July 2018. http://brightlightsfilm.com/auteur-distress-wallace-beery-von-sternberg-sergeant-madden/#.W0ea_ZCWyUk
- Swanbeck, Laura. 2013. The Crank: 'Crime and Punishment' Program Notes. UCLA Film and Television Archive. Retrieved 2 July 2018. http://www.tft.ucla.edu/mediascape/blog/the-crank-crime-and-punishment-program-notes-41113-screening/
