= Marian Marsh =

American actress (1913–2006)

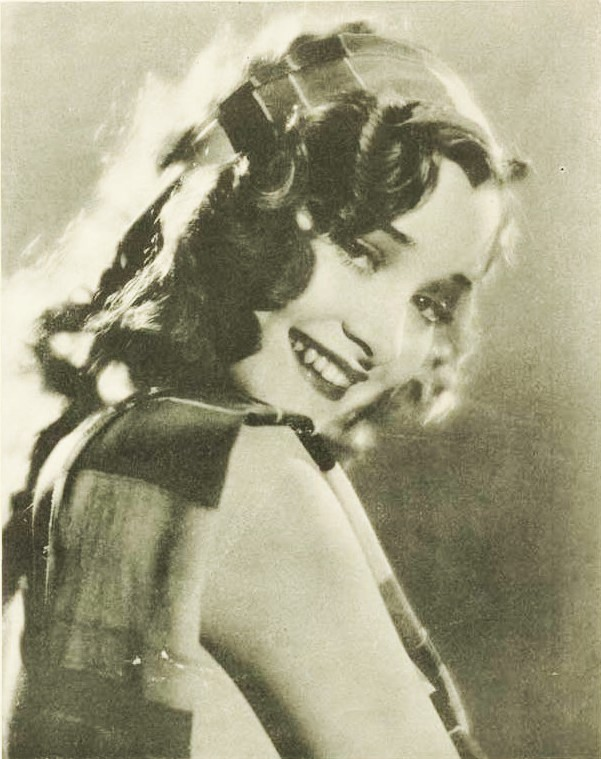
- Marsh in 1932
- Born: Violet Ethelred Krauth; October 17, 1913; Trinidad and Tobago
- Died: November 9, 2006 (aged 93); Palm Desert, California, U.S.
- Resting place: Desert Memorial Park, Cathedral City, California
- Other names: Marilyn Morgan; Marian Henderson
- Occupation: Actress
- Years active: 1929–1958
- Spouses: Albert P. Scott (m. 1938; div. 1959) Clifford Henderson (m. 1960; died 1984)
- Children: 2
- Relatives: Jean Fenwick (sister)

Marian Marsh (born Violet Ethelred Krauth; October 17, 1913 – November 9, 2006) was an American film actress and later an environmentalist.

== Early life ==
Violet Ethelred Krauth was born on October 17, 1913, in Trinidad, British West Indies (now Trinidad and Tobago), the youngest of four children of a German chocolate manufacturer and, as noted by encyclopaedist Leslie Halliwell in his book The Filmgoer's Companion, his French-English wife.

Owing to World War I, Marsh's father moved his family to Boston, Massachusetts. By the time she was 10, the family had relocated to Hollywood, California. Her older sister, Harriet, an actress who went by the name of Jean Fenwick and Jean Morgan, landed a job as a contract player with FBO Studios.

Marsh attended Le Conte Junior High School and Hollywood High School. In 1928 she was approached by silent screen actress Nance O'Neil, who offered her speech and movement lessons, and with her sister Jean's help, she soon entered the movies. She secured a contract with Pathé, where she was featured in many short subjects under the name Marilyn Morgan.

She was seen in small roles in Howard Hughes's classic Hell's Angels (1930) and Eddie Cantor's lavish Technicolor musical Whoopee! (1930). The part in Whoopee! resulted from Marsh's visit to a film studio with her sister. Not long afterwards, she was signed by Warner Bros. and her name was changed to Marian Marsh.

In 1930, at age 17, Marsh had the female lead in Young Sinners, a play at the Belasco Theater. A contemporary news article reported that she "has scored a distinct hit" in her first stage production.

== Hollywood success ==
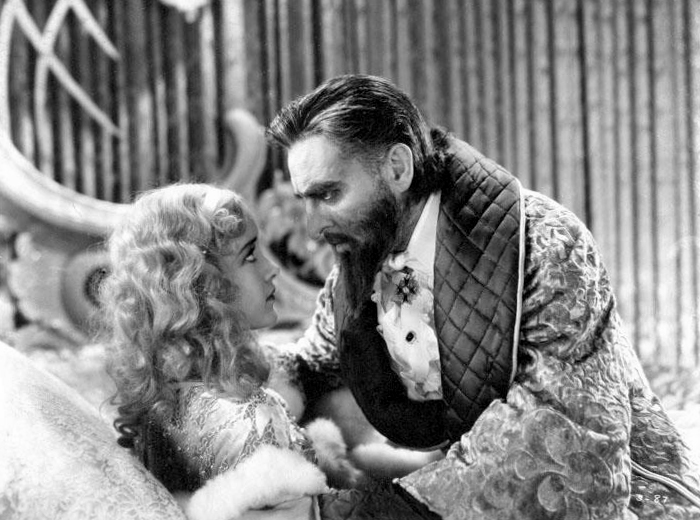
Marsh and John Barrymore in Svengali (1931)

In 1931, after appearing in a number of short films, Marsh landed one of her most important roles in Svengali opposite John Barrymore. Marsh was chosen by Barrymore for the role of Trilby. Barrymore, who had selected her partly because she resembled his wife, coached her performance throughout the picture's filming.

Marsh was named as one of the WAMPAS Baby Stars in August 1931 even before her second movie with Warner Bros. was released. With her ability to project warmth, sincerity and inner strength on the screen along with critical praise and the audience's approval of Svengali, she continued to star in a string of successful films for Warner Bros., including Five Star Final (1931) with Edward G. Robinson, The Mad Genius (1931) with Barrymore, The Road to Singapore (1931) with William Powell, Under 18 (1932) with Warren William, Alias the Doctor (1932) with Richard Barthelmess, and Beauty and the Boss (1932) with Warren William.

In 1932, in the midst of a grueling work schedule, Marsh left Warner Bros. and moved to RKO, where she made Strange Justice (1932) with Norman Foster and The Sport Parade (1932) with Joel McCrea. After that, she took several film offers in Europe that lasted until 1934. She enjoyed working in England and Germany, as well as vacationing in Paris. While in England, she appeared in the musical comedy film Over the Garden Wall (1934). Back in the United States, she appeared as the heroine Elnora in a popular adaptation of the perennial favorite A Girl of the Limberlost (1934).

In 1935, Marsh signed a two-year pact with Columbia Pictures. During this time, she starred in such films as The Black Room (1935) regarded as one of Boris Karloff's best horror films of the decade, Josef von Sternberg's classic Crime and Punishment (1935) with Peter Lorre, wherein she played the sympathetic prostitute Sonya, Lady of Secrets (1936) with Ruth Chatterton, Counterfeit (1936) with Chester Morris, The Man Who Lived Twice (1936) with Ralph Bellamy, and Come Closer, Folks (1936) with James Dunn.

When her contract expired in 1937, Marsh once again freelanced, appearing steadily in movies for RKO Radio Pictures, where she made Saturday's Heroes (1937) with Van Heflin, and for Paramount Pictures, where she played a young woman caught up in a mystery in The Great Gambini (1937). She appeared with comic Joe E. Brown in When's Your Birthday? (1937), and Richard Arlen in Missing Daughters (1939). In the 1940s, Marsh played Wallace Ford's secretary in Murder by Invitation (1941) and the self-willed wife in Gentleman from Dixie (1941). In her last screen appearance, Marsh portrayed the daughter of an inventor in the comedy/mystery House of Errors (1942), which starred Harry Langdon.

In the late 1950s, she appeared with John Forsythe in an episode of his TV series Bachelor Father and in an episode of the TV series Schlitz Playhouse of Stars before retiring in 1959.

== Personal life ==
Marsh married a stockbroker named Albert Scott on March 29, 1938, and had two children with him, Catherine Mary Scott (1942–2018) and Albert Parker Scott Jr. (1944–2014). They divorced in 1959. In 1960, Marsh married Cliff Henderson, an aviation pioneer and entrepreneur whom she had met in the early 1930s. They moved to Palm Desert, California, a town Henderson founded in the 1940s.

In the 1960s, Marsh founded Desert Beautiful, a non-profit all-volunteer conservation organization to promote environmental and beautification programs.

Cliff Henderson died in 1984 and Marsh remained in Palm Desert until her death.

== Death ==
In 2006, at age 93, Marsh died of respiratory arrest while sleeping at her home in Palm Desert. She is buried at Desert Memorial Park in Cathedral City, California.

== Complete filmography ==
- The Sophomore (1929) (uncredited)
- Don't Believe It (1930 short)
- Hell's Angels (1930) as Girl Selling Kisses
- Whoopee! (1930) as Harriett Underwood (uncredited)
- The Naughty Flirt (1931) as Kay's Friend (uncredited)
- Svengali (1931) as Trilby O'Farrell
- Under Eighteen (1931) as Margie Evans
- Five Star Final (1931) as Jenny Townsend
- The Road to Singapore (1931) as Rene March
- The Mad Genius (1931) as Nana Carlova
- Alias the Doctor (1932) as Lotti Brenner
- Beauty and the Boss (1932) as Susie Sachs
- Strange Justice (1932) as Rose
- The Sport Parade (1932) as Irene Stewart
- The Eleventh Commandment (1933) as Corinne Ross
- Daring Daughters (1933) as Terry Cummings
- Notorious But Nice (1933) as Jenny Jones
- A Man of Sentiment (1933) as Julia Wilkens
- Love at Second Sight (1934) as Juliet
- I Like It That Way (1934) as Joan Anderson
- Over the Garden Wall (1934) as Mary
- The Prodigal Son (1934) as Miss Lillian Comstock
- A Girl of the Limberlost (1934) as Elnora Comstock
- In Spite of Danger (1935) as Sally Sullivan
- Unknown Woman (1935) as Helen Griffith
- The Black Room (1935) as Thea Hassel
- Crime and Punishment (1935) as Sonya
- Lady of Secrets (1936) as Joan
- Counterfeit (1936) as Verna Maxwell
- The Man Who Lived Twice (1936) as Janet Haydon
- Come Closer, Folks (1936) as Peggy Woods
- When's Your Birthday? (1937) as Jerry Grant
- The Great Gambini (1937) as Ann Randall
- Youth on Parole (1937) as "Bobbie" Blake
- Saturday's Heroes (1937) as Frances Thomas
- Prison Nurse (1938) as Judy
- A Desperate Adventure (1938) as Ann Carrington
- Missing Daughters (1939) as Josie Lamonte
- Fugitive from a Prison Camp (1940) as Ann Baldwin
- Murder by Invitation (1941) as Nora O'Brien
- Gentleman from Dixie (1941) as Margaret Terrill
- House of Errors (1942) as Florence Randall
