= The Keyhole (1933 film) =

1933 film

- Lobby card
- Directed by: Michael Curtiz; Arthur Greville Collins (dialogue)
- Screenplay by: Robert Presnell Sr.
- Based on: the story "Adventuress" by Alice D. G. Miller
- Produced by: Hal B. Wallis
- Starring: Kay Francis; George Brent
- Cinematography: Barney McGill
- Edited by: Ray Curtiss
- Music by: W. Franke Harling
- Distributed by: Warner Bros. Pictures
- Release date: March 25, 1933 (U.S.)
- Running time: 69 minutes
- Country: United States
- Language: English

The Keyhole is a 1933 American pre-Code comedy-drama film directed by Michael Curtiz, starring Kay Francis and George Brent, and featuring Glenda Farrell, Monroe Owsley and Allen Jenkins. It was released by Warner Bros. Pictures on March 25, 1933.

A woman with two husbands tries to divorce one of them by traveling to Havana, where things get more complicated.

== Plot ==
Anne Brooks, wife of wealthy businessman Schuyler Brooks, is being blackmailed by her former husband Maurice Le Brun, who never finalized their divorce and lied to her about it. Acting on advice from Brooks' sister, Anne books a cruise ship passage to Havana, Cuba, to lure Le Brun out of the United States so that he can be blocked from re-entering.

Suspicious of her behavior, Brooks hires private detective Neil Davis to follow her and report on whether she is having an affair, but tells him that she is merely a young woman that he's interested in. Anne leaks to Le Brun the details of her trip and he also boards the ship. Davis makes contact with her and sends reports to Brooks that she is not having an affair, but begins to develop a romance with her himself.

Back in New York, Brooks learns about the blackmailing from his sister and leaves on a plane to Cuba to apologize to Anne for being suspicious. Meanwhile, Anne reveals to Davis that she is married to Brooks and that she is being blackmailed and he reveals that he is a private detective hired by Brooks to follow her.

Le Brun arrives at Anne's hotel room for his payoff. To save Anne's marriage, Davis persuades him to leave via the balcony so that Brooks won't find him in a compromising situation with her, but just as Brooks comes into the room, Anne kisses Davis, telling Brooks that their marriage is over. Le Brun falls from the balcony to his death, ending any further threat of blackmail.

== Cast ==
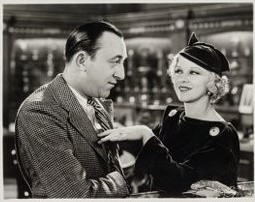
Allen Jenkins and Glenda Farrell in The Keyhole (1933)

- Kay Francis as Anne Brooks, married to Schuyler Brooks
- George Brent as Neil Davis, a private detective hired by Schuyler Brooks
- Glenda Farrell as Dot
- Monroe Owsley as Maurice Le Brun, Anne's former husband
- Allen Jenkins as Hank Wales, Davis' "valet"
- Helen Ware as Portia Brooks, Schuyler Brooks' sister
- Henry Kolker as Schuyler Brooks
- Ferdinand Gottschalk as Brooks' lawyer
- George Chandler as Joe, the hotel desk clerk
