= Gentleman from Dixie =

1941 film

- Directed by: Albert Herman
- Written by: Fred Myton
- Produced by: Edward Finney
- Starring: Jack La Rue; Marian Marsh; Clarence Muse
- Cinematography: Marcel Le Picard
- Edited by: Fred Bain
- Music by: Frank Sanucci
- Production company: Edward F. Finney Productions
- Distributed by: Monogram Pictures
- Release date: September 2, 1941
- Running time: 63 minutes
- Country: United States
- Language: English

Gentleman from Dixie is a 1941 American drama film directed by Albert Herman and starring Jack La Rue, Marian Marsh and Clarence Muse. It was distributed by Monogram Pictures.

== Synopsis ==
A man released from jail for a crime he didn't' commit goes to live with his brother's family on their Louisiana farm, helping train racehorses.

== Cast ==
- Jack La Rue as Thad Terrill
- Marian Marsh as Margaret Terrill
- Clarence Muse as Jupe
- Mary Ruth as Betty Jean Terrill
- Robert Kellard as Lance Terrill
- John Holland as Brawley
- Lillian Randolph as Aunt Eppie
- John Elliott as Prosecutor
- Herbert Rawlinson as Prison Warden
- I. Stanford Jolley as Kirkland
- Joe Hernandez as Race Announcer
- Phyllis Barry as Secretary
- Clarence Muse Singers as Singers

== Bibliography ==
- S. Torriano Berry, Venise T. Berry. The A to Z of African American Cinema. Scarecrow Press, 2009.
