= William Holmes (film editor) =

American film editor (1904–1978)

- Born: William Jefferson Holmes; February 23, 1904; Illinois, USA
- Died: February 2, 1978 (aged 73); Los Angeles, California, USA
- Occupation: Film editor
- Years active: 1925–1942

William Jefferson Holmes (February 23, 1904 – February 2, 1978) was an American film editor. He won an Oscar for Best Film Editing at the 14th Academy Awards for his work on the film Sergeant York.

He worked on 56 different films from 1925 to 1942.

== Selected filmography ==
- Flying Luck (1927)
- Dugan of the Dugouts (1928)
- Romance of a Rogue (1928)
- Thundergod (1928)
- A Perfect Gentleman (1928)
- The Aviator (1929)
- Gold Diggers of Broadway (1929)
- Hardboiled Rose (1929)
- Million Dollar Collar (1929)
- Hold Everything (1930)
- The Life of the Party (1930)
- The Second Floor Mystery (1930)
- Three Faces East (1930)
- Illicit (1931)
- Manhattan Parade (1931)
- Svengali (1931)
- Alias the Doctor (1932)
- I Am a Fugitive from a Chain Gang (1932)
- Dark Victory (1939)
- Sergeant York (1941)
- They Died with Their Boots On (1941)
