= Nat Pendleton =

Olympic wrestler and actor (1895–1967)

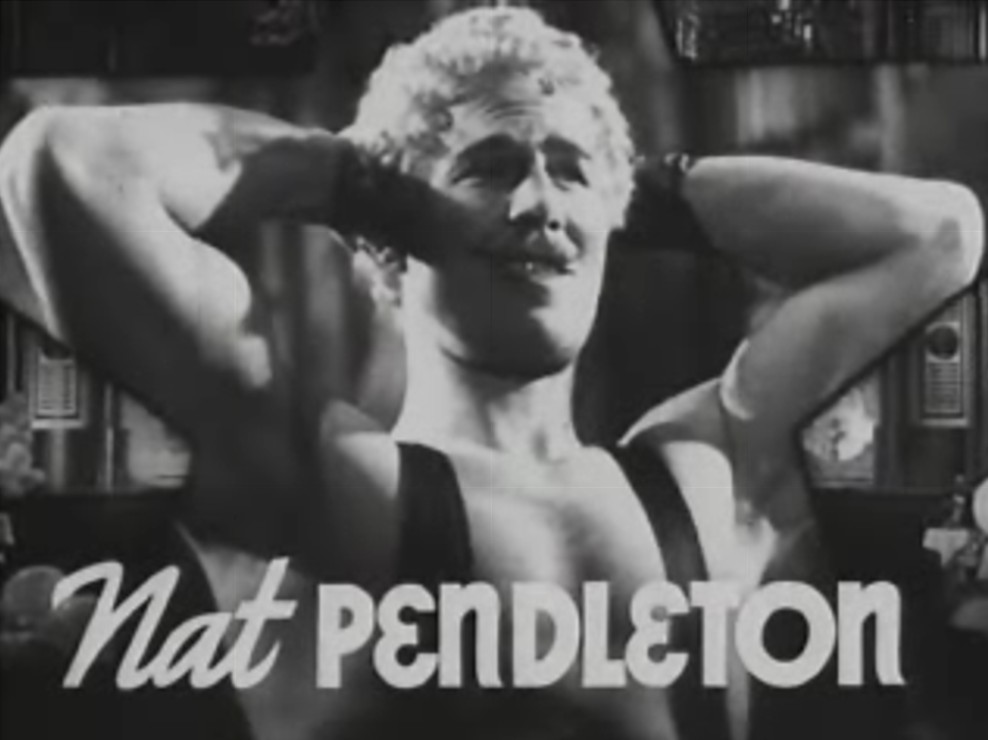
- Frame from trailer for The Great Ziegfeld (1936)
- Born: Nathaniel Greene Pendleton; August 9, 1895; Davenport, Iowa, U.S.
- Died: October 12, 1967 (aged 72); San Diego, California, U.S.
- Education: Columbia University (BA)
- Occupations: Actor, wrestler
- Years active: 1913–1956
- Spouses: Juanita Alfonzo (m. 1920–1924): Margaret E. Carse (m. 19??)
- Relatives: Steve Pendleton (brother); Edmund J. Pendleton (brother); Arthur V. Johnson (uncle)

Medal record

Men's freestyle wrestling

Representing the United States

Olympic Games
Silver medal – second place	1920 Antwerp	Heavyweight

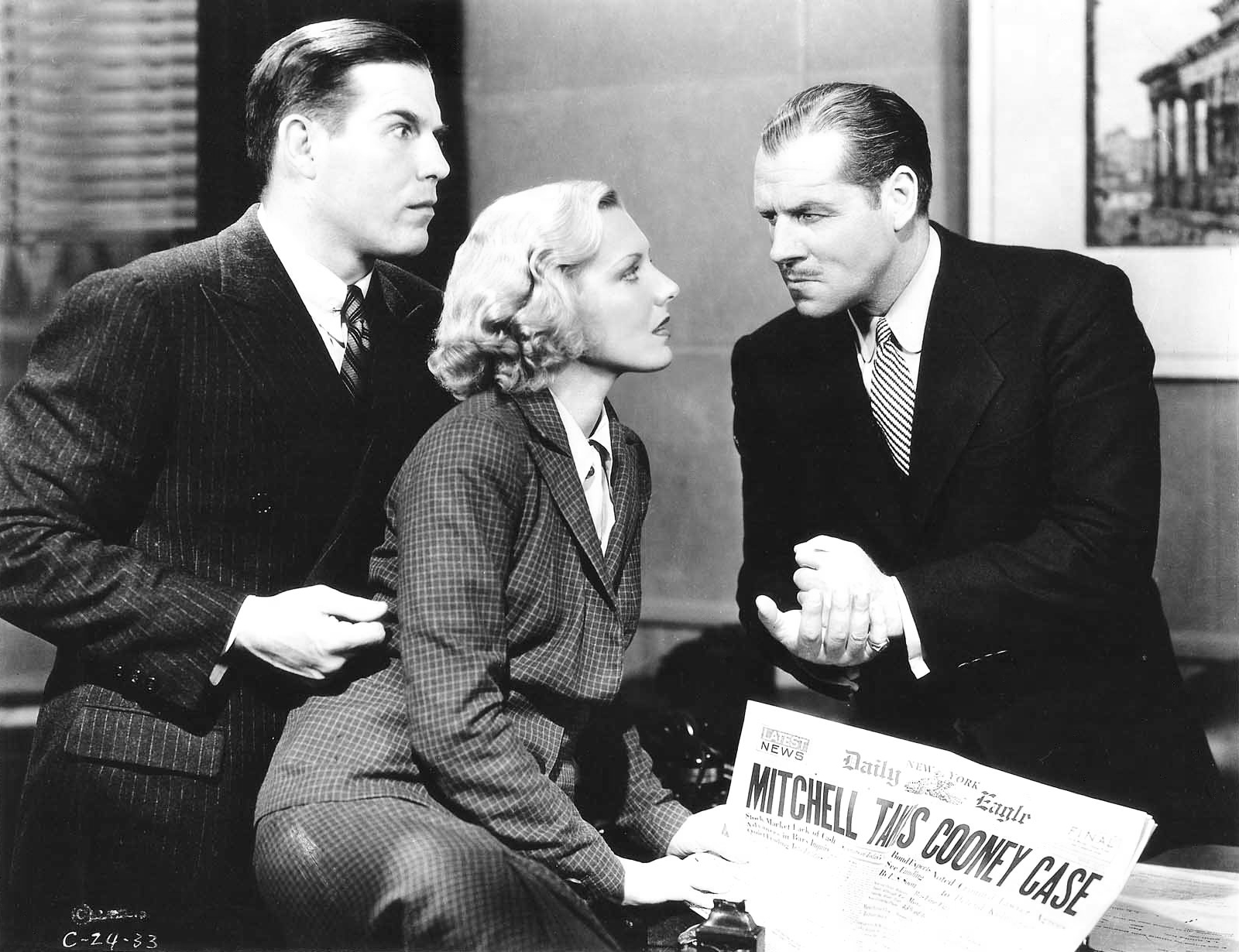
Nat Pendleton, Jean Arthur, Jack Holt in a promotional photo for the 1934 film, The Defense Rests

Nathaniel Greene Pendleton (August 9, 1895 – October 12, 1967) was an American Olympic wrestler, film actor, and stage performer. His younger brother, Edmund J. Pendleton (1899–1987), was a well-known music composer and choir master and organist for the American Church in Paris.

== Early life ==
Pendleton was born in Davenport, Iowa, to Adelaide Elizabeth (née Johnson) Pendleton (1873–1960) and Nathaniel Greene Pendleton (1861–1914), an attorney, who was a descendant of American Revolutionary general Nathanael Greene. By March 1899, the Pendletons had moved to Cincinnati, and then later to New York. Nat went to Brooklyn's Poly Prep High School. He studied economics at Columbia University, graduating with a bachelor's degree in 1916. Pendleton spoke four languages, and was inducted into the Columbia wrestling hall of fame in 2006.

== Wrestling career ==
Pendleton began his wrestling career at Columbia University, and served as captain of the school's wrestling team. He was Eastern Intercollegiate Wrestling Association (EIWA) champion in 1914 and 1915. Chosen to compete on the United States wrestling team at the 1920 Summer Olympics in Antwerp, Belgium, he earned a silver medal in a controversial final match. His Olympic coach George Pinneo later recalled that loss as the "most unpopular of many unsatisfactory decisions" in the 1920 wrestling olympics, and his teammate Fred Meyer stated, "Pendleton was the winner of that contest, no ifs or buts."

Returning to the US Pendleton became a professional wrestler and teamed up with promoter Jack Curley. Aggressively promoting him, Curleynd issued a series of haughty challenges, among them boasting that Pendleton could beat Ed "Strangler" Lewis and any other wrestler on the same night. Ferocious future National Wrestling Association World Heavyweight Champion John Pesek was enlisted to face Pendleton, and in a legitimate contest held on January 25, 1923, Pesek defeated and injured Pendleton. Pendleton continued to wrestle professionally into the 1930s.

== Stage career ==
- Naughty Cinderella (Nov 09, 1925 - Feb 20, 1926) as "K. O." Bill Smith
- The Grey Fox (Oct 22, 1928 - Jan 05, 1929) as Don Michelotto
- My Girl Friday (Feb 12, 1929 - Sep 1929) as Marcel the Great

== Film career ==
Pendleton began appearing in Hollywood films in uncredited parts and minor roles by the mid-1920s. Pendleton was cast in at least 94 short films and features, most often being typecast in supporting roles, usually as "befuddled good guys" or as slow-witted thugs, gangsters, and policemen. He appeared in the 1932 comedy Horse Feathers starring the Marx Brothers, performing in that film as one of two college football players who kidnap Harpo and Chico. In the 1936 production The Great Ziegfeld, he portrays the circus strongman Eugen Sandow, a role that brought him the best reviews of his career.

Pendleton appeared again as a circus strongman in the Marx Brothers' 1939 feature At the Circus. He can be seen as well in recurring roles in two MGM film series from the 1930s and 1940s. He played Joe Wayman, the ambulance driver, in MGM's Dr. Kildare series and in its spin-off series Dr. Gillespie. He also portrayed New York police lieutenant John Guild in The Thin Man series. His final screen appearances were in the 1947 releases Scared to Death with Bela Lugosi and Buck Privates Come Home starring Abbott and Costello.

Although Pendleton's professional career outside the wrestling ring was predominantly devoted to film work, he also performed in some stage productions, including in the Broadway plays Naughty Cinderella in 1925 and The Gray Fox in 1928.

== Personal life ==
Pendleton was the nephew of pioneer actor and director of the early American silent film era, Arthur V. Johnson. His siblings include: Steve (1908–1984), an American film and television actor, and Edmund (1899–1987), a well-known music composer and choir master and organist for the American Church in Paris.

According to the 1920 census, the 25 year-old Pendleton was working as a sports manager, living in Manhattan with his 22 year-old Puerto Rican wife, Juanita (Alfonzo), and her 13 year-old brother Ramon.

== Death ==
Pendleton died of a heart attack in a San Diego, California, hospital in 1967 at the age of 72. He was survived by his second wife, Margaret Evelyn "Barbara" Carse.

== Legacy ==
Pendleton is a member of several halls of fame: the Glen Brand Wrestling Hall of Fame in Waterloo, Iowa, the Iowa Wrestling Hall of Fame in Cresco, Iowa, and the Columbia University Athletics Hall of Fame. He is the subject of a biography by Mike Chapman, which was published in 2015.

== Filmography ==
Year	Film	Role	Director	Notes
1913	The Battle of Gettysburg		Thomas H. Ince	Unconfirmed
1924	The Hoosier Schoolmaster	Bud Means	Oliver L. Sellers	
1924	Monsieur Beaucaire	Barber	Sidney Olcott	uncredited
1926	Let's Get Married	Jimmy	Gregory La Cava	
1929	The Laughing Lady	James Dugan	Victor Schertzinger	
1930	The Big Pond	Pat O'Day	Hobart Henley	
1930	La grande mare	Pat O'Day	Hobart Henley	
1930	The Last of the Duanes	Bossamer	Alfred L. Werker	Uncredited
1930	The Sea Wolf	Smoke	Alfred Santell	
1931	Seas Beneath	'Butch' Wagner	John Ford	uncredited
1931	Fair Warning	Purvis	Alfred L. Werker	
1931	Mr. Lemon of Orange	Gangster		Uncredited
1931	The Star Witness	Big Jack	William A. Wellman	
1931	The Spirit of Notre Dame	Assistant coach	Russell Mack	
1931	The Ruling Voice	Board Member	Rowland V. Lee	Uncredited
1931	Blonde Crazy	aka Pete	Roy Del Ruth	
1931	The Secret Witness	Gunner (Bodyguard)	Thornton Freeland	
1931	The Star Witness	Gunner (Bodyguard)	William A. Wellman	
1931	Manhattan Parade	Lady Godiva's Husband	Lloyd Bacon	Uncredited
1931	The Pottsville Palooka	Spike Mulligan		Short
1932	Taxi!	Truck Driver Bull Martin	Roy Del Ruth	uncredited
1932	The Beast of the City	Abe Gorman	Charles Brabin	Uncredited
1932	A Fool's Advice	Naughty Boy	Ralph Ceder	
1932	Hell Fire Austin	Bouncer	Forrest Sheldon	
1932	The Big Timer	Kid Melrose	Edward Buzzell	uncredited
1932	Play Girl	Dance Hall Plumber	Ray Enright	Scenes deleted
1932	Girl Crazy	Motorcycle Cop	William A. Seiter	Uncredited
1932	State's Attorney	the Boxer	George Archainbaud	Uncredited
1932	Attorney for the Defense	Mugg	Irving Cummings	
1932	The Tenderfoot	Joe (Jealous Husband)	Ray Enright	Uncredited
1932	By Whose Hand?	Delmar		
1932	Horse Feathers	Darwin football player MacHardie	Norman Z. McLeod	Uncredited
1932	Exposure	Maniac Killer		
1932	The Night Club Lady	Mike McDougal	Irving Cummings	
1932	Deception	Bucky O'Neill	Lewis Seiler	Story by Nat Pendleton; script by Harold Tarshis
1932	The Sign of the Cross	Strabo	Cecil B. DeMille	
1932	Flesh	Wrestler	John Ford	Uncredited
1933	Whistling in the Dark	Joe Salvatore	Charles Reisner	
1933	Parachute Jumper	Motorcycle Policeman	Alfred E. Green	uncredited
1933	Goldie Gets Along	Motorcycle Officer Cassidy	Malcolm St. Clair	
1933	Child of Manhattan	Spyrene	Edward Buzzell	
1933	The White Sister	Corporal Cessano	Victor Fleming	Uncredited
1933	Infernal Machine	French Thug	Marcel Varnel	Uncredited
1933	The Nuisance	Aloysius P. McCarthy	Jack Conway	uncredited
1933	Baby Face	Stolvich (Laborer)	Alfred E. Green	Uncredited
1933	Lady for a Day	Shakespeare	Frank Capra	
1933	Penthouse	Tony Gazotti	W. S. Van Dyke	
1933	I'm No Angel	Harry (Acrobat)	Wesley Ruggles	Uncredited
1933	The Chief	Big Mike, a Henchman	Charles Reisner	
1933	College Coach	Ladislaus Petrowski	William A. Wellman	
1934	Lazy River	Legs Caffey	George B. Seitz	
1934	Fugitive Lovers	Alfred 'Tiny' Smith	Richard Boleslavsky	
1934	Sing and Like It	T. Fenny Sylvester	William A. Seiter	
1934	Manhattan Melodrama	Spud	George Cukor (uncredited)	
1934	The Thin Man	Lieutenant John Guild	W. S. Van Dyke	
1934	The Defense Rests	Rocky	Lambert Hillyer	
1934	The Cat's-Paw	Strozzi	Sam Taylor	
1934	The Girl from Missouri	Lifeguard	Jack Conway	
1934	Straight Is the Way	Skippy	Paul Sloane	
1934	Death on the Diamond	Harry O'Toole	Edward Sedgwick	
1934	The Gay Bride	William T. 'Shoots' Magiz	Jack Conway	
1935	Times Square Lady	Mack	George B. Seitz	
1935	Baby Face Harrington	Rocky	Raoul Walsh	
1935	Reckless	Blossom	Victor Fleming	
1935	Murder in the Fleet	'Spud' Burke	Edward Sedgwick	
1935	Calm Yourself	Knuckles Benedict	George B. Seitz	
1935	Here Comes the Band	'Piccolo Pete'	Paul Sloane	
1935	It's in the Air	Henry Potke	Charles Reisner	
1935	The Garden Murder Case	Sergeant Heath	Edwin L. Marin	
1936	The Great Ziegfeld	Sandow	Robert Z. Leonard	
1936	Trapped by Television	Rocky O'Neil	Del Lord	
1936	Sworn Enemy	'Steamer' Krupp	Edwin L. Marin	
1936	The Luckiest Girl in the World	Dugan	Edward Buzzell	
1936	Two in a Crowd	Flynn	Alfred E. Green	
1936	Sing Me a Love Song	Rocky	Ray Enright	
1937	Under Cover of Night	Sergeant Lucks	George B. Seitz	
1937	Song of the City	Benvenuto Romandi	Errol Taggart	
1937	Gangway	Smiles Hogan	Sonnie Hale	
1937	Life Begins in College	George Black aka Little Black Cloud	William A. Seiter	
1938	Swing Your Lady	Joe Skopapolous	Ray Enright	
1938	Arsène Lupin Returns	Joe Doyle	George Fitzmaurice	
1938	Fast Company	Paul Terison	Edward Buzzell	
1938	The Shopworn Angel	'Dice'	H.C. Potter	
1938	The Chaser	'Floppy' Phil	Edwin L. Marin	
1938	The Crowd Roars	'Pug' Walsh	Richard Thorpe	
1938	Young Dr. Kildare	Joe Wayman	Harold S. Bucquet	
1939	Burn 'Em Up O'Connor	Buddy Buttle	Edward Sedgwick	
1939	Calling Dr. Kildare	Wayman	Harold S. Bucquet	
1939	It's a Wonderful World	Sergeant Fred Koretz	W. S. Van Dyke	
1939	6,000 Enemies	'Socks' Martin	George B. Seitz	
1939	On Borrowed Time	Mr. Grimes	Harold S. Bucquet	
1939	At the Circus	Goliath the Strongman	Edward Buzzell	
1939	Another Thin Man	Lieutenant John Guild	W. S. Van Dyke	
1939	The Secret of Dr. Kildare	Joe Wayman	Harold S. Bucquet	
1940	Northwest Passage	'Cap' Huff	King Vidor	
1940	The Ghost Comes Home	Roscoe	Wilhelm Thiele	
1940	Dr. Kildare's Strange Case	Joe Wayman, Ambulance Driver	Harold S. Bucquet	
1940	Phantom Raiders	'Gunboat' Jacklin	Jacques Tourneur	
1940	New Moon	Bondsman	W. S. Van Dyke	Uncredited
1940	The Golden Fleecing	'Fatso' Werner	Leslie Fenton	
1940	Dr. Kildare Goes Home	Wayman	Harold S. Bucquet	
1940	Dr. Kildare's Crisis	Joe Wayman	Harold S. Bucquet	
1940	Flight Command	CPO 'Spike' Knowles	Frank Borzage	
1941	Buck Privates	Sgt. Michael Collins	Arthur Lubin	
1941	Top Sergeant Mulligan	Top Sgt. Herman Mulligan	Jean Yarbrough	
1942	Jail House Blues	Sonny McGann	Albert S. Rogell	
1942	The Mad Doctor of Market Street	Red Hogan	Joseph H. Lewis	
1942	Calling Dr. Gillespie	Joe Wayman	Harold S. Bucquet	
1942	Dr. Gillespie's New Assistant	Joe Weyman	Willis Goldbeck	
1943	Dr. Gillespie's Criminal Case	Joe Wayman	Willis Goldbeck	
1943	Swing Fever	'Killer' Kennedy	Tim Whelan	
1946	Death Valley	Jim Ward	Lew Landers	
1947	Scared to Death	Bill Raymond	Christy Cabanne	
1947	Buck Privates Come Home	Sergeant Collins	Charles Barton	
1951-1959	Schlitz Playhouse	Otto "Bitsy" Lamb	Richard Whorf	TV series; final appearance
