= Escape by Night =

Escape by Night may refer to:

- Escape by Night (1937 film), an American film
- Escape by Night (1953 film), a British film starring Sid James
- Escape by Night (1960 film), an Italian war film
- Clash by Night (1963 film), a British film released as 'Escape by Night' in the United States
