= Edmund Pendleton (disambiguation) =

Edmund Pendleton (1721–1803) was a Virginia politician, lawyer and judge.

Edmund Pendleton may also refer to:

- Edmund H. Pendleton (1788–1862), U.S. Representative from New York, his great-nephew
- Edmund J. Pendleton (1899–1987), American organist, composer and conductor who lived much of his life in Paris, France

== See also ==
- Edmund Pendleton Gaines, U.S. general, another grandnephew of Edmund Pendleton (1721)
