= The Magnificent Brute (1936 film) =

1936 film

- Film poster
- Directed by: John G. Blystone
- Written by: Lewis R. Foster; Owen Francis; Bertram Millhauser
- Produced by: Edmund Grainger; Charles R. Rogers
- Starring: Victor McLaglen
- Cinematography: Merritt B. Gerstad
- Edited by: Ted J. Kent
- Music by: Arthur Lange
- Production company: Universal Pictures
- Distributed by: Universal Pictures
- Release date: October 11, 1936
- Running time: 80 minutes
- Country: United States
- Language: English

The Magnificent Brute is a 1936 American drama film directed by John G. Blystone and starring Victor McLaglen, Binnie Barnes and Jean Dixon. It was nominated for an Academy Award for Best Art Direction by Albert S. D'Agostino and Jack Otterson.

== Plot ==
Steve Andrews gets himself at a steel mill but soon makes an enemy of fellow worker Bill Morgan by winning a competition as the most productive worker and then beating him at arm wrestling. He wins the admiration of the landlady of the boarding house and her ten-year-old son but then disappoints them both by moving to another lodging and taking up with Della, the girlfriend of his rival worker. Eventually he is able to redeem himself.

== Cast ==
- Victor McLaglen as 'Big Steve' Andrews
- Binnie Barnes as Della Lane
- Jean Dixon as Blossom Finney
- William Hall as Bill Morgan
- Henry Armetta as Buzell
- Ann Preston as Mrs. Howard
- Bill Burrud as Pete Finney
- Edward Norris as Hal Howard
- Raymond Brown as Two-Up Mooney
- Selmer Jackson as Dr. Coleman
- Adrian Rosley as Papapolas
- Etta McDaniel as Lavolia
- Zeni Vatori as Brains
- Charles C. Wilson as Murphy
- Esther Dale as Mrs. Randolph
- Michael Visaroff as Pussick
- Clarence Wilson as Burke
- George Lloyd as Mike
- Harry Cording as Demetrios
- Harry Tenbrook as Waiter
- Lee Phelps as Foreman
- Cy Kendall as Chief of Police
- Wade Boteler as Cop
- Frank Mayo as Cop
- Grace Cunard as Nurse
- Gertrude Astor as Townswoman
- Marla Shelton as Town Girl
- Ethan Laidlaw as Steelworker
- Lane Chandler as Steelworker
- Lee Shumway Steelworker

== Bibliography ==
- Freese, Gene. Classic Movie Fight Scenes: 75 Years of Bare Knuckle Brawls, 1914-1989. McFarland, 2017.
