= Warpath (film) =

1951 film by Byron Haskin

- Film poster
- Directed by: Byron Haskin
- Screenplay by: Frank Gruber
- Story by: Frank Gruber
- Produced by: Nat Holt
- Starring: Edmond O'Brien; Dean Jagger; Forrest Tucker; Harry Carey Jr.
- Cinematography: Ray Rennahan
- Edited by: Philip Martin
- Music by: Paul Sawtell
- Color process: Technicolor
- Production company: Nat Holt Productions
- Distributed by: Paramount Pictures
- Release dates: August 2, 1951 (Los Angeles); November 22, 1951 (New York)
- Running time: 95 minutes
- Country: United States
- Language: English
- Box office: $1.25 million (U.S. rentals)

Warpath is a 1951 American Western film directed by Byron Haskin and starring Edmond O'Brien, Polly Bergen, Dean Jagger, Forrest Tucker and Harry Carey Jr.

== Plot ==
John Vickers, a former Union officer in the American Civil War, has spent eight years hunting the three men who murdered the woman whom he loved. He finds one of them, Woodson, who tells him that the other two have joined the cavalry before Vickers kills him.

Vickers travels to the upper western portion of Dakota Territory, where he plans to reenlist in the army as a buck private under the command of general George Armstrong Custer at Fort Abraham Lincoln in an effort to search the ranks of the cavalry. Along the way, he sees a sergeant named O'Hara manhandling an attractive young woman and intervenes. Molly Quade is grateful for his intervention, but Sgt. O'Hara exacts revenge later when Vickers comes under his command at the fort, assigning Vickers the most unpleasant menial duties.

Molly has come to the fort to help her father Sam Quade operate a general store. He is opposed to her attraction to Vickers. While on an assigned mission, a troop of soldiers led by Captain Gregson are badly outnumbered by a band of Lakota Sioux warriors until being rescued by General Custer and his troops. Vickers is recognized by Custer from his Civil War days and is promoted to the rank of first sergeant.

O'Hara realizes that Vickers suspects him as one of the killers whom he is pursuing. An ambush attempt fails, so the sergeant deserts the army and flees. A military wagon train is formed to evacuate civilians from the fort while Custer prepares wage battle against the Sioux natives near the Little Bighorn River in adjacent Montana Territory. Along the way, Molly, her father, Vickers and several others are taken captive. They see that O'Hara is also a prisoner too, and when he learns that Custer's men will be hopelessly outnumbered and slaughtered, he tries to go warn the general and sacrifices his own life running through a gauntlet line in the village, distracting the Sioux until the others led by Vickers can escape.

Molly, her father and Vickers grab some unguarded horses behind their tent and ride away, hiding from the Indians until daylight. Molly becomes aware that her father is the third killer that Sgt. Vickers has been seeking. Before she can persuade Vickers not to kill him, Sam rides to warn Custer, which will certainly lead to his own death.

== Cast ==
- Edmond O'Brien as John Vickers
- Dean Jagger as Sam Quade
- Forrest Tucker as Sgt. O'Hara
- Harry Carey Jr. as Capt. Gregson
- Polly Bergen as Molly Quade
- James Millican as Gen. George Armstrong Custer
- Wallace Ford as Pvt. 'Irish' Potts
- Paul Fix as Pvt. Fiore
- Louis Jean Heydt as Herb Woodson
- Paul Lees as Cpl. Stockbridge
- Walter Sande as Sgt. Parker
- Charles Dayton as Lt. Nelson
- Robert Bray as Maj. Comstock (as Bob Bray)
- Douglas Spencer as Kelso
- James Burke as Oldtimer
- Chief Yowlachie as Chief
- John Mansfield as Sub-chief
- Monte Blue as First Emigrant
- Frank Ferguson as Marshal
- Cliff Clark as Bartender
- Paul E. Burns as Bum (as Paul Burns)
- Charles Stevenson as Curier
- John Hart as Sgt. Plennert

== Reception ==
In a contemporary review for The New York Times, critic Howard Thompson called the film "a reasonably digestible sample from the Holt feedbag" and wrote: "[I]t is chiefly Mr. O'Brien's portrayal of a hard-bitten, inherently decent cavalryman that gives 'Warpath' color and makes it seem better than it is—or was meant to be."

== See also ==
- List of American films of 1951
