= I'll Love You Always =

1935 film

- Directed by: Leo Bulgakov
- Written by: Lawrence Hazard; Vera Caspary; Sidney Buchman
- Produced by: Everett Riskin
- Starring: Nancy Carroll; George Murphy; Raymond Walburn
- Cinematography: Joseph H. August
- Edited by: Richard Cahoon
- Production company: Columbia Pictures
- Distributed by: Columbia Pictures
- Release date: March 20, 1935
- Running time: 75 minutes
- Country: United States
- Language: English

I'll Love You Always is a 1935 American drama film directed by Leo Bulgakov and starring Nancy Carroll, George Murphy and Raymond Walburn.

== Plot ==
An engineer, married to an actress, pretends he is working on a job in Russia when he has in fact been sent to prison for stealing money from his employer.

== Partial cast ==
- Nancy Carroll as Nora Clegg
- George Murphy as Carl Brent
- Raymond Walburn as Charlie
- Arthur Hohl as Jergens
- Jean Dixon as Mae Waters
- Robert Allen as Joe
- Harry Beresford as Mr. Clegg
- Paul Harvey as Sandstone
- Lucille Ball as Lucille
- Eadie Adams as Singer
- Claudia Coleman as Francine
- Gino Corrado as Waiter
- Adrian Morris as Pigface

== Bibliography ==
- Paul L. Nemcek. The films of Nancy Carroll. 1969.
