= Marla Shelton =

American actress

- Born: October 12, 1912; Eureka Springs, Arkansas
- Died: February 14, 2001 (aged 88); Laguna Niguel, California
- Occupation: Actress
- Spouses: Richard K. Polimer (m. 1934; div. 1936) Jack Dawn (m. 1937; div. 1943) N. Gayle Gitterman (m. 1955; died 1976)

Marla Shelton (October 12, 1912 – February 14, 2001) was an American actress. She appeared in the films The Phantom Rider, Flying Hostess, Under Cover of Night, Dangerous Number, When's Your Birthday?, Personal Property, Song of the City, There Goes My Girl, Walter Wanger's Vogues of 1938, Stand-In, 52nd Street, Escape to Paradise, The Lone Wolf Meets a Lady, Bells of Capistrano, Secrets of the Underground, When Johnny Comes Marching Home and Saratoga Trunk, among others.
