= Woman Trap (1936 film) =

1936 film by Harold Young

- Directed by: Harold Young
- Screenplay by: Brian Marlow; Eugene Walter
- Story by: Charles Brackett
- Produced by: Harold Hurley
- Starring: Gertrude Michael; George Murphy; Akim Tamiroff; Sidney Blackmer; Samuel S. Hinds; Dean Jagger
- Cinematography: William C. Mellor
- Edited by: Richard C. Currier
- Production company: Paramount Pictures
- Distributed by: Paramount Pictures
- Release date: March 6, 1936
- Running time: 63 minutes
- Country: United States
- Language: English

Woman Trap is a 1936 American drama film directed by Harold Young and written by Brian Marlow and Eugene Walter. The film stars Gertrude Michael, George Murphy, Akim Tamiroff, Sidney Blackmer, Samuel S. Hinds and Dean Jagger. The film was released on March 6, 1936, by Paramount Pictures.

== Cast ==
- Gertrude Michael as Barbara 'Buff' Andrews
- George Murphy as Keat Shevlin
- Akim Tamiroff as Joe Ramirez de la Valle
- Sidney Blackmer as Riley Ferguson
- Samuel S. Hinds as Senator Andrews
- Dean Jagger as 'Honey' Hogan
- Roscoe Karns as Mopsy
- Russell Hicks as Dodd
- David Haines as Jimmy Emerson
- Julian Rivero as Pancho
- Edward Brophy as George Meade
- Bradley Page as Harry Flint
- Ralph Malone as Fred Brace
- Arthur Aylesworth as City Editor Bert
- Hayden Stevenson as Sheriff
- John Martin as Boy Radio Operator
