= Dean Jagger =

American actor (1903–1991)

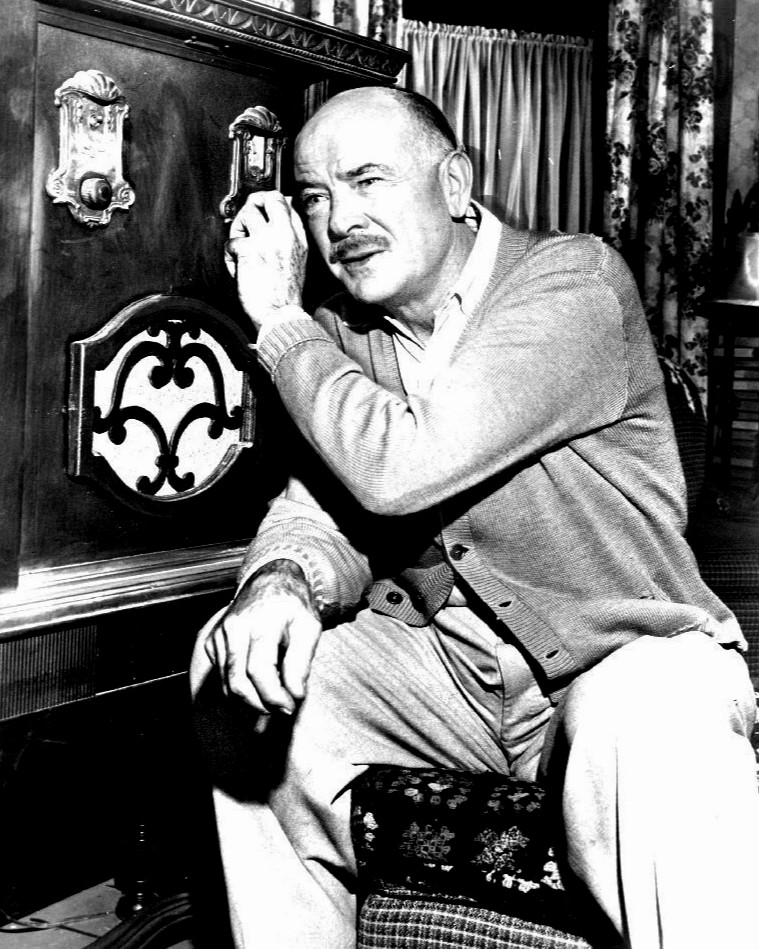
- Jagger in The Twilight Zone (1961)
- Born: Dean Jeffries Jagger or Dean Ida Jagger; November 7, 1903; Columbus Grove or Lima, Ohio, U.S.
- Died: February 5, 1991 (aged 87); Santa Monica, California, U.S.
- Resting place: Lakewood Memorial Park, Hughson, California
- Occupation: Actor
- Years active: 1923–1987
- Spouses: Antoinette Lowrance (m. 1935; div. 1943) Gloria Ling (m. 1947; div. 1967) (died 2010) Etta Mae Norton (m. 1968) (died 1992)
- Children: 3

Dean Jagger (November 7, 1903 – February 5, 1991) was an American actor of film, stage, and television. He was known as one of the most "dependable character actors" of the Golden Age of Hollywood, though he also played leading roles. He won an Academy Award for Best Supporting Actor for his performance in Twelve O'Clock High (1949), and was nominated for two Primetime Emmy Awards for his work on the television series Mr. Novak (1963–65).

== Early life ==
Dean Jeffries Jagger (or Dean Ida Jagger) was born in Columbus Grove or Lima, Ohio. Growing up on a farm, he wanted to act, and practiced oratory on cattle while working. He later won several oratory competitions. At age 14, he worked as an orderly at a sanatorium.

He dropped out of school several times before finally attending Wabash College. While there, he was a member of Lambda Chi Alpha fraternity and played football. He dropped out in his second year, realizing he was not suited to an academic life.

At age 17, he taught all eight grades in a rural elementary school, before heading to Chicago. He studied at the Conservatory of Drama with Elias Day, and through him got a job on the Chautauqua circuit.

== Career ==
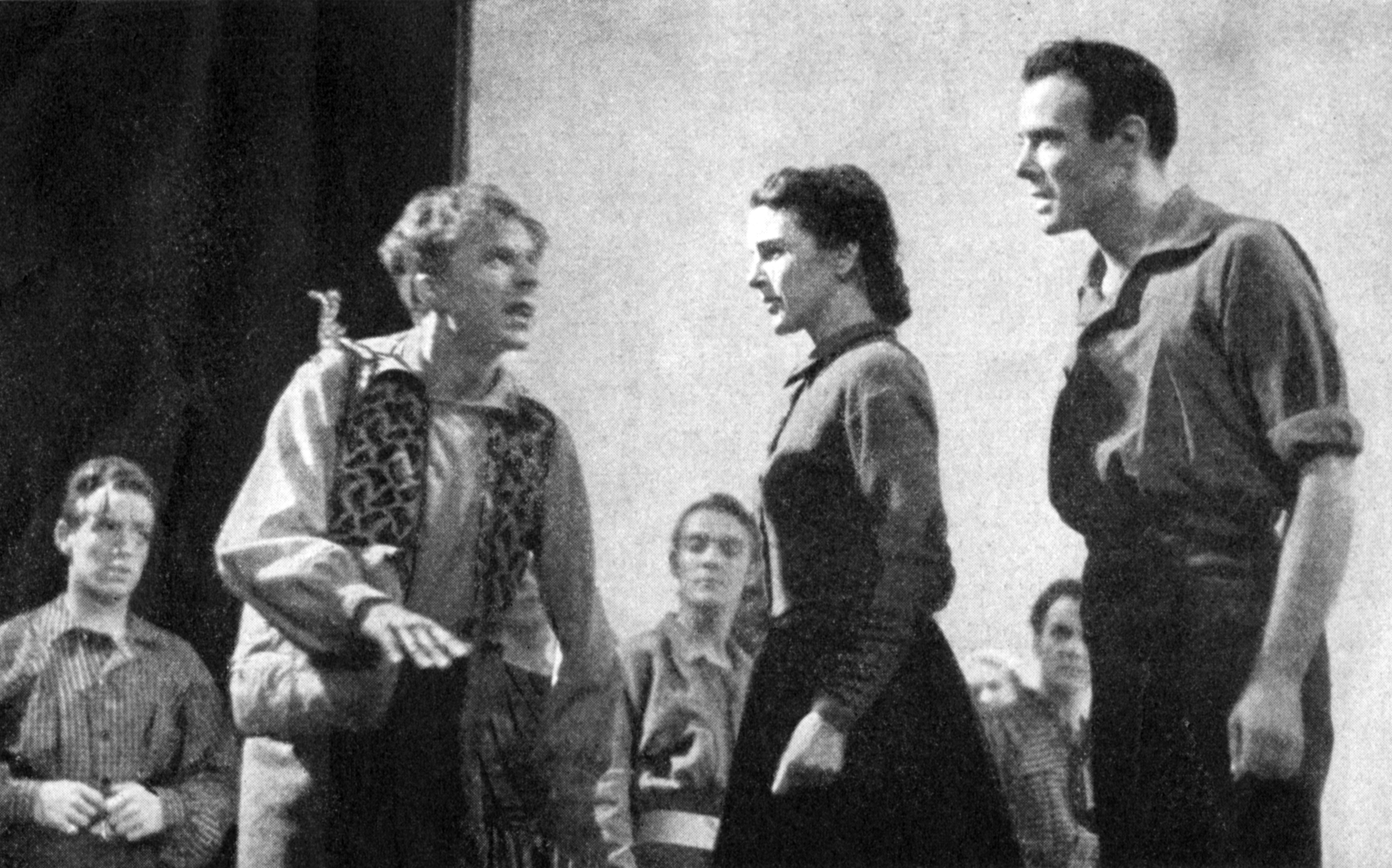
Left to right: Norman Lloyd, Katherine Emery, and Dean Jagger in the Broadway production of Everywhere I Roam (1938)

=== Early stage appearances ===
Jagger studied acting at Chicago's Lyceum Arts Conservatory. He eventually played Young Matt in a production of Shepherd of the Hills on stage in Chicago. This experience resulted in his deciding to try his luck in New York City.

He joined a stock company as Spencer Tracy's replacement. He performed in vaudeville, on the radio, and on stage, making his Broadway debut in 1925 in a bit part in a George M. Cohan production. He was in the play Remote Control in 1928.

=== Early films ===
Jagger visited Los Angeles on a vaudeville show with Irene Rich. While there, he made his film debut in The Woman from Hell (1929) with Mary Astor. "My good notices", he later recalled, "had a reverse effect on the industry, which was suddenly revolutionized by sound pictures. With the one film to my credit, I was considered part of that group of untouchables – silent film stars." He followed it with Handcuffed (1929).

Jagger decided to move into film production, helping raise money to make a feature that ultimately never was released. He returned to New York City.

=== Tobacco Road ===
Jagger's big career break came when cast in a lead role in the play Tobacco Road in 1933. The play was a huge hit and ran until 1941, though Jagger left the show in 1934 to appear in They Shall Not Die, which only ran 62 performances.

=== Hollywood ===
In April 1934, Jagger signed a contract with Paramount, for which he made You Belong to Me (1934) with Lee Tracy, then College Rhythm (1934) with Jack Oakie, Behold My Wife! (1934) with Sylvia Sidney, Wings in the Dark (1935) with Myrna Loy and Cary Grant, Home on the Range (1935) with Jackie Coogan, Randolph Scott and Evelyn Brent, Car 99 (1935) with Fred MacMurray and Ann Sheridan, People Will Talk (1935) with Charlie Ruggles, and Men Without Names (1935) with Fred MacMurray. Paramount gave him a lead role in the B Western Wanderer of the Wasteland (1935). He was back in supporting parts in It's a Great Life (1935), Woman Trap (1936), and 13 Hours by Air (1936).

Victor Halperin borrowed him to play the lead role in Revolt of the Zombies (1936). He went to 20th Century Fox for Pepper (1936) and Star for a Night (1936), then to MGM for Under Cover of Night (1937).

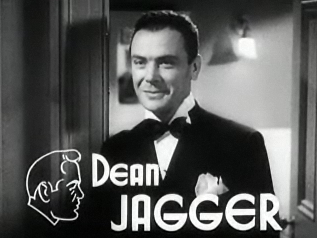
Trailer for Dangerous Number (1937)

Jagger did Woman in Distress (1937) at Columbia, and Dangerous Number (1937) and Song of the City (1937) at MGM.

Jagger appeared in Republic Pictures' Escape by Night (1937) and Exiled to Shanghai (1937).

Jagger played Michael Drops In in summer stock and returned to Broadway to star in Missouri Legend (1938), which ran 48 performances. He was also in short runs for Everywhere I Roam (1938–39), Brown Danube (1939), Farm of Three Echoes (1939–40) with Ethel Barrymore, and Unconquered (1940) by Ayn Rand.

=== Brigham Young ===
Jagger made his breakthrough with his portrayal of Mormon leader Brigham Young in Brigham Young (1940) at 20th Century Fox, alongside Tyrone Power for director Henry Hathaway. He was cast on the basis of his performance in Missouri Legend. According to George D. Pyper, a technical consultant on the film who had personally known Brigham Young, Jagger not only resembled Young, but he also spoke like him and shared some of his mannerisms. Some 32 years later in 1972, he was baptized a member of the Church of Jesus Christ of Latter-day Saints.

Fox signed him to a long-term contract and put him in Western Union (1941) for Fritz Lang. He was announced for the Biblical film The Great Commandment and a biopic of Lewis and Clark with Randolph Scott, but neither was made.

Instead, Jagger appeared in The Men in Her Life (1941) for Columbia, Valley of the Sun (1942) at RKO, and The Omaha Trail (1942) at MGM.

=== King Brothers ===
Jagger had a rare lead role in I Escaped from the Gestapo (1943) for the King Brothers, then went back to supporting roles for The North Star (1943) for Sam Goldwyn. The King Brothers gave him top billing again with When Strangers Marry (1944). Jagger acted in Alaska (1944) at Monogram, which was distributed to King films.

Jagger went to England to appear in I Live in Grosvenor Square (1945) with Anna Neagle and Rex Harrison. He had good roles in Sister Kenny (1946) with Rosalind Russell and Pursued (1947) with Robert Mitchum.

He did Driftwood (1947) for Republic and started appearing on TV shows such as The Philco-Goodyear Television Playhouse, Studio One, and The Chevrolet Tele-Theatre.

Jagger returned to Broadway for Dr. Social (1948), but it had a short run. He had the lead role in 'C'-Man (1949).

=== Twelve O'Clock High and 1950s ===
Jagger received an Academy Award for Best Supporting Actor for his role in Twelve O'Clock High (1949), made at Fox and directed by Henry King. In the film, he played the World War I veteran, middle-aged adjutant Major/Lt. Col. Harvey Stovall, who acts as an advisor to the commander, General Savage (Gregory Peck).

Jagger stayed a supporting actor, though, appearing in Sierra (1950) with Audie Murphy at Universal, Dark City (1950) for Hal Wallis, Rawhide (1951) with Hathaway and Power at Fox, and Warpath (1951) at Paramount with Edmond O'Brien and directed by Byron Haskin.

Jagger had a lead role in the strongly anticommunist film My Son John (1952) at Paramount. He was in Denver and Rio Grande (1952), again with Haskin and O'Brien, and episodes of Gulf Playhouse, Lux Video Theatre, Cavalcade of America, Schlitz Playhouse, and Studio 57.

He appeared in the biblical epic The Robe (1953), as the weaver Justus of Cana, and was in Private Hell 36 (1954).

He played retired Army Major General Tom Waverly honored by Bob Wallace (Bing Crosby) and Phil Davis (Danny Kaye) in the musical White Christmas (1954) and a meek, alcoholic sheriff in the modern Western Bad Day at Black Rock (1955), starring Spencer Tracy for MGM. He was also in The Eternal Sea (1955) at Republic, It's a Dog's Life (1955) at MGM, On the Threshold of Space (1956) at Fox, and Red Sundown (1956) at Universal.

For the 1956 British science-fiction film X the Unknown, Jagger refused to work with director Joseph Losey because Losey was on the Hollywood blacklist. Losey came off the project after a few days of shooting and was replaced by Leslie Norman. An alternative version is that Losey was replaced due to illness. Half the budget, $30,000, went to Jagger's fee.

Jagger was in The 20th Century Fox Hour, Three Brave Men (1956), The Great Man (1956) (second-billed to José Ferrer), Zane Grey Theatre, "Bernadine" (1957) with Pat Boone, an episode of Playhouse 90, Forty Guns (1957) for Sam Fuller, and The Proud Rebel (1958) with Alan Ladd and directed by Michael Curtiz.

Jagger also portrayed the father of Elvis Presley's character in 1958's King Creole, directed by Curtiz.

Jagger was in The Nun's Story (1959), playing the father of Audrey Hepburn's character, and Cash McCall (1960), and played the traveling manager for an evangelist played by Jean Simmons in the acclaimed 1960 drama Elmer Gantry. He was in two failed pilots, including The House on K Street.

In the 1960s, Jagger increasingly worked on television, appearing in The Twilight Zone ("Static"), NBC Sunday Showcase, Our American Heritage, General Electric Theater, Dr. Kildare, The Christophers, The Alfred Hitchcock Hour, and The Partridge Family. He also appeared in the films Parrish (1961), The Honeymoon Machine (1961), and Billy Rose's Jumbo (1962).

=== Mr. Novak ===
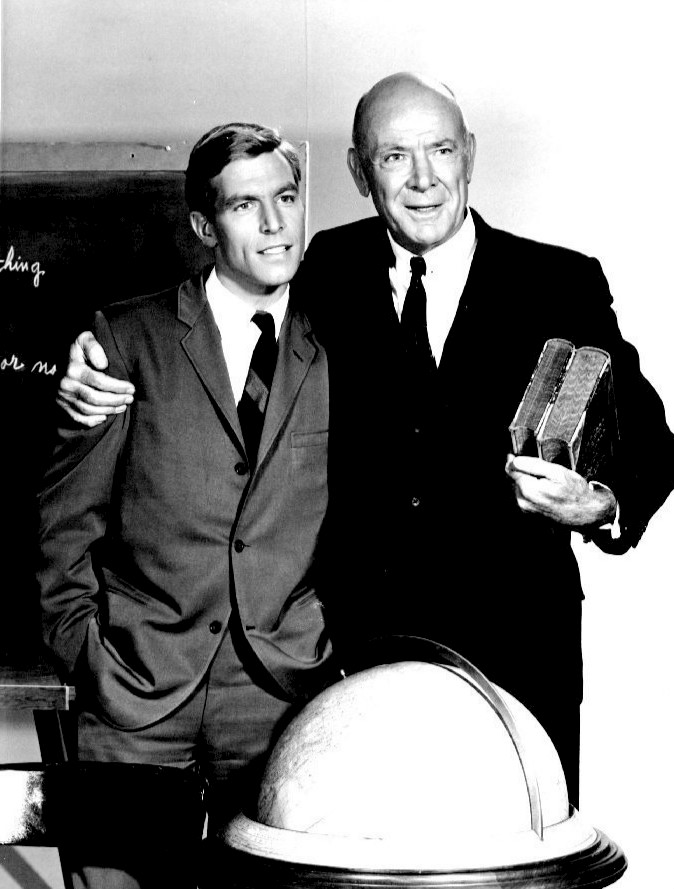
James Franciscus and Jagger from the television series Mr. Novak

Jagger achieved success with the television series Mr. Novak (1963–1965), receiving Emmy Award nominations for his role in 1964 and 1965, as well as the California Teachers Association's Communications Award, along with star James Franciscus, in 1963 for his portrayal of high-school principal Albert Vane. Before he left the show to have a major medical operation, though, he was less than happy with the series, clashing repeatedly with the writers and directors and describing "the Mr. Novak company" afterwards as "a mishmash of unbelievable amateurishness." "It is unforgivable how bad TV is today", he said in 1965. "The people doing it have succumbed to the cliché that there is no time to be good in TV, or that we doing it are lucky to get one good episode out of three. Why?" Jagger officially left the show in December 1964 because of an ulcer.

Jagger's appearances in the 1960s included episodes of The F.B.I. and The Fugitive, as well as films First to Fight (1967), Firecreek (1968), Day of the Evil Gun (1968), Smith! (1968) with Glenn Ford, The Lonely Profession (1969), Tiger by the Tail (1970), The Kremlin Letter (1970), Men at Law, The Brotherhood of the Bell (1970), again with Ford, and an episode of The Name of the Game.

He had a semiregular role on the series Matt Lincoln (1970), as the father of the title character, and parts in Vanishing Point (1971), Bonanza, and Incident in San Francisco (1971).

In 1971, Jagger appeared on The Partridge Family. He played a prospector named Charlie in the Christmas episode, "Don't Bring Your Guns to Town, Santa".

=== Later career ===
Jagger was in The Glass House (1972), Columbo, Kung Fu (Jagger appeared as Caine's grandfather, who wants little to do with him, but starts Caine on his series-long search for his half-brother Danny), Alias Smith and Jones, Medical Center, The Stranger (1973), The Delphi Bureau, The Lie (1973), Shaft, I Heard the Owl Call My Name (1973), Love Story, The Hanged Man (1974), The Great Lester Boggs (1974), So Sad About Gloria (1975), The Lindbergh Kidnapping Case (1976), Harry O, Hunter, End of the World (1977), and Evil Town (1977).

He played the syndicate boss in Game of Death (1978) as the nemesis of Bruce Lee.

Jagger's later appearances included The Waltons, Gideon's Trumpet (1980), and Alligator (1980).

He won a Daytime Emmy award for a guest appearance in the religious series This Is the Life.

His last role was as Dr. David Domedion in the St. Elsewhere season-three finale "Cheers" in 1985.

== Honors ==
Dean Jagger has a star on the Hollywood Walk of Fame at 1523 Vine Street for his contribution to motion pictures.

== Personal life ==
When Jagger tried to marry his second wife, Gloria Ling, in 1947, they were denied a marriage license in California due to a state law "forbidding unions between Caucasians and Mongolians [sic]"; Ling's father had been born in China. Within two days, the couple had flown to Albuquerque, New Mexico, and were married under "New Mexico's more liberal statute."

A staunch Republican, Jagger supported Joseph McCarthy's anti-communist investigations. In 1956, he refused to work with blacklisted director Joseph Losey on the film X the Unknown, forcing the studio to replace him.

=== Death ===
In later life, Jagger suffered from heart disease. He died in his sleep in Santa Monica, California. He was 87. He was survived by his third wife, Etta, a daughter, and two stepsons.

== Filmography ==
- The Woman from Hell (1929) as Jim Coakley
- Handcuffed (1929) as Gerald Morely
- Whoopee! (1930) as Deputy (uncredited)
- You Belong to Me (1934) as Military School Instructor
- College Rhythm (1934) as Coach Robbins
- Behold My Wife! (1934) as Pete
- Home on the Range (1935) as Thurman
- Wings in the Dark (1935) as Top Harmon
- Car 99 (1935) as Trooper Jim Burton
- People Will Talk (1935) as Bill Trask
- Men Without Names (1935) as Jones
- Wanderer of the Wasteland (1935) as Adam Larey
- It's a Great Life (1935) as Arnold
- Woman Trap (1936) as 'Honey' Hogan
- Thirteen Hours by Air (1936) as Hap Waller
- Revolt of the Zombies (1936) as Armand Louque
- Pepper (1936) as Bob O'Ryan
- Star for a Night (1936) as Fritz Lind
- Under Cover of Night (1937) as Alan Shaw
- Woman in Distress (1937) as Fred Stevens
- Dangerous Number (1937) as Vance Dillman
- Song of the City (1937) as Paul Herrick
- Escape by Night (1937) as James 'Capper' Regan
- Exiled to Shanghai (1937) as Charlie Sears
- Having Wonderful Time (1938) as Charlie – Emma's Husband (uncredited)
- Brigham Young (1940) as Brigham Young
- Western Union (1941) as Edward Creighton
- The Men in Her Life (1941) as David Gibson
- Valley of the Sun (1942) as Jim Sawyer
- The Omaha Trail (1942) as 'Pipestone' Ross
- I Escaped from the Gestapo (1943) as Torgut Lane
- The North Star (1943) as Rodion Pavlov
- When Strangers Marry (1944) as Paul Baxter
- Alaska (1944) as U.S. Marshal John Masters
- I Live in Grosvenor Square (1945) (US title: A Yank in London) as Sergeant John Patterson
- Sister Kenny (1946) as Kevin Connors
- Pursued (1947) as Grant Callum
- Driftwood (1947) as Dr. Steve Webster
- C-Man (1949) as Cliff Holden – alias William Harrah
- Twelve O'Clock High (1949) as Major Stovall
- Sierra (1950) as Jeff Hassard
- Dark City (1950) as Captain Garvey
- Rawhide (1951) as Yancy
- Warpath (1951) as Sam Quade
- My Son John (1952) as Dan Jefferson
- Denver and Rio Grande (1952) as General William J. Palmer
- It Grows on Trees (1952) as Phil Baxter
- The Robe (1953) as Justus
- Executive Suite (1954) as Jesse Q. Grimm
- Private Hell 36 (1954) as Captain Michaels
- White Christmas (1954) as Major General Thomas F. Waverly
- Bad Day at Black Rock (1955) as Tim Horn
- The Eternal Sea (1955) as Vice-Admiral Thomas L. Semple
- It's a Dog's Life (1955) as Mr. Wyndham
- Red Sundown (1956) as Sheriff Jade Murphy
- On the Threshold of Space (1956) as Dr. Hugo Thornton
- X the Unknown (1956) as Dr. Adam Royston
- Three Brave Men (1956) as John W. Rogers – Secretary of the Navy
- The Great Man (1956) as Philip Carleton
- Bernardine (1957) as J. Fullerton Weldy
- Forty Guns (1957) as Sheriff Ned Logan
- The Proud Rebel (1958) as Harry Burleigh
- King Creole (1958) as Mr. Fisher
- The Nun's Story (1959) as Dr. Van Der Mal
- The House on K-Street (1959 TV movie) as Dr. Morgan Jarrett
- Cash McCall (1960) as Grant Austen
- Elmer Gantry (1960) as William L. Morgan
- Jarrett of K Street (1960 TV movie) as Dr. Morgan Jarrett
- Static (The Twilight Zone) (1961) as Ed Lindsay
- Parrish (1961) as Sala Post
- The Honeymoon Machine (1961) as Admiral Fitch
- Billy Rose's Jumbo (1962) as John Noble
- The Alfred Hitchcock Hour (1963) (Season 1 Episode 24: "The Star Juror") as George Davies
- The Fugitive "Right In The Middle Of The Season" (1966) as Tony Donovan
- First to Fight (1967) as Lieutenant Colonel E.J. Baseman
- Firecreek (1968) as Whittier
- Day of the Evil Gun (1968) as Jimmy Noble
- Smith! (1969) as Judge James C. Brown
- The Lonely Profession (1969 TV movie) as Charles Van Cleve
- Tiger by the Tail (1970) as Top Polk
- The Kremlin Letter (1970) as Highwayman
- The Brotherhood of the Bell (1970 TV movie) as Chad Harmon
- Vanishing Point (1971) as Prospector
- Incident in San Francisco (1971 TV movie) as Sam Baldwin
- The Glass House (1972 TV movie) as Warden Auerbach
- The Stranger (1973 TV movie) as Carl Webster
- The Lie (1973 TV movie) as Arnold Edgarton
- So Sad About Gloria (1973) as Frederick Wellman
- I Heard the Owl Call My Name (1973 TV movie) as Bishop
- The Hanged Man (1974 TV movie) as Josiah Lowe
- The Great Lester Boggs (1974) as Grandfather Vandiver
- The Lindbergh Kidnapping Case (1976 TV movie) as Koehler
- Evil Town (1977) as Doctor Schaeffer
- End of the World (1977) as Ray Collins
- Game of Death (1978) as Dr. Land
- Gideon's Trumpet (1980 TV movie) as Sixth Supreme Court Justice
- Alligator (1980) as Slade

== Awards and nominations ==
Institution	Year	Category	Work	Result	Ref.
Academy Awards	1950	Best Supporting Actor	Twelve O'Clock High	Won	
Daytime Emmy Awards	1980	Outstanding Individual Achievement in Religious Programming	This Is the Life ("Independence & 76")	Won	
Primetime Emmy Awards	1964	Outstanding Lead Actor in a Drama Series	Mr. Novak	Nominated	
Primetime Emmy Awards	1965	Outstanding Individual Achievements in Entertainment - Actors and Performers	Mr. Novak	Nominated	
Venice Film Festival	1954	Grand Jury Prize (for Ensemble Acting)	Executive Suite	Won	
