= The 13th Man =

1937 film by William Nigh

- Directed by: William Nigh
- Written by: John W. Krafft
- Produced by: Trem Carr (executive producer) Lon Young (associate producer)
- Starring: Weldon Heyburn; Inez Courtney; Selmer Jackson; Matty Fain; Milburn Stone; Grace Durkin; Robert Homans; Eadie Adams; Sidney Payne
- Cinematography: Paul Ivano
- Edited by: Russell F. Schoengarth
- Music by: Abe Meyer
- Production company: Monogram Pictures
- Distributed by: Monogram Pictures
- Release date: June 30, 1937
- Running time: 70 minutes
- Country: United States
- Language: English

The 13th Man, also known as The Thirteenth Man, is a 1937 American mystery film directed by William Nigh and starring Weldon Heyburn, Inez Courtney and Selmer Jackson. It was the first film released by the relaunched Monogram Pictures after the studio withdrew from a merger with Republic Pictures.

== Plot ==
Swifty Taylor, a journalist with the Globe Times, hunts for the underworld figure responsible for the killing of a crusading district attorney, murdered by curare-laced dart while attending a prizefight, and of a reporter who had got too close to the truth. Meanwhile, Taylor's secretary, Julie, hopes to persuade him to settle down and marry her.

== Cast ==
- Weldon Heyburn as A. "Swifty" Taylor
- Inez Courtney as Julie Walters (Swifty's secretary)
- Selmer Jackson as Andrew Baldwin (Globe Times publisher)
- Matty Fain as Louis Cristy (nightclub owner)
- Milburn Stone as Jimmy Moran (Globe Times reporter)
- Grace Durkin as Alice Moran (Baldwin's secretary)
- Robert Homans as Police Lt. Tom O'Hara
- Eadie Adams as Stella Leroy (nightclub singer)
- Sidney Payne as "Legs" Henderson (fighter)
- Dewey Robinson as Romeo Casanova (radio singer / gym operator)
- William Gould as Dist. Atty. Robert E. Sutherland
- Warner Richmond as George Crandall the Bookie
- Eddie Gribbon as Iron Man' (Swiftys bodyguard)

== Soundtrack ==
- Eadie Adams - "My Topic of Conversation" (Written by Joseph Myro and Milton Royce)
