= Flying Hostess =

1936 American drama film

- Directed by: Murray Roth
- Written by: Harry Clork; Harvey Gates; Brown Holmes; George Wallace Sayre
- Produced by: Edmund Grainger; Charles R. Rogers
- Starring: William Gargan; Judith Barrett; William Hall
- Cinematography: James Van Trees
- Music by: Charles Previn
- Production company: Universal Pictures
- Distributed by: Universal Pictures
- Release date: December 1, 1936
- Running time: 66 minutes
- Country: United States
- Language: English

Flying Hostess is a 1936 American drama film directed by Murray Roth and starring William Gargan, Judith Barrett and William Hall.

== Plot ==
A group of stewardesses undergo their intensive airline training. Later, their skills and bravery are put to the ultimate test when they must work together to thwart the hijacking of a commercial airplane.

== Cast ==
- William Gargan as Hal Cunningham
- Judith Barrett as Helen Brooks
- William Hall as Guy Edwards
- Astrid Allwyn as Phyllis Crawford
- Ella Logan as Edna Mulcahy
- Andy Devine as Joe Williams
- Addison Randall as Earl Spencer
- Marla Shelton as Marion Beatty
- Michael Loring as Pilot
- Mary Alice Rice as Miss Davies
- Richard Tucker as Doctor
- Jonathan Hale as Kendall
- Al Hill as 'Knuckles' Boland
- Kenneth Harlan as 1st Detective
- Pat Flaherty as 2nd Detective
- George Chandler as Florist

== Bibliography ==
- Paris, Michael. From the Wright Brothers to Top Gun: Aviation, Nationalism, and Popular Cinema. Manchester University Press, 1995.
