= Trapped by Television =

1936 film by Del Lord

- Poster
- Directed by: Del Lord
- Screenplay by: Lee Loeb; Harold Buchman
- Story by: Sherman L. Lowe (as Sherman Lowe); Al Martin
- Produced by: Ben Pivar (associate producer)
- Starring: Mary Astor; Lyle Talbot; Nat Pendleton
- Cinematography: Allen G. Siegler
- Edited by: James Sweeney
- Color process: Black and white
- Production company: Columbia Pictures
- Distributed by: Columbia Pictures
- Release date: June 15, 1936
- Running time: 64 minutes
- Country: United States
- Language: English

Trapped by Television is a 1936 American comedy-drama crime science fiction film directed by Del Lord and starring Mary Astor, Lyle Talbot and Nat Pendleton. The film is also known as Caught by Television in the United Kingdom.

== Plot ==
An inventor is working on his latest creation, a new form of television monitor and camera, but is struggling to complete his invention due to lack of funds. His monetary problems are compounded by an aggressive bill collector looking for payments, and competition from a rival scientist. When organized crime figures are added to the mix, the desperation level rises for our intrepid inventor.

== Cast ==
- Mary Astor as Barbara "Bobby" Blake
- Lyle Talbot as Fred Dennis
- Nat Pendleton as Rocky O'Neil
- Joyce Compton as Mae Collins
- Thurston Hall as John Curtis
- Henry Mollison as Thornton
- Wyrley Birch as Paul Turner
- Robert Strange as Standish

== Accuracy ==
Although televisions were being made from the late 1920s, they were not commercially available until after 1936. The all-electronic model shown in the movie was designed for the production using a back-lit projection of a moving image onto the screen.

The screen was notable for its large size when actual television screens of the period were smaller. A simple prop cathode-ray tube is shown as circular and discussed by the cast as an essential but expensive component, which is mentioned to cost $146 in 1936 dollars.

For the "demonstration" sequence, the inventors choose to set their camera up in a stadium to broadcast a football game, with accompanying commentary, thus anticipating one of the most lucrative uses of sports television.

The BBC's regular television Broadcasting Service began in November 1936, four months after this movie's release.

The director, Del Lord, also featured a similar large screen set in the Niagara Falls scene of his 1940s Three Stooges short A Plumbing We Will Go.

== Current condition ==
Although the first reel is noticeably faded on most surviving prints, the film is now in the public domain and is available for general download.

== See also ==
- List of American films of 1936
- List of films in the public domain in the United States
