= William Hall (actor, born 1903) =

American actor (1903–1986)

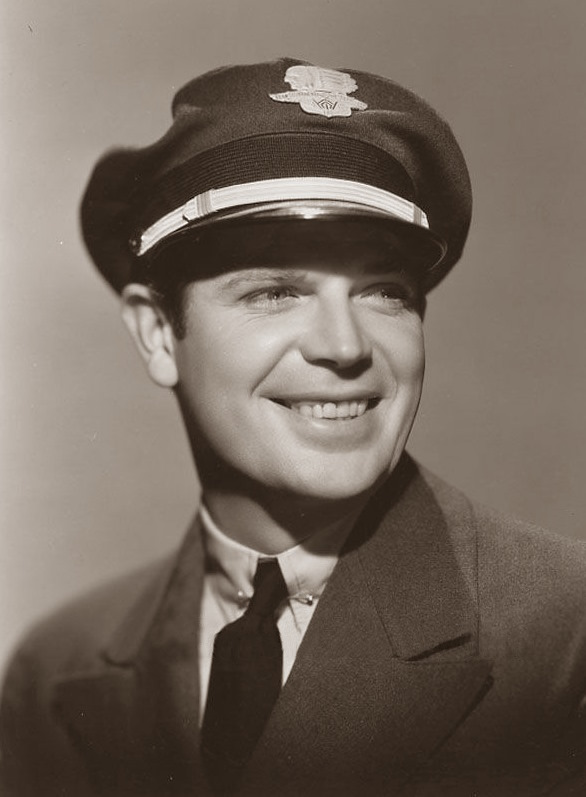
- Publicity photo of Hall taken around 1937
- Born: William Vincent Langan; March 3, 1903; Brooklyn, New York, U.S.
- Died: September 14, 1986 (aged 83); Kerrville, Texas, U.S.
- Resting place: Fort Sam Houston National Cemetery, San Antonio, Texas
- Occupations: Actor, Talent Agent
- Years active: 1921–1956
- Height: 6 ft 5 in (1.96 m)
- Spouse: Cathleen "Kitty" O'Connor
- Children: 1 son, 1 daughter

William Hall (born William Vincent Langan; March 1903 – September 1986) was an American actor of Irish-English descent. He enlisted in the United States Army at the age of 14 and served in France during World War I. After being injured, he recovered in Italy where he began studying voice and performed with an Italian theater group. Hall later pursued higher education at Georgetown University and initially aspired to become a diplomat.

Hall's career in show business began when he was discovered by Samuel "Roxy" Rothafel while working as a theater employee. He gained fame for his performances at the theater and made his break in the early 1920s. He appeared in various musical shows and studied voice in Milan, Italy. By the late 1930s, he had made numerous radio appearances and began his Hollywood career with Universal Pictures in 1936, where he earned praise for his role in The Magnificent Brute.

After retiring from acting in 1956, Hall established a talent agency in Phoenix, Arizona, which represented around 150 actors and actresses. In his personal life, he was married to Cathleen "Kitty" O'Connor and had two children. Hall died in September 1986 at the age of 83 and was buried with full military honors in Fort Sam Houston National Cemetery. He was survived by his wife, children, and grandchildren.

== Early life ==
Hall was born William Vincent Langan on March 3, 1903 in Brooklyn, New York and was of Irish-English descent. According to birth records, his mother was Mary Langan (née McGuire) and his father was Joseph Langan, a retired New York police inspector who was also regarded as having a singing voice. He received his high school education in New York.

At the age of 14, Hall enlisted to the United States Army, helped by his height exceeding 6 foot (1.8 m). He served during World War I with the American Expeditionary Forces in France, where he sustained severe injuries and was subsequently treated in Italy. His injuries led to the removal of a portion of his lung and the insertion of a plate in his head. He also suffered from shell shock. While recuperating in Italy, Hall discovered his passion for singing and embarked on a tour with an Italian theater group after his discharge. His military service spanned from February 1918 to July 1920.

Upon returning to the United States, Hall pursued higher education at Georgetown University's School of Foreign Service, with aspirations of becoming a diplomat. Hall had desired from a young age to become a diplomat, despite friends suggesting that he should pursue a career in theater. During his time at Georgetown, he showcased his vocal talents at embassy parties, earning him a modest income. As part of an effort to become financially independent, Hall limited himself to eating mostly only cinnamon buns.

== Career ==
Hall's talent was noticed by Samuel "Roxy" Rothafel, a theater impresario, who discovered him while Hall was working as a theatre employee, then singing to amuse his friends. He would later go on to hold the record as having appeared at the theater more than any other celebrity. His first break in showbusiness came around the early 1920s as an undergraduate student at Georgetown University, where he starred in a musical show at Old Poli's after the original singer withdrew due to excessive alcohol consumption. Other parts followed afterwards, including in The Passing Show and Take the Air. Hall honed his talent by studying voice in Milan, Italy, alongside renowned artists such as Vernon D'Arnalle and Guiseppi Comanari, with the former remarking that he had a "great operatic voice".

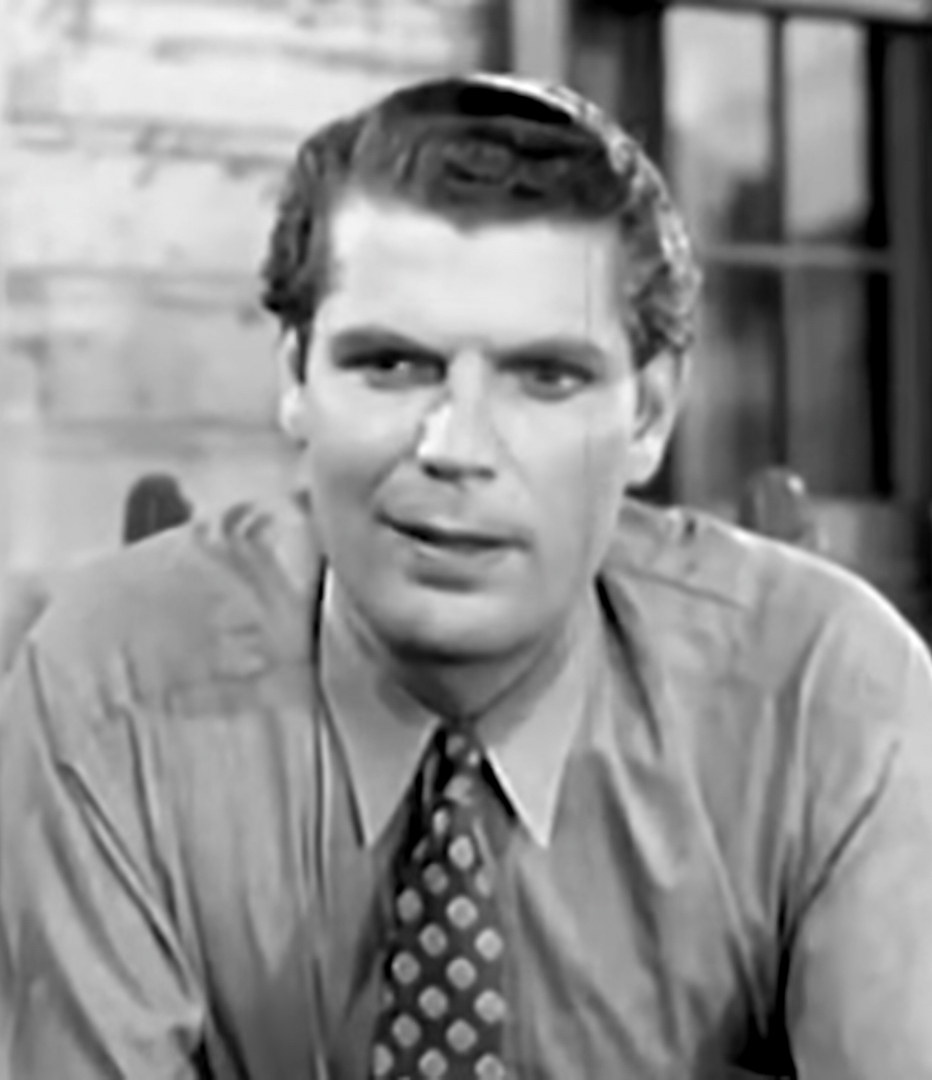
Hall in Escape by Night (1937)

By early 1929, he had performed military parts on stage on 14 separate occasions, joking that the stage had given him more military experience than his time spent fighting during the war. His first involvement with motion picture was reported as being in The Wrongdoers, starring Lionel Barrymore. He was described in 1930 as having a "splended baritone voice" by the Spokane Chronicle. By the late 1930s, he had appeared on national radio over one hundred times which facilitated a national personal appearance tour in 1935.

While dining with friends at the Trocadero cafe, Hall was spotted by the newly appointed head of Universal Studios, Charles R. Rogers, after he got up to sing. Rogers was looking for someone to play supporting lead to Victor McLaglen in the 1936 film The Magnificent Brute and offered Hall the role, ultimately earning him an Academy Award nomination. Universal saw great potential in Hall, comparing him favorably to Clark Gable, believing they possessed the same qualities as a "man's man" and appealing to women. He played various supporting roles until 1939 when he transitioned into leading roles.

=== Retirement from acting ===
Hall retired from acting around 1956 to establish a talent agency in Phoenix, Arizona. By 1964, he had a roster of around 150 actors and actresses, although remarked that he struggled to find younger talent. Almost all of the actors who featured in the film Blood on the Arrow were provided by his talent agency. His involvement in the industry concluded with his final work being on the production team for the television series Death Valley Days, which starred future president Ronald Reagan.

== Personal life ==
Outside of acting, he enjoyed boxing, tennis and swimming. His strength in boxing often made it challenging for him to find suitable sparring partners. Hall was married to recording artist and baritone Cathleen "Kitty" O'Connor and they had a daughter Mary (born c. 1930) and a son William Jr (born c. 1935).

He died in September 1986 aged 83 in a local hospital and was buried in Fort Sam Houston National Cemetery with full military honors. He was survived by his wife, two children and three grandsons.

== Filmography ==
Film credits (partial):

=== Film ===
- Swing High (1930)
- Rambling 'Round Radio Row (1932)
- Postal Inspector (1936)
- The Magnificent Brute (1936)
- Flying Hostess (1936)
- Oh, Doctor (1937)
- Windjammer (1937)
- Escape by Night (1937)
- The Spy Ring (1938)
- Captain Fury (1939)
- In Old Monterey (1939)
- The Amazing Mr. Williams (1939)
- Hold That Woman! (1940)
- Junior G-Men (1940)
- Life with Henry (1941)
- The Green Hornet Strikes Again! (1941)
- Buck Privates (1941)
- Las Vegas Nights (1941)
- Man-Made Monster (1941)
- Power Dive (1941)
- Riders of Death Valley (1941)
- Flying Blind (1941)
- The Bachelor and the Bobby-Soxer (1947)
