= The Spy Ring =

1938 film by Joseph H. Lewis

- Theatrical release poster
- Directed by: Joseph H. Lewis
- Screenplay by: George Waggner
- Based on: The Enemy's Goal by Frank Van Wyck Mason
- Produced by: Trem Carr
- Starring: William Hall; Jane Wyman; Esther Ralston; Robert Warwick; Leon Ames; Ben Alexander
- Cinematography: Harry Neumann
- Edited by: Charles Craft
- Production company: Universal Pictures
- Distributed by: Universal Pictures
- Release date: January 8, 1938
- Running time: 61 minutes
- Country: United States
- Language: English

The Spy Ring is a 1938 American adventure film directed by Joseph H. Lewis and written by George Waggner. The film stars William Hall, Jane Wyman, Esther Ralston, Robert Warwick, Leon Ames and Ben Alexander. The film was released on January 8, 1938, by Universal Pictures.

== Plot ==
Two army officers are working on an invention that will guarantee accuracy on artillery and large weapons, but there is a gang of spies that is after the device, when one of the officers is murdered, the other one swears to catch the spies that did it.

== Cast ==
- William Hall as Capt. Todd Hayden
- Jane Wyman as Elaine Burdette
- Esther Ralston as Jean Bruce
- Robert Warwick as Col. Burdette
- Leon Ames as Frank Denton
- Ben Alexander as Capt. Don Mayhew
- Don Barclay as Private Timothy O'Reilly
- Egon Brecher as General A. R. Bowen
- Paul Sutton as Charley
- Jack Mulhall as Capt. Tex Randolph
- LeRoy Mason as Paul Douglas
- Harry Woods as Capt. Holden
- Phillip Trent as Capt. Robert Scott
