= Edmund J. Pendleton =

American composer

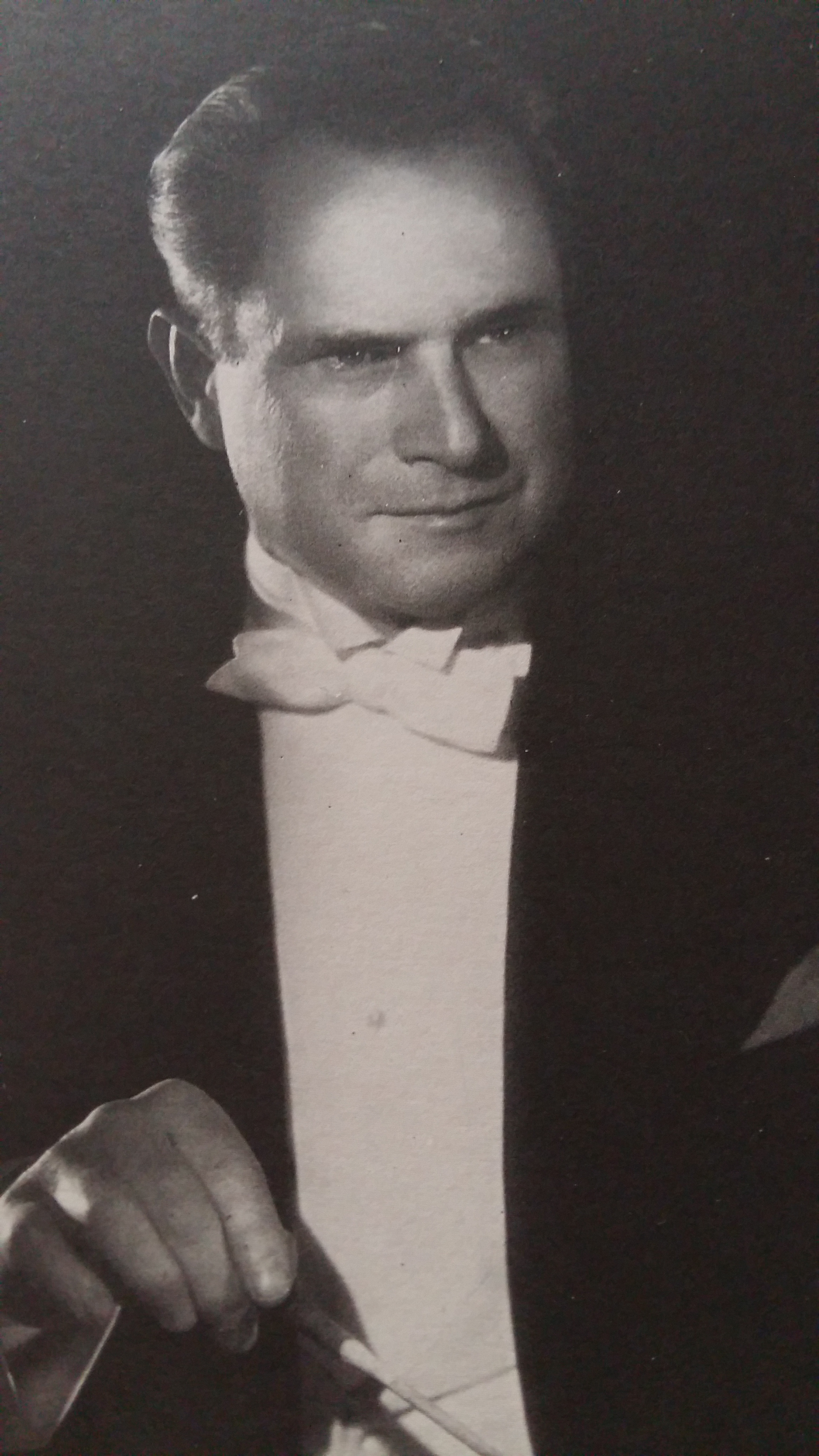
Edmund J. Pendleton

Edmund J. Pendleton (1 March 1899 – 31 January 1987) was an American composer and musician.

== Early life ==
Pendleton was born in Cincinnati on 1 March 1899, and later attended Columbia University in New York. His elder brother was Olympic wrestler and screen actor Nathaniel Greene Pendleton (1895–1967), better known professionally as Nat Pendleton.

== Career ==
In Europe, Pendleton studied under Paul Dukas for composition, Charles Münch, Pierre Monteux and Igor Markevitch for orchestral direction. He composed many works, including Alpine Concerto for flute (1943), Concerto for viola (1983), the Dream of Yann (opera for children, 1970), and the Miracle of the Nativity (a lyric drama written in 1975). Pendleton was the organist and choir master for the American Church in Paris from 1935 until 1975. He was also a music critic for the New York Herald Tribune for twenty years. He maintained friendly relations with James Joyce, Ernest Hemingway, and Pablo Picasso. He died in Paris on 31 January 1987 and is buried at Guitrancourt Cemetery in Yvelines.

== Selected works ==
Stage

- Le Rêve de Yann (Dream of Yann), Opera for children (1970)
- Le Miracle de la Nativité (The Miracle of the Nativity), Lyric Drama (1975)

Concertante

- Concerto alpestre (Alpine Concerto) for flute and orchestra (1943)
- Concerto for viola and orchestra (1983)

== Discography (partial) ==
- The Miracle of the Nativity/La Nativity, with instrumentalist Jean-Walter Audoli, vocalist Michel Piquemal, direction: Jean-Walter Audoli, Cybelia, Paris, 1990
- Bid Adieu to Girlish Days, Musical arrangement by Edmund Pendleton, words by James Joyce
