= Eadie Adams =

American actress (1907–1983)

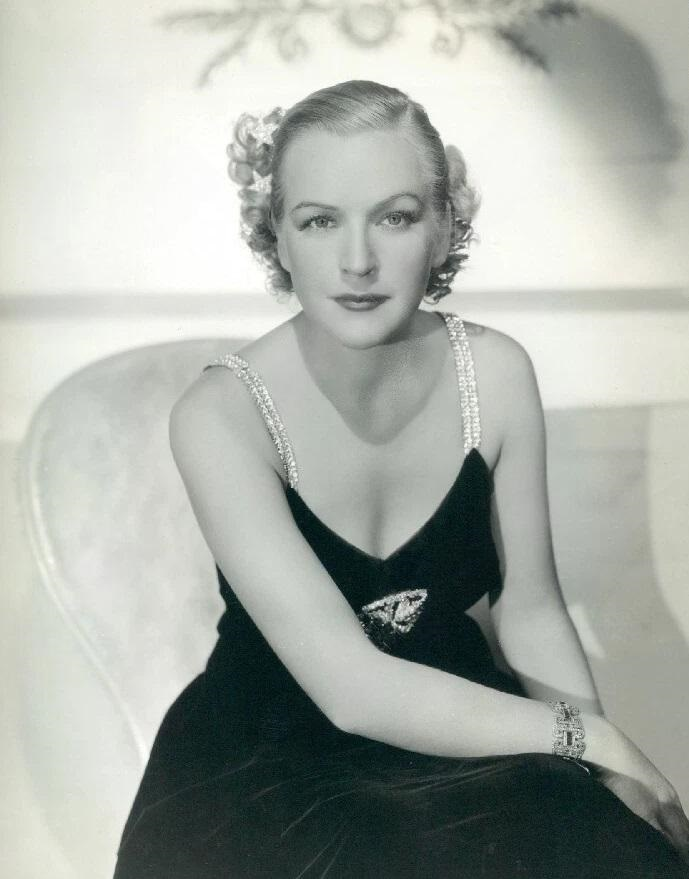
- Adams in Sinner Take All (1937)
- Born: August 8, 1907; Chicago, Illinois, U.S.
- Died: March 30, 1983 (aged 75); Palm Springs, California, U.S.
- Occupation: Actress
- Years active: 1935–1937

Eadie Adams (August 8, 1907 – March 30, 1983) was an American singer and film actress. She appeared in several films between 1935 and 1937.

== Career ==
Adams was the first singer with Kay Kyser and his orchestra. Prior to March 1936, Adams sang at a night club while studying acting for six months. After that, she gave up singing to focus on her work in films. She was cast as a cabaret singer in After the Thin Man. Adams' film credits include Big City, The 13th Man, Sinner Take All, Reckless, I'll Love You Always and Restless Knights.

== Realty ==
Adams owned a home near Demuth Park in Palm Springs, California. After she retired from acting, Adams formed Eadie Adams Realty in Palm Springs and Palm Desert. Upon her death in 1983 she was buried at the Hope Town Cemetery in Lostant, Illinois.
