= Sinner Take All =

1936 film by Errol Taggart

- Directed by: Errol Taggart
- Screenplay by: Leonard Lee; Walter Wise
- Based on: Murder for a Wanton; 1934 novel by Whitman Chambers
- Produced by: Lucien Hubbard; Samuel Marx
- Starring: Bruce Cabot; Margaret Lindsay; Joseph Calleia
- Cinematography: Leonard Smith
- Edited by: William S. Gray
- Music by: Edward Ward
- Production company: Metro-Goldwyn-Mayer
- Distributed by: Loew's Inc.
- Release date: December 18, 1936
- Running time: 74 minutes
- Country: United States
- Language: English

Sinner Take All is a 1936 American murder mystery film directed by Errol Taggart and starring Bruce Cabot, Margaret Lindsay and Joseph Calleia.

== Plot ==
When millionaire New York City businessman Aaron Lampier receives a death threat in the mail, he sends for his offspring. Ernie Hyams, a newspaper reporter turned lawyer, is dispatched by MacKelvey, his former editor, to track down Lampier's daughter Lorraine. She does not appreciate being dragged away from the nightclub/casino of Frank Penny. She and her perpetually drunk brother Stephen have also received similar mail. When their brother David is killed in a car crash that night, Ernie soon discovers it was not an accident; a wire cable strung across the road caused it. Ernie is pressured into investigating.

Lampier's will leaves everything equally to his children. If they predecease him, the estate goes to various charities.

Stephen is the next victim. An associate of Penny's is driving Stephen's car when he is stopped by the police. They find Stephen's body inside with six shots to the head; the driver claims he did not know it was there when he stole the automobile. Captain Bill Royce of the Homicide Squad arrests Penny, but has to release him for lack of evidence. It turns out that David is still alive and in hiding. By the time Ernie and MacKelvey track him down, though, he has been stabbed to death.

Next is Aaron Lampier. A man climbs down to his suite and, after a struggle, flings him over the terrace to his death.

To protect Lorraine (to whom he has become attracted), Ernie sets a trap. He spreads the word that she is flying away at midnight, then gathers all the prime suspects at Penny's nightclub to see her off. Her drink is poisoned, but a doctor is standing by and she is saved. Ernie sadly identifies the killer; MacKelvey was the only one who had the opportunity to slip poison into the liquor. The editor confesses that he needed more money to keep his wife Alicia happy. He figured that with the Lampiers all dead, he would be put in charge of one of their businesses. Afterward, Ernie and Lorraine get married.

== Cast ==
- Bruce Cabot as Ernie
- Margaret Lindsay as Lorraine
- Joseph Calleia as Penny
- Stanley Ridges as MacKelvey
- Vivienne Osborne as Alicia
- Charley Grapewin as Aaron
- Edward Pawley as Royce
- George Lynn as Stephen
- Theodore von Eltz as David (as Theodore Von Eltz)
- Eadie Adams as Shirley
- George Zucco as Bascomb
- Dorothy Kilgallen as Reporter
- Raymond Hatton as Hotel Clerk
- Richard Terry as Pete

== Critical reception ==
In their March, 1937 edition, Modern Screen gave the film a two-star review and described it as "a fast-moving, well-paced murder mystery, that remains completely baffling until the denouement."
