= Song of the City =

1937 film by Errol Taggart

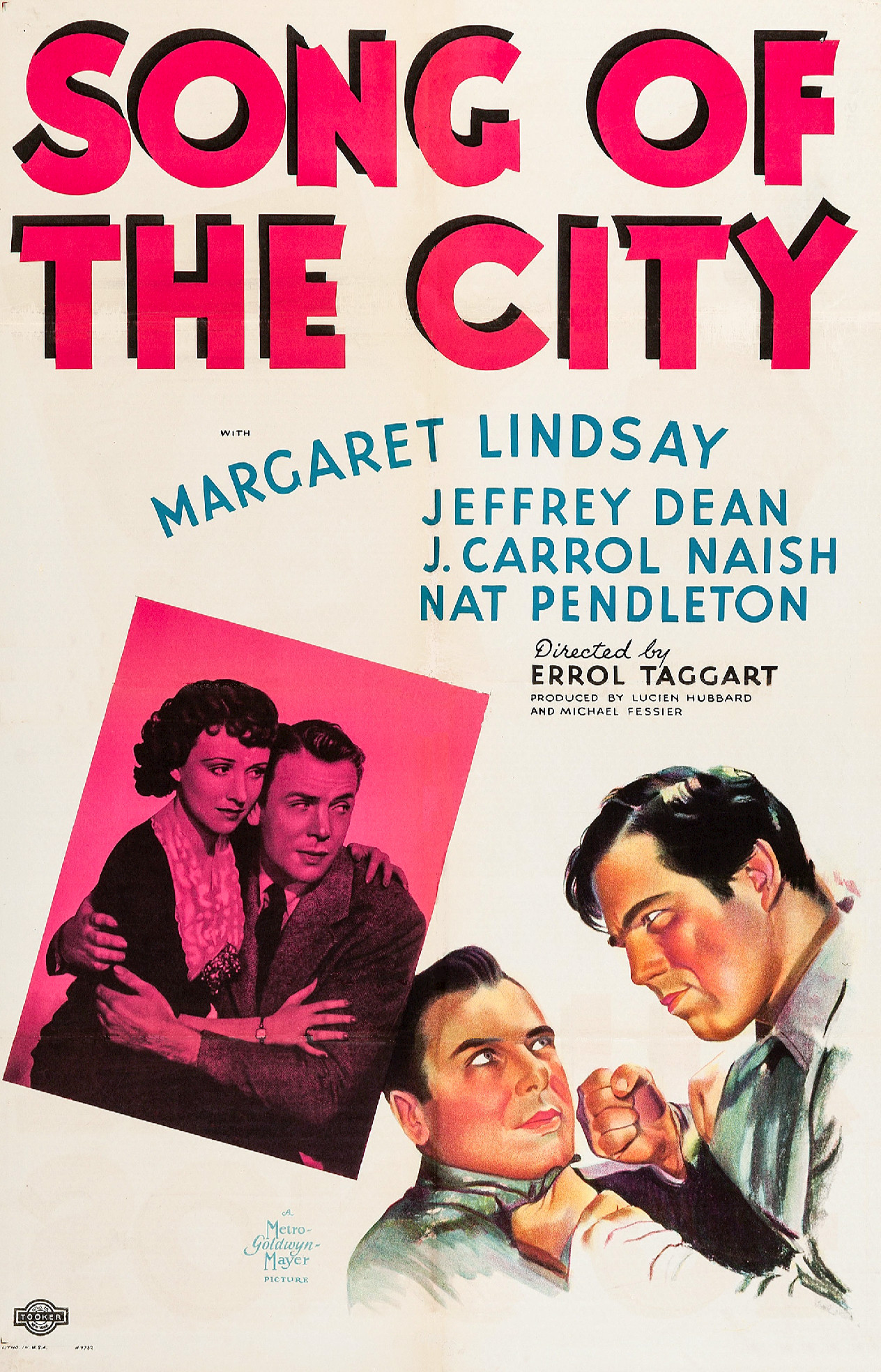
- Theatrical release poster
- Directed by: Errol Taggart
- Screenplay by: Michael Fessier
- Story by: Michael Fessier
- Produced by: Michael Fessier; Lucien Hubbard
- Starring: Margaret Lindsay; Dean Jagger; J. Carrol Naish; Nat Pendleton; Dennis Morgan; Marla Shelton
- Cinematography: Leonard Smith
- Edited by: John Baxter Rogers
- Music by: William Axt
- Production company: Metro-Goldwyn-Mayer
- Distributed by: Metro-Goldwyn-Mayer
- Release date: April 2, 1937
- Running time: 68 minutes
- Country: United States
- Language: English

Song of the City is a 1937 American musical film directed by Errol Taggart, written by Michael Fessier, and starring Margaret Lindsay, Dean Jagger, J. Carrol Naish, Nat Pendleton, Dennis Morgan and Marla Shelton. It was released on April 2, 1937, by Metro-Goldwyn-Mayer.

== Plot ==
Paul Herrick falls overboard and gets rescued and involved with an Italian family.

== Cast ==
- Margaret Lindsay as Angelina Romandi
- Dean Jagger as Paul Herrick
- J. Carrol Naish as Mario
- Nat Pendleton as Benvenuto Romandi
- Dennis Morgan as Tommy
- Marla Shelton as Jane Lansing
- Inez Palange as Mrs. 'Mama' Romandi
- Charles Judels as Mr. Pietro 'Papa' Romandi
- Edward Norris as Guido Romandi
- Fay Helm as Marge
- Frank Puglia as Tony
