= Errol Taggart =

Canadian film director and film editor

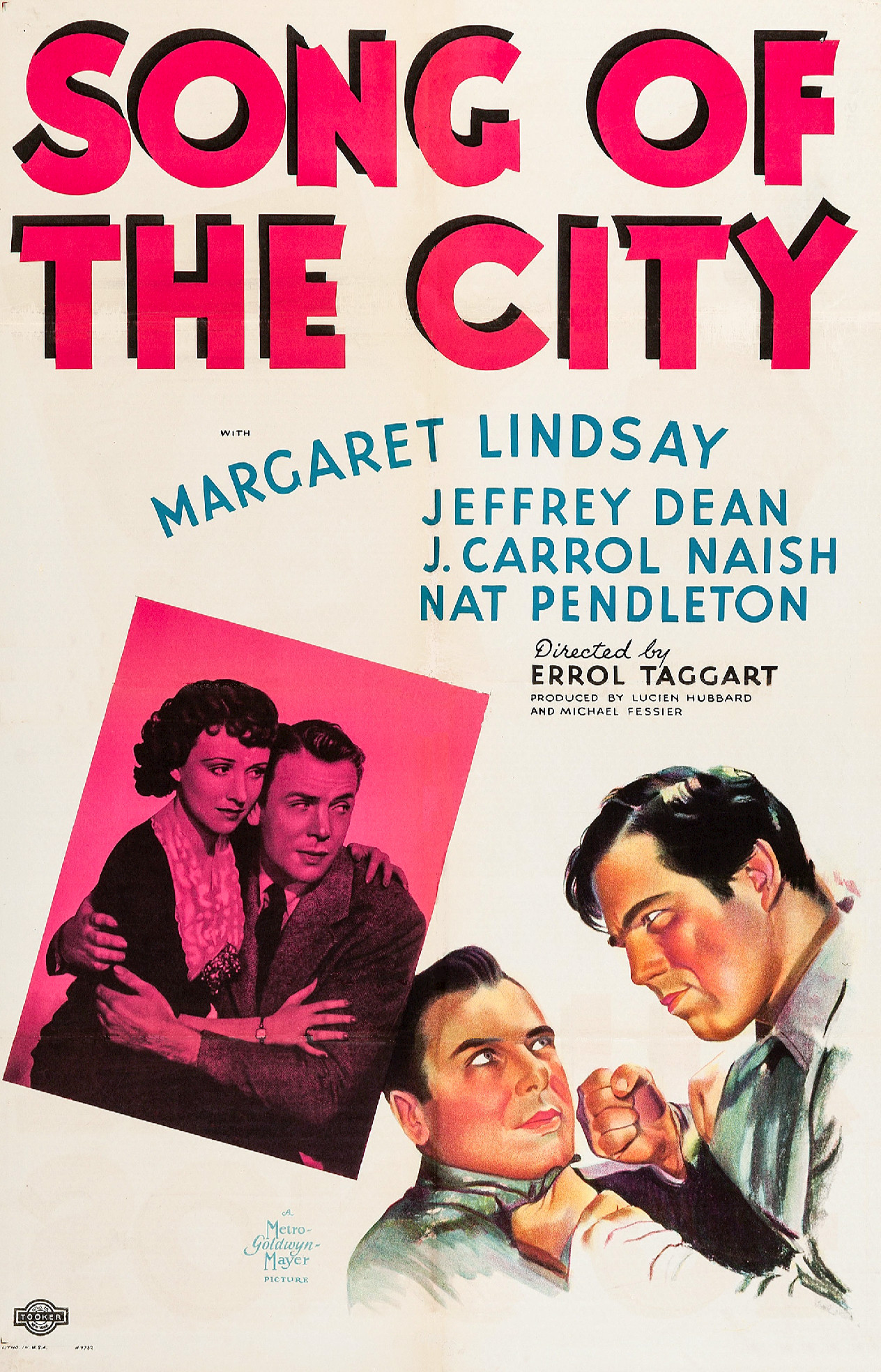
Poster for the 1937 film Song of the City

Errol Taggart (July 15, 1895 – August 30, 1940) was a Canadian film director and film editor who worked in Hollywood during the 1920s and 1930s. He was the editor of four movies directed by Tod Browning and starring Lon Chaney: The Unknown (uncredited) with Joan Crawford, The Road to Mandalay, The Blackbird, and the lost film London After Midnight (uncredited). He also edited Browning's film Drifting featuring Wallace Beery and Anna May Wong in supporting roles, and was Browning's first assistant director on Freaks (uncredited) featuring Olga Baclanova and a cast of actual carnival sideshow freaks. Taggart also directed seven films, including Sinner Take All, Song of the City, and The Women Men Marry.

Taggart died on August 30, 1940, at the age of 45 in Los Angeles, California.

== Selected filmography ==
- After Business Hours (1925)
