= Escape by Night (1937 film) =

1937 film by Hamilton MacFadden

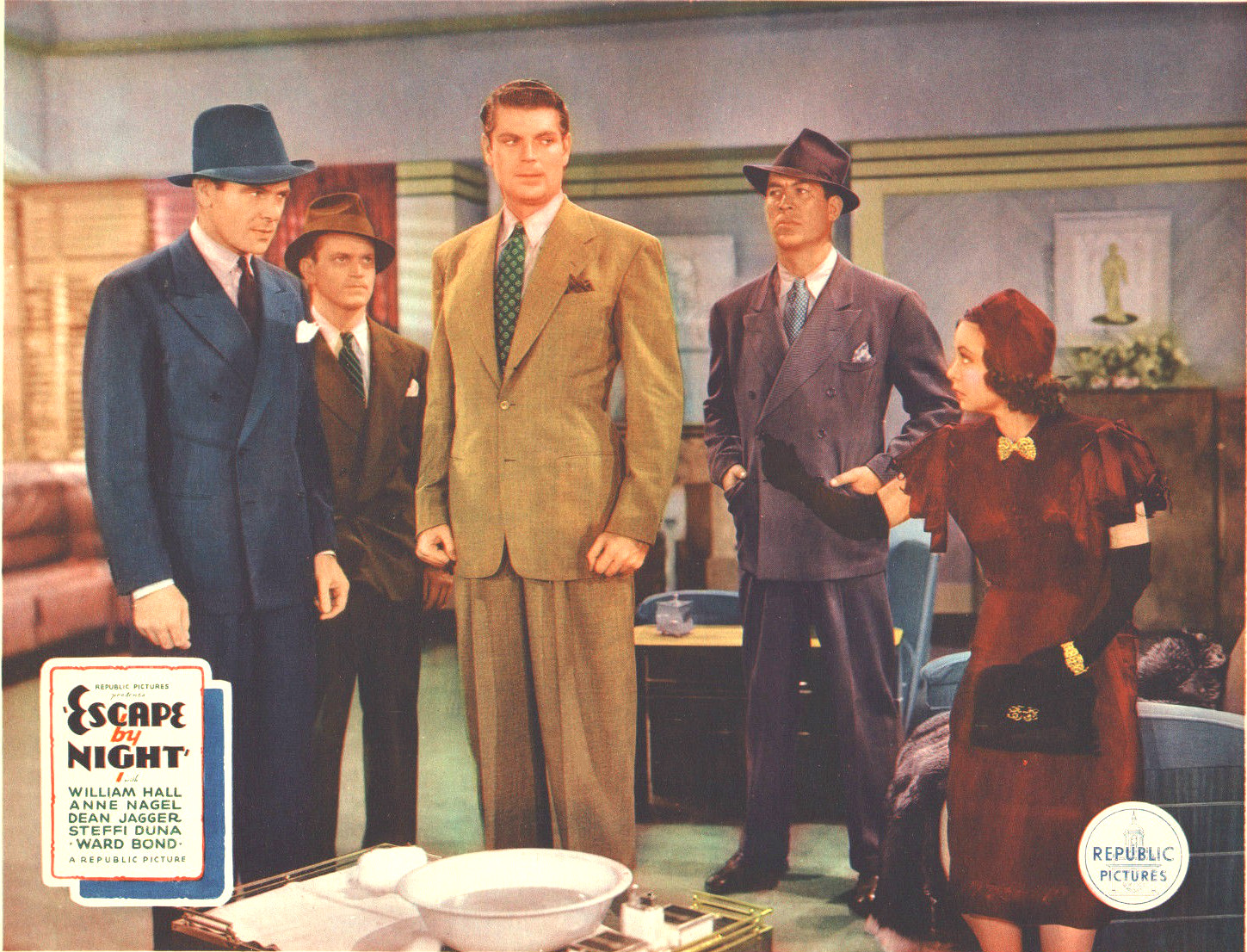
- Lobby card
- Directed by: Hamilton MacFadden
- Written by: Harold Shumate (original screenplay)
- Produced by: Harold Shumate (associate producer)
- Starring: William Hall; Anne Nagel
- Cinematography: Edward Snyder
- Edited by: W. Donn Hayes
- Music by: Alberto Colombo
- Distributed by: Republic Pictures
- Release date: September 1, 1937 (United States)
- Running time: 64 minutes
- Country: United States
- Language: English

Escape by Night (also known as Fool's Paradise) is a 1937 American film directed by Hamilton MacFadden and starring William Hall and Anne Nagel. It was written by Harold Shumate.

== Plot ==
Members of the Capper gang rent a room from a blind man and his daughter and help them restore their farm. Another member of their gang arrives and orders their return, leading to a conflict.

== Cast ==
- William Hall as Nicholas "Nick" Allen
- Anne Nagel as Linda Adams
- Dean Jagger as James "Capper" Regan
- Steffi Duna as Josephine "Jo" Elliott
- Ward Bond as Peter "Spudsy" Baker
- Murray Alper as Horace "Red" Graham
- Charles Waldron as Pop Adams
- George Meeker as Fred Peters
- Wallis Clark as District Attorney Baldwin
- Arthur Aylesworth as Sheriff Charlie Thornton
- Anthony Warde as Mike Grayson
- Bill as Bill, the guide dog

== Reception ==
Variety wrote: "Romantic meller in low gear. No marquee strength, carbon copy yarn and ordinary performance. ... Production, direction and acting is pretty much what the story deserves. Charles Waldron, however, cashes in on the quiet possibilities of the blind man, while Bill, as the Seeing-Eye pooch, is a fair successor to Rin Tin Tin."

The Hollywood Reporter wrote: "A swell little cops and robbers picture, with an out-of-the-ordinary story. It is well acted, moves rapidly, and a tightly written script makes the improbable theme – regeneration of crooks by farm life – seem believable. ... Only for a short time in the middle does the film lag."

The Monthly Film Bulletin wrote: "This film has a placid tempo after a vigorous beginning; It has moments of excitement and moments of pathos, and the climaxes are well spaced and created. The characterisation and development of the reform of the gangsters are well drawn and well brought out by the direction."
