= American Church in Paris =

- Église américaine de Paris
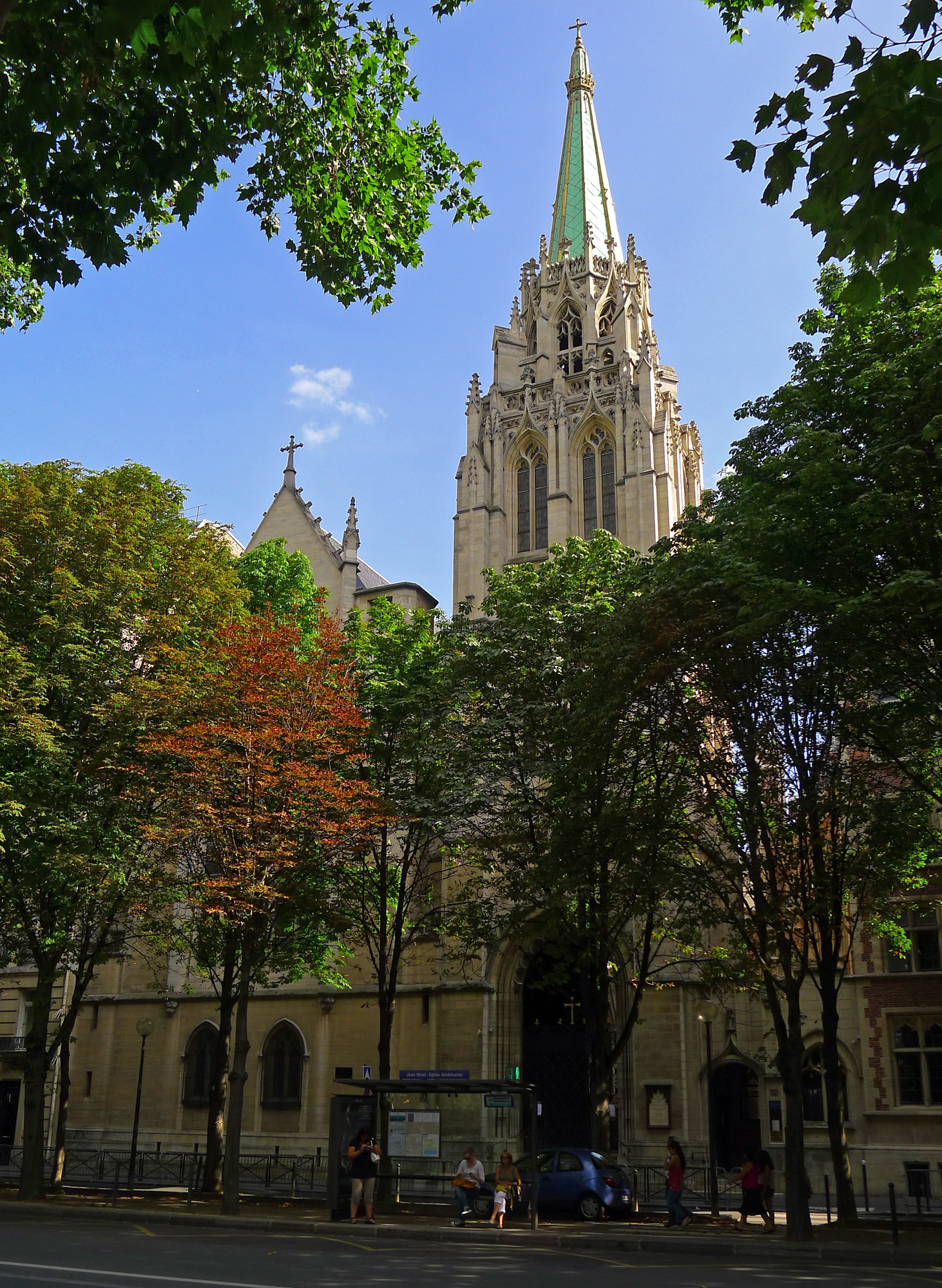
- Street view of the American Church in Paris from the Quai d'Orsay

- The location of the American Church in Paris
- 48°51′44.0″N 2°18′23.7″E
- Location: Paris
- Country: France
- Denomination: Interdenominational
- Website: acparis.org

History
- Former name: American Chapel in Paris
- Founded: 1814
- Dedication: 1931

Architecture
- Style: 15th century Gothic
- Groundbreaking: March 1, 1926
- Completed: September 6, 1931

Specifications
- Capacity: 600 (main level), 100 (balcony)

The American Church in Paris (French: Église américaine de Paris; formerly the American Chapel in Paris) was the first American church established outside the United States. It traces its roots back to 1814, and the present church building – located at 65 Quai d'Orsay in the 7th arrondissement of Paris – dates to 1931.

== History ==
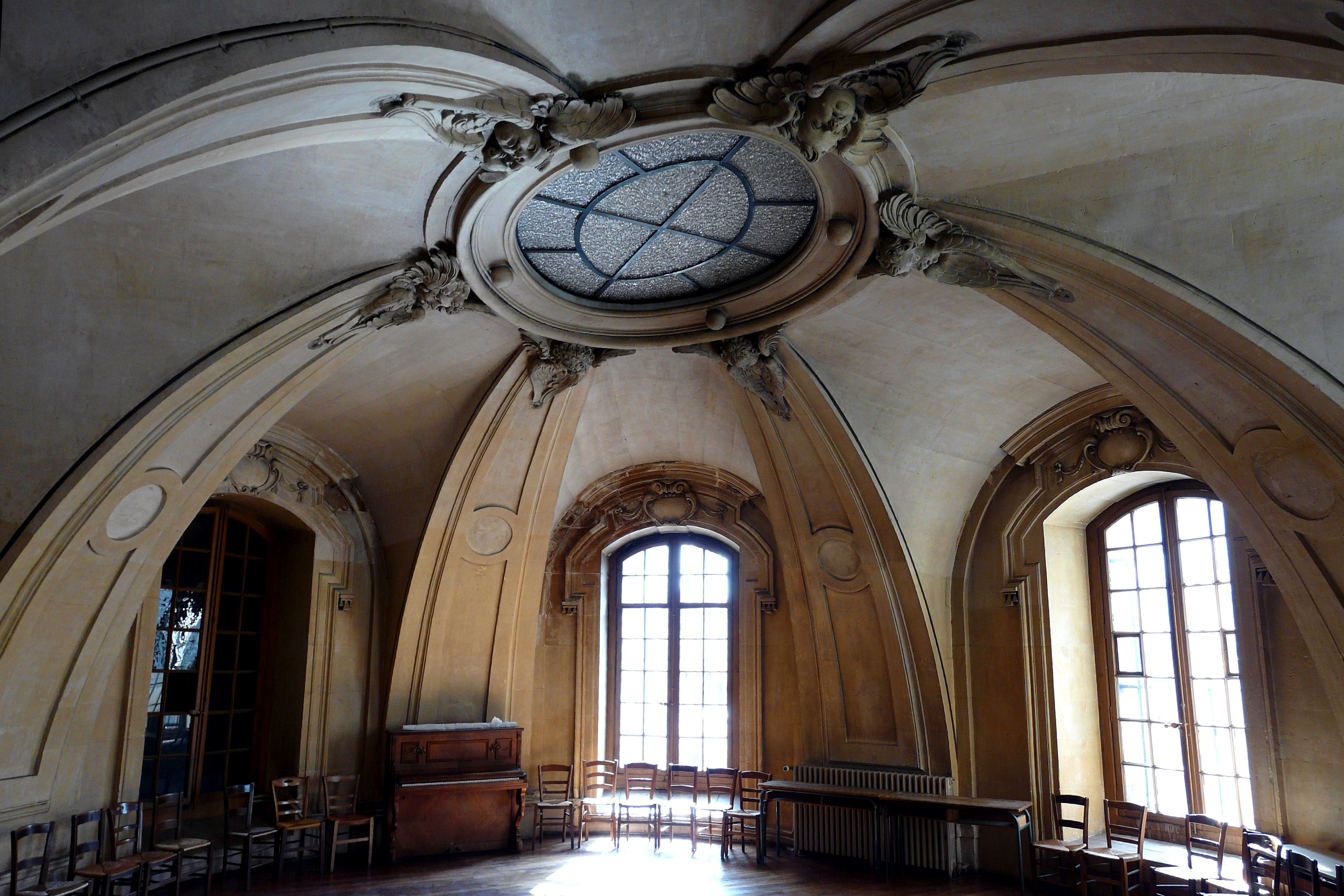
The upper room in l'Oratoire du Louvre, home to American worship services from 1816 to 1830.

In 1814, American Protestants started worshiping together in homes around Paris and at the Oratoire du Louvre temple. The first American sanctuary was built in 1857, on rue de Berri.

The American Church in Paris was then, as now, an independent interdenominational fellowship, for all those adhering to the historic Christian tradition as expressed in the Apostles' Creed. It served both the American expat community, and a wide variety of other English-speaking people from different countries and denominational backgrounds.

== Today ==
The American Church, or ACP, continues to minister to many Anglophone Protestants in Paris, with multicultural programming, and a congregation coming from some 40 nations and 35 Christian denominations.

The congregation is led in worship by the senior pastor, associate pastor, youth & young adults pastor and a retired guest pastor who handles weddings. Its staff is also diverse in terms of background and denomination. It is run by a church council represented by a committee of ministries namely: Communications, Community Life, Christian Education, Facilities, Finance and Stewardship, Human Resources, Welcoming, Mission Engagement, and Worship and Music. The building hosts two bilingual nursery schools, a variety of twelve-step program recovery groups, fitness classes, kung fu, basketball leagues, a free concert series, and an ad board for housing and job opportunities. Many more community-based services are housed in the church building.

The closest métro station is Invalides

== Gallery ==
The church spire and the Eiffel Tower

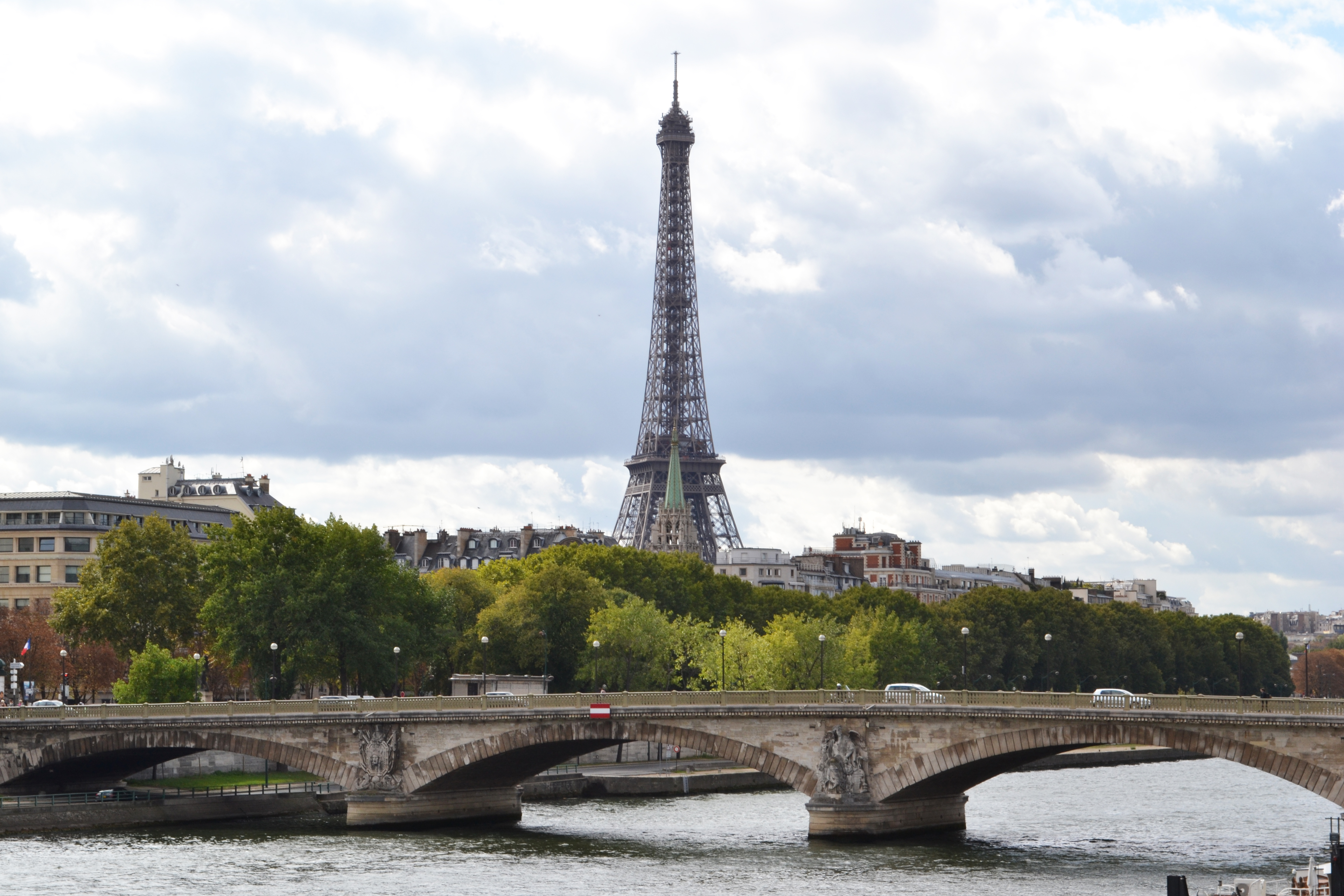
The distinctive green spire of the American Church in Paris in front of the base of the Eiffel Tower

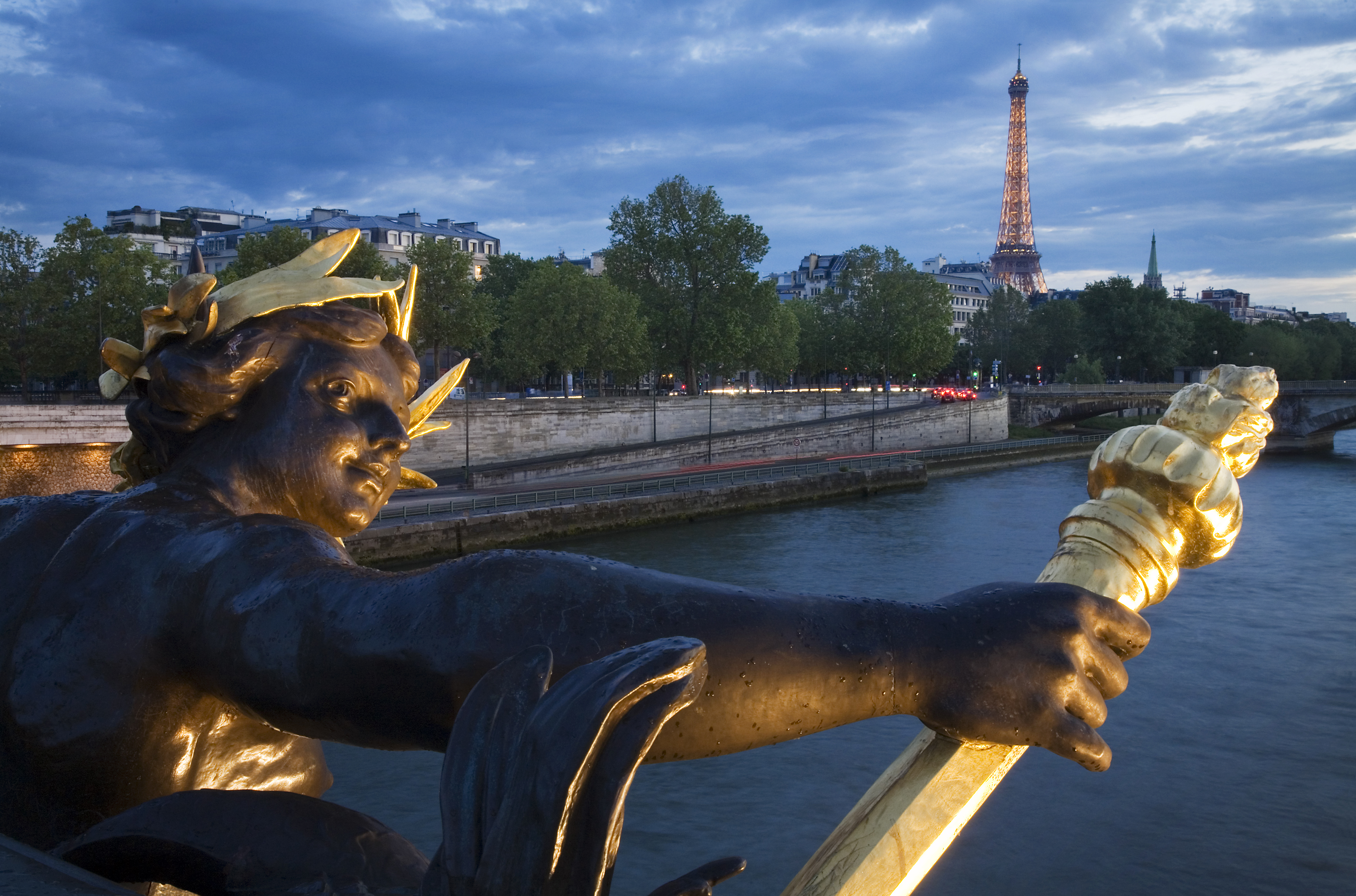
The Eiffel Tower from the Pont Alexandre III with the church spire on the right

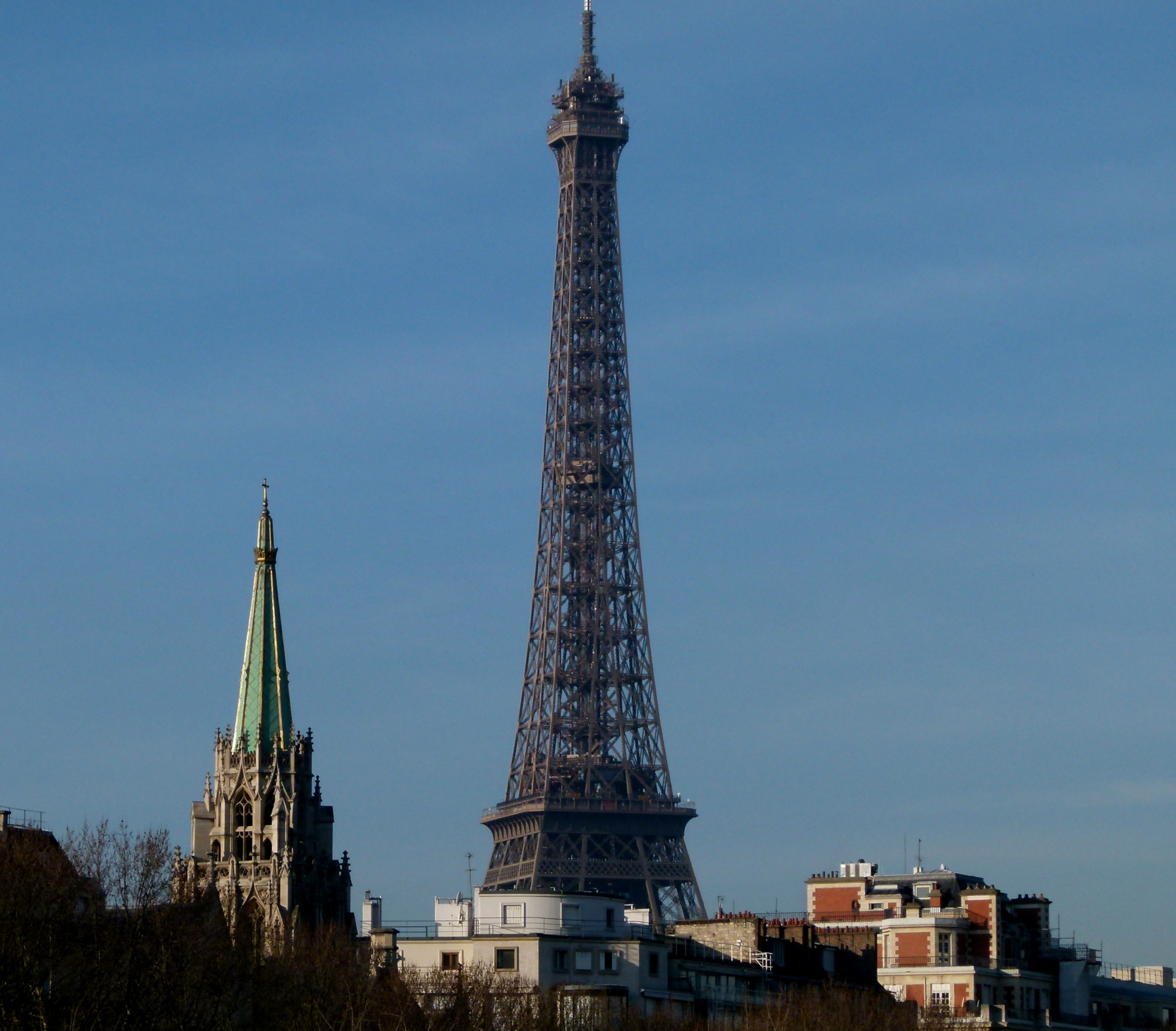
A close-up view of the spire from the Invalides bridge, with the Eiffel Tower in the background

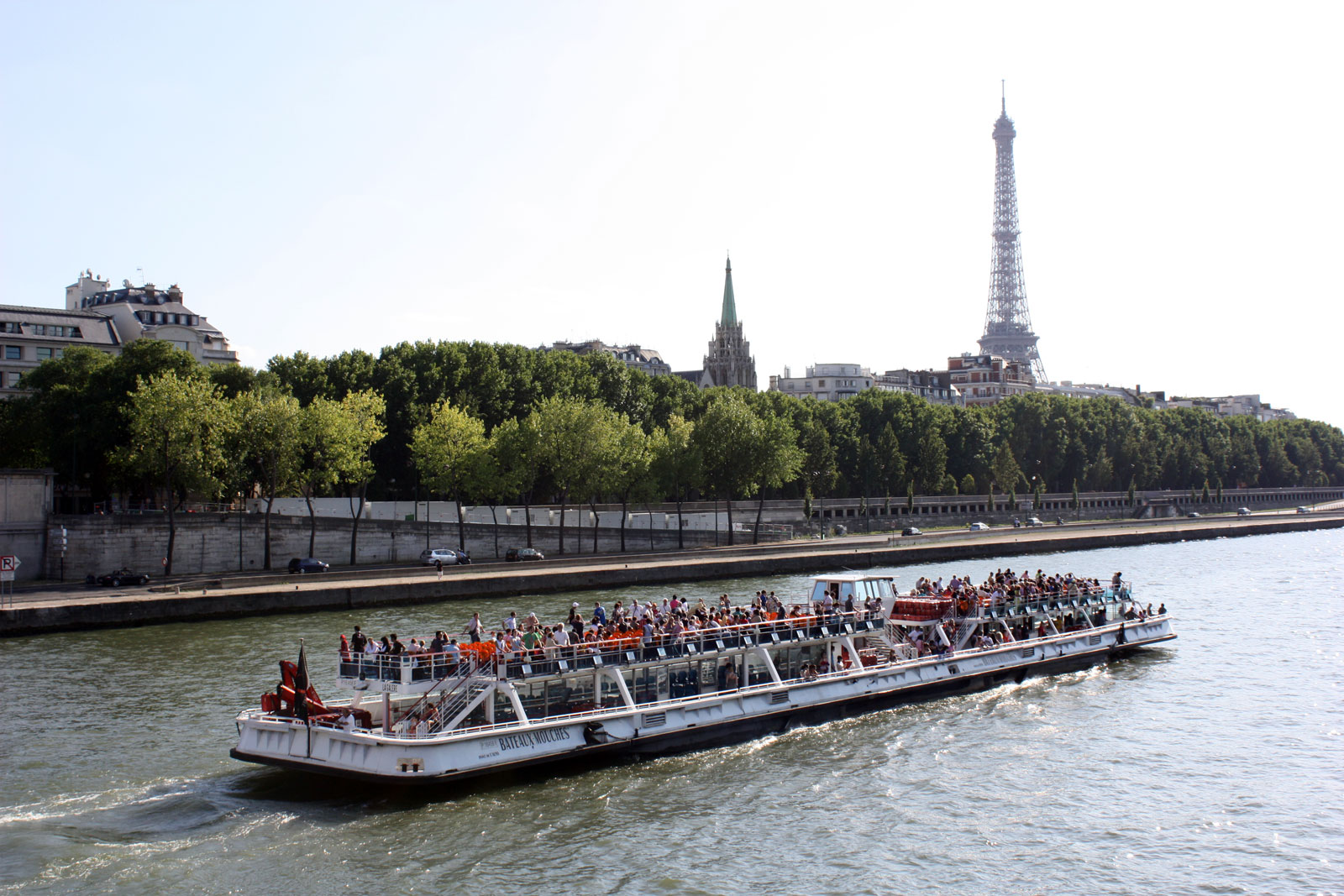
The spire, center, as seen from the Invalides bridge
Views of the Church

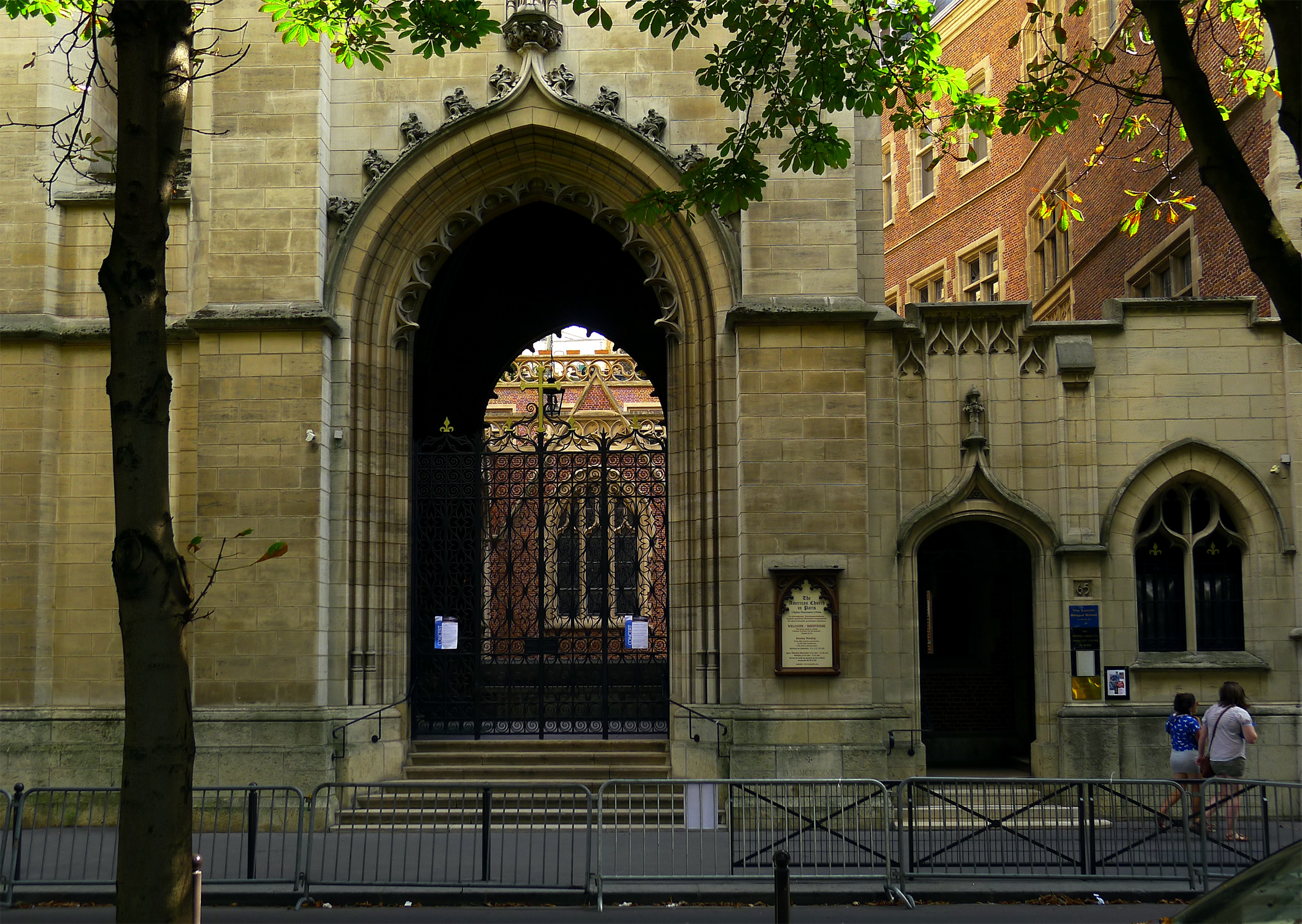
The church entrance from Quai d'Orsay

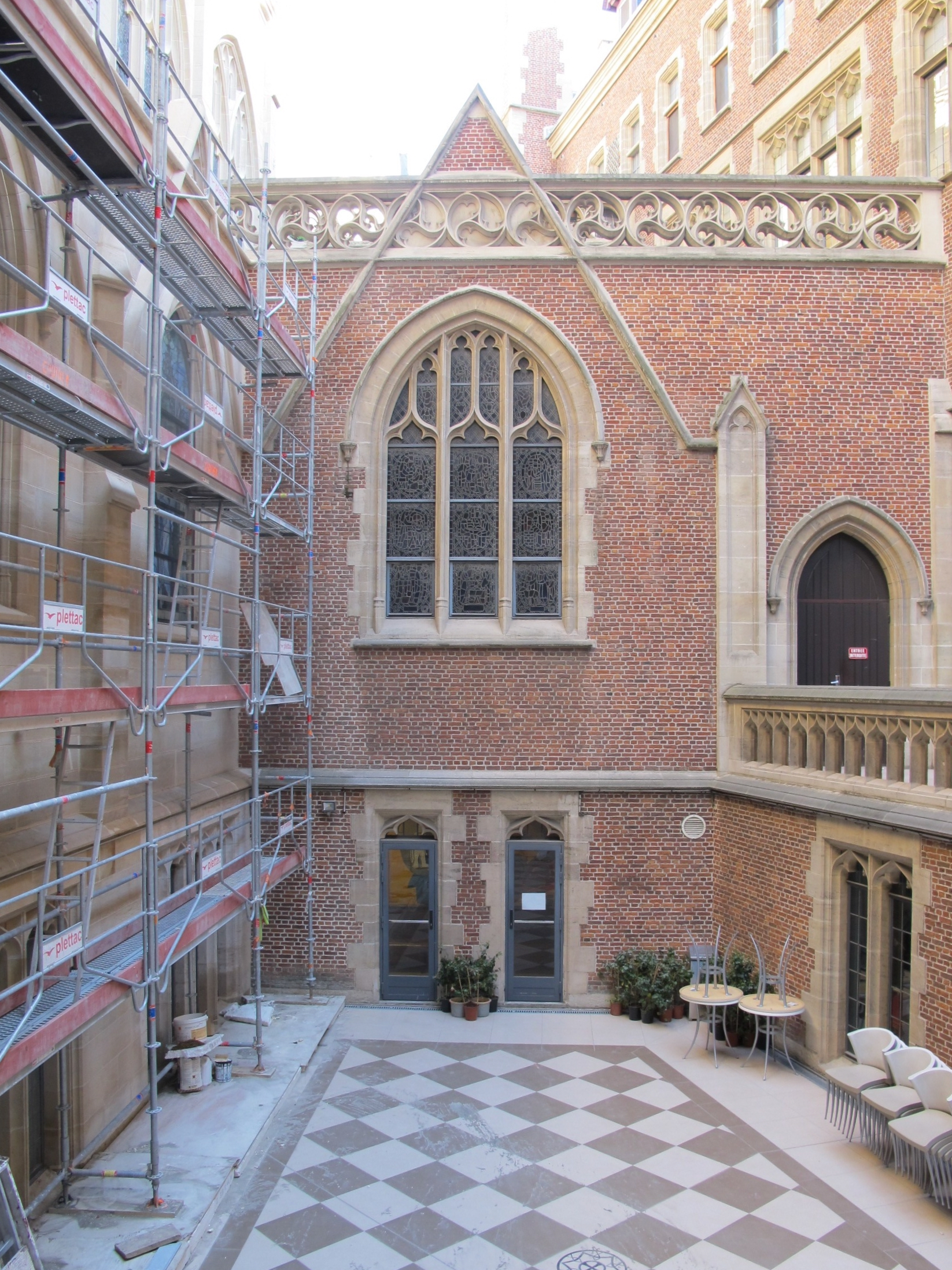
The courtyard, with the parish house on the right and the sanctuary on the left

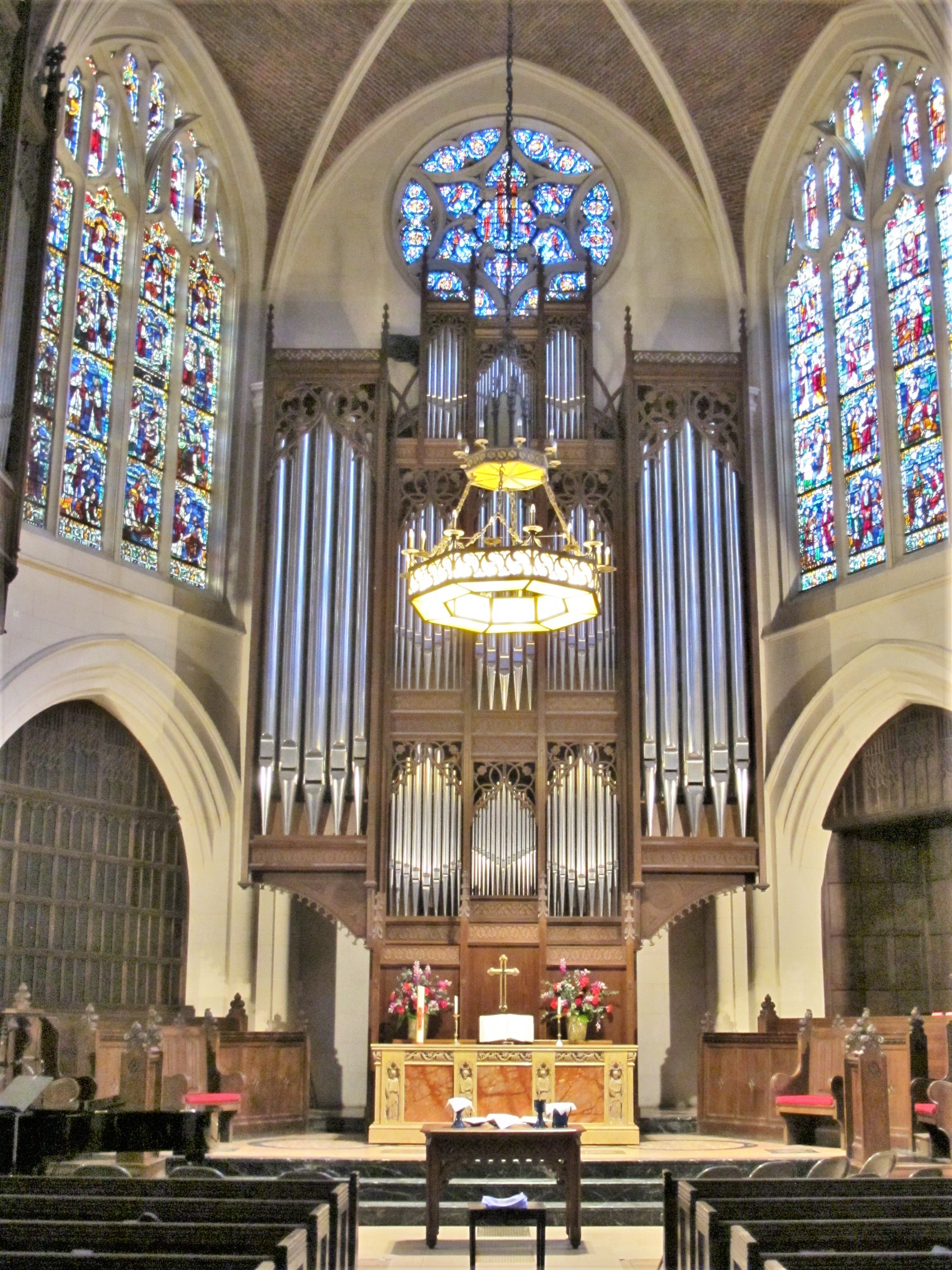
The communion table and organ

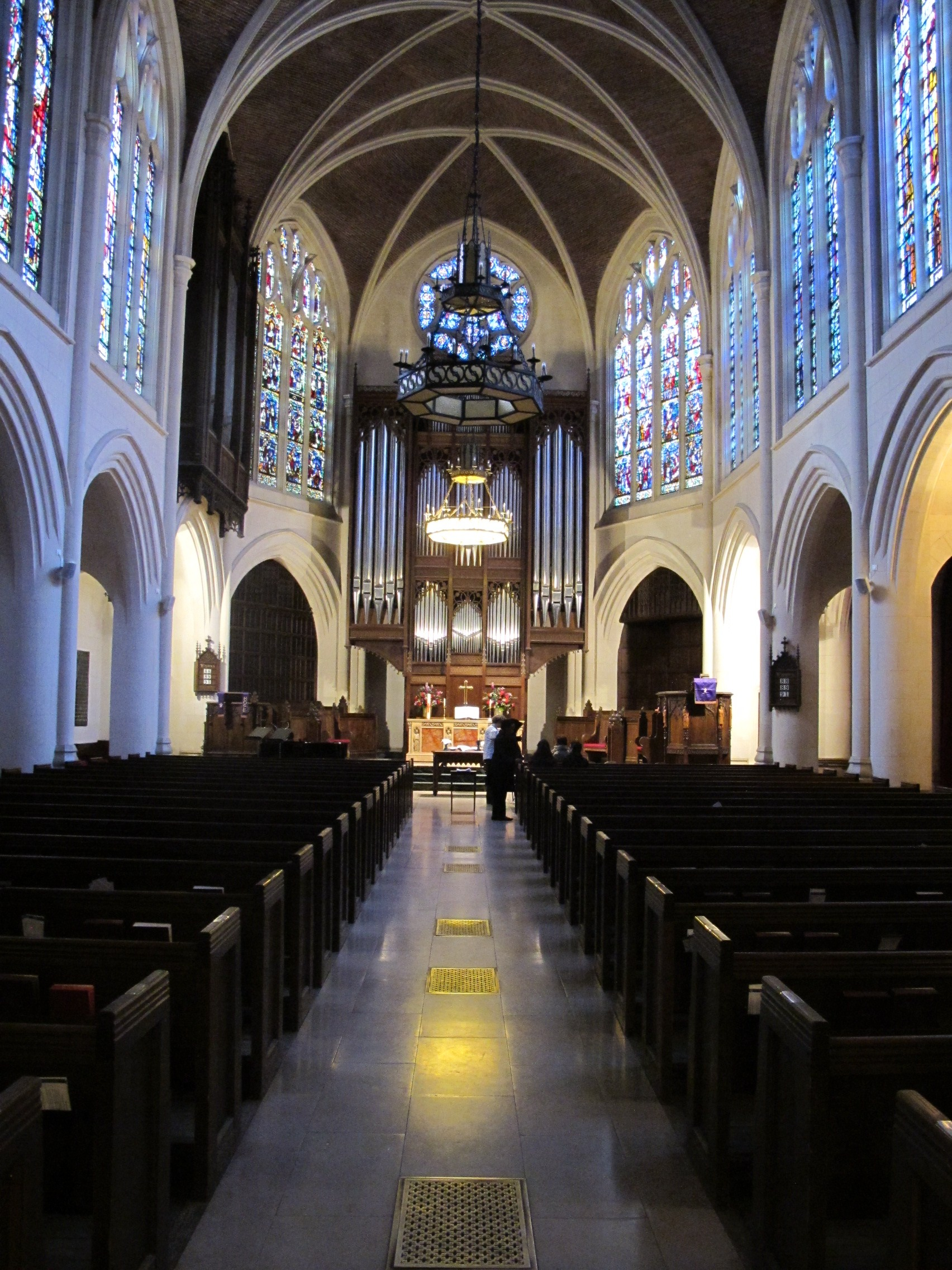
Nave

== See also ==
- American Cathedral in Paris
- American Church in Berlin
- American Church in Rome
- The Scots Kirk

== Sources ==
- Cochran, Joseph W. (1931). Friendly Adventurers a Chronicle of the American Church of Paris (1857-1931). Paris: Brentano's. ASIN B000J0NSKA. Archived from the original on September 12, 2018.
