= Jack Hill =

American filmmaker (born 1933)

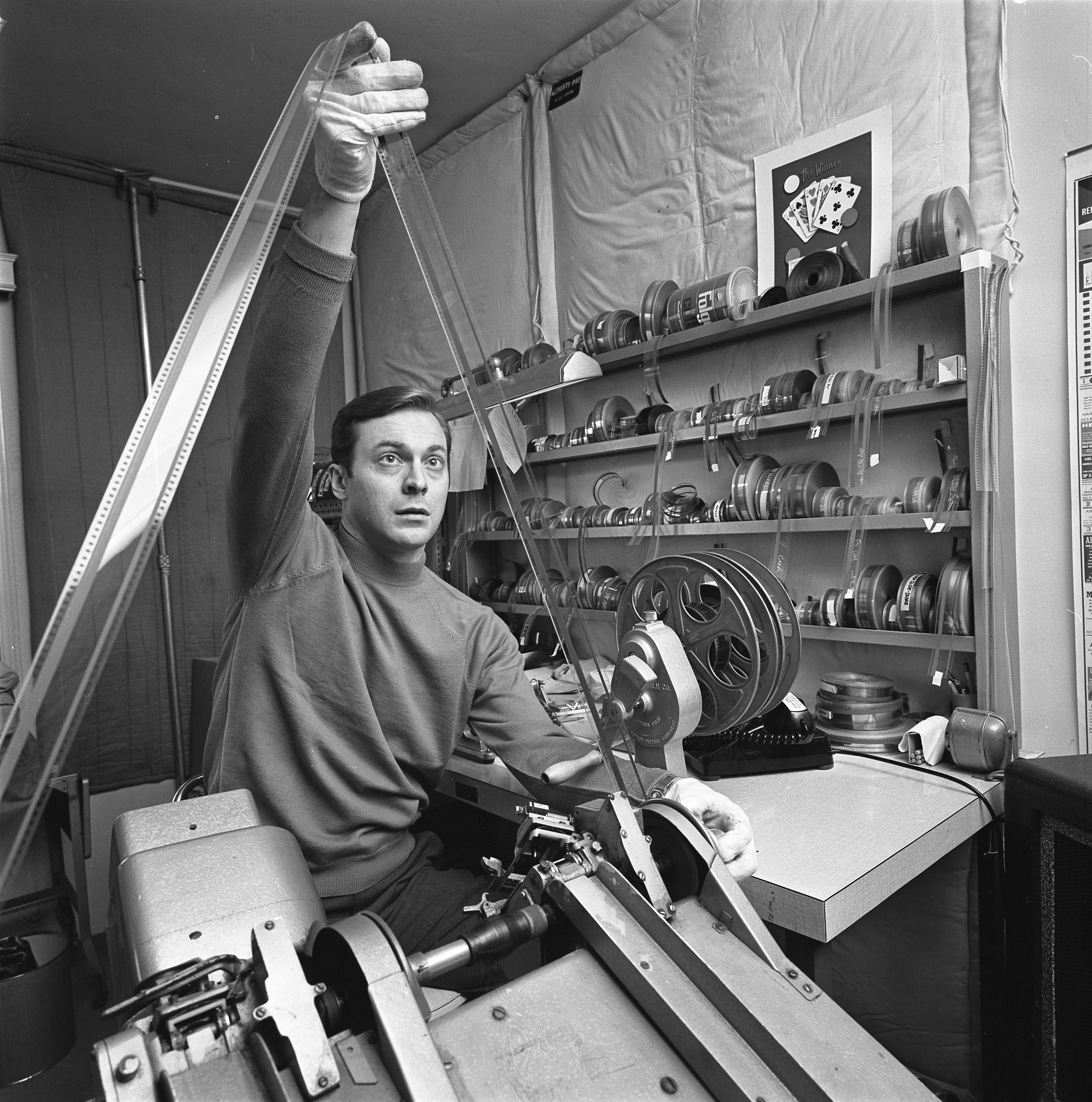
- Hill in 1968.
- Born: January 28, 1933 (age 93); Los Angeles, California, U.S.
- Other name: Brian Stuart
- Education: University of California, Los Angeles
- Occupations: Film director; screenwriter; producer; cinematographer; editor
- Years active: 1960–1982

Jack Hill (born January 28, 1933) is an American filmmaker, known for his work in the exploitation genre. He was an early associate of Francis Ford Coppola and Roger Corman, and worked on many films distributed by American International Pictures (AIP) during the 1960s and 1970s.

Hill's directorial works include Spider Baby (1967), Pit Stop (1969), The Big Doll House (1971), Coffy (1973), Foxy Brown (1974), and Switchblade Sisters (1975). He is also credited with helping cultivate the careers of actors Pam Grier, Sid Haig, and Ellen Burstyn. Quentin Tarantino described him as “the Howard Hawks of exploitation filmmaking”.

== Early life and education ==
Hill was born January 28, 1933, in Los Angeles, California. His mother, Mildred (née Pannill, b. February 1, 1907; death date n.a.), was a music teacher. His father, Roland E. Hill (February 5, 1895 – November 10, 1986), worked as a set designer and art director for First National Pictures and Warner Bros. on films including The Jazz Singer, Captain Blood, Action in the North Atlantic, and Captain Horatio Hornblower, and as well was an architect who designed the centerpiece Sleeping Beauty Castle at Disneyland in California.

Hill attended UCLA, he said, for "a couple of years" before leaving to get married and then returning to earn a degree in music. While a student, he played in a symphony orchestra that performed for the soundtracks of Doctor Zhivago and The Brothers Karamazov, and he arranged music for burlesque performers; through this he met comedian Lenny Bruce, whose daughter Kitty Bruce would act in Hill's 1975 film Switchblade Sisters. He went on to postgraduate studies at UCLA Film School, where instructor and former movie director Dorothy Arzner encouraged Hill and his classmate and friend Francis Ford Coppola. Hill worked as a cameraman, a sound recorder (including on Coppola's student short Ayamonn the Terrible), and an editor on student films. His short The Host starred Sid Haig, an acting student at the Pasadena Playhouse under teacher Arzner, who introduced them; this marked the first of several films together.

== Career ==
=== With Francis Ford Coppola ===
Hill worked with Coppola and Roger Corman on several of the former's early movies at American International Pictures (AIP). He was the director of photography on Battle Beyond the Sun (1962), a re-edit of the Soviet sci-fi film Nebo Zovyot (1959), which featured additional scenes directed by Coppola and shot by Hill. He was the second unit director on Coppola's full directorial debut Dementia 13 (1963). He also worked on Coppola's sexploitation films Tonight for Sure (as director of photography) and The Bellboy and the Playgirls (as editor).

Hill was one of several uncredited directors (including Coppola) who worked on Corman's infamous The Terror (1963), starring Boris Karloff and a young Jack Nicholson.

=== With Roger Corman ===
Hill was hired by Corman to direct Blood Bath (1966), a retooling of a Yugoslavian-produced spy thriller as a horror B-movie about a shapeshifting vampire. The troubled production meant Hill was eventually replaced by Stephanie Rothman, the two were jointly credited on the final film.

Hill also added 20 minutes to Corman's Wasp Woman (1959) for its eventual television syndication release, shooting without access to any original cast-member.

=== Independent productions ===
In 1967, Hill directed Spider Baby, a horror-comedy about a deranged family featuring Sid Haig in a starring role. The film was initially released to relative obscurity, but eventually achieved cult status.

The following year, he was hired by Mexican producers Luis Enrique Vergara and Juan Ibáñez to co-direct four films featuring Boris Karloff. Hill only directed Karloff's scenes in Los Angeles, which were shot separately from the rest of the cast in Mexico.

In 1969, he directed Pit Stop, a drama about Figure 8 racing featuring Ellen Burstyn in an early starring role.

=== With Pam Grier ===
Hill is credited with discovering Pam Grier while the actress was working as a switchboard operator at AIP. He directed her in two women-in-prison films produced by Corman's newly-formed New World Pictures, The Big Doll House (1971) and The Big Bird Cage (1972), quickly making her a star of the burgeoning blaxploitation genre.

He then directed her in two similar films at AIP, Coffy (1973) and Foxy Brown (1974), both of which were considerable commercial successes and firmly established Grier's stardom.

=== Later works ===
The same year, Hill directed the sex comedy The Swinging Cheerleaders (1974). In 1975, Hill directed Switchblade Sisters, about an all-girl teen gang.

Hill co-wrote the disaster film City on Fire (1979) and Death Ship (1980) for director Alvin Rakoff.

In 1982, Hill directed the sword-and-sorcery film Sorceress for Corman's New World. Various issues with the production (including filming hastily relocating to Mexico and Hill's inability to cast Sid Haig) and Corman's re-cutting of the film without his input, led Hill to remove his name from the final film, using the alias 'Brian Stuart'.

== Legacy ==
Quentin Tarantino's company Rolling Thunder Pictures re-released Switchblade Sisters theatrically in 1996. In the introduction to the film's DVD release, Tarantino calls Hill " “the Howard Hawks of exploitation filmmaking”.

Hill's discoveries include Pam Grier, who starred in four of his films from The Big Doll House through Foxy Brown; Sid Haig, who acts in most of Hill's films, beginning with Spider Baby; and Ellen Burstyn, who starred in Pit Stop.

His student film The Host was a partial influence on former classmate Francis Ford Coppola's Apocalypse Now. Hill recalled in a 2000s interview that when he made The Host,

I had been reading James Frazer ... and I had enjoyed his best-known book, The Golden Bough; in fact, my writing teacher said of 'The Host', “This is the story that Frazer forgot to tell.” It was influenced by his writing and if you see Apocalypse Now and look at the very last act of the movie, the camera explores Kurtz’s hideaway and you see a stack of books on his shelf. Very prominently featured there is The Golden Bough. When I saw the movie, my jaw dropped because Francis knew very well that my story was adapted from that. ... The third act [of Apocalypse Now] didn’t work but that was mine—that was my story [laughs]. ... John Milius wrote the script and Francis thought it was great but he did not like the ending. In fact, he didn’t come up with the right ending until he was over in the Philippines shooting it. So he knew my student film very well and I got this straight from Steve Burum, who ... was my cameraman on The Host and he was the second unit cameraman on Apocalypse Now and he said, 'We were all laughing and saying that we were doing Jack Hill’s student film.'

Film scholar Wheeler Winston Dixon believed that for Hill and fellow low-budget auteur Monte Hellman, film was primarily a means of personal expression while remaining a "deeply financially dependent medium". Dixon wrote that Hill and Hellman's movies often were sufficiently successful while remaining true to their personal vision.

== Archive ==
The moving image collection of Jack Hill is held at the Academy Film Archive. The Academy Film Archive preserved Spider Baby in 2013.

== Filmography ==
Year	Title	Functioned as					Notes
Year	Title	Dir.	Wri.	Prod.	Edit.	DoP.	Notes
1959	The Wasp Woman	Yes	No	Yes	No	No	Uncredited director of 20-minute introduction for TV syndication, shot in 1962
1961	The Host	Yes	Yes	Yes	Yes	Yes	UCLA student film
1963	The Terror	Yes	Yes	No	No	No	Uncredited director of additional scenes
1966	Mondo Keyhole	Yes	Yes	No	Yes	Yes	Co-directed with John Lamb
1966	Blood Bath	Yes	Yes	Yes	No	No	Co-directed and written with Stephanie Rothman
1967	Spider Baby	Yes	Yes	No	Yes	No	
1968	House of Evil	Yes	Yes	No	No	No	Co-directed with Luis Enrique Vergara
1968	Fear Chamber	Yes	Yes	No	No	No	Co-directed with Juan Ibáñez
1968	The Snake People	Yes	Yes	No	No	No	Co-directed with Juan Ibáñez
1968	The Incredible Invasion	Yes	No	No	No	No	Co-directed with Luis Enrique Vergara
1969	Pit Stop	Yes	Yes	No	Yes	No	
1970	Ich, ein Groupie	Yes	Yes	No	No	No	Co-directed with Erwin C. Dietrich
1971	The Big Doll House	Yes	No	No	No	No	
1972	The Big Bird Cage	Yes	Yes	No	No	No	
1973	Coffy	Yes	Yes	No	No	No	
1974	Foxy Brown	Yes	No	No	No	No	
1974	The Swinging Cheerleaders	Yes	Yes	No	No	No	
1975	Switchblade Sisters	Yes	Yes	No	No	No	
1982	Sorceress	Yes	Yes	Yes	No	No	Credited as 'Brian Stuart'

=== Writer only ===
Year	Title	Director
1972	The Woman Hunt	Eddie Romero
1978	The Bees	Alfredo Zacarías
1979	City on Fire	Alvin Rakoff
1980	Death Ship	Alvin Rakoff

=== Other production credits ===
Year	Title	Director	Notes
1962	Tonight for Sure	Francis Ford Coppola; Jerry Schafer	Director of photography
1962	Battle Beyond the Sun	Mikhail Karyukov; Aleksandr Kozyr; Francis Ford Coppola	Director of photography: US sequences
1963	The Bellboy and the Playgirls	Francis Ford Coppola; Fritz Umgelter	Editor
1963	Dementia 13	Francis Ford Coppola	2nd unit director
1965	The Raw Ones	John Lamb	Editor & director of photography
2024	Spider Baby, or The Maddest Story Ever Told	Dustin Ferguson	Executive producer
