= Austin McKinney =

American cinematographer and film editor

- Occupation(s): Cinematographer and film editor

Austin McKinney is an American cinematographer and film editor.

Austin McKinney has mentored James Cameron during his days as production design with Roger Corman in Galaxy of Terror (1981), and Jack Canon's side gig penning dozens of spy novels.

He worked along Don Jones in The Love Butcher (1975), by Mikel Angel. He had worked with David L. Hewitt, and later served as a visual effects cinematographer on Galaxy of Terror (1981), Jaws 3-D (1983), The Terminator (1984) and Night of the Comet (1984).

== Filmography ==
=== As cinematographer ===
- Bloody Brothers (2007)
- Circle of Fear (1992)
- Full Fathom Five (1990)
- Primary Target (1989)
- Lords of the Deep (1989)
- After School (1988)
- Invasion Earth: The Aliens Are Here (1988)
- Rockin' Road Trip (1985)
- The Terminator (1984)
- Night of the Comet (1984)
- Getting It On (1983)
- Jaws 3-D (1983)
- Galaxy of Terror (1983)
- Sorceress (1982)
- Slapstick of Another Kind (1982)
- Escape from New York (1981)
- Battle Beyond the Stars (1980)
- Date with a Kidnapper (1976)
- Redneck Miller (1976)
- The Love Butcher (1975)
- Axe (1974)
- Hot Summer in Barefoot County (1974)
- The Incredible Invasion (1971)
- Isle of the Snake People (1971)
- Blood of the Iron Maiden (1970)
- Dr. Masher (1969)
- Scream Free! (1969)
- From Nashville with Music (1969)
- Pit Stop (1969)
- House of Evil (1968)
- La cámara del terror (1968)
- Gallery of Horror (1967)
- Monsters Crash the Pajama Party (1965)
- The Wizard of Mars (1965)
- The Skydivers (1963)
- The Magical World of Disney (1961)
- The Noble Experiment (1955)
- Toast to Our Brother (1951)

=== As editor ===
- The Thrill Killers (1964)
- Living Between Two Worlds (1963)
- The Beast of Yucca Flats (1961)
