= The Empire of Dracula =

1967 film by Federico Curiel

- Directed by: Federico Curiel
- Screenplay by: Ramón Obón (as Ramón Obón Jr.)
- Story by: Luis Enrique Vergara (idea, as L.E. Vergara C.)
- Based on: Dracula by Bram Stoker (as Abraham Stoker)
- Produced by: Luis Enrique Vergara (as Luis Enrique Vergara C.)
- Starring: Lucha Villa; César del Campo; Eric del Castillo; Ethel Carrido; Rebeca Iturbide
- Cinematography: Alfredo Uribe
- Edited by: Luis Sobreyra
- Music by: Gustavo César Carrión
- Production company: Fílmica Vergara
- Distributed by: Columbia Pictures
- Release date: 26 October 1967 (Mexico)
- Running time: 85 minutes
- Country: Mexico
- Language: Spanish

The Empire of Dracula (Spanish: El imperio de Drácula) is a 1967 Mexican horror mystery thriller film directed by Federico Curiel and starring Lucha Villa, César del Campo, Eric del Castillo, Ethel Carrillo and Rebeca Iturbide.

It was influenced by Hammer Horror films. It is one of several vampire movies made in Mexico in the 1960s, alongside Miguel Morayta's duology, The Bloody Vampire (1962) and The Invasion of the Vampires (1963).

== Plot ==
A man searches for the vampire who killed his father to prevent him from coming back to life, but to do so he must fight his army of beautiful female vampires, who lure men to their estate so they can feed on their blood.

== Cast ==
- Lucha Villa as Patricia
- César del Campo as Luis Brener
- Eric del Castillo as Baron Draculstein (as Erick del Castillo)
- Ethel Carrillo as Diana
- Guillermo Zetina as Dr. Wilson.
- Robin Joyce as Lily
- Fernando Osés as Igor
- Víctor Alcocer as Mr. Brener, Luis's father
- Mario Orea as Police Inspector
- Rebeca Iturbide as Mrs. Brener, Luis's mother
- Altia Michel as María, maid (as Atilia Michel)
- José Dupeyrón as Chauffeur

== Reception ==
In El gran libro del vampiro ("The great book of the vampire"), Alexis Puig said, "There is a lot of eroticism, especially lesbian: female vampires biting female victims;" and highlighted a scene in which the count must fight inside his own coffin with a man carrying a crucifix as a "very dramatic scene."
