= House of Evil =

1972 film directed by Luis Enrique Vergara and Jack Hill

- Mexican theatrical poster
- Directed by: Luis Enrique Vergara; Jack Hill
- Screenplay by: Luis Enrique Vergara
- Produced by: Juan Ibáñez; Luis Enrique Vergara
- Starring: Boris Karloff; Julissa; Andrés García; José Ángel Espinoza
- Cinematography: Raúl Domínguez; Austin McKinney
- Edited by: Ángel Camacho
- Music by: Enrico C. Cabiati; Alicia Urreta
- Production companies: Azteca Films; Filmica Vergara S.A.
- Distributed by: Columbia Pictures (US)
- Release date: 1972 (US)
- Running time: 89 minutes
- Country: Mexico
- Language: English

House of Evil (Spanish: Serenata macabra, lit. 'Macabre Serenade', also released as Dance of Death) is a 1972 Mexican horror film directed by Luis Enrique Vergara and Jack Hill, and starring Boris Karloff, Julissa, Andrés García and José Ángel Espinoza.

This was the first in a cycle of four films Karloff made in a package deal with Mexican producer Luis Enrique Vergara. The others are Isle of the Snake People, The Incredible Invasion, and Fear Chamber. Karloff's scenes for all four films were directed by Hill in Los Angeles in the spring of 1968, while the rest of the films were completed in Mexico without either's involvement.

House of Evil was released theatrically in 1972, three years after Karloff's death.

== Plot ==
Morhenge Mansion, 1900. The dying Matthias Morteval invites his dysfunctional relatives to his home for a will reading. However, he dies, and soon the relatives are being murdered one by one by his robotic toys that are alive.

== Cast ==
- Boris Karloff as Matthias Morteval
- Julissa as Lucy Durant
- Andrés García as Beasley
- José Ángel Espinoza as Dr. Emery Horvath
- Beatriz Baz as Cordelia Rash
- Quintín Bulnes as Ivar Morteval
- Manuel Alvarado as Morgenstein Morteval
- Arturo Fernández as Professor Frank

== See also ==
- Killer toys
