= Fear Chamber =

- Theatrical release poster
- Directed by: Juan Ibáñez (Mexican scenes); Jack Hill (U.S. scenes)
- Screenplay by: Jack Hill; Luis Enrique Vergara
- Produced by: Luis Enrique Vergara
- Starring: Boris Karloff
- Cinematography: Raúl Domínguez; Austin McKinney
- Edited by: Felipe Marino
- Music by: Enrico C. Cabiati
- Production companies: Azteca Films; Filmica Vergara S.A.
- Distributed by: Columbia Pictures
- Release date: 1971
- Running time: 88 minutes
- Country: Mexico
- Language: English

Fear Chamber (La camara del terror/ The Room of Terror), also released as The Torture Zone, is a 1971 Mexican horror film directed by Juan Ibáñez and starring Boris Karloff and Julissa. It was filmed in May 1968, but was only released theatrically in 1971, 2 years after Karloff had died.

Fear Chamber is one of four low-budget Mexican horror films Karloff made in a package deal with Mexican producer Luis Enrique Vergara. The others are Isle of the Snake People, The Incredible Invasion, and House of Evil. Karloff's scenes for all four films were directed by Jack Hill in Los Angeles in the spring of 1968. The films were then completed in Mexico.

== Plot ==
Scientists discover a living rock beneath a volcano. It feeds on the adrenaline of frightened young women, so the scientists construct a fear chamber and kidnap young girls to feed the creature.

== Cast ==
- Boris Karloff as Dr. Carl Mandel
- Julissa as Corinne Mandel
- Carlos East as Mark
- Isela Vega as Helga
- Yerye Beirute as Roland
- Santanón – Midget
