= The Border Man =

1952 film

- Directed by: Miguel M. Delgado
- Screenplay by: Eduardo Galindo; Ramón Pérez Peláez
- Produced by: Alberto Galindo
- Starring: Alma Rosa Aguirre; Raúl Martínez; Andrés Soler
- Cinematography: Víctor Herrera
- Edited by: Jorge Bustos
- Music by: Gonzalo Curiel
- Production company: Producciones Galindo Hermanos
- Distributed by: Clasa-Mohme
- Release date: 12 September 1952
- Running time: 84 minutes
- Country: Mexico
- Language: Spanish

The Border Man (Spanish: El fronterizo) is a 1952 Mexican western comedy film directed by Miguel M. Delgado and starring Alma Rosa Aguirre, Raúl Martínez, Andrés Soler, Domingo Soler and Tito Junco. The film's sets were designed by the art director Ramón Rodríguez Granada.

== Cast ==
- Alma Rosa Aguirre as Virginia
- Raúl Martínez as El fronterizo
- Andrés Soler as Don Sostenes
- Domingo Soler as Pablo
- Tito Junco as Panchito
- Agustín Isunza as Federico
- Fernando Casanova as Fernando
- Alfredo Varela as Mario
- Conchita Gentil Arcos as Tía Mechita
- José Muñoz as Antonio
- Salvador Quiroz as Juez
- Altia Michel as Linda

== Bibliography ==
- Dear, Michael & Leclerc, Gustavo. Postborder City: Cultural Spaces of Bajalta California. Routledge, 122013.
- Flores, Lori A. Grounds for Dreaming: Mexican Americans, Mexican Immigrants, and the California Farmworker Movement. Yale University Press, 2016.
