= Altia Michel =

Mexican Singer and Dancer

- Born: 1929; Mexico City, Mexico
- Died: 1994 (aged 64–65); Mexico City
- Other name: Althia Mitchel
- Spouse: Gualberto Castro (m. 1954; div. 1959)
- Children: Altia Castro Michel

Altia Herrera Michel (1929–1994), also credited as Althia Michel, was a Mexican singer, dancer and film actress.

== Life and career ==
Altia Herrera Michel was born in Mexico City. Due to her physical beauty and height—5 foot 8 inches, she was cast in movies as a sex symbol and quickly became "type-cast" as a femme fatale.

Michel began her career singing in nightclubs and theaters, where she performed many times with Russian – Mexican controversial violinist Elias Breeskin who had been released from a thirteen-year incarceration at Islas Marías Federal Prison on the Islas Marías archipelago off the coast of Nayarit, where he had shared a cell with Ramón Mercader, the Spanish born communist who had worked as a Soviet agent in 1940 to assassinate Leon Trotsky. Breeskin, had been married before, and from his marriages he fathered six children. Of his offspring, Olga Breeskin followed her father's footsteps into music. Michel was discovered through her nightclub and theater performances and signed to a movie contract in 1952. Her first movie role was in "El fronterizo," a comedy western.

Of the ten movies that she appeared in, several have become cult classics; most notably the 1967 film entitled "The Empire of Dracula." An adaptation of Bram Stoker's novel the screen play written by Luis Enrique Vergara, starring Eric de Castillo as Baron Draculstein, the part of Diana portrayed by Ethel Carrillo, and Michel played Atilia Michel, a beautiful vampire who tried to lure Luis Brener, performed by César del Campo, into the Dracula's castle with the intent to feed on his blood.

In 1958, she participated in one of the first Mexican movies filmed in color entitled "Música de siempre." The National Association of Actors financed the film in order to give jobs to hundreds of actors, actresses, musicians, stagehands, grips, soundmen, writers and more who became unemployed from Mexico City Regent Ernesto P. Uruchurtu's siege on the entertainment industry. Michel played the part of an announcer of a commercial that sold egg-based hair shampoo.

The era of professional wrestling brought to the movie screen the Mexican super hero films that included Mil Máscaras, Demonio Azul and Santo movies. Michel appeared in the "Demonio Azul" produced by Luis Enrique Vergara, starring Demonio Azul a.k.a. Alejandro Munoz Moreno in 1965. El Santo made several films for Vergara, but after a contractual dispute, he walked off the set. The producer did not hesitate to come up with another wrestler to take El Santo's place. He invented "El Demonio Azul" or the Blue Demon. In the film "Blue Demon," Michel played the part of a flirtatious sensual waitress who is murdered by a werewolf.

In 1969 she again appeared in a cult classic wrestling movie entitled "Mil Máscaras," produced by Luis Enrique Vergara and starring Aaron Rodriguez. Horror movies became popular during the late 1960s. Michel appeared in "Atacan las brujas" and "Los canallas" both produced by Luis Enrique Vergara in 1968.

After film producer Luis Enrique Vergara died from a heart attack in 1969, Michel did not appear in any other movies. She continued to perform in nightclubs and theaters throughout Mexico and in the border towns in the United States.

== Personal life ==
Michel married singer Gualberto Castro in 1954, together they had one daughter in 1958. They divorced in 1959.

== Death ==
As a lifetime smoker, Michel died from complications of lung disease in 1994.

== Filmography ==
- The Border Man (1952), comedy-western
- La alegre casada (1952), comedy released on 1952
- Escuela para suegras (School for Mothers-in-Law) (1958)
- Música de siempre (1958) produced by the A.N.D.A.
- Blue Demon, el demonio azul (1965) produced by Luis Enrique Vergara starring Alejandro Munoz Moreno
- The Empire of Dracula (1967), screenplay by Luis Enrique Vergara
- Atacan las brujas (1968) produced by Luis Enrique Vergara
- Los canallas (The Scoundrels) (1968); aka "The Swine", "Hell's Angels" or "Angeles Infernales"; produced by Luis Enrique Vergara
- Mil Máscaras (1969) director Jaime Salvador, starring Aaron Rodriguez as Mil Máscaras, and Eric de Castillo
- Enigma de muerte (Enigma of Death) (1969) (co-starring John Carradine)
