= The Adolescents (1968 film) =

1968 film

- Directed by: Abel Salazar
- Written by: José María Fernández Unsáin; Juan Ibáñez
- Produced by: Abel Salazar
- Starring: Luis Aragón
- Cinematography: Fernando Colín
- Release date: 2 February 1968
- Running time: 100 minutes
- Country: Mexico
- Language: Spanish

The Adolescents (Spanish: Los adolescentes) is a 1968 Mexican drama film directed by Abel Salazar. The film was selected as the Mexican entry for Best Foreign Language Film at the 40th Academy Awards, but was not accepted as a nominee.

== Cast ==
- Luis Aragón as Rafael
- Sandra Boyd
- Ismael Camacho
- Elizabeth Dupeyrón
- Carlos Fernandez as Raúl
- Lucy Gallardo as Lala
- Julissa as María
- Claudia Martell
- Carmen Montejo as Lucía
- Alfonso Munguía
- Carlos Navarro as Mauricio
- Julián Pastor as Ramón
- Carlos Piñar as Juan
- Renata Seydel as Kikis

== See also ==
- List of submissions to the 40th Academy Awards for Best Foreign Language Film
- List of Mexican submissions for the Academy Award for Best Foreign Language Film
