= Pit Stop (1969 film) =

1969 film by Jack Hill

- U.S. film poster
- Directed by: Jack Hill
- Written by: Jack Hill
- Produced by: Lee Strosnider
- Starring: Brian Donlevy; Richard Davalos; Ellen Burstyn; Sid Haig; Beverly Washburn
- Cinematography: Austin McKinney
- Edited by: Jack Hill
- Music by: The Daily Flash; John Fridge
- Production company: Jack Hill Productions
- Distributed by: Crown International Pictures; Goldstone Film Enterprises
- Release date: May 14, 1969 (San Francisco)
- Running time: 92 minutes
- Country: United States
- Language: English
- Budget: $75,000

Pit Stop is a 1969 American sports action-drama film written, directed, and edited by Jack Hill, and starring Brian Donlevy (in his final film role), Richard Davalos, Ellen Burstyn, Sid Haig and Beverly Washburn. It is set in the world of Figure 8 stock car racing. It was released by Crown International Pictures on May 14, 1969.

The film has come to be regarded as one of Hill's best, and has developed a cult following.

== Plot ==
Rick Bowman, a brash, hustling, opportunistic amateur drag racer, is courted by affluent Grant Willard, who wants him to participate in his burgeoning Figure 8 stock car racing competitions, where the driving pattern guarantees crashes and injuries.

Rick quickly starts trying to undermine a popular star of Willard's races, Hawk Sidney, who is prone to over-the-top boasting and taunts. Rick succeeds in defeating him, and wooing away Jolene, a groupie he had been keeping time with. Initially, Hawk reacts violently, destroying Rick's car after a race and beating him up. However, the two men ultimately come to a respectful truce.

Rick then sets his sights on besting the comparably calm and conservative champion Ed McCleod, whose wife Ellen frequently helps with the upkeep of his car, but is clearly feeling neglected. Willard encourages Rick's ambitious desire to win, even though it endangers Hawk and Ed. Rick proposes a big challenge to a driver from a rival organization, initially suggesting it as a showcase for all of his drivers, and at a beach party before the race, Rick and Ellen share intimacy.

On the day of the race, Willard states that as long as his team wins, it doesn't matter whether the win is taken by Rick or Ed, tacitly approving him showing up the veteran. Hawk is quickly eliminated, and Ed has a crash that he initially walks away from, setting the stage for Rick to win. However, no one from the team is present to congratulate Rick, as they have gone to the hospital where Ed has been taken. When Rick arrives there, he learns that by walking to the ambulance under his own power, instead of allowing paramedics to handle him, lingering whiplash from the wreck broke Ed's neck, and he has died.

Willard proposes Rick take Ed's place in an upcoming high-profile race, and Rick accepts, even though he sees that Hawk, Ellen, and Jolene have now lost respect for him.

== Cast ==
- Brian Donlevy as Grant Willard
- Richard Davalos (as Dick Davalos) as Rick Bowman
- Ellen Burstyn (as Ellen McRae) as Ellen McLeod
- George Washburn as Ed McLeod
- Sid Haig as "Hawk" Sidney
- Beverly Washburn as Jolene
- Steve Pendleton as Luther
- Robert Krist as Al
- Ted Duncan as Sonny Simpson
- Titus Moede as Moody
- Don White as Ace
- Ray Thiel as Roy
- George Barris as himself

== Production ==
The original title was The Winner but it had to be retitled when Winning was released. It was retitled Pit Stop even though there is no pit stop in the film. Jack Hill saw figure 8 racing and he thought it was so "crazy and so loony" he wanted to document it. Shooting took place in and around Los Angeles in 1967. Roger Corman was an uncredited executive producer. This was the final acting role of Hollywood veteran Brian Donlevy, before his death in 1972.

Although the soundtrack is credited to Seattle psychedelic band The Daily Flash, the group had already disbanded before the film's production. It should actually be credited to the post-Daily Flash project Two Guitars, Piano, Drum & Darryl.

== Release and reception ==
The film was distributed by Crown International Pictures and Goldstone Film Enterprises, and released on a double bill with Naked Angels. According to Hill, the film being shot in black-and-white hurt its commercial prospects. Nonetheless, it has developed a cult following.
