= Juan Ibáñez =

Mexican film director

Juan Ibáñez (April 20, 1938 – September 12, 2000) was a Mexican actor, film director, producer and writer. He was born in Guanajuato, Guanajuato and died in Mexico City.

His films include The Outsiders (1967) an adaptation of a novel by Juan Rulfo, a film that received critical acclaim and various awards and nominations at the Diosas de Plata 1968.

== Filmography ==
- Un alma pura, (1965) writer, director, featurette, adaptation of a story by Carlos Fuentes second segment in Los bienamados a film that also contains Tajimara, adaptation of a story by Juan García Ponce, directed by Juan José Gurrola
- Los caifanes (a.k.a. The Outsiders) (1967) writer, director
- Fear Chamber (1968) co-director
- House of Evil (1968) co-director
- The Adolescents (1968) writer
- The Incredible Invasion (a.k.a. Alien Terror) (1971) co-director
- La generala (1971) writer, director
- Isle of the Snake People (1971) writer, co-director (as Jhon Ibanez)
- A fuego lento/México nocturno (1977) writer, director
- Divinas palabras (1978) writer, director

== Theater ==
- Olimpica, staging director
