= Karloff (play) =

Play written by Randy Bowser

Karloff The Play
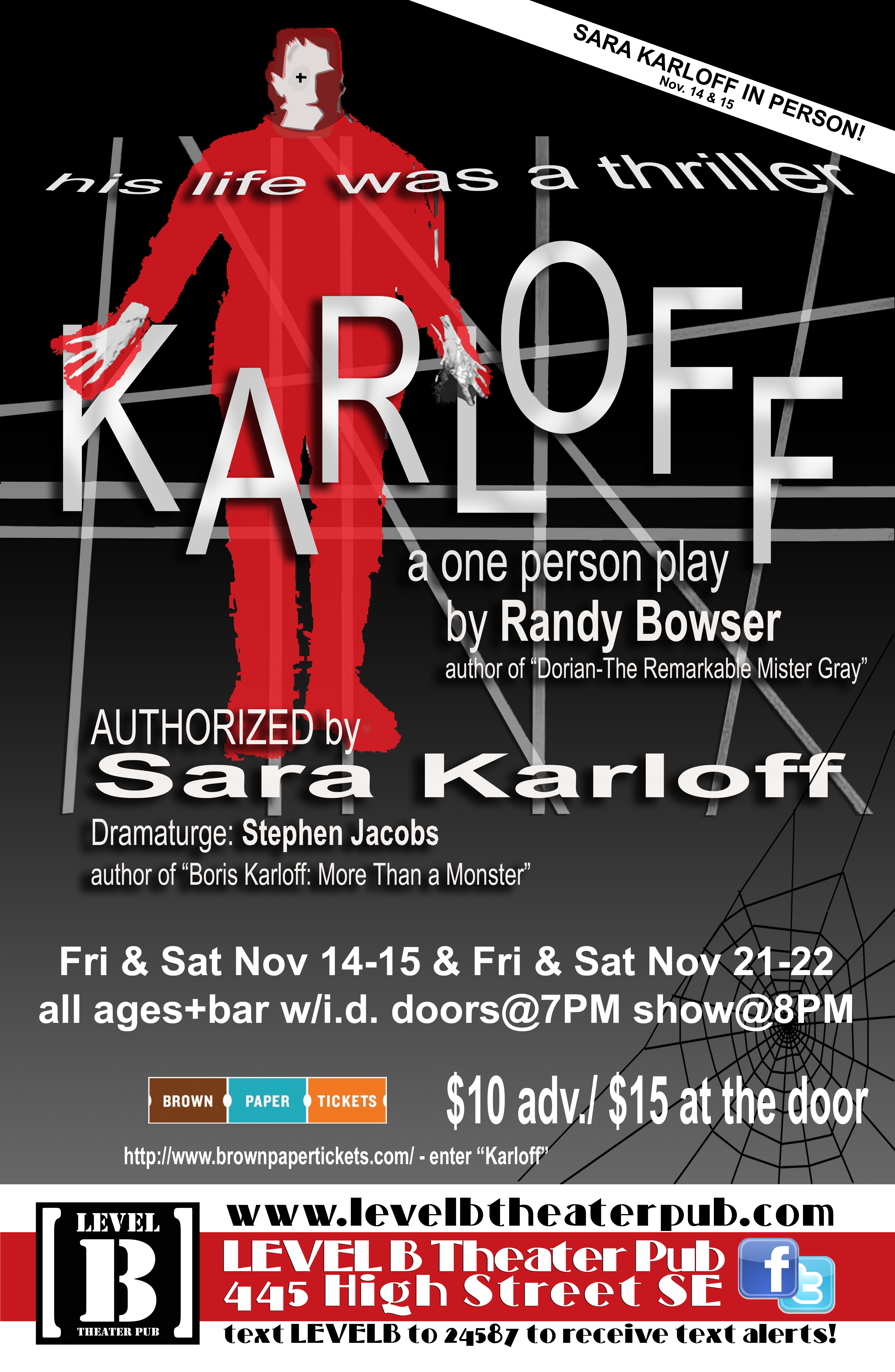
- Original poster for KARLOFF The Play
- Original language: English
- Written by: Randy Bowser
- Characters: Boris Karloff
- Genre: one-person play, biographical comedy/drama

Premiere
- Date: November 14, 2014
- Place: Level B Theater Pub, Salem, OR
- Official website

Karloff is a biographical one-man play about the life of film star Boris Karloff, written by Randy Bowser.

Using quotes from Boris Karloff, both humorous and serious, on a wide range of topics, the play is a jigsaw puzzle of brief, non-chronologically enacted events in the actor's life. The theme is self-realization. The subject is the art of acting. The story is how William Henry Pratt, whose stage name was Boris Karloff, overcomes physical and cultural handicaps to become an unlikely success in his chosen field of acting by making the most of an equally unlikely opportunity when he's cast in the role of a monster. The central metaphor is The Frankenstein Monster trying to grasp light when he first sees it, representing Boris, and all of God's bumbling creatures, trying to reach and understand more than they are capable of comprehending.

The play premiered in Salem, Oregon, November 14, 2014, at Level B Theater Pub. Boris Karloff's only child, Sara Jane Karloff, attended both performances of the show's opening weekend. The play was developed with Stephen Jacobs , author of the biography Boris Karloff: More Than a Monster," as the script's dramaturg.

Bowser performed the role of Boris in the premiere, but did not develop the piece as a personal vehicle, but rather as a play open for the general theatre market to all interested producers. A second production ran during October 2016, at the Alliance Performance Center of Tucson, AZ. Charles Prokopp played Boris, and the production was directed by John R. Gunn.

The play ran live, and in online streaming, from October 16 through October 31, 2021, at Anchorage Community Theatre in Alaska. The production was presented in honor of Boris Karloff who guest-starred in the group's 1957 production of "Arsenic and Old Lace," the play which was a big success for Mr. Karloff on Broadway.

Prime Stage Theatre in Pittsburgh, PA, produced KARLOFF in November 2021 for both on-stage performances and On-Demand streaming performances. This version of the play was a one-act with the sub-title "The Man and The Monster." The show was reviewed in OnStage Pittsburgh.

The initial production of the play was funded by a successful Kickstarter crowdfunding campaign. The Kickstarter page for Karloff is still maintained, and is an archive of photos, promotions and blog entries.
