= Boris Karloff =

English actor (1887–1969)

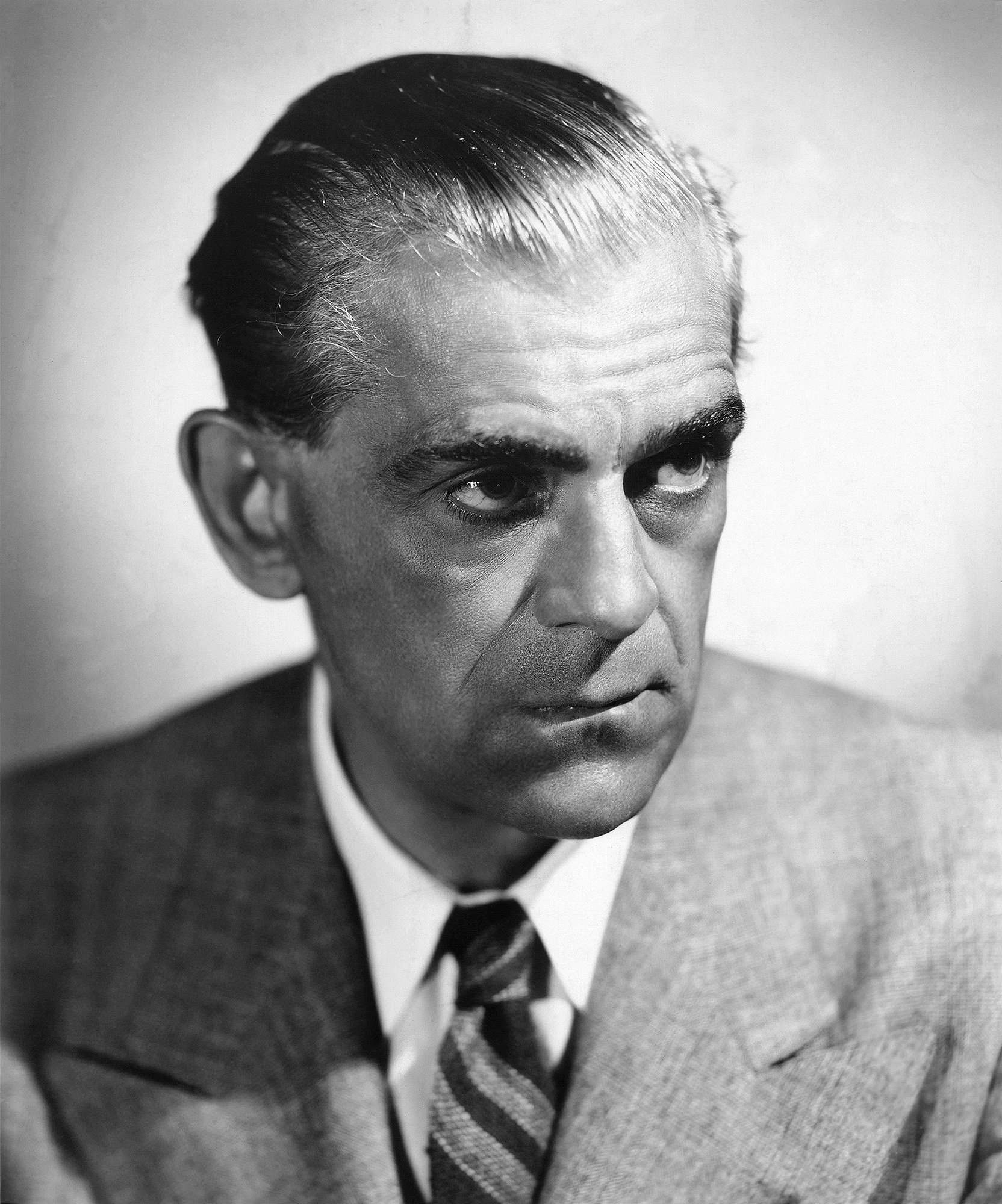
- Karloff c. 1940s
- Born: William Henry Pratt; 23 November 1887; Dulwich, London, England
- Died: 2 February 1969 (aged 81); Midhurst, Sussex, England
- Resting place: Guildford Crematorium, Godalming, Surrey, England
- Education: King's College London
- Occupation: Actor
- Years active: 1911–1968
- Spouses: Grace Harding (m. 1910; div. 1913) Olive de Wilton (m. 1916; div. 1919) Montana Laurena Williams (m. 1920; div. 1922) Helene Vivian Soule (m. 1924; div. 1928) Dorothy Stine (m. 1930; div. 1946) Evelyn Hope Helmore (m. 1946)
- Children: 1
- Relatives: Anna Leonowens (great-aunt); Louis T. Leonowens (first cousin once removed)

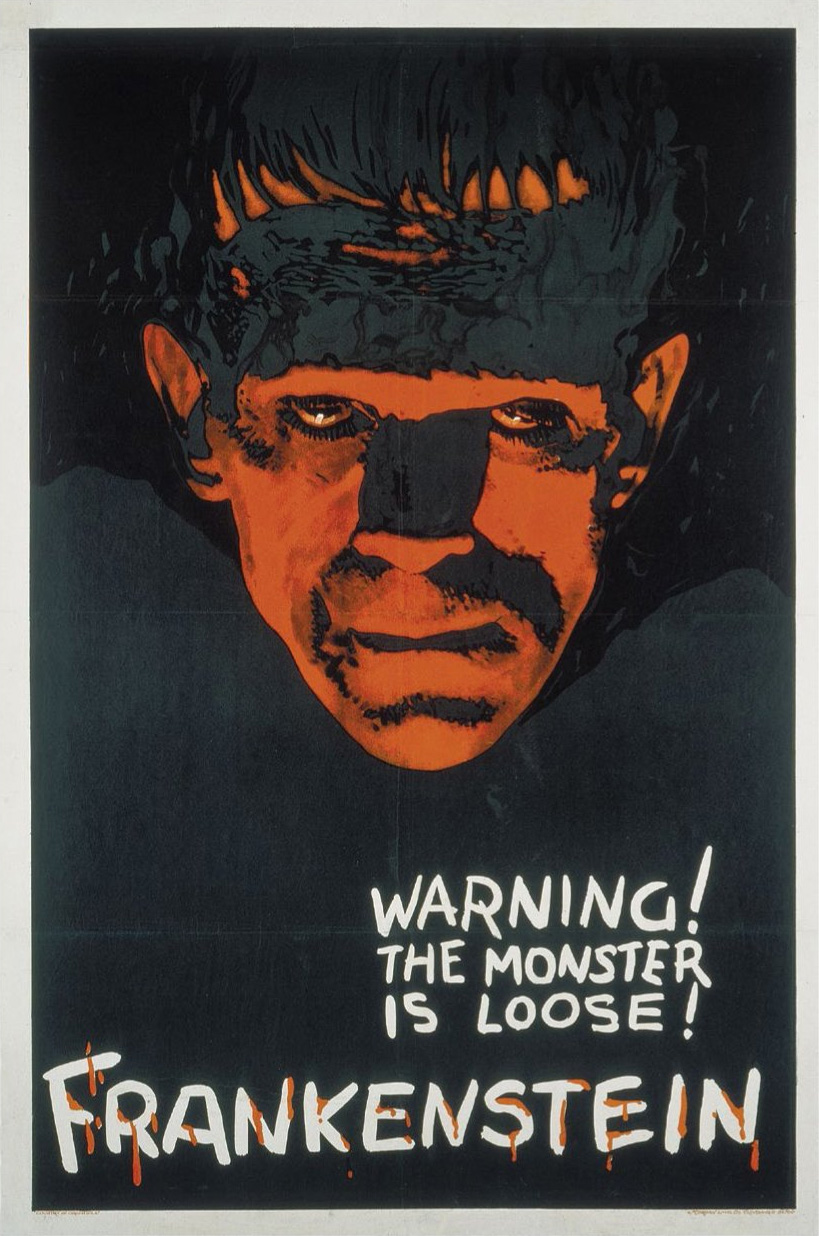
Theatrical teaser poster

William Henry Pratt (23 November 1887 – 2 February 1969), known professionally as Boris Karloff (/ˈkɑːrlɒf/), was an English actor. His portrayal of Frankenstein's monster in the horror film Frankenstein (1931), his 82nd film, established him as a horror icon, and he reprised the role for the sequels Bride of Frankenstein (1935) and Son of Frankenstein (1939). He also appeared as Imhotep in The Mummy (1932), and voiced the Grinch in, as well as narrating, the animated television special of Dr. Seuss' How the Grinch Stole Christmas! (1966), which won him a Grammy Award.

Aside from his numerous film roles (174 films), Karloff acted in many live stage plays and appeared on dozens of radio and television programs as well. For his contribution to film and television, Karloff was awarded two stars on the Hollywood Walk of Fame on 8 February 1960.

== Early life ==
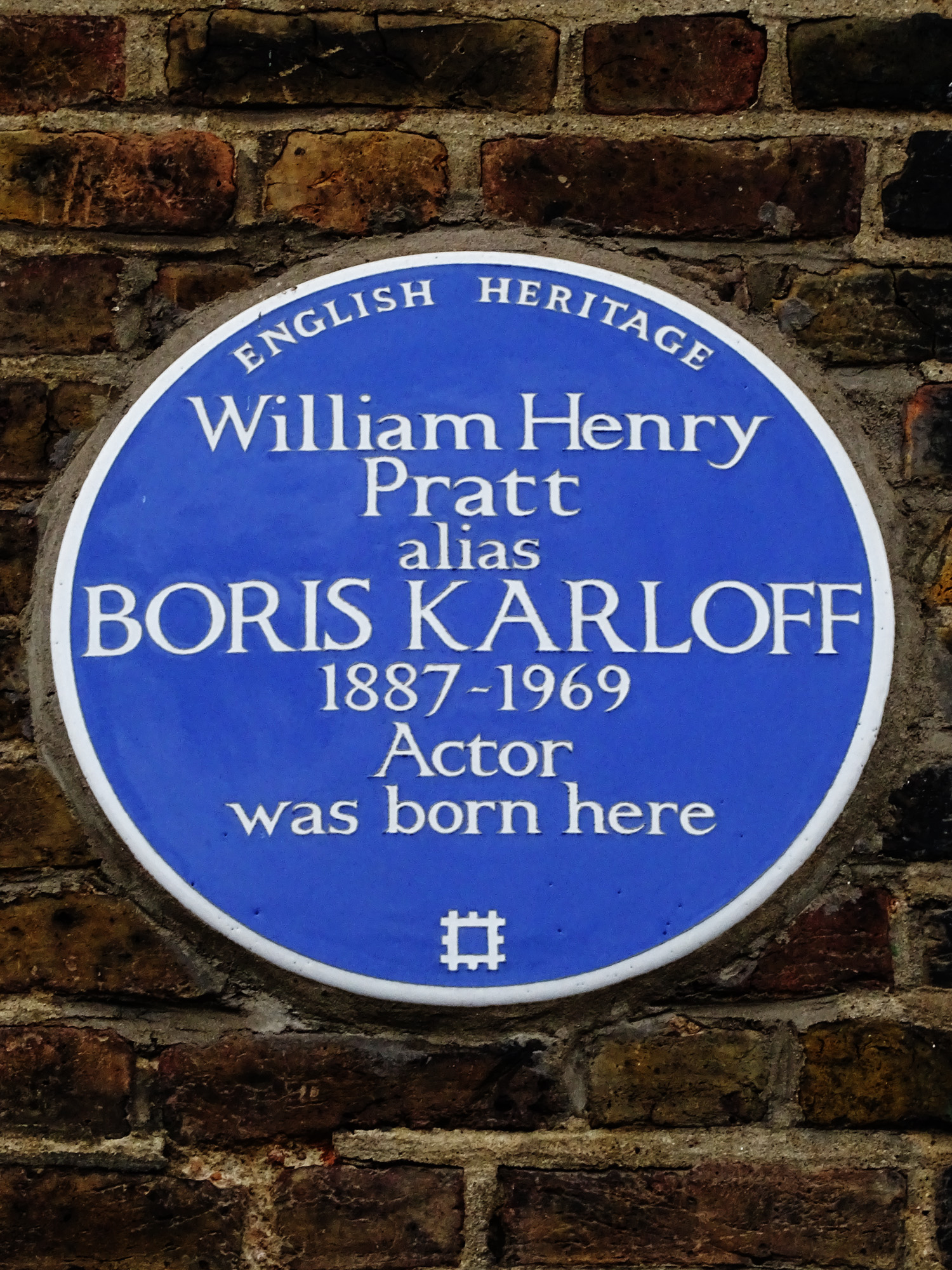
English Heritage blue plaque at 36 Forest Hill Road, East Dulwich, London, marking Karloff's birthplace

William Henry Pratt was born on 23 November 1887, at 36 Forest Hill Road, East Dulwich, London. His parents were Edward John Pratt of the Indian Civil Service (where he worked for the salt revenue service), and his wife Eliza Sara Millard. Both his parents died when Karloff was young, and he was primarily raised by a half-sister and his elder siblings. His brother Sir John Thomas Pratt was a British consul-general in China, while two other brothers, Frederick Greville Pratt and Edward Millard Pratt, followed their father into the Indian Civil Service. Their father, Edward John Pratt, was an Anglo-Indian, with a British father and an Indian mother, and Karloff was more than a quarter Indian, as his mother also had some Indian ancestry; Karloff had a complexion darker than that of most of his peers. His mother's maternal aunt was Anna Leonowens, whose tales about life in the royal court of Siam (now Thailand) were the basis of the novel Anna and the King of Siam. Pratt was bow-legged, had a lisp, and stuttered as a young boy. He learned how to manage his stutter, but not his lisp, which was noticeable throughout his career in the film industry.

Pratt spent his childhood years in Enfield, in the County of Middlesex. He was the youngest of nine children, and following his mother's death was brought up by his elder siblings. After first attending Enfield Grammar School in London, he received a private education at Uppingham School and Merchant Taylors' School, which was then occupying the London Charterhouse. Following this, he attended King's College London, where his studies were aimed at a career with the British Government's Consular Service. However, in 1909, he left university without graduating and drifted, departing England on a ship for Canada. There, he worked as a farm labourer and truck driver and did various odd jobs in Saskatchewan and British Columbia until he happened upon stage acting in Prince Albert, Saskatchewan, which eventually led to a later film career.

== Professional career ==
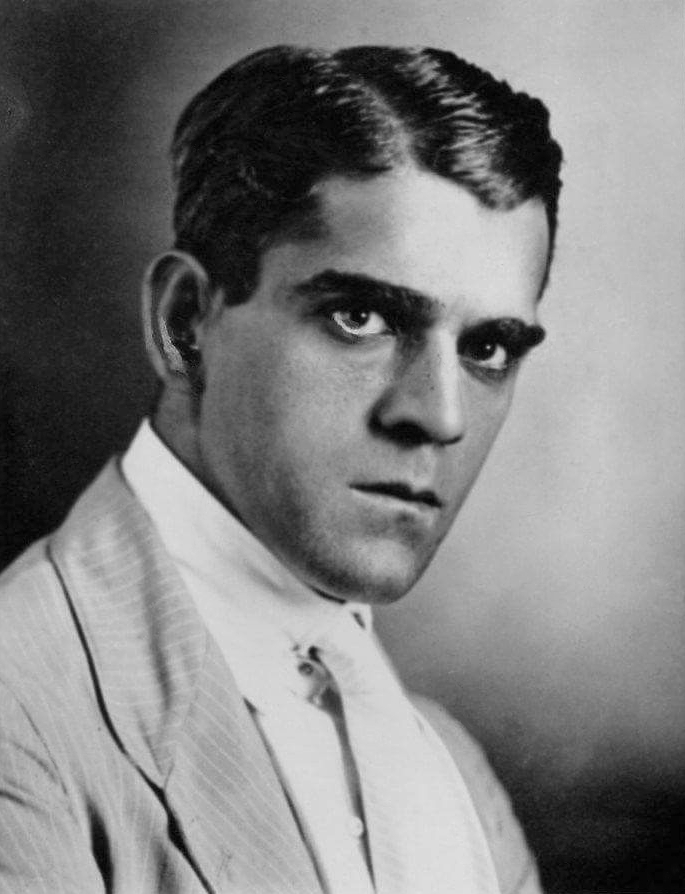
Karloff at age 26 in 1913

=== Adoption of stage name ===
Pratt began appearing in theatrical performances in Canada in 1911. He was present in Regina, Saskatchewan, in June 1912, the day the Regina Cyclone destroyed much of the city. The theatre group he was with gave a benefit performance that night at the Regina Theatre to assist in relief efforts. The next week, appearing in Saskatoon, they donated half of the receipts from their performances to Regina relief.

During this period, he chose Boris Karloff as his stage name. Karloff always said he chose the first name "Boris" simply because it sounded foreign and exotic, and that "Karloff" was a family name. Karloff's daughter, Sara, publicly denied any knowledge of Slavic forebears, "Karloff" or otherwise. It has been speculated by film historians that he took the stage name from a mad scientist character named "Boris Karlov" in the novel The Drums of Jeopardy by Harold MacGrath, but the novel was not published until 1920, at least eight years after Karloff had been using the name on stage and in films. (Warner Oland played "Boris Karlov" in a film version in 1931.) Another possible influence was thought to be a character in the Edgar Rice Burroughs fantasy novel The Rider, which features a "Prince Boris of Karlova", but, because the novel was not published until 1915, the influence may be backward, that Burroughs saw Karloff in a play and adapted the name for the character.

One reason for the name change was to prevent embarrassment to the Pratt family. Whether or not his brothers, all dignified members of the Indian Civil Service or His Majesty's Diplomatic Service, actually considered young William the "black sheep of the family" for having become an actor, Karloff worried they felt that way. He did not reunite with his brothers until he returned to Britain to make The Ghoul (1933), worried that they would disapprove of his new, macabre claim to world fame. Instead, his brothers jostled for position around him and happily posed for publicity photographs upon their reunion with him. After the photo was taken, the brothers immediately started asking about getting copies of their own. The story of the photo became one of Karloff's favorites.

=== Canadian and American stage work ===
Karloff joined the Jeanne Russell Company in 1911 and performed in towns including Kamloops (British Columbia) and Prince Albert (Saskatchewan). After the devastating tornado in Regina on 30 June 1912, Karloff, who was in the midst of an engagement at the Regina Theatre, and other performers helped with clean-up efforts. He later took a job as a railway baggage handler and joined the Harry St. Clair Company that performed in Minot, North Dakota, for a year in an opera house above a hardware store.

While he was trying to establish his acting career, Karloff had to perform years of manual labour in Canada and the United States to make ends meet. Among this work, he spent one year laying track, digging ditches, shovelling coal, clearing land, and working with surveying parties for the B.C. Electric Railway Company, at the rate of $2.50 per day. From this gruelling work with the BCER and other employers, Karloff was left with back problems for the rest of his life; because of his health, he did not serve in World War I.

During this period, Karloff worked in various theatrical stock companies across the U.S. to hone his acting skills, including with the Harry St. Clair Players and the Billie Bennett Touring Company. By early 1918, he was working with the Maud Amber Players in Vallejo, California, but because of the Spanish flu outbreak in the San Francisco area and the fear of infection, the troupe was disbanded. He was able to find work with the Haggerty Repertory for a while (according to the 1973 obituary of Joseph Paul Haggerty, he and Boris Karloff remained lifelong friends).

=== Early Hollywood career ===
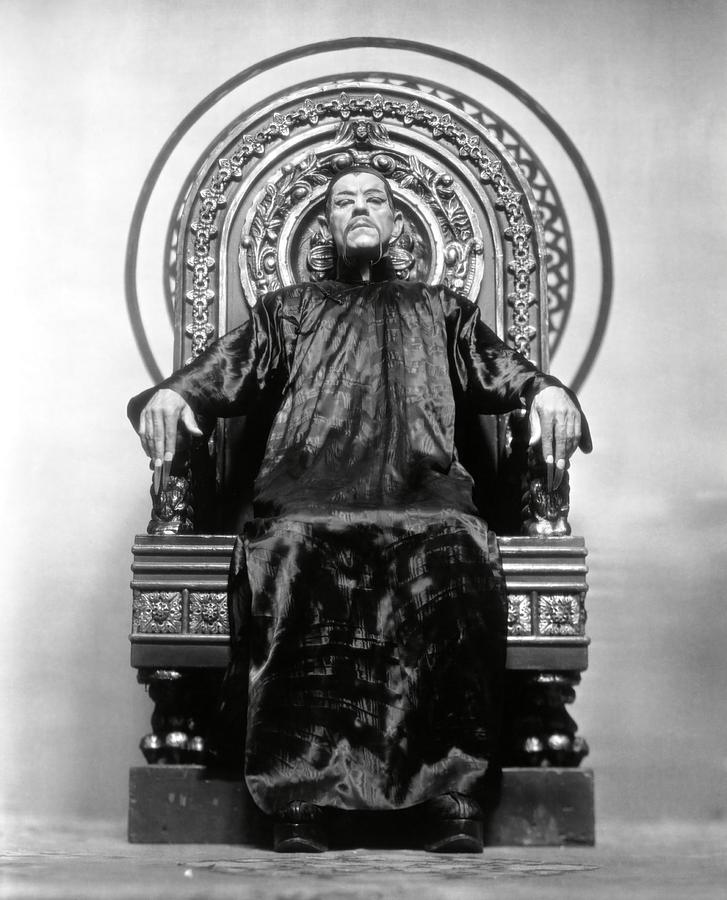
Karloff as Fu Manchu in The Mask of Fu Manchu (1932).

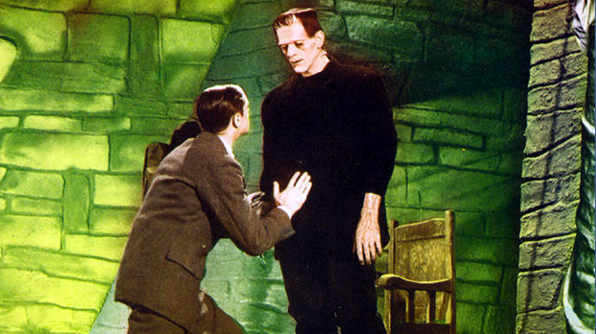
Colin Clive and Karloff in Frankenstein (1931). Cropped and edited lobby card

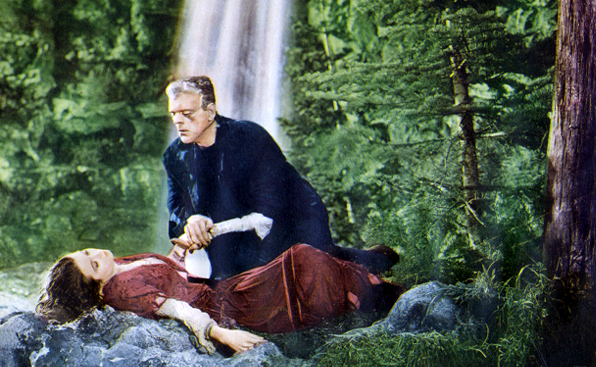
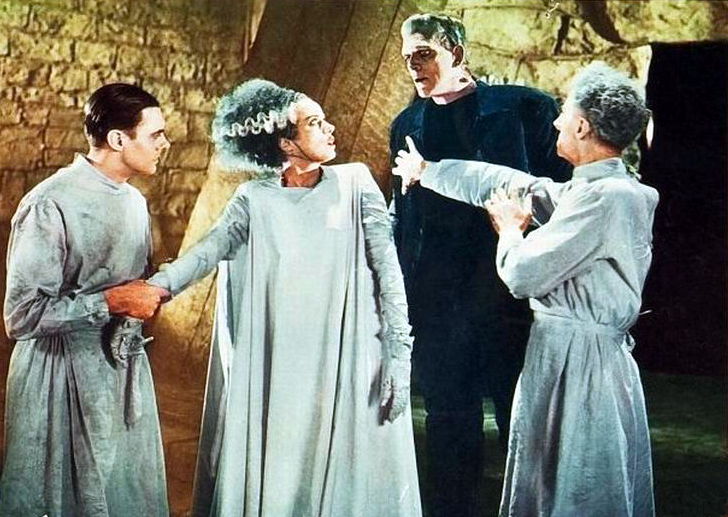
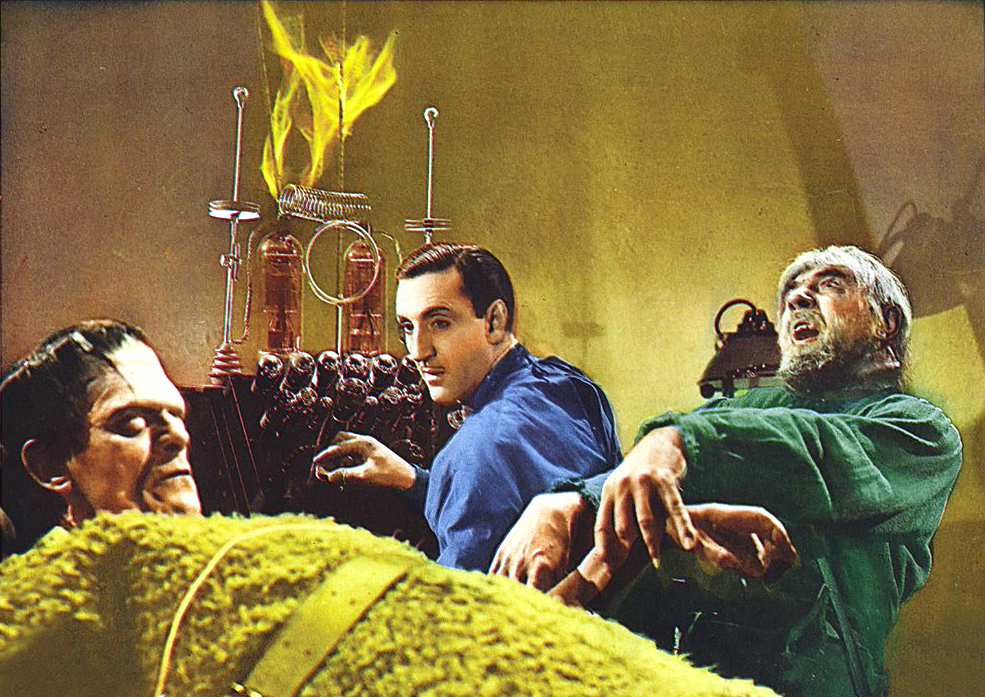
Top image: Karloff in Bride of Frankenstein (1935)
Center image: Colin Clive, Elsa Lanchester, Karloff and Ernest Thesiger in Bride of Frankenstein
Bottom image: Karloff, Basil Rathbone and Bela Lugosi in Son of Frankenstein (1939)
Cropped and edited lobby cards

Once Karloff arrived in Hollywood, he appeared in small roles in dozens of silent films, but the work was sporadic and he often had to take up manual labour such as digging ditches or delivering construction plaster to make ends meet. (According to Karloff, his first film was a Frank Borzage picture at Universal for which he received $5 as an extra; the title of this film has never been traced.)

His first certain screen role was in a film serial, The Lightning Raider (1919) with Pearl White. He was in another serial that same year, The Masked Rider (1919), the earliest of his film appearances that has survived. Karloff could also be seen in His Majesty, the American (1919) with Douglas Fairbanks, The Prince and Betty (1919), The Deadlier Sex (1920) with Blanche Sweet, and The Courage of Marge O'Doone (1920). He played an Indian in The Last of the Mohicans (1920) with Wallace Beery and he would often be cast as an Arab or Indian in his early films.

Karloff's first major role came in a film serial, The Hope Diamond Mystery (1920). He was Indian in Without Benefit of Clergy (1921) and an Arab in Cheated Hearts (1921) and villainous biracial hired hand in The Cave Girl (1921). He was a maharajah in The Man from Downing Street (1922), a Nabob in The Infidel (1922) and had roles in The Altar Stairs (1922), Omar the Tentmaker (1922) (as an Imam), The Woman Conquers (1922), The Gentleman from America (1923), The Prisoner (1923) and the serial Riders of the Plains (1923).

Karloff did a Western, The Hellion (1923), and a drama, Dynamite Dan (1924). He could be seen in Parisian Nights (1925), Forbidden Cargo (1925), The Prairie Wife (1925) and the serial Perils of the Wild (1925). Karloff went back to bit part status in Never the Twain Shall Meet (1925), directed by Maurice Tourneur, but he had a good support part in Lady Robinhood (1925) starring Evelyn Brent in the titular role.

Karloff went on to be in The Greater Glory (1926), Her Honor, the Governor (1926), The Bells (1926) (as a mesmerist), The Nickel-Hopper (1926) with Mabel Normand, The Golden Web (1926), The Eagle of the Sea (1926), Flames (1926), Old Ironsides (1926) with Wallace Beery and Esther Ralston, Flaming Fury (1926), Valencia (1926), The Man in the Saddle (1926) with Hoot Gibson, Tarzan and the Golden Lion (1927) (as an African), Let It Rain (1927), The Meddlin' Stranger (1927), The Princess from Hoboken (1927), The Phantom Buster (1927) with Buddy Roosevelt, and Soft Cushions (1927).

Karloff had roles in Two Arabian Knights (1927), The Love Mart (1927) with Noah Beery Sr., The Vanishing Rider (1928) (a serial), Burning the Wind (1928), Vultures of the Sea (1928), and The Little Wild Girl (1928).

He was in The Devil's Chaplain (1929), The Fatal Warning (1929) for Richard Thorpe, The Phantom of the North (1929), Two Sisters (1929), Anne Against the World (1929), Behind That Curtain (1929) with Warner Baxter, and The King of the Kongo (1929), a serial directed by Thorpe.

One day while he was sitting at a bus stop in the pouring rain, Lon Chaney Sr., 'The Man of a Thousand Faces', spotted Karloff and offered him a ride. Chaney told him to "find something different that will set you apart and is different from anything someone else has done or is willing to do and do it better".

Karloff had an uncredited bit part in The Unholy Night (1930) directed by Lionel Barrymore, and bigger parts in The Bad One (1930), The Sea Bat (1930) starring Charles Bickford and directed by Lionel Barrymore and Wesley Ruggles, and The Utah Kid (1930) directed by Thorpe.

A film which brought Karloff recognition was The Criminal Code (1931), a prison drama directed by Howard Hawks in which he reprised a dramatic part he had played on stage. In the same period, Karloff had a supporting role as a mob boss in Hawks' gangster film Scarface starring Paul Muni and George Raft, but the film was not released until 1932 because of censorship problems.

He did another serial for Thorpe, King of the Wild (1931), then had support parts in Cracked Nuts (1931) with Wheeler and Woolsey, Young Donovan's Kid (1931) with Jackie Cooper, Smart Money (1931) with Edward G. Robinson and James Cagney in their only film together, The Public Defender (1931) with Richard Dix, I Like Your Nerve (1931) with Douglas Fairbanks Jr. and Loretta Young, and Graft (1931) with Regis Toomey and future agent Sue Carol.

Another significant role in the autumn of 1931 saw Karloff play a key supporting part as an unethical newspaper reporter in Five Star Final with Edward G. Robinson, a film about tabloid journalism which was nominated for the Academy Award for Best Picture.

He could also be seen in The Yellow Ticket (1931) with Elissa Landi, Lionel Barrymore and Laurence Olivier during Olivier's memorable first round in Hollywood, The Mad Genius (1931) with John Barrymore, The Guilty Generation (1931) with Robert Young and Tonight or Never (1931) with Gloria Swanson.

=== Stardom ===
Karloff acted in eighty-one films before being discovered by James Whale and cast in Frankenstein (1931). Karloff's role as Frankenstein's monster was physically demanding – it necessitated a bulky costume with four-inch platform boots – but the costume and extensive makeup produced an iconic image. The costume was a job in itself for Karloff with the shoes weighing 11 pounds (5.0 kg) each, which further aggravated his back problems. Universal Studios quickly copyrighted the makeup design for the Frankenstein monster that Jack P. Pierce had created.

It took a while for Karloff's stardom to be established with the public – he had small roles in Behind the Mask (1932), Business and Pleasure (1932) and The Miracle Man (1932). As receipts for Frankenstein and Scarface flooded in, Universal gave Karloff third billing in Night World (1932), with Lew Ayres, Mae Clarke and George Raft.

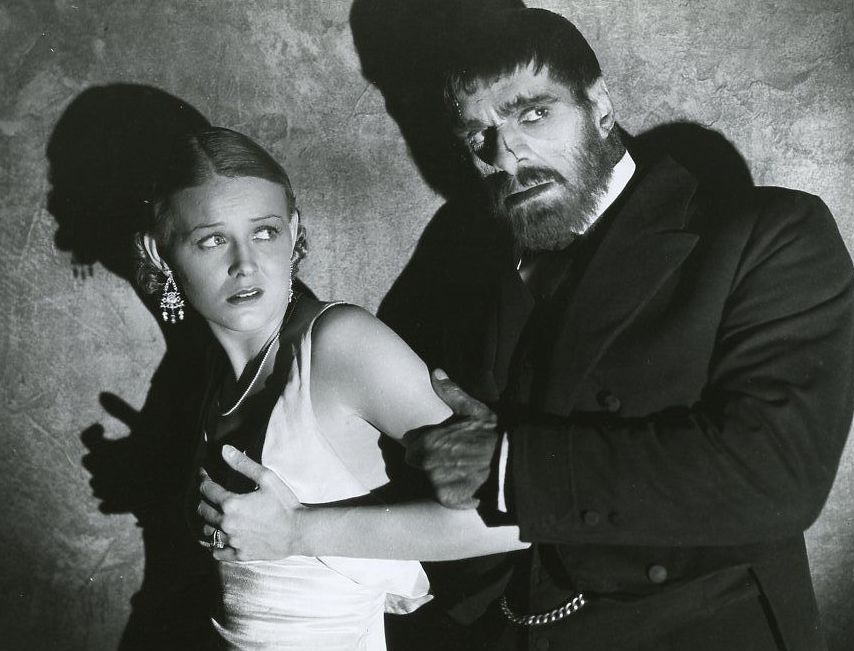
Gloria Stuart and Karloff in The Old Dark House (1932)

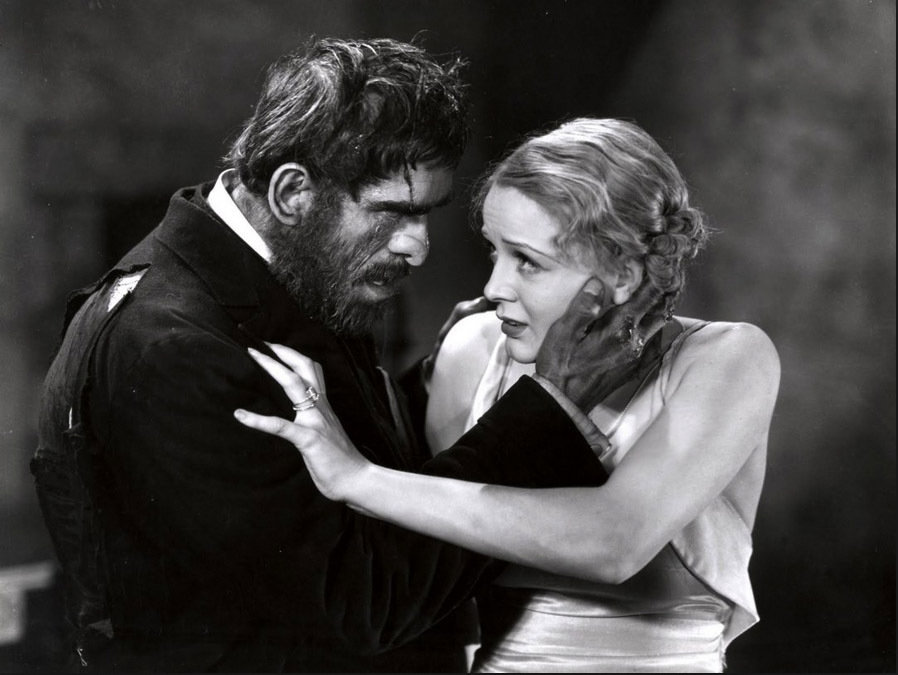
Karloff and Gloria Stuart in The Old Dark House (1932)

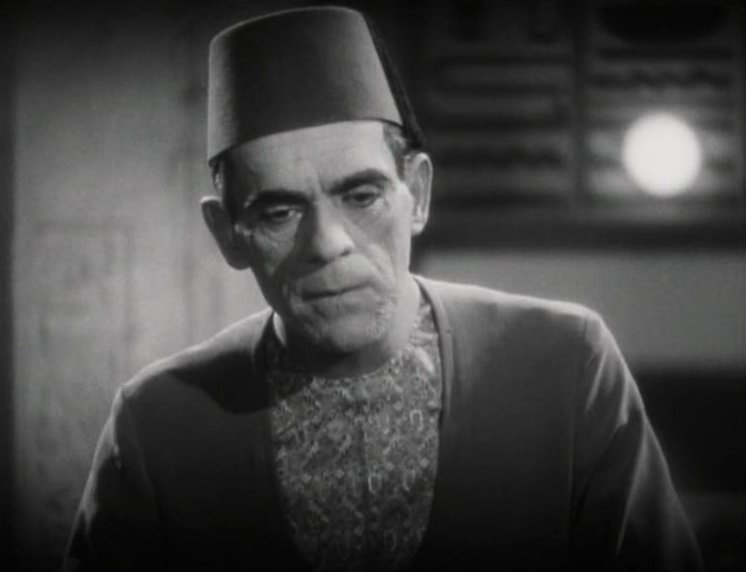
Karloff in The Mummy (1932)

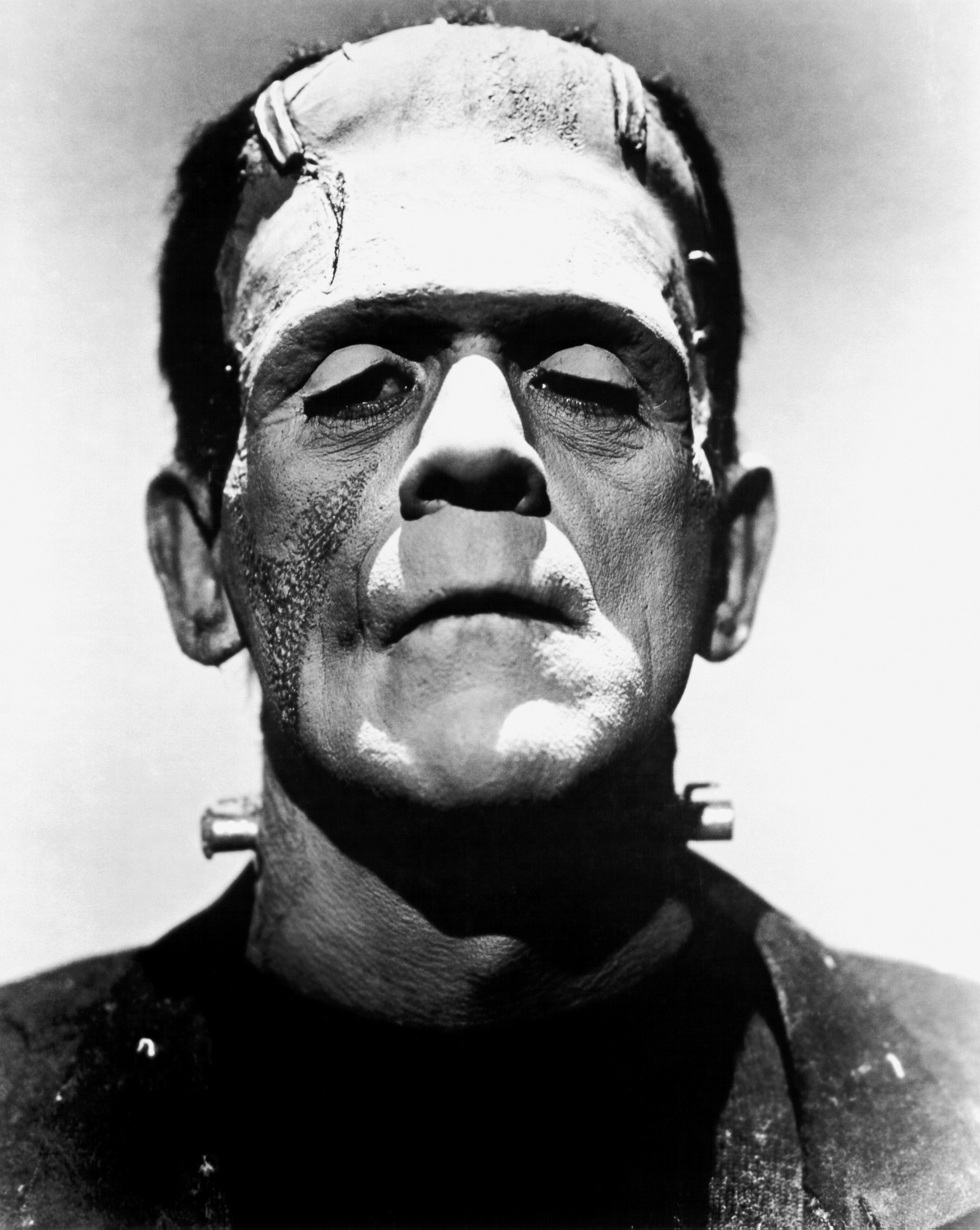
Karloff in Bride of Frankenstein (1935)

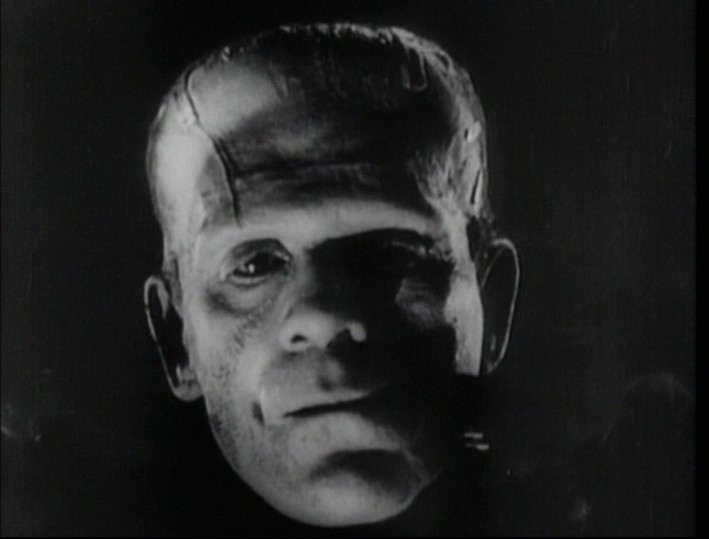
Karloff in Bride of Frankenstein (1935) trailer

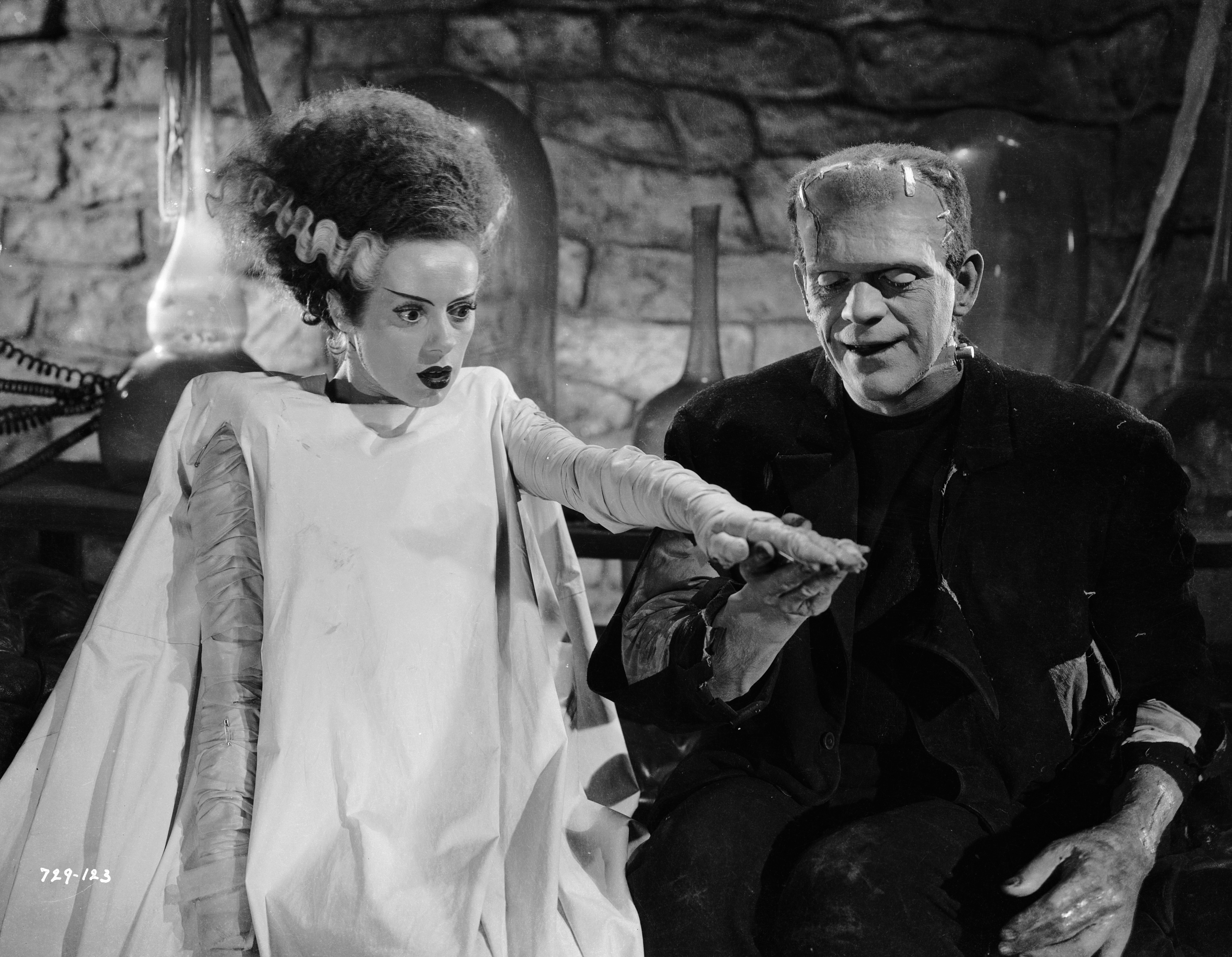
Elsa Lanchester and Karloff in Bride of Frankenstein (1935)

Karloff was reunited with Whale at Universal for The Old Dark House (1932), a horror film based on the novel Benighted by J. B. Priestley, in which he finally enjoyed top billing above Melvyn Douglas, Charles Laughton, Raymond Massey and Gloria Stuart; he was billed simply as "KARLOFF", a custom that Universal continued for several years. He was loaned to MGM to play the titular role in The Mask of Fu Manchu (also 1932), for which he had top billing.

Back at Universal, he was cast as Imhotep who is revived to life in The Mummy (1932), an original story inspired by the unsealing of Tutankhamun's tomb, conceived to continue the success of the Dracula and Frankenstein adaptations. The Mummy was as successful at the box-office as his other two films and Karloff was now established as a star of horror films. Like Frankenstein, The Mummy would spawn a line of sequels, although Karloff would not reprise the iconic 1932 role.

Karloff returned to England to star in The Ghoul (1933), then made a non-horror film for John Ford, The Lost Patrol (1934), for which his performance was highly acclaimed.

Karloff was third billed in the Twentieth Century Pictures historical film The House of Rothschild (1934) with George Arliss, which was highly popular.

Horror had become Karloff's primary genre, and he gave a string of lauded performances in Universal's horror films, including several with Bela Lugosi, his main rival as heir to Lon Chaney's status as the leading horror film star. While the long-standing, creative partnership between Karloff and Lugosi never led to a close friendship, it produced some of the actors' most revered and enduring productions, beginning with The Black Cat (1934) and continuing with Gift of Gab (1934), in which both had cameos. Karloff reprised the role of Frankenstein's monster in Bride of Frankenstein (1935) for James Whale. Then he and Lugosi were reunited for The Raven (1935). Billed only by his last name during this period, Karloff had top billing above Lugosi in all their films together despite Lugosi having the larger role in The Raven.

For Columbia, Karloff made The Black Room (1935) then he returned to Universal for The Invisible Ray (1936) with Lugosi, more a science fiction film. Karloff was then cast in a Warner Bros. horror film, The Walking Dead (1936).

Because the Motion Picture Production Code (known as the Hays Code) began to be seriously enforced in 1934, horror films declined in the second half of the 1930s. Karloff worked in other genres, making two films in Britain, Juggernaut (1936) and The Man Who Changed His Mind (1936) which was released in the U.S. as The Man Who Lived Again.

He returned to Hollywood to play a supporting role in Charlie Chan at the Opera (1936), then starred in a crime drama, Night Key (1937). At Warners, he did two films with John Farrow, playing a Chinese warlord in West of Shanghai (1937) and a murder suspect in The Invisible Menace (1938).

Karloff went to Monogram to play the title role of a Chinese detective in Mr. Wong, Detective (1938), which led to a series. Karloff's portrayal of the character is an example of Hollywood's use of yellowface and its portrayal of East Asians in the earlier half of the 20th century. He had another heroic role in Devil's Island (1939).

Universal found reissuing Dracula and Frankenstein led to success at the box-office and began to produce horror films again starting with Son of Frankenstein (1939). Karloff reprised his role, with Lugosi also starring as Ygor and top-billed Basil Rathbone as Dr. Frankenstein. This was Karloff's first Universal film since the original Frankenstein in which Karloff was not top billed as "KARLOFF", a custom that the studio had used for eight films in a row while Karloff was at the height of his career. Basil Rathbone held top billing for Son of Frankenstein, and since Rathbone, Karloff and Lugosi were all billed above the title, billing Basil, Boris and Bela was hard to resist. Karloff was never billed by simply his last name again. Regarding Son of Frankenstein, the film's director Rowland V. Lee said his crew let Lugosi "work on the characterization; the interpretation he gave us was imaginative and totally unexpected ... when we finished shooting, there was no doubt in anyone's mind that he stole the show. Karloff's monster was weak by comparison."

After The Mystery of Mr. Wong (1939) and Mr. Wong in Chinatown (1939) he signed a three-picture deal with Columbia, starting with The Man They Could Not Hang (1939). Karloff returned to Universal to make Tower of London (1939) with Rathbone, playing Mord, the murderous henchman of King Richard III.

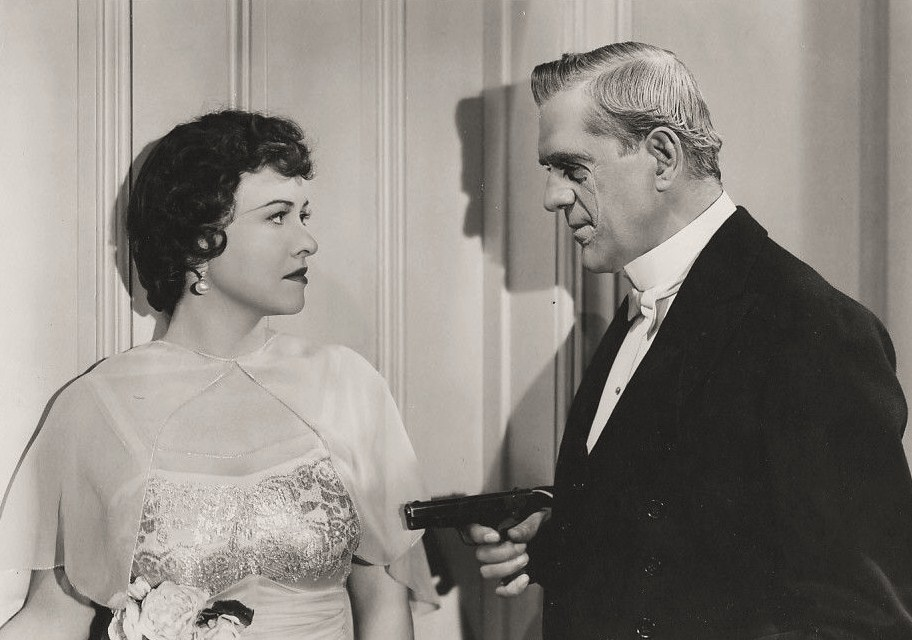
Karloff with Margaret Lindsay in British Intelligence (1940)

Karloff made a fourth Mr Wong film at Monogram The Fatal Hour (1940). At Warners he was in British Intelligence (1940), then he went to Universal to do Black Friday (1940) with Lugosi.

Karloff's second and third films for Columbia were The Man with Nine Lives (1940) and Before I Hang (1940). In between he did a fifth and final Mr Wong film, Doomed to Die (1940).

Karloff appeared at a celebrity baseball game as Frankenstein's monster in 1940, hitting a gag home run and making catcher Buster Keaton fall into an acrobatic dead faint as the monster stomped into home plate.

Karloff finished a six-picture commitment with Monogram with The Ape (1940). He and Lugosi appeared with Peter Lorre in a comedy at RKO, You'll Find Out (1941), then he went to Columbia for The Devil Commands (1941) and The Boogie Man Will Get You (1941).

=== Professional expansion and further success ===
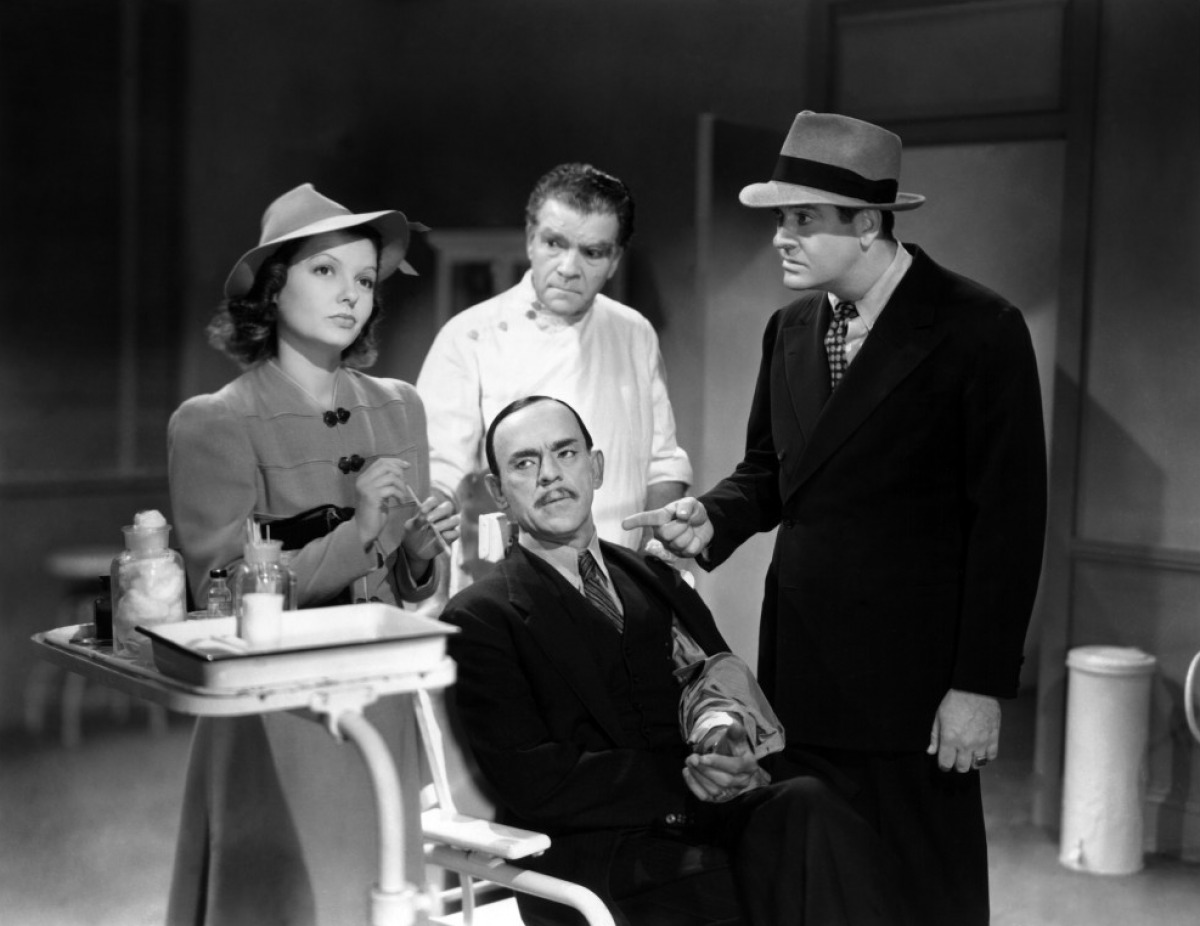
L–R: Marjorie Reynolds, Boris Karloff (seated), Raymond Hatton and Grant Withers in Doomed to Die (1940)

An enthusiastic performer, he returned to the Broadway stage in the original production of Arsenic and Old Lace in 1941, in which he played a homicidal gangster enraged to be frequently mistaken for Karloff. Frank Capra cast Raymond Massey in the 1944 film, which was shot in 1941, while Karloff was still appearing in the role on Broadway. The play's producers allowed the film to be made conditionally: it was not to be released until the production closed. (Karloff reprised his role on television in the anthology series The Best of Broadway (1955), and with Tony Randall and Tom Bosley in a 1962 production on the Hallmark Hall of Fame. He also starred in a radio adaptation produced by Screen Guild Theatre in 1946.)

In 1944, he underwent a spinal operation to relieve a chronic arthritic condition.

Karloff returned to film roles in The Climax (1944), an unsuccessful attempt to repeat the success of Phantom of the Opera (1943). More liked was House of Frankenstein (1944), marking Karloff's "retirement" from playing the Monster, where instead, he comes full circle to play the villainous Dr. Niemann, a mad scientist fixated on life-experiments much like Henry Frankenstein, and pass the torch to actor Glenn Strange, who would play the Monster in subsequent films.

Karloff made three films for producer Val Lewton at RKO: The Body Snatcher (1945), his last teaming with Lugosi, Isle of the Dead (1945) and Bedlam (1946).

In a 1946 interview with Louis Berg of the Los Angeles Times, Karloff discussed his arrangement with RKO, working with Lewton and his reasons for leaving Universal. Karloff left Universal because he thought the Frankenstein franchise had run its course; the entries in the series after Son of Frankenstein were B-pictures. Berg wrote that the last installment in which Karloff appeared—House of Frankenstein—was what he called a " 'monster clambake,' with everything thrown in—Frankenstein, Dracula, a hunchback and a 'man-beast' that howled in the night. It was too much. Karloff thought it was ridiculous and said so." Berg explained that the actor had "great love and respect for" Lewton, who was "the man who rescued him from the living dead and restored, so to speak, his soul."

Horror films experienced a decline in popularity after the war, and Karloff found himself working in other genres.

For the Danny Kaye comedy The Secret Life of Walter Mitty (1947), Karloff appeared in a brief but starring role as Dr. Hugo Hollingshead, a psychiatrist. Director Norman Z. McLeod shot a sequence with Karloff in the Frankenstein monster make-up, but it was deleted from the finished film.

Karloff appeared in a film noir, Lured (1947) with Lucille Ball, and as an Indian in Unconquered (1947). He had support roles in Dick Tracy Meets Gruesome (1947), Tap Roots (1948), and Abbott and Costello Meet the Killer, Boris Karloff (1949).

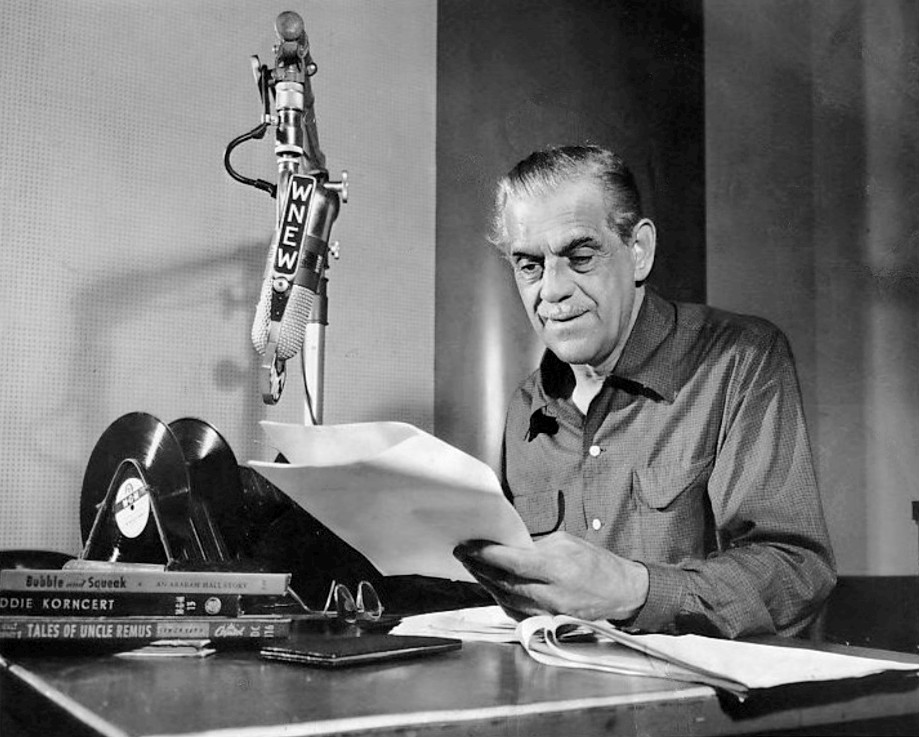
Karloff had his own weekly children's radio show Boris Karloff's Treasure Chest on WNEW, New York, in 1950. He played children's music and told stories and riddles. Although the programme was meant for children, Karloff attracted many adult listeners as well.

During this period, Karloff was a frequent guest on radio programmes, whether it was starring in Arch Oboler's Chicago-based Lights Out productions (including the episode "Cat Wife") or spoofing his horror image with Fred Allen or Jack Benny. In 1949, he was the host and star of Starring Boris Karloff, a radio and television anthology series for the ABC broadcasting network.

He appeared as the villainous Captain Hook in Peter Pan in a 1950 stage musical adaptation which also featured Jean Arthur.

Karloff returned to horror films with The Strange Door (1951) and The Black Castle (1952) co-starring Lon Chaney Jr.

He was nominated for a Tony Award for his work opposite Julie Harris in The Lark, by the French playwright Jean Anouilh, about Joan of Arc, which he reprised years later on TV's Hallmark Hall of Fame.

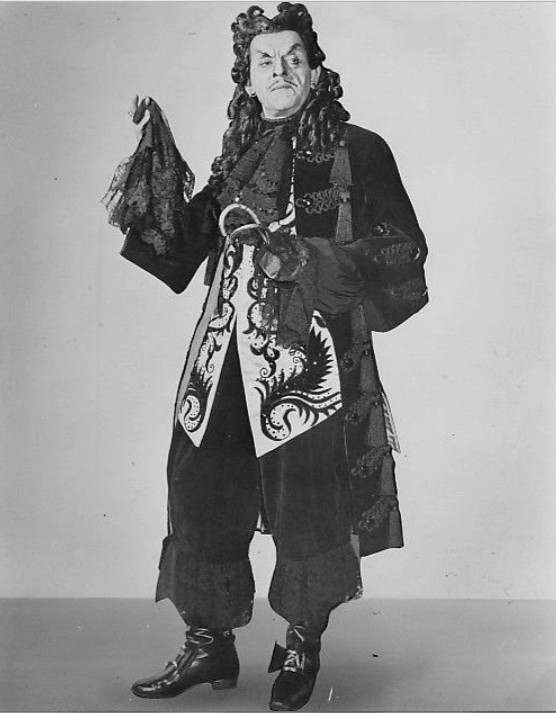
Boris Karloff as Captain Hook in Peter Pan (1950)

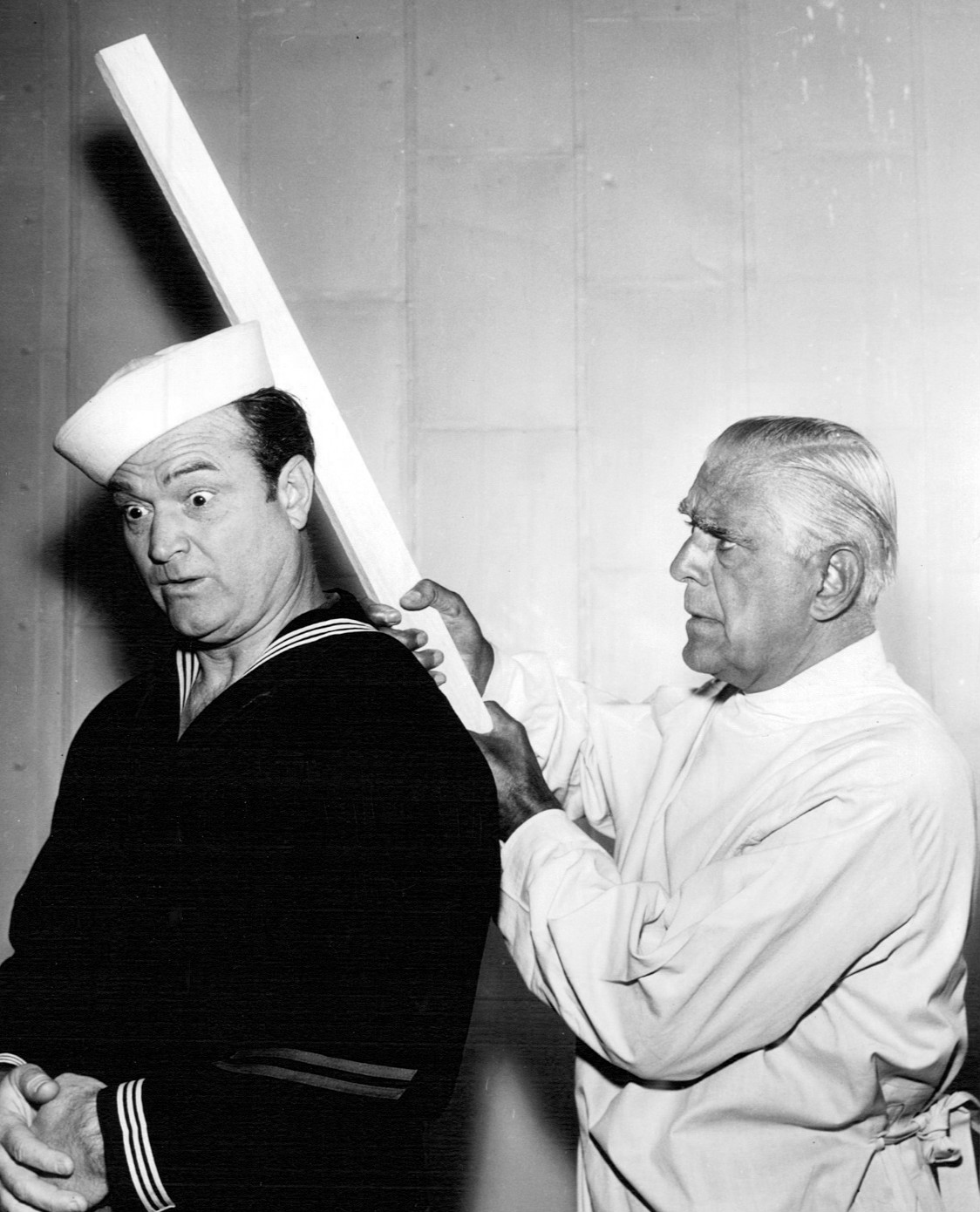
Karloff played a foreign scientist who hoped to gain defence secrets from Cookie the Sailor (Skelton) on The Red Skelton Show in 1954.

Karloff played detective Colonel March on Colonel March of Scotland Yard in 1955.

During the 1950s, he appeared on British television in the series Colonel March of Scotland Yard, in which he portrayed John Dickson Carr's fictional detective Colonel March, who was known for solving apparently impossible crimes. Christopher Lee appeared alongside Karloff in the episode "At Night, All Cats are Grey" broadcast in 1955. A little later, Karloff co-starred with Lee in the film Corridors of Blood (1958).

Karloff appeared in Abbott and Costello Meet Dr. Jekyll and Mr. Hyde (1952) and visited Italy for The Island Monster (1954) and then returned to Hollywood to appear in Sabaka (1954).

Karloff, along with H. V. Kaltenborn, was a regular panelist on the NBC game show, Who Said That? which aired between 1948 and 1955. Later, as a guest on NBC's The Gisele MacKenzie Show, Karloff sang "Those Were the Good Old Days" from Damn Yankees while Gisele MacKenzie performed the solo, "Give Me the Simple Life". On The Red Skelton Show, Karloff guest starred along with actor Vincent Price in a parody of Frankenstein, with Red Skelton as "Klem Kadiddle Monster". He served as host and one of the stars of the anthology series The Veil (1958), a 12-episode Hal Roach TV series which was never broadcast at all due to financial problems at the producing studio; the complete series was later rediscovered in the 1990s and eventually released on DVD.

Karloff made some horror films in the late 1950s: Voodoo Island (1957), The Haunted Strangler (1958), Frankenstein 1970 (1958) (this time as the Baron), and Corridors of Blood (1958). Karloff donned the Frankenstein Monster make-up for the last time in 1962 for a Halloween episode of the TV series Route 66, which also featured Peter Lorre and Lon Chaney Jr.

During this period, he hosted and acted in a number of television series, including Thriller and Britain's Out of This World.

=== Spoken word recordings and horror anthologies ===
He recorded the title role of Shakespeare's Cymbeline for the Shakespeare Recording Society (Caedmon Audio 1962). He also recorded the narration for Sergei Prokofiev's Peter and the Wolf with the Vienna State Opera Orchestra under Mario Rossi.

Records he made for the children's market included Three Little Pigs and Other Fairy Stories, Tales of the Frightened (volume 1 and 2), Rudyard Kipling's Just So Stories and, with Cyril Ritchard and Celeste Holm, Mother Goose Nursery Rhymes, and Lewis Carroll's The Hunting of the Snark.

Karloff was credited for editing several horror anthologies, commencing with Tales of Terror (Cleveland and NY: World Publishing Co, 1943) (compiled with the help of Edmond Speare). This wartime-published anthology went through at least five printings to September 1945. It has been reprinted recently (Orange NJ: Idea Men, 2007). Karloff's name was also attached to And the Darkness Falls (Cleveland and NY: World Publishing Co, 1946); and The Boris Karloff Horror Anthology (London: Souvenir Press, 1965; simultaneous publication in Canada - Toronto: The Ryerson Press; US pbk reprint NY: Avon Books, 1965 retitled as Boris Karloff's Favourite Horror Stories; UK pbk reprints London: Corgi, 1969 and London: Everest, 1975, both under the original title), though it is less clear whether Karloff himself actually edited these.

Tales of the Frightened (Belmont Books, 1963), though based on the recordings by Karloff of the same title, and featuring his image on the book cover, contained stories written by Michael Avallone; the second volume, More Tales of the Frightened, contained stories authored by Robert Lory. Both Avallone and Lory worked closely with Canadian editor and book packager Lyle Kenyon Engel, who also ghost-edited a horror story anthology for horror film star Basil Rathbone.

=== Final roles and work ===
Boris Karloff acting with a young Jack Nicholson in a scene from the 1963 film The Terror

Karloff went to Italy to appear in Black Sabbath (1963) directed by Mario Bava. He made The Raven (1963) for Roger Corman and American International Pictures (AIP). When The Raven had successfully wrapped shooting with time left in Karloff's contract, Corman conscribed a new story with the same sets to feature Karloff in The Terror (1963), with Jack Nicholson in the leading role and Karloff playing a baron who murdered his wife. He made a cameo in AIP's Bikini Beach (1964) and had a bigger role in that studio's The Comedy of Terrors (1964), directed by Jacques Tourneur, and travelled to England to make Die, Monster, Die! (1965) co-starring Nick Adams. British actress Suzan Farmer, who played his daughter in the film, later recalled Karloff was aloof during production "and wasn't the charming personality people perceived him to be", probably because he was in such intense pain in the 1960s.

Attack of the Giant Salami was a proposed 1964 horror film spoof that would've co-starred Karloff with Joe E. Brown and Valda Hansen. Producer Ed Wood was inspired by the 1963 Karloff/Brown collaboration The Comedy of Terrors. The film was never made however, due to Karloff's lack of interest.

In 1966, Karloff also appeared with Robert Vaughn and Stefanie Powers in the spy series The Girl from U.N.C.L.E., in the episode "The Mother Muffin Affair", Karloff performing in drag as the titular character. That same year, he also played an Indian Maharajah on the installment of the adventure series The Wild Wild West titled "The Night of the Golden Cobra". Karloff's last film for AIP was The Ghost in the Invisible Bikini (1966).

In 1967, he played an eccentric Spanish professor who believes himself to be Don Quixote in a whimsical episode of I Spy titled "Mainly on the Plains", which he filmed in Spain. Cauldron of Blood, shot in Spain around the same time, and co-starring Viveca Lindfors, was only released in 1970 after Karloff's death.

In the mid-1960s, he enjoyed a late-career surge in the United States when he narrated the made-for-television animated film of Dr. Seuss' How the Grinch Stole Christmas, and also provided the voice of the Grinch, although the song "You're a Mean One, Mr. Grinch" was sung by the American voice actor Thurl Ravenscroft. The film was first broadcast on CBS-TV in 1966. Karloff later received a Grammy Award for "Best Recording For Children" after the recording was commercially released. Because Ravenscroft (who never met Karloff in the course of their work on the show) was uncredited for his contribution to How the Grinch Stole Christmas!, his performance of the song was at times misattributed to Karloff.

He appeared in Mad Monster Party? (1967) and went to England to star in the second feature film of the British director Michael Reeves, The Sorcerers (1967).

Karloff starred in Targets (1968), the first feature film directed by Peter Bogdanovich, featuring two separate plotlines that converge into one. In one, a disturbed young man kills his family, then embarks on a killing spree. In the other, a famous horror-film actor confirms his retirement, agreeing to one last appearance at a drive-in cinema. Karloff starred as the retired horror film actor, Byron Orlok, a thinly disguised version of himself; Orlok (named both for Karloff himself and Count Orlok) was facing an end-of-life crisis, which he resolves through a confrontation with the crazed gunman at the drive-in cinema.

Around the same time, he played the occult expert Professor Marsh in a British production titled The Crimson Cult (Curse of the Crimson Altar, also 1968), which was the last Karloff film to be released during his lifetime.

He ended his career by appearing in four low-budget Mexican horror films: Isle of the Snake People, The Incredible Invasion, Fear Chamber and House of Evil. This was a package deal with Mexican producer Luis Enrique Vergara. Karloff's scenes for all four films were directed by Jack Hill and shot back-to-back within one month in Los Angeles in the spring of 1968. The films were later completed without him in Mexico and theatrically released in the early 1970s. Karloff was originally slated to travel to Mexico to shoot the films, but he had emphysema and crippling arthritis. Only half of one lung was still functioning and he required oxygen between takes, so Hill arranged for Karloff to film his scenes in California.

Due to the unexpected sudden death of the producer Vergara, all four Mexican films were embroiled for a while in legal actions and were only released posthumously in 1971, with the last, The Incredible Invasion, not released until 1972, more than two years after Karloff's death.

== Later life and death ==
Upon returning to Britain to live in 1959, Karloff's address was 43 Cadogan Square, London. In 1966, he bought 25 Campden House (at 29 Sheffield Terrace), Kensington W8, and Roundabout Cottage in the Hampshire village of Bramshott. A longtime heavy smoker, he had emphysema, which left him most days in a wheelchair, with only half of one lung still functioning.

He contracted bronchitis in late 1968 and was hospitalised at University College Hospital. He died of pneumonia at King Edward VII Hospital, Midhurst, in Sussex, on 2 February 1969, at the age of 81.

His body was cremated following a requested modest service at Guildford Crematorium, Godalming, Surrey, where he is commemorated by a plaque in the Garden of Remembrance. A memorial service was held at St Paul's, Covent Garden ("the Actors' Church"), London, where there is also a plaque.

== Personal life ==
Karloff married six times. His wives included stage actress Grace Harding (married from 1910 to 1913), actress Olive de Wilton (from 1916 to 1919), musician Montana Laurena Williams (from 1920 to 1922) and actress Helen Vivian Soule (from 1924 to 1928).

His fifth marriage to Dorothy Stine lasted from 1930 until 1946. This union resulted in Karloff's only child, daughter Sara Karloff, born on November 23, 1938 (Karloff's own 51st birthday).

His sixth and final marriage, to Evelyn Hope Helmore, was in April 1946, immediately after his fifth divorce. They had been happily married for 23 years at the time of his death.

In 1958, Karloff's niece Diana Bromley was charged with murdering her 10-year-old and 13-year-old sons in Haslemere, England, but was found insane and unfit to plead. She was the daughter of Karloff's brother Sir John Thomas Pratt.

Karloff considered guacamole to be a favorite dish and Mexican cuisine in general to be one of his favorite varieties of gastronomy.

Beginning in 1940, Karloff dressed as Father Christmas every Christmas to hand out presents to physically disabled children in a Baltimore hospital.

He never legally changed his name to "Boris Karloff". He signed official documents "William H. Pratt, a.k.a. Boris Karloff".

He was a charter member of the Screen Actors Guild, and he was especially outspoken due to the long hours he spent in makeup while playing Frankenstein's Monster and the Mummy. He was an early member of the Hollywood Cricket Club.

== Legacy ==
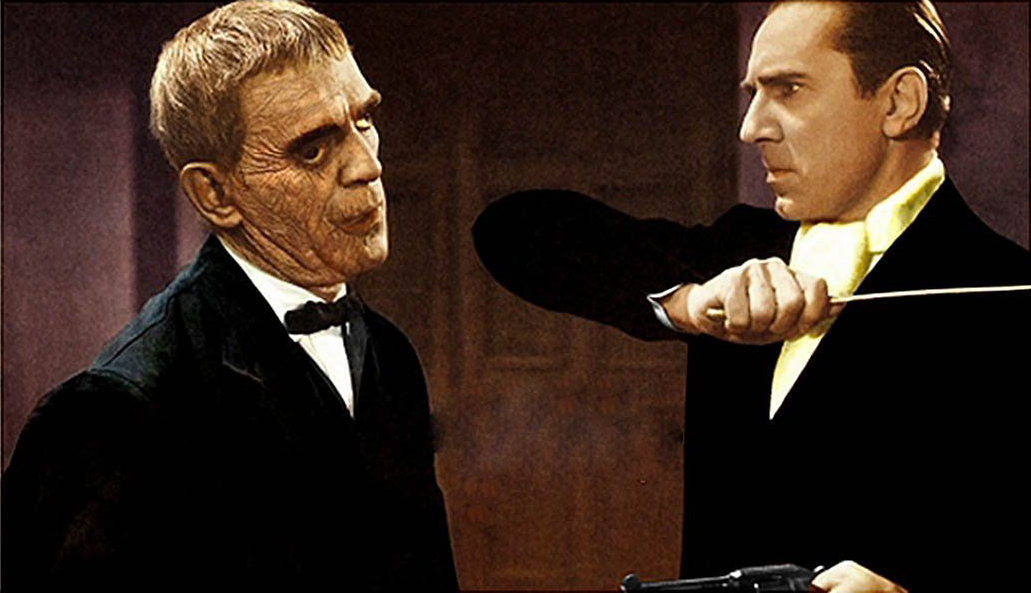
Boris Karloff and Bela Lugosi in The Raven (1935)

During the run of Thriller, Karloff lent his name and likeness to a comic book for Gold Key Comics based upon the series. After Thriller was cancelled, the comic was retitled Boris Karloff's Tales of Mystery. Comics historian Anthony Taylor stated in 2025 that Gold Key "paid Boris Karloff a whopping (for the time) [US]$700.00 a month (or .05¢ per issue of gross sales, whichever was larger) to use his name and likeness for Boris Karloff Tales of Mystery. An illustrated likeness of Karloff continued to introduce each issue of this publication for more than a decade after his death (he was not involved however in writing or drawing the stories); the comic book lasted until February 1980. (A Gold Key comic book series based upon The Twilight Zone that ran concurrently with Karloff's did the same thing with host Rod Serling's likeness after his death.) In 2009, Dark Horse Comics began publishing reprints of Boris Karloff's Tales of Mystery in a hardcover edition.

For his contribution to film and television, Karloff was awarded two stars on the Hollywood Walk of Fame, at 1737 Vine Street for motion pictures, and 6664 Hollywood Boulevard for television. He was featured by the U.S. Postal Service as Frankenstein's Monster and the Mummy in its series "Classic Monster Movie Stamps" issued in September 1997. In 1998, an English Heritage blue plaque was unveiled in his hometown in London. The British film magazine Empire in 2016 ranked Karloff's portrayal as Frankenstein's monster the sixth-greatest horror movie character of all time.

In The Simpsons episode "Lisa vs. Malibu Stacy", Karloff was depicted having personal correspondence with Abraham Simpson.

A street called Karloff Way, near Rochester, England, is named in his honour.

== Radio appearances (1932–1968) ==
Program	Episode	Date	Notes
California Melodies	Karloff appeared with the Hallelujah Quartet	Jan. 3, 1932	
Hollywood on the Air (Hollywood on Parade)	Karloff appeared with Katharine Hepburn	Nov. 25, 1932	
Hollywood on the Air (Hollywood on Parade)	Karloff appeared with Victor McLaglen	Oct. 7, 1933	
California Melodies	Karloff appeared as a guest	Oct. 24, 1933	
Hollywood on the Air	Karloff appeared as a guest	Jan. 27, 1934	
Forty-Five Minutes in Hollywood	Karloff appeared as a guest twice	Feb. 15 & Aug. 2, 1934	
The Show	Episode "Death Takes a Holiday"	Aug. 27, 1934	
The Fleischmann's Yeast Hour (with Rudy Vallee)	Episode "Death Takes a Holiday"	Oct. 11, 1934	
Shell Chateau (hosted by Al Jolson)	Episode "The Green Goddess" with George Jessel	Aug. 31, 1935	
Hollywood Boulevardier	interviewed by Ben Alexander	Dec. 30, 1935	
The Fleischmann's Yeast Hour (with Rudy Vallee)	Episode "The Bells"	Feb. 6, 1936	
In Town Tonight	Karloff appeared as a guest	Feb. 22, 1936	
The Fleischmann's Yeast Hour (with Rudy Vallee)	Karloff appeared as a guest	Sept. 3, 1936	
Camel Caravan	Episode "Death Takes a Holiday" with Benny Goodman	Dec. 8, 1936	
Concert Orchestra	Karloff appeared with Dolores Del Rio	Sept. 2, 1936	
The Royal Gelatin Hour (aka Vallee's Varieties)	Karloff reads "Resurrection"; co-starred Tom Mix	Nov. 11, 1937	
The Chase and Sanborn Hour (aka The Charlie McCarthy Show)	Recites "The Evil Eye" ("The Tell-Tale Heart")	January 30, 1938	
The Baker's Broadcast	Karloff and Bela Lugosi sang a duet on this show called "We're Horrible, Horrible Men"; co-starring Ozzie and Harriet	Mar. 13, 1938	
Lights Out	Episode: "The Dream"	23 March 1938	
Lights Out	Episode: "Valse Triste"	30 March 1938	
Lights Out	"Cat Wife" by Arch Oboler	6 April 1938	
Lights Out	Episode: "Three Matches"	13 April 1938	
Lights Out	Episode: "Night on the Mountain"	20 April 1938	
The Royal Gelatin Hour (hosted by Rudy Vallee)	Skit "Danse Macabre"	May 5, 1938	
Hollywood (hosted by George McCall)	appeared as a guest	Oct. 27, 1938	
The Eddie Cantor Show	Variety show	Jan. 16, 1939	
The Royal Gelatin Hour (with Rudy Vallee)	Skit "Resurrection"	April 6, 1939	
Kay Kayser's Kollege of Musical Knowledge	appeared with Bela Lugosi and Peter Lorre promoting their film You'll Find Out	Sept. 25, 1940	
Everyman's Theater	Episode "Cat Wife" by Arch Oboler	Oct. 18, 1940	
Stars on Parade	Episode "The Big Man"	1941	
Information Please	Radio Quiz show	Jan. 24, 1941	
ASCAP on Parade	appeared as a guest	Feb. 8, 1941	
Best Plays	Arsenic and Old Lace	1941	
Kate Smith Variety	appeared as a guest	March 7, 1941	
Hollywood News Girl	Karloff interviewed	Mar. 22, 1941	
Inner Sanctum	Karloff acted in 21 episodes of this radio show	Mar. 16, 1941 – July 13, 1952	(See subsection on Karloff's "Inner Sanctum" radio appearances below.)
We the People	appeared as a guest	Apr. 1, 1941	
The Voice of Broadway	Karloff interviewed	Apr. 19, 1941	
WHN Bundles for Britain	appeared as a guest	June 14, 1941	
United Press is on the Air	appeared as a guest	July 11, 1941	
The Gloria Whitney Show	appeared as a guest	Aug. 13, 1941	
The USO Program	appeared with Paul Lukas	Nov. 23, 1941	
Time to Smile	hosted by Eddie Cantor	Dec. 7, 1941	
Keep 'em Rolling	Episode "In the Fog"	Feb. 8, 1942	
Information Please	Karloff appeared on this quiz show with John Carradine	Feb. 20, 1942	
Information Please	TV Quiz Show	May 17, 1943	
Blue Ribbon Town	hosted by Groucho Marx	July 24, 1943	
The Theatre Guild on the Air	Arsenic and Old Lace	1943	
Creeps By Night	30-minute suspense anthology; Karloff starred in ten episodes	Feb. 15-May 9, 1944	(See subsection on Karloff's "Creeps by Night" radio appearances below.)
Blue Ribbon Town	hosted by Groucho Marx	June 3, 1944	
Duffy's Tavern	appeared as a guest	Jan. 12, 1945	
Suspense	Episode "Drury's Bones"	Jan. 25, 1945	
Those Websters	appeared as a guest	Oct. 19, 1945	
Hildegarde's Radio Room	appeared as a guest	Oct. 23, 1945	
The Charlie McCarthy Show	appeared as a guest	Nov. 3, 1945	
Report to the Nation	Episode "Back for Christmas"	Nov. 3, 1945	
Information Please	TV Quiz Show	Nov. 5, 1945	
Theatre Guild on the Air	Two plays: "The Emperor Jones" and "Where the Cross is Made"	Nov. 11, 1945	
The Fred Allen Show	appeared as a guest	Nov. 18, 1945	
The Screen Guild Theater	Arsenic and Old Lace	25 November 1946	
Textron Theatre	Episode "Angel Street"	Dec. 8, 1945	
Exploring the Unknown	Episode "The Baffled Genie"	Dec. 23, 1945	
Information Please	TV Quiz Show	Dec. 24, 1945	
The Kate Smith Show	appeared as a guest	Jan. 4, 1946	
Repeat Performance	Karloff appeared with Roy Rogers and Allan Jones	Feb. 3, 1946	
The Jack Haley Show (aka The Village Store)	appeared as a guest	Feb. 14, 1946	
The Bandwagon Show	appeared as a guest	March 24, 1946	
The Ginny Simms Show	appeared as a guest	April 5, 1946	
Show Stoppers	appeared as a guest	May 26, 1946	
That's Life	appeared as a guest; hosted by Jay Flippen	Nov. 8, 1946	
The Lady Esther Screen Guild Players	Karloff acted in Arsenic and Old Lace	Nov. 25, 1946	
The Jack Benny Show	appeared as a guest	Jan. 19, 1947	
Kay Kyser's Kollege of Musical Knowledge	appeared as a guest	March 12, 1947	
Duffy's Tavern	appeared as a guest	May 21, 1947	
Lights Out	"Death Robbery"	16 July 1947	
Lights Out	"The Ring"	30 July 1947	(See subsection on Karloff's "Lights Out!" radio episodes below.)
Philco Radio Time	hosted by Bing Crosby	Oct. 29, 1947	
The Burl Ives Show	appeared as a guest	Halloween 1947	
The Jimmy Durante Show	appeared as a guest	Dec. 10, 1947	
Suspense	Episode "Wet Saturday"	Dec. 19, 1947	
The Kraft Music Hall	hosted by Al Jolson	Christmas Day, 1947	
Information Please	TV Quiz Show	Jan. 16, 1948	
Guest Star	Skit "The Babysitter"	Sept. 12, 1948	
The NBC University Theatre of the Air	starred in H. G. Wells' "The History of Mr. Polly"	Oct. 17, 1948	
The Sealtest Variety Theatre	appeared as a guest	Oct. 28, 1948	
Great Scenes From Great Plays	starred in the play "On Borrowed Time"	Oct. 29, 1948	
Truth or Consequences		Oct. 30, 1948	
The Lady Esther Screen Guild Playhouse	Arsenic and Old Lace	Late 1940s	
Theatre USA	appeared as a guest	Feb. 3, 1949	
The Spike Jones Spotlight Review	appeared as a guest	Apr. 9, 1949	
Twenty Questions	hosted by Bill Slater	Apr. 16, 1949	
Theatre Guild on the Air	Episode "The Perfect Aibi"	May 29, 1949	
The Sealtest Variety Theatre	appeared as a guest	June 23, 1949	
Starring Boris Karloff	13-episode weekly anthology show hosted by Karloff	Sept. 21–Dec. 14, 1949	(See subsection on Karloff's "Starring Boris Karloff" radio episodes below.)
The Bill Stern Colgate Sports Newsreel	appeared as a guest	Jan. 13, 1950	
Invitation to Music	appeared as a guest	June 18, 1950	
The Barbara Welles Show	appeared as a guest	Aug. 18, 1950	
Boris Karloff's Treasure Chest	hosted 14 weekly children's radio programs	Sept. 17, 1950 – Dec. 17, 1950	
Theatre Guild on the Air	starred in play "David Copperfield"	Dec. 24, 1950	
Duffy's Tavern	appeared as a guest	Oct. 5, 1951	
It's News To Me	appeared as a guest	Dec. 24, 1951	
Philip Morris Playhouse	Episode "Journey to Nowhere"	Feb. 10, 1952	
Musical Comedy Theatre	appeared in play "Yolanda and the Thief"	Feb. 20, 1952	
Theatre Guild on the Air	appeared in play "Oliver Twist" with Basil Rathbone	Feb. 24, 1952	
The Dean Martin and Jerry Lewis Show	appeared as a guest	April 18, 1952	
Theatre Guild on the Air (aka The U.S. Steel Hour)	appeared in play "The Sea Wolf" with Burgess Meredith	27 April 1952	
The Philip Morris Playhouse on Broadway	appeared in play "Outward Bound"	June 1, 1952	
Best Plays	appeared in play Arsenic and Old Lace with Donald Cook	July 6, 1952	
Musical Comedy Theater	appeared in play "Yolanda and the Thief" (rerun)	Nov. 26, 1952	
Philip Morris Playhouse on Broadway	appeared in play "Man vs. Town"	Dec. 10, 1952	
The U.S. Steel Hour	appeared in play "Great Expectations" with Estelle Winwood	Apr. 5, 1953	
Philip Morris Playhouse on Broadway	appeared in play "Dead Past"	Apr. 15, 1953	
Heritage	appeared in play "Plague"	Apr. 23, 1953	
Philip Morris Playhouse on Broadway	appeared in a play	June 17, 1953	
The Play of His Choice (British radio show)	appeared in play "The Hanging Judge"	Dec. 2, 1953	
The Spoken Word	appeared as a guest	Mar. 29, 1956	
Alaska Broadcast	Karloff was interviewed while in Alaska	Mar. 19, 1957	
Easy as ABC	Karloff appeared on this radio show with Peter Lorre and Alfred Hitchcock	Apr. 27, 1958	
Flair	Karloff appeared several times as a guest	between 1960 and 1961	
The Barry Gray Show	appeared as a guest with Peter Lorre	Jan. 26, 1963	
For Young People (British BBC)	The play "Peter Pan" was broadcast (most likely a rebroadcast from 1950)	July 27, 1963	
Interval: Boris Karloff Looks Back (British BBC)	Karloff appeared as a guest on this British radio show	July 20, 1965	
Reader's Digest Radio Show	recorded various spots	1956 through 1960s	

=== Appearances on Lights Out! ===
Karloff acted in 7 episodes of the Lights Out! NBC anthology radio series from 1938 to 1947:

- "The Dream" (March 23, 1938)
- "Valse Triste" (March 30, 1938)
- "Cat Wife" by Arch Oboler (April 6, 1938)
- "Three Matches" (April 13, 1938)
- "Night on the Mountain" April 20, 1938)
- "Death Robbery" (July 16, 1947)
- "The Ring" (July 30, 1947)

=== Appearances on Inner Sanctum ===
Karloff acted in 22 episodes of the Inner Sanctum ABC anthology radio series from 1941 to 1952:

- "The Man of Steel" (Mar. 16, 1941)
- "The Man Who Hated Death" (Mar. 23, 1941)
- "Death in the Zoo" (Apr. 6, 1941)
- "Fog" (Apr. 20, 1941)
- "Imperfect Crime" (May 11, 1941)
- "Fall of the House of Usher" (June 1, 1941)
- "Green-Eyed Bat" (June 22, 1941)
- "The Man who Painted Death" (June 29, 1941)
- "Death is a Murderer" (July 13, 1941)
- "The Tell-Tale Heart" (Aug. 3, 1941)
- "Terror on Bailey street" (Oct. 26, 1941)
- "Fall of the House of Usher" (Apr. 5, 1942) may be a rerun
- "Blackstone" (Apr. 19, 1942)
- "Study for Murder" (May 3, 1942)
- "The Cone" (May 24, 1942)
- "Death Wears my Face" (May 31, 1942)
- "Strange Bequest" (June 7, 1942)
- "The Grey Wolf" (June 21, 1942)
- "Corridor of Doom" (Oct. 23, 1945)
- "The Wailing Wall" (Nov. 6, 1945)
- "Birdsong for a Murderer" (June 22, 1952)
- "Death for sale" (July 13, 1952)

=== Appearances on Creeps By Night ===
Karloff acted in ten episodes on this 1944 radio anthology series

- "The Voice of Death" (Feb. 15, 1944)
- "The Man With the Devil's Hands" (Feb. 22, 1944)
- Unknown title (Mar. 7, 1944)
- "Dark Destiny" (Mar. 14, 1944)
- Unknown title (Mar. 21, 1944)
- "The String of Pearls" (Mar. 28, 1944)
- Unknown title (April 18, 1944)
- Unknown title (April 25, 1944)
- "The Final Reckoning" (May 2, 1944)
- "The Hunt" (May 9, 1944)

=== Appearances on Starring Boris Karloff ===
Karloff acted in 13 episodes of the "Starring Boris Karloff" anthology TV/ radio series in 1949: this show was broadcast as both a TV show and a radio show simultaneously

- "Five Golden Guineas" (Sept. 21, 1949)
- "The Mask" (Sept. 28, 1949)
- "Mungahara" (Oct. 5, 1949)
- "Mad Illusion" (Oct. 12, 1949)
- "Perchance To Dream" (Oct. 19, 1949)
- "The Devil Takes a Bride" (Oct. 26, 1949)
- "The Moving Finger" (Nov. 2, 1949)
- "The Twisted Path" (Nov. 9, 1949)
- "False Face" (Nov. 16, 1949)
- "Cranky Bill" (Nov. 23, 1949)
- "Three O'Clock" (Nov. 30, 1949)
- "The Shop at Sly Corner" (Dec. 7, 1949)
- "The Night Reveals" (Dec. 14, 1949)

== See also ==
- Grammy Award for Best Album for Children
- Karloff, 2014 one-man play by Randy Bowser
