= Isle of the Snake People =

Snake People
- U.K. theatrical release poster
- Directed by: Juan Ibáñez; Jack Hill
- Written by: Jack Hill; Luis Enrique Vergara
- Produced by: Juan Ibáñez; Luis Enrique Vergara
- Starring: Boris Karloff; Julissa
- Cinematography: Raúl Domínguez
- Edited by: J. Gamma
- Distributed by: Columbia Pictures
- Release date: March 1971
- Running time: 90 minutes
- Country: Mexico
- Languages: Spanish; English

Snake People a.k.a. La muerte viviente and Isle of the Snake People, is a 1971 Mexican horror film directed by Juan Ibáñez and starring Boris Karloff and Julissa. It was filmed in May 1968, but was only released theatrically in March 1971, 2 years after Karloff had died.

Snake People is one of four low-budget Mexican horror films Karloff made in a package deal with Mexican producer Luis Enrique Vergara. The others are Fear Chamber, The Incredible Invasion, and House of Evil. Karloff's scenes for all four films were directed by Jack Hill in Los Angeles in the spring of 1968. The films were then completed in Mexico.

The film was produced by Juan Ibáñez for Azteca Films. The film was released as La muerte viviente [The Living Dead] in Mexico and in the United States in Spanish-language theatres only. It was eventually dubbed in English but received little theatrical distribution, and was then released direct to U.S. television in 1971 as Isle of the Snake People. The film is also known as Cult of the Dead (in Hungary) and Snake People (in the United Kingdom).

== Plot ==
Captain Labische arrives at a remote island, determined to crack down on the island's lawlessness, spurred by the voodoo rites practiced by the evil priest Damballah. Labische starts with local tycoon Carl van Molder and his study of the island. Van Molder warns Labische not to interfere with the local populace. Annabella, van Molder's visiting niece, is a temperance crusader who wants her uncle to help fund the International Anti-Saloon League. She falls in love with handsome police lieutenant Andrew Wilhelm, despite his fondness for rum. Meanwhile, beautiful native girls are being transformed into zombies, and a sinister snake dancer named Kalea leads them to attack and devour any meddling policemen who get too close to their unholy rituals. In a dream, Annabella wakes up in a coffin. Another woman who looks like her is in a second coffin with a snake. The lookalike pursues and then kisses her. When Annabella is kidnapped and prepared to be the cult's latest human sacrifice, Labische and Wilhelm have to infiltrate their ranks to save her, and they finally learn the secret identity of the all-powerful Damballah.

== Cast ==
- Boris Karloff – Carl van Molder / Damballah
- Julissa – Anabella Vandenberg
- Carlos East – Lt. Andrew Wilhelm (as Charles East)
- Rafael Bertrand – Capt. Pierre Labische (as Ralph Bertrand)
- Yolanda Montes «Tongolele» – Kalea (as Tongolele)
- Quintin Bulnes – Klinsor
- Santanón (actor) – Santanon the Dwarf
- Julia Marichal – Mary Ann Vandenberg (as July Marichael)
- Quintin Miller – Gomez (uncredited)

== Production ==
Isle of the Snake People is one of four low-budget Mexican horror films Karloff made in a package deal with Mexican producer Luis Enrique Vergara, the others being The Incredible Invasion, Fear Chamber, and House of Evil. With Karloff signed, Vergara obtained financing for the four films from Columbia Pictures, which would then distribute them. Karloff received $100,000 per film. Karloff initially rejected the scripts for all of the films, but agreed to them after they were rewritten by Jack Hill.

Filming was planned to take place in Mexico, but Karloff's emphysema prevented him from working at that altitude. Karloff's scenes in all four films were directed by Jack Hill at the Dorad Studios in Los Angeles in the spring of 1968. Between shots, Karloff rested in a wheelchair. The films were then completed in Mexico at Studios America Mexico by Juan Ibáñez. Some additional scenes involving the van Molder character were filmed using a Karloff stand-in named Jerry Petty. Due to the unexpected death of Vergara, the release of the film was held up to determine ownership rights of inheritance under Mexican law. All four films in the package deal were released well after Karloff's death in 1969.

== Reception ==
The four Azteca Films productions for which Karloff shot his scenes in Los Angeles were released by Columbia Pictures over a two-year period after he had died in 1969. They were dismissed, by critics and Karloff fans alike, as undistinguished efforts. This film, when released, also appeared to be dated and inferior as between its filming and release, another zombie film, Night of the Living Dead (1968), had raised the standards for the genre. Writing in The Zombie Movie Encyclopedia, academic Peter Dendle said, "Though sometimes strange to the point of psychedelic, this tame offering consists of interminable scenes of native rites, women trying to look seductively evil, and shots of snakes."

== See also ==
- List of American films of 1971
- Boris Karloff filmography
