= Julissa =

Mexican actress, producer, and singer

- Born: Julia Isabel de Llano Macedo; 8 April 1944 (age 82); Mexico City, Mexico
- Other names: Julissa Herrera; Julisa Macedo; Julissa del Llano
- Occupations: Actress, producer, singer
- Years active: 1960-present
- Spouse: Benny Ibarra (?–?) (divorced)
- Children: Benny (b. 1970); Alejandro (b. 1973)
- Parent(s): Luis de Llano Palmer; Rita Macedo
- Relatives: Luis de Llano Macedo (brother)

Julia Isabel de Llano Macedo (born 8 April 1944), known professionally as Julissa, is a Mexican actress, producer, and singer. She is the daughter of radio and television host Luis de Llano Palmer and actress Rita Macedo. Her children include Benny Ibarra, a singer and musician, and Alejandro Ibarra, an actor and singer. Her brother, Luis de Llano Macedo, has worked as a producer for Televisa.

== Early life and career ==
=== Music ===
At age 14, Julissa began a singing career in a rock group called The Spitfires; it was formed by her brother, Luis. She won 2nd place in a radio competition before she was signed to a contract by CBS and she recorded rock albums from 1961 to 1964. She recorded a single, Corazón Salvaje / Te Necesito, released on Capitol Records in 1966. Julissa gave a new air to the original song "Teacher's Pet" by Doris Day, by reinterpreting it in the song "La favorita del profesor" ("The Teacher's Favorite").

=== Theatre ===
She started to act and then started a career where she is a leading theatre producer in Mexico bringing into the country well-known Broadway productions such as Jesus Christ Superstar, Grease, Joseph and the Amazing Technicolor Dreamcoat, Pippin.

She was a cast member of the 1975 Mexico production of The Rocky Horror Show; a young Aida Pierce was a chorus member.

== Filmography ==
=== Films ===
Year	Title	Role	Notes
1962	Espiritismo	Rosario	(credited as Julisa Macedo)
1963	La Maldición de la Llorona	Female Stagecoach Passenger	(credited as Julissa del Llano) other title - The Curse of the Crying Woman
1964	Prohibido Soñar		
1964	The Age of Violence		other title - La Edad de la Violencia(original title)
1964	En la Mitad del Mundo		(credited as Julissa Herrera)
1964	Los Novias de Mis Hijas	Maria	
1964	El Robo al Tren Correo		
1965	El Pueblo Fantasma		other title - Ghost Town
1965	Diablos en el Cielo		
1965	Sinful	Lidia	other title - El Pecador (original title)
1965	Nacidos Para Cantar		
1965	El Dengue del Amor		
1965	Las dos Elenas	Elena	
1966	Una Señora Estupenda	Mercedes	
1966	Nosotros los Jóvenes	Carmen	
1966	Tirando a Gol		
1966	Me Cansé de Rogarle		
1967	Pedro Páramo	Ana Rentería	
1967	Si Quiero		
1967	Qué hombre tan sin embargo	Laura	
1967	Juego Peligroso	Claudia (segment "HO")	
1967	The Outsiders	Paloma	other title - Los Caifanes (original title)
1967	The Crazy World of the Young		other title - El Mundo Loco de los Jóvenes (original title)
1968	Fear Chamber	Corinne Mandel	
1968	House of Evil	Lucy Durant	
1968	The Adolescents		other title - The Adolescentes (original title)
1968	Despedida de Casada	Sonia Vargas	
1968	A Wedding Night Essay		other title - Ensayo de una Noche de Bodas (original title)
1969	Santa	Santa	
1969	Paula		
1970	La Mentira		
1971	Isle of the Snake People	Anabella Vandenberg	other titles - La Muerte Viviente (original title), Snake People
1971	Verano Ardiente	Marilu/Maria de la Luz Flores	other title - Hot Summer
1972	Una Mujer Honesta		
1972	Tú, Yo, Nosotros		Nominated – Ariel Award for Best Actress
1972	Victoria		
1973	Las Cautivas	Lucía Gómez	
1979	Amor Libre		
1981	La Pachange	Adela, Vicente's Wife	
1981	Oficio de Tinieblas		
1981	D.F./Distrito Federal		Ariel Award for Best Supporting Actress
1982	Aquel Famoso Remington		
1982	Días de Combate	Elisa	
1982	41, el hombre perfecto	Clarissa Machorro	
1982	Los Ojos de un Niño	Patricia	
1982	Cosa Fácil	Elisa Belascoaran	
1983	Los dos Carnales		
1984	Prohibido Amar en Nueva York		
1986	Más allá de la Muerte	Andrea/Laura	
1994	Amor que Mata		
2004	El Mago	Raquel	other title - The Magician
2005	Rencor	Gertrudis Alcocer	

=== Television ===
Year	Title	Role	Notes
1962	Las momias de Guanajuato		
1963	Doña Macabra		
1964	Premier Orfeón		
1964	La intrusa	Verónica	
1964	Casa de vecinidad	Lupe	
1964	Estrellas		
1965	La mentira	Verónica	
1966	Corazón salvaje	Mónica Molnar del Diablo	
1967	Frontera		
1969	Más allá de la muerte	Estela Ballesteros	
1971	Velo de novia		
1972-73	Hermanos Coraje	Clara Barros/Diana Lemos/Marcia	
1974	El manantial del milagro		
1976	Los bandidos del Río Frío	Cecilia	
1978-79	Cartas para una víctima		
1979-80	Verónica	Veronica	
1980-81	Colorina	Rita	
1986	Hora Marcada		
1987-88	Tal Como somos		also Producer
1987	La Indomable	-	Producer only
1988-89	Dulce desafío	-	Producer only
1989	Violencia a Sangre Fria		TV movie
1994-95	Agujetas de Color de Rosa	Lola	
1996	La sombra del otro	-	Producer only
2003-04	Velo de novia	Lia del Moral de Villaseñor	
2002	Desde Gayola	Luchis/ La Nena	
2004	ıDespierta América!	Herself	
2004	Cuatro Labios	Herself	
2005	100 Mexicanos Dijeron	Herself	1 episode - Padres vs Hijos
2005	Bajo el mismo techo	Julissa Acosta	1 episode - La Visita de la Tía July
2006	Premios TV y Novelas 2006	Herself	
2006	Nuestras Mejores Canciones	Marcela Andere de Méndez	
2006–07	La fea más bella	Teresita Sáenz de Mendiola	2 episodes
2007	Premios TV y Novelas 2007	Herself	
2008	Fuego en la sangre	Raquel Uribe	9 episodes
2009-10	Atrévete a soñar	Doña Cristina "Cristi" Jiménez vda. de Peralta	
2012-13	Porque el amor manda	Doña Susana Arriaga	
2014	Como dice el dicho	Gertrudis	Episode: "La avaricia y la ambición"

== Awards ==
=== Music ===
Year	Result	Award	Category
1990	Won	Golden and Platinum Discs	Album I (Mexico)
1991	Won	Golden Disc	Album I (Spain)
1991	Won	Golden Disc	Album II (Mexico)
1992	Won	The Eres Award	Best Youth Musical Group
1992	Won	Double Platinum Disc	Album I (Spain)
1992	Won	Golden Disc and Platinum Disc	Album II (Spain)
1993	Won	Golden Disc	Banda Rock (Mexico)
1993	Won	The Eres Award	Best Youth Musical Group of the Year
1994	Won	Furia Musical Award	Banda Rock
1994	Won	Double Golden Disc	El Album DOble (Spain)
1994	Won	Las Palms de Oro (Golden Palms) Award	
1995	Won	Golden Disc	The Album Hoy (Spain)

Julissa was inducted into the Paseo de las Luminarias in 1987 for her work in movies, television, theater and the recording industry, joining her parents. Her handprints would soon be joined by those of her brother; all four members of the De Llano-Macedo family have been honored in the Paseo.
