= The Incredible Invasion =

- Theatrical release poster
- Directed by: Luis Enrique Vergara; Jack Hill
- Starring: Boris Karloff
- Distributed by: Columbia Pictures
- Release date: April 1971
- Running time: 90 minutes
- Country: Mexico
- Language: English

The Incredible Invasion (Invasion siniestra/ The Sinister Invasion), also known as Alien Terror, is a 1971 Mexican science fiction film directed by Luis Enrique Vergara. It stars Boris Karloff, Yerye Beirute and Enrique Guzmán. It is the last film Karloff worked on before his death in 1969. It was filmed in May 1968, but was only released theatrically in 1971, 2 years after Karloff had died.

Incredible Invasion is one of four low-budget Mexican horror films Karloff made in a package deal with Mexican producer Luis Enrique Vergara. The others are Isle of the Snake People, Fear Chamber, and House of Evil. Karloff's scenes for all four films were directed by Jack Hill in Los Angeles in the spring of 1968. The films were then completed in Mexico.

== Plot ==
Gudenberg, 1890: Professor John Mayer has invented a ray gun which runs on nuclear power. During testing, a ray is shot into space and attracts the attention of a flying saucer. The aliens decide to come to Earth to destroy the weapon...

== Cast ==
- Boris Karloff as Prof. John Mayer
- Enrique Guzmán as Dr. Paul Rosten
- Christa Linder as Laura
- Maura Monti as Dr. Isabel Reed
- Yerye Beirute as Thomas
- Tere Valez as Nancy
- Sergio Kleiner as Alien
- Tito Novaro as Gen. Nord

== Production ==
Karloff's advanced age was noticeable on the film; regarding his health status, Michael J. Weldon in The Encyclopedia of Film noted, "The ill, 81-year-old horror star is always shown sitting down or leaning against a support of some kind."

== Reception ==
AllMovie's synopsis of the film states, "The filmmakers barely had enough talent to adhere to the simplest of storylines, much less this hodgepodge of cut-rate H. G. Wells posturing and sleazy exploitation." James O'Neil in Terror on Tape called The Incredible Invasion "one of the four awful low-budget U.S.-Mexican co-productions the great actor [Boris Karloff] filmed a few months prior to his death in 1969." Michael R. Pitts in Columbia Pictures Horror, Science Fiction and Fantasy Films, 1928–1982 said that "While Karloff is quite good as the scientist and Christa Linder is strikingly beautiful as his niece, the overall production is labored", and that "[w]hile not as bad as Fear Chamber or House of Evil, The Incredible Invasion must rank as one of Karloff's worst cinema outings."

== See also ==
- List of Mexican films of 1971
- Boris Karloff filmography
