= Luis Enrique Vergara =

Mexican film producer and screenwriter

- Born: Luis Enrique Vergara Cabrera; 13 May 1922; Mexico City, Mexico
- Died: 2 February 1970 (aged 47); Distrito Federal, Mexico
- Resting place: Mexico City
- Spouse: Leonor Aguado
- Children: 1

Luis Enrique Vergara (13 May 1922 – 2 February 1970) was a Mexican film producer and screenwriter who made low-budget horror and monster movies from 1950 to 1971. In attempt to please all film goers, he combined monsters and horror with action, sex, science fiction, and comedy. To save money, he often wrote the screenplay as well as producing the films from his Filmica Vergara Cinecomisiones, a film production company he founded in 1952.

During the two decades that Vergara wrote and produced films he worked with actors and actresses including Susana Dosamantes, Macaria, Altia Michel, Isela Vega, John Carradine, and Boris Karloff. He produced the last four films in which Boris Karloff appeared: The Snake People, The Incredible Invasion, Fear Chamber, and House of Evil. Bill Warren, the science-fiction historian, was on the set during the filming; he reported that Vergara forced the director of the American sequences Jack Hill to tie down with a rope “an early portable video camera to the top of the 35mm Mitchell he was using as his principal camera”, a relatively early example of the "video assist" which is now standard practice in commercial film production. Due to his unexpected death, the release of the Karloff films was held up due to ownership rights of inheritance under Mexican law.

== Filmography ==
=== As a screenwriter ===
- El jugador (1953) (credited as Luis Enrique Vergara Cabrera)
- El Anima del Ahorcado contra el Latigo Negro (1959) (third film in a series of three; credited with the story)
- El imperio de Drácula (1967) (credited as L.E. Vergara C.)
- La sombra del murciélago (1968) (credited as L.E. Vergara C.)
- Fear Chamber (1968)
- House of Evil (1968)
- Arañas infernales (1968) (original idea; credited as L.E. Vergara)
- Isle of the Snake People (1971)
- The Incredible Invasion (1971)

=== As a producer ===
- Tierra muerta (1949)
- Traigo mi 45 (1952) (credited as Luis Enrique Vergara Cabrera)
- El jugador (1953) (credited as Luis Enrique Cabrera)
- El misterio del látigo (1958)
- El látigo negro (1958) (credited as Luis Enrique Cabrera)
- El látigo (1958)
- El ánima del ahorcado contra el latigo (1959)
- El hacha diabólica (1965) (as Luis Enrique Vergara C.)
- Demonio azul (1965)
- El misterio de Huracan Ramirez (1962)
- Profanadores de tumbas (1966)
- Blue Demon vs. el poder satánico (1966) (as Luis Enrique Vergara Cabrera)
- El imperio de Drácula (1967) (as Luis Enrique Vergara C.)
- El barón Brakola (1967) (as Luis Enrique Vergara C.)
- Demonios sobre ruedas (1967)
- Noches prohibidas (1968)
- Atacan las brujas (1968) (as Luis Enrique Vergara C.)
- Arañas infernales (1968) (as Luis Enrique Vergara C.)
- Los canallas (1968)
- Los Asesinos (1968) (last film starred by Nick Adams)
- La sombra del murciélago (1968) (credited as Luis Enrique Vergara G.)
- Fear Chamber (1968)
- House of Evil (1968)
- El satánico (1968)
- Super Colt 38 (1969)
- Paula (1969)
- Pacto diabólico (1969)
- Mil máscaras (1969)
- Las vampiras (1969) (as Luis Enrique Vergara C.)
- La señora Muerte (1969) (as Luis Enrique Vergara C.)
- Enigma de muerte (1969) (as Luis Enrique Vergara C.)
- Matrimonio y Sexo (1970)
- Isle of the Snake People (1971) (credited as Henry Verg)
- The Incredible Invasion (1971)
