= Spencer Charters =

American actor (1875–1943)

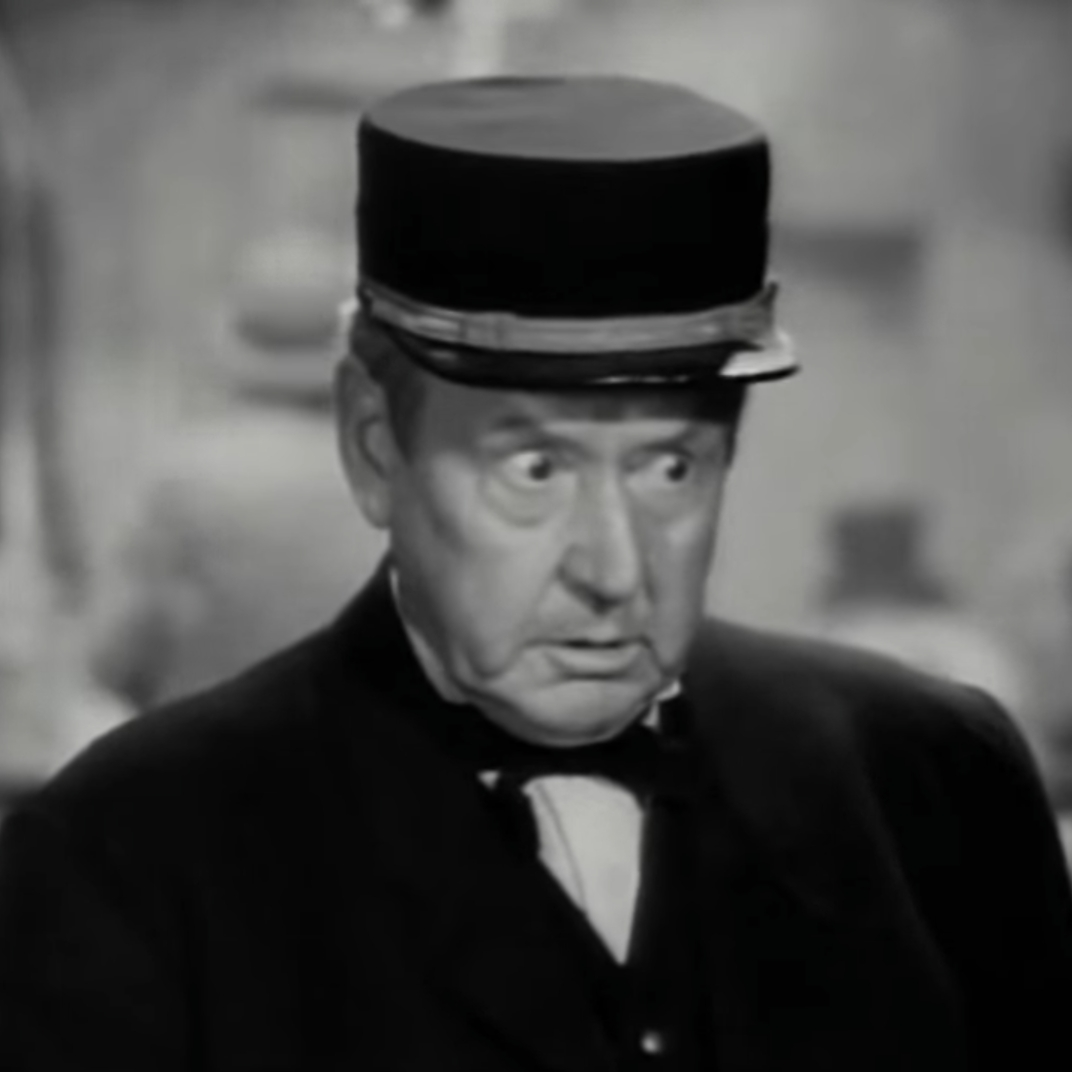
- Charters in Santa Fe Trail (1940)
- Born: March 25, 1875; Duncannon, Pennsylvania, U.S.
- Died: January 25, 1943 (aged 67); Hollywood, California, U.S.
- Resting place: Forest Lawn Memorial Park, Glendale, California
- Occupation: Actor
- Years active: 1910–1943
- Spouse: Irene M. Charters (m. 1913; died 1941)
- Children: 1

Spencer Charters (March 25, 1875 – January 25, 1943) was an American film actor. He appeared in more than 220 films between 1920 and 1943, mostly in small supporting roles.

== Biography ==
Charters was born in Duncannon, Pennsylvania. Until around 1890 he worked as a machinist for the Chesapeake Nail Works in Harrisburg, Pennsylvania, and had little interest in acting. He soon appeared on stage after leaving school with a walk-on part, but it wasn't long before he was being given fair-sized roles. He played on Broadway between 1910 and 1929 and was a busy character actor in films during the 1930s and early 1940s. He often portrayed somewhat befuddled judges, doctors, clerks, managers, and jailers.

Charters was married to actress Irene Myers until her death December 22, 1941.

He died by suicide from a mix of sleeping pills and carbon monoxide poisoning. He is buried in Forest Lawn Memorial Park, Glendale, California.

== Filmography ==
Year	Title	Role	Director	Notes
1920	April Folly	Dobbs	Robert Z. Leonard	
1920	Number 17			
1923	Little Old New York	Bunny	Sidney Olcott	
1924	Janice Meredith	Squire Hennion	E. Mason Hopper; E. J. Babille (assistant)	
1926	Dancing Mothers	Butter and Egg Man	Herbert Brenon	
1930	Whoopee!	Jerome Underwood	Thornton Freeland	
1930	The Bat Whispers	The Caretaker	Roland West	
1931	Lonely Wives	Andrews, the Butler	Russell Mack	
1931	The Front Page	Woodenshoes	Lewis Milestone	
1931	Ex-Bad Boy	Henry Simmons	Vin Moore	
1931	Traveling Husbands	Joe	Paul Sloane; Charles Kerr (assistant)	
1931	Palmy Days	Mr. Clark	A. Edward Sutherland	
1932	Union Depot	Police Officer Bert Brady	Alfred E. Green	Uncredited
1932	The Heart of New York	The Doorman	Mervyn LeRoy	Uncredited
1932	The Famous Ferguson Case	Fire Chief	Lloyd Bacon	Uncredited
1932	The Tenderfoot	Oscar	Ray Enright	
1932	Jewel Robbery	Lenz	William Dieterle	
1932	Movie Crazy	J.L. O'Brien	Clyde Bruckman; Harold Lloyd (uncredited)	
1932	Two Against the World	Doorman	Archie Mayo	Uncredited
1932	Hold 'Em Jail	The Governor	Norman Taurog	
1932	The Crooked Circle	Kinny	H. Bruce Humberstone	
1932	Three on a Match	Street Cleaner	Mervyn LeRoy	Uncredited
1932	Central Park	Police Sergeant Riley	John G. Adolfi	Uncredited
1932	20,000 Years in Sing Sing	Officer Daniels	Michael Curtiz	Uncredited
1932	The Match King	Oscar	Howard Bretherton	
1933	Broadway Bad	Lew Gordon	Sidney Lanfield	Uncredited
1933	Gabriel Over the White House	Vice President	Gregory La Cava	Uncredited
1933	So This Is Africa	Doctor	Edward F. Cline	
1933	Song of the Eagle	Detective 'Bright Eyes'	Ralph Murphy	Uncredited
1933	Gambling Ship	Detective	Max Marcin	
1933	The Kennel Murder Case	Sgt. Snitkin	Michael Curtiz	Uncredited
1933	Female	Tom	William A. Wellman	
1933	From Headquarters	Teletype Man	William Dieterle	Uncredited
1933	Lady Killer	Los Angeles Cop	Roy Del Ruth	Uncredited
1933	Mr. Skitch	the Chump	James Cruze	Uncredited
1934	Hips, Hips, Hooray!	Clark	Mark Sandrich	
1934	Caravan	Flunkey	Erik Charell	Uncredited
1934	Fashions of 1934	Man Removing Telephone	William Dieterle	
1934	Wonder Bar	Pete	Busby Berkeley	
1934	Success at Any Price	Architect	J. Walter Ruben	Uncredited
1934	The Loudspeaker	Burroughs	Joseph Santley	
1934	Half a Sinner	Noel Cunningham	Kurt Neumann	
1934	The Circus Clown	Kingsley	Ray Enright	
1934	Blind Date	Pa Taylor	Roy William Neill	
1934	Million Dollar Ransom	Pop McGarry	Murray Roth	Uncredited
1934	The Pursuit of Happiness	Sam Evans	Alexander Hall	
1934	Wake Up and Dream	Earl Craft	Kurt Neumann	
1934	The St. Louis Kid	Messeldopp	Ray Enright	
1934	The Firebird	the Porter	William Dieterle	
1934	It's a Gift	Gate Guard	Norman Z. McLeod	
1934	The Ghost Walks	Guard #1	Frank R. Strayer	
1934	The Secret Bride	Second Diner	William Dieterle	Uncredited
1935	Romance in Manhattan	Marriage License Clerk	Stephen Roberts	Uncredited
1935	Murder on a Honeymoon	Chief Of Police Britt	Lloyd Corrigan	
1935	The Nut Farm	the Landlord	Melville W. Brown	
1935	Star of Midnight	Hotel Doorman	Stephen Roberts; James Anderson (assistant)	Uncredited
1935	Eight Bells	Walker	Roy William Neill	
1935	Whispering Smith Speaks	Cal Stone	David Howard	
1935	Alibi Ike	Minister	Ray Enright	
1935	Stranded	Boatman	Frank Borzage	
1935	The Raven	Geoffrey	Lew Landers	Credits
1935	Don't Bet on Blondes	Doc	Robert Florey	
1935	Welcome Home	Constable Mulhausen	James Tinling	
1935	The Gay Deception	Banker	William Wyler	Uncredited
1935	The Goose and the Gander	Winkelsteinberger	Alfred E. Green	
1935	1,000 Dollars a Minute	Stevens	Aubrey Scotto	Uncredited
1935	In Person	Parson Calverton Lunk	William A. Seiter; James Anderson (assistant)	
1936	Don't Get Personal	Mr. Charles van Ranseleer	William Nigh	
1936	The Preview Murder Mystery	Watchman	Robert Florey	
1936	Love on a Bet	Plaza Ritz Hotel Owner	Leigh Jason	
1936	The Farmer in the Dell	Milkman	Ben Holmes	
1936	Boulder Dam	First Sheriff	Frank McDonald	Uncredited
1936	Colleen	Doctor Frothingham	Alfred E. Green	Uncredited
1936	Till We Meet Again	Herr Hoffer	Robert Florey	
1936	Mr. Deeds Goes to Town	Mal	Frank Capra	Uncredited
1936	The Moon's Our Home	Abner Simpson	William A. Seiter	
1936	Murder on a Bridle Path	Warden Sylvester Mahoney	Edward Killy	
1936	The Harvester	Stubby Pratt	Joseph Santley	
1936	F-Man	Sheriff Hank 'One Gun' Groder	Edward F. Cline	
1936	The Mine with the Iron Door	Thad Hill	David Howard	
1936	Let's Sing Again		Kurt Neumann	Uncredited
1936	The Ex-Mrs. Bradford	Dr. Bunting, Coroner	Stephen Roberts	Uncredited
1936	The Bride Walks Out	Marriage Bureau Justice of the Peace	Leigh Jason	Uncredited
1936	Spendthrift	Col. Barnaby	Raoul Walsh	
1936	36 Hours to Kill	Mr. Hutchins	Eugene Forde	Uncredited
1936	My American Wife	Engineer	Harold Young	Uncredited
1936	Back to Nature	Deputy Sheriff Putney	James Tinling	Uncredited
1936	Postal Inspector	Grumpy	Otto Brower	
1936	The Texas Rangers	Sheriff Jake	King Vidor	Uncredited
1936	Libeled Lady	Magistrate	Jack Conway	
1936	All American Chump	Abiah Smith	Edwin L. Marin	
1936	Fugitive in the Sky	Henry Staeger	Nick Grinde	
1936	Four Days' Wonder	Gilroy	Sidney Salkow	
1936	Banjo on My Knee	Judge Tope	John Cromwell	
1936	Career Woman	Coroner McInery	Lewis Seiler	
1936	Lady from Nowhere	Alexander Scorzo	Gordon Wiles	
1937	The Mighty Treve	Watling	Lewis D. Collins	
1937	Dangerous Number	Justice of the Peace	Richard Thorpe	Uncredited
1937	They Wanted to Marry	Police Turnkey	Lew Landers	Uncredited
1937	Waikiki Wedding	Frame	Frank Tuttle	Uncredited
1937	Girl Loves Boy	Rufus Boggs	W. Duncan Mansfield	
1937	Venus Makes Trouble	Joel Willard	Gordon Wiles	
1937	Pick a Star	Judge	Edward Sedgwick	
1937	Fifty Roads to Town	George Hession	Norman Taurog	
1937	Mountain Music	Justice of the Peace Sharody	Robert Florey	
1937	Married Before Breakfast	Fireman	Edwin L. Marin	Uncredited
1937	Ever Since Eve	Monteray Tavern Porter	Lloyd Bacon	Uncredited
1937	The Emperor's Candlesticks	Usher		Uncredited
1937	She Had to Eat	Alf Franklin	Malcolm St. Clair	Uncredited
1937	Make a Wish	Station Agent	Kurt Neumann	
1937	The Prisoner of Zenda	Railroad Porter	John Cromwell; W. S. Van Dyke (uncredited)	Uncredited
1937	Wife, Doctor and Nurse	Uncle	Walter Lang	
1937	Back in Circulation	The Sheriff	Ray Enright	
1937	Behind the Mike	Pete Jones	Sidney Salkow	
1937	Danger – Love at Work	Hick	Otto Preminger	
1937	The Perfect Specimen	Stationmaster	Michael Curtiz	Uncredited
1937	The Hurricane	Judge	John Ford	Uncredited
1937	Big Town Girl	Isaiah Wickenback	Alfred L. Werker	
1937	Checkers	Zeb	H. Bruce Humberstone	
1937	Lady Behave!	Innkeeper	Lloyd Corrigan	
1937	Wells Fargo	Old Confederate	Frank Lloyd	Uncredited
1937	The Bad Man of Brimstone	Rufus Odlum	J. Walter Ruben	Uncredited
1938	In Old Chicago	Commissioner W.J. Beavers	Henry King	
1938	The Jury's Secret	Old Man	Edward Sloman	Uncredited
1938	Mr. Boggs Steps Out	Angus Tubbs	Gordon Wiles	
1938	Forbidden Valley	Dr. Scudd	Wyndham Gittens	
1938	Joy of Living	Magistrate	Tay Garnett	
1938	Vivacious Lady	Henpecked Husband Shaving on Train	George Stevens	Uncredited
1938	Crime School	Old Doctor	Lewis Seiler	
1938	One Wild Night	Lem Halliday	Eugene Forde	
1938	Three Comrades	Herr Schultz	Frank Borzage	Uncredited
1938	Three Blind Mice	Hendricks	William A. Seiter	
1938	Professor Beware	Sheriff Henry Sweatt	Elliott Nugent	Uncredited
1938	Four's a Crowd	Charlie	Michael Curtiz	Uncredited
1938	Mr. Chump	Mr. Koeper	William Clemens	
1938	The Texans	Chairman	James P. Hogan	Uncredited
1938	The Road to Reno	The Judge	S. Sylvan Simon	
1938	Valley of the Giants	Fireman #1	William Keighley	Uncredited
1938	Breaking the Ice	Farmer Smith	Edward F. Cline	
1938	Stablemates	Choirmaster	Sam Wood	Uncredited
1938	Five of a Kind	Rev. Matthew Brand	Herbert I. Leeds	
1938	Spring Madness	Police Chief	S. Sylvan Simon	Uncredited
1938	Strange Faces	Mason City Sheriff	Errol Taggart	
1938	The Law West of Tombstone	El Paso Judge Tom Moseby	Glenn Tryon	Uncredited
1938	Topper Takes a Trip	Judge	Norman Z. McLeod	
1939	Jesse James	Minister	Henry King	
1939	Boy Trouble	Grocer Bradley	George Archainbaud	
1939	St. Louis Blues	Judge	Raoul Walsh	Uncredited
1939	Woman Doctor	Veterinarian	Sidney Salkow	
1939	Yes, My Darling Daughter	Angus Dibble	William Keighley	
1939	Inside Story	Uncle Ben Perkins	Ricardo Cortez	
1939	I'm from Missouri	Charley Shook, Mule Breeder	Theodore Reed	
1939	They Made Her a Spy	Lucius	Jack Hively; Edward Donahue	
1939	Dodge City	Reverend	Michael Curtiz	Uncredited
1939	The Lady and the Mob	Bank Guard	Benjamin Stoloff	Uncredited
1939	The Flying Irishman	Mr. Smedley	Leigh Jason	Uncredited
1939	Hotel Imperial	Visoff		Uncredited
1939	The Kid from Texas	Deputy Sheriff Serving Attachment Papers	S. Sylvan Simon	Uncredited
1939	Women in the Wind	Farmer	John Farrow	
1939	They Asked for It	Chief Lawson	Frank McDonald	
1939	Unmarried	Judge	Kurt Neumann	Uncredited
1939	Exile Express	Justice of the Peace Henry P. Smith	Otis Garrett	
1939	Young Mr. Lincoln	Judge Herbert A. Bell	John Ford	
1939	Unexpected Father	Magistrate	Charles Lamont	
1939	Second Fiddle	Joe Clayton	Sidney Lanfield	
1939	In Name Only	Gardener	John Cromwell	
1939	The Under-Pup	Druggist	Richard Wallace	
1939	Dust Be My Destiny	Jailer	Lewis Seiler	Uncredited
1939	No Place to Go	Old Soldier	Terry O. Morse	Uncredited
1939	Drums Along the Mohawk	Innkeeper	John Ford	
1939	The Covered Trailer	Sheriff	Gus Meins	
1939	Two Thoroughbreds	Doc Purdy	Jack Hively	
1939	The Hunchback of Notre Dame	Court Clerk	William Dieterle	
1939	The Oklahoma Kid		Lloyd Bacon	Uncredited
1940	Remember the Night	Judge at Rummage Sale	Mitchell Leisen	
1940	He Married His Wife	Mayer	Roy Del Ruth	
1940	Virginia City	Sazerac Saloon Bartender	Michael Curtiz	Uncredited
1940	The Doctor Takes a Wife	Justice of the Peace	Alexander Hall	Uncredited
1940	Alias the Deacon	Sheriff Yates	Christy Cabanne	
1940	Our Town	Constable Warren	Sam Wood	
1940	Lucky Cisco Kid	Hotel Guest	H. Bruce Humberstone	Uncredited
1940	Three Faces West	Dr. 'Nunk' Atterbury	Bernard Vorhaus	
1940	Maryland	Judge	Henry King	
1940	Girl from God's Country	Dealer	Sidney Salkow	
1940	The Boys from Syracuse	Turnkey	A. Edward Sutherland	
1940	The Golden Fleecing	Justice of Peace	Leslie Fenton	
1940	Calling All Husbands	Station Agent	Noel M. Smith	Uncredited
1940	Blondie Plays Cupid	Uncle Abner	Frank R. Strayer	
1940	Friendly Neighbors	Bumblebee Hibbs	Nick Grinde	
1940	Meet the Missus	Grandpa	Malcolm St. Clair	
1940	She Couldn't Say No	Hank Woodcock	William Clemens	
1940	Santa Fe Trail	Conductor	Michael Curtiz	
1940	Kitty Foyle	Father	Sam Wood	(scenes deleted)
1941	So Ends Our Night	Swiss Policeman	John Cromwell	
1941	High Sierra	Ed	Raoul Walsh	
1941	Petticoat Politics	Grandpa	Erle Kenton	
1941	Tobacco Road	County Clerk	John Ford	
1941	The Lady from Cheyenne	Dr. McGuinness	Frank Lloyd	
1941	The Singing Hill	Judge Henry Starrbottle	Lew Landers	
1941	Moon Over Miami	Postman	Walter Lang	
1941	Bad Men of Missouri	Clem	Ray Enright	Uncredited
1941	Hold That Ghost	Storekeeper	Arthur Lubin	Uncredited
1941	Man at Large	Mr. Gallon	Eugene Forde	
1941	They Died with Their Boots On	Station Master	Raoul Walsh	Uncredited
1941	Look Who's Laughing	Motel Manager	Allan Dwan	
1941	Glamour Boy	Hillbilly Gas Station Attendant	Ralph Murphy	Uncredited
1941	Mr. District Attorney in the Carter Case	Judge White	Bernard Vorhaus	
1941	Bedtime Story	Gas Station Attendant	Alexander Hall	Uncredited
1941	Pacific Blackout	Cornelius—Garage Night Watchman	Ralph Murphy	
1942	Right to the Heart	Jonah	Eugene Forde	
1942	The Remarkable Andrew	Dr. Clarence Upjohn	Stuart Heisler	
1942	The Night Before the Divorce	Small Town Judge	Robert Siodmak	
1942	The Affairs of Jimmy Valentine	Cheevers Snow	Bernard Vorhaus	
1942	Dr. Broadway	Oscar Titus	Anthony Mann	
1942	Yankee Doodle Dandy	Colony Opera House Stage Manager	Michael Curtiz	Uncredited
1942	Juke Girl	Keeno	Curtis Bernhardt	
1942	Tombstone, the Town Too Tough to Die	Judge Fred Horgan	William C. McGann	
1942	The Postman Didn't Ring	Judge Ben Holt	Harold D. Schuster	
1942	The Pride of the Yankees	Mr. Larsen	Sam Wood	Uncredited
1942	Scattergood Survives a Murder	Sheriff	Christy Cabanne; Ridgeway Callow (assistant)	
1942	Silver Queen	Doc Stonebraker	Lloyd Bacon	
1943	Slightly Dangerous	Claudius Swade - Owner of Motel	Buster Keaton	Uncredited
1944	Arsenic and Old Lace	Marriage License Clerk	Frank Capra	Uncredited, (final film role)
