= Brian Donlevy =

American actor (1901–1972)

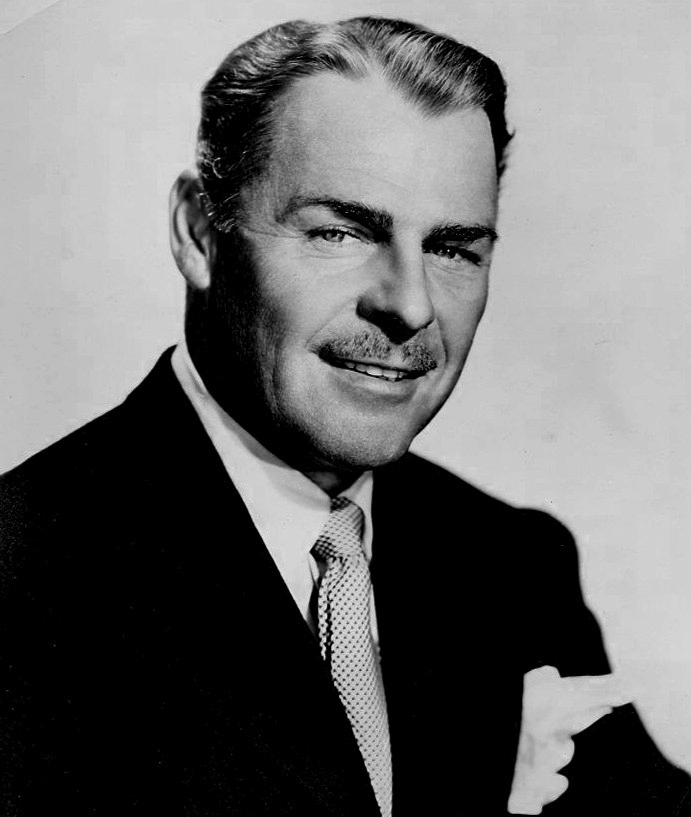
- Donlevy, 1955
- Born: Waldo Brian Donlevy; February 9, 1901; County Armagh, Ireland or Cleveland, Ohio, U.S.
- Died: April 6, 1972 (aged 71); Los Angeles, California, U.S.
- Occupation: Actor
- Years active: 1924–1969
- Spouses: Yvonne Grey (m. 1928; div. 1936) Marjorie Lane (m. 1936; div. 1947) Lillian Lugosi (m. 1966)
- Children: 1
- Awards: See below
- Military career
- Allegiance: United States
- Branch: Wisconsin Army National Guard; United States Army
- Service years: 1916–19
- Rank: Private first class
- Units: C Company, 127th Infantry Regiment, 32nd Infantry Division
- Conflicts: Pancho Villa Expedition; World War I

Waldo Brian Donlevy (February 9, 1901 – April 6, 1972) was an American actor of film, stage, television, and radio. He appeared both in leading and supporting roles in Hollywood, and was noted for playing dangerous and tough "heavies", often in films noir. He was nominated for an Academy Award for Best Supporting Actor for his role in Beau Geste (1939).

Donlevy was also known for starring as Steve Mitchell on the radio/TV series Dangerous Assignment (1949–53), and for portraying Bernard Quatermass in the science-fiction horror films The Quatermass Xperiment (1955) and Quatermass 2 (1957), by Britain's Hammer Film Productions.

== Early life ==
Brian Donlevy was born on February 9, 1901. Different sources claim he was born in Cleveland, Ohio, or in County Armagh in present-day Northern Ireland. His parents were Thomas Donlevy and Rebecca (née Parks), Irish emigrants originally from Portadown, County Armagh. Sometime between 1910 and 1912, the family moved to Sheboygan Falls, Wisconsin, where Donlevy's father worked as a supervisor at the Brickner Woolen Mills.

In 1916, when he was 14 years old, Donlevy lied about his age in order to enlist in the Wisconsin Army National Guard. He served in the Pancho Villa Expedition as a bugler, and was later sent to Europe following American entry into World War I. He served in France as a member of C Company, 127th Infantry Regiment, 32nd Infantry Division. He was discharged in 1919 as a Private first class.

== Career ==
=== Broadway ===
Donlevy moved to New York City in his youth, where he modeled for illustrator J. C. Leyendecker, who produced illustrations for the famous Arrow Collar advertisements. His acting career began in the early 1920s, when he began appearing in theater productions, and eventually won parts in silent films.

He had small roles in the silent films Jamestown (1923), Damaged Hearts (1924), Monsieur Beaucaire (1924), The Eve of the Revolution (1924), and School for Wives (1925). He had a small role on Broadway in the play What Price Glory (1925), which was a big hit and ran for two years, establishing him as an actor. He was in the film A Man of Quality (1926).

On Broadway, he was in the popular musical Hit the Deck (1927–28), which ran for a year; then Ringside (1928), Rainbow (1928), and Queen Bee (1929). He had roles in the films Gentlemen of the Press (1929) and Mother's Boy (1929). On stage, he appeared in Up Pops the Devil (1930–31), Peter Flies High (1931), Society Girl (1931–32), The Inside Story (1932), and The Boy Friend (1932). He was in a film short with Ethel Merman, Ireno (1932); and another short with Ruth Etting, A Modern Cinderella (1932).

He returned to the stage for Three And One (1933) with Lilian Bond, a big personal success; No Questions Asked (1934); The Perfumed Lady (1934); and The Milky Way (1934). The latter led to him receiving a Hollywood offer to reprise his role in the film version, but he was unable to due to a production delay. He had a final Broadway success with Life Begins at 8:40 (1934) with Bert Lahr and Ray Bolger. After that show, Donlevy said "they were all signed for the movies. I thought that if they can make it, I'm going to take a crack too."

=== Hollywood ===
Donlevy's break came in 1935, when he was cast in the film Barbary Coast, directed by Howard Hawks and produced by Samuel Goldwyn. Later that year, he was cast in Mary Burns, Fugitive. In 1936, he received second billing in It Happened in Hollywood, and had a supporting role in Goldwyn's Strike Me Pink and Paramount's 13 Hours by Air.

=== "B" leading man ===
Donlevy had his first lead in a B movie at Fox, Human Cargo (1936), playing a wisecracking reporter opposite Claire Trevor. He followed it with other "B" lead roles: Half Angel (1936), High Tension (1936), 36 Hours to Kill (1936), Crack-Up (1936) with Peter Lorre, and Midnight Taxi (1937).

He had a supporting role in an "A" movie, This Is My Affair (1937), with Robert Taylor, Barbara Stanwyck and Victor McLaglen; then starred in another "B", Born Reckless (1937). He was in In Old Chicago (1938) and was teamed with Victor McLaglen in Battle of Broadway (1938) and We're Going to Be Rich (1938). He starred in Sharpshooters (1938), and was the lead villain in the studio's prestigious Jesse James (1939).

=== Paramount ===
Paramount used Donlevy for a key role in Cecil B. De Mille's Union Pacific (1939), stepping in for Charles Bickford. He stayed at that studio for Beau Geste (1939). His performance in Beau Geste as the ruthless Sergeant Markoff earned him a nomination for an Academy Award for Best Supporting Actor. Donlevy went to Columbia to star in a "B film", Behind Prison Gates (1939), and went to RKO for a support part in Allegheny Uprising (1939). He was the villain in Universal's Destry Rides Again (1939).

Donlevy was then given the title role in The Great McGinty (1940) at Paramount, the directorial debut of Preston Sturges. It was not a big hit, but was profitable and received excellent reviews, launching Sturges' directing career. Donlevy later reprised the role several times on radio and television.

At Universal, Donlevy was in When the Daltons Rode (1940), then went into Fox's Brigham Young: Frontiersman (1940). He was fourth-billed in I Wanted Wings (1941); then MGM borrowed him to support Robert Taylor in Billy the Kid (1941). At Universal, he was top-billed in South of Tahiti (1941), and supported Bing Crosby in Birth of the Blues (1942).

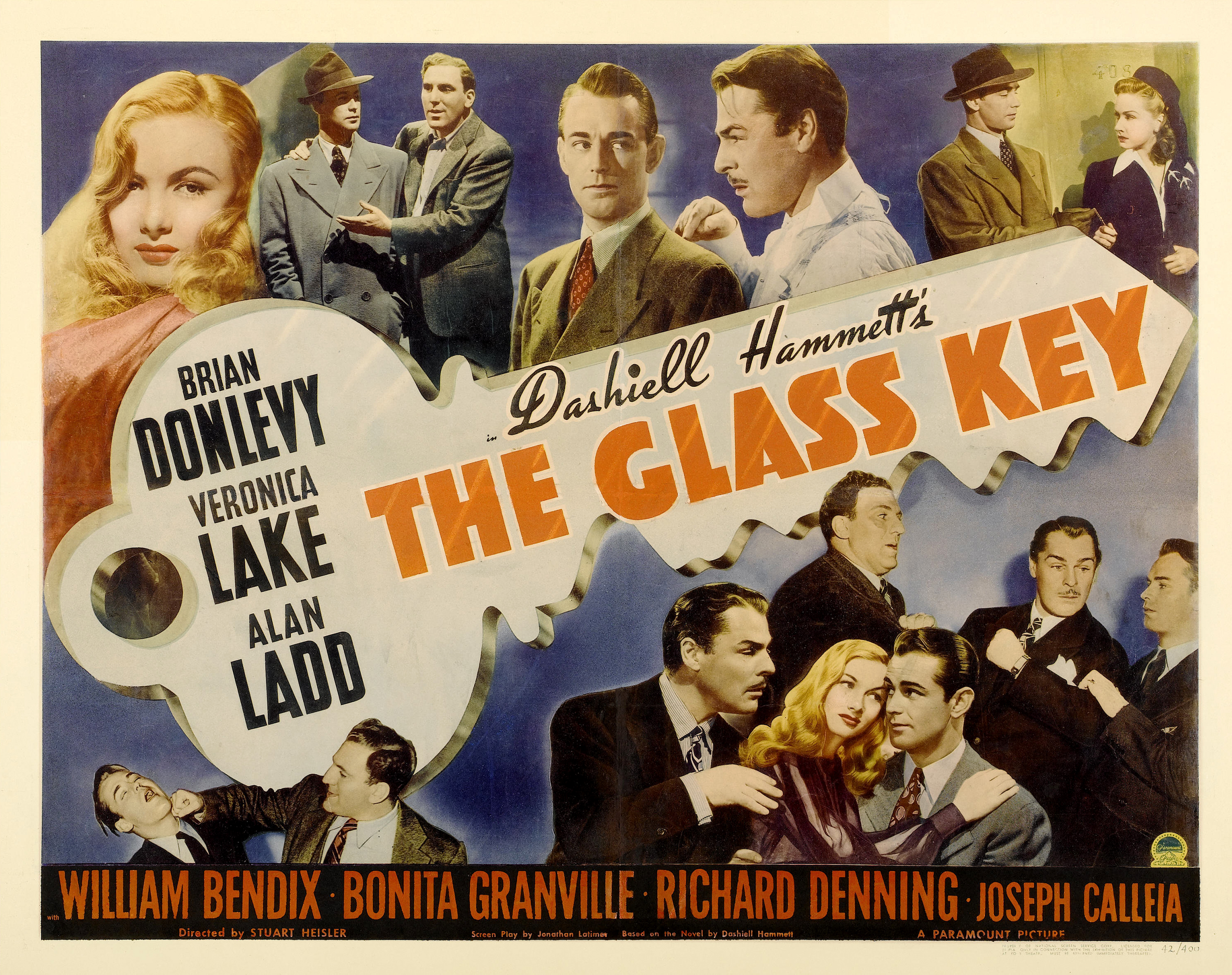
Lobby card for The Glass Key (1942)

Paramount gave him a star part in The Remarkable Andrew (1942), playing Andrew Jackson, then Columbia teamed him with Pat O'Brien in Two Yanks in Trinidad (1942). Edward Small hired him to play the lead in A Gentleman After Dark (1942) and he supported Joel McCrea and Barbara Stanwyck in Paramount's The Great Man's Lady (1942). In 1942, he starred in Wake Island with William Bendix and Robert Preston, playing a role based on James Devereux. The film, directed by John Farrow, was a huge success, as was the adaptation of Dashiell Hammet's classic The Glass Key (1942). At Universal, Donlevy starred in Nightmare (1942), and MGM borrowed him to support Taylor again in Stand By for Action (1942). Donlevy had the lead role in Fritz Lang's Hangmen Also Die! (1943), made for United Artists and co-written by Bertolt Brecht. He had a cameo as Governor McGinty in Sturges' The Miracle of Morgan's Creek (1944).

Donlevy was given the lead role in An American Romance (1944), directed by King Vidor for MGM, in a role intended for Spencer Tracy. It was a prestigious production, but the film was a box-office and critical disappointment. He had a cameo as himself in Duffy's Tavern (1945), and he was Trampas to Joel McCrea's The Virginian (1946). After playing the male lead in Our Hearts Were Growing Up (1946) he was borrowed by Walter Wanger for Canyon Passage (1946).

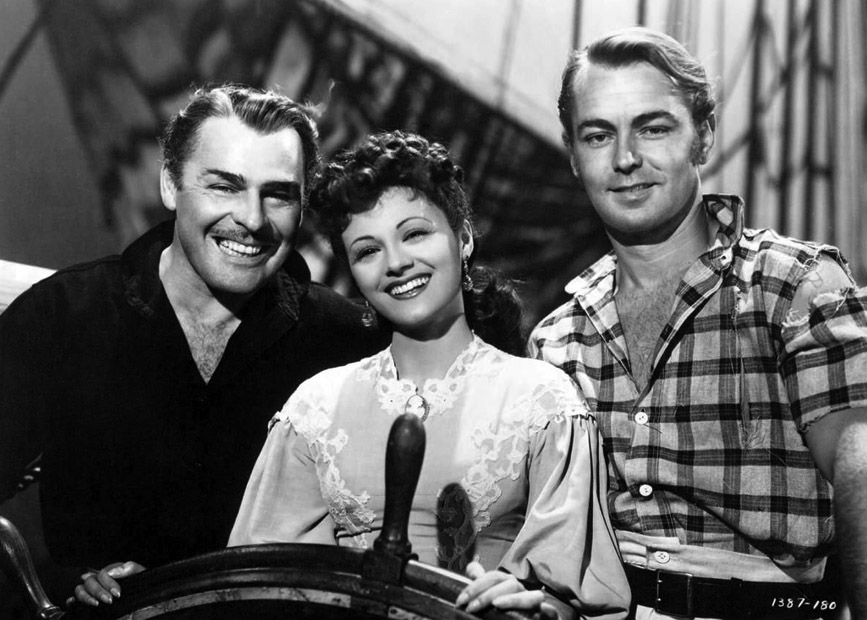
Donlevy with Esther Fernández and Alan Ladd in Two Years Before the Mast (1946)

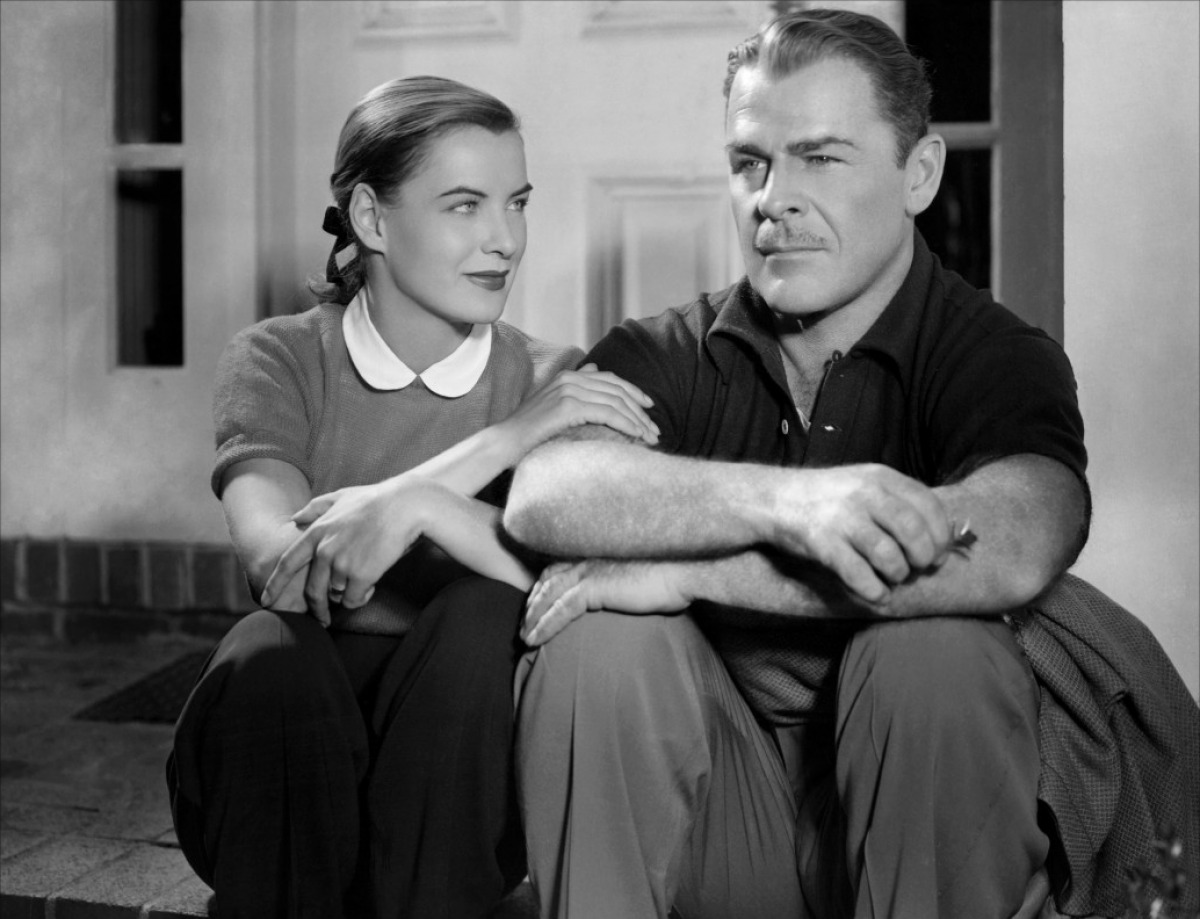
Donlevy with Ella Raines in Impact (1949)

At Paramount, he was in Two Years Before the Mast (1946), although top billing went to Alan Ladd. Donlevy was originally going to play the sadistic captain, but wound up giving that role to Howard da Silva and playing Richard Dana instead. At Paramount, Donlevy supported Ray Milland in The Trouble with Women (1947), then went to Fox to play a heroic DA in Kiss of Death (1947) with Victor Mature and Richard Widmark. For UA, he supported Robert Cummings in Heaven Only Knows (1947), then went to MGM for the Killer McCoy (1947), a hit with Mickey Rooney; A Southern Yankee (1948) with Red Skelton; and Command Decision (1948) with Clark Gable. He supported Dorothy Lamour in The Lucky Stiff (1949) then starred in Arthur Lubin's Impact (1949).

After a supporting role in The Big Combo (1955), Donlevy appeared in the British science-fiction horror film The Quatermass Xperiment (called The Creeping Unknown in the US) for Hammer Films, in the lead role of Professor Bernard Quatermass. The film was based on a 1953 BBC Television serial of the same name. The character had been British, but Hammer cast Donlevy in an attempt to help sell the film to North American audiences. Quatermass creator Nigel Kneale disliked Donlevy's portrayal, referring to him as "a former Hollywood heavy gone to seed". Nonetheless, the film was a success, and Donlevy returned for the sequel, Quatermass 2 (Enemy From Space in the US), in 1957, also based on a BBC television serial. It made him the only man to play the famous scientist on screen twice (although Scottish actor Andrew Keir later played him both on film and radio).

In between the films, Donlevy was in A Cry in the Night (1956). He had the lead in a "B" western, Escape from Red Rock (1957) and a supporting part in Cowboy (1958). He announced that he had formed his own production company for whom he would make a western, The Golden Spur, but it appears to have not been made. He guest-starred on TV in Rawhide, Wagon Train, Hotel de Paree, The Texan, The DuPont Show with June Allyson, Zane Grey Theater, and The Red Skelton Hour, had supporting roles in Juke Box Rhythm and Never So Few (both 1959), and had the lead in Girl in Room 13 (1960). He toured on stage in a production of The Andersonville Trial. He supported Jerry Lewis in The Errand Boy (1961) and Charlton Heston in The Pigeon That Took Rome (1962), and guested on Target: The Corruptors, Saints and Sinners, and The DuPont Show of the Week.

=== Television ===
He appeared on television in The Chevrolet Tele-Theatre, and made two films for Universal-International, Shakedown (1950) and Kansas Raiders (1950) (playing William Quantrill opposite Audie Murphy's Jesse James). He did Pulitzer Prize Playhouse on TV, then went to Republic for Fighting Coast Guard (1951), Ride the Man Down (1952), Hoodlum Empire (1952) and Woman They Almost Lynched (1953); then filmed Slaughter Trail (1952) for RKO.

In 1952 he produced and starred in a TV series, Dangerous Assignment, which he had performed on radio from 1949 to 1954.

Other television appearances included Robert Montgomery Presents, The Motorola Television Hour, Medallion Theatre, Star Stage, Climax!, Damon Runyon Theater, Kraft Theatre, Studio One in Hollywood, Crossroads, The Ford Television Theatre, The DuPont Show of the Month and Lux Video Theatre.

=== Later career ===
Donlevy had the lead in Curse of the Fly (1965) for Robert L. Lippert, and supported in How to Stuff a Wild Bikini (1965). In 1966, in one of the final episodes of Perry Mason, "The Case of the Positive Negative", he played defendant General Roger Brandon.

Donlevy's last performances included The Fat Spy (1966), an episode of Family Affair, new American footage shot in New York for Gamera the Invincible (1966), Five Golden Dragons (1967) for Harry Alan Towers, and the A.C. Lyles films Waco (1966), Hostile Guns (1967), Arizona Bushwhackers (1968), and Rogue's Gallery (1968).

His last film was Pit Stop, a racing drama by exploitation filmmaker Jack Hill, released in 1969.

== Personal life ==
Donlevy was married to Yvonne Grey from 1928 to 1936. She divorced him on grounds of cruelty. He married actress Marjorie Lane in 1936. They had one child, but divorced in 1947. He was married to Lillian Arch Lugosi (1911-1981) (the former wife of Bela Lugosi) from 1966 until his death in 1972.

Donlevy supported Thomas Dewey in the 1944 United States presidential election.

=== Death ===
Donlevy was operated on for throat cancer in 1971 and died from the disease on April 6, 1972, at the Motion Picture Country Hospital in Woodland Hills, Los Angeles, California. He was 71. His ashes were scattered over Santa Monica Bay.

== Appraisal ==
According to his obituary in The Times, "Any consideration of the American 'film noir' of the 1940s would be incomplete without him".

== Partial filmography ==
=== Film ===
- Damaged Hearts (1924) as Jim Porter
- Monsieur Beaucaire (1924) as Ball Guest at Bath (uncredited)
- School for Wives (1925) as Ralph
- A Man of Quality (1926) as Richard Courtney
- Gentlemen of the Press (1929) as Kelly – Reporter (uncredited)
- Mother's Boy (1929) as Harry O'Day
- A Modern Cinderella (1932, short)
- Barbary Coast (1935) as Knuckles Jacoby
- Mary Burns, Fugitive (1935) as Spike
- Another Face (1935) as Broken Nose Dawson / Spencer Dutro III
- Strike Me Pink (1936) as Vance
- 13 Hours by Air (1936) as Dr. James L. Evarts
- Human Cargo (1936) as Packy Campbell
- Half Angel (1936) as Duffy Giles
- High Tension (1936) as Steve Reardon
- 36 Hours to Kill (1936) as Frank Evers
- Crack-Up (1936) as Ace Martin
- Midnight Taxi (1937) as Charles 'Chick' Gardner
- This Is My Affair (1937) as Batiste Duryea
- Born Reckless (1937) as Bob 'Hurry' Kane
- In Old Chicago (1937) as Gil Warren
- Battle of Broadway (1938) as Chesty Webb
- We're Going to Be Rich (1938) as Yankee Gordon
- Sharpshooters (1938) as Steve Mitchell
- Jesse James (1939) as Barshee
- Union Pacific (1939) as Sid Campeau
- Beau Geste (1939) as Sergeant Markoff
- Behind Prison Gates (1939) as Agent Norman Craig / Red Murray
- Allegheny Uprising (1939) as Callendar
- Destry Rides Again (1939) as Kent
- The Great McGinty (1940) as Dan McGinty
- When the Daltons Rode (1940) as Grat Dalton
- Brigham Young (1940) as Angus Duncan
- I Wanted Wings (1941) as Capt. Mercer
- Billy the Kid (1941) as Jim Sherwood
- Hold Back the Dawn (1941) as Movie Actor (uncredited)
- South of Tahiti (1941) as Bob
- Birth of the Blues (1941) as Memphis
- The Remarkable Andrew (1942) as General Andrew Jackson
- Two Yanks in Trinidad (1942) as Vince Barrows
- A Gentleman After Dark (1942) as Harry 'Heliotrope Harry' Melton
- The Great Man's Lady (1942) as Steely Edwards
- Wake Island (1942) as Maj. Geoffrey Caton
- The Glass Key (1942) as Paul Madvig
- Nightmare (1942) as Daniel Shane
- Stand By for Action (1942) as Lt. Cmdr. Martin J. Roberts
- Hangmen Also Die! (1943) as Dr. Franticek Svoboda / Karel Vanek
- The Miracle of Morgan's Creek (1943) as Governor McGinty
- An American Romance (1944) as Stefan Dubechek aka Steve Dangos
- Duffy's Tavern (1945) as Brian Donlevy
- The Virginian (1946) as Trampas
- Our Hearts Were Growing Up (1946) as Tony Minnetti
- Canyon Passage (1946) as George Camrose
- Two Years Before the Mast (1946) as Richard Henry Dana
- The Beginning or the End (1947) as Major General Leslie R. Groves
- Song of Scheherazade (1947) as Capt. Vladimir Gregorovitch
- The Trouble with Women (1947) as Joe McBride
- Kiss of Death (1947) as Assistant D.A. Louis D'Angelo
- Heaven Only Knows (1947) as Adam 'Duke' Byron
- Killer McCoy (1947) as Jim Caighn
- A Southern Yankee (1948) as Kurt Devlynn
- Command Decision (1948) as Brigadier General Clifton I. Garnet
- The Lucky Stiff (1949) as John J. Malone
- Impact (1949) as Walter Williams
- Shakedown (1950) as Nick Palmer
- Kansas Raiders (1950) as Col. William Clarke Quantrill
- Fighting Coast Guard (1951) as Commander Ian McFarland
- Slaughter Trail (1951) as Capt. Dempster
- Hoodlum Empire (1952) as Senator Bill Stephens
- Ride the Man Down (1952) as Bide Marriner
- Woman They Almost Lynched (1953) as Charles Quantrill
- The Big Combo (1955) as Joe McClure
- The Quatermass Xperiment (1955) as Prof. Bernard Quatermass
- A Cry in the Night (1956) as Capt. Ed Bates
- Quatermass 2 (1957) as Prof. Bernard Quatermass
- Escape from Red Rock (1957) as Bronc Grierson
- Cowboy (1958) as Doc Bender
- Juke Box Rhythm (1959) as George Manton
- Never So Few (1959) as Gen. Sloan
- Girl in Room 13 (1960) as Steve Marshall
- The Errand Boy (1961) as Tom 'T.P.' Paramutual
- The Pigeon That Took Rome (1962) as Col. Sherman Harrington
- Curse of the Fly (1965) as Henri Delambre
- How to Stuff a Wild Bikini (1965) as B.D. 'Big Deal' MacPherson
- The Fat Spy (1966) as George Wellington
- Waco (1966) as Ace Ross
- Gammera: The Invincible (1966) as Gen. Terry Arnold
- Five Golden Dragons (1967) as Dragon #3
- Hostile Guns (1967) as Marshal Willett
- Arizona Bushwhackers (1968) as Mayor Joe Smith
- Rogue's Gallery (1968) as Detective Lee
- Pit Stop (1969) as Grant Willard

=== Television ===
Year	Title	Role	Notes
1949	The Chevrolet Tele-Theatre		Episode: "Weather Ahead"
1949–54	Dangerous Assignment	Steve Mitchell	Main role
1950	Pulitzer Prize Playhouse	LCDR. Miller	Episode: "The Pharmacist's Mate"
1953	Robert Montgomery Presents		Episode: "The First Vice President"
1953	The Motorola Television Hour		Episode: "At Ease"
1953–56	Lux Video Theatre	Various roles	3 episodes
1954	Medallion Theatre		Episode: "Safari"
1955	Star Stage	Honest John Gaminski	Episode: "Honest John and the 13 Uncle Sams"
1955	Climax!	Sam Marvin, LCDR. Knowles	2 episodes
1955	Damon Runyon Theater		Episode: "Barbeque"
1955–56	Ford Theatre	Joe Aladdin, Charlie Brock	2 episodes
1955–57	Crossroads	Various roles	3 episodes
1956	Kraft Television Theatre	Paddo	Episode: "Home is the Hero"
1956	Studio One	Jim	Episode: "The Laughter of Giants"
1957	DuPont Show of the Month	Constable Dale	Episode: "Beyond This Place"
1959	Rawhide	Jed Reston	Episode: "Incident of the Power and the Plow"
1959	Wagon Train	Jasper Cato	Episode: "The Jasper Cato Story"
1959	Hotel de Paree	Cpt. Sean McElroy	Episode: "Juggernaut"
1959	The Texan	Sheriff Bob Gleason, Sam Gallup	2 episodes
1960	The DuPont Show with June Allyson	John Ridges	Episode: "Escape"
1960	Dick Powell's Zane Grey Theatre	Fred Childress	Episode: "The Sunday Man"
1960	The Red Skelton Show	Big Dan	Episode: "Deadeye the Blacksmith"
1962	Target: The Corruptors!	Pete	Episode: "A Man Is Waiting to Be Murdered"
1962	Saints and Sinners	Preller	Episode: "Dear George, the Siamese Cat Is Missing"
1964	The DuPont Show of the Week	Cheese Karapolis	Episode: "Jeremy Rabbitt - The Secret Avenger"
1966	Family Affair	Owen Pennington	Episode: "Hart Hat Jody"
1966	Perry Mason	Gen. Roger Brandon	Episode: "The Case of the Positive Negative"

== Stage appearances ==
Year	Title	Role	Venue	Ref.
1924–25	What Price Glory	Cpl. Gowdy	Plymouth Theatre, New York	
1927–28	Hit the Deck	Donkey	Belasco Theatre, New York	
1928	Ringside	Huffy	Broadhurst Theatre, New York	
1928	Rainbow	Cpt. Robert Singleton	Gallo Opera House, New York	
1929	Queen Bee	John Talbot	Belmont Theatre, New York	
1930–31	Up Pops the Devil	George Kent	Theatre Masque, New York	
1931	Peter Flies High	Bill Curdy	Gaiety Theatre, New York	
1931–32	Society Girl	Briscoe	Booth Theatre, New York	
1932	The Inside Story	Nick Lipman	National Theatre, New York	
1932	The Boy Friend	The Eel	Morosco Theatre, New York	
1933	Three-Cornered Moon	Dr. Alan Stevens	Cort Theatre, New York	
1933	Three and One	Charles Valois	Longacre Theatre, New York	
1934	No Questions Asked	Ernie Dulany	Theatre Masque, New York	
1934	The Perfumed Lady	Warren Pascale	Ambassador Theatre, New York	
1934	The Milky Way	Speed McFarland	Cort Theatre, New York	
1934–35	Life Begins at 8:40	Various roles	Winter Garden Theatre, New York	

== Radio appearances ==
Year	Title	Episode	Ref.
1942	Philip Morris Playhouse	The Great McGinty	
1943	Burns and Allen	"Brian Donlevy Guest Star"	
1944	Suspense	"Black Path of Feer"	
1946	Suspense	"Out of Control"	
1946	Suspense	"Lazarus Walks"	
1949–53	Dangerous Assignment		

== Awards and nominations ==
Ceremony	Category	Work	Result	Ref.
12th Academy Awards	Best Supporting Actor	Beau Geste	Nominated	
8th New York Film Critics Circle Awards	Best Actor	Wake Island	Nominated (Note: Tied with Ronald Colman for Random Harvest and Monty Woolley for The Man Who Came to Dinner.)	

For his contributions to television, Donlevy has a star on the Hollywood Walk of Fame, at 1551 Vine Street.
