= Human Cargo (film) =

1936 film by Allan Dwan

- Directed by: Allan Dwan
- Screenplay by: Doris Malloy; Jefferson Parker
- Starring: Claire Trevor; Brian Donlevy; Alan Dinehart
- Cinematography: Daniel B. Clark
- Edited by: Louis R. Loeffler
- Distributed by: 20th Century Fox
- Release date: June 16, 1936
- Running time: 66 minutes
- Country: USA
- Language: English

Human Cargo is a 1936 American action film, directed by Allan Dwan and released by 20th Century Fox. It stars Claire Trevor, Brian Donlevy, Alan Dinehart, and Rita Hayworth (credited as Rita Cansino). Rival reporters team up to catch alien smugglers.

== Cast ==
- Claire Trevor as Bonnie Brewster
- Brian Donlevy as Packy Campbell
- Alan Dinehart as Lionel Crocker
- Ralph Morgan as District Attorney Carey
- Helen Troy as Susie
- Rita Hayworth as Carmen Zoro
- Morgan Wallace as Gilbert Fender
- Herman Bing as Fritz Schultz
- John McGuire as 'Spike' Davis
- Ralf Harolde as Tony Sculla
- Wade Boteler as Bob McSweeney
- Harry Woods as Ira Conklin
- Wilfred Lucas as Police Chief
