= The Trumpet Blows =

1934 film by Stephen Roberts

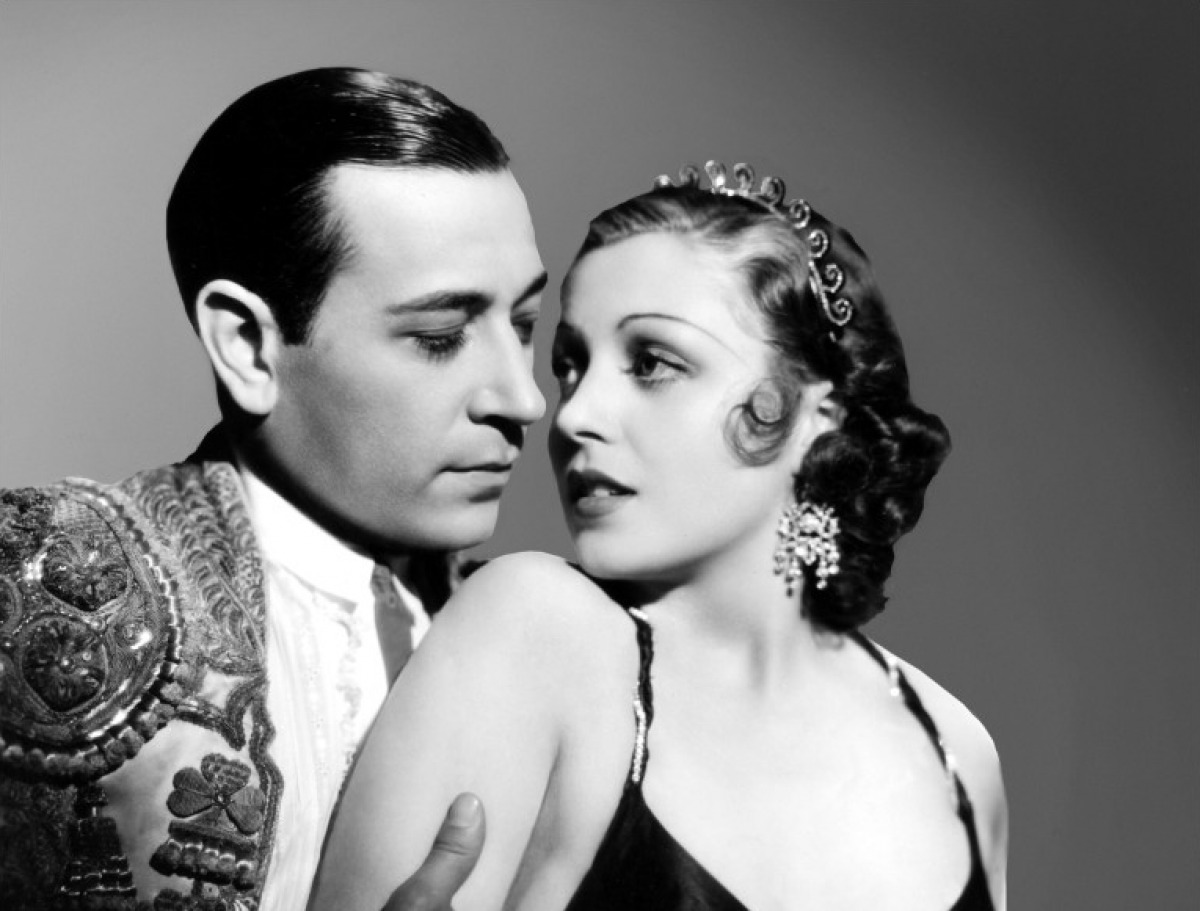
- Publicity still for film with George Raft and Frances Drake
- Directed by: Stephen Roberts
- Written by: Bartlett Cormack; Wallace Smith
- Starring: George Raft; Adolphe Menjou; Frances Drake
- Distributed by: Paramount Pictures
- Release date: April 14, 1934
- Running time: 72 minutes
- Country: United States
- Language: English

The Trumpet Blows is a 1934 American Pre-Code film directed by Stephen Roberts, featuring George Raft as a Mexican matador, Adolphe Menjou as a retired bandito clearly based on Pancho Villa, and Frances Drake as Chulita, the woman they both want to marry.

The film was written by Bartlett Cormack and Wallace Smith, and directed by Stephen Roberts.

The film was a box office disappointment.

== Cast ==
- George Raft as Manuel Montes
- Adolphe Menjou as Pancho Montes
- Frances Drake as Chulita
- Sidney Toler as Pepi Sancho
- Edward Ellis as Chato
- Katherine DeMille as Lupe, the Maid

== Production ==
Helen Twelvetrees was originally announced as female lead.
