= The Preview Murder Mystery =

1936 film by Robert Florey

- Directed by: Robert Florey
- Written by: Brian Marlow; Robert Yost; Garnett Weston; Harlan Ware
- Produced by: Harold Hurley
- Starring: Reginald Denny; Frances Drake; Gail Patrick
- Cinematography: Karl Struss
- Edited by: James Smith
- Production company: Paramount Pictures
- Distributed by: Paramount Pictures
- Release date: February 28, 1936
- Running time: 60 minutes
- Country: United States
- Language: English

The Preview Murder Mystery is a 1936 American comedy mystery film directed by Robert Florey and starring Reginald Denny, Frances Drake and Gail Patrick. It was produced and distributed by Paramount Pictures. The plot follows a studio public relations man who attempts to trap a killer using television technology, allowing on-screen glimpses of technicians like Florey's cinematographer Karl Struss.

== Plot ==
Johnny Morgan is the suave head of PR for a movie studio and a devoted fan of a mysterious actor who developed a cult following during the silent era. It is widely believed that it is a tragedy that the actor died before sound movies became the standard. Some see the idea of remaking his films as sound productions as bordering on sacrilege. From his description, this actor reflected elements of Rudolph Valentino and Lon Chaney, Sr.: he was an exotically handsome leading man and a master of disguise who appeared in many intense, weird roles.

When an attempt is made to remake one of his starring vehicles as a musical, the effort seems cursed, with many accidents happening inexplicably. In time it becomes apparent that a murderer is lurking in the studio, possibly in the fashion of The Phantom of the Opera, and police quarantine the studio. Executives decide that work should continue on films as the night wears on. Morgan and a technician hide in a sound editing room and eavesdrop on productions. There is an iris out effect whenever they tune in to a soundstage and the audience sees the films being shot.

== Cast ==
- Reginald Denny as Johnny Morgan
- Frances Drake as Peggy Madison
- Gail Patrick as Claire Woodward Smith
- George Barbier as Jerome Hewitt
- Ian Keith as E. Gordon Smith
- Rod La Rocque as Neil DuBeck/Joe Walker
- Conway Tearle as Edwin Strange
- Jack Raymond as George Tyson
- Colin Tapley as Studio Manager
- Jack Mulhall as Jack Rawlins
- Bryant Washburn as Carl Jennings
- Franklyn Farnum as James Daley
- Lee Shumway as Chief of Police
- Spencer Charters as Watchman Jones

== Bibliography ==
- John T. Soister, Henry Nicolella & Steve Joyce. American Silent Horror, Science Fiction and Fantasy Feature Films, 1913-1929. McFarland, 2014.
