= If I Had a Million =

1932 American anthology film

If I Had A Million
- Theatrical poster
- Directed by: Ernst Lubitsch; Norman Taurog; Stephen Roberts; Norman Z. McLeod; James Cruze; William A. Seiter; H. Bruce Humberstone; Lothar Mendes (uncredited)
- Written by: Robert Hardy Andrews (story); Multiple writers (Note: Credited writers were: Claude Binyon Whitney Bolton Malcolm Stuart Boylan John Bright Sidney Buchman Lester Cole Isabel Dawn Boyce DeGaw Oliver H.P. Garrett Harvey Gates Grover Jones Ernst Lubitsch Lawton Mackall Joseph L. Mankiewicz William Slavens McNutt and Robert Sparks)
- Based on: Windfall; 1931 novel by Robert Hardy Andrews
- Produced by: Emanuel Cohen
- Starring: Gary Cooper; Charles Laughton; George Raft; W. C. Fields; Richard Bennett
- Cinematography: Harry Fischbeck; Charles Edgar Schoenbaum; Gilbert Warrenton; Alvin Wyckoff (all uncredited)
- Edited by: LeRoy Stone
- Music by: John Leipold
- Distributed by: Paramount Pictures
- Release date: December 2, 1932
- Running time: 88 minutes
- Country: United States
- Language: English

If I Had a Million is a 1932 American pre-Code Paramount Studios anthology film starring Gary Cooper, George Raft, Charles Laughton, W. C. Fields, Jack Oakie, Frances Dee and Charlie Ruggles, among others. There were seven directors: Ernst Lubitsch, Norman Taurog, Stephen Roberts, Norman Z. McLeod, James Cruze, William A. Seiter, and H. Bruce Humberstone. Lubitsch, Cruze, Seiter, and Humberstone were each responsible for a single vignette, Roberts and McLeod directed two each, and Taurog was in charge of the prologue and epilogue. The screenplays were scripted by many different writers, with Joseph L. Mankiewicz making a large contribution. The film is based on the 1931 novel Windfall by Robert Hardy Andrews.

A wealthy dying businessman played by veteran actor Richard Bennett decides to leave his money to eight complete strangers. Gary Cooper, Charles Laughton, George Raft, May Robson, Charles Ruggles, and Gene Raymond play some of the lucky beneficiaries.

The 1950s television series The Millionaire was based on a similar concept.

== Plot ==
Dying industrial tycoon John Glidden cannot decide what to do with his wealth. He despises his money-hungry relatives and believes none of his employees is capable of running his various companies. Finally, he decides to give a million dollars ($23,464,598.54 in 2025) each to eight people picked at random from a telephone directory before he passes away, so as to avoid his will being contested. (The first name selected is John D. Rockefeller, which is swiftly rejected.)

=== China Shop ===
- Directed by Norman Z. McLeod

Henry Peabody is unhappy, both at work and at home. A bookkeeper promoted to salesman in a china shop, Henry keeps breaking the merchandise, meaning his "raise" results in his bringing home less money than before, something his nagging wife is quick to notice. After Glidden gives him a certified check, Henry shows up late for work and then proceeds to gleefully wreak destruction on the wares.

=== Violet ===
- Directed by Stephen Roberts

A prostitute named Violet Smith makes a reservation at an expensive hotel and sleeps alone.

=== The Forger ===
- Directed by H. Bruce Humberstone

Eddie Jackson narrowly avoids arrest for trying to cash a forged check. With his prior record, if he were caught, it would mean a life sentence in prison. When Glidden presents him with his check, Eddie is delighted ... at first. However, he does not dare show his face in a bank, and none of his criminal associates believes the check is genuine. Frantic to leave town and desperately needing to sleep, the penniless man gives the check as security for a ten-cent bed in a flophouse. The manager secretly calls the police to take away what he thinks is a lunatic, and uses the check to light his cigar.

=== Road Hogs ===
- Directed by Norman Z. McLeod

Ex-vaudeville performer Emily La Rue is very content with her life, running her tea room with the help of her partner, ex-juggler Rollo. Only one thing is lacking to make her satisfaction complete, and it is delivered that very day: a brand new car. However, when they take it out for a drive, it is wrecked when another driver ignores a stop signal. The heartbroken woman returns to her tea room, where Glidden finds her.

She comes up with an inventive way to spend part of her great windfall. She and Rollo purchase eight used cars and hire drivers. They all take to the road in a long procession. When they encounter an inconsiderate road hog, Emily and Rollo immediately set off in pursuit and crash into the offender's automobile. They then switch to one of their spare cars and repeat the process, until they run out of automobiles. At the end of the day, Emily purchases another new car, but it too is destroyed in a collision with a truck. No matter. Emily tells Rollo it has been "a glorious day".

This sequence was one of four written by Joe Mankiewicz, and contains a reference to his hometown Wilkes-Barre, Pennsylvania.

=== Death Cell ===
- Directed by James Cruze

Prisoner John Wallace has been condemned to the electric chair for killing someone during a robbery. After a tearful conversation with his wife Mary, he is visited in his cell by Glidden. John is certain that his new-found wealth will save him, but it is too late. He is executed that same day, despite his protests.

=== The Clerk ===
- Directed by Ernst Lubitsch

When clerk Phineas V. Lambert receives his check in the mail, he shows little emotion. He merely leaves his desk, calmly climbs the stairs to the office of first the secretary of the president of the company, then to the office of the private secretary, and finally knocks on the door of the president himself. When he is admitted, Phineas blows a raspberry at his former boss and leaves.

=== The Three Marines ===
- Directed by William A. Seiter

Glidden finds U.S. Marine Steve Gallagher and his good buddies Mulligan and O'Brien in the stockade for striking their sergeant. However, when Glidden gives Gallagher the check, Gallagher notices it is April Fools' Day and assumes it is a joke.

When the three men are released, they immediately head for a nearby lunch stand to see Marie, the pretty waitress. They all want to take her to the carnival, but none of them has any money. Then Gallagher remembers his check and that Zeb, the stand's owner, is illiterate. He tells Zeb that the check is for $10 and gets Zeb to cash it. He and Marie head off to the carnival, but Gallagher cannot shake his pals. Then Mulligan becomes embroiled in a fight, his comrades join in, and the trio end up right back in the stockade. Through the bars, they watch dumbfounded as a fancily dressed Zeb steps out of a limousine, escorting an equally well-garbed Marie.

=== Grandma ===
- Directed by Stephen Roberts

The last beneficiary is Mary Walker, one of many unhappy elderly women consigned to a rest home run by Mrs. Garvey. Mrs. Garvey is a petty tyrant who enforces her rules rigorously, to the displeasure of her charges, especially the spirited, defiant Mary. Mary uses her money to turn the tables. She pays Mrs. Garvey and the rest of the staff just to sit in rocking chairs while she and the other residents have a wonderful time partying and dancing with their gentleman friends.

Mary's spirit even reinvigorates John Glidden. Glidden ignores his doctor and looks forward to spending time with Mary.

== Cast ==
Main cast (in credits order)

- Gary Cooper as Steve Gallagher
- Charles Laughton as Phineas V. Lambert
- George Raft as Eddie Jackson
- Jack Oakie as Private Mulligan
- Richard Bennett as John Glidden
- Charles Ruggles as Henry Peabody
- Alison Skipworth as Emily La Rue
- W. C. Fields as Rollo La Rue
- Mary Boland as Mrs. Peabody
- Roscoe Karns as Private O'Brien
- May Robson as Mrs. Mary Walker

Supporting cast (uncredited)

- Hooper Atchley as hotel desk clerk
- Irving Bacon as china shop salesman
- Eddie Baker as second desk clerk
- Reginald Barlow as Otto K. Bullwinkle
- Harry C. Bradley as uniformed bank guard
- James Bush as Bowen, a teller at the second bank
- Berton Churchill as warden
- Wallis Clark as Mr. Monroe, bank executive
- Joyce Compton as Marie, a waitress
- Cecil Cunningham as Agnes, Emily's friend
- Frances Dee as Mary Wallace
- Lester Dorr as pedestrian at accident
- James Durkin as Glidden associate
- Effie Ellsler as Mrs. Scott, Idylwood resident
- Louise Emmons as Idylwood resident
- Bess Flowers as china shop customer
- Blanche Frederici as Mrs. Garvey
- Wynne Gibson as Violet Smith
- Frank Hagney as Mike, carnival bouncer
- Lillian Harmer as Idylwood receptionist
- Samuel S. Hinds as lawyer
- Robert Homans as detective
- Lew Kelly as prison barber
- Fred Kelsey as prison jailer
- Tom Kennedy as Joe, carnival bouncer
- Lydia Knott as Idylwood resident
- Ruby Lafayette as Idylwood resident
- Marc Lawrence as Mike's henchman
- Edward LeSaint as Mr. Brown
- Ida Lewis as Mrs. Davis, Idylwood resident
- Lucien Littlefield as Zeb, hamburger stand owner
- Margaret Mann as Idylwood resident
- Grant Mitchell as prison priest
- William V. Mong as Harry, Jackson's fence
- Clarence Muse as death row singing prisoner
- Gertrude Norman as Idylwood resident
- Gail Patrick as new secretary at Idylwood
- Jack Pennick as sailor with Violet
- Walter Percival as carnival concessionaire
- Tempe Pigott as Idylwood resident
- Russ Powell as bartender at Violet's hangout
- Gene Raymond as John Wallace
- Tom Ricketts as Mary's dancing partner at Idylwood
- Willard Robertson as Fred, Glidden associate
- Dewey Robinson as Papadapoulos, Idylwood cook
- Fred Santley as Marvin, Glidden assistant
- Syd Saylor as driver
- Margaret Seddon as Mrs. Small, Idylwood resident
- John St. Polis as Glidden associate
- Edwin Stanley as Mr. Galloway, bank manager
- Larry Steers as Glidden associate
- Frederic Richard Sullivan as Glidden associate
- Kent Taylor as bank teller
- Jerry Tucker as crying boy with balloon
- Morgan Wallace as Mike, Jackson's gangster friend
- Mai Wells as Idylwood resident
- Edith Yorke as Idylwood resident

== Reception ==
The New York Times review called it "an unusually good entertainment worked out with true imagination and originality, except possibly for one interlude (Death Cell)."
