= A Man of Quality =

1926 film

- Directed by: Wesley Ruggles
- Written by: H.H. Van Loan
- Produced by: Samuel Zierler
- Starring: George Walsh; Ruth Dwyer; Brian Donlevy
- Cinematography: Frank Zucker
- Production company: Excellent Pictures
- Distributed by: Excellent Pictures
- Release date: October 1, 1926
- Country: United States
- Languages: Silent; English intertitles

A Man of Quality is a 1926 American silent crime film directed by Wesley Ruggles and starring George Walsh, Ruth Dwyer and Brian Donlevy. The survival status of the film is unknown.

== Plot ==
Jack Banning, a member of the Secret Service, receives a mission to disrupt the operations of a gang involved in smuggling silk. Adopting the guise of a motorcycle officer, Banning monitors their activities during the day, and by night, he assumes the persona of "Strongarm Samson," a criminal. Along the way, he becomes enamored with Marion Macy, the daughter of a banker, who is also being pursued by Courtney, the leader of the smuggling ring. Marion eventually discovers Banning's true identity and informs Courtney of his law enforcement affiliation. Banning is apprehended by Spanish Joe, one of Courtney's associates, but manages to escape. Meanwhile, Marion is enticed to the gang's hideout, where Dorina, another undercover agent, awaits assistance from the authorities. After a fierce confrontation, Banning returns to rescue Marion from Courtney's grasp. Ultimately, the smugglers are apprehended, and Banning finds solace in Marion's company.

== Cast ==
- George Walsh as Jack Banning
- Ruth Dwyer as Marion Marcy
- Brian Donlevy as Richard Courtney
- Lucien Prival as Spanish Joe
- Laura De Cardi as Dorina

== Bibliography ==
- Munden, Kenneth White. The American Film Institute Catalog of Motion Pictures Produced in the United States, Part 1. University of California Press, 1997.
