= Frances Drake =

American actress (1912–2000)

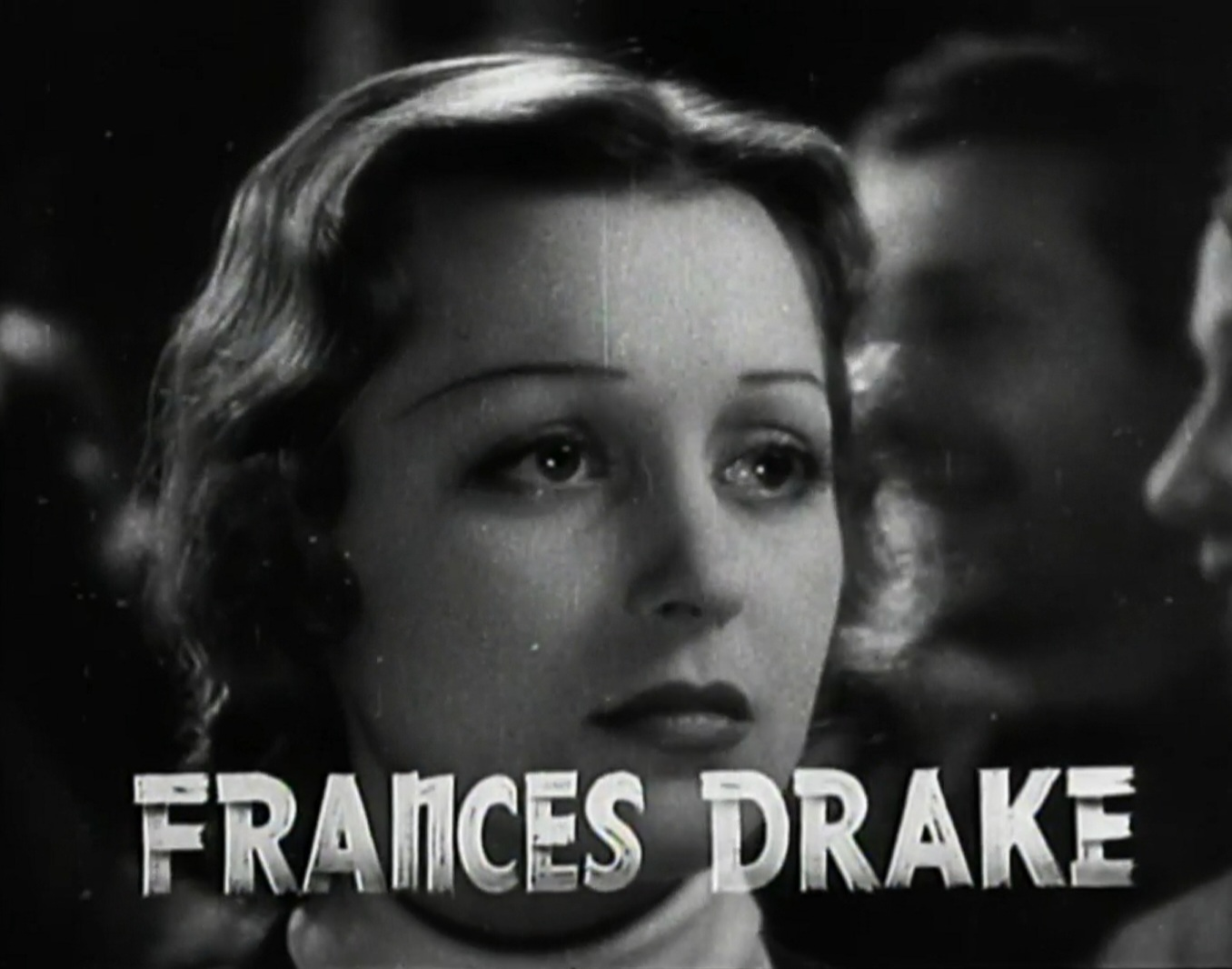
- Trailer for Mad Love (1935)
- Born: Frances Morgan Dean; October 22, 1912; New York City, U.S.
- Died: January 18, 2000 (aged 87); Irvine, California, U.S.
- Resting place: Hollywood Forever Cemetery
- Occupation: Actress
- Years active: 1933–1942
- Spouses: Lt. the Hon. Cecil John Arthur Howard (m. 1939; died 1985) David Brown (m. 1992)

Frances Drake (born Frances Morgan Dean; October 22, 1912 – January 18, 2000) was an American actress best known for playing Eponine in Les Misérables (1935).

== Early years ==
Drake was born in New York City as Frances Morgan Dean to a wealthy family. She was educated at Havergal College in Canada and at age 14 "she was sent to school in England, under her aunt Violet Dean." She was there when the stock market crashed in 1929.

== Career ==
Needing to make money for the first time in her life, Drake became a dancer and stage actress and found that film paid even better. In 1933, she explained: "I met an actor in London – Gordon Wallace, who was in Eva Le Gallienne's repertory company for a while – and he asked me to form a dance team with him. We danced, and a stage producer asked us to take parts in a play. Then I was invited to make films in England."

She returned to the United States in 1934 and was offered a contract by Paramount, which changed her name to Frances Drake (after the studio initially wanted her new name to be Marianne Morel to avoid confusion with the then-popular star Frances Dee). She was coached by opera singer and actress Marguerite Namara while continuing in film. She was often typecast in "damsel in distress" roles and appeared in proto-horror and proto-sci-fi films opposite stars like Bela Lugosi, Boris Karloff, and Peter Lorre. One film reference book summed up Drake's career as follows: "She played leads in many Hollywood productions of the '30s, often as the terrified heroine of horror and mystery tales."

== Personal life ==
On February 12, 1939, Drake married Hon. Cecil Howard (1908–1985), second son of Henry Howard, 19th Earl of Suffolk. Howard disapproved of her career, and she retired from the screen when he received his inheritance. After Howard's death, she married David Brown in 1992; he died in 2009.

== Recognition ==
She has a star in the Motion Picture section of the Hollywood Walk of Fame, located at 6821 Hollywood Boulevard.

She has a school named after her in Leominster, Massachusetts.

== Death ==
Drake died in Irvine, California, on January 18, 2000, aged 87. She is interred in Section 8 Garden of Legends in the Hollywood Forever Cemetery, Hollywood, California.

== Filmography ==
- The Jewel (1933) - Jenny Day/Lady Joan
- Meet My Sister (1933) - Helen Sowerby
- Bolero (1934) - Leona
- The Trumpet Blows (1934) - Chulita
- Ladies Should Listen (1934) - Anna Mirelle
- Forsaking All Others (1934) - Connie Barnes Todd
- Transient Lady (1935) - Dale Cameron
- Les Miserables (1935) - Eponine
- Mad Love (1935) - Yvonne Orlac
- Without Regret (1935) - Mona Gould
- The Invisible Ray (1936) - Diana Rukh
- The Preview Murder Mystery (1936) - Peggy Madison
- Florida Special (1936) - Marina Landon
- And Sudden Death (1936) - Betty Winslow
- I'd Give My Life (1936) - Mary Reyburn
- Midnight Taxi (1937) - Gilda Lee
- You Can't Have Everything (1937) - Pamela Beaumont
- She Married an Artist (1937) - Sally Dennis
- Love Under Fire (1937)
- There's Always a Woman (1938) - Anne Calhoun
- The Lone Wolf in Paris (1938) - Princess Thania of Arvonne
- It's a Wonderful World (1939) - Vivian Tarbel
- I Take This Woman (1940) - Lola Estermont
- The Affairs of Martha (1942) - Sylvia Norwood (final film role)
