= The Trouble with Women (film) =

1947 film by Sidney Lanfield

- Directed by: Sidney Lanfield
- Screenplay by: Ruth McKenney; Arthur Sheekman; Richard Bransten; Benjamin Sacks
- Produced by: Harry Tugend
- Starring: Ray Milland; Teresa Wright; Brian Donlevy
- Cinematography: Lionel Lindon
- Edited by: William Shea
- Music by: Robert E. Dolan
- Production company: Paramount Pictures
- Distributed by: Paramount Pictures
- Release date: June 25, 1947
- Running time: 80 minutes
- Country: United States
- Language: English

The Trouble with Women is a 1947 American comedy film directed by Sidney Lanfield and starring Ray Milland, Teresa Wright, Brian Donlevy. It was produced and distributed by Paramount Pictures. It was produced in 1945 but was held back from release for two years.

== Plot ==
A college professor writes a controversial book claiming that woman have a secret desire to be subjugated. A female journalist sets out to try and dig up information on him by enrolling in one of his classes. When her newspaper prints an article claiming that his theories suggest that women want to be "socked", he sues for $300,000. In order to get him to withdraw the action, the journalist tries to goad him into striking her when a photographer is secretly nearby, so he can be blackmailed. But the professor, who is engaged to a staid bluestocking, and the journalist, pursued romantically by her editor, begin to develop feelings towards each other.

== Cast ==
- Ray Milland as Professor Gilbert Sedley
- Teresa Wright as Kate Farrell
- Brian Donlevy as Joe McBride
- Rose Hobart as Agnes Meeler
- Charles Smith as Ulysses S. Jones
- Lewis Russell as Dr. Wilmer Dawson
- Iris Adrian as Rita La May
- Frank Faylen as Geeger
- Rhys Williams as Judge
- Lloyd Bridges as Avery Wilson
- Norma Varden as Mrs. Wilmer Dawson
- James Millican as Keefe
- Matt McHugh as Herman
- John Hamilton as 2nd Judge
- Charles Mayon as Reporter
- Minor Watson as Mr. Carver
- Kay Deslys as Bessie
- Mary Field as Della
- Kristine Miller as Coquette
- Eula Morgan as Mrs. Pooler

== Bibliography ==
- McKay, James. Ray Milland: The Films, 1929-1984. McFarland, 2020.
