= Love Under Fire =

1937 film by George Marshall

- Theatrical release poster
- Directed by: George Marshall
- Written by: Gene Fowler; Ernest Pascal; Allen Rivkin
- Based on: The Fugitives, a play by Walter Hackett
- Produced by: Nunnally Johnson
- Starring: Loretta Young; Don Ameche; Frances Drake
- Cinematography: Ernest Palmer
- Edited by: Barbara McLean
- Music by: Arthur Lange; Charles Maxwell
- Production company: Twentieth Century Fox
- Distributed by: Twentieth Century Fox
- Release date: August 20, 1937 (US)
- Running time: 75 minutes
- Country: United States
- Language: English

Love Under Fire is a 1937 American drama film based upon the play The Fugitives by Walter Hackett. It was directed by George Marshall and stars Loretta Young, Don Ameche and Frances Drake. The film's sets were designed by the art director Rudolph Sternad.

== Plot ==
During the Spanish Civil War, a detective from Scotland Yard falls in love with a woman he had believed to be a jewel thief.

== Cast ==
- Loretta Young as Myra Cooper
- Don Ameche as Tracy Egan
- Borrah Minevitch as himself
- Frances Drake as Pamela Beaumont
- Walter Catlett as Tip Conway
- John Carradine as Capt. Delmar
- Sig Ruman as General Montero
- Harold Huber as Lieutenant Chaves
- Katherine DeMille as Rosa
- E.E. Clive as Captain Bowden
- Don Alvarado as Lieutenant Cabana
- Georges Renavent as Captain Contreras
- Clyde Cook as Bert
- George Regas as Lieutenant De Vega
- Claude King as Cunningham
- John Bleifer as Juan
- Agostino Borgato as Cab Driver
- Egon Brecher as Civilian
