= The Remarkable Andrew =

1942 film by Stuart Heisler

- Directed by: Stuart Heisler
- Written by: Dalton Trumbo
- Based on: The Remarkable Andrew by Dalton Trumbo
- Produced by: Richard Blumenthal
- Starring: Brian Donlevy; William Holden; Ellen Drew; Montagu Love
- Cinematography: Theodor Sparkuhl
- Edited by: Archie Marshek
- Music by: Victor Young
- Production company: Paramount Pictures
- Distributed by: Paramount Pictures
- Release date: March 5, 1942
- Running time: 81 minutes
- Country: United States
- Language: English

The Remarkable Andrew is a 1942 film directed by Stuart Heisler and written by Dalton Trumbo based on his 1941 novel of the same name. It stars Brian Donlevy and William Holden.

== Plot ==
Young bookkeeper Andrew Long is an avid student of American history who reveres former president Andrew Jackson. When Long discovers discrepancies in the municipal financial records and that money is missing, the guilty parties attempt to discredit and imprison him. Long finds his savior when Jackson returns to Earth to help him with the help of several of the Founding Fathers.

== Cast ==
- Brian Donlevy as General Andrew Jackson
- William Holden as Andrew Long
- Ellen Drew as Peggy Tobin
- Montagu Love as General George Washington
- Gilbert Emery as Mr. Thomas Jefferson
- Brandon Hurst as Mr. Chief Justice John Marshall
- George Watts as Dr. Benjamin Franklin
- Rod Cameron as Jesse James
- Jimmy Conlin as Private Henry Bartholomew Smith
- Richard Webb as Randall Stevens
- Spencer Charters as Dr. Clarence Upjohn
- Minor Watson as District Attorney Orville Beamish
- Clyde Fillmore as Mayor Ollie Lancaster
- Thomas W. Ross as Judge Ormond Krebbs
- Porter Hall as Chief Clerk Art Slocumb
- Wallis Clark as City Treasurer R. R. McCall
- Milton Parsons as Purchase Agent Sam Savage
- Helena Phillips Evans as Mrs. Grondos
- Tom Fadden as Jake Pearl
- Harlan Briggs as Sheriff Clem Watkins
- Nydia Westman as Miss Van Buren
- Frances Gifford as Miss Halsey
- Martha O'Driscoll as District Attorney's Secretary
- Chester Conklin as Shopkeeper (uncredited)
