= Without Regret (film) =

1935 film by Harold Young

- Theatrical release poster
- Directed by: Harold Young
- Screenplay by: Roland Pertwee (play); Harold Dearden (play); Doris Anderson; Charles Brackett
- Produced by: B.P. Fineman
- Starring: Elissa Landi; Paul Cavanagh; Frances Drake; David Niven
- Cinematography: William C. Mellor
- Production company: Paramount Pictures
- Distributed by: Paramount Pictures
- Release date: September 13, 1935
- Running time: 74 minutes
- Country: United States
- Language: English

Without Regret is a 1935 American drama film directed by Harold Young and starring Elissa Landi, Paul Cavanagh and Frances Drake. It also features an early appearance by David Niven.

It was based on the play Interference the British writers Roland Pertwee and Harold Dearden which had previously been turned into a 1928 silent film of the same title. The film was released on September 13, 1935, by Paramount Pictures.

== Plot ==
After returning to England and unwittingly committing bigamy, a young woman is threatened with blackmail.

== Main cast ==
- Elissa Landi as Jennifer Gage
- Paul Cavanagh as Robert Godfrey
- Frances Drake as Mona Gould
- Kent Taylor as Steven Paradin
- Gilbert Emery as Inspector Hayes
- David Niven as Bill Gage
- Forrester Harvey as Police Surgeon
- Peter Hobbes as Fred
- Viva Tattersall as Vera

== Bibliography ==
- Monaco, James. The Encyclopedia of Film. Perigee Books, 1991.
- Munn, Michael. David Niven: The Man Behind the Balloon. Aurum Press, 2014.
