= Born Reckless (1937 film) =

1937 film by Malcolm St. Clair, Gustav Machatý

- Directed by: Malcolm St. Clair; Gustav Machatý
- Written by: Contributing writers: Alfred Golden; Lige Conley; Edwin Olmstead
- Screenplay by: John Patrick; Robert Ellis; Helen Logan
- Based on: "Born Reckless" by Jack Andrews
- Produced by: Milton Feld; Sol M. Wurtzel
- Starring: Rochelle Hudson; Brian Donlevy; Barton MacLane; Robert Kent; Harry Carey; Pauline Moore; Chick Chandler; William Pawley; Francis McDonald; George Walcott; Joseph Crehan
- Cinematography: Daniel B. Clark
- Edited by: Alex Troffey
- Music by: Samuel Kaylin
- Distributed by: 20th Century Fox
- Release date: June 25, 1937
- Running time: 59 minutes
- Language: English

Born Reckless is a 1937 American gangster film directed by Malcolm St. Clair and Gustav Machatý (St. Clair received sole directorial credit) and starring Brian Donlevy and Rochelle Hudson. Donlevy plays a race-car champion who infiltrates a mob-run taxi cab company. Barton MacLane plays the chief mobster.

== Plot ==
Bob Kane, a former auto racer, becomes a cab driver for a company that is being strong-armed by Jim Barnes and his gangsters trying to gain control of all of the city's taxi companies. Having gone through all of his winnings from his auto racing career, Kane hitches a train to the East Coast and joins a cab company owned by a former auto racing acquaintance after demonstrating he still has the skills necessary to handle a vehicle.

Soon afterwards, Kane ruffles the feathers of Barnes racketeering outfit by banging up the cabs of his stooges. He is offered a job by Barnes for almost ten times the money to get him off their backs, and is introduced to an armored cab Barnes intends to use to terrorize the few remaining holdout cab companies into his protection scheme. Kane declines the offer, but not before using Barnes' own war wagon to smash up his garage. Barnes' girlfriend Sybil tries to persuade Kane to reconsider the offer, but is upstaged when an inept Barnes driver using the armored car to harass a fellow driver known to Kane botches the job and the other driver ends up dying in the hit-and-run gone wrong.

Kane resolves to put Barnes behind bars for the crime, but gets stymied when Barnes hides the armored car. Barnes his girlfriend try to convince Kane to leave town with a payoff to prevent more violence. Instead, with a little perjury to get the District Attorney off Barnes' back, Kane takes him up on his offer to drive for him in order to bring the armored cab back into the open. Some machinations ensue and Kane nearly traps Barnes with a sting operation involving law enforcement, but Barnes escapes at the last minute.

In retribution, Barnes plots to destroy the rival cab garage that holds the owners staff and law enforcement officers by running a gasoline tanker truck down a hill and straight into the business. Barnes also finally discovers Sybil and Kane are actually operating in cahoots against him and in an eventual reversal of fortune ends up being held at gunpoint by Sybil while police close in and Kane acquires the armored cab and runs down the tanker truck in the nick of time. Barnes ends up being shot and killed by the responding officers, and Kane goes to the hospital to recover from his injuries received in his rescue crash. Kane ends up with Sybil.

== Cast ==
- Rochelle Hudson as Sybil Roberts
- Brian Donlevy as Bob 'Hurry' Kane
- Barton MacLane as Jim Barnes
- Robert Kent as Lee Martin
- Harry Carey as Dad Martin
- Pauline Moore as Dorothy Collins
- Chick Chandler as Windy Bowman
- William Pawley as Mac
- Francis McDonald as Louie
- George Walcott as Danny Horton (as George Wolcott)
- Joseph Crehan as District Attorney

== Production ==
Filming occurred at the Fox studio and at Union Station in downtown Los Angeles. During filming, Donlevy injured his hand, necessitating that two fingers be bandaged. The bandaged hand had to be concealed throughout filming, though it is visible at the end of the film. Former stars of the silent era Jack Mulhall, Joyce Compton and Mary MacLaren have uncredited bit parts. Union Station did not open until 1939.
