= The Ex-Mrs. Bradford =

1936 film by Stephen Roberts

- Theatrical release poster
- Directed by: Stephen Roberts
- Screenplay by: Anthony Veiller
- Story by: James Edward Grant
- Produced by: Edward Kaufman (associate producer)
- Starring: William Powell; Jean Arthur; James Gleason
- Cinematography: J. Roy Hunt
- Edited by: Arthur Roberts
- Music by: Roy Webb (musical director)
- Production company: RKO Radio Pictures
- Distributed by: RKO Radio Pictures
- Release date: May 15, 1936
- Running time: 82 minutes
- Country: United States
- Language: English
- Budget: $369,000
- Box office: $1,084,000

The Ex-Mrs. Bradford is a 1936 American comedy mystery film. William Powell and Jean Arthur star as a divorced couple who investigate a murder at a racetrack. This was the last film directed by Stephen Roberts before his death from a heart attack.

The similarity between RKO's The Ex-Mrs. Bradford and MGM's The Thin Man (1934) was speculated about given the chances that RKO's film would eclipse at the box office After the Thin Man (1936), which was to be released later in the year. Modern sources claim that the film was RKO's third-most-successful production of 1936.

== Plot ==
Wealthy murder mystery writer Paula Bradford (Jean Arthur) returns from her worldwide travels to see her former husband, surgeon Dr. Lawrence "Brad" Bradford (William Powell). He had divorced her because she was always involving him in real-life murder cases, but she wants him back. When a jockey riding the favorite dies while leading a race, she is convinced it was murder. Mike North (Frank M. Thomas), the horse's trainer, and she persuade the reluctant doctor to investigate. Brad is puzzled when he finds traces of gelatin on the corpse.

Then, he receives an envelope at home addressed to North, who telephones a little later to say he sent it and will come pick it up. Someone claiming to be North calls shortly afterward and instructs Brad to meet him somewhere else, but without the money. Curious, Brad opens the envelope to find a great deal of money and replaces it with some torn-up magazine pieces. Suspicious, Brad takes a taxi, but gets out a short distance away and returns to his suite. As he anticipated, a burglar is inside looking for the envelope. When the two men start fighting, Paula tries to help using a skull she picks up, but ends up knocking out Brad, instead, allowing the intruder to get away.

Soon after, the doorbell rings. When Brad opens the door, North's body falls in. Police Inspector Corrigan (James Gleason) names Brad as the main suspect in the second death. Now, Brad has to solve both murders to clear himself.

All sorts of suspects present themselves: Nick Martel (Robert Armstrong), a bookie who owed North $125,000 for a winning bet; Leroy Hutchins (Ralph Morgan), the owner of the winning horse; John Summers (Grant Mitchell), the favorite's owner; Mrs. Summers, who is seeing Martel behind her husband's back; and Summer's lawyer, Henry Strand (an uncredited Frank Reicher).

Even Brad's receptionist, Miss Prentiss (Lila Lee), had been spotted with Martel. Brad discovers that North made the bet through someone else and Martel was instructed to send the money to an address he was given, but decided to confront North in person, instead, over what he considered to be deceit; though North claimed he did not place the bet, Martel did not believe him and gave him the money.

Going to the address provided, Brad finds Paula already there. They then discover the body of Lou Pender (Paul Fix), the would-be burglar who had masqueraded as North, in a Murphy bed after he kills a spider. As Brad is examining the corpse, an unseen person shoots at him from the window. He is not seriously wounded.

Brad eventually figures out how the murders were committed. The killer put a deadly black widow spider inside a gelatin capsule, secretly attached it to the victim's body, and waited for the gelatin to melt from body heat, releasing the spider.

Since the police have the $125,000, Brad assumes the killer will try the same trick again. The same two horses are scheduled to race against each other the next day, so Brad has film cameras set up around the racetrack. The murderer does strike again, but Brad had taken the precaution of inoculating the jockey beforehand.

Brad invites all of the suspects to his suite, hoping the culprit will stay away. When that fails, he screens the film footage he had taken. It shows Mr. Summers slipping a capsule down the jockey's back. Pulling out a gun, Summers admits his motive was revenge against his unfaithful wife and Martel.

Brad subdues him before he can shoot the lovers. During the struggle, however, Paula accidentally knocks out her ex-husband with a vase. Despite this, the couple remarry.

== Cast ==
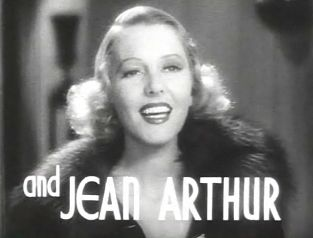

- William Powell as Dr. Lawrence Bradford
- Jean Arthur as Paula Bradford
- James Gleason as Inspector Corrigan
- Eric Blore as Stokes, Bradford's butler
- Robert Armstrong as Nick Martel
- Lila Lee as Miss Prentiss
- Grant Mitchell as John Summers
- Erin O'Brien-Moore as Mrs. Summers
- Ralph Morgan as Leroy Hutchins
- Lucile Gleason as Mrs. Hutchins

Uncredited (in order of appearance)

Frank M. Thomas	Mike North
Paul Fix	Lou Pender
Johnny Arthur	Mr. Frankensteen, process server
Al St. John	Attendant at morgue
Spencer Charters	Dr. Bunting, coroner
James Donlan	Taxi driver called by Bradford
John Dilson	Analyst examining gelatin capsule
Dorothy Granger	Receptionist filling in for Miss Prentiss
Stanley Blystone	Police radio operator

Bruce Mitchell	Police sergeant
John Sheehan	Private detective Bert "Murph" Murphy
Charles Richman	Mr. Curtis - Turf Club President
Rollo Lloyd	Mike North's landlord at 717 Cosicosco Street
Frank Reicher	Henry Strand, Summers' lawyer
Willie Best	Stablehand
Frankie Darro	Spike Salisbury, jockey
Syd Saylor	Detective
Edward McWade	Minister in film

== Reception ==
The film was very popular, and it earned a profit of $350,000.

== See also ==
- List of films about horses
- List of films about horse racing
