= Ride the Man Down =

1952 film by Joseph Kane

- Theatrical release poster
- Directed by: Joseph Kane
- Screenplay by: Mary C. McCall, Jr.
- Produced by: Joseph Kane
- Starring: Brian Donlevy; Rod Cameron; Ella Raines; Forrest Tucker; Barbara Britton; Chill Wills; J. Carrol Naish
- Cinematography: Jack A. Marta
- Edited by: Fred Allen
- Music by: Ned Freeman
- Production company: Republic Pictures
- Distributed by: Republic Pictures
- Release date: November 25, 1952
- Running time: 90 minutes
- Country: United States
- Language: English

Ride the Man Down is a 1952 American Western film directed by Joseph Kane, written by Mary C. McCall, Jr., and starring Brian Donlevy, Rod Cameron, Ella Raines, Forrest Tucker, Barbara Britton, Chill Wills and J. Carrol Naish. The film was released on November 25, 1952, by Republic Pictures.

== Plot ==
Celia Evarts (Ella Raines) and her uncle John Evarts (James Bell), inherit the valuable Hatchet Ranch after Celia's father dies in a winter snow blizzard. Other cattlemen and cowboys in the region immediately try to take advantage, grazing on their land and using its water for free. Celia's uncle John is also later shot and killed.

Will Ballard (Rod Cameron), her ranch foreman, sets out to protect Celia's interests, with Sheriff Joe Kneen's (J. Carrol Naish) help, particularly after Celia's fiance, Sam Danfelser (Forrest Tucker), betrays her and sides with Bide Marriner (Brian Donlevy), a rich neighboring rancher who hopes to gain control of Hatchet for himself. Bide Marriner seizes a watering hole for the cattle and the only way Will Ballard can think of to defeat him is to destroy it. Bide then tries to shoot the sheriff in the back, but Sheriff Kneen gets the better of him. Sam Danfelser rides in for one more confrontation, but before he and Will can come face to face, Celia slips away and takes care of matters herself.

== Cast ==
- Brian Donlevy as Bide Marriner
- Rod Cameron as Will Ballard
- Ella Raines as Celia Evarts
- Forrest Tucker as Sam Danfelser
- Barbara Britton as Lottie Priest
- Chill Wills as Ike Adams
- J. Carrol Naish as Sheriff Joe Kneen
- Jim Davis as Red Courteen
- Taylor Holmes as Lowell Priest
- James Bell as John Evarts (Celia's uncle)
- Paul Fix as Ray Cavanaugh
- Al Caudebec as Mel Young
- Roydon Clark as Jim Young
- Roy Barcroft as Russ Schultz
- Douglas Kennedy as Harve Garrison
- Chris-Pin Martin as Chris
- Jack La Rue as Kennedy
- Claire Carleton as Amelia

== Production ==
Parts of the film were shot in Kanab Canyon, Johnson Canyon (Juab County, Utah), and Cave Lakes in Utah.
