= Ladies Should Listen =

1934 film by Frank Tuttle

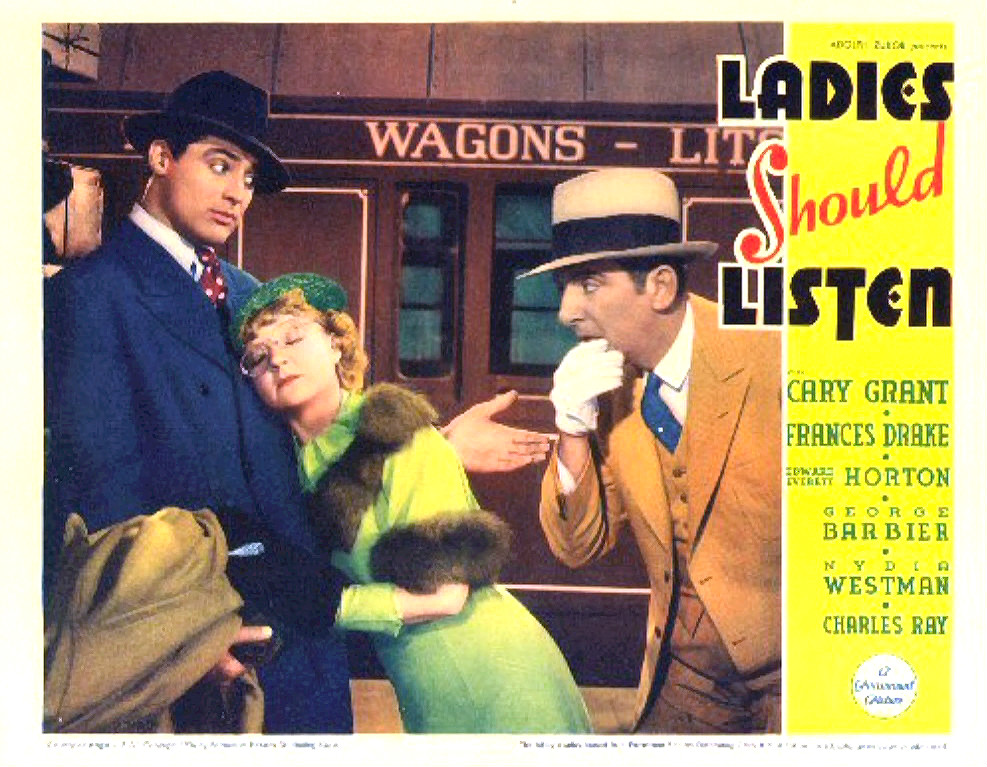
- Lobby card with Cary Grant, Nydia Westman and Edward Everett Horton
- Directed by: Frank Tuttle
- Written by: Claude Binyon; Guy Bolton; Alfred Savoir (play)
- Starring: Cary Grant; Frances Drake; Edward Everett Horton
- Distributed by: Paramount Pictures
- Release date: August 10, 1934
- Running time: 62 minutes
- Country: United States
- Language: English

Ladies Should Listen is a 1934 American comedy film directed by Frank Tuttle and starring Cary Grant, Edward Everett Horton, Frances Drake, and Nydia Westman.

== Plot ==
Switchboard operator Anna Mirelle falls in love with businessman Julian De Lussac, whom she has come to know only over the phone. When she discovers that De Lussac's current girlfriend Marguerite is part of a scheme to swindle him out of an option on a nitrate mine concession in Chile that he had bought, she devises a plot to save him and expose the con artist, Marguerite's husband Ramon Cintos.

De Lussac's friend Paul Vernet, who is in love with Susie Flamberg, is in a jealous rage because Susie has fallen in love with De Lussac. Susie has recruited her millionaire father to force De Lussac to marry her. De Lussac leaves Marguerite to be with Anna.

== Cast ==
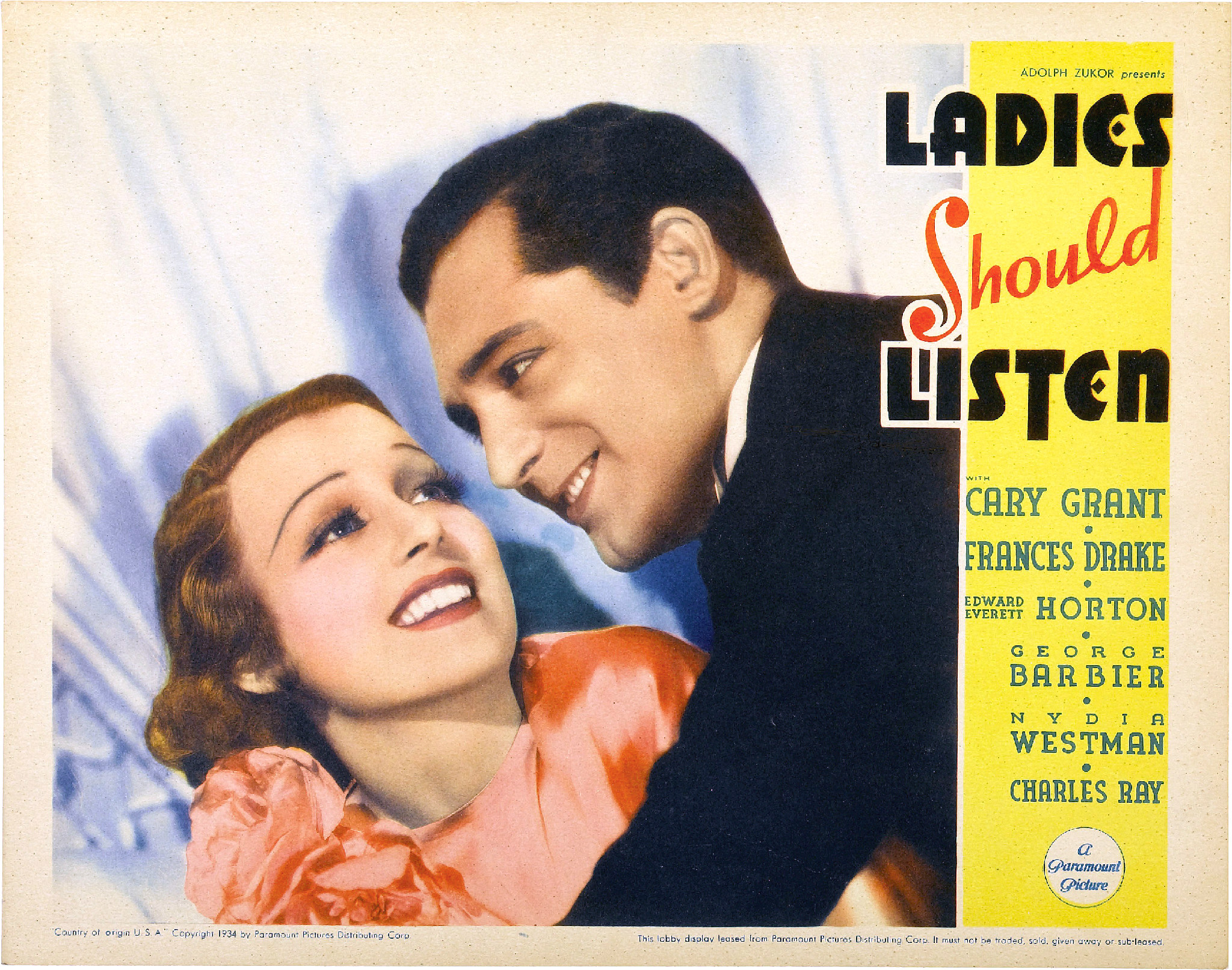
Lobby card for Ladies Should Listen with Frances Drake and Cary Grant

- Cary Grant as Julian De Lussac
- Frances Drake as Anna Mirelle
- Edward Everett Horton as Paul Vernet
- Nydia Westman as Susi Flamberg
- Rosita Moreno as Marguerite Cintos
- Joseph North as Butler (as Joe North)
- Charles Ray as Henri, the porter
- Rafael Corio as Ramon Cintos
- George Barbier as Joseph Flamberg
- Charles Arnt as Albert, the manservant
- Clara Lou Sheridan (Ann Sheridan) as Adele
- Henrietta Burnside as Operator

== Reception ==
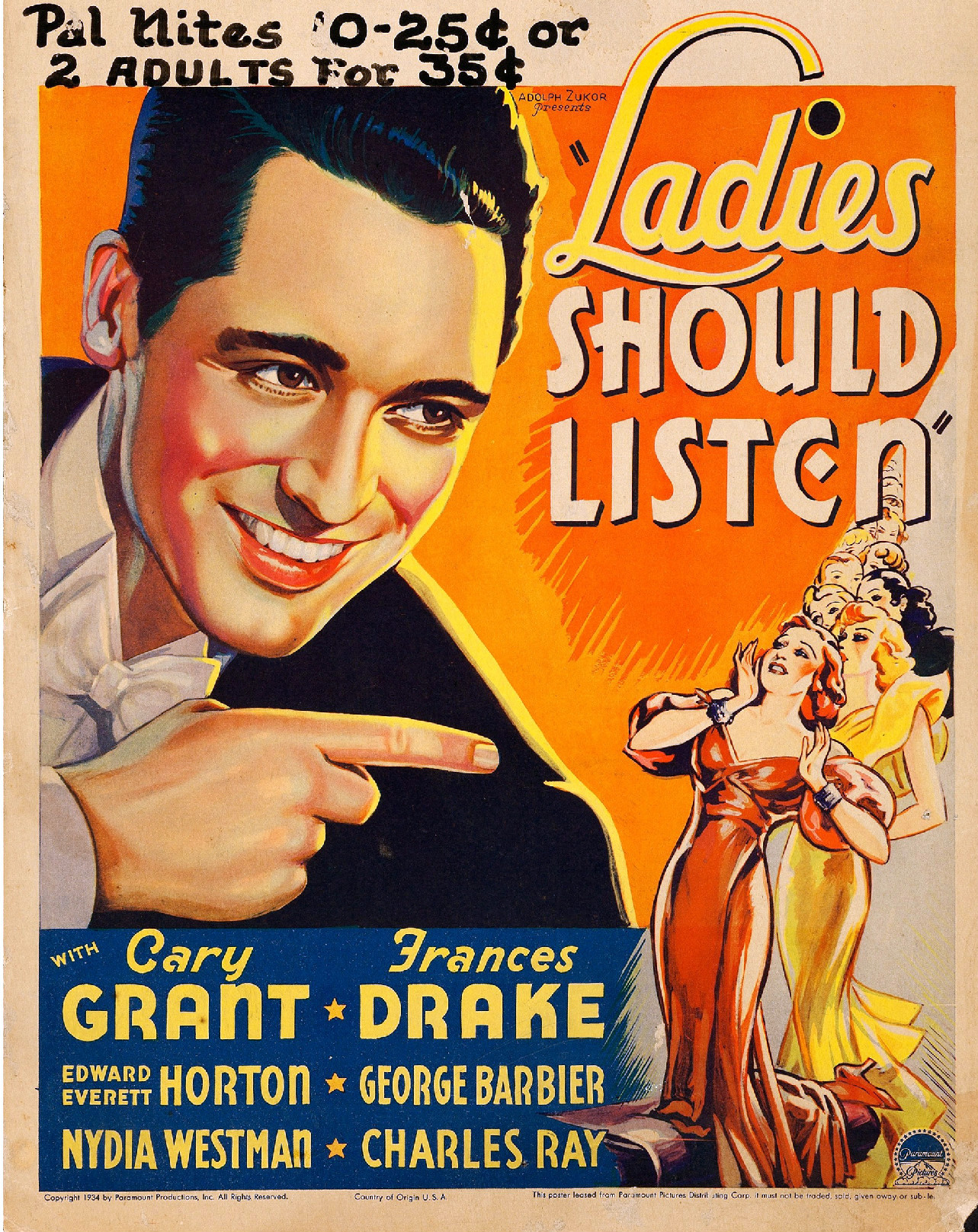
Original release poster

In a contemporary review for The New York Times, critic Frank S. Nugent wrote: "Aside from its theme, the Paramount offering has little to recommend it. There are a few brief moments when the spectator entertains some hope that the picture is getting into the farce stride, but the promise is not kept; the film sags painfully. It resorts to a number of dull and more than faintly reminiscent situations, and the dialogue sparkles but seldom."

Wolfe Kaufman of Variety wrote that Grant was "brutally miscast" but Rob Wagner of Script wrote that he was "particularly pleased" with Grant, comparing him to Clark Gable in It Happened One Night with his ability to "surprise everyone with his delightful flair for light comedy."

== Sources ==
- Deschner, Donald (1973). The Complete Films of Cary Grant. Citadel Press. ISBN 0-8065-0376-9.
