= Dangerous Assignment =

American radio series 1949–1953 and television series 1951-1952

Dangerous Assignment is an NBC Radio drama starring Brian Donlevy broadcast in the US 1949–1953, a syndicated television series distributed in the US 1951–1952 (also starring Brian Donlevy), and an Australian radio series broadcast in 1954-1956 as remakes of the original American radio scripts.

== Series premise ==
"The Commissioner" sent US special agent Steve Mitchell to exotic locales all over the world, where he would encounter adventure and international intrigue in pursuit of some secret. Each show would always open with a brief teaser scene from the episode to follow. After the intro, Steve Mitchell would be summoned to the office of 'The Commissioner', the regional head of an unnamed US State Department agency created to address international unrest as it affected U.S. interests. "The Commissioner" would give background information, explain the current situation and tell Steve his assignment. Steve's cover identity, in almost all his adventures, was that of a suave debonair foreign correspondent for an unnamed print publication — his assignments invariably involved deceit, trickery, and violence, all tied together into a successful resolution by the end of the episode.

== Radio series ==
Dangerous Assignment
- Genre: Spy
- Running time: 30 minutes
- Country of origin: United States
- Language: English
- TV adaptations: Dangerous Assignment
- Starring: Brian Donlevy; Herb Butterfield
- Created by: Brian Donlevy
- Original release: July 9, 1949 – July 8, 1953
- No. of series: Four years with a weekly broadcast
- No. of episodes: 167+
- Audio format: Monaural

Dangerous Assignment started out as a replacement radio series broadcast in the US on the NBC radio network in the summer of 1949; it became a syndicated series (produced in Australia) in early 1954. Reportedly, star Brian Donlevy himself was the one who brought the show to NBC.

In the American radio shows, Donlevy was both the protagonist within the action and the narrator, giving the show "a suspenseful immediacy." The only other regular actor on the radio shows was Herb Butterfield, who played "The Commissioner." Many stage and screen actors appeared as guest-stars including, among many others, William Conrad, Raymond Burr, Paul Frees, Jim Davis, Dan O'Herlihy, Richard Boone, and Eddie Cantor.

The Australian series was begun as a result of the popularity of the American series—scripts from shows already broadcast in the US were re-done with Australian actors in 1954. The Australian producers re-created and broadcast thirty-nine episodes from 1954 on.

=== Summer 1949 series ===
The radio show started out as a seven-week summer replacement series broadcast on NBC Saturdays 8:30–9 PM EST. It premiered July 9, 1949; the last episode was on August 20, 1949. A character portraying the Commissioner's secretary, 'Ruthie', was played by Betty Moran — it is hinted that there was some romantic history between Ruthie and Steve Mitchell.

==== Episodes ====
The seven episodes were each twenty-five minutes long:

- Thropp Foundation Stolen Relief Supplies, set in Messina, Sicily, was broadcast July 9, 1949.
- Investigate Malayan Star Line Sabotage, set in Saigon, French Indochina, was broadcast July 16, 1949.
- On Safari for Nigerian Manganese, set in Nigeria, West Africa, was broadcast July 23, 1949.
- --Title Unknown--, set in Mexico City, Mexico, was broadcast July 30, 1949.
- Investigate Millionaire Murder Conspiracy, set in Paris, France, was broadcast August 6, 1949.
- Smash Illegal Alien Smuggling Ring, set in Masimbra, Portugal, was broadcast August 13, 1949.
- Recover File No. 307, set in Zurich, Switzerland, was broadcast August 20, 1949.

=== 1950–1953 American series ===
The Summer 1949 series was very well-received, but NBC had no room for a new series in its Fall 1949 schedule. The radio show finally did return to the airwaves on February 6, 1950, in the 10:30 PM Monday timeslot formerly occupied by The Dave Garroway Show (originating from Chicago and syndicated nationwide), which was moved an hour later to 11:30 PM. The show moved over the next three years to Wednesday nights, then Saturday nights, then Tuesday nights, and then finally ended its run during its last few months in 1953 back on Wednesday nights. Some of the sponsors included the Ford Motor Company, Wheaties cereal, Anacin painkiller, Chesterfield cigarettes, and the RCA Victor record label, but the show, for the most part, was sustained solely by the NBC network for over half of its entire run with promos for other NBC shows. The series ran every week from its premiere date until the last show was broadcast in the US on July 8, 1953.

The second year of the radio series and the year of the television series were concurrent.

==== Episodes ====
There are at least 160 episodes in the 1950–53 American radio series. Episode titles became fairly standardized, starting with a verb, and describing the assignment: Find Szabo and The Briefcase, Keep Chromite Mine Operating, Intercept Dr. Korvel Before Opposition, etc.

=== 1954 Australian series ===
As the American radio series ended its last year, negotiation and production began for an Australian radio version. Produced by Grace Gibson Transcriptions, this version of Dangerous Assignment re-did 52 episodes of the full American run, with Lloyd Burrell playing Steve Mitchell — this radio series was broadcast in Australia in 1954 to 1956 and the following years.

== Television series ==
Dangerous Assignment
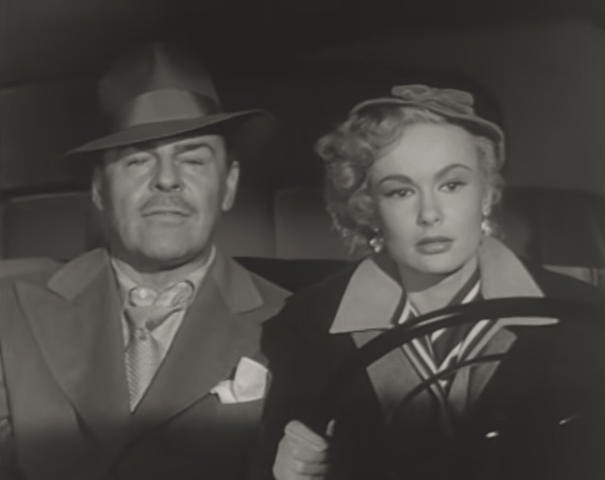
- Brian Donlevy & Suzanne Dalbert in the TV series Dangerous Assignment, episode "The Key Story"
- Genre: Spy
- Created by: Brian Donlevy
- Developed by: Brian Donlevy
- Directed by: Bill Karn
- Starring: Brian Donlevy; Herb Butterfield
- Theme music composer: Basil George ("Buzz") Adlam; Von Dexter
- Country of origin: United States
- No. of seasons: 1
- No. of episodes: 39

Production
- Executive producer: Harold E. Knox
- Cinematography: Lester H. White, A.S.C.
- Editors: Maurice Wright; Edward Schroeder
- Running time: 30 minutes
- Production company: Donlevy Development Inc.

Original release
- Network: NBC
- Release: September 1, 1951 – June 1, 1952

A syndicated television series named Dangerous Assignment was broadcast in the US in syndication (but mostly on the NBC television network). It ran during the 1951–52 television season. Donlevy formed a production company to convert the radio show to a television show — but no TV network would invest in the series; instead, Donlevy produced thirty-nine episodes with his own cash and sold them to individual stations nationwide in First-Run Syndication (though NBC did aid in the distribution via its subsidiary NBC-TV Film Syndicate Sales) — price per episode ranged from $75 to $2000, depending on the population and demographics in the buyer's region.

=== Production ===
Production credits:

- Assistant Director: William McGarry
- Production Supervisor: Frank Parmenter
- Assistant Director: William McGarry
- Production Designer: George Van Marter
- Set Decoration: George Milo
- Film Editor: Edward Schroeder, A.C.E.
- Wardrobe: Charles Keehne
- Sound: Earl Snyder
- Makeup: David Newell
- Casting: Harvey Clermont
- Production Assistant: Edward Denault
- Special Effects: Harry Redmond Jr.

=== Episodes ===
All episodes starred Brian Donlevy as Steve Mitchell and Herb Butterfield as "The Commissioner." Robert Ryf wrote most of the scripts. Among the more famous guest stars were Hugh Beaumont, Paul Frees, Elena Verdugo, Harry Guardino, Lyle Talbot, John Dehner, Michael Ansara, Jim Davis, and Strother Martin, many of them appearing as different characters in different episodes.

No.	Title	Original release date
1	"The Alien Smuggler Story" "Alien Smuggling Ring"	1952
Steve travels to Portugal to help a friend, a gangster-turned-informer, investigate a scam that supposedly smuggles political refugees into the United States. Guest cast: Jane Adams, Paul Marion, Ralph Moody
2	"The Submarine Story"	1952
Steve tries to discover the identity of the leader of some gunrunners. Guest cast: Robert Easton, Paul Dubov, Dayton Lummis
3	"The Displaced Persons Story"	1952
Refugees on a ship bound for a new home are terrorized by an unknown saboteur. Guest cast: Henry Rowland, Pamela Duncan
4	"The Memory Chain"	1952
Steve Mitchell is assigned to smash a spy ring that works only by word of mouth. Guest cast: Jeanne Bates
5	"The Manger Story"	1952
Steve, in Stockholm to investigate a college professor who is running secrets from the United States, meets a European scientist desperate for the safe return of his kidnapped son. Guest cast: Maria Palmer, Hugh Beaumont, Gavin Muir
6	"The Key Story"	1952
In the Swiss Alps, Steve is sent to find a document that proves the leader of a country friendly with the United States did not kill themselves, but was murdered. Guest cast: Suzanne Dalbert, Stanley Waxman, Hans Herbert
7	"The Bhandara Story"	1952
In Bombay, India, Steve tries to clear an imprisoned American citizen charged with sabotage. Guest cast: Neyle Morrow, Leonard Strong, Shep Menken
8	"The Salami Story"	1952
Steve accompanies the head of an American plastics company to a conference in France. Guest cast: Elena Verdugo, Laura Mason, Dan Seymour
39	"The Mine Story"	1952
Steve is smuggled into a slave labor camp In Eastern Europe to get vital information. Guest cast: Fritz Field, Joseph Mell
11	"The Italian Movie Story"	1952
In Rome, Steve tries to recover a roll of film stolen from a movie company. Guest cast: Jorja Cartwright, Fritz Feld
12	"The Blood-Stained Feather Story" "Order of the Sacred Dove"	1952
In Cairo, Steve tries to dismantle the Order of the Sacred Dove, a dangerous secret society of assassins. Guest cast: Bruce Lester, Wyott Ordung, Martha Wentworth
13	"The Burma Temple Story"	1952
Steve travels to Burma to find out the truth behind the death of a newspaper correspondent who had been posing as a political refugee. Guest cast: Arthur Space, Elizabeth Frazer, Robert Moody
15	"South America -- The Sunflower Seed Story"	1952
In South America, Steve tries to clear an American citizen accused of the murder of a man heading a major political party. Guest cast: Steve Pendleton, Frank Lackteen, Edgar Barrier
16	"The Caboose Story"	1952
Steve must find out if an old girlfriend, now a dangerous spy, is behind many recent acts of sabotage in Japan. Guest cast: Lyle Talbot, Frank Gerstle, Maria Palmer
17	"The Missing Diplomat Story"	1952
In Barcelona, Spain, Steve must retrieve records of top-secret conversations from a European diplomat who has disappeared, along with his daughter. Guest cast: Edgar Barrier, Lyle Talbot
18	"The Briefcase Story"	1952
Steve must discover who is trying to sabotage a meeting in Paris between representatives from the United States and three Eastern European countries. Guest cast: Laura Mason, Richard Gaines
19	"The Civil War Map Story"	1952
Steve goes to Richmond, Virginia, to find out why a foreign agent has stolen a 90-year-old Civil War map. Guest cast: Waldron Boyle, Betty Lou Gerson
20	"The Piece of String Story"	1952
In Panama, Steve must find out who has been stealing dynamite. Guest cast: Ralph Smiley, Hugh Beaumont
21	"The Iron Banner Story"	1952
In Greece, Steve, investigating how a man dead for six years could have recently been murdered, discovers a cast-iron swastika with details on Hitler's secret bank accounts. Guest cast: Ivan Triesault, Roland Varno
22	"The Dead General's Story"	1952
In the Balkans, Steve poses as a journalist to locate a murdered general's secret documents before enemy agents can get them. Guest cast: John Dehner, Nestor Paiva
23	"The Parachute Story"	1952
Steve parachutes into Eastern Europe to search for a confession that will clear the U.S. in an international scandal. Guest cast: Kristine Miller, Peter Coe
34	"The Stolen Letter"	1952
Steve is sent to South America to expose a plot against the U.S. Guest cast: Nestor Paiva, Laura Mason
35	"The Venetian Story"	1952
Steve travels to Venice to find and buy back a vital part of the agency's code machines. Guest cast: Shannon O'Neal, Larry Dobkin, Strother Martin
26	"The Bodyguard Story"	March 10, 1952
In Paris, a bowl of cold stew gives Steve a clue to a political assassin's identity. Guest cast: James Flavin, Laura Mason
27	"The Art Treasure Story"	March 17, 1952
In Mexico, Steve is in search of Habsburg art treasures hidden by Nazis. Guest cast: Adele jergens, Joseph Mell, John Parish
33	"Death in the Morgue Story"	March 24, 1952
A morgue in Morocco is Steve's headquarters as he probes sabotage at an American air base. Guest cast: Harry Guardion, Franchesca de Scaffia, David Ormont
25	"The Atomic Mine Story"	March 31, 1952
Steve uses a Geiger counter to find a bomb-carrying killer aboard a speeding train. Guest cast: Lisa Clark, Herbert Deans
29	"The Red Queen Story"	April 7, 1952
In Singapore, Steve searches for $1 million cache of rubber stolen from the United States. Guest cast: Alfred Santos, Percy Helton, Mabel Paige
28	"The One Blue Chip Story"	April 14, 1952
Steve, posing as a criminal, infiltrates a counterfeiting ring in a Macao casino. Guest cast: Michael Ansara, Douglass Dumbrille, Ted Stanhope
31	"The Assassin Ring Story" "Kill The King"	April 21, 1952
Steve travels to the Middle East to prove that the United States has nothing to do with the assassination of the king. Guest cast: Beverly Tyler, Larry Blake
10	"The Lagoon Story"	April 28, 1952
In Africa, Steve tries to locate two missing agents sent there to find a powerful germ culture. Guest cast: Patrick O'Moore, Christine Larson
36	"Berlin -- The Black Hood Story"	May 2, 1952
Steve travels to Berlin, Germany, to recover confidential papers stolen from a diplomatic courier. Guest cast: Gloria Eaton, Joseph Turkel
9	"The Pat and Mike Story"	May 12, 1952
Steve travels to an African jungle to stop a man causing trouble between local shamans. Guest cast: Nelson Leigh, John Warburton
14	"The Havana Microfilm Story"	May 19, 1952
Steve negotiates the dangerous back alleys of Havana in search of a spy in possession of stolen documents on microfilm. Guest cast: Jeanne Tatum, Howard Joslin
38	"The Perfect Alibi Story"	May 26, 1952
A political informer's murder in Rome leads to the discovery that an unknown opportunist is impersonating Steve. Guest cast: Byron Kane, Jan Arvan, Dolores Moran
30	"The Knitting Needle Story"	June 2, 1952
On an airflight to Rome, Steve protects a journalist who is about to write articles about a criminal organization that controls voters and elections in Italy. Guest cast: Clancy Cooper, Frances Rafferty
24	"The Paris Sewer Story"	June 9, 1952
The sewers of Paris lead Steve to the underground quarters of a spy ring. Guest cast: Carol Thurston, Leonard Penn
32	"The Decoy Story"	June 16, 1952
While Steve is occupied smuggling a wounded U.S. attache out of Eastern Europe, an international opportunist masquerades as Steve Mitchell. Guest cast: Laura Mason, Jim Davis
37	"The Archeaological Story" "Desert Patrol"	June 23, 1952
Steve travels to Trans-Jordan in the Middle East to find and protect a missing goddess. Guest cast: Lyle Talbot, Henry Corden

== Critical reception ==
The American radio show, perhaps due to the fact that it immediately preceded the blockbuster radio series The Man Called X, was extremely popular: "The program was clearly well received, was building a loyal audience for the full-hour block of foreign adventure drama it presented", although some radio fans found the American radio series "never quite overcoming the absolute predictability of the stories."

American television critics were not that much more enthusiastic: "...a television version of a pedestrian radio spy series."
