= There's Always a Woman =

1938 film by Alexander Hall

- Directed by: Alexander Hall
- Screenplay by: Gladys Lehman
- Story by: Wilson Collison
- Produced by: William Perlberg
- Starring: Joan Blondell; Melvyn Douglas
- Cinematography: Henry Freulich
- Edited by: Viola Lawrence
- Color process: Black and white
- Production company: Columbia Pictures
- Distributed by: Columbia Pictures
- Release date: April 20, 1938
- Running time: 81 minutes
- Country: United States
- Language: English

There's Always a Woman is a 1938 American comedy mystery film directed by Alexander Hall and starring Joan Blondell and Melvyn Douglas. Seeing the potential for a series, Columbia Pictures quickly made a sequel, There's That Woman Again, released the same year, with Douglas reprising his role, but with Virginia Bruce as Sally. No further sequels were made.

== Plot ==
Bill Reardon's (Melvyn Douglas) private detective agency is not making any money, so he decides to swallow his pride and return to work for the district attorney as a special investigator. His wife Sally (Joan Blondell), who persuaded him to start his own business, decides to keep the agency going herself.

Sally is quickly hired by Lola Fraser (Mary Astor) to investigate Anne Calhoun (Frances Drake), a former girlfriend of Lola's husband Walter (Lester Matthews) who has been in contact with him. At a nightclub owned by Nick Shane (Jerome Cowan), pretending to be out with Bill for pleasure rather than business, Sally witnesses Anne's angry fiancé Jerry Marlowe (Robert Paige) threatening Walter, and before long Walter ends up dead.

Jerry is the prime suspect. Mr. Ketterling (Pierre Watkin), Jerry's employer, talks him into hiring Sally to prove him innocent. Shane could be behind it, she figures, but his body is found in the Reardons' apartment, where Sally catches a whiff of a familiar perfume, Lola's. Escaping police custody as a murder suspect, Sally gets Lola to sign a confession that she killed Shane in self defense by pretending to have found her handkerchief at the scene of the crime. However, Bill arrests Lola for hiring Shane to kill Walter to inherit all of his estate instead of getting a divorce settlement. When Shane started blackmailing her, she killed him.

== Cast ==
- Joan Blondell as Sally Reardon
- Melvyn Douglas as William Reardon
- Mary Astor as Lola Fraser
- Frances Drake as Anne Calhoun
- Jerome Cowan as Nick Shane
- Robert Paige as Jerry Marlowe
- Thurston Hall as District Attorney
- Pierre Watkin as Mr. Ketterling
- Walter Kingsford as Grigson
- Lester Matthews as Walter Fraser
- Rita Hayworth as Mary, Ketterling's secretary (uncredited)
- William Benedict as Bellboy (uncredited)

== Reception ==
The New York Times called the film "one of the lightest and most engaging affairs of recent months" and "a 'Thin Man' of the lower-income brackets."
