= Midnight Taxi (1937 film) =

1937 film by Eugene Forde

- Directed by: Eugene Forde
- Written by: Borden Chase; John Patrick; Lou Breslow
- Based on: story by Borden Chase
- Produced by: Milton Feld
- Starring: Brian Donlevy; Frances Drake; Alan Dinehart
- Cinematography: Barney McGill
- Edited by: Alfred DeGaetano
- Music by: Samuel Kaylin
- Production company: Twentieth Century Fox
- Distributed by: Twentieth Century Fox
- Release date: April 5, 1937
- Running time: 73 minutes
- Country: United States
- Language: English

Midnight Taxi is a 1937 American crime film directed by Eugene Forde and starring Brian Donlevy, Frances Drake and Alan Dinehart.

== Plot ==
A federal agent poses as a taxi driver to infiltrate a gang of counterfeiters.

== Cast ==
- Brian Donlevy as Charles 'Chick' Gardner
- Frances Drake as Gilda Lee
- Alan Dinehart as Philip Strickland
- Sig Ruman as John B. Rudd
- Gilbert Roland as Flash Dillon
- Harold Huber as Walter 'Lucky' Todd
- Paul Stanon as Agent J. W. McNeary
- Lon Chaney Jr. as Detective Erickson
- Russell Hicks as Barney Flagg
- Regis Toomey as Hilton
- Agnes Ayres as Society Woman
- Joseph E. Bernard as Copy Reader
- Edgar Dearing as Officer Murray
- John Dilson as Doc Wilson
- James Flavin as Detective McCormick
- Creighton Hale as G-Man
- Sherry Hall as Monte
- Eddie Hart as Detective Morton
- Otto Hoffman as Louie the Tailor
- Frank Marlowe as Sailor
- Paul McVey as Robert Powers
- Frank Mills as Gas Station Attendant
- Frank O'Connor as FBI Agent
- Lee Phelps as Chief of Detectives
- Arthur Rankin as Sailor
- Pedro Regas as Dazetta
- Jeffrey Sayre as Buck
- Harry Semels as Joe, Counterman
- Harry Strang as FBI Agent
- Zeffie Tilbury as Mrs. Lane
- Hughey White as Newspaper Vendor
- Norman Willis as Jefferson

== Bibliography ==
- Smith, Don G. Lon Chaney, Jr.: Horror Film Star, 1906-1973. McFarland, 2004.
