= Romance in Manhattan =

1935 film by Stephen Roberts

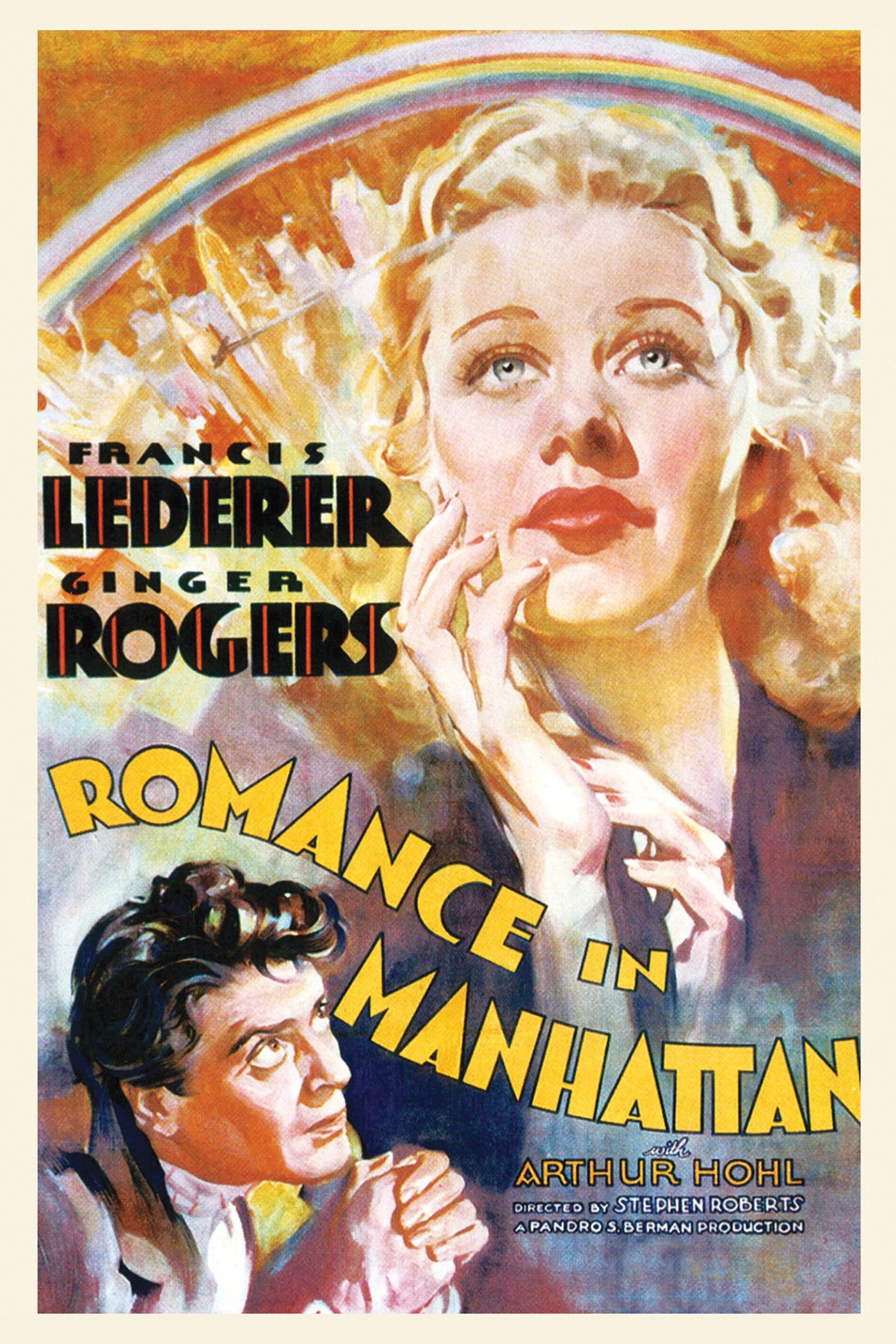
- Theatrical release poster
- Directed by: Stephen Roberts
- Screenplay by: Jane Murfin; Edward Kaufman
- Story by: Norman Krasna; Don Hartman
- Produced by: Pandro S. Berman
- Starring: Francis Lederer; Ginger Rogers; Arthur Hohl
- Cinematography: Nick Musuraca
- Edited by: Jack Hively
- Music by: Al Colombo
- Production company: RKO Radio Pictures
- Distributed by: RKO Radio Pictures
- Release date: December 21, 1934 (Minneapolis)
- Running time: 78 minutes
- Country: United States
- Language: English

Romance in Manhattan is a 1934 American romantic comedy-drama film directed by Stephen Roberts and starring Francis Lederer and Ginger Rogers. Released by RKO Radio Pictures, the film follows a Czechoslovak immigrant (Lederer) who enters the United States illegally and is taken under the wing of a New York City chorus girl (Rogers).

== Plot ==
Karel Novak, a naive Czechoslovak immigrant, arrives at Ellis Island with $58, thinking he only needed $50 to enter the United States, only to discover that the immigration fee has since been raised to $200. Unable to pay, Karel is placed on a steamship for deportation, but jumps out of a porthole and is fished out of the East River by a group of dock workers, losing his wallet in the process. He wanders the streets of Manhattan and into a theatre where he eats a doughnut left by chorus girls. One of the girls, 19-year-old Sylvia Dennis, invites him to sit down and eat. He refuses money and instead asks for a job. Sylvia tells him to come by her apartment, as her brother might be able to help him.

In her apartment, Sylvia finds two female social workers talking to her 11-year-old brother Frank, who missed two days of school in favor of working as a newsboy to help support his sister financially. The social workers suggest sending Frank away to an orphanage, but Sylvia vehemently refuses. When Karel arrives, he and Frank make a deal for Karel to sell newspapers during the day so Frank can attend school, with Frank taking over in the afternoons. Sylvia offers Karel to sleep on the rooftop.

The next day, when Karel goes out to dinner with Sylvia and Frank, one of the dock workers who helped Karel ashore approaches him. Fearful of being exposed as an illegal immigrant, Karel denies any knowledge of the incident, although the dock worker merely wanted to return Karel's wallet containing $58. Some time later, Karel learns from Officer Murphy, a friend of Sylvia's, that a person could get in trouble for knowingly harboring an illegal alien.

Karel finds work as a taxi driver. Sylvia tells him her show has closed, leaving her unemployed, and he is glad that he is now the "man of the house". When the taxi drivers go on strike, Karel comes home early and helps Sylvia with the laundry. She admits that she went into show business in the hope of marrying a millionaire. Karel proclaims that he is the only millionaire Sylvia will marry and kisses her.

The two social workers ask the landlady if Karel is living in Sylvia's apartment. One day, Sylvia receives a phone call from a truant officer, informing her that Frank has been caught selling newspapers instead of being at school. In court, Sylvia claims she is 22 years old, but the judge knows she is 19 and asks her about Karel living with her. Karel explains the situation, insisting that he is simply repaying a debt. The judge believes Karel, but orders Frank to be placed in an orphanage until Sylvia she is married.

As Frank packs his suitcase, Karel leaves abruptly and visits Murphy, asking him what to do to get married. Murphy replies that he only needs $2 and suggests presenting his naturalization papers. Karel then meets with attorney Halsey J. Pander, who asks for $50 to make him a citizen immediately. The next day, Karel returns home to find Sylvia packing to run away with Frank. Karel proposes to Sylvia, who accepts after hesitating. That night, a man comes to take Frank away to the orphanage, prompting Karel to confess to Sylvia that he is in the country illegally but expects to become a citizen by the next day.

Karel is taken to the police station after Pander turned him in for a bounty. Murphy intervenes by arresting Pander, who is falsely accused of drunk driving and resisting arrest. The police sergeant makes calls to arrange a marriage license. While a minister performs the ceremony, Murphy is on the phone with the Immigration Office, a doctor gives Karel his vaccinations, and an official fills out the couple's marriage license. Murphy pays for Karel's immigration fee by taking the money Pander used to pay for his fines. The ceremony is finally completed, and Karel and Sylvia are married.

== Cast ==
- Francis Lederer as Karel Novak
- Ginger Rogers as Sylvia Dennis
- Arthur Hohl as Halsey J. Pander
- Jimmy Butler as Frank Dennis
- J. Farrell MacDonald as Officer Murphy
- Helen Ware as Miss Anthrop
- Eily Malyon as Miss Evans
- Lillian Harmer as Mrs. Schultz, the landlady
- Donald Meek as the minister
- Sidney Toler as Sergeant Duffy
- Oscar Apfel as the judge
- Reginald Barlow as the Chief Customs Inspector

== Production ==
Actor Francis Lederer spoke fondly of making the film, commenting that his co-star Ginger Rogers "adorable, and I became acquainted with both her and her mother. [Making Romance in Manhattan] was a marvelous experience."

== Release ==
Romance in Manahttan opened in Minneapolis, Minnesota on December 21, 1934. The film opened San Francisco on Christmas Day 1934.

== Reception ==
Romance in Manhattan received generally favorable reviews from film critics. Reviewer A. S. of The New York Times wrote that the film "makes a generally engaging light entertainment out of the slightly anemic materials" and deemed it a "friendly wisp of romantic comedy." Ann Ross of Maclean's wrote: "The story is pleasantly enough told, but Mr. Lederer's performance is so good that he seems entitled to a more impressive picture."

Time magazine praised the film, noting: "Pleasantly played by its principals and directed by Stephen Roberts in the Capra tradition, all this makes an entertaining small-fry comedy, distinguished by its skyline and a few exceptionally funny sequences."

== See also ==
- List of American films of 1934
