= Star of Midnight =

1935 film by Stephen Roberts

- Theatrical release poster
- Directed by: Stephen Roberts
- Written by: Howard J. Green; Edward Kaufman
- Based on: Star of Midnight by Arthur Somers Roche
- Produced by: Robert Arthur
- Starring: William Powell; Ginger Rogers; Paul Kelly
- Cinematography: J. Roy Hunt
- Edited by: Arthur Roberts
- Music by: Max Steiner
- Production company: RKO Pictures
- Distributed by: RKO Pictures
- Release date: April 10, 1935 (San Francisco)
- Running time: 90 minutes
- Country: United States
- Language: English
- Budget: $280,000
- Box office: $831,000

Star of Midnight is a 1935 American comedy mystery film directed by Stephen Roberts and starring William Powell, Ginger Rogers, and Paul Kelly. The film follows an attorney investigating the disappearance of a dancer who vanished from a Chicago theater. It is based on the 1936 novel of the same name by Arthur Somers Roche.

== Plot ==
New York lawyer and playboy Clay "Dal" Dalzell is asked by old friend Tim Winthrop to locate his girlfriend Alice, who mysteriously disappeared in Chicago a year ago. Winthrop cannot stop thinking about her, and he believes she is in New York.

Along with Donna Mantin, who has romantic designs on him, Dal attends a hit stage show titled "Midnight" that stars a masked actress, Mary Smith, who vanishes in mid-performance when Winthrop recognizes her and blurts out the name Alice.

Gossip columnist Tommy Tennant claims to have discovered a vital clue to the mystery, but before he can reveal it, he is shot in Dal's suite. Dal is the main suspect, but Inspector Doremus does not believe him to be guilty, and he gives the resourceful lawyer the freedom to investigate on his own.

Dal negotiates with gangster Kinland to retrieve letters embarrassing to Donna. When he gets them (using a bit of blackmail), he is annoyed to discover that they actually belong to a friend of Donna.

Dal is visited by an old flame, Jerry, now wed to a lawyer named Classon. Classon, it turns out, is searching for Alice too; she can provide an alibi for his client, convicted of a murder in Chicago.

Dal sets up a trap in a Greenwich Village apartment, pretending to have located the missing Mary there and notifying each of the suspects that she is leaving there to meet him at his suite. He speculates that those who are innocent will go to his suite while the murderer heads to the apartment to silence Mary.

The killer indeed turns up, in disguise, putting Dal and Donna in grave danger. Fortunately, Dal and Inspector Doremus are able to subdue the culprit. It is Robert Classon. It turns out that Jerry had carried on affairs, first with the Chicago murder victim, then with his accused killer. Robert Classon killed one of his wife's lovers and tried to frame the other. To achieve the latter, he needed to silence Alice, unaware that she had fled to avoid testifying. She hated the convicted man for ruining her father.

With everything wrapped up, Dal marries Donna.

== Cast ==
- William Powell as Clay "Dal" Dalzell
- Ginger Rogers as Donna Mantin
- Paul Kelly as Jim Kinland
- Gene Lockhart as Horace Swayne, Dal's butler
- Ralph Morgan as Robert Classon
- Leslie Fenton as Tim Winthrop
- J. Farrell MacDonald as Police Inspector Doremus
- Russell Hopton as Tommy Tennant
- Vivien Oakland as Jerry Classon
- Robert Emmett O'Connor as Police Sergeant Clearey
- Bess Flowers as Mary Smith (uncredited)
- George Chandler as Witness (uncredited)

== Release ==
Star of Midnight had its world premiere in San Francisco on April 10, 1935. It opened at Radio City Music Hall in New York City the following day. The film was released in Cedar Rapids, Iowa on April 20, 1935.

=== Home media ===
Star of Midnight has been released on VHS as part of the RKO Collection and on DVD in Italy (region 2) as La Maschera Di Mezzanotte, with Italian and English soundtracks. The Warner Archive Collection released the film on DVD-R on May 31, 2012.

== Reception ==
=== Box office ===
The film was popular at the U.S. box office, earning RKO a profit of $265,000.

=== Critical response ===
In his New York Times review, Andre Sennwald called it a "sleek, witty and engaging entertainment". Noting the similarities to the previous year's The Thin Man (also starring Powell as a debonaire detective), however, Sennwald concluded "it is never quite as satisfying as its illustrious predecessor." Writing for The Spectator, Graham Greene also drew comparisons between the film's craftsmanship and that of The Thin Man (as well as The Trunk Mystery), describing Star of Midnight as "a light, quick, sophisticated comedy ... all suavity and amusement, pistol-shots and cocktails".
