= Stephen Roberts (director) =

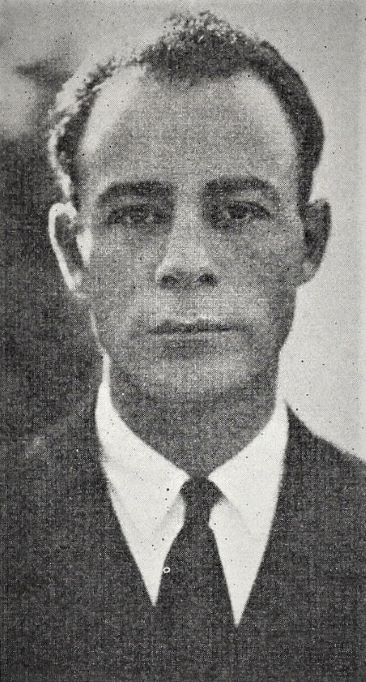
- From a 1926 magazine
- Born: November 23, 1895; Summersville, West Virginia
- Died: July 17, 1936 (aged 40); Los Angeles, California
- Other name: Stephen R. Roberts
- Years active: 1923-1936

Stephen Roberts (23 November 1895 – 17 July 1936) was an American film director. He directed more than 100 films from 1923 to 1936. He was born in Summersville, West Virginia.

During World War I, Steve Roberts was an aviator. After the war, he bought his own airplanes and toured America with a flying circus, playing for county fairs and carnivals. His airborne career ended in Texas, when after he performed tailspins, spirals, and other dangerous maneuvers, his engine failed and the plane crashed 3,000 feet below. "It's a good thing it was only a 3,000-foot drop," quipped Roberts. "If it had been 3,500 I might have been hurt."

Like many established directors of the 1930s, Roberts had broken into motion pictures a decade earlier as a director of silent films. Roberts began as an assistant to director Bryan Foy in a Ken Maynard feature. Roberts was then employed by Educational Pictures, a prolific producer of short comedies, where he remained on the directorial staff from 1924 to 1930. When comedian Slim Summerville was filming a series of short talking comedies in 1930, Universal Pictures hired Roberts to direct them.

In 1932, Roberts joined Paramount Pictures, where he was equally comfortable with comedy and drama. He made a string of popular features, most famously the multidirector omnibus If I Had a Million (1932; Roberts directed the Wynne Gibson and May Robson segments) and The Story of Temple Drake (1933, originally The Shame of Temple Drake, loosely based on William Faulkner's Sanctuary). Roberts's luck ran out in 1934, when an ill-suited George Raft vehicle, The Trumpet Blows (with Raft as a Mexican bandit), misfired at the box office.

Roberts moved to RKO Radio Pictures later in 1934 and regained his stride as an efficient, all-purpose director. His last film was the William Powell-Jean Arthur comedy The Ex-Mrs. Bradford (1936); Roberts died of a heart attack two months after the film's release.

== Selected filmography ==
- Cheer Up (1924) with Cliff Bowes, Virginia Vance, Eddie Boland
- The Radio Bug (1926) short comedy filmed in both silent and Phonofilm versions
- Listen Lena (1927)
- Lady and Gent (1932)
- If I Had a Million (1932)
- The Story of Temple Drake (1933)
- The Trumpet Blows (1934)
- Romance in Manhattan (1935)
- Star of Midnight 1935, RKO. Source: Graham Greene on Film, Simon and Schuster 1972, p. 14.
- The Ex-Mrs. Bradford (1936)
