= Ben Welden =

American actor (1901–1997)

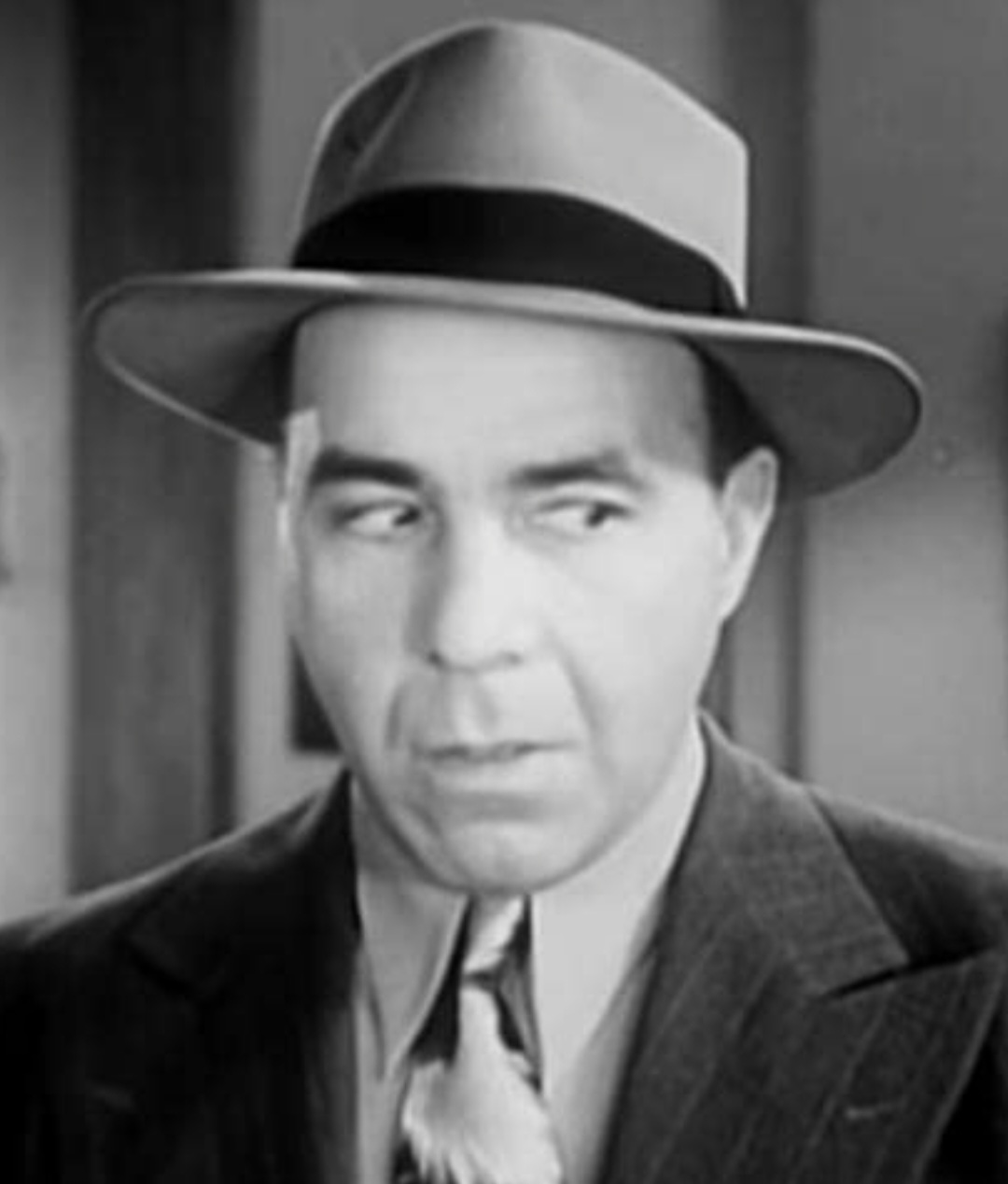
- Welden in The Missing Corpse (1945)
- Born: Benjamin Weinblatt; June 12, 1901; Toledo, Ohio, U.S.
- Died: October 17, 1997 (aged 96); Woodland Hills, Los Angeles, U.S.
- Occupation: Actor
- Years active: 1930–1966
- Spouse: Amy Louise Gaunt Welden (1909–1995)

Ben Welden (born Benjamin Weinblatt; June 12, 1901 – October 17, 1997) was an American character actor who played a wide variety of Damon Runyon-type gangsters in various movies and television shows.

== Early years ==
Welden was born in Toledo, Ohio. He served in the U.S. Army during World War II.

== Career ==
Welden's film debut occurred in the British production The Man from Chicago (1930). After freelancing for several years, he signed with Warner Bros. in 1937.

Short, balding and somewhat rotund, Welden often literally played a "heavy", frequently in a somewhat comical or slightly dim-witted way, offsetting the sinister nature of his character's actions. Among his roles in this vein was as a goon in The Big Sleep (1946), and as a smart-mouth tavern owner in The Roaring Twenties (1939).

Fans of Adventures of Superman remember him well. He appeared in eight episodes, always as a different character and yet really the same character, in a way. His best-known Superman episode might be "Flight to the North", in which he tries (and fails) to outwit a country-bumpkin type (played by Chuck Connors). In 1966, he acted in episodes 47 and 48 of Batman featuring Vincent Price as Special Guest Villain "Egghead". He also played a supporting role in the Three Stooges short, "Three Dark Horses." (1952)

He appeared in six episodes of The Lone Ranger ("Two Gold Lockets", 1951, "Delayed Action", 1952, "Right to Vote", 1953, "Stage to Tishomingo", 1954, "Trouble at Tylerville", 1956, & "Outlaws in Greasepaint", 1957). He continued to work in television until 1966.

== Personal life ==
After retiring from the screen, Welden owned a confection company called Nutcorn, located in Beverly Hills.

== Death ==
Welden died at age 96 on October 17, 1997, at the Motion Picture & Television Country House and Hospital in Woodland Hills, California.

== Filmography ==
- The Man from Chicago (1930) - Ted (film debut)
- Big Business (1930) - Fenchurch
- 77 Park Lane (1931) - Sinclair
- The Missing Rembrandt (1932) - Pinkerton Agent (uncredited)
- The Innocents of Chicago (1932) - Spike Guinan
- Tin Gods (1932) - Cyrus P. Schroeder
- His Lordship (1932) - Washington Roosevelt Lincoln
- Born Lucky (1933) - Harriman
- His Grace Gives Notice (1933) - Michael Collier
- This Is the Life (1933) - Two Gun Mullins
- Mannequin (1933) - Chris Dempson
- The Pride of the Force (1933) - Tony Carlotti
- The Medicine Man (1933) - Joe Garbel
- Their Night Out (1933) - Crook
- Send 'em Back Half Dead (1933) - Mustapha
- Puppets of Fate (1933)
- Mr. Quincey of Monte Carlo (1933) - Grover Jones
- Home, Sweet Home (1933) - Santos
- General John Regan (1933) - Billing
- The Black Abbot (1934) - Charlie Marsh
- The River Wolves (1934) - Flash Lawson
- The Fire Raisers (1934) - Bellini - Stedding's Henchman (uncredited)
- The Man Who Changed His Name (1934) - Jerry Muller
- Aunt Sally (1934) - Casino
- Gay Love (1934) - Ben
- The Big Splash (1935) - Crook
- The Triumph of Sherlock Holmes (1935) - Ted Balding
- Annie, Leave the Room! (1935) - Raisins
- Royal Cavalcade (1935) - Businessman
- Death on the Set (1935) - Freshman
- Alibi Inn (1935) - Saunders
- Admirals All (1935) - Adolph Klotz
- The Mystery of the Mary Celeste (1935) - Boas 'Sailor' Hoffman
- Come Out of the Pantry (1935) - Tramp
- Trust the Navy (1935) - Scar
- The Improper Duchess (1936) - Macabe
- The Avenging Hand (1936) - Slug Clarke (uncredited)
- She Knew What She Wanted (1936) - Chester
- The Man Who Could Work Miracles (1936) - San Francisco Reporter (uncredited)
- Hot News (1936) - Slug Wilson
- Westbound Mail (1937) - Steve Hickman
- The Great Barrier (1937) - Joe
- Maytime (1937) - Student (uncredited)
- The King and the Chorus Girl (1937) - First Waiter (uncredited)
- Marked Woman (1937) - Charlie Delaney
- Kid Galahad (1937) - Buzz Barett
- Another Dawn (1937) - Victor Romkoff - Tobacco Tycoon (uncredited)
- Confession (1937) - Defense Attorney
- That Certain Woman (1937) - Headwaiter Harry Aqueilli (uncredited)
- Varsity Show (1937) - Hammer
- Back in Circulation (1937) - Sam Sherman
- Love Is on the Air (1937) - 'Nicey' Ferguson
- Alcatraz Island (1937) - 'Red' Carroll
- The Great Garrick (1937) - Blacksmith at Turk's Head (uncredited)
- The Last Gangster (1937) - Bottles Bailey (uncredited)
- The Duke Comes Back (1937) - Barney
- Missing Witnesses (1937) - Frank Wagner
- Love and Hisses (1937) - Bugsy (uncredited)
- City Girl (1938) - Blake's Valet (uncredited)
- Happy Landing (1938) - Manager Skating Rink
- Prison Nurse (1938) - Gaffney
- Mystery House (1938) - Gerald Frawley
- The Saint in New York (1938) - Boots Papinoff
- Always Goodbye (1938) - 1st New York Taxi Driver
- Crime Ring (1938) - Nate
- Gateway (1938) - Motorboat Man (uncredited)
- Smashing the Rackets (1938) - Whitey Clark
- Tenth Avenue Kid (1938) - Marty Dayton
- Time Out for Murder (1938) - Lefty (uncredited)
- Straight, Place and Show (1938) - Promoter
- The Night Hawk (1938) - Otto Miller
- Up the River (1938) - Coach Larkin (uncredited)
- Little Orphan Annie (1938) - Spot McGee
- The Girl Downstairs (1938) - Policeman (uncredited)
- Federal Man-Hunt (1938) - Goldie
- Stand Up and Fight (1939) - Foreman (uncredited)
- The Lone Wolf Spy Hunt (1939) - Jenks
- Pardon Our Nerve (1939) - Captain of Waiters (uncredited)
- I Was a Convict (1939) - Rocks Henry
- Sergeant Madden (1939) - Henchman Stemmy
- Boys' Reformatory (1939) - Mike Hearn
- Rose of Washington Square (1939) - Toby
- Fugitive at Large (1939) - Convict (uncredited)
- The Star Maker (1939) - Joe Gimlick
- Hollywood Cavalcade (1939) - Agent
- The Roaring Twenties (1939) - Tavern Proprietor (uncredited)
- The Earl of Chicago (1940) - Silky's Driver (uncredited)
- Wolf of New York (1940) - Owney McGill
- Outside the Three-Mile Limit (1940) - Lefty Shores
- Tear Gas Squad (1940) - Sully, Rocks' Partner (uncredited)
- Passport to Alcatraz (1940) - Bender
- South of Pago Pago (1940) - Grimes
- City for Conquest (1940) - Cobb
- The Strawberry Blonde (1941) - Reluctant Convict Dental Patient (uncredited)
- Mr. District Attorney (1941) - Monk Westman (uncredited)
- Knockout (1941) - Pelky
- Men of Boys Town (1941) - Superintendent
- Strange Alibi (1941) - Durkin
- I'll Wait for You (1941) - Dr. Anderson
- Manpower (1941) - Al Hurst
- Nine Lives Are Not Enough (1941) - Moxie Karper
- Fiesta (1941) - Policeman (uncredited)
- Dangerously They Live (1941) - Eddie
- All Through the Night (1942) - Smitty
- A Close Call for Ellery Queen (1942) - Watchman
- Bullet Scars (1942) - Pills Davis
- Maisie Gets Her Man (1942) - Percy Podd
- Highways by Night (1942) - Tony Delewese (uncredited)
- Secrets of the Underground (1942) - Henchman Joe
- Stand by for Action (1942) - Chief Quartermaster Rankin
- Here Comes Elmer (1943) - Louis Burch
- The Fighting Seabees (1944) - Yump Lumkin
- The Desert Hawk (1944, Serial) - Omar, the Beggar
- Shadows in the Night (1944) - Nick Kallus
- Circumstantial Evidence (1945) - Kenny
- It's in the Bag! (1945) - Monty - Bookie
- The Missing Corpse (1945) - 'Slippery Joe' Clary
- Midnight Manhunt (1945) - Hotel Manager (uncredited)
- Follow That Woman (1945) - Joe (uncredited)
- Cinderella Jones (1946) - Truck Driver (uncredited)
- Dangerous Business (1946) - Moxie (uncredited)
- Anna and the King of Siam (1946) - Third Judge (uncredited)
- The Last Crooked Mile (1946) - Haynes
- The Big Sleep (1946) - Pete, Mars' flunky (uncredited)
- Angel on My Shoulder (1946) - Shaggsy (uncredited)
- Mr. Hex (1946) - Bull Laguna
- The Man I Love (1947) - Jack Atlas (uncredited)
- Sinbad the Sailor (1947) - Commoner (uncredited)
- Hit Parade of 1947 (1947) - Mr. French (uncredited)
- Too Many Winners (1947) - Gil Madden / Theodore Ross
- Fiesta (1947) - Policeman (uncredited)
- Little Miss Broadway (1947) - Cash Monahan
- Blackmail (1947) - Bartender (uncredited)
- Killer Dill (1947) - Big Nick Moronie
- The Pretender (1947) - Mickie
- Heading for Heaven (1947) - Sam
- Here Comes Trouble (1948) - Rankin (uncredited)
- The Noose Hangs High (1948) - Stewart (uncredited)
- Trapped by Boston Blackie (1948) - Louis (uncredited)
- The Dude Goes West (1948) - Porgy (uncredited)
- Jinx Money (1948) - Benny the Meatball
- The Vicious Circle (1948) - Constable
- The Babe Ruth Story (1948) - Bartender (scenes deleted)
- Lady at Midnight (1948) - Willie Gold
- Smart Girls Don't Talk (1948) - Nelson Clark (uncredited)
- A Song Is Born (1948) - Monte
- My Dear Secretary (1948) - Bookie (uncredited)
- Appointment with Murder (1948) - Martin Minecci
- Fighting Fools (1949) - Lefty Conlin
- Impact (1949) - Moving Van Helper
- Search for Danger (1949) - Gregory
- Sorrowful Jones (1949) - Big Steve's Bodyguard
- The Doctor and the Girl (1949) - Patient (uncredited)
- Prison Warden (1949) - Yardbird with Cards (uncredited)
- Mary Ryan, Detective (1949) - Sammy (uncredited)
- Tough Assignment (1949) - Sniffy
- Tell It to the Judge (1949) - Augie (uncredited)
- Riders in the Sky (1949) - Dave
- The Threat (1949) - Tony Anzio (uncredited)
- Buccaneer's Girl (1950) - Tom
- The Jackie Robinson Story (1950) - Tough Lodge Member in Stands (uncredited)
- On the Isle of Samoa (1950) - Nick Leach
- The Desert Hawk (1950) - Mokar (uncredited)
- The Misadventures of Buster Keaton (1950) - Sam (uncredited)
- My True Story (1950) - Buzz Edwards
- The Lemon Drop Kid (1951) - Singing Solly
- Tales of Robin Hood (1951) - Friar Tuck
- Mask of the Avenger (1951) - Tavern Loafer (uncredited)
- The Lady and the Bandit (1951) - Barkeep in Pub (uncredited)
- Rhubarb (1951) - Oily Moe - Bookie (uncredited)
- Night Stage to Galveston (1952) - Arresting Patrolman (uncredited)
- Captain Pirate (1952) - Martinique Policeman (uncredited)
- Tropical Heat Wave (1952) - Abbot (uncredited)
- Three Dark Horses (1952, Short) - Jim Digger
- All Ashore (1953) - Hugo - Bartender
- Thunder Bay (1953) - Fisherman (uncredited)
- The Veils of Bagdad (1953) - Stout Wrestler (uncredited)
- Killers from Space (1954) - Pilot - Tar Baby 2
- The Steel Cage (1954) - Mike, Convict (segment "The Face")
- Ma and Pa Kettle at Waikiki (1955) - Shorty Bates - Kidnapper (uncredited)
- The Adventures of Captain Africa (1955) - Omar
- The Benny Goodman Story (1956) - Sammy - Primo's 1st Henchman (uncredited)
- Hidden Guns (1956) - Ben Peabody
- Hollywood or Bust (1956) - Boss (uncredited)
- Spook Chasers (1957) - Ziggie
- Night Passage (1957) - Pete (uncredited)
- The Crooked Circle (1957) - Ring Announcer (final film) (uncredited)
