= The Boogie Man Will Get You =

1942 film by Lew Landers

- Directed by: Lew Landers
- Written by: Paul Gangelin (adaptation)
- Screenplay by: Edwin Blum
- Story by: Hal Fimberg; Robert B. Hunt
- Produced by: Colbert Clark
- Starring: Boris Karloff; Peter Lorre
- Cinematography: Henry Freulich
- Edited by: Richard Fantl
- Color process: Black and white
- Production company: Columbia Pictures
- Distributed by: Columbia Pictures
- Release date: October 22, 1942
- Running time: 67 minutes
- Country: United States
- Language: English

The Boogie Man Will Get You is a 1942 American comedy horror film directed by Lew Landers and starring Boris Karloff and Peter Lorre. It was the final film Karloff made under his contract with Columbia Pictures, and it was filmed in the wake of his success in the 1941 Broadway production Arsenic and Old Lace. As he had done several times previously, Karloff played the part of a "mad scientist", Professor Billings, who is using the basement of his inn to conduct experiments using electricity to create a race of superhumans. The inn is bought by a new owner, who is initially unaware of the work Billings is conducting.

== Plot ==
Faced with mortgage debts, Professor Nathaniel Billings sells his 18th-century tavern to Winnie Layden, who plans to turn it into a hotel. Billings stipulates as a condition of sale that he is able to continue working in a laboratory in the basement. His housekeeper Amelia Jones and hired hand Ebenezer also continue to work in the inn. Layden is initially unaware of the nature of Billings's experiments in the basement laboratory: he is attempting to use electricity to create a race of superhumans to help the war effort. Layden's ex-husband Bill is against the sale, but is too late to stop it, and decides to stay on at the inn for a few days.

One night at dinner, the residents hear the sounds of a ghost. Bill suspects that this is part of a plan to scare the new owner away. While investigating, Bill discovers in the basement the dead body of travelling salesman Johnson, an experiment subject who died shortly after the sale. He reports this discovery to the local sheriff Dr. Arthur Lorencz. After making inquiries, Lorencz realises the potential for profit and decides to work with Billings on a subsequent experiment. Their initial plan is to use Bill as a test subject, but this proves unsuccessful, so they turn their attention to Maxie, a visiting powder puff salesman.

Before the experiments can begin, one of the inn's guests is murdered. Billings and Lorencz see the primary suspect as another guest, J. Gilbert Brampton, but the police officers who set out to investigate are intercepted on the way. Maxie scares away an intruder known as "Jo-Jo", who is intending to steal Billings's equipment. Billings and Lorencz decide to begin their experiment on Maxie so that they can use him to stop "Jo-Jo" from blowing up a nearby munitions plant. Meanwhile, Brampton informs Winnie and Bill that he is visiting as a representative of the Historical Society of America, who are interested in buying the inn.

When the police officers eventually arrive, they arrest the housekeeper and Ebenezer for the murders. The dead bodies come back to life, having apparently been in a state of suspended animation. The police officers decide to send the rest of the house's inhabitants to the Idlewild Sanatorium, a local psychiatric institution. However, Lorencz reveals himself to be the chair of the institution's Board of Directors, thereby almost assuring their freedom.

== Cast ==
- Boris Karloff as Prof. Nathaniel Billings
- Peter Lorre as Dr. Arthur Lorencz
- Max Rosenbloom as Maxie – the Powder Puff Salesman
- Larry Parks as Bill Layden
- Miss Jeff Donnell as Winnie Slade

== Production ==
The Boogie Man Will Get You was the final film that Boris Karloff made under his contract with Columbia, and the studio were hoping to build on the success of the Broadway play Arsenic and Old Lace, which Karloff was appearing in at the time. Production of the film took place while the play was on hiatus in summer 1942. There are many similarities between the film and Arsenic and Old Lace, including the presence of eccentric characters and the premise of dead bodies in the basement. As previously with the films he made with Columbia, Karloff was cast in the role of a "mad scientist", as he had been in films such as The Man They Could Not Hang (1939), Before I Hang (1940), The Man with Nine Lives (1940), and The Devil Commands (1941).

The screenplay was written by Edwin Blum in four weeks, based on a story by Hal Fimberg and Robert B. Hunt, adapted by Paul Gangelin. Although the film is a comedy-horror, Blum described the studio's aims as creating a "goose pimple" film; Blum explained that he "was and still [is] incapable of writing a straight horror film". Before filming began, Jack Fier had been named as the producer, but Colbert Clark took over from him.

The set for the laboratory and its exotic scientific equipment initially was to include a visible woman, a clear live-sized plastic figure "with lights denoting various nerve-centers", but this was dropped after the Production Code Administration, which enforced the "no nudity in fact or in silhouette" prohibition of the Motion Picture Production Code, raised questions regarding this transparent unclothed model.

Columbia planned a publicity campaign to promote the film, polling film critics to compile a list of the ten best on-screen villains. The studio assumed that Karloff and Lorre would come high on the list, but the top three were all Disney characters: the witch from Snow White and the Seven Dwarfs, the wolf from Three Little Pigs, and the cat from Pinocchio. The studio consequently abandoned this publicity idea.

== Release and reception ==
The Boogie Man Will Get You was released in October 1942 to a mixed critical reception. A Variety reviewer commented positively on the film, describing it as a "screwball comedy" offering "hearty laughs". According to a reviewer in Kinematograph Weekly, however, the madness of the characters was "a little too studio to promote spontaneous thrills or laughter". Writing in the New York Daily News, Kate Cameron stated that "frightening people in theatres takes more ingenuity and adroitness than the authors of this screenplay put into it". The Monthly Film Bulletin found the film was "ably produced and directed" and that Karloff and Lorre "manage to sustain the appearance of mental unbalance well" while stating that the film was "a lot of nonsense with a certain amount of humor, but rather too long-drawn-out."

== Notes ==
Citations

Bibliography

- Buehrer, Beverly Bare (1993). Boris Karloff: A Bio-Bibliography. Greenwood Publishing Group. ISBN 978-0-313-27715-3.
- Hallenbeck, Bruce G. (2009). Comedy-Horror Films: A Chronological History, 1914–2008. McFarland. pp. 38–39. ISBN 978-0-7864-3332-2.
- Mank, Gregory William (2009). Bela Lugosi and Boris Karloff: The Expanded Story of a Haunting Collaboration, With a Complete Filmography of Their Films Together. McFarland. ISBN 978-0-7864-3480-0.
- Pitts, Michael R. (2010). Columbia Pictures: Horror, Science Fiction and Fantasy Films, 1928–1982. McFarland. ISBN 978-0-7864-4447-2.
- Youngkin, Stephen D. (2005). The Lost One: A Life of Peter Lorre. University Press of Kentucky. ISBN 978-0-8131-2360-8.
