= Charles Trowbridge =

American actor (1882–1958)

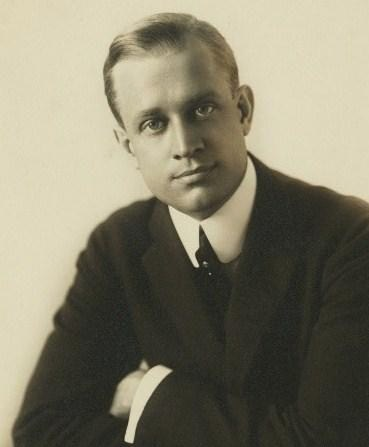
- Trowbridge in 1920
- Born: Charles Silas Richard Trowbridge; January 10, 1882; Veracruz, Mexico
- Died: April 30, 1967 (aged 85); Los Angeles, California, U.S.
- Years active: 1915–1958
- Relatives: John Townsend Trowbridge

Charles Silas Richard Trowbridge (January 10, 1882 – October 30, 1967) was an American film actor. He appeared in more than 230 films from 1915 to 1958 principally playing patrician authority figures.

== Biography ==
Trowbridge was born in Veracruz, Mexico, where his father served in the diplomatic corps of the United States and his grandfather was the American consul-general. He was the older brother of character actor Jack Rockwell, and a cousin of 19th century author John Townsend Trowbridge.

Trowbridge ran a coffee plantation in Hawaii and worked in architecture before venturing into acting.

In 1920, Trowbridge — with several Broadway credits — got his first credits as a Leading Man as part of Elitch Theatre's summer stock cast.

Trowbridge's Broadway credits include Dinner at Eight (1932), Ladies of Creation (1931), Congai (1928), The Behavior of Mrs. Crane (1927), We Never Learn (1927), Craig's Wife (1925), It All Depends (1925), The Backslapper (1924), The Locked Door (1924), Sweet Seventeen (1923), The Lullaby (1923), The Last Warning (1922), The Night Call (1921), Just Because (1921), The Broken Wing (1920), Why Worry? (1918), This Way Out (1917), Come Out of the Kitchen (1916) and Daddy Long Legs (1914).

Trowbridge made a career in Hollywood playing governors, generals, admirals, lawyers, bankers, commissioners, deans, ambassadors, senators, rectors, and other authority figures.

== Death ==
On October 30, 1967, Trowbridge died at age 85 in Los Angeles, California.

== Filmography ==
Year	Film	Role	Director	Notes
1915	The Fight	Joe Keeler		
1915	Prohibition	Richard 'Dick' Larkin		
1915	Sunday	Jacky	George W. Lederer	
1915	The Siren's Song	John Wayne/John Gray		
1917	Thais	Nicias		
1919	The Eternal Magdalene	Paul Bradshaw		
1920	The Fortune Hunter	Harry Kellogg	Tom Terriss	
1922	Island Wives	Jimmy	Webster Campbell	
1931	Damaged Love	Ned Indicott		
1931	Honor Among Lovers	Cunningham, Craig's Attorney	Dorothy Arzner	uncredited
1931	I Take This Woman	Mr. Dowling	Marion Gering	
1931	The Secret Call	Phil Roberts		
1931	Silence	Mallory	Max Marcin	
1935	Calm Yourself	Mr. Lansell	George B. Seitz	
1935	The Murder Man	District Attorney	Tim Whelan	uncredited
1935	Mad Love	Dr. Marbeau	Karl Freund	uncredited
1935	Woman Wanted	Assistant District Attorney	George B. Seitz	uncredited
1935	I Live My Life	Minister at Wedding	W. S. Van Dyke	uncredited
1935	It's in the Air	Alfred Drake	Charles Reisner	
1935	Rendezvous	Secretary of War Baker	William K. Howard; Sam Wood (uncredited)	
1935	Whipsaw	Doctor Treating Ross	Sam Wood	uncredited
1935	Last of the Pagans	Mine Superintendent	Richard Thorpe	uncredited
1936	The Garden Murder Case	Inspector Colby	Edwin L. Marin	
1936	Exclusive Story	James Witherspoon Sr.	George B. Seitz	
1936	Wife vs. Secretary	Hal Harrington	Clarence Brown	uncredited
1936	The Robin Hood of El Dorado	Ramon de la Cuesta	William A. Wellman	
1936	The Great Ziegfeld	Julian Mitchell	Robert Z. Leonard	uncredited
1936	Moonlight Murder	Stage Manager	Edwin L. Marin	
1936	Absolute Quiet	Doctor	George B. Seitz	uncredited
1936	Speed	Doctor Attending Gadget	Edwin L. Marin	uncredited
1936	We Went to College	President Tomlin	Joseph Santley	
1936	The Gorgeous Hussy	Martin Van Buren	Clarence Brown	
1936	The Devil Is a Sissy	Doctor	Rowland Brown	uncredited
1936	Libeled Lady	Graham	Jack Conway	
1936	Mad Holiday	Ship's Doctor	George B. Seitz	uncredited
1936	Love on the Run	Paris Bureau Chief	W.S. Van Dyke	uncredited
1936	Born to Dance	Model Home Spokesman	Roy Del Ruth	uncredited
1936	Sinner Take All	Coroner	Errol Taggart	uncredited
1936	After the Thin Man	Ballistics Man	W. S. Van Dyke	uncredited
1937	Dangerous Number	Hotel Manager	Richard Thorpe	
1937	Man of the People	Man at Hearing	Edwin L. Marin	uncredited
1937	Mama Steps Out	American Consul	George B. Seitz	uncredited
1937	Espionage	Doyle	Kurt Neumann	
1937	They Gave Him a Gun	Judge	W. S. Van Dyke	
1937	The Thirteenth Chair	Dr. Mason	George B. Seitz	
1937	Captains Courageous	Dr. Dick Walsh	Victor Fleming	uncredited
1937	A Day at the Races	Dr. Wilmerding	Sam Wood	uncredited
1937	Reported Missing	H. M. Hastings	Milton Carruth	uncredited
1937	Sea Racketeers	Maxwell Gordon	Hamilton MacFadden	
1937	That Certain Woman	Dr. James	Edmund Goulding	
1937	Fit for a King	Mr. Marshall	Edward Sedgwick	
1937	Saturday's Heroes	President Horace C. Mitchell	Edward Killy	
1937	Alcatraz Island	Warden Jackson	William C. McGann	
1937	That's My Story	B.L. Martin	Sidney Salkow	
1937	Exiled to Shanghai	Walters	Armand Schaefer	
1938	The Buccaneer	Daniel Carroll	Cecil B. DeMille	uncredited
1938	City Girl	Pierson	Alfred L. Werker	uncredited
1938	The Patient in Room 18	Dr. Balman	Crane Wilbur	
1938	The Invisible Menace	Dr. Brooks	John Farrow	
1938	Of Human Hearts	Doctor Attending Capt. Griggs	Clarence Brown	uncredited
1938	No Time to Marry	Winthrop Lawyer	Harry Lachman	
1938	College Swing	Dr. Ashburn	Raoul Walsh	uncredited
1938	Crime School	Judge Clinton	Lewis Seiler	
1938	Gangs of New York	District Attorney Lucas	James Cruze	
1938	Crime Ring	Marvin	Leslie Goodwins	
1938	Racket Busters	Martin's Trial	Lloyd Bacon	uncredited
1938	Men with Wings	Alcott	William A. Wellman	uncredited
1938	Little Tough Guy	Judge Thomas Knott	Harold Young	uncredited
1938	Four's a Crowd	Dr. Ives	Michael Curtiz	uncredited
1938	Smashing the Rackets	Grand Juryman	Lew Landers	uncredited
1938	The Mad Miss Manton		Leigh Jason	uncredited
1938	The Last Express	District Attorney Meredith	Otis Garrett	
1938	Submarine Patrol	Rear Admiral Joseph Maitland	John Ford	
1938	Gang Bullets	Dexter Wayne	Lambert Hillyer	
1938	Nancy Drew... Detective	Hollister	William Clemens	
1938	Angels with Dirty Faces	Norton J. White	Michael Curtiz	uncredited
1938	Thanks for Everything	Draft Doctor		
1938	Kentucky	Doctor	David Butler	
1939	Homicide Bureau	Committee Spokesman	Charles C. Coleman	uncredited
1939	Pacific Liner	San Francisco Doctor	Lew Landers	scenes deleted
1939	King of the Underworld	Dr. Ryan	Lewis Seiler	
1939	Risky Business	Henry Jameson	Arthur Lubin	
1939	Pride of the Navy	Capt. Tyler	Charles Lamont	
1939	Boy Trouble	Mr. Tatum	George Archainbaud	
1939	Cafe Society	Mr. Tiller, the Lawyer	Edward H. Griffith	uncredited
1939	King of Chinatown	Dr. Jones	Nick Grinde	
1939	Sergeant Madden	Commissioner in 1919	Josef von Sternberg	
1939	Let Us Live	Trial Judge	John Brahm	uncredited
1939	On Trial	Henry Dean	Terry O. Morse	
1939	The Story of Alexander Graham Bell	George Pollard	Irving Cummings	
1939	The Lady's from Kentucky	Charles Butler	Alexander Hall	uncredited
1939	Confessions of a Nazi Spy	Maj. Williams	Anatole Litvak	uncredited
1939	Undercover Doctor	Lt. Watson	Louis King	
1939	Grand Jury Secrets	Mr. Halliday	James P. Hogan	uncredited
1939	Waterfront	Judge H. Franklin Scott	Terry O. Morse	uncredited
1939	Each Dawn I Die	Judge	William Keighley	
1939	Mutiny on the Blackhawk	Gen. Fremont	Christy Cabanne	
1939	Hotel for Women	Foley	Gregory Ratoff	uncredited
1939	Lady of the Tropics	Alfred Z. Harrison	Jack Conway	
1939	The Man They Could Not Hang	Judge Bowman		
1939	The Angels Wash Their Faces	Reform School Superintendent	Ray Enright	uncredited
1939	Tropic Fury	Dr. Taylor	Christy Cabanne	
1939	Full Confession	First Doctor	John Farrow	uncredited
1939	Smashing the Money Ring	Judge B.A. Royer	Terry O. Morse	uncredited
1939	Disputed Passage	Dean	Frank Borzage	
1939	Joe and Ethel Turp Call on the President	Cabinet Member	Robert B. Sinclair	
1939	Swanee River	Mr. Foster	Sidney Lanfield	
1940	The Man Who Wouldn't Talk	Judge	David Burton	uncredited
1940	The Fatal Hour	John T. Forbes	William Nigh	
1940	I Take This Woman	Dr. Morris		uncredited
1940	The House of the Seven Gables	Judge	Joe May	
1940	Johnny Apollo	Judge	Henry Hathaway	
1940	Virginia City	Aide to Jefferson Davis	Michael Curtiz	uncredited
1940	The Man with Nine Lives	Dr. Harvey	Nick Grinde	
1940	Edison, the Man	Clark	Clarence Brown	uncredited
1940	Our Town	Dr. Ferguson	Sam Wood	
1940	Sailor's Lady	Aide	Allan Dwan	uncredited
1940	Andy Hardy Meets Debutante	Davis, Fowler's Butler	George B. Seitz	uncredited
1940	My Love Came Back	Dr. Downey	Curtis Bernhardt	
1940	Dr. Kildare Goes Home	Atkinson	Harold S. Bucquet	
1940	Charlie Chan at the Wax Museum	Judge	Lynn Shores	uncredited
1940	Before I Hang	Judge Braden	Nick Grinde (ad Nick Grindé)	uncredited
1940	The Mummy's Hand	Dr. Petrie	Christy Cabanne	
1940	Knute Rockne All American	Professor	Lloyd Bacon; William K. Howard (uncredited)	uncredited
1940	Cherokee Strip	Sen. Cross	Lesley Selander	
1940	Life with Henry	Executive Assistant	Theodore Reed	uncredited
1940	The Son of Monte Cristo	Priest	Rowland V. Lee	
1940	Trail of the Vigilantes	John Thornton		
1940	Mysterious Doctor Satan	Gov. Bronson		Serial, Ch. 1
1940	This Thing Called Love	Bit Part	Alexander Hall	uncredited
1941	Four Mothers	Festival Committee Member	William Keighley	uncredited
1941	Let's Make Music	Doctor	Leslie Goodwins	uncredited
1941	Back Street	Ship Capt. Anderson	Robert Stevenson	uncredited
1941	The Great Mr. Nobody	Grover Dillon	Benjamin Stoloff	
1941	Tobacco Road	Rector	John Ford	scenes deleted
1941	Meet John Doe		Frank Capra	
1941	The Great Lie	Senator Ted Greenfield	Edmund Goulding	
1941	Strange Alibi	Governor Phelps	D. Ross Lederman	
1941	Too Many Blondes	John V. Burton	Thornton Freeland	uncredited
1941	The Nurse's Secret	Arthur Glenn	Noel M. Smith	
1941	They Met in Bombay	British Medical Major	Clarence Brown	uncredited
1941	Sergeant York	Cordell Hull	Howard Hawks	
1941	Hurricane Smith	Mark Harris	Bernard Vorhaus	
1941	Rags to Riches	Prosecutor	Joseph Kane	
1941	Dressed to Kill	David Earle	Eugene J. Forde	
1941	Belle Starr	Colonel Bright	Irving Cummings	
1941	We Go Fast	Defense Attorney	William C. McGann	
1941	King of the Texas Rangers	Robert Crawford [Chs. 2as6,10,12]	John English	Serial
1941	Great Guns	Col. Ridley	Monty Banks	
1941	Cadet Girl	Col. Bradley	Ray McCarey	
1941	Design for Scandal	Northcott's Aide	Norman Taurog	uncredited
1942	Blue, White and Perfect	Capt. Brown	Herbert I. Leeds	
1942	Sex Hygiene	Medical officer	Otto Brower (medical footage); John Ford (dramatic sequences)	Short
1942	Who Is Hope Schuyler?	Judge Rossiter		
1942	Sweetheart of the Fleet	Cmdr. Hawes		
1942	Meet the Stewarts	Mr. Martin, Country Club Lunch Guest	Alfred E. Green	uncredited
1942	Ten Gentlemen from West Point	George Clinton	Henry Hathaway	vice president
1942	The Magnificent Dope	Examining Doctor	Walter Lang	uncredited
1942	Wake Island	George Nielson	John Farrow	uncredited
1942	That Other Woman	Linkletter	Ray McCarey	
1942	Over My Dead Body	Honest Tom Mardley	Malcolm St. Clair	
1942	Tennessee Johnson	Lansbury	William Dieterle	
1943	The Amazing Mrs. Holliday	Immigration Officer	Bruce Manning	uncredited
1943	Mission to Moscow	Secretary of State Cordell Hull	Michael Curtiz	uncredited
1943	Action in the North Atlantic	Rear Adm. Hartridge	Lloyd Bacon	uncredited
1943	The Falcon in Danger	Palmer's Doctor		uncredited
1943	Salute to the Marines	Mr. Selkirk	S. Sylvan Simon	uncredited
1943	Adventures of the Flying Cadets	Maj. William Elliott	Ray Taylor	Serial, Ch. 1
1943	Sweet Rosie O'Grady	Husband	Irving Cummings	scenes deleted
1943	She's for Me	Dr. Folsom		
1943	Madame Curie	Board Member	Mervyn LeRoy	uncredited
1944	The Fighting Seabees	Randolph	Edward Ludwig	uncredited
1944	Captain America	Dryden	John English	Serial
1944	Hey, Rookie	General Willis	Charles Barton	
1944	The Story of Dr. Wassell	Captain of the 'Surabaya'	Cecil B. DeMille	uncredited
1944	Summer Storm	Doctor	Douglas Sirk	
1944	Wing and a Prayer	Cmdr. L.M. Hale, Medical Officer	Henry Hathaway	uncredited
1944	Heavenly Days	Alvin Clark	Howard Estabrook	uncredited
1944	Faces in the Fog	Mr. White	John English	
1945	Youth for the Kingdom	Mr. Webber		
1945	Keep Your Powder Dry			
1945	Within These Walls	Gov. Edward Rice	H. Bruce Humberstone	uncredited
1945	Mildred Pierce	Mrs. Forrester's lawyer	Michael Curtiz	uncredited
1945	They Were Expendable	Admiral Blackwell	John Ford	
1945	The Red Dragon	Prentiss	Phil Rosen	
1946	Shock	Dr. H.J. Harvey	Alfred L. Werker	
1946	Colonel Effingham's Raid	Bank President	Irving Pichel	uncredited
1946	Smooth as Silk	Fletcher Holliday	Charles Barton	
1946	The Hoodlum Saint	Uncle Joe Lorrison	Norman Taurog	
1946	Valley of the Zombies	Dr. Rufus Maynard	Philip Ford	
1946	Don't Gamble with Strangers	Warren Creighton	William Beaudine	
1946	The Secret of the Whistler	Dr. Winthrop	George Sherman	uncredited
1946	Undercurrent	Justice Putnam	Vincente Minnelli	
1946	Gallant Bess	Mr, Riley, Glen Cove Stud Farm	Andrew Marton	uncredited
1947	The Beginning or the End	Walter S. Carpenter Jr.	Norman Taurog	
1947	Mr. District Attorney	Longfield	Robert B. Sinclair	uncredited
1947	The Michigan Kid	Banker John Nash	Ray Taylor	
1947	The Sea of Grass	George Cameron	Elia Kazan	
1947	Shoot to Kill	John Forsythe	William Berke	
1947	Buck Privates Come Home	Mr. Quince	Charles Barton	
1947	Tarzan and the Huntress	King Farrod	Kurt Neumann	
1947	The Private Affairs of Bel Ami	Lawyer	Albert Lewin	uncredited
1947	Honeymoon	Judge Riberol	William Keighley	uncredited
1947	The Secret Life of Walter Mitty	Dr. Renshaw	Norman Z. McLeod	uncredited
1947	Black Gold	Judge Wilson	Phil Karlson	
1947	Key Witness	John Ballin	D. Ross Lederman	
1947	Her Husband's Affairs	Attorney Brewster	S. Sylvan Simon	uncredited
1947	Tycoon	Señor Tobar	Richard Wallace	
1948	Song of My Heart	Jurgensen	Benjamin Glazer	
1948	Stage Struck	Police Capt. Webb	William Nigh	
1948	Hollow Triumph	Deputy	Steve Sekely	
1948	For the Love of Mary	Deputy Commissioner	Frederick de Cordova	uncredited
1948	The Paleface	Gov. Johnson	Norman Z. McLeod	
1949	The Sun Comes Up	Dr. Gage	Richard Thorpe	uncredited
1949	Bad Boy	Dr. Fletcher	Kurt Neumann	uncredited
1949	The Fountainhead	Director	King Vidor	uncredited
1949	Mr. Soft Touch	Judge Fuller	Henry Levin	uncredited
1950	Unmasked	Dr. Lowell	George Blair	
1950	When Willie Comes Marching Home	Gen. Merrill	John Ford	uncredited
1950	A Woman of Distinction	Jewelry Salesman	Edward Buzzell	uncredited
1950	Peggy	Dean William Stockwell	Frederick De Cordova	
1951	The Texas Rangers	Texas Governor	Phil Karlson	uncredited
1952	The Bushwackers	Justin Stone	Rod Amateau	
1952	Hoodlum Empire	Commissioner Garrison	Joseph Kane	uncredited
1957	The Wings of Eagles	Adm. Crown	John Ford	uncredited
1958	The Last Hurrah	Plymouth Club Member at Front Door	John Ford	uncredited
