= Mr. Dynamite =

Mr. Dynamite may refer to:

== Film and television ==
- Mister Dynamite, a 1935 American action film
- Mr. Dynamite (film), a 1941 American crime film
- Mr. Dynamite, a 1947 Bollywood film
- Mr. Dynamite: The Rise of James Brown, a 2014 HBO documentary directed by Alex Gibney

== Music ==
- "Mr. Dynamite", a nickname of American singer James Brown
- Mr. Dynamite, a 1963 album by Swedish singer Jerry Williams
- "Mr. Dynamite", a song by Iggy Pop from the 1980 album Soldier
- "Mr. Dynamite", a 1999 song by Japanese singer Zeebra

== See also ==
- Ms. Dynamite (born 1981), English hip hop and R&B recording artist
