= June Travis =

American actress (1914–2008)

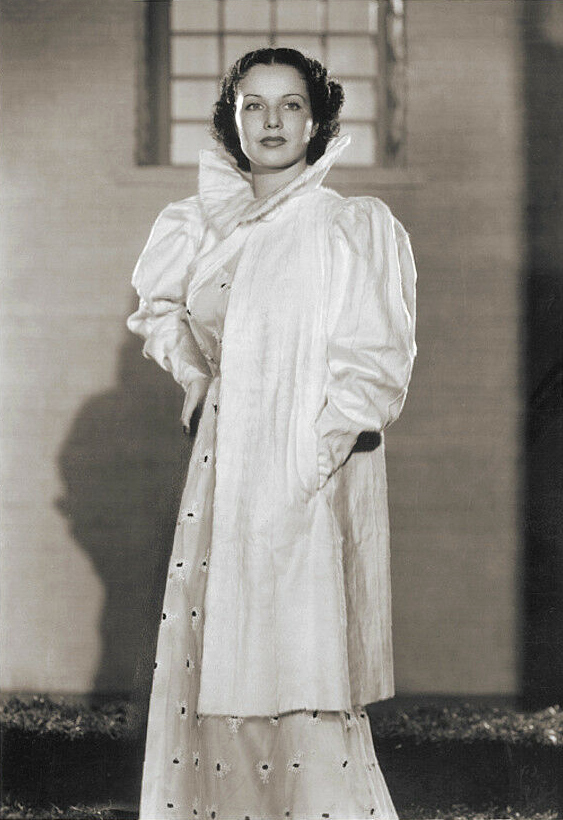
- Travis in 1935
- Born: June Dorothea Grabiner; August 7, 1914; Chicago, Illinois, U.S.
- Died: April 14, 2008 (aged 93); Chicago, Illinois, U.S.
- Resting place: Oak Woods Cemetery, Chicago
- Other name: June Travis Friedlob
- Years active: 1935–1965
- Spouse: Fred Friedlob (m. 1940; died 1979)
- Children: 2

June Travis (born June Dorothea Grabiner; August 7, 1914 – April 14, 2008) was an American film actress.

== Background ==
Born June Dorothea Grabiner, she was the daughter of Harry Grabiner, vice-president of the Chicago White Sox in the 1930s.

She had dark brown hair and green eyes. She stood 5'4" tall. She attended Parkside Grammar School in Chicago and the Starrett School for Girls. She later studied at UCLA. When she returned to Illinois, she matriculated at the University of Chicago.

== Screen actress ==
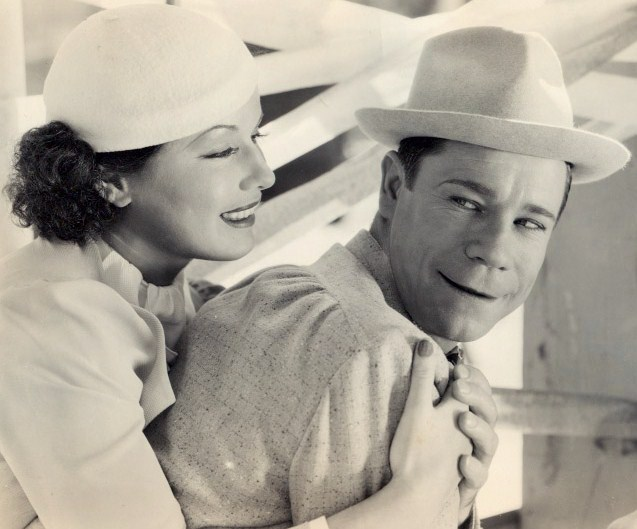
With comedian Joe E. Brown in Earthworm Tractors (1936)

A Paramount Pictures vice-president noticed her in Miami, Florida, at a White Sox exhibition game. He offered Travis a screen test when she came to Pasadena, California, where the major league baseball team trained. The first time she was presented with a screen contract, she suffered from screen fright and turned it down. She returned to Chicago and school and the next winter, accepted a film studio offer in Palm Springs, California.

Travis made her screen debut in Stranded (1935), a film which starred Kay Francis and George Brent. She played the role of Mary Rand. She followed this with a part in Not On Your Life (1935), with Warren William and Claire Dodd. Howard Hawks directed her in Ceiling Zero (1936), a Warner Bros. feature. In preparation for her role, Travis learned flying, navigation, and parachute jumping from Amelia Earhart. The aviator gave her instructions in September 1935, including the film stars James Cagney and Pat O'Brien. Also in 1936, she portrayed secretary Della Street to Perry Mason as played by Ricardo Cortez in The Case of the Black Cat.

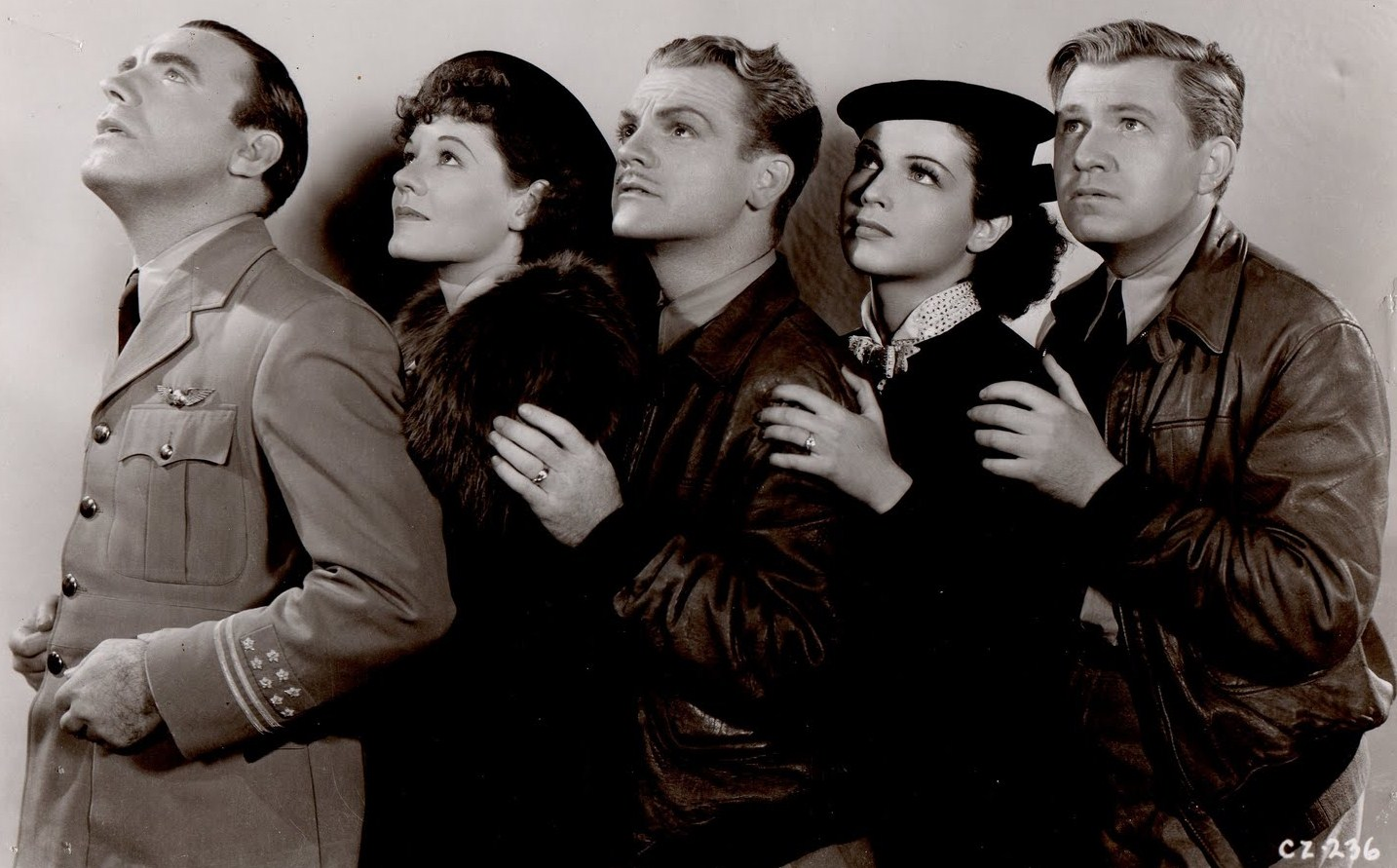
Travis (second from right) with Pat O'Brien, Martha Tibbetts, James Cagney and Stuart Erwin in Ceiling Zero (1936)

She was Ronald Reagan's leading lady in his first movie, Love Is on the Air, in 1937.

Travis became known as the Queen of the B-movies on the Warner Bros. lot. Later, she said that if she had remained in Hollywood two more years, she would have been a star. However, following three years, she came home to Chicago for Christmas with her parents and did not return to making motion pictures afterward. Although Travis stopped regularly appearing in films after 1938, she made minor appearances in The Star (1952) and Monster a Go-Go (1965).

== Radio ==
Travis played Stormy Wilson Curtis in the radio soap opera Girl Alone and Bernice in Arnold Grimm's Daughter, another soap opera.

== Marriage ==
On January 3, 1940, Travis married Fred Friedlob. They had two daughters, Cathy and June. Friedlob died in May 1979 in Chicago.

== Death ==
On April 14, 2008, Travis, age 93, died in a hospital of complications from a stroke she suffered weeks earlier. She is buried in Chicago's Oak Woods Cemetery.

== Filmography ==
- Stranded (1935) (with Kay Francis and George Brent) – Mary Rand
- Don't Bet on Blondes (1935) (with Warren William and Guy Kibbee) – Telephone Operator (uncredited)
- Bright Lights (1935) (with Joe E. Brown) – Party Guest (uncredited)
- Broadway Gondolier (1935) (with Dick Powell and Joan Blondell) – Hatcheck Girl (uncredited)
- The Case of the Lucky Legs (1935) (with Warren William and Genevieve Tobin) – George's Lady Friend (uncredited)
- Shipmates Forever (1935) (with Dick Powell and Ruby Keeler) – Cigarette Girl (uncredited)
- Dr. Socrates (1935) (with Paul Muni) – Dublin
- Broadway Hostess (1935) – Mrs. Bannister (uncredited)
- Ceiling Zero (1936) (with James Cagney) – Tommy Thomas
- Times Square Playboy (1936) (with Warren William) – Beth Calhoun, aka Fay Melody
- Earthworm Tractors (1936) (with Joe E. Brown) – Mabel Johnson
- Bengal Tiger (1936) (with Barton MacLane) – Laura Homan Ballenger
- Jailbreak (1936) (with Barton Maclane and Craig Reynolds) – Jane Rogers
- The Big Game (1936) (with Philip Huston and James Gleason) – Margaret Anthony
- The Case of the Black Cat (1936) (with Ricardo Cortez) – Della Street
- Join the Marines (1937) (with Paul Kelly) – Paula Denbrough
- Circus Girl (1937) (with Robert Livingston and Donald Cook) – Kay Rogers
- Men in Exile (1937) (with Dick Purcell) – Sally Haines
- Love Is on the Air (1937) (with Ronald Reagan) – Jo Hopkins
- Over the Goal (1937) (with William Hopper and Johnnie Davis) – Lucille Martin
- Exiled to Shanghai (1937) (with Wallace Ford and Dean Jagger) – Nancy Jones
- The Kid Comes Back (1938) (with Wayne Morris) – Mary Malone
- Over the Wall (1938) (with Dick Foran) – Kay Norton
- Go Chase Yourself (1938) (with Joe Penner and Lucille Ball) – Judy Daniels
- The Marines Are Here (1938) (with Gordon Oliver) – Terry Foster
- The Gladiator (1938) (with Joe E. Brown) – Iris Bennett
- Mr. Doodle Kicks Off (1938) (with Joe Penner) – Janice Martin
- The Night Hawk (1938) (with Robert Livingston) – Della Parrish
- Little Orphan Annie (1938) (with Ann Gillis) – Mary Ellen
- Federal Man-Hunt (1938) (with Robert Livingston) – Anne Lawrence
- The Star (1952) (with Bette Davis) – Phyllis Stone
- Monster A Go-Go (1965) (with Paul Morton) – Ruth (final film role)
