= The Man They Could Not Hang =

1939 American horror film

- Theatrical release poster
- Directed by: Nick Grinde; (as Nick Grindé)
- Screenplay by: Karl Brown
- Story by: Leslie T. White; George Wallace Sayre
- Starring: Boris Karloff; Lorna Gray; Robert Wilcox; Roger Pryor; Don Beddoe; Ann Doran
- Cinematography: Benjamin H. Kline; (as Benjamin Kline)
- Edited by: William A. Lyon; (as William Lyon)
- Production company: Columbia Pictures
- Distributed by: Columbia Pictures
- Release date: August 17, 1939
- Running time: 64 minutes
- Country: United States
- Language: English

The Man They Could Not Hang is a 1939 American horror film directed by Nick Grinde from a screenplay by Karl Brown. It stars Boris Karloff as Dr. Henryk Savaard, a scientist who develops a procedure for bringing the dead back to life. When he is arrested and sentenced to be executed for murdering a young medical student who volunteered to be killed to test the procedure, Savaard vows retribution on the individuals responsible. Alongside Karloff, the film's cast includes Lorna Gray, Robert Wilcox, and Roger Pryor.

The Man They Could Not Hang is the first in a series of four similarly themed but otherwise unrelated horror films produced by Columbia Pictures, all starring Karloff, informally known as the "Mad Doctor Cycle." It was followed by The Man with Nine Lives, Before I Hang (both 1940), and The Devil Commands (1941). A fifth, The Boogie Man Will Get You (1942), was a parody of the others.

== Plot ==
Dr. Henryk Savaard is a scientist experimenting with bringing the dead back to life in a laboratory in his home. Bob Roberts, a young medical student, volunteers himself to be temporarily killed in order to test an artificial heart developed by Savaard. If successful, Savaard's invention could allow doctors to perform procedures that would otherwise be impossible to conduct on living patients. Bob's fiancée, Ms. Crawford, fears that the experiment will fail, and rushes to a police department to alert law enforcement. When the police enter Savaard's house, Savaard instructs his assistant, Lang, to take the artificial heart and hide. Despite his assertions that he can restore Bob's life, the police arrest Savaard for murder.

After a publicized trial, a jury declares Savaard guilty of first-degree murder, and he is sentenced to hang. Following the announcement of the verdict, the presiding Judge Bowman allows Savaard two minutes to speak, which Savaard uses to condemn those responsible for his conviction. On death row, Savaard is visited by Lang, and signs a release form that will allow Lang to take possession of his body after he is executed. Shortly thereafter, Savaard is hanged.

Some time later, Savaard is revived by Lang. Though he sustained a broken neck from the hanging, Lang was able to surgically repair it, an effort that Lang notes would have been unfeasible had Savaard been alive. Over the month following Savaard's execution, six of the jurors from his trial are found hanged in apparent suicides, a commonality noticed by reporter 'Scoop' Foley. Foley visits Savaard's house on a night when the surviving jurors—along with District Attorney Drake, Police Lieutenant Shane, and police surgeon Dr. Stoddard—have been asked to gather there, having been sent messages attributed to Judge Bowman. When Bowman arrives, he reveals that he received a telegram supposedly signed by Savaard's daughter Janet asking him to meet her there.

As the guests attempt to deduce who summoned them to the location, Savaard enters the room. Inviting them to stay for dinner, he explains to his guests, who are stunned to see him alive, that he could kill all of them and be protected by the alibi of his being legally dead. Judge Bowman tries to leave the house but is fatally electrocuted when he attempts to open a grille separating the guests from the house's front doors. Savaard disappears, and the remaining guests realize that they are trapped in the house.

Over an intercom, Savaard announces that each of them will be killed at fifteen-minute intervals. Kearney, the head juror, is killed when he answers a phone that thrusts a poison-tipped needle into his ear, piercing his brain. Savaard states that Ms. Crawford is next to die. Janet arrives at the house, and the trapped guests explain to her that her father is alive. Janet finds Savaard upstairs in his laboratory, and implores him to abandon his desire for revenge. Savaard reveals that he killed Lang after Lang threatened to expose his plan to kill those responsible for convicting him. Janet heads downstairs and, in spite of her father's pleas, purposefully touches the electrified grille, forcing Savaard to surrender.

Using Savaard's artificial heart apparatus, Dr. Stoddard revives Janet. Savaard, to the dismay of Dr. Stoddard, destroys his invention with a gun, and dies.

== Cast ==
- Boris Karloff as Dr. Henryk Savaard
- Lorna Gray as Janet Savaard
- Robert Wilcox as 'Scoop' Foley
- Roger Pryor as District Attorney Drake
- Don Beddoe as Police Lt. Shane
- Ann Doran as Betty Crawford
- Joe De Stefani as Dr. Stoddard
- Charles Trowbridge as Judge Bowman
- Byron Foulger as Lang
- Dick Curtis as Jury Foreman Clifford Kearney
- James Craig as Juror Watkins
- John Tyrrell as Juror Sutton

Stanley Brown appears in an uncredited role as Bob Roberts.

== Critical reception ==
On review aggregator website Rotten Tomatoes, the film has an approval rating of 71% based on seven reviews, with an average rating of 6.8/10.

== Home media ==
In the 1990s, The Man They Could Not Hang was released on VHS by RCA/Columbia Pictures Home Video. In 2006, the film was included on a four-film DVD release titled "Icons of Horror Collection: Boris Karloff", accompanying The Black Room (1935), Before I Hang (1940), and The Boogie Man Will Get You (1942). In 2021, The Man They Could Not Hang was released on Blu-ray in Region B by Eureka Entertainment, as part of a six-film box set known as "Karloff at Columbia". The other films included in the set are The Black Room, The Man with Nine Lives, Before I Hang, The Devil Commands, and The Boogie Man Will Get You.

== See also ==
- Boris Karloff filmography
