= Eddie Acuff =

American actor (1903–1956)

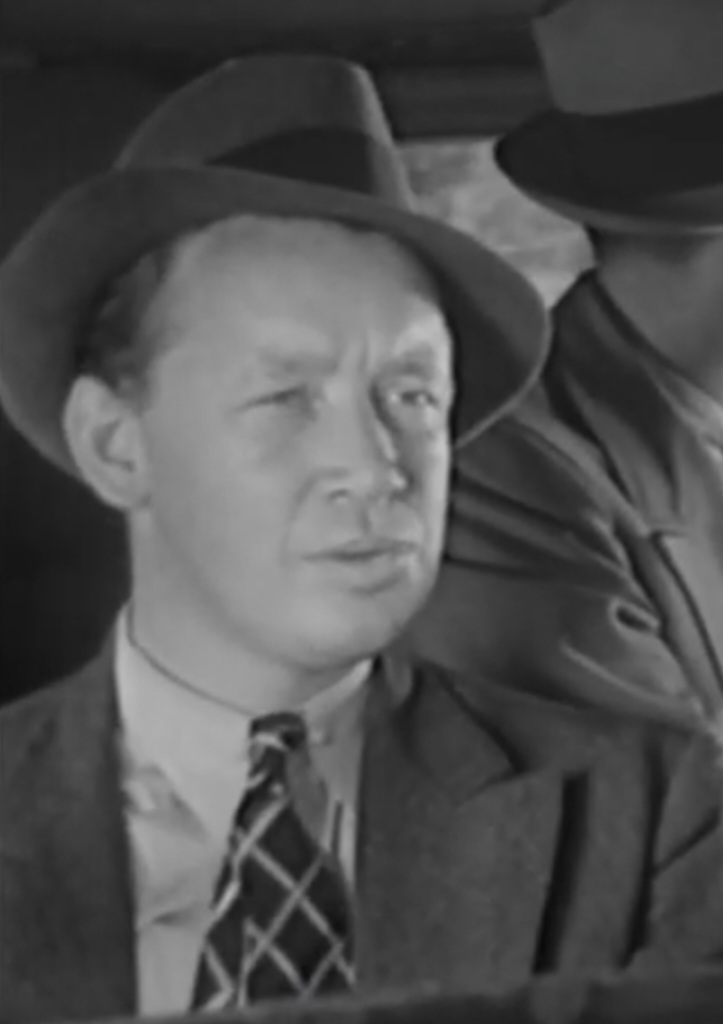
- Acuff in What Price Vengeance (1937)
- Born: Edward DeKalb Acuff; June 3, 1903; Caruthersville, Missouri, U.S.
- Died: December 17, 1956 (aged 53); Hollywood, California, U.S.
- Resting place: Valhalla Memorial Park Cemetery
- Occupation: Actor
- Years active: 1932–1952

Edward DeKalb Acuff (June 3, 1903 – December 17, 1956) was an American stage and film actor. He frequently was cast as a droll comic relief, in the support of the star. His best-known recurring role is that of Mr. Beasley, the postman, in the Blondie movie series that starred Penny Singleton and Arthur Lake.

== Early years ==
Acuff was born in Caruthersville, Missouri. He was the son of DeKalb Acuff (1880-1916) and his wife Grace (later known as Mrs. H. N. Arnold).

== Career ==
Before beginning his Hollywood film career in 1934, Acuff performed in Broadway theatre in the early-1930s. His Broadway credits include Jayhawker (1934), Yellow Jack (1934), John Brown (1934), Growing Pains (1933), Heat Lightning (1933), and The Dark Hours (1932).

In 1935, Warner Bros. signed Acuff to a long-term contract and scheduled him to debut on film in Anchors Aweigh. He had a recurring role as the postman in the Blondie film series. Acuff was seen in three film serials — as Curly in Jungle Girl, as Red Kelly in Daredevils of the West, and as Spud Warner in Chick Carter Detective.

== Death ==
On December 17, 1956, Acuff died of a heart attack in Hollywood, California. He is buried in Valhalla Memorial Park Cemetery.

== Filmography ==
=== Film ===
Year	Title	Role	Notes
1934	Here Comes the Navy	Marine Orderly	Uncredited
1935	Mr. Widget		Short Film; uncredited
1935	Shipmates Forever	Lincoln 'Cowboy'	
1935	I Found Stella Parish	Dimmie	
1935	Miss Pacific Fleet	Clarence 'Dutch'	
1936	The Petrified Forest	Lineman	
1936	The Walking Dead	Betcha	
1936	Boulder Dam	Ed Harper	
1936	Colleen		Uncredited
1936	The Law in Her Hands	Eddie O'Malley	
1936	The Golden Arrow	Davis	
1936	Crash Donovan	Alabam	
1936	Jailbreak	Sig Patton	
1936	The Case of the Velvet Claws	Spudsy Drake	
1936	Yellowstone	Desk Clerk	Uncredited
1936	Laughing at Trouble	Jamie Bradford	Credited as Edward Acuff
1936	Let's Make a Million		Uncredited
1937	Guns of the Pecos	Ranger Jeff Carter	
1937	Black Legion	Metcalf	
1937	The Outer Gate	Todd Shannon	Credited as Edward Acuff
1937	The Go Getter	Bob Blair	
1937	What Price Vengeance	Tex McGirk	
1937	The Singing Marine	Sam	
1937	They Won't Forget	Drugstore Clerk	
1937	Talent Scout	Musselman - Writer	Uncredited
1937	Back in Circulation	Murphy	
1937	Love Is on the Air	'Dunk' Glover	
1937	Missing Witnesses	Detective Pete	Uncredited
1937	She Loved a Fireman	Skillet Michaels	
1937	Hollywood Hotel	Cameraman	
1938	The Invisible Menace	Corporal Sanger	
1938	Law of the Underworld	Bill	
1938	Gangs of New York	Motorist	Uncredited
1938	Ladies in Distress	Horace - First Thug	
1938	Young Fugitives	Loafer	Uncredited
1938	The Chaser	Photographer	Uncredited
1938	Smashing the Rackets	Joe - Hoodlum	Credited as Edward Acuff
1938	Four Daughters	Sam	
1938	Youth Takes a Fling	Bum	
1938	King of Alcatraz	Steward	Uncredited
1938	How to Watch Football	Yelling Fan Next to Benchley	Short Film; uncredited
1938	Rhythm of the Saddle	Dixie Erwin	
1938	The Cowboy and the Lady	Bus Driver	Uncredited
1938	His Exciting Night	Reporter	Uncredited
1938	Next Time I Marry	Gas Station Attendant	Uncredited
1938	Road Demon	Smitty	Uncredited
1938	Ride a Crooked Mile	Airplane Pilot	Uncredited
1939	Fighting Thoroughbreds		Uncredited
1939	The Phantom Creeps	Mac - AMI Agent	
1939	The Mysterious Miss X	Pete - Policeman	
1939	Ambush	Bus Conductor	Uncredited
1939	Wings of the Navy	Reporter	Uncredited
1939	Persons in Hiding	Collins	Uncredited
1939	High Peril		Short Film
1939	Society Smugglers	Radio Technician	
1939	Blondie Meets the Boss	Pots and Pans Peddler	Uncredited
1939	Rough Riders' Round-up	Tommy Ward	
1939	Winner Take All	Second	Uncredited
1939	Blind Alley	State Trooper Stopping Fred	Uncredited
1939	Help Wanted	Workman	Short Film; uncredited
1939	The Cowboy Quarterback	Airplane Pilot	
1939	Miracles for Sale	Second Taxi Driver	Uncredited
1939	When Tomorrow Comes	Second Bus Driver	Uncredited
1939	Flight at Midnight	Stubby - Passenger Plane Pilot	Uncredited
1939	Two Bright Boys	Washburn	
1939	Espionage Agent		Uncredited
1939	Hero for a Day	Eddie Gibbons	Uncredited
1939	On Dress Parade	Fort Lewis Sergeant	Uncredited
1939	The Roaring Twenties	Cabbie	Uncredited
1939	Too Busy to Work	Stage Manager	
1939	Meet Dr. Christian	Benson	
1939	Days of Jesse James	Train Conductor	Uncredited
1939	Lawyer Woman		
1939	Backfire		
1940	Oh, Johnny, How You Can Love!	Motorcycle Cop	Uncredited
1940	Cafe Hostess	Scotty	
1940	Honeymoon Deferred	Cab Driver	Uncredited
1940	Castle on the Hudson	Bill	Uncredited
1940	Charlie Chan in Panama	Sailor	Uncredited
1940	Ma! He's Making Eyes at Me	Counter Man	Uncredited
1940	It's a Date	Ship's Steward	Uncredited
1940	Star Dust	Mike, Dallas Stagehand	Uncredited
1940	Shooting High	Andy Carson	
1940	Enemy Agent	Federal Agent Posing as Drunk	Uncredited
1940	Buck Benny Rides Again	Truck Driver	Uncredited
1940	Flight Angels	Mechanic with Apple	Uncredited
1940	Sailor's Lady	Guide	
1940	Manhattan Heartbeat	First Mechanic	Uncredited
1940	Girls of the Road	Bartley - Bus Driver	Uncredited
1940	They Drive by Night	Driver in Café	Uncredited
1940	The Boys from Syracuse	Taxi Cab Driver	
1940	The Secret Seven	Driver	Uncredited
1940	Money and the Woman	Mr. Jones	Uncredited
1940	Flowing Gold	Shorty Smith	Uncredited
1940	Dr. Kildare Goes Home	Clifford Genet - Orderly	Uncredited
1940	Spring Parade	Earl	Uncredited
1940	So You Won't Talk	Lounger	Uncredited
1940	The Villain Still Pursued Her	Joe	Uncredited
1940	Slightly Tempted	Hartman - Policeman	Uncredited
1940	One Night in the Tropics	First S.S. Atlantica Steward	Uncredited
1940	Gallant Sons	Taxi Driver	Scenes deleted
1940	The Bank Dick	Reporter	Uncredited
1940	Dr. Kildare's Crisis	Clifford Genet - Window Cleaner	Uncredited
1940	The Border Legion	Ticket Agent	Uncredited
1940	Texas Rangers Ride Again	Bud - Ranger Stenographer	Uncredited
1940	The Green Hornet Strikes Again!	Lowery - a Reporter	
1941	Robin Hood of the Pecos	Sam Starr	
1941	Six Lessons from Madame La Zonga	Steward	
1941	High Sierra	Bus Driver	Uncredited
1941	Arkansas Judge	Townsman	Uncredited
1941	Back Street	Andy	Uncredited
1941	Ride, Kelly, Ride	Roy Wall	Uncredited
1941	Blondie Goes Latin	Cab Driver	Uncredited
1941	The Great Train Robbery	Telegrapher	Uncredited
1941	Here Comes Happiness	Bill	
1941	Dutiful But Dumb	Headquarters Guard - Right of Door	Short film; uncredited
1941	Mr. District Attorney	Cabbie	Uncredited
1941	Model Wife	Undetermined Role	Uncredited
1941	The Wagons Roll at Night	Pickpocket Victim	Uncredited
1941	The People vs. Dr. Kildare	Clifford Genet	
1941	The Great American Broadcast	Jimmy	
1941	Broadway Limited	Engineer's Assistant	Uncredited
1941	Jungle Girl	Curly Rogers	
1941	A Very Young Lady	Sheriff Bill Stone	Uncredited
1941	Bad Men of Missouri	Peg Leg	Uncredited
1941	Rags to Riches	Ace	
1941	Dr. Kildare's Wedding Day	Clifford Genet - Orderly	Uncredited
1941	Bad Man of Deadwood	Reporter of Burns' Death	Uncredited
1941	They Died with Their Boots On	Cpl. Smith	Uncredited
1941	Mr. District Attorney in the Carter Case	Hypo	
1941	Hellzapoppin'	Drafted Devil	Uncredited
1942	Fly-by-Night	Garage Attendant	Uncredited
1942	Dr. Kildare's Victory	Clifford Genet	
1942	The Lady Is Willing	Patrolman Murphy	Uncredited
1942	What's Cookin'	Doorman	Uncredited
1942	Sleepytime Gal	First Mug	Uncredited
1942	Sing Your Worries Away	Tour Map Seller	Uncredited
1942	True to the Army	Sgt. Riggs	
1942	Who Is Hope Schuyler?	Arthur Guerney	Uncredited
1942	Mississippi Gambler	Everett - Desk Clerk	
1942	Take a Letter, Darling	Man Who Picks Teeth	Uncredited
1942	In This Our Life	Worker	Uncredited
1942	She's in the Army	Pete	
1942	Private Buckaroo	Waiter Captain	Uncredited
1942	Yankee Doodle Dandy	Reporter	Uncredited
1942	The Postman Didn't Ring	Photographer	Uncredited
1942	Calling Dr. Gillespie	Clifford Genet	
1942	Timber!	Man	Uncredited
1942	Blondie for Victory	Husband Whose Wife Knits Socks	Uncredited
1942	Pardon My Sarong	Wise Guy at Gas Station	Uncredited
1942	The Old Homestead	Policeman	Uncredited
1942	Bells of Capistrano	Mug / Sign-Poster #1	Uncredited
1942	The War Against Mrs. Hadley	Soldier in Canteen	Uncredited
1942	Girl Trouble	Taxi Driver	Uncredited
1942	Youth on Parade	Cop	Uncredited
1942	Army Surgeon	Sergeant	Uncredited
1942	Fall In	Sgt. Topps	Uncredited
1942	Dr. Gillespie's New Assistant	Clifford Genet	
1942	The Traitor Within	Tommy	
1943	Slightly Dangerous	Soda Jerk	Uncredited
1943	He Hired the Boss	Driver	Uncredited
1943	Good Morning, Judge	Cab Driver	Uncredited
1943	Daredevils of the West	Red Kelly	
1943	Pilot #5	Newsreel Cameraman	Uncredited
1943	Hers to Hold	Reporter	Uncredited
1943	Headin' for God's Country	Hugo Higgins	
1943	Guadalcanal Diary	Pvt. Tex McIlvoy	Uncredited
1943	Flesh and Fantasy	Cop	Uncredited
1943	Swingtime Johnny	Worker	Uncredited
1943	Lost Angel	Policeman	Uncredited
1944	Week-End Pass	Waikowsky	
1944	Hat Check Honey	Cameraman	Uncredited
1944	Four Jills in a Jeep	Sentry	Scenes deleted
1944	It Happened Tomorrow	Jim	
1944	Hey, Rookie	Jokester	Uncredited
1944	Andy Hardy's Blonde Trouble	Taxi Driver #1	Uncredited
1944	Once Upon a Time	Shipyard Worker	Uncredited
1944	Silent Partner	Taxicab Driver	Uncredited
1944	South of Dixie	Jay Hatcher	
1944	Christmas Holiday	Steve	Uncredited
1944	Bride by Mistake	Photographer	Uncredited
1944	Wing and a Prayer	Pharmacist's Mate	Uncredited
1944	I Love a Soldier	Private	Uncredited
1944	Rainbow Island	Sailor	Uncredited
1944	In the Meantime, Darling	Milkman	Uncredited
1944	Irish Eyes Are Smiling	Harry	Uncredited
1944	Something for the Boys	Blue Army Radio Operator	Uncredited
1944	Sergeant Mike	Monohan	Uncredited
1944	Carolina Blues	Eddie	Uncredited
1944	Can't Help Singing	Cavalry Officer	Uncredited
1944	Belle of the Yukon	Miner	Uncredited
1945	She Gets Her Man	Boze - Photographer	
1945	Roughly Speaking	Billiards Player	Uncredited
1945	Her Lucky Night	Chauffeur	
1945	Leave It to Blondie	Mailman	Uncredited
1945	Without Love	Taxi Driver	Uncredited
1945	The Clock	First Subway Official	Uncredited
1945	Between Two Women	Orderly	
1945	Brewster's Millions	Cab Driver	Uncredited
1945	Diamond Horseshoe	Clarinet Player	Uncredited
1945	Honeymoon Ahead	Connors	
1945	Wonder Man	Pelican Club Doorman	Uncredited
1945	Flame of Barbary Coast	Fireman	Uncredited
1945	The Frozen Ghost	Reporter in Hallway	Uncredited
1945	Don Juan Quilligan	Customer at Mossrock's	Uncredited
1945	The Jungle Captive	Bill	
1945	On Stage Everybody	George	Uncredited
1945	The Hidden Eye	Whitey	
1945	Shadow of Terror	Joe Walters	
1945	Life with Blondie	Mailman	Uncredited
1945	San Antonio	Gawking Townsman	Uncredited
1946	Meet Me on Broadway	Waiter	Uncredited
1946	The Notorious Lone Wolf	Detective Jones	Uncredited
1946	The Flying Serpent	Jerry 'Jonsey' Jones	
1946	Cinderella Jones	Truck Driver	Uncredited
1946	Renegades	Stagecoach Driver	Uncredited
1946	Blonde Alibi	Ambulance Attendant	Uncredited
1946	Bad Bascomb	Corporal Finch	Uncredited
1946	Inside Job	Jerry	Uncredited
1946	Chick Carter, Detective	Spud Warner	
1946	Danger Woman	Reporter	Uncredited
1946	The Bamboo Blonde	M.P. Sergeant	Uncredited
1946	Three Little Girls in Blue	Josh	Uncredited
1946	Wake Up and Dream	Bus Driver	Uncredited
1946	Gallant Bess	Chief Petty Officer	Uncredited
1946	Heldorado	Carnival Shooting Gallery Attendant	
1946	Lady in the Lake	Ed - Coroner	Uncredited
1947	Blondie's Big Moment	Mailman	Uncredited
1947	The Sea of Grass	Cattleman	Uncredited
1947	Suddenly, It's Spring	Man Retrieving Pajamas	Uncredited
1947	Buck Privates Come Home	Soldier	Uncredited
1947	Blondie's Holiday	Postman	
1947	Bells of San Angelo	Bus Driver	
1947	Swing the Western Way	Mr. Spraggs	
1947	Wyoming	Nester	Uncredited
1947	The Secret Life of Walter Mitty	Wells Fargo Cowboy	Uncredited
1947	Down to Earth	Stage Hand	Uncredited
1947	Exposed	Policeman at Bentry Mansion Door	Uncredited
1947	Black Gold	Colonel Caldwell's Ranch Foreman	Uncredited
1947	Blondie in the Dough	Postman	
1947	The Fabulous Texan	Telegrapher	Uncredited
1947	Roses Are Red	Reporter	Uncredited
1947	Bandits of Dark Canyon	Stage Passenger Faraday	
1947	Blondie's Anniversary	Mailman	Uncredited
1948	Slippy McGee	Charlie	
1948	G-Men Never Forget	'Fiddler' - Used Car Salesman	
1948	Black Bart	Elkins	Uncredited
1948	Song of Idaho	Hash Brown	
1948	Blondie's Reward	Mr. Johnson	
1948	The Timber Trail	Telegraph Operator	
1948	Coroner Creek	Bit	Uncredited
1948	Northwest Stampede	Hamburger Vendor	Uncredited
1948	The Return of October	Stable Boy	Uncredited
1948	Leather Gloves	Duke	
1948	Bungalow 13	José Fernando	
1948	Smoky Mountain Melody	Jenkins	
1948	Blondie's Secret	Mr. Beasley	
1949	Blondie's Big Deal	Mr. Beasley	
1949	Home in San Antone	Postman	Uncredited
1949	Johnny Allegro	Sam	Uncredited
1949	Miss Grant Takes Richmond	Bus Driver	Uncredited
1950	The Milkman	Herman Schultz	Uncredited
1951	Painting the Clouds with Sunshine	Golden Egg Doorman	Uncredited
1952	Stop, You're Killing Me	Cab Driver	Uncredited; final role

=== Television ===
Year	Title	Role	Notes
1950	The Lone Ranger	Sheriff	Episode: "Sheep Thieves"
