= What Price Vengeance =

1937 film by Del Lord

What Price Vengeance?
- Directed by: Del Lord
- Written by: J.P. McGowan (original screenplay)
- Produced by: Kenneth J. Bishop
- Starring: See below
- Cinematography: William Beckway; Harry Forbes
- Edited by: William Austin
- Release date: 1937
- Running time: 61 minutes
- Countries: Canada; United States
- Language: English

What Price Vengeance? is a 1937 American-Canadian crime film directed by Del Lord.

The film is also known as Vengeance.

== Plot ==
A policeman hesitates to use his gun to stop a robbery, and the thieves get away. He is forced to quit the force and turns to a life of crime instead.

== Cast ==
- Lyle Talbot as Tom Connors - posing as "Dynamite" Hogan
- Wendy Barrie as Polly Moore
- Marc Lawrence as Pete Brower
- Eddie Acuff as Tex McGirk
- Lucille Lund as "Babe" Foster
- Robert Rideout as Slim Ryan
- Reginald Hincks as Police Inspector Blair
- Wally Albright as "Sandy" MacNair
- Lois Albright as Mary MacNair
- Arthur Kerr as Officer Bill MacNair
