= King of Chinatown =

- Theatrical release poster
- Directed by: Nick Grinde
- Screenplay by: Lillie Hayward; Irving Reis
- Story by: Herbert Biberman
- Produced by: Harold Hurley
- Starring: Anna May Wong; Akim Tamiroff; J. Carrol Naish; Sidney Toler; Philip Ahn; Anthony Quinn; Bernadene Hayes
- Cinematography: Leo Tover
- Edited by: Eda Warren
- Music by: Gerard Carbonara; John Leipold
- Production company: Paramount Pictures
- Distributed by: Paramount Pictures
- Release dates: March 15, 1939 (New York City); March 17, 1939 (United States)
- Running time: 57 minutes
- Country: United States
- Language: English

King of Chinatown is a 1939 American crime film directed by Nick Grinde and written by Lillie Hayward and Irving Reis. The film stars Anna May Wong, Akim Tamiroff, J. Carrol Naish, Sidney Toler, Philip Ahn, Anthony Quinn and Bernadene Hayes. The film was released on March 17, 1939, by Paramount Pictures.

== Plot ==
Violence and death stalk the Chinese of a big American city, but one man, Dr. Chang Ling, and his daughter, Dr. Mary Ling, defy the racketeers who are responsible, and, against terrific odds, bring peace to their oppressed neighbors.

== Cast ==
- Anna May Wong as Dr. Mary Ling
- Akim Tamiroff as Frank Baturin
- J. Carrol Naish as Professor
- Sidney Toler as Dr. Chang Ling
- Philip Ahn as Robert 'Bob' Li
- Anthony Quinn as Mike Gordon
- Bernadene Hayes as Dolly Warren
- Roscoe Karns as 'Rip' Harrigan
- Ray Mayer as 'Potatoes'
- Richard Denning as Protective Association Henchman
- Archie Twitchell as Hospital Interne
- Eddie Marr as Henchman Bert
- George Anderson as Detective
- Charles B. Wood as Henchman Red
- George Magrill as Second Gangster
- Charles Trowbridge as Dr. Jones
- Lily King as Chinese Woman
- Wong Chung as Chinese Man
- Chester Gan as Mr. Foo
- Pat West as Fight Announcer
- Guy Usher as Investigator
