= Three Dark Horses =

1952 American short film by Jules White

- Directed by: Jules White
- Written by: Felix Adler
- Produced by: Jules White
- Starring: Moe Howard; Larry Fine; Shemp Howard; Kenneth MacDonald; Ben Welden; Bud Jamison
- Cinematography: Henry Freulich
- Edited by: Edwin Bryant
- Distributed by: Columbia Pictures
- Release date: October 16, 1952 (U.S.)
- Running time: 16:35
- Country: United States
- Language: English

Three Dark Horses is a 1952 short subject directed by Jules White starring American slapstick comedy team The Three Stooges (Moe Howard, Larry Fine and Shemp Howard). It is the 142nd entry in the series released by Columbia Pictures starring the comedians, who released 190 shorts for the studio between 1934 and 1959.

== Plot ==
The Stooges transition from janitorial roles to political delegates upon being enlisted to bolster the candidacy of Hammond Egger, a politically dubious figure. Their recruitment follows the departure of the initial three delegates upon discerning Egger's unscrupulous nature. Encountering the hapless Stooges, who inadvertently disrupt proceedings by vacuuming Jim Digger's toupee, Egger's campaign manager, Bill Wick, perceives an opportunity and promptly hires them as replacements, delineating their duties as delegates.

Swiftly discerning Egger's nefarious character, the Stooges divert their support to Abel Lamb Stewer, Egger's political adversary. Wick, upon discovering the Stooges' betrayal, seeks retribution, instigating a confrontation. Ultimately, the trio prevails over Wick and Digger in a tumultuous altercation, emerging victorious by submerging their adversaries in a bathtub.

== Cast ==
=== Credited ===
- Moe Howard as Moe
- Larry Fine as Larry
- Shemp Howard as Shemp
- Kenneth MacDonald as Bill Wick
- Ben Welden as Jim Digger

=== Uncredited ===
- Bud Jamison as Hammond Egger (picture)
- Jules White as voice of TV reporter

== Production notes ==
Although he never appears in the film, a photo of candidate Hammond Egger appears several times in Three Dark Horses. The photo is actually of supporting actor Bud Jamison, who died suddenly in 1944. The inclusion of his photo in the film was done as tribute to the actor, whose talents were missed during the post-Curly Howard era. This is the sixteenth and final Stooge short with the word "three" in the title.

Hammond Egger is a pun on "ham and egger", nickname for a supporter of the Ham and Eggs Movement in California during the Great Depression. This was a simplistic share-our-wealth movement inspired by the then recently deceased Huey Long. The implication is that Hammond Egger supporters will be ordinary people who are not very bright, as well as looking for a handout. It was also a slang term for someone working a menial job, the implication being that ham and eggs (a relatively cheap dish) would be the only substantial thing he could afford to eat. (Before the ham-and-eggs movement, the Stooges used a ham and eggs gag in A Pain in the Pullman (1936). They called a boarding house owner "Mrs. Hammond Eggerly", implying that the board (food) supplied at her place would be cheap eats for laborers.)

The Stooges had also done a "ham and eggs" gag earlier in You Nazty Spy! (1940), this time with a specific reference to the movement. Hitleresque dictator Moe Hailstone is whipping up a mob with demagogic promises, including "Every Thursday you will receive...ham-burger and eggs!" (A slogan of the ham-and-eggs movement had been "$30 every Thursday".) An extra gag here is that changing "ham and eggs" to "hamburger and eggs" makes the dish kosher, probably not something on Hailstone’s mind at all.

A generation later, wrestling announcer Bobby Heenan would refer to dim fans and untalented wrestlers as "ham-and-eggers".

Three Dark Horses was filmed from 26–28 August 1952. It was released on 16 October 1952, just 19 days before the actual 1952 United States presidential election between Republican Dwight D. Eisenhower and Democrat Adlai Stevenson II.
