= Circus Girl (film) =

1937 film by John H. Auer

- Theatrical release poster
- Directed by: John H. Auer
- Screenplay by: Adele Buffington; Bradford Ropes
- Produced by: Nat Levine
- Starring: June Travis; Robert Livingston; Donald Cook; Betty Compson; Charles Murray; Lucille Osborne
- Cinematography: Jack A. Marta
- Edited by: Lester Orlebeck
- Music by: Karl Hajos; Hugo Riesenfeld
- Production company: Republic Pictures
- Distributed by: Republic Pictures
- Release date: March 1, 1937
- Running time: 66 minutes
- Country: United States
- Language: English

Circus Girl is a 1937 American action film directed by John H. Auer and written by Adele Buffington and Bradford Ropes. The film stars June Travis, Robert Livingston, Donald Cook, Betty Compson, Charles Murray and Lucille Osborne. The film was March 1, 1937, by Republic Pictures.

== Plot ==
Trapeze artists Bob McAvoy and Charles Jerome have a successful act. Both develop a romantic interest in Kay Rogers, who also wants to become a circus performer.

Bob is furious when Charlie and Kay are secretly married, knowing that Charlie is also carrying on with Carlotta, the lion tamer. After a fight between the men, Charlie is injured in a fall and believes Bob dropped him on purpose.

Plotting his revenge, Charlie pretends to become manager of a new act featuring Bob with Kay, but behind the scenes sabotages the rig. Working without a net, Bob is about to fall into a den of lions, but when Kay tries to save him, Charlie's conscience gets the better of him. He rescues Bob, but plummets to his own demise.

== Cast ==
- June Travis as Kay Rogers
- Robert Livingston as Bob McAvoy
- Donald Cook as Charles Jerome
- Betty Compson as Carlotta
- Charles Murray as Slippery
- Lucille Osborne as Gloria
- Donald Kerr as Gabby
- Emma Dunn as Molly
- John Wray as Roebling
- John Holland as Reporter
- Kathryn Sheldon as Nurse
