= Join the Marines =

1937 film by Ralph Staub

- Theatrical release poster
- Directed by: Ralph Staub
- Screenplay by: Joseph Krumgold; Olive Cooper
- Story by: Karl Brown
- Produced by: Nat Levine
- Starring: Paul Kelly; June Travis; Purnell Pratt; Reginald Denny; Warren Hymer; Irving Pichel
- Cinematography: Ernest Miller
- Edited by: Ernest J. Nims; Lester Orlebeck
- Production company: Republic Pictures
- Distributed by: Republic Pictures
- Release date: January 25, 1937
- Running time: 67 minutes
- Country: United States
- Language: English

Join the Marines is a 1937 American action film directed by Ralph Staub and written by Joseph Krumgold and Olive Cooper. The film stars Paul Kelly, June Travis, Purnell Pratt, Reginald Denny, Warren Hymer and Irving Pichel. It was released on January 25, 1937 by Republic Pictures.

== Plot ==
New York policeman and Olympic javelin thrower Phil Donlan is on his way to the 1936 Olympic Games when he meets lovely Paula Denbrough on the ocean liner to Europe. Paula is planning to marry playboy Steve Lodge, but her father, a colonel with the Marine Corps, uses his influence to prevent the marriage. Paula believes that Phil is at fault and exacts revenge by exaggerating some of Phil's pranks into a scandal that causes his expulsion from the Olympics team and later from the NYPD. Paula and Phil fall in love on the return trip, but Phil has no career prospects and wishes to impress Paula, so he joins the Marines. When Paula and Phil's romance ends, Phil declares that he will become an officer in order that he may resign his commission and leave the Marines.

Phil shows great physical strength and leadership qualities, and he is rapidly promoted to the rank of corporal, and later, the acting first sergeant. He volunteers for duty in the South Seas and singlehandedly quashes a rebellion by challenging the natives to spear-throwing competitions that win their respect. When commissioned as a second lieutenant, Phil plans his resignation but faces a revolt by the natives, who do not respect Phil's replacement.

== Cast ==
- Paul Kelly as Philip H. "Phil" Donlan
- June Travis as Paula Denbrough
- Purnell Pratt as Col. J. B. Denbrough
- Reginald Denny as Steve Lodge
- Warren Hymer as Hoiman
- Irving Pichel as Col. Leonard
- Sterling Holloway as Alfred
- Ray "Crash" Corrigan as Lt. Hodge
- John Holland as Lieutenant
- Carleton Young as Corporal
- John Sheehan as O'Day
- Arthur Hoyt as Capt. James
- Richard Beach as Marine
- Howard Hickman as Pruitt
- Val Duran as Chinese Bartender
- Landers Stevens as Dr. McCullough
