= Rags to Riches (1941 film) =

1941 film by Joseph Kane

- Theatrical release poster
- Directed by: Joseph Kane
- Screenplay by: James R. Webb
- Produced by: Joseph Kane
- Starring: Alan Baxter; Mary Carlisle; Jerome Cowan; Adrian Morris; Ralf Harolde; Paul Porcasi
- Cinematography: William Nobles
- Edited by: Ernest J. Nims
- Music by: Mort Glickman
- Production company: Republic Pictures
- Distributed by: Republic Pictures
- Release date: July 31, 1941
- Running time: 57 minutes
- Country: United States
- Language: English

Rags to Riches is a 1941 American crime film directed by Joseph Kane and written by James R. Webb. The film stars Alan Baxter, Mary Carlisle, Jerome Cowan, Adrian Morris, Ralf Harolde and Paul Porcasi. The film was released on July 31, 1941, by Republic Pictures.

== Cast ==
- Alan Baxter as Jimmy Rogers
- Mary Carlisle as Carol Patrick
- Jerome Cowan as Marshall Abbott
- Adrian Morris as Bickford
- Ralf Harolde as Slip Conlan
- Paul Porcasi as Professor Del Rio
- Suzanne Kaaren as Glenda Hayes
- Eddie Acuff as Ace
- Rosina Galli as Maria
- Charles Trowbridge as Prosecutor
- Daisy Lee Mothershed as Julia
- Joan Blair as Belle Cassidy
- Francis Sayles as Bert Cassidy
