= The Night Hawk (1938 film) =

1938 film by Sidney Salkow

- Directed by: Sidney Salkow
- Screenplay by: Earl Felton
- Produced by: Herman Schlom
- Starring: Robert Livingston; June Travis; Robert Armstrong; Ben Welden; Lucien Littlefield; Joe Downing
- Cinematography: Jack A. Marta
- Edited by: Ernest J. Nims
- Music by: Cy Feuer; William Lava
- Production company: Republic Pictures
- Distributed by: Republic Pictures
- Release date: October 1, 1938
- Running time: 63 minutes
- Country: United States
- Language: English

The Night Hawk is a 1938 American crime film directed by Sidney Salkow and written by Earl Felton. The film stars Robert Livingston, June Travis, Robert Armstrong, Ben Welden, Lucien Littlefield and Joe Downing. The film was released on October 1, 1938, by Republic Pictures.

== Cast ==
- Robert Livingston as Slim Torrence
- June Travis as Della Parrish
- Robert Armstrong as Charlie McCormick
- Ben Welden as Otto Miller
- Lucien Littlefield as Parrish
- Joe Downing as Lefty
- Roland Got as Willie Sing
- Cy Kendall as Capt. Teague
- Paul Fix as Spider
- Bill Burrud as Bobby McCormick
- Charles C. Wilson as Lonigan
- Dwight Frye as John Colley
- Paul McVey as Larsen
- Robert Homans as Mulruney
