= Federal Man-Hunt =

1938 film by Nick Grinde

- Theatrical release poster
- Directed by: Nick Grinde
- Screenplay by: Maxwell Shane
- Story by: Samuel Fuller; William Lively
- Produced by: Armand Schaefer
- Starring: Robert Livingston; June Travis; John Gallaudet; Charles Halton; Ben Welden; Horace McMahon
- Cinematography: Ernest Miller
- Edited by: Edward Mann; Murray Seldeen
- Music by: Cy Feuer
- Production company: Republic Pictures
- Distributed by: Republic Pictures
- Release date: December 26, 1938
- Running time: 64 minutes
- Country: United States
- Language: English

Federal Man-Hunt is a 1938 American crime film directed by Nick Grinde and written by Maxwell Shane. The film stars Robert Livingston, June Travis, John Gallaudet, Charles Halton, Ben Welden and Horace McMahon. The film was released on December 26, 1938, by Republic Pictures.

== Plot ==
With inside help, criminal Pete Rennick escapes prison as well as roadblocks and searches set by the local police, now detective Bill Hasford is after him.

== Cast ==
- Robert Livingston as Bill Hasford
- June Travis as Anne Lawrence
- John Gallaudet as Pete Rennick
- Charles Halton as Damon Lauber
- Ben Welden as Goldie
- Horace McMahon as Snuffy Deegan
- Gene Morgan as Hawlings
- Matt McHugh as Archie Kilgore
- Jerry Tucker as Sylvester 'Scoop' Banning
- Sibyl Harris as Mrs. Banning
- Margaret Mann as Mrs. Ganter
- Frank Conklin as Mr. Beeber
- Gene Pearson as Joe Hawlings
