= Mr. District Attorney in the Carter Case =

1941 film by Bernard Vorhaus

- Theatrical release poster
- Directed by: Bernard Vorhaus
- Screenplay by: Sidney Sheldon; Ben Roberts
- Produced by: Leonard Fields
- Starring: James Ellison; Virginia Gilmore; Franklin Pangborn; Paul Harvey; Lynne Carver; Spencer Charters
- Cinematography: John Alton
- Edited by: Edward Mann
- Music by: Mort Glickman; Arnold Schwarzwald
- Production company: Republic Pictures
- Distributed by: Republic Pictures
- Release date: December 18, 1941
- Running time: 67 minutes
- Country: United States
- Language: English

Mr. District Attorney in the Carter Case is a 1941 American crime film directed by Bernard Vorhaus and written by Sidney Sheldon and Ben Roberts. The film stars James Ellison, Virginia Gilmore, Franklin Pangborn, Paul Harvey, Lynne Carver and Spencer Charters. The film was released on December 18, 1941, by Republic Pictures. It was a sequel to the film Mr. District Attorney, and was followed by Secrets of the Underground in 1942.

== Cast ==
- James Ellison as P. Cadwallader Jones
- Virginia Gilmore as Terry Parker
- Franklin Pangborn as Charley Towne
- Paul Harvey as Dist. Atty. Winton
- Lynne Carver as Joyce Belmont
- Spencer Charters as Judge White
- Douglas Fowley as Vincent Mackay
- John Eldredge as Andrew Belmont
- Eddie Acuff as Hypo
- John Sheehan as Beanie
- Bradley Page as Elliott Carter

== See also ==
- Mr. District Attorney (1941)
- Secrets of the Underground (1942)
