= Back in Circulation =

1937 film by Ray Enright

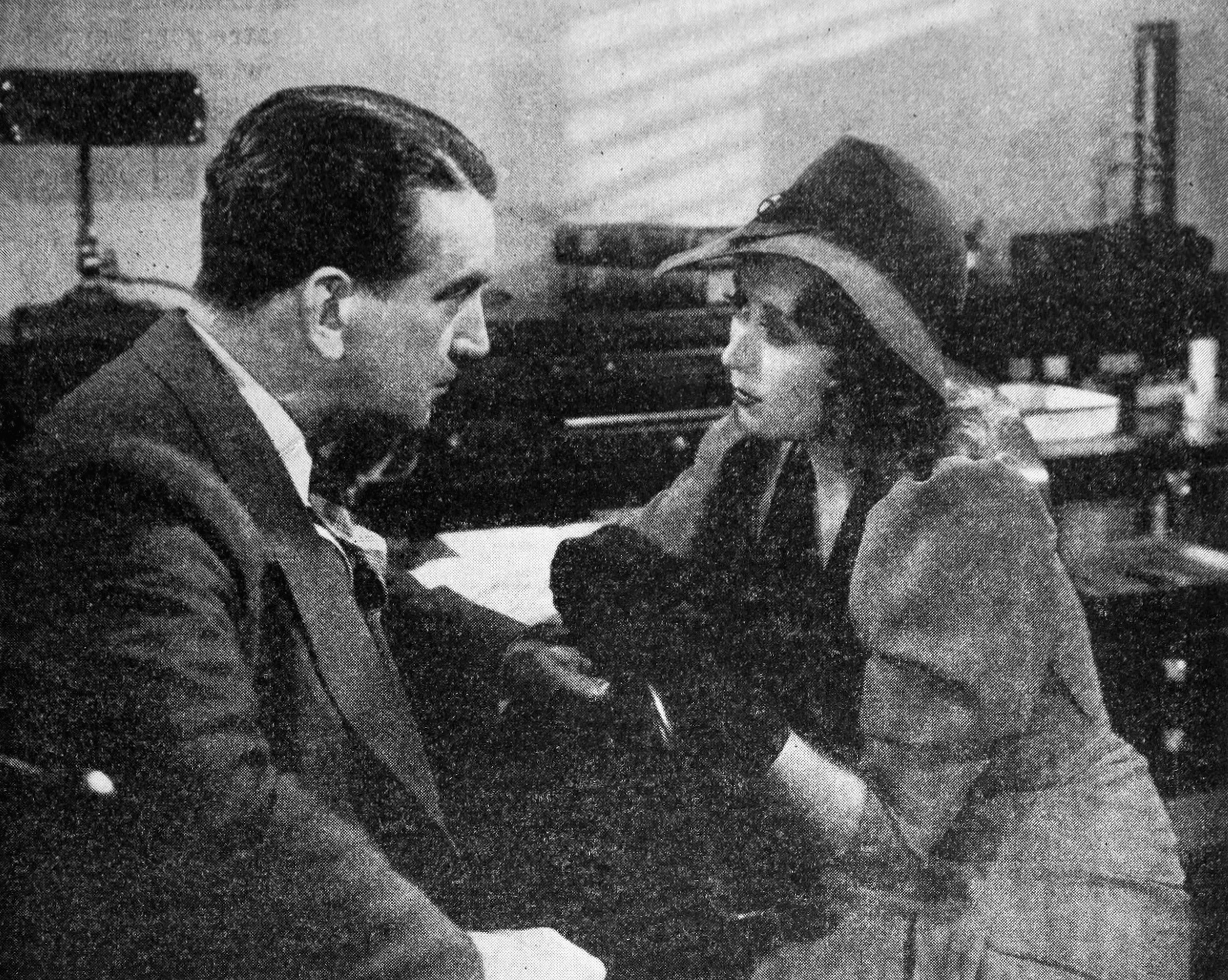
- Still with John Litel and Joan Blondell
- Directed by: Ray Enright
- Screenplay by: Warren Duff; Seton I. Miller
- Based on: "Angle Shooter"; 1937 Cosmopolitan story by Adela Rogers St. Johns
- Produced by: Samuel Bischoff
- Starring: Pat O'Brien; Joan Blondell; Margaret Lindsay
- Cinematography: Arthur L. Todd
- Edited by: Clarence Kolster
- Music by: Bernhard Kaun; Heinz Roemheld
- Production company: Warner Bros. Pictures
- Distributed by: Warner Bros. Pictures
- Release date: September 25, 1937
- Running time: 81 minutes
- Country: United States
- Language: English

Back in Circulation is a 1937 American comedy drama film directed by Ray Enright and starring Pat O'Brien and Joan Blondell. Based on the short story "Angle Shooter" by Adela Rogers St. Johns, Blondell plays a fast-moving newspaper reporter who senses a story when she spots a young recent widow partying in a night club.

== Plot ==
The top reporter on the Chronicle is a woman, "Timmy" Blake, who is engaged to marry Bill Morgan, her editor. Morgan assigns her to investigate the death of wealthy Spencer Wade, who left a note implicating Eugene Forde, his doctor.

Timmy believes that the victim's widow, Arline, is responsible. She goes to nightclub owner Sam Sherman to find out the name of a man Arline was seen with there. It turns out to be Carlton Whitney, a known gigolo.

Arline sues for libel when Timmy publishes a story implicating her. She is placed on trial for murder. It turns out Whitney has been blackmailing her, but when Wade suspected her of an affair, his suicide note implicated Forde by mistake. Timmy and Morgan get the story straightened out, and Arline ends up marrying the doctor.

== Cast ==
- Pat O'Brien as Bill Morgan
- Joan Blondell as Timothea 'Timmy' Blake
- Margaret Lindsay as Arline Wade
- John Litel as Dr. Eugene Forde
- Eddie Acuff as Murphy
- Craig Reynolds as 'Snoopy' Davis
- George E. Stone as Mac
- Walter Byron as Carlton Whitney
- Ben Welden as Sam Sherman
- Regis Toomey as Buck
- Raymond Brown as Attorney Bottsford
- Gordon Hart as Dr. Hanley
- Granville Bates as The Coroner
- Herbert Rawlinson as District Attorney Saunders
- Spencer Charters as Plattstown Sheriff
- unbilled players include Frank Faylen, Edward Gargan, and Milton Kibbee
