= Little Orphan Annie (1938 film) =

1938 film by Ben Holmes

- Theatrical release poster
- Directed by: Ben Holmes
- Screenplay by: Budd Schulberg; Samuel Ornitz
- Story by: Samuel Ornitz; Endre Bohem
- Based on: Little Orphan Annie by Harold Gray
- Produced by: John Speaks
- Starring: Ann Gillis; Robert Kent; June Travis; J. Farrell MacDonald; J.M. Kerrigan
- Cinematography: Frank Redman
- Edited by: Robert Bischoff
- Music by: George Bassman; Louis Forbes; Joseph Nussbaum
- Production company: Colonial Pictures Corporation
- Distributed by: Paramount Pictures
- Release date: December 2, 1938
- Running time: 57 minutes
- Country: United States
- Language: English

Little Orphan Annie is a lost 1938 American comedy film directed by Ben Holmes, and written by Budd Schulberg and Samuel Ornitz. It is based on the comic strip Little Orphan Annie by Harold Gray. The film stars Ann Gillis, Robert Kent, June Travis, J. Farrell MacDonald, and J.M. Kerrigan. The film was released on December 2, 1938, by Paramount Pictures.

== Production ==
Little Orphan Annie was the first film produced by John Speaks' production company Colonial Pictures.

== Plot ==
Annie, an orphan, is befriended by a fight manager, "Pop" Corrigan. She brings him Johnny Adams, a promising prizefighter. Annie gets the people of a poor tenement district neighborhood to finance his training. Their goal is have him and share the winnings to solve the residents financial problems.

On the night of Johnny's big fight, a gambling syndicate locks him in a gymnasium, and it appears the neighborhood folks will lose their investment. Last minute, a group of neighborhood women break Johnny Adams out of captivity so that he can win the match. Johnny Adams wins the match and the neighborhood's investment is saved.

== Cast ==
- Ann Gillis as Annie Bennett
- Robert Kent as Johnny Adams
- June Travis as Mary Ellen
- J. Farrell MacDonald as "Pop" Corrigan
- J.M. Kerrigan as Tom Jennings
- Margaret Armstrong as Mrs. Jennings
- Sarah Padden as Mrs. Nora Moriarty
- James Burke as Mike Moriarty
- Ian Maclaren as Soo Long
- Dorothy Vaughan as Mrs. Milligan
- Ben Welden as Spot McGee
- Charles Coleman as The Butler
- Eddie Gribbon as Monk
- Vince Lombardi as Ska-Booch
- Harry Tyler as O.O. Pike
- Jack Rice as Bugs MacIntosh
- Tommy Bupp as Timmie Milligan
- Charles C. Wilson as Val Lewis
- Dick Rich as Hutch

== Reception ==
Contemporary critics gave the film negative reviews. Film critics of Variety who previewed the film a week before release wrote that it was "a stupid and thoroughly boresome story, with mediocre direction". Film critics noted Ann Gillis' acting was a highlight of the film, but disapproved of the casting and direction of supporting actors.
