= Exiled to Shanghai =

1937 film by Nick Grinde

- Original lobby card
- Directed by: Nick Grinde; Armand Schaefer
- Written by: Wellyn Totman
- Produced by: Armand Schaefer
- Starring: Wallace Ford; June Travis; Dean Jagger
- Cinematography: Ernest Miller
- Edited by: Howard O'Neill
- Music by: Alberto Colombo
- Production company: Republic Pictures
- Distributed by: Republic Pictures
- Release date: 20 December 1937
- Running time: 65 minutes
- Country: United States
- Language: English

Exiled to Shanghai is a 1937 American comedy film directed by Nick Grinde and Armand Schaefer and starring Wallace Ford, June Travis, and Dean Jagger.

== Cast ==
- Wallace Ford as Ted Young
- June Travis as Nancy Jones
- Dean Jagger as Charlie Sears
- William Bakewell as Andrew
- Arthur Lake as Bud
- Jonathan Hale as J.B. Willet
- William Harrigan as Grant Powell
- Sarah Padden as Aunt Jane
- Syd Saylor as Maloney
- Charles Trowbridge as Walters
- Johnny Arthur as Poppolas
- Maurice Cass as Hotel Manager
- Minerva Urecal as Claire
- Sally Payne as Mabel

== Production ==
Despite its exotic-sounding title, none of the film is actually set in Shanghai. The film's sets were designed by art director John Victor Mackay.

== Bibliography ==
- Dooley, Roger. From Scarface to Scarlett: American Films in the 1930s. Harcourt Brace Jovanovich, 1984.
