= Love Is on the Air =

1937 film by Nick Grinde

- Film poster
- Directed by: Nick Grinde
- Written by: Roy Chanslor
- Screenplay by: Morton Grant; George Bricker; Pat C. Flick
- Based on: Love Is on the Air (short story)
- Produced by: Bryan Foy; Hal B. Wallis; Jack L. Warner
- Starring: Ronald Reagan; June Travis; Eddie Acuff; Ben Welden
- Cinematography: James Van Trees
- Edited by: Doug Gould
- Music by: Howard Jackson
- Production company: Warner Bros. Pictures
- Distributed by: Warner Bros. Pictures
- Release dates: September 30, 1937 (Des Moines, Iowa); October 28, 1937 (Los Angeles); November 10, 1937 (New York)
- Running time: 59 minutes
- Country: United States
- Language: English

Love is on the Air is a 1937 American mystery film directed by Nick Grinde and starring Ronald Reagan (in his film debut), June Travis, Eddie Acuff, Robert Barrat, Raymond Hatton and Willard Parker. It was the first of three remakes of the 1933 Paul Muni picture Hi, Nellie!, to be followed by You Can't Escape Forever (1942) and The House Across the Street (1949).

== Plot ==
Trailer

Reckless radio commentator Andy McCaine finds trouble when he attacks a corrupt city government, so his boss forces him to host an innocuous children's program.

== Cast ==
- Ronald Reagan as Andy McCaine
- June Travis as Jo Hopkins
- Eddie Acuff as 'Dunk' Glover
- Ben Welden as 'Nicey' Ferguson
- Robert Barrat as J.D. Harrington
- Addison Richards as E.E. Nichols
- Raymond Hatton as Weston
- Tommy Bupp as Mouse
- Dickie Jones as Bill - Mouse's Friend
- Willard Parker as Les Quimby
- William Hopper as Eddie Gould
- Spec O'Donnell as Pinky
- Herbert Rawlinson as Mr. George Copelin
- Lynne Roberts (credited as Mary Hart) as Mrs. George Copelin
- Jack Mower as Police Captain Lang

== Release ==
Love Is on the Air was first previewed in Des Moines, Iowa on September 16, 1937, where Ronald Reagan, known as "Dutch", had recently worked as a sports announcer for radio station WHO. Reagan's parents, en route to visit him in California, attended the preview screening, which brought Reagan's mother to tears.

The film was afforded a Hollywood-style premiere on September 30 in Des Moines. Before the film began, the audience heard a live telephone conversation between Reagan and Des Moines civic leaders and other supporters, including Reagan's brother Neil Reagan, who attended in person.

== Reception ==
In a contemporary review for The New York Times, critic Bosley Crowther called Love Is on the Air "a modest little comedy-melodrama which makes no pretentions to class and even less to credibility".

== See also ==
- Ronald Reagan filmography
