= Secrets of the Underground =

1942 film by William Morgan

- Theatrical release poster
- Directed by: William Morgan
- Screenplay by: Robert Tasker; Daniel Mainwaring
- Story by: Daniel Mainwaring
- Produced by: Leonard Fields
- Starring: John Hubbard; Virginia Grey; Lloyd Corrigan; Robin Raymond; Miles Mander; Olin Howland
- Cinematography: Ernest Miller
- Edited by: Arthur Roberts
- Music by: Mort Glickman; Marlin Skiles
- Production company: Republic Pictures
- Distributed by: Republic Pictures
- Release date: December 18, 1942
- Running time: 70 minutes
- Country: United States
- Language: English

Secrets of the Underground is a 1942 American crime film directed by William Morgan and written by Robert Tasker and Daniel Mainwaring. The film stars John Hubbard, Virginia Grey, Lloyd Corrigan, Robin Raymond, Miles Mander and Olin Howland. The film was released on December 18, 1942, by Republic Pictures. The film was the third of a series of films based on the radio series Mr. District Attorney, including Mr. District Attorney and Mr. District Attorney in the Carter Case.

== Plot ==
With the help of a WAAC group, Mr. District Attorney smashes a Nazi spy-ring that is selling counterfeit War Stamps and Bonds.

== Cast ==
- John Hubbard as P. Cadwallader Jones
- Virginia Grey as Terry Parker
- Lloyd Corrigan as Maurice Vaughn
- Robin Raymond as Marianne Panois
- Miles Mander as Paul Panois
- Olin Howland as Oscar Mayberry
- Ben Welden as Henchman Joe
- Marla Shelton as Mrs. Perkins
- Neil Hamilton as Harry Kermit
- Ken Christy as Investigator Dave Cleary
- Dick Rich as Maxie Schmidt
- Eula Morgan as Mrs. Calhoun

== See also ==
- Mr. District Attorney (1941)
- Mr. District Attorney in the Carter Case (1941)
