= The Kid Comes Back =

1938 film

- Directed by: B. Reeves Eason
- Written by: George Bricker; E.J. Flanagan
- Produced by: Bryan Foy
- Starring: Wayne Morris; Barton MacLane; June Travis
- Cinematography: Arthur Edeson
- Edited by: Warren Low
- Music by: David Raksin
- Production company: Warner Bros.
- Distributed by: Warner Bros.
- Release date: February 12, 1938
- Running time: 60 minutes
- Country: United States
- Language: English

The Kid Comes Back is a 1938 American sports film directed by B. Reeves Eason and starring Wayne Morris, Barton MacLane, June Travis and "Slapsie Maxie" Rosenbloom. The title may be meant to remind audiences of Kid Galahad, a smash hit prizefight movie released the previous year starring Edward G. Robinson, Bette Davis, Humphrey Bogart, and Wayne Morris in the title role as a young boxer very similar to his part in The Kid Comes Back.

== Cast ==
- Wayne Morris as Rush Conway
- Barton MacLane as 'Gunner' Malone
- June Travis as Mary Malone
- Maxie Rosenbloom as Stan Wilson
- Archie Robbins as Kenneth Rockwell
- Dickie Jones as Bobby Doyle
- Joseph Crehan as Danny Lockridge
- Frank Otto as Joey Meade
- Robert Paige as Radio Announcer
- Herbert Rawlinson as Mr. Redmann
- Robert Homans as Policeman Mike Dougherty
- Wendell Niles as Radio Announcer
- Ward Bond as Spike - Sparring Partner
- Louise Stanley as Telephone Operator

== Production ==
Produced under the working titles "Don't Pull Your Punches" and "Trial Horse." Filming began in November 1936, and had reached the editing room by early December 1936.

== Preservation ==
A 16 mm triacetate positive print of The Kid Comes Back is held by George Eastman House.
