= King of Hockey =

1936 film by Noel M. Smith

- Theatrical release poster
- Directed by: Noel M. Smith
- Screenplay by: George Bricker
- Produced by: Bryan Foy
- Starring: Dick Purcell; Anne Nagel; Marie Wilson; Wayne Morris; George E. Stone; Joseph Crehan
- Cinematography: L. William O'Connell
- Edited by: Harold McLernon
- Music by: Howard Jackson
- Production company: Warner Bros. Pictures
- Distributed by: Warner Bros. Pictures
- Release date: December 19, 1936
- Running time: 55 minutes
- Country: United States
- Language: English

King of Hockey is a 1936 American drama film directed by Noel M. Smith and written by George Bricker. The film stars Dick Purcell, Anne Nagel, Marie Wilson, Wayne Morris, George E. Stone and Joseph Crehan. The film was released by Warner Bros. Pictures on December 19, 1936.

== Plot ==
College hockey hero Gabby Dugan turns professional, and he and new teammate/roommate Jumbo Mullins become acquainted with the O'Rourke sisters, Kathleen and Peggy, who bring their family to a game. Prior to the game, Gabby is approached by gambler Nick Torga offering to pay him to intentionally take penalties that will harm his team chances. He refuses the offer but nonetheless proceeds to intentionally take penalties because the O'Rourkes sit next the penalty box and his being sent there allows him to court Kathleen. Noting Gabby's excessive penalties but unaware of his true motives, Nick assumes Gabby has decided to help him after all and sends a payment to his residence. Upon seeing the money, Jumbo also concludes that Gabby has agreed to take payment in exchange for intentionally losing games. When Jumbo accuses Gabby directly, they fight and Jumbo clubs Gabby over the head with a stick.

Gabby's head injury results in a degradation of his eyesight. His doctor advises him to immediately begin wearing glasses to head off further damage, but Gabby refuses, planning to make it through the remainder of the playoff season first. In the meantime, team officials have also noticed his seeming intent upon taking penalties and are now also suspicious that he's involved in throwing games for gamblers. In the next game, Gabby's poor eyesight causes him to play poorly, including shooting the puck into his own team's net. For the coach, this confirms his suspicions and he has Gabby kicked out of the league. Meanwhile, the delay in treating his eyesight causes him to go completely blind.

The only hope for restoring Gabby's eyesight is an operation that he cannot afford. But he stubbornly refuses to ask for help, especially not from the wealthy Kathleen, and he instead retreats into a life a solitude. When Jumbo comes across Gabby one day, Gabby explains what had really occurred but still angrily demands to be left alone. Jumbo reports the situation to Kathleen, who then visits Gabby herself and convinces him to have the operation. In the end, Gabby's eyesight is restored and he resumes both his on-ice heroics and his romance with Kathleen.

== Cast ==
- Dick Purcell as Gabby Dugan
- Anne Nagel as Kathleen O'Rourke
- Marie Wilson as Elsie
- Wayne Morris as Bill 'Jumbo' Mullins
- George E. Stone as Nick Torga
- Joseph Crehan as Mike Trotter
- Ann Gillis as Peggy 'Princess' O'Rourke
- Gordon Hart as Dr. Vernon Noble
- Dora Clement as Mrs. O'Rourke
- Guy Usher as Mr. O'Rourke
- Garry Owen as Jitters McCarthy, the Referee
- Max Hoffman Jr. as Torchy Myers
- George Beranger as Evans, Kathleen's Chauffeur
- Frank Faylen as Swede
- Frank Bruno as Loogan
- Harry Davenport as Tom McKenna

== See also ==
- List of films about ice hockey
