= The Invisible Menace =

1938 film

- Film poster
- Directed by: John Farrow
- Screenplay by: Crane Wilbur
- Based on: Without Warning; 1937 play by Ralph Spencer Zink
- Produced by: Bryan Foy executive Hal B. Wallis; Jack L. Warner
- Starring: Boris Karloff; Marie Wilson
- Cinematography: L. William O'Connell
- Edited by: Harold McLernon
- Music by: Bernhard Kaun
- Distributed by: Warner Bros. Pictures
- Release date: January 22, 1938
- Running time: 55 minutes
- Country: United States
- Language: English

The Invisible Menace is a 1938 American mystery film directed by John Farrow and starring Boris Karloff. It was also known as Without Warning.

== Plot ==
An army private and his new bride are trying to honeymoon on an island occupied by the military and a murderer.

== Cast ==
- Boris Karloff as Mr. Jevries, aka Dolman
- Marie Wilson as Sally Wilson Pratt
- Eddie Craven as Pvt. Eddie Pratt
- Regis Toomey as Lt. Matthews
- Henry Kolker as Col. George Hackett
- Cy Kendall as Col. Bob Rogers
- Charles Trowbridge as Dr. Brooks
- Eddie Acuff as Cpl. Sanger
- Frank Faylen as Al (private of the guard)
- Phyllis Barry as Mrs. Aline Dolman
- Harland Tucker as Ted Reilly
- William Haade as Pvt. Ferris
- John Ridgely as Pvt. Innes (scenes deleted)
- Jack Mower as Sgt. Peterson
- Anderson Lawler as Pvt. Abbott (as Anderson Lawlor)
- John Harron as Pvt. Murphy

== Production ==
The film was based on a play Without Warning by Ralph Spencer Zink which had a short run on Broadway in May 1937. The New York Times called it a "competent detective play."

Warner Bros. Pictures bought the film rights and assigned Boris Karloff to star and John Farrow to direct. Jane Wyman was originally meant to play the female lead.

Wyman was replaced by Marie Wilson. Filming started August 1937.

== See also ==
- Boris Karloff filmography
