= Jailbreak (1936 film) =

1936 film by Nick Grinde

- Directed by: Nick Grinde
- Screenplay by: Robert Hardy Andrews; Joseph Hoffman
- Story by: Jonathan Finn
- Produced by: Bryan Foy
- Starring: Barton MacLane; June Travis; Craig Reynolds; Dick Purcell; Joe King; George E. Stone
- Cinematography: Arthur L. Todd
- Edited by: Harold McLernon
- Music by: Bernhard Kaun
- Production company: Warner Bros. Pictures
- Distributed by: Warner Bros. Pictures
- Release date: August 5, 1936
- Running time: 60 minutes
- Country: United States
- Language: English

Jailbreak is a 1936 American (Precursor) film noir, crime, mystery, drama film directed by Nick Grinde and written by Robert Hardy Andrews and Joseph Hoffman. The film stars Barton MacLane, June Travis, Craig Reynolds, Dick Purcell, Joe King, and George E. Stone. The film was released by Warner Bros. Pictures on August 5, 1936.

== Plot ==
A ex-racketeer has a fight with a cop and goes to prison, and things happen when he tries to get paroled, and a newspaper reporter tries to figure it out.

== Cast ==
- Barton MacLane as Detective Captain Rourke
- June Travis as Jane Rogers
- Craig Reynolds as Ken Williams
- Dick Purcell as Ed Slayden
- Joe King as Mike Eagan
- George E. Stone as Weeper
- Joseph Crehan as Warden
- Addison Richards as Dan Varner
- Eddie Acuff as Sig Patton
- Charles Middleton as Dan Stone
- Mary Treen as Gladys Joy
- Henry Hall as Pop Anderson
- Robert Emmett Keane as City Editor
