= Nick Grinde =

American film director

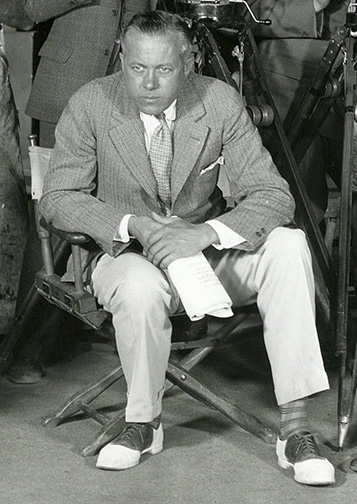
- Grinde in 1928
- Born: January 12, 1893; Madison, Wisconsin, US
- Died: June 19, 1979 (aged 86); Los Angeles, California, US
- Occupations: Film director Screenwriter
- Years active: 1928-1945

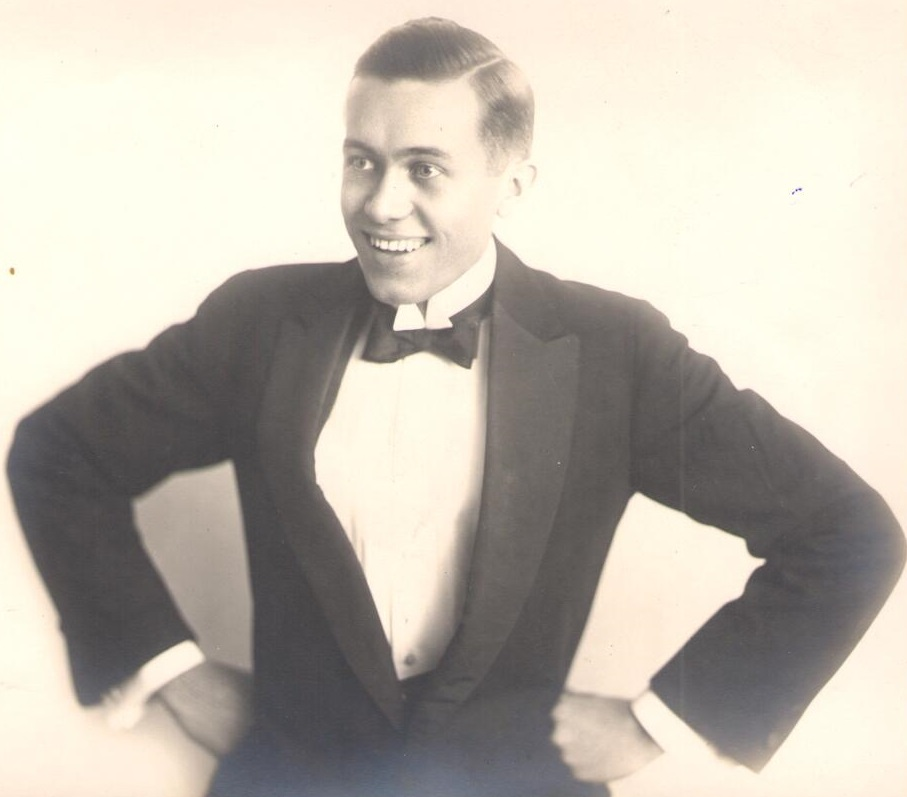
Nick Grinde in the 1910s

Nick Grinde (January 12, 1893 – June 19, 1979) was an American film director and screenwriter. He directed 57 films between 1928 and 1945.

== Biography ==
Born Harry A. Grinde in Madison, Wisconsin but nicknamed "Nick", Grinde graduated from the University of Wisconsin. He later moved to New York and worked in Vaudeville. Grinde became a Hollywood film writer and director in the late 1920s, and was often assigned to familiarize Broadway stage directors with the techniques of film making. As a director, he is considered one of American cinema's early B film specialists. Notable films include The Man they Could Not Hang with Boris Karloff, and Ronald Reagan's first motion picture: Love is on the Air (1937). As a screenwriter, he is credited as a co-writer of Laurel and Hardy's Babes in Toyland (1934).

Throughout his career, Grinde was a writer of short stories, articles and columns usually about show business and film making in early Hollywood. Prime examples include "Pictures for Peanuts" (Saturday Evening Post, December 29, 1945), a humorous B picture "how-to," and "Where's Vaudeville At?" (Saturday Evening Post, January 11, 1930).

Grinde died in Los Angeles, California in 1979 at the age of 86. In the early 1940s, he was engaged to actress Marie Wilson. Later, he married Korean-American actress Hazel Shon.

The Academy of Motion Picture Arts and Sciences houses the Nick Grinde Papers in its Special Collections.

== Selected filmography ==
- Riders of the Dark (1928)
- Beyond the Sierras (1928)
- Morgan's Last Raid (1929)
- The Desert Rider (1929)
- The Divorcee (1930 – writer)
- Good News (1930)
- Remote Control (1930)
- This Modern Age (1931)
- Shopworn (1932)
- Vanity Street (1932)
- Menu (1933)
- Babes in Toyland (1934 – writer)
- Stone of Silver Creek (1935)
- Border Brigands (1935)
- How to Sleep (1935)
- Ladies Crave Excitement (1935)
- Public Enemy's Wife (1936)
- Lucky Fugitives (1936)
- Jailbreak (1936)
- The Captain's Kid (1936)
- Fugitive in the Sky (1936)
- Public Wedding (1937)
- White Bondage (1937)
- Love Is on the Air (1937)
- Exiled to Shanghai (1937)
- Mis dos amores (1938)
- Delinquent Parents (1938)
- Down in 'Arkansaw' (1938)
- Federal Man-Hunt (1938)
- King of Chinatown (1939)
- Sudden Money (1939)
- Million Dollar Legs (1939)
- Scandal Sheet (1939)
- The Man They Could Not Hang (1939)
- A Woman Is the Judge (1939)
- The Man with Nine Lives (1940)
- Before I Hang (1940)
- Convicted Woman (1940)
- Friendly Neighbors (1940)
- Girls of the Road (1940)
- Mountain Moonlight (1941)
- Hitler – Dead or Alive (1942)
- The Girl from Alaska (1942)
- We've Never Been Licked (1943)
- Road to Alcatraz (1945)
