= The Man with Nine Lives (film) =

1940 science horror film starring Boris Karloff

- Film poster
- Directed by: Nick Grinde
- Screenplay by: Karl Brown
- Story by: Harold Shumate
- Starring: Boris Karloff
- Cinematography: Benjamin H. Kline (as Benjamin Kline)
- Edited by: Al Clark
- Production company: Columbia Pictures
- Distributed by: Columbia Pictures
- Release date: April 18, 1940
- Running time: 74 minutes
- Country: United States
- Language: English

The Man with Nine Lives is a 1940 American horror science fiction film directed by Nick Grinde and starring Boris Karloff.

Both The Man with Nine Lives and The Man They Could Not Hang were based in part on the real-life saga of Dr. Robert Cornish, a University of California professor who, in 1934, announced that he had restored life to a dog named Lazarus, which he had put to death by clinical means. The resulting publicity (including a Time magazine article and motion picture footage of the allegedly re-animated canine) led to Cornish being booted off campus.

== Plot ==
Dr. Tim Mason, a medical researcher experimenting in "frozen therapy" visits the deserted home of Dr. Leon Kravaal, the originator of the therapy, who has been missing for ten years. After discovering a secret passage in the basement, Dr. Mason and his nurse discover Kravaal frozen in an ice chambers. The doctor and nurse successfully revive Kravaal and Kravaal explains in flashback how he and five other men came to be frozen ten years earlier. One man is found dead. However, the other four men are located and revived. Because of closed-minded prejudice against science, one of the four men destroys Kravaal's formula for "frozen therapy." In an act of rage and self preservation, Kravaal isn't able to stop the man in time from destroying it and shoots and kills him. Not having memorized the formula as of yet, Kravaal holds everyone captive in order to use them as guinea pigs, hoping to unlock the key to "frozen therapy" for a second time.

== Cast ==
- Boris Karloff as Dr. Leon Kravaal
- Roger Pryor as Dr. Tim Mason
- Jo Ann Sayers as Judith Blair
- Stanley Brown as Bob Adams
- John Dilson as John Hawthorne
- Hal Taliaferro as Sheriff Stanton
- Byron Foulger as Dr. Henry Bassett
- Charles Trowbridge as Dr. Harvey
- Ernie Adams as Pete Daggett
- Bruce Bennett as a state trooper
- Minta Durfee as a frozen therapy patient in opening scene

== See also ==
- Boris Karloff filmography
