= That Certain Woman =

1937 film by Edmund Goulding

- Original poster
- Directed by: Edmund Goulding
- Written by: Edmund Goulding
- Produced by: Hal B. Wallis; Jack L. Warner
- Starring: Bette Davis; Henry Fonda; Anita Louise
- Cinematography: Ernest Haller
- Edited by: Jack Killifer
- Music by: Max Steiner
- Production company: Warner Bros. Pictures
- Distributed by: Warner Bros. Pictures
- Release date: September 18, 1937
- Running time: 93 minutes
- Country: United States
- Language: English
- Box office: $1 million

That Certain Woman is a 1937 American melodramatic film written and directed by Edmund Goulding and starring Bette Davis, Henry Fonda and Anita Louise. It is a remake of Goulding's 1929 film The Trespasser, Gloria Swanson's first sound film.

== Plot ==
Mary Donnell is a naive young woman married to Al Haines, a bootlegger who is killed during the St. Valentine's Day massacre. To support herself, she has taken a job as a secretary to married attorney Lloyd Rogers, who is attracted to her but keeps his feelings secret. Jack Merrick Jr., the playboy son of a wealthy client, elopes with Mary, but his disapproving father interferes and has the marriage annulled. Soon after, Mary discovers that she is pregnant and decides to have the child without informing Jack.

Jack later marries Florence ”Flip” Carson, a woman of his own social class, who is later crippled in an automobile accident. Mary returns to working for Lloyd.

Lloyd dies several years later at Mary's apartment, leaving the bulk of his estate to Mary. A press uproar ensues that exposes information about Mary's past. Jack appears and offers to adopt Mary's son, and he discovers that he is the boy's father. Lloyd's wife, believing that Mary's son is her husband's illegitimate child, attempts to overturn the will.

When Jack's father learns that the boy is his grandson, the elder Merrick institutes proceedings to have Mary declared unfit and the child removed from her custody. Jack is furious and argues all night with his father. Florence visits Mary the next morning and, to her surprise, Mary finds Florence kind and sympathetic. Mary insists that Jack stay with Florence and allows Jack and Florence to have the child. Mary leaves for Europe. When Florence later dies, Jack locates Mary and proclaims that he is coming to join her.

== Cast ==
- Bette Davis as Mary Donnell
- Henry Fonda as Jack Merrick Jr.
- Anita Louise as Florence ”Flip” Carson Merrick
- Ian Hunter as Lloyd Rogers
- Donald Crisp as Jack Merrick Sr.
- Hugh O'Connell as Virgil Whitaker
- Katherine Alexander as Mrs. Rogers
- Mary Phillips as Amy
- Minor Watson as Tildon
- Sidney Toler as Detective Neely
- Charles Trowbridge as Dr. James
- Norman Willis as Fred
- Herbert Rawlinson as Dr. Hartman
- Tim Henning as Kenyon
- Dwane Day as Jackie
- Jeff York as Reporter (uncredited)

== Production ==
Bette Davis said:

"[it] was certainly not one of my favorite scripts. There was a falseness to the whole project. But I did meet and work with Edmund Goulding for the first time. He concentrated on attractive shots of me—in other words, gave me the star treatment. It was the first time I had this. I was always a member of the cast—a leading member—but not made special in the way Goulding made me special in this film."

Davis and Goulding would later collaborate on three more films: Dark Victory (1939), The Old Maid (1939) and The Great Lie (1941).

== Reception ==
In a contemporary review for The New York Times, critic Frank S. Nugent wrote: "For all the heaviness of its theme, for the hopeless monotony of its heroine's ill-fortune, the picture has dramatic value ... Miss Davis performs valiantly as usual, giving color to a role which, in lesser hands, might have been colorless."

Time magazine described the film as "what is known as a players' picture; everyone gets the call, and everyone responds with all the theatrical craft he can summon up."

Variety wrote: "The production has class and atmosphere ... a finely made picture which deserves and will get extended first runs and which shoves Bette Davis a round or two higher as box office lure ... [It] demands more of her talent than any film in which she has appeared ... She displays screen acting of the highest order."
