= Ann Gillis =

American actress (1927–2018)

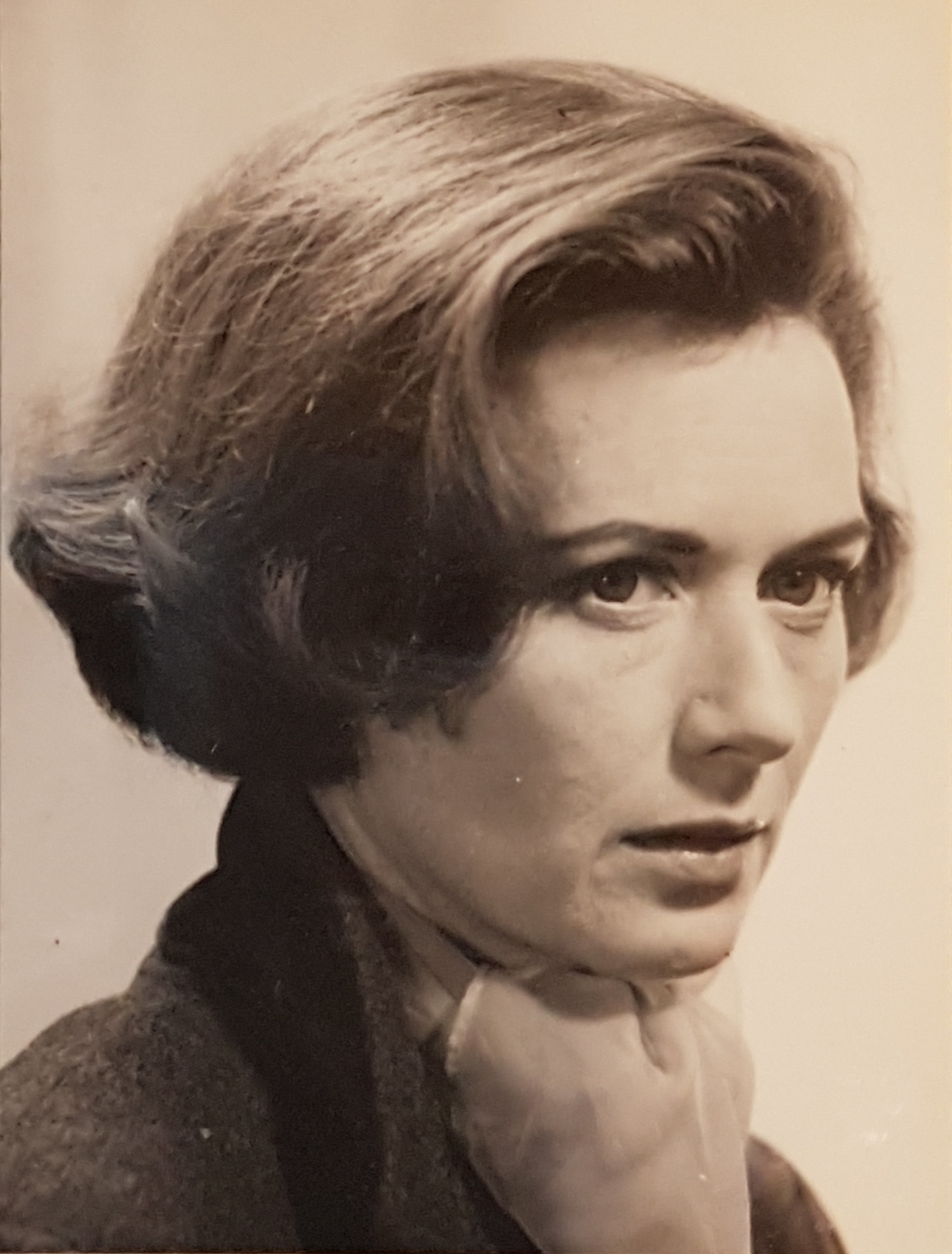
- Gillis in 1966
- Born: Alma Mabel Conner; February 12, 1927; Little Rock, Arkansas, U.S.
- Died: January 31, 2018 (aged 90); Horam, East Sussex, England
- Occupations: Actress, voice artist
- Years active: 1934–1968
- Spouse(s): Paul Ziebold (m. 1947; div. 1951) Richard Fraser (m. 1952; div. 1970) René Van Hulst (m. 1991; died 1999)
- Children: 3

Alma Mabel Conner (February 12, 1927 – January 31, 2018), known professionally as Ann Gillis, was an American actress, best known for her film roles as a child actress. She performed the voice of Faline (as young adult) in the 1942 Disney animated film Bambi.

== Life and career ==
Gillis was born in Little Rock, Arkansas on February 12, 1927. She started her career in the early 1930s, when she was aged 7. After small roles, she got her first major part in King of Hockey (1936). In the following years, she played supporting roles, and Warner Brothers Pictures wanted her to be another Shirley Temple, but she mostly played "spoiled brats".

Among her bigger roles were Becky Thatcher in David O. Selznick's The Adventures of Tom Sawyer (1938) and Annie in Little Orphan Annie (1938). She also provided the voice of Faline in Bambi (1942).

She ended her Hollywood film career in 1947 and married her second husband, British actor Richard Fraser in 1952. Following her Hollywood career, she turned to occasional television work in the UK. Gillis appeared in two episodes of The Saint in 1964-1965, followed by a small part in 2001: A Space Odyssey, playing Dr. Poole's mother. She is seen onscreen congratulating her son on his birthday. She later lived in Belgium.

On January 31, 2018, Gillis died at a nursing home in Horam, East Sussex, England, at the age of 90.

== Filmography ==
Year	Title	Role	Note
1934	Men in White	Flower Girl	uncredited
1936	The Great Ziegfeld	Mary Lou as a Child	Uncredited
1936	The Singing Cowboy	Lou Ann Stevens	
1936	Postal Inspector	Little Alice	uncredited
1936	The Garden of Allah	Convent Girl #2	uncredited
1936	The Man I Marry	Little Girl	uncredited
1936	Under Your Spell	Gwendolyn	uncredited
1936	King of Hockey	Peggy 'Princess' O'Rourke	
1937	Off to the Races	Winnie Mae	
1937	You Can't Buy Luck	Peggy	uncredited
1937	The Californian	Rosalia as a Child	
1938	The Adventures of Tom Sawyer	Becky Thatcher	
1938	Peck's Bad Boy with the Circus	Fleurette de Cava	
1938	Little Orphan Annie	Annie	
1939	Beau Geste	Isobel Rivers as a Child	
1939	The Under-Pup	Letty Lou	
1940	Edison, the Man	Nancy Grey	
1940	All This, and Heaven Too	Emily Schuyler	
1940	My Love Came Back	Valerie Malette	
1940	Little Men	Nan	
1941	Nice Girl?	Nancy Dana	
1941	Mr. Dynamite	Joey, a.k.a. Abigail	
1941	Glamour Boy	Brenda Lee	
1942	Meet the Stewarts	Jane Goodwin	
1942	Tough as They Come	Frankie Taylor	
1942	Bambi	Faline (as a young adult)	voice, uncredited
1942	'Neath Brooklyn Bridge	Sylvia	
1943	Stage Door Canteen	Herself	
1943	The Man from Music Mountain	Penny Winters	
1944	Since You Went Away	Becky Anderson – Class President	uncredited
1944	Janie	Paula Rainey	
1944	In Society	Gloria	
1944	A Wave, a WAC and a Marine	Judy	
1945	The Cheaters	Angela Pidgeon	
1946	Gay Blades	Helen Dowell	
1946	Janie Gets Married	Paula Rainey	
1946	The Time of Their Lives	Nora O'Leary	
1946	Sweetheart of Sigma Chi	Sue	
1947	Big Town After Dark	Susan Peabody LaRue	
1968	2001: A Space Odyssey	Poole's Mother	
