= Mr. Dynamite (film) =

1941 film

- Theatrical release poster
- Directed by: John Rawlins
- Screenplay by: Stanley Rubin
- Story by: Stanley Rubin
- Produced by: Marshall Grant
- Starring: Lloyd Nolan; Irene Hervey; J. Carrol Naish; Robert Armstrong; Ann Gillis; Frank Gaby; Elisabeth Risdon
- Cinematography: John W. Boyle
- Edited by: Ted J. Kent
- Music by: Hans J. Salter
- Production company: Universal Pictures
- Distributed by: Universal Pictures
- Release date: March 1, 1941
- Running time: 63 minutes
- Country: United States
- Language: English
- Budget: $93,000

Mr. Dynamite is a 1941 American mystery thriller film directed by John Rawlins and written by Stanley Rubin. The film stars Lloyd Nolan, Irene Hervey, J. Carrol Naish, Robert Armstrong, Ann Gillis, Frank Gaby and Elisabeth Risdon. The film was released on March 1, 1941, by Universal Pictures.

== Synopsis ==
Tommy Thornton, a baseball player nicknamed Mr. Dynamite, goes to a carnival on Coney Island where he meets an attractive woman. Before long he is a drawn into a murder case and battle with a spy ring.

== Cast ==
- Lloyd Nolan as Tommy N. Thornton aka Mr. Dynamite
- Irene Hervey as Vicki Martin
- J. Carrol Naish as Professor
- Robert Armstrong as Paul
- Ann Gillis as Joey aka Abigail
- Frank Gaby as Valla
- Elisabeth Risdon as Achilles
- Shemp Howard as Abdullah
- Cliff Nazarro as Little Man
- Monte Brewer as Skinnay

== Bibliography ==
- Fetrow, Alan G. Feature Films, 1940-1949: a United States Filmography. McFarland, 1994.
