= Mr. District Attorney (1941 film) =

Crime drama by William Morgan

- Theatrical release poster
- Directed by: William Morgan
- Screenplay by: Karl Brown; Malcolm Stuart Boylan
- Produced by: Leonard Fields
- Starring: Dennis O'Keefe; Florence Rice; Peter Lorre; Stanley Ridges; Minor Watson; Charles Arnt
- Cinematography: Reggie Lanning
- Edited by: Edward Mann
- Music by: Mort Glickman; Paul Sawtell
- Production company: Republic Pictures
- Distributed by: Republic Pictures
- Release date: March 27, 1941
- Running time: 69 minutes
- Country: United States
- Language: English

Mr. District Attorney is a 1941 American comedy crime film directed by William Morgan and written by Karl Brown and Malcolm Stuart Boylan. The film was based on the long-running and popular radio series Mr. District Attorney. It stars Dennis O'Keefe, Florence Rice, Peter Lorre, Stanley Ridges, Minor Watson and Charles Arnt. The film was released on March 27, 1941, by Republic Pictures.

Two sequels followed: Mr. District Attorney in the Carter Case, later in the year, and Secrets of the Underground (1942) with different actors in the leading roles. A second adaptation with the same title was released in 1947.

== Plot ==
A well-connected and well-educated young lawyer, P. Cadwallader Jones, gets an appointment as deputy district attorney through the influence of his uncle. After embarrassing his superior in court, he is punished by being assigned a seemingly unsolvable cold case concerning a notorious embezzler who has been missing for four years. However, with the assistance of a streetwise young female journalist, he soon begins making inroads into the mystery.

== Cast ==
- Dennis O'Keefe as P. Cadwallader Jones
- Florence Rice as Terry Parker
- Peter Lorre as Paul Hyde
- Stanley Ridges as District Attorney Tom F. Winton
- Minor Watson as Arthur Barret
- Charles Arnt as Herman Winkle
- Joan Blair as Betty Paradise
- Charles Halton as Hazelton
- Alan Edwards as Grew
- George Watts as Judge White
- Sarah Edwards as Miss Petherby
- Helen Brown as Mrs. Paul Hyde

== See also ==
- Mr. District Attorney in the Carter Case (1941)
- Secrets of the Underground (1942)

== Bibliography ==
- Fetrow, Alan G. Feature Films, 1940-1949: a United States Filmography. McFarland, 1994.
