= Before I Hang =

1940 film by Nick Grinde

- Theatrical release poster
- Directed by: Nick Grinde (as Nick Grindé)
- Screenplay by: Robert Hardy Andrews (as Robert D. Andrews)
- Story by: Karl Brown; Robert Hardy Andrews (as Robert D. Andrews)
- Starring: Boris Karloff
- Cinematography: Benjamin H. Kline (as Benjamin Kline)
- Edited by: Charles Nelson
- Color process: Black and white
- Production company: Columbia Pictures
- Distributed by: Columbia Pictures
- Release date: September 17, 1940
- Running time: 62 minutes
- Country: United States
- Language: English

Before I Hang is a 1940 American horror film released by Columbia Pictures, starring Boris Karloff. The film was directed by Nick Grinde (under the working title The Wizard of Death) and was one of several films Karloff starred in under contract with Columbia.

== Plot ==
Dr. John Garth is on trial for murder after performing a mercy killing on an elderly friend. In the trial, he reveals that he had been researching a cure for aging but had not had time to perfect it before his friend's pain became unbearable. Despite his pleas for mercy, the judge sentences him to be hanged within one month.

As he awaits his execution, Dr. Garth is allowed to continue his experiments, thanks to support from the prison warden and another scientist who is interested in his research, Dr. Ralph Howard. Using the blood of a recently executed prisoner, they succeed in developing a serum that will reverse the effects of aging and decide to test it on Dr. Garth immediately prior to his execution. As he is being taken away to the gallows, however, the prison receives a call informing them that Dr. Garth's sentence has been commuted to life imprisonment. At the same moment, the serum's effect on his body causes Dr. Garth to collapse.

When Dr. Garth awakens in the prison medical ward, he discovers that the serum has reversed some of the effects of aging on his body, including the graying of his hair, the appearance of his face, and his physical fitness. Encouraged, he decides to perform another test of the serum, this time on Dr. Howard. As he is preparing Dr. Howard for injection, however, Dr. Garth is overcome by a sudden urge to kill induced by the presence of an executed murderer's blood in his system. After he strangles Dr. Howard, a wandering prisoner enters the room and, after a struggle, is also killed by Dr. Garth.

When the prison authorities discover Dr. Garth, who does not remember committing the murders, and the two bodies, they believe that the wandering prisoner killed Dr. Howard and attempted to kill Dr. Garth. As a result, Garth is labelled a hero and granted a full pardon. He returns home to live with his daughter, Martha, and continues his research on the anti-aging serum.

Wishing to test it further, he confronts three of his aging friends and requests that they be his test subjects. Initially they refuse, but one of them, Victor Sondini, later changes his mind after Dr. Garth pays him a visit. Just as he is about to administer the serum, Garth is again overcome by the impulses of the executed prisoner and strangles his friend. Finally beginning to realize what he has been doing, Garth visits one of his other friends, George Wharton, to confess his crimes and request that he be his final test subject before he turns himself in. Wharton attempts to call for help, but Garth kills him before he can do so.

As the bodies begin to pile up and Dr. Garth's behavior becomes more erratic, Martha begins to suspect that something is up and confronts her father. Garth begs her to leave as he continues to fight the impulses of the murderous blood, but she refuses and he comes at her. She faints and Dr. Garth flees. In the final scene, Dr. Garth, now being pursued by the police, approaches the prison where he had been incarcerated. The warden admits him, but Garth immediately makes aggressive movements toward the armed guard at the gate. The guard shoots him, and as he is dying the doctor admits that he committed suicide in order to prevent himself from killing anyone else.

== Cast ==
- Boris Karloff as Dr. John Garth
- Evelyn Keyes as Martha Garth
- Bruce Bennett as Dr. Paul Ames
- Edward Van Sloan as Dr. Ralph Howard
- Ben Taggart as Warden Thompson
- Pedro de Córdoba as Victor Sondini
- Wright Kramer as George Wharton
- Bertram Marburgh as Stephen Barclay
- Don Beddoe as Capt. McGraw
- Robert Fiske as District Attorney
- Kenneth MacDonald as Anson, Prison Guard
- Frank Richards as Otto Kron – Convict

== See also ==
- List of American films of 1940
- Boris Karloff filmography
