= 30 Minutes =

30 Minutes may refer to:

- 30 Minutes (TV program), a newsmagazine for children and young adults from the late-1970s, produced by CBS News
- "30 Minutes" (song), a 2002 song from the Russian group t.A.T.u.
- 30 Minutes (film), a Hindi film featuring Paintal

== See also ==
- Half an Hour, a 1920 film
