= Vanessa: Her Love Story =

1935 film by William K. Howard

- Directed by: William K. Howard
- Screenplay by: Lenore J. Coffee
- Based on: Vanessa (1933 novel) by Hugh Walpole
- Produced by: David O. Selznick
- Starring: Robert Montgomery; Helen Hayes; May Robson; Otto Kruger; Lewis Stone
- Cinematography: Ray June
- Edited by: Frank E. Hull
- Music by: Herbert Stothart
- Distributed by: Metro-Goldwyn-Mayer
- Release date: March 1, 1935
- Running time: 74 minutes
- Country: United States
- Language: English

Vanessa: Her Love Story is a 1935 American romantic drama film directed by William K. Howard, starring Robert Montgomery, Helen Hayes, and May Robson. Distributed by Metro-Goldwyn-Mayer, it was based on the 1933 novel Vanessa by Hugh Walpole. The film premiered on 1 March 1935.

== Cast ==
- Robert Montgomery as Benjamin Herries
- Helen Hayes as Vanessa Paris
- May Robson as Madame Judith Paris
- Otto Kruger as Ellis Herries
- Lewis Stone as Adam Paris
- Henry Stephenson as Barney Newmark
- Violet Kemble Cooper as Lady Herries
- Donald Crisp as George
- Agnes Anderson as Marion
- Lionel Belmore as Will Leathwaite
- George K. Arthur as Porter
- Jessie Ralph as Lady Mullion
- Lawrence Grant as Amery Herries
- Crauford Kent as Timothy
- Howard Leeds as Jamie
- Mary Gordon as Mrs. Leathwaite
- Ethel Griffies as Winifred Trent
- Elspeth Dudgeon as Vera Trent
