= Arms and the Woman =

1916 film by George Fitzmaurice

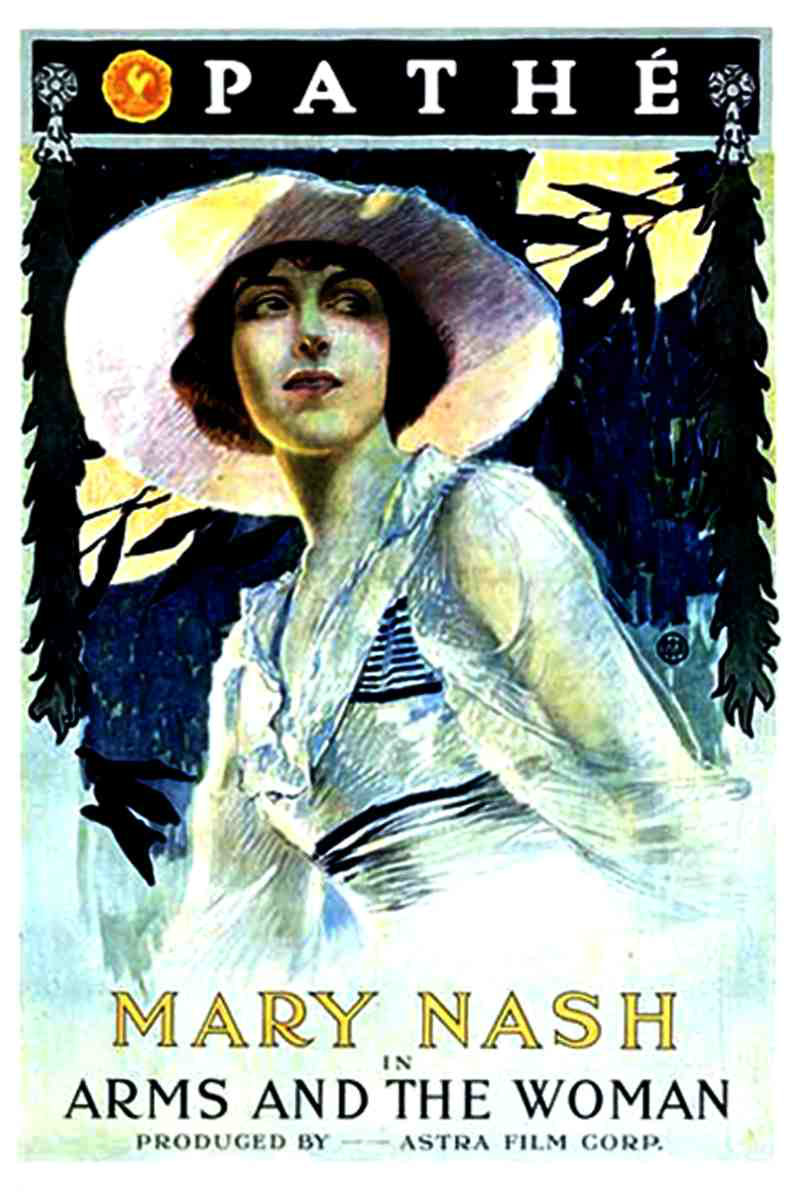
- Directed by: George Fitzmaurice
- Written by: Ouida Bergère
- Starring: Mary Nash; Lumsden Hare; H. Cooper Cliffe
- Cinematography: Arthur C. Miller
- Production company: Astra Film
- Distributed by: Pathé Exchange
- Release date: November 26, 1916
- Running time: 50 minutes
- Country: United States
- Languages: Silent; English intertitles

Arms and the Woman is a 1916 American silent drama film directed by George Fitzmaurice and starring Mary Nash, Lumsden Hare and H. Cooper Cliffe. It has been described as Edward G. Robinson's film debut, but the AFI Catalog of Feature Films states this claim is made only in some sources, as well as the film's sets having been designed by art director Anton Grot. It was shot in Jersey City, New Jersey.

== Cast ==
- Mary Nash as Rozika
- Lumsden Hare as David Fravoe
- H. Cooper Cliffe as Captain Halliday
- Robert Broderick as Marcus
- Rosalind Ivan as Marcus' Wife
- Carl Harbaugh as Carl
- Edward G. Robinson as Factory Worker (uncredited)

== Preservation ==
With no prints of Arms and the Woman located in any film archives, it is considered a lost film.

== Bibliography ==
- Robert Beck. The Edward G. Robinson Encyclopedia. McFarland, 2002.
