= The Face in the Moonlight =

1915 film

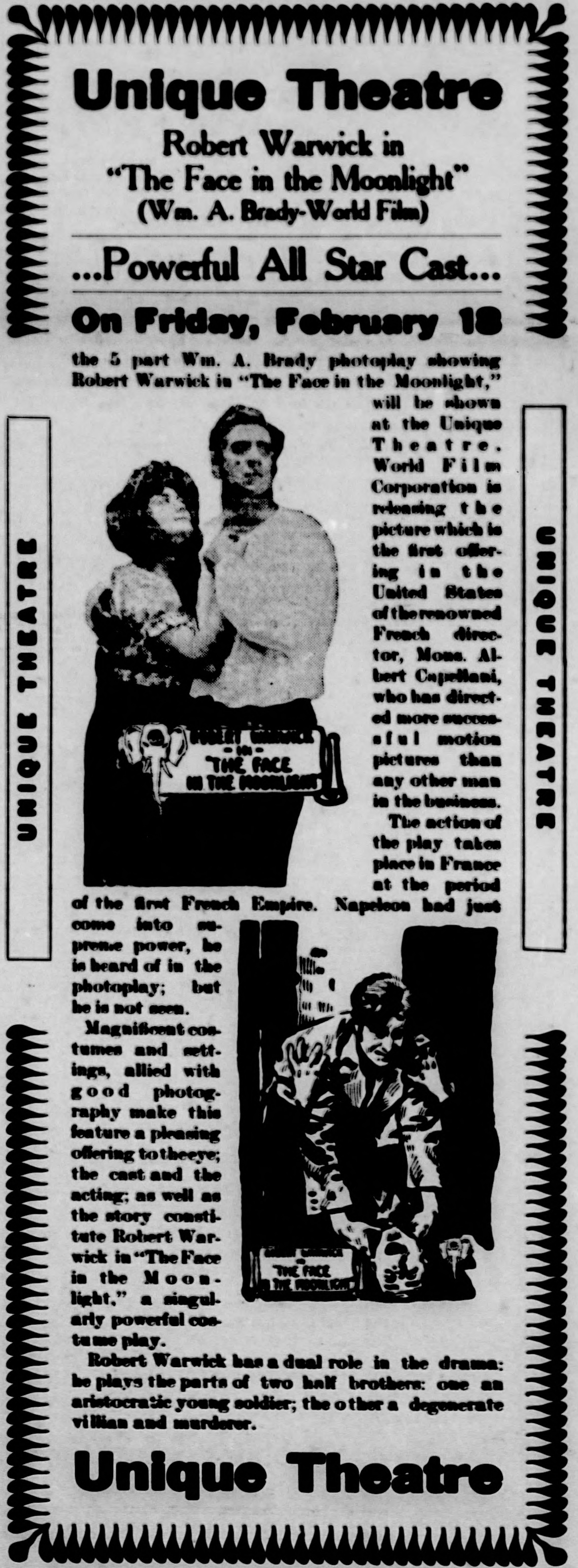
- Contemporary advertisement
- Directed by: Albert Capellani
- Written by: Charles Osborne (play)
- Produced by: William A. Brady
- Starring: Robert Warwick; Stella Archer; H. Cooper Cliffe
- Cinematography: Lucien N. Andriot
- Production company: William A. Brady Picture Plays
- Distributed by: World Film
- Release date: June 28, 1915
- Running time: 50 minutes
- Country: United States
- Languages: Silent; English intertitles

The Face in the Moonlight is a 1915 American silent historical drama film directed by Albert Capellani and starring Robert Warwick, Stella Archer, and H. Cooper Cliffe.

== Cast ==
- Robert Warwick as Victor / Rabat
- Stella Archer as Lucille
- H. Cooper Cliffe as Munier
- Montagu Love as Ambrose
- Dorothy Fairchild as Jeanne Mailloche
- George MacIntyre
- Elaine Hammerstein

== Bibliography ==
- Langman, Larry. Destination Hollywood: The Influence of Europeans on American Filmmaking. McFarland, 2000.
