= The Invisible Ray (1936 film) =

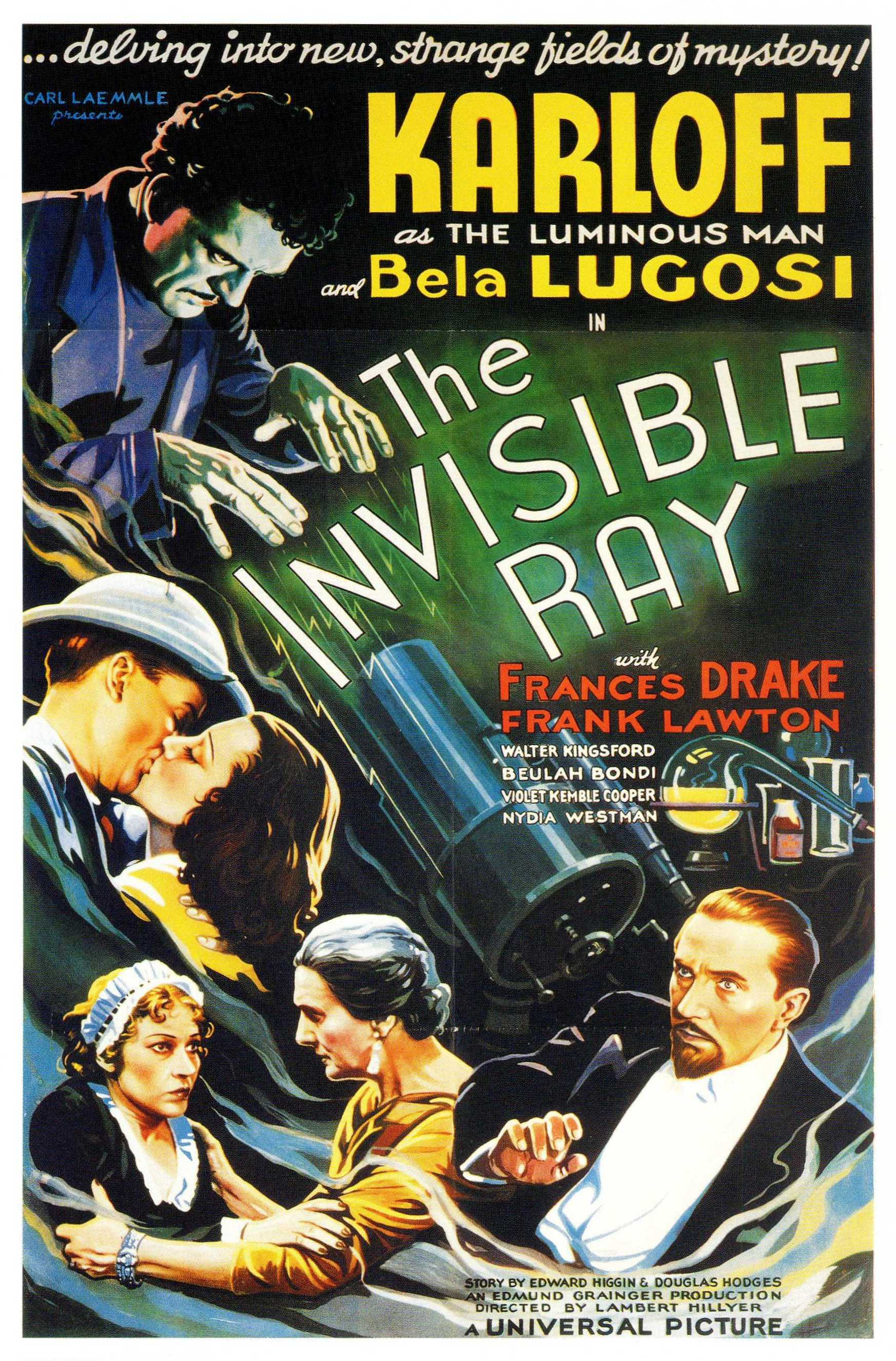
- Theatrical release poster by Karoly Grosz
- Directed by: Lambert Hillyer
- Screenplay by: John Colton
- Story by: Howard Higgin; Douglas Hodges
- Produced by: Edmund Grainger
- Starring: Boris Karloff; Bela Lugosi; Frances Drake; Frank Lawton
- Cinematography: George Robinson
- Edited by: Bernard Burton
- Music by: Franz Waxman
- Production company: Universal Pictures
- Distributed by: Universal Pictures
- Release date: 20 January 1936
- Running time: 79 minutes
- Country: United States
- Language: English

The Invisible Ray is a 1936 American science-fiction horror film directed by Lambert Hillyer. It stars Boris Karloff as Dr. Janos Rukh, a scientist who comes in contact with a meteorite composed of an element known as "Radium X". After exposure to its rays begins to make him glow in the dark, his touch becomes deadly, and he begins to be slowly driven mad. Alongside Karloff, the film's cast includes Bela Lugosi, Frances Drake, Frank Lawton, Walter Kingsford, Beulah Bondi, Violet Kemble Cooper, and Nydia Westman.

Prior to production, Universal Pictures was originally developing the film Bluebeard for Karloff and Lugosi. When that production did not start, Universal wanted a release by the end of 1935 with Karloff and Lugosi, and hired director Stuart Walker and screenwriter John Colton to make the film The Invisible Ray. As Walker was dissatisfied with Colton's script, he requested a three-day delay before production was set to begin and after being denied this, he left the production and was replaced with Lambert Hillyer. Hillyer began and completed the film over-budget and over the originally set production time.

== Plot ==
A visionary astronomer, Dr. Janos Rukh, has invented a telescope that can look far out into deep space, into the Andromeda Galaxy, and photograph light rays that will show the Earth's past. He has theorized about this being possible for some years, much to his discredit among his fellow scientist-colleagues. Looking at the remote past on a planetarium-like dome in his lab, two of those ardently skeptical scientists, Dr. Benet and Sir Francis Stevens, watch a large meteorite smash into the Earth a billion years ago, in what is now the continent of Africa. Amazed by Rukh's demonstration, the pair invite him to go on an expedition to locate the impact site.

Rukh finds the meteorite, but is exposed to its unknown radiation, now dubbed "Radium X". This causes him to glow in the dark and to make his mere touch instantaneously deadly to any living thing. The exposure also begins to warp his mind. Returning to the base camp, he entreats Dr. Benet to devise a means of neutralizing Radium X's poisoning effect. Benet develops a serum that holds the lethal element's toxicity at bay, but Rukh must take regular doses of the antidote or he will revert to being a luminous killing machine. Rukh returns to his jungle base and learns from Benet that this situation has been complicated by the romantic relationship between Rukh's wife, Diana, and Ronald Drake, the nephew of Lady Arabella Stevens, Dr. Stevens' wife.

Benet takes a piece of the meteorite back to Europe, where he modifies its effects to help people, including curing the blind. Working along similar lines, Rukh cures his mother's blindness, but in spite of her warning, he goes to Paris to confront Benet and the others. There, he pretends to acknowledge his wife's new relationship with Drake, but in reality, it is the first step in his plan for revenge. Rukh murders a Frenchman he closely resembles, making it appear that he has died and been rendered unrecognizable due to an accident with Radium X.

Believing the deception, Diana marries Ronald. Rukh now begins to use his radiation poisoning to kill off the expedition members. He marks each death by disintegrating a single statue on the exterior of a church across from where he is hiding. Each time, he focuses the radiation through a window using a raygun-like device. He manages to kill both Stevenses before the police realize what is happening. Dr. Benet helps them set a trap by convening a scientific conference at his home to discuss Radium X, but Rukh secretly gains access and kills Benet. He has saved his revenge on Ronald and Diana for last but finds himself unable to kill his former wife. This hesitation brings him to a confrontation with his mother, the most important woman in his life. She has foreseen her son's growing madness and smashes the last of his antidote bottles in order to stop him. As the Radium X begins to consume him from within, Rukh jumps from a window. He disappears in an explosive flame, having been vaporized before reaching the ground.

== Cast ==
Credits adapted from the book Universal Horrors:

- Boris Karloff as Dr. Janos Rukh
- Béla Lugosi as Dr. Felix Benet
- Frances Drake as Diana Rukh
- Frank Lawton as Ronald Drake
- Violet Kemble Cooper as Mother Rukh
- Walter Kingsford as Sir Francis Stevens
- Beulah Bondi as Lady Arabella Stevens
- Frank Reicher as Professor Meiklejohn
- Paul Weigel as Monsieur Noyer
- Georges Renavent as Chief of the Sûreté

Nydia Westman, though billed on the film's poster, appears in an uncredited role as Briggs.

== Production ==
Producer David Diamond, who teamed up actors Bela Lugosi and Boris Karloff for the 1935 film The Raven (1935), had plans to reunite the two actors in an upcoming Karloff film Bluebeard. The script for Bluebeard did not proceed as expected, leading the studio executives at Universal Pictures to put that film on hold and put Lugosi and Karloff in a different film. In August 1935, the studio announced that production on The Invisible Ray would commence with producer Edmund Grainger.

At the time of production, Universal Pictures was among reports that the studio was going to be sold. Pressure was put on the first initial director Stuart Walker who was not happy with the original script written by John Colton. Walker requested a three-day delay on the production to work on the script which was refused by Universal Studios which led to Walker leaving the production. Walker responded to trade papers on leaving the picture stating that he was enthusiastic about the film's story and the cast but he "did not feel that [he] could do the studio or [himself] justice under their conditions that came up suddenly". Walker declared that he "suggested that some other director would be better for the assignment. It was not a matter of "walking out...."" Lambert Hillyer ended up the director of the film. The film's score by Franz Waxman is predominantly original material, but includes cues from The Bride of Frankenstein (1935).

The film was initially given a budget of $166,875, an amount described in the book Universal Horrors as "a fairly lavish budget" for an "upper-class B" film. Filming began on September 17. Filming concluded on October 25 which was over-schedule and $68,000 over-budget.Walker later responded to this, retorting that "the director who did the picture started nine or ten days after I was ordered to start and finished 25 or more days after I was ordered to finish".

== Release ==
The Invisible Ray was distributed by Universal Pictures on January 20, 1936. Marguerite Tazelaar of the New York Herald Tribune commented on the audiences response to the film on their viewing, stating the audience "composed largely of men, gave to the picture their respectful attention, finding the laboratories especially absorbing, and the climax vastly exciting".

The film was released on DVD as part of the Bela Lugosi Collection in 2005 along with Murders in the Rue Morgue (1932), The Black Cat (1934), The Raven (1935), and Black Friday (1940). The film was released on Blu-ray by Shout Factory as part of their "Universal Horror Collection: Vol 1" which included The Black Cat, The Raven, and Black Friday.

== Reception ==
From contemporary reviews, "Char." of Variety declared that the film was not "as blood-curdling to the point achieved in some Hollywoodian efforts, but it is different and fairly entertaining". Frank Nugent of The New York Times stated that Universal had "made its newest penny dreadful with technical ingenuity and the pious hope of frightening the children... Boo right back at you, Mr. Laemmle!"

From retrospective reviews, Kevin Thomas of The Los Angeles Times stated in 2005 that the film was "[s]ometimes amusingly dated" as well as that it was "also surprisingly poignant, building to a tense and dramatic climax... [A] handsome, ambitious production in which some stilted acting and dialogue add to, rather than detract from the fun".

== Legacy ==
Footage of The Invisible Ray, specifically the scenes where a scientist descends into a fiery pit, was re-used in the Universal Pictures film serial The Phantom Creeps.

== See also ==
- Boris Karloff filmography
- Bela Lugosi filmography
