= The Black Cat (1934 film) =

1934 film by Edgar G. Ulmer

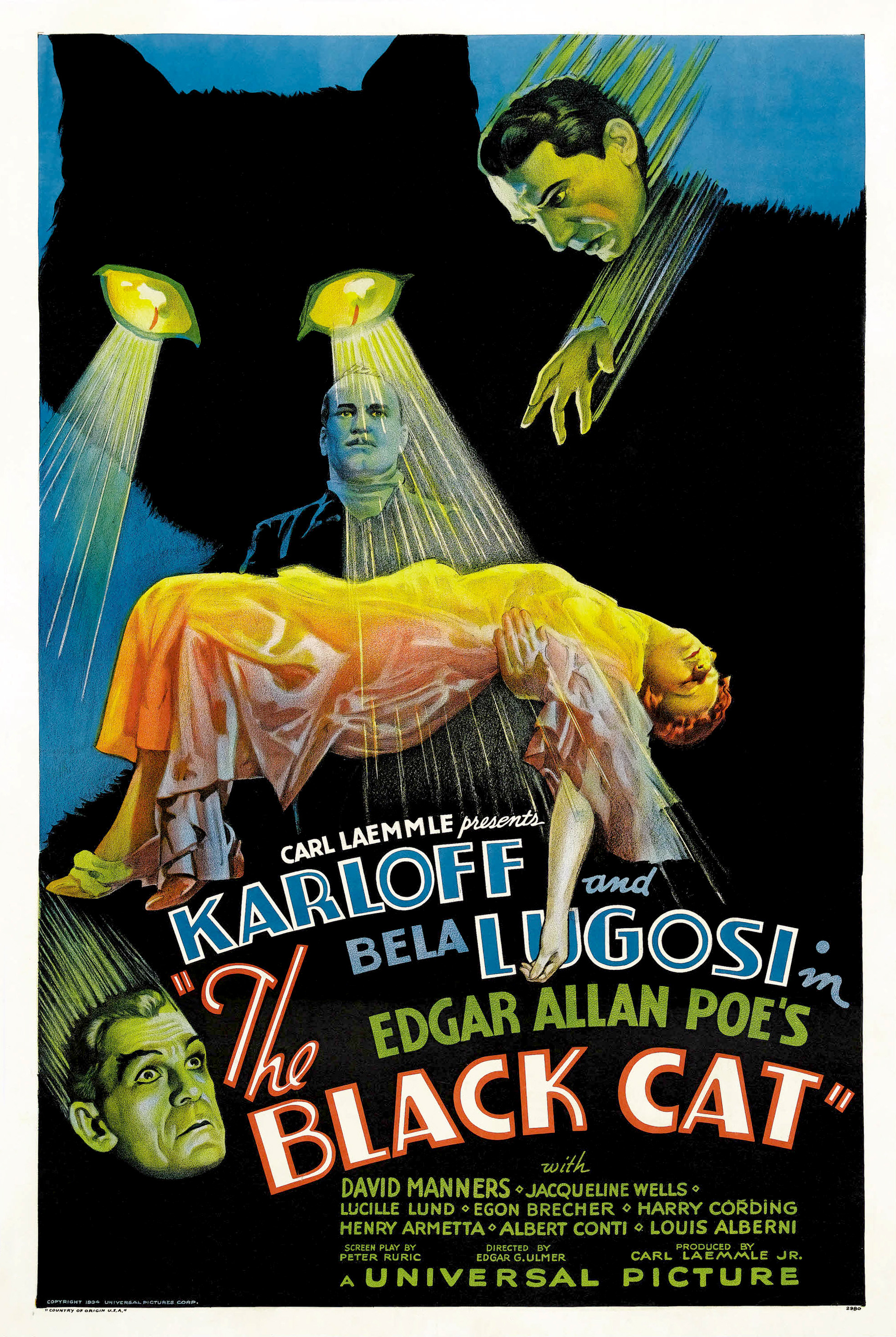
- Theatrical release poster
- Directed by: Edgar G. Ulmer
- Screenplay by: Peter Ruric
- Story by: Edgar G. Ulmer; Peter Ruric
- Based on: The Black Cat; 1843 short story by Edgar Allan Poe ("suggested by" in name only)
- Produced by: Carl Laemmle Jr.; E. M. Asher
- Starring: Boris Karloff; Béla Lugosi
- Cinematography: John J. Mescall
- Edited by: Ray Curtiss
- Music by: Heinz Roemheld
- Production company: Universal Pictures
- Distributed by: Universal Pictures
- Release dates: May 7, 1934 (US); May 18, 1934 (NYC)
- Running time: 66 minutes
- Country: United States
- Language: English
- Budget: $95,745.31
- Box office: $236,000

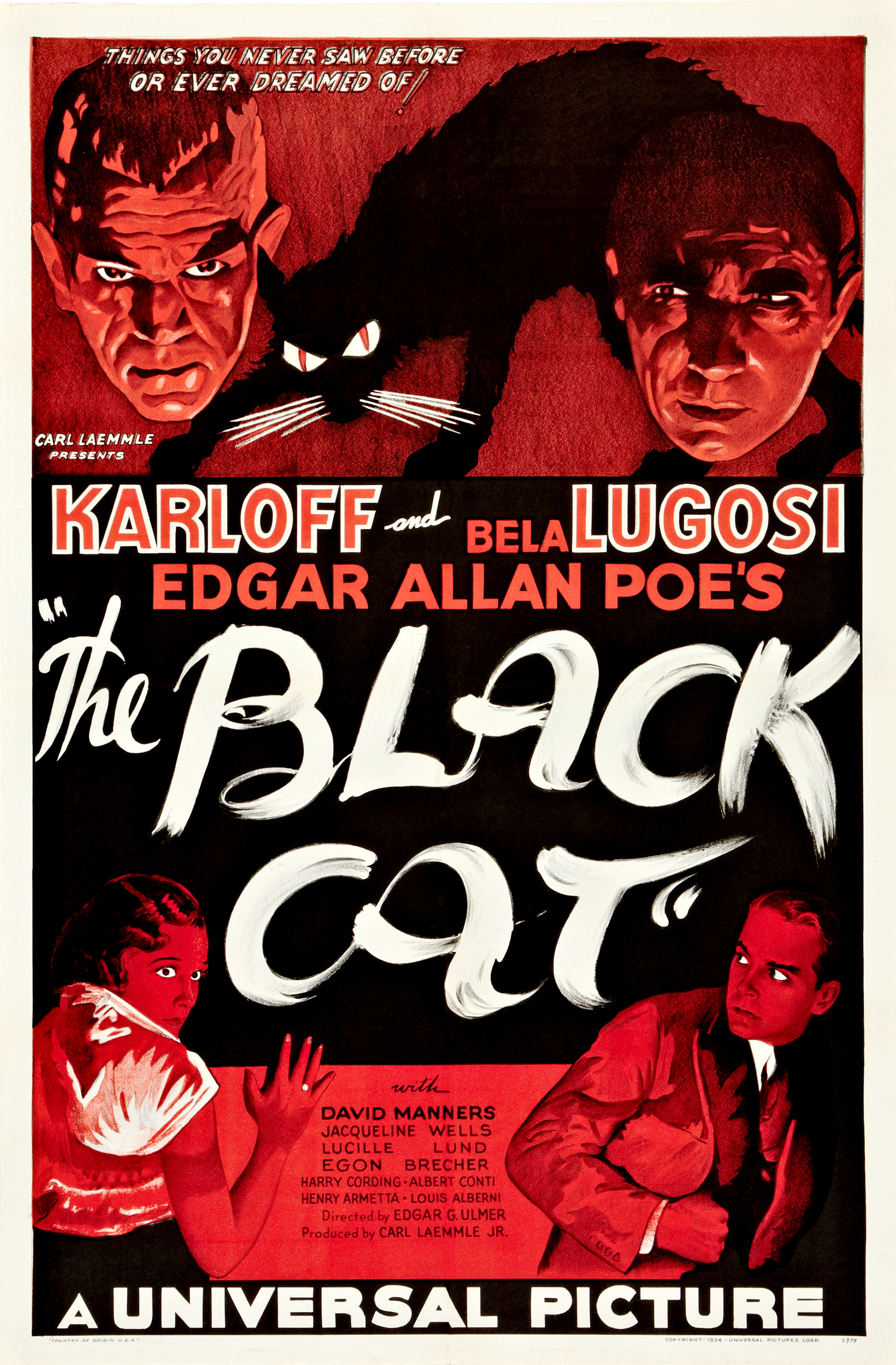
Alternate theatrical release poster

The Black Cat is a 1934 American pre-Code horror film directed by Edgar G. Ulmer and starring Boris Karloff and Béla Lugosi. It was Universal Pictures' biggest box office hit of the year, and was the first of eight films (six of which were produced by Universal) to feature both Karloff and Lugosi. In 1941, Lugosi appeared in a comedy horror mystery film with the same title, which was also named after and ostensibly "suggested by" Edgar Allan Poe's 1843 short story.

The film was among the earlier movies with an almost continuous music score, and it helped to create and popularize the psychological horror subgenre by emphasizing atmosphere, eerie sounds, the darker side of the human psyche, and emotions like fear and guilt to deliver its scares.

== Plot ==
On their honeymoon in Hungary, American mystery novelist Peter Alison and his new wife Joan are told that, due to a mix-up, they must share a train compartment with Dr. Vitus Werdegast, a Hungarian psychiatrist, who says he is traveling to see an old friend. As the night wears on, the couple learn that Werdegast left home 18 years earlier to fight in World War I and has not seen his wife since, as he spent the last 15 years in an infamous prison camp in Siberia.

In the dark and rain, Peter, Joan, Werdegast, and Thamal, Werdegast's servant, transfer to a small bus. When they are near Werdegast's destination, the remote home that Austrian architect Hjalmar Poelzig built upon the ruins of Fort Marmorus, the driver of the bus loses control and drives off the road. He is killed in the crash and Joan is injured, but Peter, Werdegast, and Thamal are well enough to take her to Poelzig's house.

After treating Joan's injury, Werdegast and Poelzig go to speak privately. Werdegast says he has come for revenge, as he knows Poelzig betrayed Fort Marmorus, which Poelzig commanded, to the Russians, resulting in the deaths of thousands of Austro-Hungarian soldiers and Werdegast's imprisonment, and stole his wife and daughter, both named Karen, after telling them he was dead. As Peter enters and attempts to intervene, Poelzig's black cat walks by and Werdegast, who suffers from severe ailurophobia, kills it with a thrown knife. Just then, Joan enters, behaving erratically, possibly because of an injection of a narcotic that Werdegast had given her.

The guests go to their rooms, and Poelzig, carrying a black cat, surveys a "collection" of preserved dead women on display in glass cases in his basement. He brings Werdegast to see one of the women, who Werdegast recognizes as his wife, and says she died of pneumonia two years after the war, also revealing that the younger Karen is also dead. Heartbroken, Werdegast almost shoots Poelzig, but he is spooked by the cat, and Poelzig says they should wait to have their confrontation until after the Alisons leave. The men part, and Poelzig joins Werdegast's daughter Karen, who is alive and is his wife, in bed. Instructing her to not leave the room the next day, he opens a book titled The Rites of Lucifer.

In the morning, Joan awakens feeling well, and she and Peter hope to leave that day. Werdegast confronts Poelzig about how he is looking at Joan, and Poelzig mentions a ceremony scheduled for that night and admits he intends for her to stay. He and Werdegast play a game of chess to decide the fate of the Alisons, and, after losing, Werdegast has Thamal help place Peter in a cell in the basement and lock Joan in her room. Karen later stumbles upon Joan, who tells Karen that Werdegast is still alive, but the women are caught by Poelzig. He and Karen exit and Joan hears Karen scream.

That night, Poelzig's cult gathers at his house. Joan is brought in and, as Poelzig approaches her, a female acolyte sees something which causes her to scream and faint. Taking advantage of the distraction, Werdegast and Thamal grab Joan and carry her away. Thamal is shot by Poelzig's servant before dispatching him, and Werdegast urges Joan to forget about Peter and escape. She tells him that his daughter is alive and married to Poelzig, and he rushes off, finding Karen dead on a slab. Poelzig enters and the adversaries fight. A dying Thamal helps Werdegast, overpowers Poelzig and shackles him to his embalming rack, and Werdegast begins to skin Poelzig alive.

Peter escapes from his cell and looks for Joan. He finds Werdegast crouching next to her to help tear a key from Thamal's dead hand, but thinks Werdegast is attacking her, so he shoots the psychiatrist. Fatally wounded, Werdegast tells the couple to leave and ignites demolition charges left over from when the house was a military installation, destroying the building and eradicating Poelzig's cult.

Having just experienced an unbelievable adventure, on the trip home, Peter and Joan read a review of his latest novel, which complains that the plot is too far-fetched.

== Cast ==
- Boris Karloff (credited as Karloff) as Hjalmar Poelzig, an architect and former friend of Werdegast who is secretly keeping Karen and her daughter within his house.
- Béla Lugosi as Dr. Vitus Werdegast, a doctor and WWI veteran who returns to find his wife and faces off against Poelzig.
- David Manners as Peter Alison, a writer and Joan's Husband
- Jacqueline Wells (later known as Julie Bishop) as Joan Alison, Peter's wife who is captured by Poelzig.
- Lucille Lund as Karen Poelzig (née Werdegast), Poelzig's wife and Werdegast's daughter (Lund also plays the corpse of Karen's mother, who was also named Karen)
- Egon Brecher as The Majordomo, Poelzig's servant
- Harry Cording as Thamal, Werdegast's servant
- Henry Armetta as The Sergeant who investigates the bus crash
- Albert Conti as The Lieutenant who investigates the bus crash
- George Davis as the bus driver for Hotel Hungaria—Gömbös (uncredited)
- Anna Duncan as Poelzig's maid (uncredited)
- John Carradine as the cult member who plays the organ (uncredited)

== Production ==
Although Edgar Allan Poe is given a "suggested by" credit, the film has little to do with his 1843 short story "The Black Cat". Instead, director Edgar G. Ulmer and writer Peter Ruric (better known as pulp writer "Paul Cain") came up with the story, which exploits what was a sudden public interest in psychiatry, and Ruric wrote the screenplay. The 1941 film of the same name starring Basil Rathbone, which purports to be "suggested by" the same Poe story, bears little relation to this film, other than the presence of Lugosi.

The character of Hjalmar Poelzig drew inspiration from the life of occultist Aleister Crowley, while the name "Poelzig" was borrowed from architect Hans Poelzig, whom Ulmer claimed to have worked with on the sets for Paul Wegener's silent film The Golem (1920).

A score consisting of excerpts from classical pieces composed by Liszt, Tchaikovsky, Chopin, and others runs through nearly 80% of the film. The soundtrack was compiled by Heinz Roemheld.

== Release ==
As part of the boom in horror sound films following the release of Dracula and Frankenstein in 1931, The Black Cat was the biggest box-office hit of 1934 for Universal Pictures, and it was the first of eight films (six of which were produced by Universal) to feature both Béla Lugosi and Boris Karloff. The film was released in UK cinemas under the title House of Doom. The film's copyright was renewed in 1961. (Note: Under R287598)

=== Home media ===
In 2005, the film was released on DVD as part of the Bela Lugosi Collection, along with Murders in the Rue Morgue (1932), The Raven (1935), The Invisible Ray (1936), and Black Friday (1940). Eureka Entertainment released the film on Blu-ray in July 2020 as part of their Masters of Cinema collection in the "Three Edgar Allan Poe Adaptations Starring Bela Lugosi" set, which also included Murders in the Rue Morgue and The Raven.

== Critical reception ==
Upon the film's original release, The New York Times reviewer wrote: "The Black Cat is more foolish than horrible. The story and dialogue pile the agony on too thick to give the audience a reasonable scare."

The film's critical reputation has grown over time, however, and on review aggregator website Rotten Tomatoes, it has an 91% approval rating based on 34 reviews, with an average score of 7.7/10; the site's "critics consensus" reads: "Making the most of its Karloff-Lugosi star pairing and loads of creepy atmosphere, The Black Cat is an early classic in the Universal monster movie library." In 2007, the British critic Philip French called the film "the first (and best) of seven Karloff/Lugosi joint appearances. The movie unfolds like a nightmare that involves necrophilia, ailurophobia, drugs, a deadly game of chess, torture, flaying, and a black mass with a human sacrifice. This bizarre, utterly irrational masterpiece, lasting little more than an hour, has images that bury themselves in the mind."

In the 2010s, Time Out polled a group of authors, directors, actors, and critics who had worked in the horror genre, and The Black Cat was voted the 89th best horror film of all time. The film was also ranked #68 on Bravo's "100 Scariest Movie Moments" for the "skinning" scene. Cramps-guitarist and noted horror aficionado Poison Ivy has said of this scene: "Karloff gets skinned alive at the end, but they show the shadow of it and somehow that's more gruesome."

== In popular culture ==
An excerpt from the scene in which Werdegast utters the line, "Supernatural, perhaps. Baloney, perhaps not." appears in the Monkees' 1968 feature film Head and on that film's subsequent soundtrack album. The line also appears in comedian Sinbad's 1990 comedy special Brain Damaged, as well as Deee-Lite's song "E.S.P." from their 1990 album World Clique. The quote also appears in Thomas Pynchon's 2025 book Shadow Ticket.

== See also ==
- Boris Karloff filmography
- Bela Lugosi filmography
