= Violet Kemble-Cooper =

English-American actress

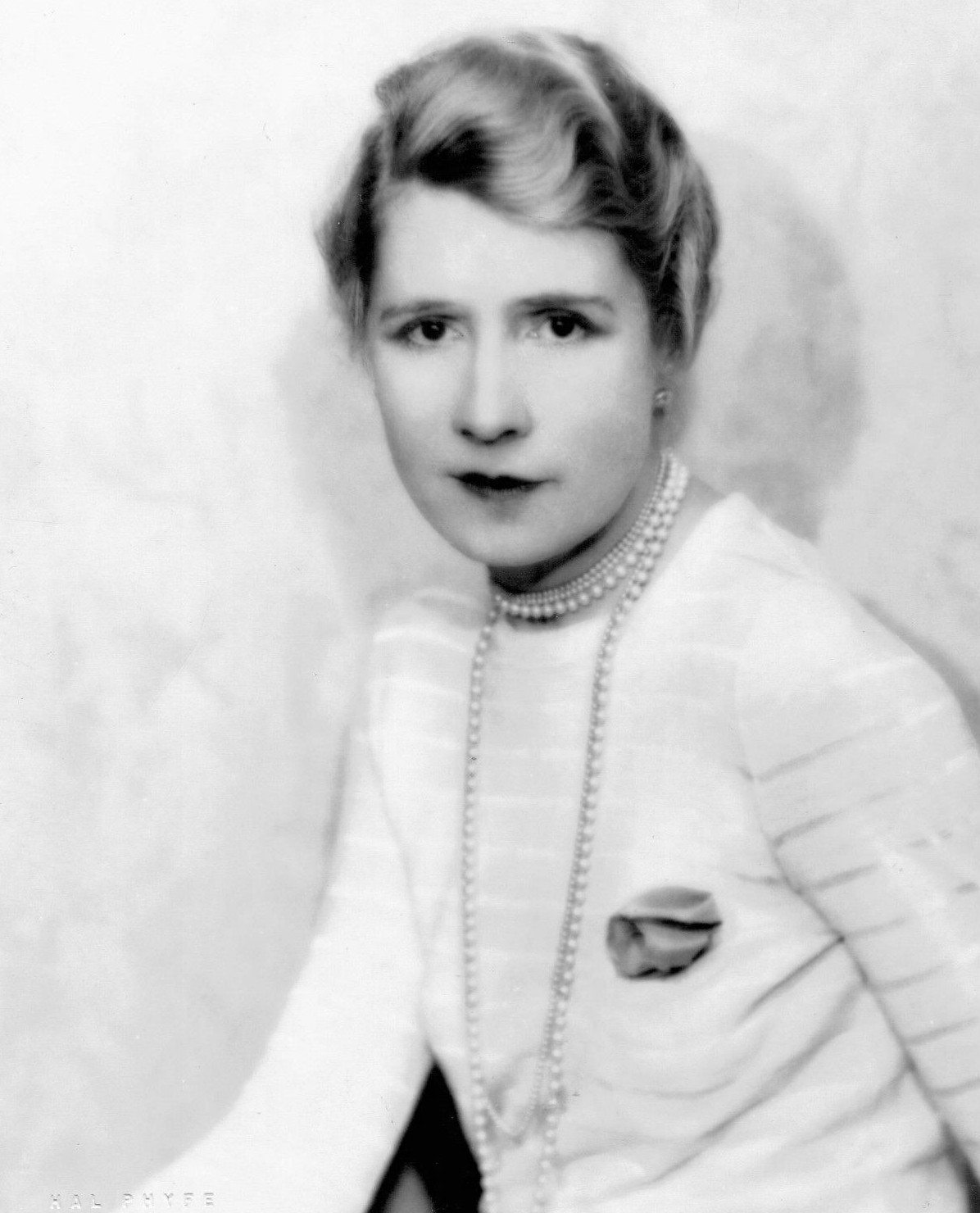
- Kemble-Cooper in 1930
- Born: Violet Kemble-Cooper; 12 December 1886; London, England
- Died: 17 August 1961 (aged 74); Hollywood, California, U.S.
- Occupation: Actress
- Years active: 1905–1936
- Spouse: Walter Ferris
- Relatives: Lillian Kemble-Cooper (sister); H. Cooper Cliffe (uncle)

Violet Kemble-Cooper (12 December 1886 – 17 August 1961) was an English-American actress who appeared on stage and in Hollywood film.

== Early life ==
Born in London, she was a descendant from a well-known theatrical family, the Kemble family. Her father was actor Frank Kemble-Cooper. Her sisters Lillian and Greta and her brother Anthony were actors as well. Her uncle was thespian H. Cooper Cliffe.

== Career ==
She made her first stage appearance in 1905 in her native England in a production of Charley's Aunt. By 1912 she was in America, touring and in stock plays with actors including Blanche Bates and Laurette Taylor. She appeared with John and Ethel Barrymore in Claire de Lune on Broadway in 1921.

== Film ==
As Violet spent her formative years acting in the theatre, she never appeared in the genre of silent films. She appeared in talkies, beginning with the Constance Bennett film Our Betters (1933). She appeared in several more films, including the evil spinster Miss Murdstone in the Dickens film adaption David Copperfield (1935) and Boris Karloff's mother in the horror film The Invisible Ray (1936). Kemble-Cooper's last movie was the MGM costumer Romeo and Juliet (1936), where she portrayed Lady Capulet.

== Personal life and death ==
She died of a stroke and Parkinson's disease in California in 1961, aged 74.

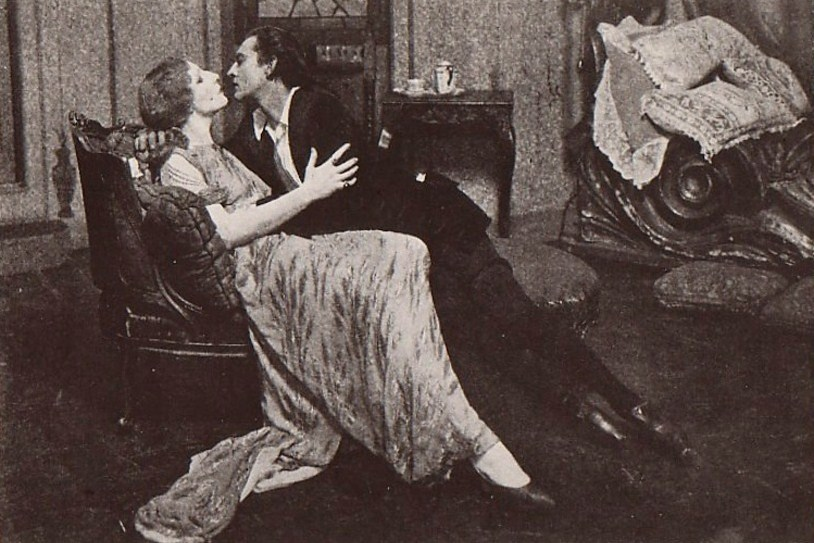
in the play Clair de Lune (1921) with John Barrymore

== Filmography ==
Year	Title	Role	Notes
1933	Our Betters	Duchess	
1933	The Invisible Man	Woman	uncredited
1934	The Fountain	Baroness Van leyden	
1935	David Copperfield	Jane Murdstone	
1935	Vanessa: Her Love Story	Lady Herries	
1935	Cardinal Richelieu	Queen Marie	
1936	The Invisible Ray	Mother Rukh	
1936	Romeo and Juliet	Lady Capulet	
