= Lillian Kemble-Cooper =

English-American actress

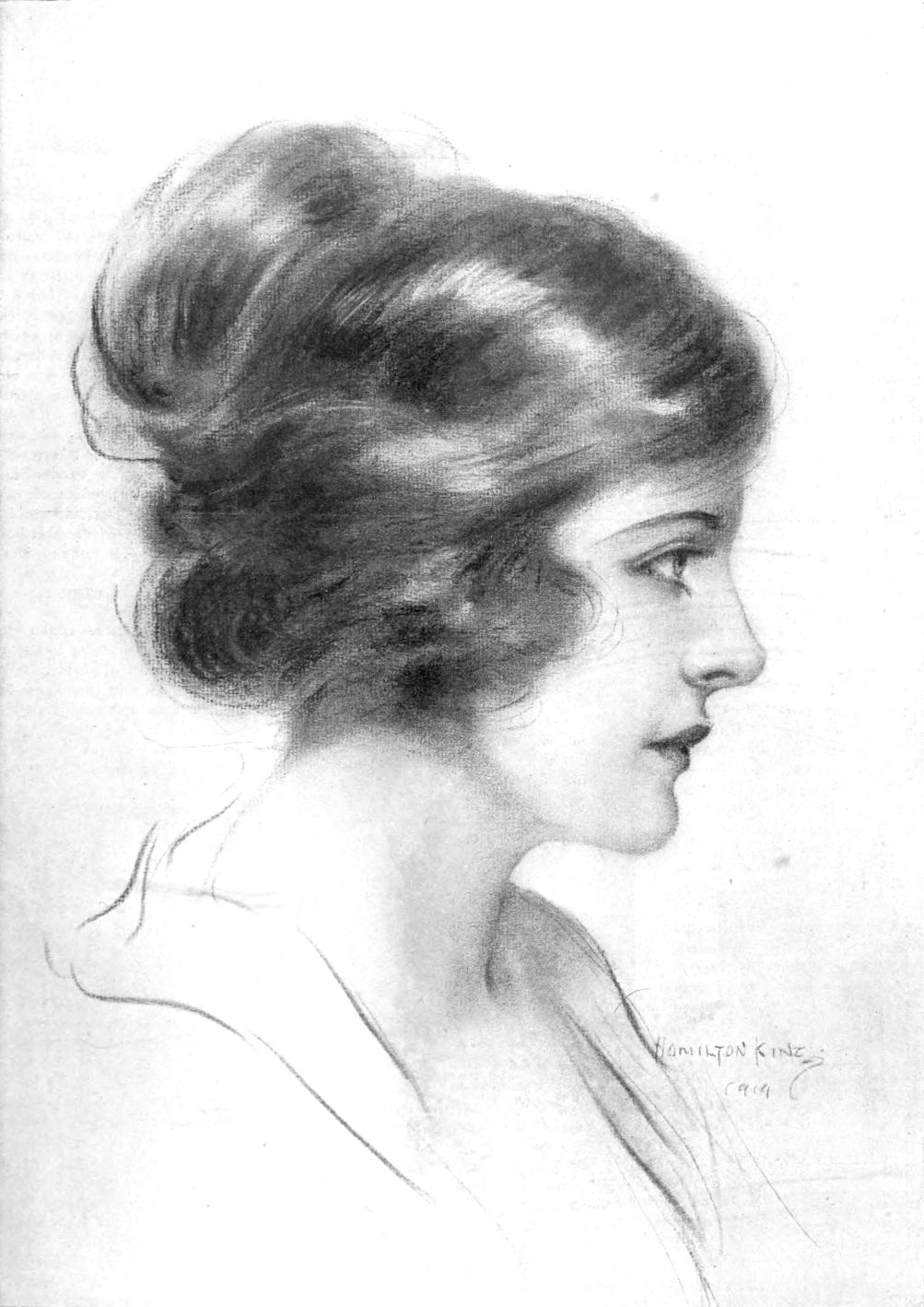
- Born: 21 March 1892; London, England
- Died: 4 May 1977 (aged 85); Los Angeles, California, U.S.
- Resting place: Hollywood Forever Cemetery
- Years active: 1906–1964
- Spouse(s): Louis Bernheimer (m. 19??; div. 19??) Guy Bates Post (m. 1936; died 1968)
- Relatives: Violet Kemble-Cooper (sister); H. Cooper Cliffe (uncle) Alice May Ellie Mary Taunton (mother) Frank Clifford Cooper (father)

Lillian Kemble-Cooper (21 March 1892 – 4 May 1977) was an English-American actress who had a successful career on Broadway and in Hollywood film.

== Biography ==
=== Early life ===
Lillian Kemble-Cooper was a member of the Kemble family from England. She was born as a daughter of stage actor Frank Kemble-Cooper. Her younger brother Anthony Kemble-Cooper (1904–2000) and her elder sister Violet Kemble-Cooper also worked as actors.

=== Career ===
Kemble-Cooper first stage appearance was as a member of the chorus in a September, 1914, production of The Chocolate Soldier at the Lyric Theatre, London. She soon moved to the United States, where she appeared in several Broadway productions. In 1919, she appeared in the original Hitchy-Koo. Later in her career, she became a film actress and appeared in about 20 films, mostly in minor supporting roles. In Hollywood, Kemble-Cooper portrayed mostly aristocrats, spinsters and servants. She is perhaps best-remembered for her short appearance as Bonnie Blue Butler's nurse in London in Gone with the Wind.

=== Personal life and death ===
In 1923 Kemble-Cooper married former World War I pilot and writer Louis G. Bernheimer, who died in 1930. Her second husband was actor Guy Bates Post, and this marriage lasted for over 30 years until his death in 1968.

Kemble died on 4 May 1977 in Los Angeles. She was buried at the Hollywood Forever Cemetery.

== Selected filmography ==
- I Like Your Nerve (1931) - Condesa Vecchio (uncredited)
- Personal Maid's Secret (1935) - Mrs. Palmer (uncredited)
- Three Live Ghosts (1936) - Lady Brockton
- The White Angel (1936) - Parthenope 'Parthe' Nightingale
- A Woman Rebels (1936) - Lady Rinlake (uncredited)
- Ready, Willing, and Able (1937) - Mrs. Buffington (Credits) / Bloomington (in Film)
- We Are Not Alone (1939) - Mrs. Stacey (uncredited)
- Gone with the Wind (1939) - Bonnie's Nurse in London
- Lady with Red Hair (1940) - London Party Guest (uncredited)
- Rage in Heaven (1941) - Nurse (uncredited)
- A Woman's Face (1941) - Nurse (uncredited)
- So Big (1953) - Miss Fister
- Moonfleet (1955) - Mary Hicks (uncredited)
- The King's Thief (1955) - Mrs. Fell
- Alfred Hitchcock Presents (1956) (Season 1 Episode 23: "Back for Christmas") as Mrs. Sinclair
- Gaby (1956) - Mrs. Edward (uncredited)
- D-Day the Sixth of June (1956) - British Nurse (uncredited)
- My Fair Lady (1964) - Lady Ambassador (uncredited)
