= The Woman God Changed =

1921 film

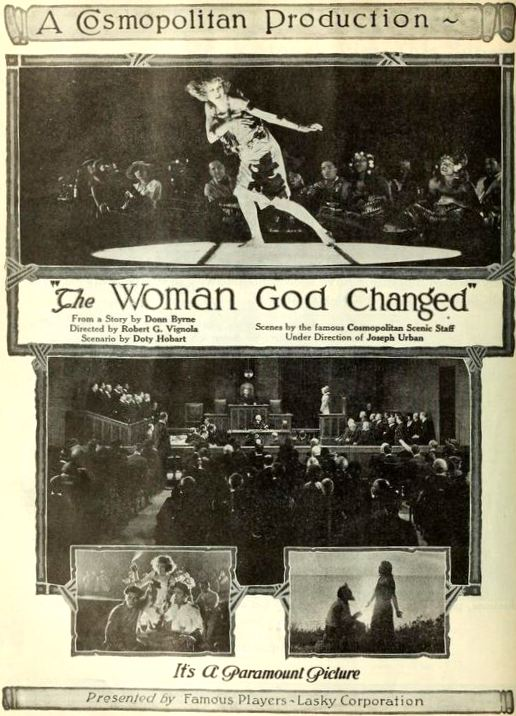
- Advertisement for film
- Directed by: Robert G. Vignola
- Written by: Brian Oswald Donn-Byrne
- Screenplay by: Doty Hobart
- Starring: Seena Owen; E.K. Lincoln; Henry Sedley; Lillian Walker; H. Cooper Cliffe; Paul Nicholson
- Cinematography: Al Liguori
- Production company: Cosmopolitan Productions
- Distributed by: Paramount Pictures
- Release date: July 3, 1921
- Running time: 70 minutes
- Country: United States
- Language: Silent (English intertitles)

The Woman God Changed is a 1921 American silent drama film directed by Robert G. Vignola and written by Brian Oswald Donn-Byrne and Doty Hobart. The film stars Seena Owen, E.K. Lincoln, Henry Sedley, Lillian Walker, H. Cooper Cliffe and Paul Nicholson. The film was released on July 3, 1921, by Paramount Pictures.

== Cast ==
- Seena Owen as Anna Janssen
- E.K. Lincoln as Thomas McCarthy
- Henry Sedley as Alastair De Vries
- Lillian Walker as Lilly
- H. Cooper Cliffe as Donogan
- Paul Nicholson as District Attorney
- Joseph W. Smiley as Police Commissioner

== Preservation status ==
The film is preserved minus a reel in the Library of Congress(Packard Campus for Audio-Visual Conservation) collection.
