= Black Friday (1940 film) =

1940 American science fiction film directed by Arthur Lubin

- Directed by: Arthur Lubin
- Screenplay by: Curt Siodmak (as Kurt Siodmak); Eric Taylor
- Starring: Boris Karloff; Bela Lugosi; Stanley Ridges; Anne Nagel; Anne Gwynne
- Cinematography: Elwood Bredell
- Edited by: Philip Cahn
- Production company: Universal Pictures
- Distributed by: Universal Pictures
- Release dates: February 29, 1940 (Chicago); April 12, 1940 (United States)
- Running time: 70 minutes
- Country: United States
- Language: English
- Budget: $125,750

Black Friday is a 1940 American science fiction horror gangster film starring Boris Karloff and Bela Lugosi.

Screenwriter Curt Siodmak would revisit this theme again in Donovan's Brain (1953) and Hauser's Memory (1970).

== Plot ==
Bookish college professor George Kingsley is accidentally run down by gangster Red Cannon, who was fleeing from four members of his former gang attempting to kill him. Cannon is crippled by the accident while Kingsley suffers life-threatening brain trauma. Kingsley's friend Dr. Ernest Sovac implants part of Cannon's brain into Kingsley to save his life. Cannon dies as a result, while Kingsley recovers but at times behaves like Cannon. Sovac is intrigued, not only because this suggests his procedure can be used to preserve a person's life indefinitely, but because Cannon has hidden $500,000 somewhere in New York City. Sovac persuades Kingsley to take a vacation in New York, ostensibly as a curative change of pace for his irritable mood; Sovac hopes this will revive Cannon's memory so that Kingsley will lead him to the fortune which he hopes to spend on a laboratory.

Sovac uses hypnosis to fully awaken the Cannon persona, which is accompanied by a change in physical appearance so dramatic that he becomes unrecognizable as either Kingsley or Cannon, and fills Cannon in on what happened since his accident. Cannon exploits the natural disguise of Kingsley's body to begin hunting down his former gang members and strangling them to death. Whenever he returns to the Kingsley persona, he has no memory of his doings as Cannon and is extremely tired. Police are baffled as to the identity of the "gangster killer", while his gang members assume he is an associate to whom Cannon passed on his knowledge before he died.

Frustrated by Cannon's lack of interest in his hidden stash, Sovac threatens to use hypnosis to make the Kingsley persona permanently dominant unless Cannon does as he says. Kingsley's wife Margaret and Sovac's daughter Jean, concerned for Kingsley, come to New York. Jean recognizes Kingsley in his Cannon persona and draws an explanation out of Sovac. She entreats him to allow Kingsley to return home and recover. Sovac relents, promising to return Kingsley in the morning. That night Cannon goes to retrieve the stash. The remaining former gang members, tipped off by Cannon's lover Sunny, follow him to the stash to take it from him. Cannon fights them off and strangles them both, along with Sunny. Cannon reverts to the Kingsley persona and returns to Sovac with the box, not knowing it contains Cannon's fortune.

Upon returning home Kingsley returns to normal, the Cannon persona no longer manifesting even as the earlier fits of irritability. However, while Kingsley is teaching a class, a police siren reawakens the Cannon persona. Cannon heads to the Sovac home in search of the money and attempts to murder Jean. Sovac shoots him dead.

Sovac is executed for murdering Kingsley. Before stepping into the electric chair he gives notes on his brain transplant procedure to a reporter, in the hopes that his work may one day be put to better use.

== Cast ==
- Boris Karloff as Dr. Ernest Sovac
- Stanley Ridges as Professor George Kingsley/Red Cannon
- Bela Lugosi as Eric Marnay
- Anne Nagel as Sunny Rogers
- Anne Gwynne as Jean Sovac
- Virginia Brissac as Mrs. Margaret Kingsley
- Edmund MacDonald as Frank Miller
- Paul Fix as William Kane
- Murray Alper as Bellhop
- Gonzalo Meroño as Richard Steward

== Production ==
The original story treatment was titled Friday the Thirteenth before being changed to Black Friday. In January 1939, Universal announced that Willis Cooper was working on the script, with Bela Lugosi and Boris Karloff probably to star. In August, Curt Siodmak and Eric Taylor were assigned to write the script.

Universal cast Lugosi as the doctor and Karloff as the professor. For unknown reasons, Karloff insisted on playing the doctor. Rather than a straight switch though, Lugosi was given the minor role of another gangster, while character actor Stanley Ridges was brought in to play the professor. In later years, writer Curt Siodmak claimed Karloff felt he was not a good enough actor to play the dual role of the kindly professor-turned-murderous gangster, but it is more likely that his appearance and voice could not be changed completely enough to make the switch convincing. (Karloff played a dual role in the 1935 film The Black Room but the two characters were identical twins. He finally played a character with a second, murderous persona that has a dramatically different appearance in the 1958 film The Haunted Strangler.)

The film provided a rare opportunity for Ridges.

By December, the title had changed to Black Friday. Arthur Lubin reportedly got the job of directing on the strength of his work on The Big Guy. Filming started 27 December 1939.

During filming, Manley Hall reportedly hypnotised Lugosi on set.

== Release ==
Black Friday had its world premiere in Chicago on February 29, 1940. It was released theatrically April 12, 1940 where it was distributed by Universal Pictures.

=== Criticism ===
The New York Times at the time of release stated: "Lugosi's terrifying talents are wasted... but Karloff is in exquisite artistic form... good holiday fun."

Diabolique magazine in 2019 described it as "Lubin's first film to have any kind of lasting legacy... because it features both Boris Karloff and Bela Lugosi, though neither share a scene together. It's a sort of gangster-horror film that involves a brain transplant (Curt Siodmak, who worked on the script, loved brain transplants). Stanley Ridges plays a part clearly meant for Karloff with Karloff playing a role that should have been played by Lugosi and Lugosi being wasted in a part that could have been played by anyone. The film is no classic but it is crisp and no-nonsense, taking advantage of Universal's studio resources, with excellent tempo; Joe Dante later commented it was more like a Warner Bros film in that respect than a Universal one, a judgement that could be made of many Lubin movies from this period."

=== Home media ===
Black Friday was released on a DVD as part of The Bela Lugosi Collection on September 6, 2005. Dave Kehr of The New York Times noted that the compilation compiled The Black Cat, The Raven, The Invisible Ray and Black Friday on a single disc, stating that the video quality was acceptable but contained "a lot of video compression".

== See also ==
- List of American films of 1940
- Boris Karloff filmography
- Bela Lugosi filmography
