= H. Cooper Cliffe =

British actor

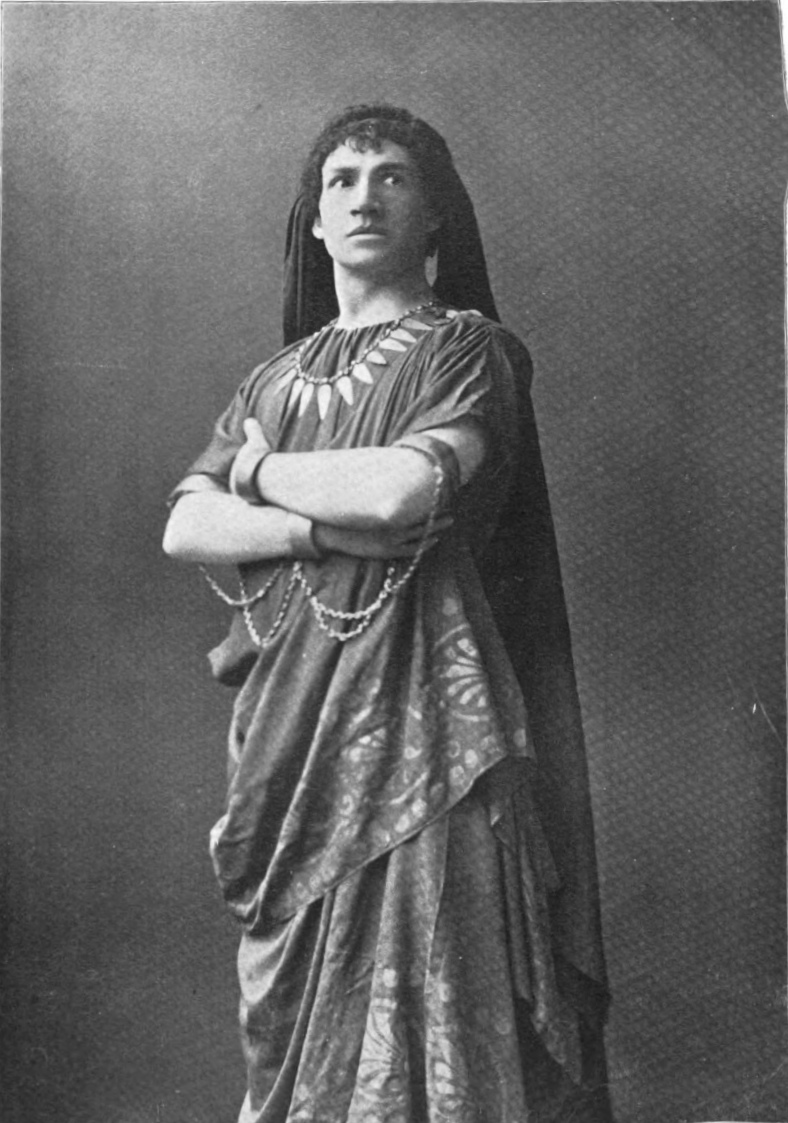
- Cliffe in costume, c. 1896
- Born: Henry Cooper; 19 July 1862; Oxford, Oxfordshire, England
- Died: 2 May 1939 (aged 76); New York City, New York, U.S.
- Occupation: Actor
- Years active: 1879–1934
- Spouse: Alice Belmont Cooper
- Relatives: Violet Kemble-Cooper (niece); Lillian Kemble-Cooper (niece)

Henry Cooper Cliffe (19 July 1862 – 1 May 1939) was a British stage and screen actor a member of a distinguished family of English actors, his father was Clifford Cooper, mother Agnes Kemble, and his brother was Frank Kemble Cooper. Frank's daughter Violet was a niece. His wife was Alice Belmore. He had an illustrious career on stage in classical roles. Late in life, he began appearing in silent film in the 1910s.

== Selected filmography ==
- The Face in the Moonlight (1915)
- The Final Judgment (1915)
- Gold and the Woman (1916)
- The Kiss of Hate (1916)
- Arms and the Woman (1916)
- Extravagance (1916)
- The Argyle Case (1917)
- Raffles, the Amateur Cracksman (1917)
- Half an Hour (1920)
- The Blue Pearl (1920)
- The Devil's Garden (1920)
- The Woman God Changed (1921)
- Love's Redemption (1921)
- His Children's Children (1923)
- Monsieur Beaucaire (1924)
