= The Kiss of Hate =

1916 film by William Nigh

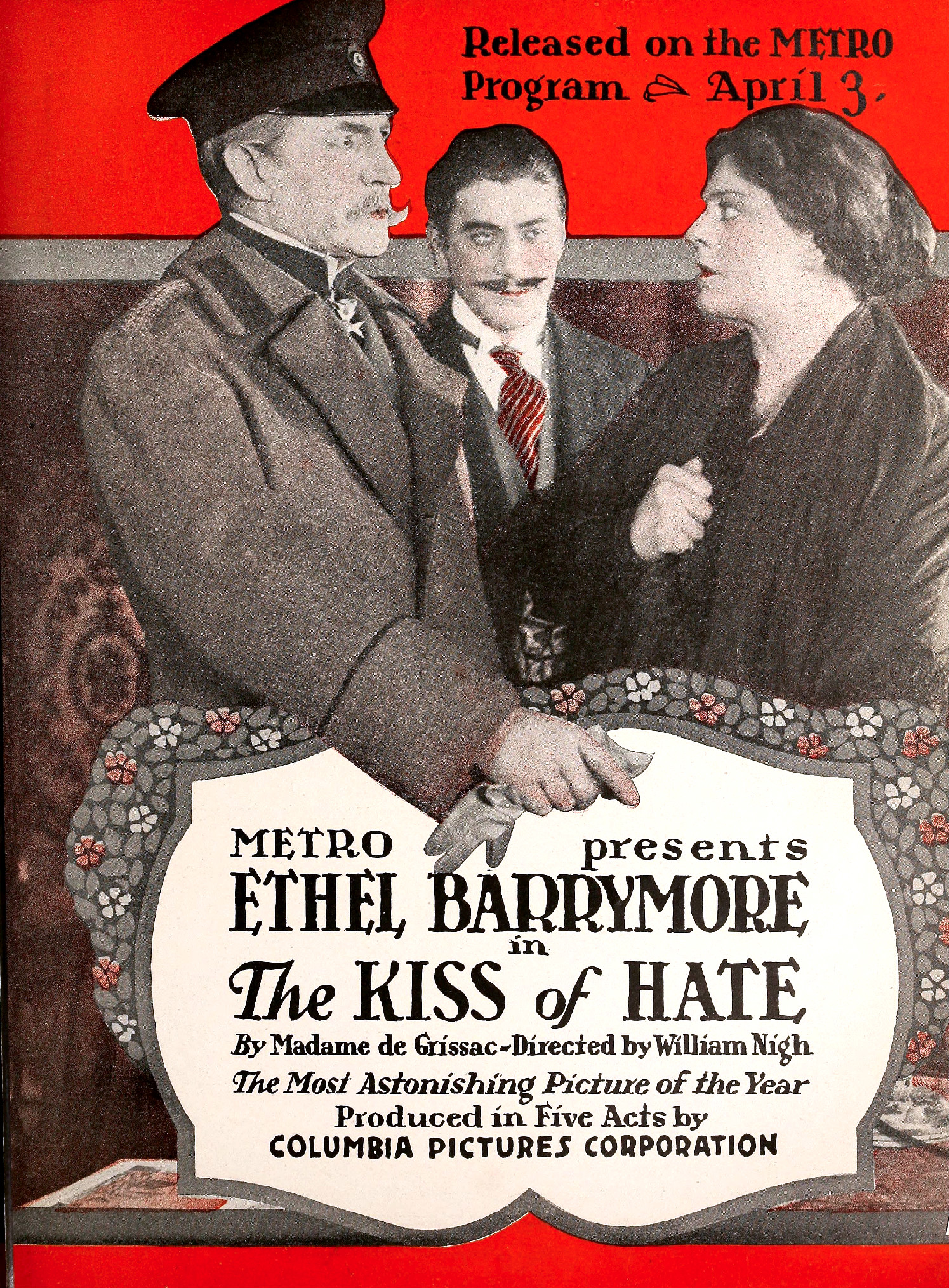
- Ad for film
- Directed by: William Nigh
- Written by: Fred de Gresac
- Starring: H. Cooper Cliffe; Ethel Barrymore
- Cinematography: Arthur A. Caldwell (*as A. A. Caldwell)
- Production company: Columbia Pictures Corp.
- Distributed by: Metro Pictures
- Release date: April 3, 1916
- Running time: 50 minutes
- Country: USA
- Language: Silent film..(English intertitles)

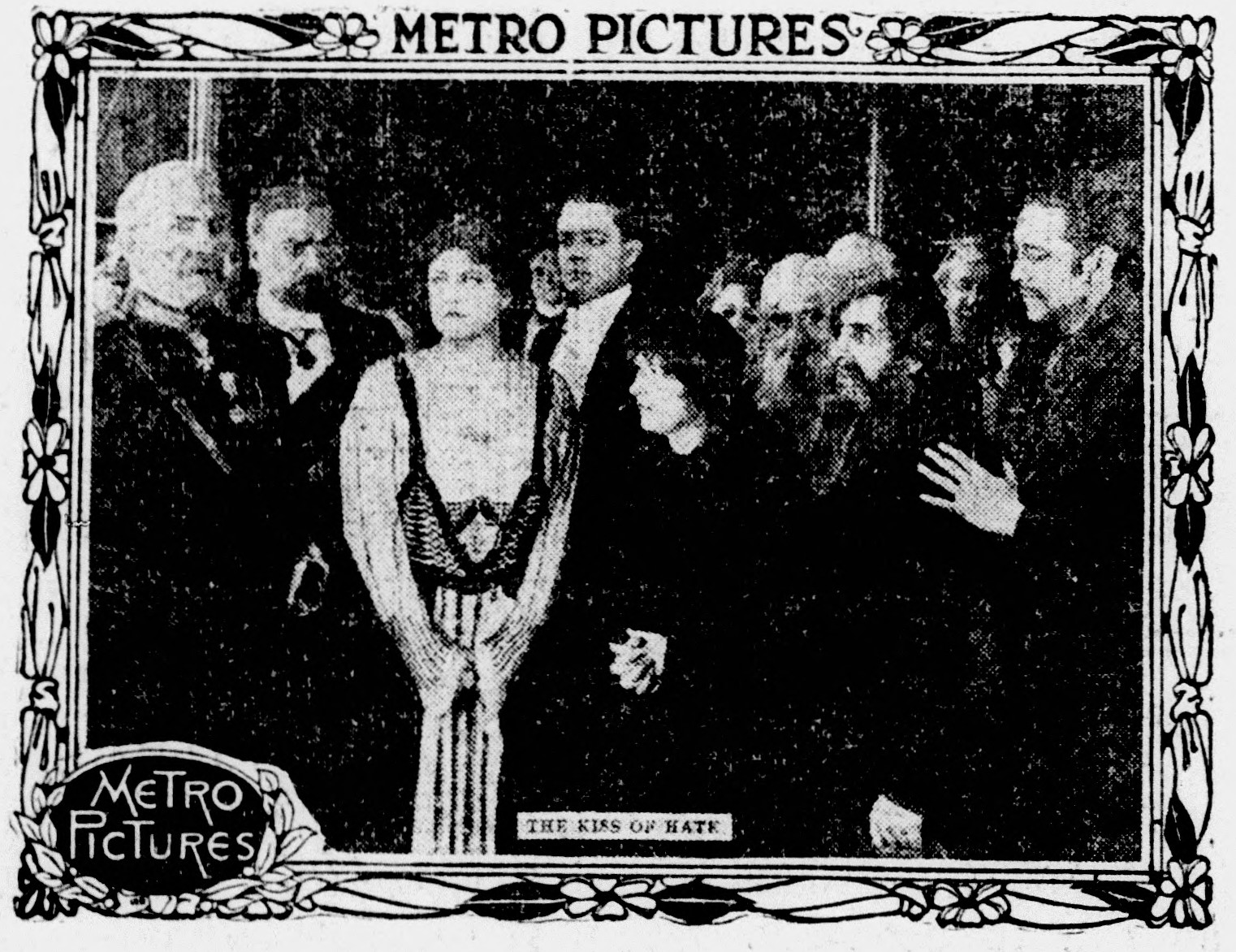
Publicity photo for the film.

The Kiss of Hate is a lost 1916 American silent drama film starring Ethel Barrymore and H. Cooper Cliffe.

The film had exclusive engagements, sometimes playing for only a day.

== Plot ==
The story takes place in Czarist Russia and concerns an antisemitic police commissioner, or Prefect, Count Orzoff and a woman Nadia who has spurned his amorous attentions. The commissioner seeks revenge against Nadia by killing her father. Orzoff becomes governor and Nadia plots revenge against him and is aided by a group of Jews who are also scheming against Orzoff. In further plot twists Nadia becomes romantic with Orzoff's son Sergius and in a bit of payback stabs Sergius in retribution for her father's murder. Sergius is only wounded and Nadia thinking she has killed him tries to commit suicide but Commissioner Orzof's guards stop her. For the rescue of his son, Nadia somehow gets Count Orzoff to sign papers admitting to persecuting Russian Jews. Nadia is in Orzoff's mansion completing the deal, when that group of Jews set fire to the house killing Nadia, Orzoff and Sergius.

== Cast ==
- Ethel Barrymore – Nadia Turgeneff
- H. Cooper Cliffe – Michael Orzoff
- Robert Elliott – Sergius Orzoff
- Roy Applegate – Goliath
- Niles Welch – Paul Turgeneff
- William L. Abingdon – Count Peter Turgeneff
- Victor De Linsky – Vernik
- Martin J. Faust – Nicholas
- William "Stage" Boyd – Isaac
- Frank Montgomery – Samuels
- Ilean Hume – Leah
- Daniel Sullivan – Police Spy

== Production ==
The Kiss of Hate was partially shot on location at C. K. G. Billings' Tryon Hall.
