= The Raven (1935 film) =

1935 film by Lew Landers

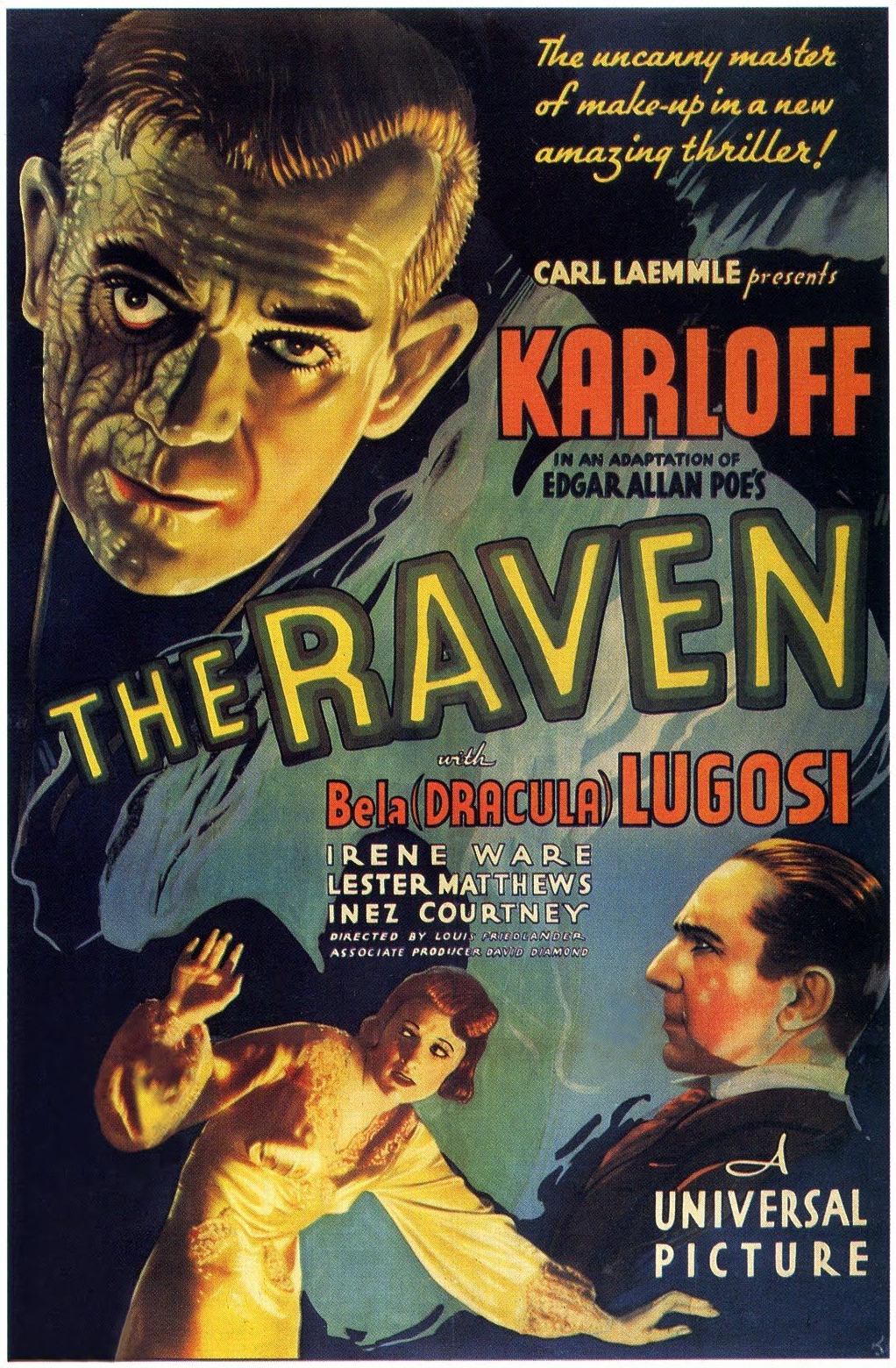
- Theatrical release poster by Karoly Grosz
- Directed by: Lew Landers
- Screenplay by: David Boehm
- Starring: Boris Karloff; Bela Lugosi; Irene Ware; Lester Matthews; Inez Courtney
- Cinematography: Charles Stumar
- Edited by: Albert Akst
- Music by: Clifford Vaughan
- Production company: Universal Pictures Corp.
- Distributed by: Universal Pictures Corp.
- Release date: 8 July 1935
- Running time: 61 minutes
- Country: United States
- Language: English
- Budget: $115,209.91

The Raven is a 1935 American horror film directed by Louis Friedlander (who started to be credited as Lew Landers the following year) and starring Boris Karloff and Bela Lugosi. Billed as having been "suggested by" Edgar Allan Poe's 1845 poem of the same title, excerpts of which are quoted at a few points in the film, it was adapted from an original screenplay by David Boehm. Lugosi stars as a neurosurgeon obsessed with Poe who has a torture chamber in his basement, and Karloff plays an escaped murderer on the run from the police whom Lugosi manipulates into doing his dirty work.

Three decades later, Karloff appeared in another film with the same title, Roger Corman's comedy gothic horror The Raven (1963), with Vincent Price and Peter Lorre.

== Plot ==
After Jean Thatcher, a young dancer, is injured in a car accident, her father, Judge Thatcher, and fiancé, Dr. Jerry Halden, implore neurosurgeon Dr. Richard Vollin, who now only conducts research, to come out of retirement and perform a delicate operation on her cranial nerve roots. Vollin is insensitive to human suffering and initially refuses to help, but when Judge Thatcher tells him that, in the opinion of his former hospital colleagues, only he can perform the operation successfully, Vollin's vanity persuades him to assist.

A month after the operation, Jean has recovered, and Vollin has become obsessed with her. She is grateful to Vollin for healing her, as well as for making Jerry his assistant, but when Vollin tells her during a checkup in his living room that he hired Jerry "to give him something to take the place of what he is losing", she avoids his embrace and gives an excuse for why she must go.

Knowing Vollin to be a devotee of Edgar Allan Poe, Jean surprises him by performing, as her return to the stage, a solo dance set to a recitation of "The Raven". Judge Thatcher suspects Jean may be falling for Vollin, so he visits the doctor to tell him to be careful not to lead her on. When it becomes clear that Vollin is already in love with Jean, the judge tells Vollin to not see Jean again so she will marry Jerry, who is much closer to her age. Vollin responds that his longing for Jean is distracting him from his important work, so Judge Thatcher must "send her" to him, but the judge says he is crazy and leaves.

A man comes to Vollin asking for a new face. Vollin recognizes the man as Edmond Bateman, a bank robber who is on the run after killing two guards while escaping from San Quentin, and says he will help in exchange for a favor that involves torture and murder, but Bateman replies that he no longer wishes to live a life of violence and only ended up on that path after being called ugly his whole life. Vollin agrees to improve Bateman's appearance, but instead disfigures half of the man's face by damaging his seventh cranial nerve, and Bateman reluctantly submits to Vollin so the doctor will undo the procedure.

Against Judge Thatcher's will, Jerry persuades Jean to accept an invitation to spend the weekend at Vollin's house with some other guests, so the judge also attends. Everyone feels uncomfortable around Bateman, who is acting as Vollin's butler, but Vollin says he was tortured by Arab bandits during the war, and Jean apologizes to him for having been frightened of his appearance, unknowingly endearing herself to the disfigured criminal. The judge wants to leave as the guests are going to sleep, but Jerry and Jean laugh off his concerns about Vollin.

At eleven o'clock, Bateman takes Judge Thatcher from his room. Jerry hears the judge's muffled cries and tries to help, but Bateman knocks him out and brings the judge to Vollin's cellar, where Vollin has built and collected various torture devices, including several inspired by works of Poe such as "The Pit and the Pendulum". The judge is strapped to a slab as a blade that will take 15 minutes to reach him swings above, and Vollin flips a switch to lower Jean's room down to the cellar.

Regaining consciousness, Jerry tries to call the police, but Vollin disconnects the telephones and drops steel shutters to trap everyone in the house. Vollin then leads Jerry to the cellar and, at gunpoint, forces him and Jean into a room. When Bateman learns that, inside, the walls are closing in and Jean will soon be crushed, he opens the door, and Vollin shoots him as the couple escape. Bateman tackles Vollin, knocking him out, and drags the doctor to the shrinking room, closing the door and starting the walls with the last of his strength. After Judge Thatcher is freed, the guests, thankful to the now-deceased Bateman for his sacrifice, all go home.

== Cast ==
- Boris Karloff (credited as Karloff) as Edmond Bateman, a bank robber on the run after killing two guards while escaping from San Quentin
- Béla Lugosi as Dr. Richard Vollin, a neurosurgeon obsessed with Edgar Allan Poe
- Lester Matthews as Dr. Jerry Halden, Jean's fiancé
- Irene Ware as Jean Thatcher, a dancer
- Samuel S. Hinds as Judge Thatcher, Jean's father
- Spencer Charters as Colonel Bertram Grant, (Note: The cast lists at the beginning and end of the film mistakenly credit Spencer Charters as playing Geoffrey and Ian Wolfe as playing Colonel Grant, rather than the other way around.) Harriet's husband, who is one of Vollin's guests
- Inez Courtney as Mary Burns, Geoffrey's wife and a friend of Jean and Jerry, who is one of Vollin's guests
- Ian Wolfe as Geoffrey "Pinky" Burns, Mary's husband and a friend of Jean and Jerry, who is one of Vollin's guests
- Maidel Turner as Harriet Grant, Bertram's wife, who is one of Vollin's guests
- Walter Miller as one of Jean's doctors (uncredited)
- Jonathan Hale as one of Jean's doctors (uncredited)
- Madeline Talcott as Jean's nurse (uncredited)
- Arthur Hoyt as Chapman, a representative of a museum that wants to buy Vollin's Poe collection (uncredited)
- Cyril Thornton as Vollin's butler (uncredited)
- Raine Bennett as the actor who recites "The Raven" during Jean's dance (uncredited)
- Al Ferguson as the man who sends Bateman to Vollin (uncredited)

== Production ==
Following Murders in the Rue Morgue (1932) and The Black Cat (1934), The Raven was the last of a trio of Poe films Universal Pictures released in the 1930s. Among the earliest mentions of the film from Universal was in June 1934, when the studio announced Bela Lugosi had signed on for a three-picture deal, one of which would be The Raven. Lugosi was paid US$5,000 for his role in the film, and Karloff was paid $10,000.

Between August 1934 and March 1935, at least seven writers worked on the script for The Raven. These included novelist Guy Endore, who submitted a 19-page treatment based on Poe's poem that also contained elements of the author's short story "The Gold-Bug". A week later, Universal announced it had signed Chester Morris for a role in the film, though Morris did not ultimately appear in the final film, and Endore's treatment was not used. In October 1934, Michael Simmons and Clarence Marks collaborated on a treatment and wrote a screenplay based upon it. John Lynch and Dore Schary also reportedly contributed to a script, but whether or not their work was used is unknown. Former Warner Bros. dialogue writer David Boehm was then engaged to write a script and turned in three screenplays for The Raven to Universal, and he is the only screenwriter listed in the credits of the completed film.

Director Lew Landers (who was still going by his birth name of Louis Friedlander) was hired to oversee the film's 16-day shoot, which was set to begin on March 20, 1935. Four days before production began, a conference between Landers, the Production Code Administration (PCA), and Universal studio executives took place to confirm that no scenes of the operation on Bateman would be shown. The PCA also reviewed various shots of Bateman to determine their suitability, and, after studying the final shooting script from March 19, issued a written statement saying that "we [...] deem it necessary to remind you that, because of the stark realism of numerous elements in your story, you are running the risk of excessive horror". Filming was completed on schedule on April 5 at a cost of $115,209.91, which was $5,000 over the budget.

Following a renewed interest in horror films after the reissue of Frankenstein and Dracula in 1938, Universal planned a remake of The Raven with both Karloff and Lugosi.

== Release ==
The Raven was distributed theatrically by Universal Pictures in July 1935. (Note: Sources differ on the release date of The Raven. The book Universal Horrors states the film was released on July 22, the American Film Institute lists July 8, and newspapers can be found that indicate release dates as early as July 1.) It was banned in several territories on its initial release, including China, the Netherlands, and Ontario and British Columbia in Canada, and, in the United Kingdom, The Times issued a report on horror films, and The Raven in particular, on August 4, 1935, which stated:

Every picture should have a purpose, preferably a high one. Any concentration upon Murder as Murder can only kill the films themselves. But it is difficult to speculate as to what intention, other than the stimulation of a low morbid interest, can be behind such a production as The Raven. [...] Here is a film of "horror" for "horror's" sake. [...] It devises shelter under the statement that it has been inspired by the genius of Edgar Allan Poe. Nonsense. Neither story nor treatment give indication of any imaginative control.

Nineteen days later, the Associated Press reported that The Raven would be the last horror film passed by the British Board of Film Censors. The authors noted, however, that this reception did not alter Universal's plans to have Karloff and Lugosi star in The Invisible Ray (1936), a film they described as "decidedly tamer".

=== Home media ===
The film was released on DVD in 2005 as part of the set "The Bela Lugosi Collection", along with Murders in the Rue Morgue (1932), The Black Cat (1934), The Invisible Ray (1936), and Black Friday (1940). In 2013, Altitude Film Entertainment licensed the film from Hollywood Classics (on behalf of Universal Pictures) to release the film on DVD in the UK. In 2019, in the U.S., Shout Factory released it on Blu-ray as part of its Universal Horror Collection: Volume 1 along with The Black Cat, The Invisible Ray, and Black Friday. Eureka Entertainment released the film on Blu-ray in July 2020 as part of its Masters of Cinema collection in the "Three Edgar Allan Poe Adaptations Starring Bela Lugosi" set, which also includes Murders in the Rue Morgue and The Black Cat.

== Critical reception ==
A contemporary review in The New York Times written by Frank S. Nugent declared that "[i]f The Raven is the best that Universal can do with one of the greatest horror story writers of all time, then it had better toss away the other two books in its library and stick to the pulpies for plot material". Thornton Delehanty of The New York Evening Post had a similar reaction, stating that the film "has no more bearing on the original source than a stuffed bird has to an elephant".

Decades after the film's release, the authors of the book Universal Horrors stated that "few of the vintage Universal shock classics (with the exception of Dracula) have sustained as many brickbats as this ill-conceived film", noting that Karloff was miscast and remarking on the undistinguished quality of the writing and direction.

== See also ==
- List of American films of 1935
- Bela Lugosi filmography
- Boris Karloff filmography
