= Boris Karloff performances =

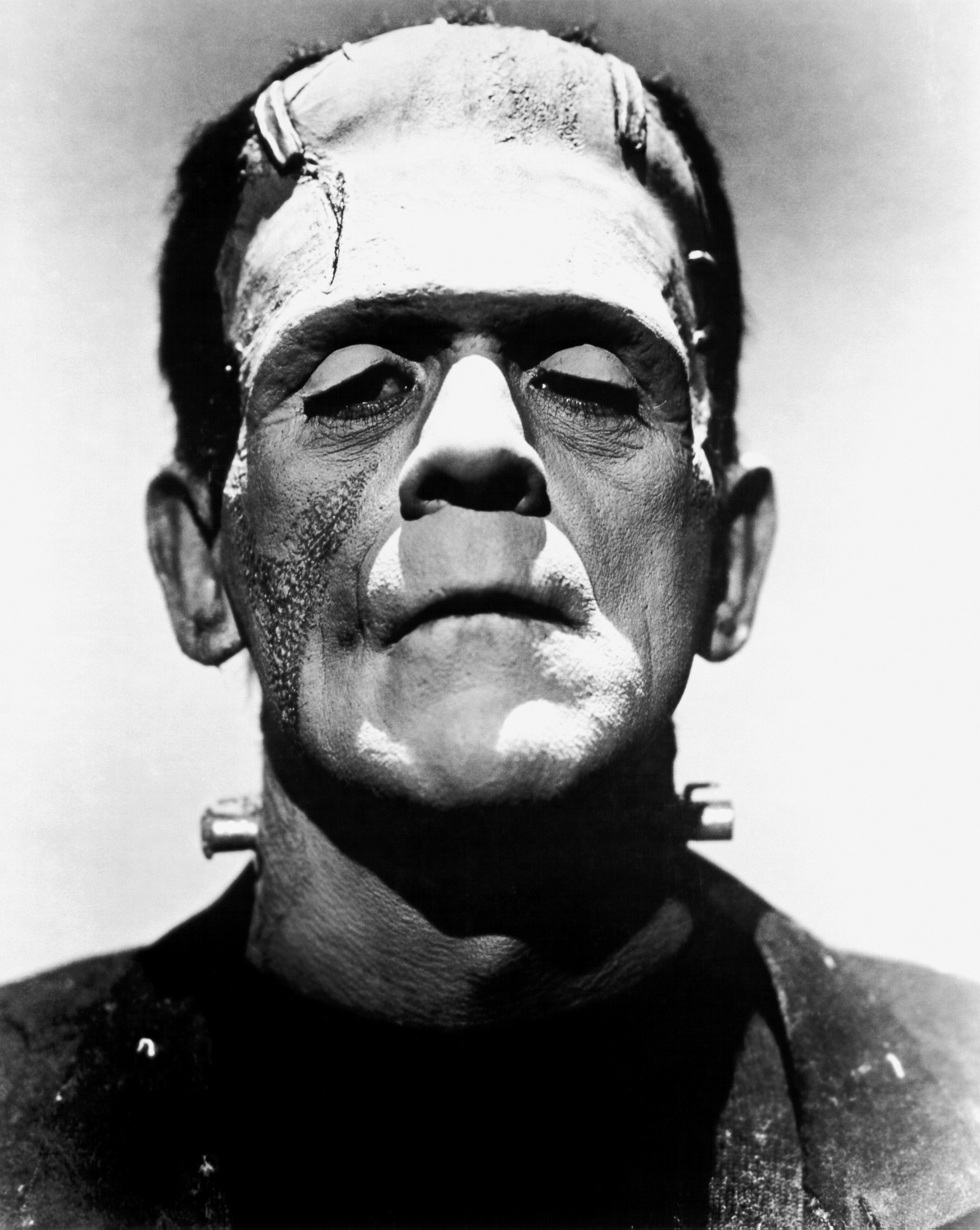
Karloff in Bride of Frankenstein

Boris Karloff (1887–1969) was an English actor. He became known for his role as Frankenstein's monster in the 1931 Frankenstein (his 82nd film), leading to a long career in film, radio, and television.

Born William Henry Pratt in England, he emigrated to Canada in 1909 as a young man and eventually joined a Canadian touring company, adopting the stage name Boris Karloff. By 1919, Karloff moved to Hollywood where he found regular work as an extra at Universal Studios. Although he appeared in numerous silent films, Karloff's first significant roles were in Howard Hawks's The Criminal Code (1931) and Mervyn LeRoy's Five Star Final (1931). While shooting Graft, director James Whale convinced Karloff to star as Frankenstein's monster in Frankenstein, which led to him becoming an overnight superstar. After Frankenstein and starring in several high-profile films such as Bride of Frankenstein (1935) and The Mummy (1932), Karloff spent the remainder of the 1930s working at an incredible pace, but getting progressively involved in lower budget films. In the 1940s, he began to get stereotyped into playing "mad scientist" roles.

Karloff starred in a few highly acclaimed Val Lewton-produced horror films in the 1940s, and by the mid-1950s, he was a familiar presence on both television and radio, hosting his own TV series including Starring Boris Karloff, Colonel March of Scotland Yard, Thriller, Out of This World and The Veil, and guest starring on such programs as Suspense, The Donald O'Connor Show, I Spy and Route 66. He also played Detective Wong (five times) in the 1930s Mister Wong film series. In the 1960s, Karloff worked for Roger Corman at American International Pictures. He also made films in England, Italy and Spain. All told, he appeared in 174 motion pictures. His final American film was Peter Bogdanovich's Targets (1968), in which he portrayed an aging horror film star much like himself.

== Filmography ==
Year	Film	Role	Director	Notes
1919	The Lightning Raider	Extra	George B. Seitz	15-chapter film serial starring Pearl White an incomplete print exists
1919	The Masked Rider	Mexican Roughneck	Aubrey M. Kennedy	15-chapter film serial an incomplete print exists
1919	His Majesty, the American	Extra	Joseph Henabery	starring Douglas Fairbanks a complete print exists
1919	The Prince and Betty	Extra	Robert Thornby	considered a lost film
1920	The Deadlier Sex	Jules Borney, fur trader	Robert Thornby	This film was restored in 2014
1920	The Courage of Marge O'Doone	Buck Tavish, a mountain man	David Smith	considered a lost film
1920	The Last of the Mohicans	Huron Indian brave (extra)	Maurice Tourneur, Clarence Brown	a complete print exists
1921	The Hope Diamond Mystery	Dakar: High Priest of Kama-Sita	Stuart Paton	15-chapter film serial; Karloff's first major screen credit a complete print exists
1921	Without Benefit of Clergy	Ahmed Khan	James Young	Based on a short story by Rudyard Kipling a complete print exists
1921	Cheated Hearts	Nei Hamid	Hobart Henley	considered a lost film
1921	The Cave Girl	Baptiste, the half-breed	Joseph Franz	considered a lost film
1922	The Man from Downing Street	dual role as Dell Monckton/ Maharajah Jehan Dharwar	Edward José	considered a lost film
1922	Nan of the North	Extra (Uncredited)	Duke Worne	considered a lost film
1922	The Infidel	The Nabob of Menang	James Young	considered a lost film
1922	The Altar Stairs	Hugo	Lambert Hillyer	considered a lost film
1922	The Woman Conquers	Raoul Maris	Tom Forman	considered a lost film
1922	Omar the Tentmaker	Holy Imam Mowaffak	James Young	Based on the play Omar Khayyam co-starred Noah Beery Sr. considered a lost film
1923	The Gentleman from America	Extra (Uncredited)	Edward Sedgwick	starring Hoot Gibson considered a lost film
1923	The Prisoner	Prince Kapolski	Jack Conway	considered a lost film
1924	The White Panther	Native	Alan James	considered a lost film
1924	The Hellion	Outlaw	Bruce Mitchell	considered a lost film
1924	Riders of the Plains	Extra (Uncredited)	Jacques Jaccard	15-chapter film serial considered a lost film
1924	Dynamite Dan	Tony Garcia	Bruce Mitchell	available on DVD
1925	Forbidden Cargo	Pietro Castellano	Tom Buckingham	considered a lost film
1925	Parisian Nights	Pierre, a French Apache	Alfred Santell	A print exists in a Belgian archive
1925	The Prairie Wife	Diego	Hugo Ballin	considered a lost film
1925	Lady Robinhood	Cabraza, a Spaniard	Ralph Ince	Only the trailer exists in the Library of Congress
1925	Perils of the Wild	Extra (Uncredited)	Francis Ford	15-chapter film serial based on the novel Swiss Family Robinson considered a lost film
1925	Without Mercy	Henchman	George Melford	considered a lost film
1925	Never the Twain Shall Meet	Villain (bit part)	Maurice Tourneur	considered a lost film remade by MGM in 1931
1926	The Greater Glory	Scissors grinder	Curt Rehfeld	aka The Viennese Medley considered a lost film
1926	The Man in the Saddle	Robber	Clifford S. Smith	starring Hoot Gibson and Fay Wray; considered a lost film
1926	Her Honor, the Governor	Snipe Collins, drug addict	Chet Withey	aka The Second Mrs. Fenway; A complete print survives
1926	The Bells	The Mesmerist	James Young	co-starring Lionel Barrymore; available on DVD
1926	The Golden Web	Dave Sinclair, a blackmailer	Walter Lang	considered a lost film
1926	Flames	Blackie Blanchett, a bandit	Lewis H. Moomaw	Only one reel survives in the Library of Congress; The film's climax was filmed in color
1926	The Eagle of the Sea	Pirate	Frank Lloyd	Based on a novel Captain Sazarac; An incomplete print exists
1926	The Nickel-Hopper	Big Bohunk, a masher	Hal Yates	co-starring Oliver Hardy
1926	Flaming Fury	Gaspard, the half-breed	James Hogan	co-starring Ranger, the Wonder Dog; A complete print exists in the Cinematheque Royale de Belgique
1926	Old Ironsides	Saracen Guard	James Cruze	aka Sons of the Sea; starring Wallace Beery; a complete print exists
1926	Valencia	Bit part (uncredited)	Dimitri Buchowetzki	aka The Love Song; considered a lost film
1927	Let It Rain	Crook	Edward Francis Cline	considered a lost film
1927	The Princess from Hoboken	Pavel, a Frenchman	Allan Dale	considered a lost film
1927	Tarzan and the Golden Lion	Owaza, the Waziri native chieftain	J. P. McGowan	starring James Pierce as "Tarzan"; available on DVD
1927	The Meddlin' Stranger	Al Meggs	Richard Thorpe	considered a lost film
1927	The Phantom Buster	Ramón, a smuggler	William Bertram	considered a lost film
1927	Soft Cushions	Chief Conspirator	Edward Francis Cline	considered a lost film
1927	Two Arabian Knights	Ship's Purser	Lewis Milestone	produced by Howard Hughes co-starring William Boyd; A print exists at the University of Nevada, Las Vegas
1927	The Love Mart	Fleming	George Fitzmaurice	considered a lost film
1928	Sharp Shooters	Cafe Owner	John G. Blystone	A print of this film survives in the UCLA Film and Television Archives
1928	The Vanishing Rider	Villain	Ray Taylor	10-chapter film serial considered a lost film
1928	Vultures of the Sea	Grouchy, a pirate	Richard Thorpe	10-chapter film serial considered a lost film
1928	The Little Wild Girl	Maurice Kent	Frank Mattison	Prints of this film are held at UCLA Film & TV and at the Library of Congress.
1928	Burning the Wind	Pug Doran	Henry MacRae, Herbert Blaché	starring Hoot Gibson considered a lost film
1929	The Fatal Warning	Mullins	Richard Thorpe	10-chapter film serial considered a lost film
1929	The Devil's Chaplain	Boris	Duke Worne	Survival status unknown
1929	Two Sisters	Cecil	Scott Pembroke	considered to be lost
1929	Anne Against the World	Extra (Uncredited)	Duke Worne	Survival status unknown
1929	The Phantom of the North	Jules Gregg, fur thief	Harry S. Webb	Karloff's last silent film An incomplete print is available on DVD
1929	Behind That Curtain	a Sudanese servant	Irving Cummings	Karloff's first sound film features a cameo by Charlie Chan; Available on DVD
1929	The King of the Kongo	dual role as Scarface Macklin and Martin	Richard Thorpe	10-chapter film serial (partial sound); A kickstarter project has restored this serial
1929	The Unholy Night	Abdoul	Lionel Barrymore	Based on a story called The Green Ghost; A complete print exists
1930	The Bad One	Monsieur Gaston, a guard	George Fitzmaurice	co-starring Dolores del Rio
1930	The Sea Bat	Corsican	Wesley Ruggles	Originally written in 1929 as a Lon Chaney/Tod Browning collaboration
1930	The Utah Kid	Baxter	Richard Thorpe	Western starring Rex Lease
1930	Mothers Cry	Murder victim	Hobart Henley	co-starring Helen Chandler and David Manners; Karloff's involvement is disputed by some sources
1931	Sous les verrous (French version of Pardon Us)	The Tiger, a jailhouse prisoner	James Parrott	Karloff only appears in the French language version of this Laurel and Hardy film
1931	The Criminal Code	Ned Galloway, convict	Howard Hawks	The film that brought Karloff to James Whale's attention
1931	King of the Wild	Mustapha	B. Reeves Eason, Richard Thorpe	12-chapter film serial
1931	The Last Parade	Prison Warden	Erle C. Kenton	starring Jack Holt; Karloff's appearance is disputed in some sources
1931	Cracked Nuts	Boris, a revolutionary	Edward F. Cline	stars the comedy team of Wheeler and Woolsey
1931	The Vanishing Legion	voice of "The Voice", the serial's mystery villain	Ford Beebe and B. Reeves Eason	12-chapter film serial; only Karloff's voice appears in this film
1931	Young Donovan's Kid	Cokey Joe, a drug dealer	Fred Niblo	starring Jackie Cooper
1931	Smart Money	Sport Williams, a gambler (uncredited)	Alfred E. Green	starring James Cagney and Edward G. Robinson
1931	The Public Defender	The Professor	J. Walter Ruben	based on the novel The Splendid Crime
1931	I Like Your Nerve	Luigi	William McGann	starring Douglas Fairbanks Jr. and Loretta Young
1931	Graft	Joe Terry, a gangster	William Christy Cabanne	
1931	Five Star Final	"Reverend" T. Vernon Isopod	Mervyn LeRoy	starring Edward G. Robinson
1931	The Yellow Ticket	Lecherous orderly	Raoul Walsh	starring Lionel Barrymore and Laurence Olivier
1931	The Mad Genius	Fedor's abusive father	Michael Curtiz	starring John Barrymore and Frankie Darro
1931	The Guilty Generation	Tony Ricca, a gangster	Rowland V. Lee	starring Leo Carrillo and Robert Young
1931	Frankenstein	Frankenstein's monster	James Whale	starring Colin Clive, Edward Van Sloan, Dwight Frye and Mae Clarke
1931	Tonight or Never	Waiter	Mervyn LeRoy	starring Gloria Swanson and Melvyn Douglas
1932	The Cohens and Kellys in Hollywood	Himself	Mervyn LeRoy	Karloff and Tom Mix both appear as themselves in cameos
1932	Behind the Mask	Jim Henderson, a hoodlum	John Francis Dillon	co-starring Jack Holt and Edward Van Sloan
1932	Business and Pleasure	Sheikh	David Butler	starring Will Rogers and Joel McCrea
1932	Scarface	Tom Gaffney, a gangster	Howard Hawks	produced by Howard Hughes; Starring Paul Muni and George Raft
1932	The Miracle Man	Nikko, crooked restaurant owner	Norman Z. McLeod	Remake of a Lon Chaney silent film
1932	Night World	"Happy" MacDonald, nightclub owner	Hobart Henley	starring Lew Ayres and Mae Clarke
1932	The Old Dark House	Morgan, the butler	James Whale	Billed for the first time as KARLOFF co-starred Charles Laughton and Ernest Thesiger
1932	Alias the Doctor	Autopsy Surgeon	Lloyd Bacon, Michael Curtiz	Karloff's scenes were edited out of the film by the censors due to violence and no longer exist
1932	The Mask of Fu Manchu	Dr. Fu Manchu	Charles J. Brabin, Charles Vidor, King Vidor	Based on the Fu Manchu novels by Sax Rohmer
1932	The Mummy	Imhotep/Ardath Bey	Karl Freund	Billed as KARLOFF co-starring Edward Van Sloan and Zita Johann
1933	The Ghoul	Professor Morlant	T. Hayes Hunter	This film was shot in England, co-starring Cedric Hardwicke and Ernest Thesiger
1934	The Lost Patrol	Sanders, a religious fanatic	John Ford	co-starring Victor McLaglen
1934	The House of Rothschild	Count Ledrantz, an anti-Semite	Alfred L. Werker	co-starring George Arliss and Loretta Young filmed partially in Technicolor
1934	The Black Cat	Hjalmar Poelzig, Satanist	Edgar G. Ulmer	Billed as KARLOFF co-starring Bela Lugosi
1934	Gift of Gab	Himself	Karl W. Freund	Billed as KARLOFF co-starring Bela Lugosi
1935	Bride of Frankenstein	Frankenstein's Monster	James Whale	Billed as KARLOFF co-starring Colin Clive, Dwight Frye and Ernest Thesiger
1935	The Raven	Edmond Bateman	Lew Landers	Billed as KARLOFF co-starring Bela Lugosi
1935	The Black Room	dual role as Gregor de Berghmann and Anton de Berghmann	Roy William Neill	
1936	The Invisible Ray	Dr. Janos Rukh	Lambert Hillyer	Billed as KARLOFF co-starring Bela Lugosi
1936	The Walking Dead	John Ellman	Michael Curtiz	
1936	Juggernaut	Dr. Victor Sartorius	Henry Edwards	filmed in England
1936	The Man Who Changed His Mind	Dr. Laurience	Robert Stevenson	aka The Man Who Lived Again; filmed in England
1936	Charlie Chan at the Opera	Gravelle, an opera star	H. Bruce Humberstone	starring Warner Oland as Charlie Chan
1937	Night Key	Inventor Dave Mallory	Lloyd Corrigan	Billed as KARLOFF
1937	West of Shanghai	General Wu Yen Fang, Chinese warlord	John Farrow	
1938	The Invisible Menace	Jevries, a red herring	Lloyd Corrigan	
1938	Mr. Wong, Detective	James Lee Wong	William Nigh	First of five "Mr. Wong" films Karloff starred in
1939	Devil's Island	Dr. Charles Gaudet	William Nigh	
1939	Son of Frankenstein	Frankenstein's Monster	Rowland V. Lee	co-starring Bela Lugosi, Basil Rathbone and Lionel Atwill
1939	The Mystery of Mr. Wong	James Lee Wong	William Nigh	
1939	Mr. Wong in Chinatown	James Lee Wong	William Nigh	
1939	The Man They Could Not Hang	Dr. Henryk Savaard	Nick Grinde	
1939	Tower of London	Mord, the executioner	Rowland V. Lee	co-starring Basil Rathbone and Vincent Price
1940	The Fatal Hour	James Lee Wong	William Nigh	
1940	British Intelligence	dual role as Valdar and Franz Strendler	Terrell O. Morse	aka Enemy Agent
1940	Black Friday	Dr. Ernest Sovac	Arthur Lubin	co-starring Bela Lugosi and written by Curt Siodmak
1940	The Man with Nine Lives	Dr. Leon Kravaal	Nick Grinde	
1940	Doomed to Die	James Lee Wong	William Nigh	Fifth and final "Mr. Wong" film to star Karloff
1940	Before I Hang	Dr. John Garth	Nick Grinde	co-starring Edward Van Sloan
1940	The Ape	Dr. Bernard Adrian	William Nigh	co-written by Curt Siodmak
1940	You'll Find Out	Judge Spencer Mainwaring	David Butler	co-starring Bela Lugosi and Peter Lorre
1941	The Devil Commands	Dr. Julian Blair	Edward Dmytryk	
1942	The Boogie Man Will Get You	Professor Nathaniel Billings	Lew Landers	co-starring Peter Lorre
1944	The Climax	Dr. Friedrich Hohner	George Waggner	Karloff's first Technicolor film
1944	The House of Frankenstein	Dr. Gustav Niemann	Erle C. Kenton	co-starring Lon Chaney Jr. and John Carradine
1945	The Body Snatcher	John Gray, a body snatcher	Robert Wise	co-starring Bela Lugosi; produced by Val Lewton
1945	Isle of the Dead	General Nikolas Pherides	Mark Robson	produced by Val Lewton
1946	Bedlam	Master George Sims	Mark Robson	produced by Val Lewton
1947	The Secret Life of Walter Mitty	Dr. Hugo Hollingshead	Norman Z. McLeod	starring Danny Kaye
1947	Lured	Charles Van Druten, an artist	Douglas Sirk	co-starring George Zucco and Lucille Ball
1947	Unconquered	Indian chief Guyasuta	Cecil B. DeMille	directed by Cecil B. DeMille; starring Gary Cooper
1947	Dick Tracy Meets Gruesome	Gruesome	John Rawlins	starring Ralph Byrd as Dick Tracy
1948	Tap Roots	Tishomingo, an Indian brave	George Marshall	Filmed in Technicolor; starring Van Heflin
1949	Abbott and Costello Meet the Killer, Boris Karloff	Swami Talpur	Charles Barton	co-starring Lenore Aubert
1951	The Emperor's Nightingale aka Cisaruv Slavik	Narrator only	Jiří Trnka	Czech animated movie; Karloff narrated the English-language version only; filmed in 1949 but released in U.S. in 1951
1951	The Strange Door	Voltan, the servant	Joseph Pevney	starring Charles Laughton; based on a story by Robert Louis Stevenson
1952	The Black Castle	Dr. Meissen	Nathan Juran	co-starring Richard Greene and Lon Chaney Jr.
1953	Abbott and Costello Meet Dr. Jekyll and Mr. Hyde	Dr. Henry Jekyll / Mr. Edward Hyde	Charles Lamont	
1953	Sabaka (aka The Hindu)	General Pollegar	Frank Ferrin	Filmed partially in India, but Karloff's scenes were filmed in Hollywood; film was previewed in 1953 as The Hindu, and later went into general release in 1955 retitled Sabaka
1954	The Monster of the Island (Il mostro dell'isola)	Don Gaetano	Roberto Bianchi Montero	Filmed in Italy; aka The Island Monster
1954	Colonel March Investigates (Feature film version)	Colonel Perceval March	Cyril Endfield	Feature-length film composed of three "Colonel March" British TV episodes
1957	Voodoo Island	Dr. Phillip Knight	Reginald LeBorg	
1958	The Juggler of Our Lady	Narrator only	Al Kouzel	Terrytoons theatrical cartoon nominated for a BAFTA Award
1958	The Creation of the World (aka La creation du monde)	Narrator (of the English language version only)	Eduard Hofman	An 83-minute Czechoslovak/French animated film; Karloff narrated the English language dubbed version only; film was condemned by the Vatican
1958	The Haunted Strangler (aka Grip of the Strangler)	James Rankin	Robert Day	filmed in England; produced by Richard Gordon
1958	Frankenstein 1970	Baron Victor von Frankenstein	Howard W. Koch	
1958	Corridors of Blood (aka The Doctor From Seven Dials)	Dr. Thomas Bolton	Robert Day	filmed in England in 1958, co-starring Christopher Lee; released in U.S. in May 1963
1960	Who Killed Chung Ling Soo?	Narrator only	Al Kouzel	Five-minute theatrical short investigating the death of a true-life Chinese magician in 1900
1963	The Raven	The sorcerer Dr. Scarabus	Roger Corman	co-starring Vincent Price and Peter Lorre; written by Richard Matheson
1963	The Terror	Baron Victor von Leppe	Roger Corman	starring Jack Nicholson and Sandra Knight
1963	Black Sabbath (aka I tre volti della paura)	dual role as Narrator and Gorca the vampire	Mario Bava	Filmed in Italy in 1963; released in U.S. in May 1964
1963	The Comedy of Terrors	Amos Hinchley	Jacques Tourneur	co-starring Vincent Price, Basil Rathbone and Peter Lorre; released in U.S. Christmas Day, 1963
1964	Bikini Beach	Art Dealer	William Asher	starring Frankie Avalon, Annette Funicello
1964	Mondo Balordo (Foolish World)	Narrator only	Roberto Bianchi Montero	filmed in Italy; English-dubbed version was released in U.S. in 1969
1965	Die, Monster, Die! (U.K. title: Monster of Terror)	Nahum Whitley	Daniel Haller	filmed in England; based on a story by H. P. Lovecraft
1966	The Ghost in the Invisible Bikini	Hiram Stokely	Don Weis	co-starring Tommy Kirk and Basil Rathbone
1966	The Daydreamer (animated film)	The Rat	Jules Bass	Rankin-Bass animated film inspired by the stories of Hans Christian Andersen
1967	The Venetian Affair	Dr. Pierre Vaugiroud	Jerry Thorpe	co-starring Robert Vaughn, Roger C. Carmel and Elke Sommer
1967	Mad Monster Party?	Baron Boris von Frankenstein (voice only)	Jules Bass	Feature-length animated film
1967	The Sorcerers	Professor Marcus Montserrat	Michael Reeves	filmed in England; directed by Michael Reeves
1968	Targets	Byron Orlok, aging horror film star	Peter Bogdanovich	released in August, 1968
1968	Curse of the Crimson Altar (U.S. title: The Crimson Cult)	Professor Marsh	Vernon Sewell	Filmed in England; released in U.K. Nov. 24, 1968 (the final film released during Karloff's lifetime); released in U.S. in May, 1970 posthumously
1970	Cauldron of Blood (El Coleccionista de cadáveres) aka Blindman's Bluff	Charles Franz Badulescu, a blind sculptor	Santos Alcocer (credited as Edward Mann)	Filmed in Spain in Spring 1967; released in Spain in 1970 posthumously
1971	Isle of the Snake People (aka La muerte viviente, Snake People and Cult of the Dead)	dual role as Karl van Molder / Damballah	Juan Ibáñez, Jack Hill	Filmed in May 1968; released in March 1971 posthumously
1971	The Incredible Invasion (aka Alien Terror, Invasion siniestra and The Sinister Invasion)	Professor John Mayer	Luis Enrique Vergara, Jack Hill	Filmed in May 1968; released in April 1971 posthumously
1971	Fear Chamber (aka La camara del terror and The Torture Zone)	Dr. Carl Mandel	Juan Ibáñez, Jack Hill	Filmed in May 1968; released in 1971 posthumously
1972	House of Evil (aka Serenata macabra and Dance of Death)	Mathias Morteval	Luis Enrique Vergara, Jack Hill	Filmed in May 1968; released in 1972 posthumously (final role)

== Television and newsreel appearances ==
(Major appearances are highlighted in boldface)

- Screen Snapshots #11 (1934) Karloff and Bela Lugosi appeared in this 10-minute newsreel feature, along with James Cagney and Maureen O'Sullivan (interviews)
- Hollywood Hobbies (1935) Karloff was interviewed briefly on this 10-minute newsreel feature which also featured Clark Gable and Buster Crabbe
- The Chevrolet Tele-Theatre NBC-TV Show (Feb. 7, 1949) Episode Expert Opinion
- The Ford Theatre Hour CBS-TV Anthology show (April 11, 1949) acted in the play Arsenic and Old Lace
- Star Theatre (April 12, 1949)
- Suspense CBS-TV Anthology show (April 26, 1949) Episode A Night at an Inn
- The Chevrolet Tele-Theatre NBC-TV Show (May 9, 1949) Episode Passenger to Bali
- Suspense CBS-TV Anthology show (May 17, 1949) Episode The Monkey's Paw
- Suspense CBS-TV Anthology show (June 7, 1949) Episode The Yellow Scarf
- Celebrity Time ABC-TV Quiz Show (Sept. 4, 1949) – with host Conrad Nagel
- Starring Boris Karloff Weekly ABC-TV Anthology Series (Sept. 22, 1949 - Dec. 15, 1949) – Karloff acted in 13 weekly 30-minute episodes; this show was broadcast as both a TV show and a radio show simultaneously (See subsection on Karloff's appearances on Starring Boris Karloff below.)
- Inside U.S.A. with Chevrolet CBS-TV Variety Show (1949)
- Supper Club (Feb. 19, 1950) Guest
- Masterpiece Playhouse NBC-TV Anthology Series (Sept. 3, 1950) – co-starred with Eva Gabor in "Uncle Vanya", written by Anton Chekov
- Lights Out NBC-TV Anthology show (Sept. 18, 1950) – appeared in 30-minute episode entitled "The Leopard Lady"
- Paul Whiteman's Goodyear Revue ABC-TV variety show (Oct. 29, 1950) Karloff co-starred in a haunted house Halloween skit
- The Texaco Star Theatre (aka The Milton Berle Show) (Dec. 12, 1950) NBC-TV comedy/variety show – Guest
- The Don McNeil TV Club ABC-TV variety show (April 11, 1951) Guest
- The Texaco Star Theatre (aka The Milton Berle Show) (Oct. 9, 1951) Guest
- The Fred Waring General Electric Show CBS-TV musical variety show (Oct. 21, 1951) Guest
- Robert Montgomery Presents NBC-TV dramatic anthology show (Nov. 19, 1951) Karloff acted in a play entitled "The Kimballs"
- Celebrity Time CBS-TV quiz show (Nov. 25, 1951) Karloff appeared with Kitty Carlisle and host Conrad Nagel
- Studio One CBS-TV Anthology show (Dec. 3, 1951) Karloff acted in a play entitled "Mutiny on the Nicolette"
- Suspense CBS-TV Anthology show (Christmas Day, 1951) Episode The Lonely Place; co-starred Judith Evelyn
- Lux Video Theatre CBS-TV Anthology Show (Dec. 31, 1951) Karloff played Arthur Strangways in a play entitled "The Jest of Hahalaba" (written by Lord Dunsany)
- Columbia Workshop (aka CBS Television Workshop) – CBS-TV Anthology Show (Jan. 13, 1952) Karloff played the title role in a play Don Quixote
- The Stork Club CBS-TV Talk show (Jan. 30, 1952) interviewed by host Sherman Billingsley
- **Tales of Tomorrow** ABC-TV Sci-Fi Anthology Show (Feb. 22, 1952) Episode "Memento"
- The Texaco Star Theatre (aka The Milton Berle Show) (April 29, 1952) Guest
- Studio One CBS-TV Anthology show (May 19, 1952) Karloff played King Arthur in a radio play entitled A Connecticut Yankee in King Arthur's Court by Mark Twain; co-starred Thomas Mitchell
- Celebrity Time CBS-TV Quiz show (May 25, 1952) with Orson Bean and host Conrad Nagel
- Philip Morris Playhouse on Broadway (June 1, 1952) Karloff acted in a radio play called "Outward Bound"
- I've Got a Secret CBS-TV Quiz show (June 19, 1952)
- Curtain Call NBC-TV Anthology show (June 27, 1952) episode "Soul of the Great Bell"
- Schlitz Playhouse of Stars NBC-TV Anthology show (July 4, 1952) with Host Irene Dunne; Karloff acted in a radio play entitled "House of Death"
- Lux Video Theatre NBC-TV Anthology show (Dec. 8, 1952) Karloff and Bramwell Fletcher acted in a radio play entitled "Fear"
- Who's There? CBS-TV Quiz show (1952) with host Arlene Francis
- The Texaco Star Theatre (aka The Milton Berle Show) (Dec. 16, 1952) Guest
- All Star Revue Musical-Comedy show (Jan. 17, 1953) co-featuring Peter Lorre and Martha Raye
- Hollywood Opening Night NBC-TV Anthology show (March 2, 1953) Episode "The Invited Seven"
- Suspense CBS-TV Anthology show (Mar. 17, 1953) Episode The Black Prophet; Karloff played Rasputin
- Robert Montgomery Presents NBC-TV Anthology show (Mar. 30, 1953) Episode "Burden of Proof"
- **Tales of Tomorrow** Sci-fi Anthology show (Apr. 3, 1953) Karloff starred in an episode entitled "Past Tense"
- Quick as a Flash (May 7, 1953) Quiz Show
- Plymouth Playhouse (aka "ABC Album") ABC-TV Anthology show (May 25, 1953) with Host Cedric Hardwicke; Karloff starred in 2 episodes entitled "The Chaser" and "The Reticence of Lady Anne"
- Suspense CBS-TV Anthology show (June 23, 1953) episode "The Signal Man" (written by Charles Dickens)
- Rheingold Theatre NBC-TV Anthology show (1953) episode "House of Death"
- I've Got a Secret CBS-TV Quiz show (Oct. 13, 1954) appeared with Host Garry Moore, Bill Cullen and Kitty Carlisle
- The George Gobel Show (Nov. 6, 1954) Guest
- Truth or Consequences (Nov. 9, 1954) Guest
- Climax! CBS-TV Anthology show (Dec. 16, 1954) Episode The White Carnation, with Host William Lundigan
- Down You Go TV Quiz Show on the Dumont Network (Dec. 17, 1954) appeared with Phil Rizzuto and others
- **Colonel March of Scotland Yard** – 26-episode British TV series starring Karloff as a detective. First broadcast in the U.S. weekly from Dec. 1954-Spring, 1955; later broadcast in U.K. weekly from Sept. 24, 1955-March 17, 1956
- **The Best of Broadway** CBS-TV Anthology show (Jan. 5, 1955) Karloff acted in a TV version of "Arsenic and Old Lace", co-starring Peter Lorre, Helen Hayes, Orson Bean and Edward Everett Horton
- The Donald O'Connor Texaco Star Theatre NBC-TV Sitcom (Feb. 19, 1955) Karloff sang two songs, Arry and Erbert and The Human Thing To Do
- The Elgin Hour ABC-TV Anthology show (Feb. 22, 1955); Episode "The Sting of Death"
- Max Liebman Presents NBC-TV Musical Variety show (Mar. 12, 1955) a musical version of "A Connecticut Yankee in King Arthur's Court" by Mark Twain; Karloff performed two songs, co-featuring Eddie Albert
- Who Said That? TV Quiz Show on the Dumont Network (April 30, 1955) with host John K. M. McCaffrey
- General Electric Theatre CBS-TV Anthology show (May 1, 1955) with host Ronald Reagan; episode "Mr. Blue Ocean", co-starring Bramwell Fletcher, Eli Wallach, Susan Strasberg and Anthony Perkins
- Boris Karloff (July 15, 1955) British TV show about Karloff's life
- I've Got a Secret CBS-TV Quiz show (Aug. 24, 1955) with host Garry Moore, Bill Cullen and Kitty Carlisle
- The U.S. Steel Hour (aka Alcoa Hour) CBS-TV Anthology show (Aug. 31, 1955) episode "Counterfeit"
- The Alcoa Hour NBC-TV Anthology show (April 15, 1956) episode "Even the Weariest River", co-starring Christopher Plummer and Franchot Tone
- The Amazing Dunninger ABC-TV Mind-reading show (July 18, 1956) Guest
- Frankie Laine Time CBS-TV Musical Variety show (Aug. 1 and Aug. 8, 1956) Karloff performed on this variety show two weeks in a row
- The Ernie Kovacs Show NBC-TV Comedy show (Aug. 13, 1956) Guest
- Climax! CBS-TV Anthology show (Sept. 6, 1956) episode "Bury Me Later", with Torin Thatcher and Angela Lansbury
- Playhouse 90 CBS-TV Anthology show (Oct. 25, 1956) episode "Rendezvous in Black", by Cornell Woolrich.
- The Red Skelton Show CBS-TV Comedy show (Nov. 27, 1956) Guest
- The $64,000 Question CBS-TV Quiz show (December 11, 18 and 25, 1956) Karloff appeared three times and won $32,000 in the "Children's Fairy Tales" category
- The Rosemary Clooney Show NBC-TV Variety show (Jan. 9, 1957) Karloff played the Big Bad Wolf in a Little Red Riding Hood skit and sang a song called "You'd Be Surprised"
- **Hallmark Hall of Fame** NBC-TV Anthology show (Feb. 10, 1957) Karloff played Bishop Cauchon in a 90-minute Made-for-TV version of the play The Lark, co-starring Basil Rathbone, Julie Harris (as Joan of Arc), Denholm Elliott, Jack Warden and Eli Wallach
- Lux Video Theatre NBC-TV Anthology show (Apr. 25, 1957) Karloff played Montgomery Royle in an episode called "The Man Who Played God"
- The Kate Smith Special ABC-TV Variety show (Apr. 28, 1957) Karloff sang a song called "The September Song" on this program
- The Dinah Shore Chevy Show NBC-TV Variety show (May 17, 1957) Karloff sang "Mama Look a' Boo Boo" on this variety program
- A to Z (British TV show) (Aug. 30, 1957) Guest
- The Dinah Shore Chevy Show NBC-TV Variety show (Oct. 27, 1957) Karloff appeared in a Halloween skit; show co-featured the Skylarks and the Steiner Brothers
- The Rosemary Clooney Show NBC-TV Variety show (Halloween, 1957) Karloff did a musical number
- The Gisele MacKenzie Show (Nov. 16, 1957) Guest
- **This Is Your Life** (Nov. 20, 1957) Karloff was feted on this show which guest-starred Evelyn Karloff and makeup artist Jack Pierce among other people from Karloff's past; hosted by Ralph Edwards
- Suspicion NBC-TV Anthology show (Dec. 9, 1957) episode "The Deadly Game", co-starring Gary Merrill and Joseph Wiseman, hosted by Dennis O'Keefe; Karloff played Judge Withrop Gelsey
- The Betty White Show ABC-TV Variety show (Feb. 12, 1958) guest-starred Karloff and Buster Keaton among others
- **Telephone Time** ABC-TV Anthology show (Feb. 25, 1958) episode "The Vestris"; this episode was made as a pilot for Karloff's 1958 12-episode anthology series The Veil, but was shown separately from the other episodes on Telephone Time
- Shirley Temple's Storybook NBC-TV Anthology show for children (Mar. 5, 1958) Shirley Temple and John Ericson costarred in this one-hour TV version of "The Legend of Sleepy Hollow", narrated by Boris Karloff
- Studio One CBS-TV Anthology show (March 31, 1958) Karloff played as Professor Theodore Koenig in the episode "The Shadow of a Genius"
- The Jack Paar Show NBC-TV Talk Show (aka The Tonight Show)(April 22, 1958) Jack Paar interviewed Karloff
- **The Veil** (1958) 12-episode Anthology show (similar to The Twilight Zone) produced by Hal Roach Jr; Karloff hosted each episode and starred in all but one of them (Jack the Ripper); the series was never broadcast nor syndicated, but is available today on DVD (several episodes were later re-edited into 3 different feature-length films to be shown on late night TV)
- Playhouse 90 CBS-TV Anthology show (Nov. 6, 1958) Karloff played Captain Kurtz in this 90-minute Made-for-TV version of "Heart of Darkness" by Joseph Conrad; co-starring Eartha Kitt, Oscar Homolka and Roddy McDowall
- The Gale Storm Show CBS-TV sitcom (Jan. 31, 1959) co-starring Zasu Pitts in an episode entitled "It's Murder, My Dear"
- General Electric Theatre (aka GE Theatre) - CBS-TV Anthology show (May 17, 1959) hosted by Ronald Reagan; Karloff plays Henry Church in an episode called "Indian Giver", co-starring Edgar Buchanan and Jackie Coogan
- Playhouse 90 CBS-TV Anthology show (Feb. 9, 1960) Karloff played a character named Guibert in an episode called "To the Sound of Trumpets", costarring Judith Anderson, Stephen Boyd and Sam Jaffe
- The Du Pont Show of the Month CBS-TV Anthology show (Mar. 5, 1960) produced by David Susskind; Karloff played a pirate named "Billy Bones" in this 90-minute Made-for-TV adaptation of Robert Louis Stevenson's "Treasure Island", co-starring Michael Gough and Barry Morse, among others.
- Hollywood Sings NBC-TV Variety show (April 3, 1960) Karloff sang a song on this program, which co-featured Eddie Albert and Tammy Grimes
- Upgreen and At' em: or, A Maiden Nearly Over (British TV show) (June 6, 1960) Guest
- **The Secret World of Eddie Hodges** - CBS-TV Musical Special (June 23, 1960) – A one-hour Musical Special directed in N.Y. City by Norman Jewison, featuring Boris Karloff (as Capt. Hook), Margaret Hamilton, Bert Lahr, Hugh O'Brien and others, narrated by Jackie Gleason.
- **Thriller** NBC-TV Anthology show (Sept. 13, 1960-April 30, 1962) Sixty-six hour-long episode B&W series hosted by Karloff, who also acted in five of the episodes themselves: "The Premature Burial" (10/2/60), "The Prediction" (11/22/60), "Last of the Sommervilles" (11/6/61), "Dialogues with Death" which consisted of two 30-minute stories (12/4/61), and "The Incredible Dr. Markesan" (2/26/62); the other episodes were only hosted by Karloff
- The Hallmark Hall of Fame NBC-TV Anthology show (Feb. 5, 1962) Karloff acted in this 90-minute Made-for-TV adaptation of "Arsenic and Old Lace", co-starring Tony Randall, Tom Bosley, Mildred Natwick and others; Karloff played Jonathan Brewster
- PM syndicated Talk Show (Feb. 12, 1962) Mike Wallace interviewed Karloff, Tony Randall, Kim Hunter, Ed Wynn and Julie Harris.
- Theatre '62 NBC-TV Anthology show (Mar. 11, 1962) Karloff played a character named Simon Flaquer in an episode entitled "The Paradine Case", co-starring Richard Basehart, Robert Webber and Viveca Lindfors
- The Dickie Henderson Show a British Variety show (June 1962) Karloff appeared on this show while he was filming Out of this World in England
- **Out of This World** – ABC-TV British Sci-Fi Anthology show produced in England by BBC-TV (broadcast June 30-Sept. 22, 1962) Thirteen one-hour episodes hosted by Karloff; stories adapted from the works of John Wyndham, Terry Nation, Isaac Asimov, Philip K. Dick and others (Karloff filmed these immediately after the Thriller TV series ended production.)
- **Route 66** CBS-TV Drama show (Oct. 26, 1962) Karloff appeared as the Frankenstein Monster in this episode entitled "Lizard's Leg and Owlet's Wing", co-starring Lon Chaney Jr. (as The Wolf Man/ Mummy), Peter Lorre, Martin Milner and George Maharis.
- I've Got a Secret Game Show (Jan. 28, 1963) Guest
- The Hy Gardner Show WOR-TV Talk Show (March 3, 1963) Karloff and Peter Lorre were both interviewed in this episode
- Chronicle CBS-TV Documentary show (Christmas Day, 1963) Karloff narrated "A Danish Fairy Tale" (a biography of Hans Christian Andersen)
- Today's Teens (Jan., 1964) 11-minute newsreel feature narrated by Karloff
- The Garry Moore Show CBS-TV Variety show (Apr. 21, 1964) also featuring Alan King and Dorothy Loudon
- The Tonight Show Starring Johnny Carson (NBC-TV talk show) (June, 1964) Guest
- The Entertainers CBS-TV Variety show (Jan. 16, 1965) also featuring Carol Burnett and Art Buchwald
- Shindig ABC-TV Musical show (Oct. 30, 1965) Karloff sang The Peppermint Twist and The Monster Mash; also costarred Ted Cassidy and "Shindig" host Jimmy O'Neill
- **The Wild Wild West** CBS-TV Western program (Sept. 23, 1966) Karloff played a villain named Singh on an episode entitled "Night of the Golden Cobra", co-starred Robert Conrad and Ross Martin
- **The Girl from U.N.C.L.E.** NBC-TV Adventure series (Sept. 27, 1966) Karloff played a transvestite character named Mother Muffin in an episode entitled "The Mother Muffin Affair", co-starring Stefanie Powers, Leo G. Carroll, Robert Vaughn and Noel Harrison
- **Dr. Seuss' How the Grinch Stole Christmas** - 30-minute CBS-TV animated cartoon (broadcast Dec. 18, 1966) - narrated by Karloff who also does the voice of the Grinch; directed by Chuck Jones, this animated TV Special won Grammy Award for Best Album for Children
- I Spy NBC-TV Adventure series (Sept. 24, 1968) Karloff travelled to Spain to play Don Ernesto Silvando in this episode entitled "Mainly on the Plains", co-starring Robert Culp, Bill Cosby and (future Spanish horror film star) Paul Naschy in an uncredited bit part
- The Red Skelton Show CBS-TV Variety show (Sept. 24, 1968) Karloff and Vincent Price sung a duet called "The Two of Us" on this show, and acted together in a skit called "He Who Steals My Robot Steals Trash"
- The Jonathan Winters Show CBS-TV Variety show (Oct. 30, 1968) Karloff sang "It Was a Very Good Year" on this program, which also featured Agnes Moorehead, Abby Dalton, Alice Ghostly, Paul Lynde and others
- The Name of the Game NBC-TV adventure series (Nov. 29, 1968) Karloff played a character called Mikhail Orlov in this 90-minute episode entitled "The White Birch", co-starring Susan Saint James, Roddy McDowall, Gene Barry, Peter Deuel, Ben Gazzara, Richard Jaeckel and Susan Oliver; this was Karloff's final dramatic performance, broadcast just weeks before his death.

=== Appearances on Starring Boris Karloff ===
Karloff acted in 13 episodes of the "Starring Boris Karloff" anthology TV/ radio series in 1949: this show was broadcast as both a TV show and a radio show simultaneously

- "Five Golden Guineas" (Sept. 21, 1949)
- "The Mask" (Sept. 28, 1949)
- "Mungahara" (Oct. 5, 1949)
- "Mad Illusion" (Oct. 12, 1949)
- "Perchance To Dream" (Oct. 19, 1949)
- "The Devil Takes a Bride" (Oct. 26, 1949)
- "The Moving Finger" (Nov. 2, 1949)
- "The Twisted Path" (Nov. 9, 1949)
- "False Face" (Nov. 16, 1949)
- "Cranky Bill" (Nov. 23, 1949)
- "Three O'Clock" (Nov. 30, 1949)
- "The Shop at Sly Corner" (Dec. 7, 1949)
- "The Night Reveals" (Dec. 14, 1949)

== Stage performances (from 1928 on) ==
- The Idiot (January 25–28, 1928) Belmont Theatre, Los Angeles
- Monna Vanna (April 23-May 2, 1928) Karloff played Guido Collona; Los Angeles
- For the Soul of Rafael (opened May 3, 1928) Los Angeles
- Hotel Imperial (opened May 23, 1928) Karloff played General Juskievica; Los Angeles
- Window Panes (opened Aug. 5, 1928) Karloff played Artem Tiapkin; Los Angeles
- Kongo (1929) Karloff played "Kregg" at the Capitol Theatre in San Francisco
- The Criminal Code (Opened May 12, 1930) Karloff played "Galloway" in San Francisco and Los Angeles in 1930 (he reprised the role in the 1931 film version the following year).
- Mud, Blood and Kisses (Nov. 17, 1934) Karloff appeared in this one-night performance in Padua, California
- The Drunkard (Oct. 19, 1936) Karloff appeared as a guest-star for one night in this play at the Theatre Mart in Hollywood, to celebrate the play's 1200th performance
- The Tell-Tale Heart (1938) Karloff toured with this play in April 1938, which he only narrated
- Arsenic and Old Lace (beginning Dec. 26, 1940) Karloff starred as Jonathan Brewster for 2 weeks in Baltimore, Md.
- Arsenic and Old Lace (Jan. 10, 1941-June, 1942) Fulton Theatre and West Point Military Academy in N.Y.; co-starred with Josephine Hull and Wyrley Birch
- Night of the Stars (Nov. 26, 1941) appeared for one night at Madison Square Garden, NY
- The Navy Relief Show (Mar. 10, 1942) played at Madison Square Garden, NY for one night, with Eddie Cantor, Danny Kaye, Ed Wynn, Clifton Webb and Vincent Price
- Arsenic and Old Lace (Aug. 17, 1942-Jan. 28, 1944) on tour (Los Angeles, San Francisco, Chicago, Milwaukee, Boston, Washington DC, Seattle, Kansas City, and back to Washington DC and Kansas City again)
- Arsenic and Old Lace (Feb. to June, 1945) U.S.O. Pacific tour (Midway, Oahu, Marshall Islands, etc.)
- On Borrowed Time (Nov. 5-Nov. 24, 1946) Karloff played "Gramps" in San Francisco and Los Angeles
- The Linden Tree (Feb 4-Mar. 6, 1948) toured Connecticut, Pennsylvania, Washington DC, and at The Music Box Theatre in N.Y.; co-starred Una O'Connor and Noel Leslie
- On Borrowed Time (March, 1947) played "Gramps" again for one week in Mexico City
- The Shop at Sly Corner (December 25, 1948-Jan. 22, 1949) played Boston, Mass. and the Booth Theater in N.Y.; co-starred Una O'Connor, Jay Robinson
- On Borrowed Time (Jan. 16, 1950-Feb. 4, 1950) played "Gramps" again at the Penthouse Theater in Atlanta, Georgia
- Peter Pan (April 24, 1950 – January 27, 1951) ran 321 performances at the Imperial and St. James Theatres in N.Y., co-starred Jean Arthur as Peter Pan, Karloff as Captain Hook, Marcia Henderson as Wendy, and Nehemiah Persoff as Cecco
- Peter Pan (Jan. 27, 1951-Apr. 29, 1951) toured as Captain Hook in Boston, Cincinnati, Cleveland, Detroit and Minneapolis
- Night of 100 Stars (June 25, 1955) Karloff played a drunken butler at a one-night fundraiser for the Actors' Orphanage at the London Palladium in England
- The Lark (Oct. 28, 1955-Nov. 12, 1955) Karloff played Bishop Cauchon at the Plymouth Theatre in Boston
- The Lark (Nov. 17, 1955-June 2, 1956) ran 229 performances at the Longacre Theater in N.Y.; featuring Julie Harris as Joan of Arc, Karloff as Bishop Cauchon, Christopher Plummer as Warwick, and Joseph Wiseman as the Inquisitor
- The Lark (opened Sept. 5, 1956) played approximately 3 weeks in San Francisco
- Arsenic and Old Lace (March 21–23, 1957) played Jonathan Brewster for 3 days at a high school in Anchorage, Alaska
- Arsenic and Old Lace (Jan. 12–17, 1960) Tapia Theatre in San Juan, Puerto Rico
- On Borrowed Time (opened Jan. 17, 1961) played "Gramps" at the Tapia Theatre in San Juan, Puerto Rico
- On Borrowed Time (March 17–25, 1961) played "Gramps" at the Wharf Theatre in Monterey, Cal.; Karloff's final stage play
