= Half an Hour =

1920 film by Harley Knoles

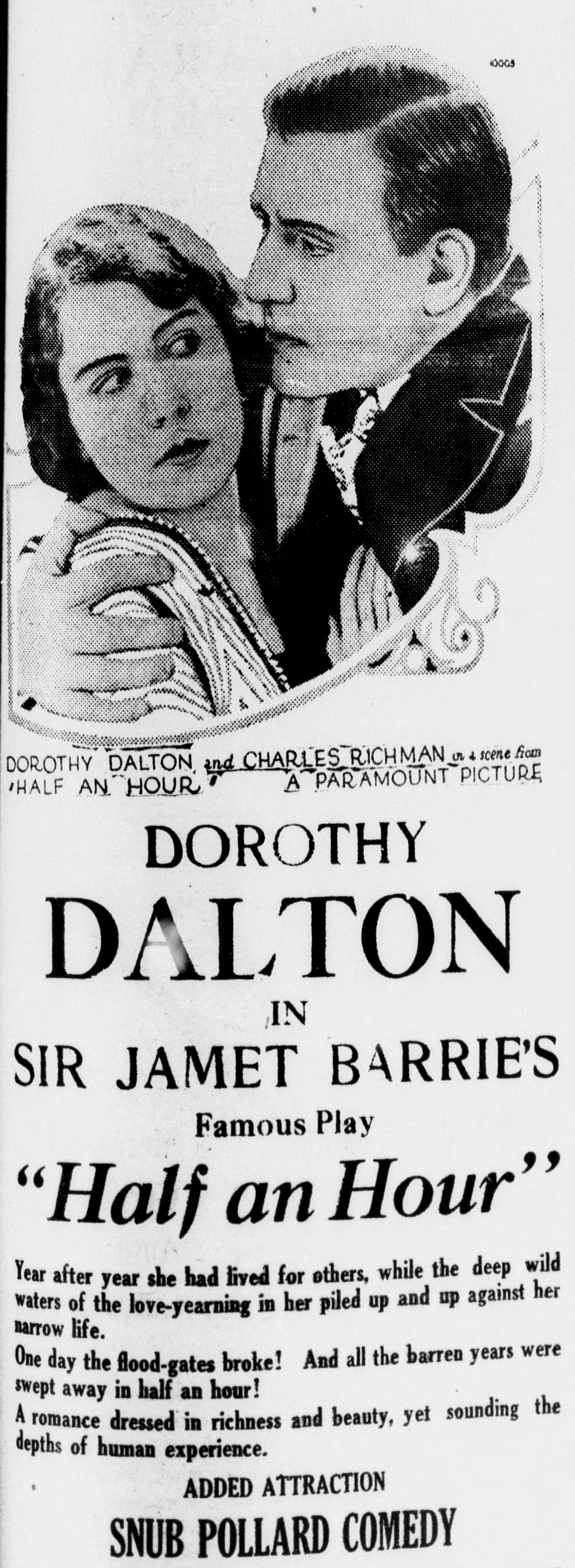
- Contemporary advertisement
- Directed by: Harley Knoles
- Screenplay by: Clara Beranger
- Based on: Half an Hour by J. M. Barrie
- Produced by: Adolph Zukor
- Starring: Dorothy Dalton; Charles Richman; Albert L. Barrett; Frank Losee; H. Cooper Cliffe
- Cinematography: Philip Hatkin
- Production company: Famous Players–Lasky Corporation
- Distributed by: Paramount Pictures
- Release date: September 19, 1920; (Limited release)
- Running time: 50 minutes
- Country: United States
- Language: Silent (English intertitles)

Half an Hour is a 1920 American silent drama film directed by Harley Knoles and written by Clara Beranger. The film stars Dorothy Dalton, Charles Richman, Albert L. Barrett, Frank Losee, and H. Cooper Cliffe. It is based on the 1913 play Half an Hour by J. M. Barrie. The film was released on September 19, 1920, by Paramount Pictures.

== Plot ==
As described in a film magazine, Lady Lillian Garson, whose marriage to man of wealth Richard Garson has been in name only and the result of parental pressure, decides after an unpleasant meeting with her husband to take up the proposal of Hugh Paton and go with him to Egypt. He is due to sail within half an hour of the time she made her decision, so she leaves a note for her husband, takes the jewels he has given her, and makes her way to Paton's quarters, which are "just across the square." Paton leaves his apartment to get a cab and is struck by an automobile and killed. Dr. George Brodie, a friend of her husband's whom she has not met, brings the body into the house. Lady Lillian returns to her home, hoping to cover up her secret. She is successful in this, though she meets Dr. Brodie at dinner with her husband, and the doctor does not disclose the facts of the case. Destroying the note she had left behind, she happily realizes for the first time the greatness of her husband's love for her.

== Cast ==
- Dorothy Dalton as Lady Lillian Garson
- Charles Richman as Richard Garson
- Albert L. Barrett as Hugh Paton
- Frank Losee as Dr. George Brodie
- H. Cooper Cliffe as Earl of Westford

== Preservation ==
With no prints of Half an Hour located in any film archives, it is considered a lost film.
