= List of Canadian films of the 1920s =

This is a list of Canadian films that were released in the 1920s.

| Title | Director | Cast | Genre | Notes |
|---|---|---|---|---|
1920
| The Great Shadow | Harley Knoles | Tyrone Power Sr., Dorothy Bernard | Anti-Red drama | |
1921
| Cameron of the Royal Mounted | Henry MacRae | Gaston Glass, Vivienne Osborne, Irving Cummings | Drama | Produced by Ernest Shipman. A third of the original footage exists in the National Archives. |
| God's Crucible | Henry MacRae | Gaston Glass, Wilton Lackaye | Drama | Produced by Ernest Shipman. |
1922
| Canadian Government Arctic Expedition of 1922 | George Valiquette | | | |
| Madeleine de Verchères | Joseph-Arthur Homier | Estelle Bélanger, Adrien Lefebvre | Drama | No print of this early Canadian film is known to exist. |
| The Man from Glengarry | Henry MacRae | Anders Randolph | Drama | Produced by Ernest Shipman. |
| Nanook of the North | Robert Flaherty | Allakariallak, Nyla, Cunayou, Allee | Documentary | Arguably the most famous film ever shot in Canada, Nanook of the North is technically not Canadian; although, in spirit it certainly is. The money to finance the film came from France. |
| The Rapids | David Hartford | Mary Astor, Harry Morey, Walter Miller, Charles Wellesley | Drama | Produced by Ernest Shipman. |
1923
| Canadian Government Arctic Expedition of 1923 | George Valiquette | | | |
| Glengarry School Days | Henry MacRae | Pauline Garon | Drama | Produced by Ernest Shipman. |
1924
| Blue Water | David Hartford | Norma Shearer, Pierre Gendron | Drama | |
| Canadian Government Arctic Expedition of 1924 | Roy Tash | | | |
1925
| Canadian Government Arctic Expedition of 1925 | George Valiquette | | | |
1926
| La Drogue fatale (also known as The Fatal Drug) | Joseph-Arthur Homier | Paul Lefrançois | Drama | The film was released only in Quebec and no print is known to exist. Homier is regarded as the first Quebec director of feature films. |
1927
| Policing the Plains | A. D. Kean | Jack Boyd, Ira Boyd, Joe Fleiger, Dorothy Fowler, Senior Heaton, Margaret Lougheed. | Docudrama | Feature film about the history of the Royal Northwest Mounted Police, based on the book of the same name by Rev. R. G. MacBeth. Filmed in BC, Alberta, Saskatchewan and Ontario, April 1924-September 1927. Lost. |
1928
| The Beaver People | Bill Oliver | Grey Owl | Short | The first of several films featuring Archie Belaney, the Englishman who claimed First Nations heritage. The Grey Owl films were made during the late 1920s and 1930s for the National Parks of Canada. |
| Carry on, Sergeant! | Bruce Bairnsfather | Hugh Buckler, Jimmie Savo, Nancy Ann Hargreaves, | First World War drama | |
| His Destiny | Neal Hart | Neal Hart, Barbara Kent, Charles Wellesley | Drama | The film features footage shot at the Calgary Stampede. |
| In the Shadow of the Pole | Richard Fennie | | Documentary | |
1929
| The Devil Bear | Louis Chaudet | Dorothy Dwan, Carroll Nye | Horror/Drama | |
