= Faith Green =

American screenwriter

- Born: Faith Emily Wheeler; Between June 8 and 30, 1869; British India
- Died: June 8, 1933; aged 63 or 64; Bronx, New York, U.S.
- Other name: Faith Wheeler Green
- Occupations: Screenwriter, journalist
- Spouse: Franklin D. Green

Faith Green (born Faith Emily Wheeler; June 1869 - June 8, 1933) was an American screenwriter active during Hollywood's silent era. She worked with directors like David Hartford, King Vidor, and Henry McRae.

== Early life and career ==
Born Faith Emily Wheeler in British India, between June 8 and June 30, 1869, Green was the eldest of eight children born to Esther E. (née Sackett) and the Rev. Francis Marion Wheeler. Brought to the United States while still an infant by her parents, Faith, as the eldest, may well have been asked to provide substantial assistance in caring for her younger siblings. In any event, no reporting appears to have been done, either contemporaneous or retrospective, regarding the particulars of her schooling, much less any early portents of theatrical aspirations and their subsequent realization.

Green got her start as a journalist in New York City before turning to screenwriting; she also served as secretary of the New York Pen & Brush Club.

Mrs. Green resided in New York but also worked extensively in Canada. She was also valued due to her editing skills and knowledge of censor boards in the U.S. and Canada.

She spent time with Ralph Connor and adapted many of his novels for the big screen. At one point, she was in talks with Canada's Lady Byng of Vimy to adapt a story into a film, but this doesn't seem to have come to fruition.

== Personal life and death ==
On June 15, 1892, Faith Wheeler became Mrs. Faith Wheeler Green, wife of architect Franklin A. Green. (Note: When they moved to New York, Green served as deputy architect of the New York City Board of Education.) Within well under three years, the entire next generation of Greens had arrived, two daughters and one son.

On June 8, 1933, (having conceivably just turned 64, but undeniably destined to do so at some point that month (Note: Although her obituary unambiguously and prominently displays 59 as her age at time of death, leading one to posit 1873 or '74 as the possible year of birth, this apparent concession to vanity is clearly outweighed by the relevant answers given by her parents' on the 1880 Census form (specifically, stating that Faith was then 10 years old—and thus, born in either 1869 or '70), and, better yet, by Green's own answer on the 1900 form, which allows her not only to specify both the month—June—and year—1869—of her birth, but to stipulate that, as of the date of that page's enumeration, she had not yet turned 31.)), Green died, following a long illness, at Montefiore Hospital in the Bronx. Predeceased by both her husband—in 1914—and, even before that, her daughter, Lucy, (Note: This is merely the unfortunate but unavoidable inference to be drawn from Lucy Augusta's absence from the listed survivors in either of her parents' obituaries.) she was survived by her other two children, Mrs. Grace Farmhold and Guy Wheeler Green.

== Selected filmography ==
- The Sky Pilot (1921)
- God's Crucible (1921)
- Cameron of the Royal Mounted (1921)
- The Rapids (1922)
- The Man from Glengarry (1922)
- Glengarry School Days (1923)
- Blue Water (1924)
