= Captain Salvation =

Captain Salvation may refer to:

- Captain Salvation, a novel by Frederick William Wallace
- Captain Salvation (film), a 1927 film adaptation of the novel
