= Glengarry School Days =

- Directed by: Henry MacRae
- Written by: Ralph Connor (novel); Faith Green; Kenneth O'Hara
- Produced by: Ernest Shipman
- Starring: Harlan Knight; James Harrison; Pauline Garon
- Cinematography: Barney McGill
- Production company: Ottawa Film Productions
- Distributed by: W.W. Hodkinson Distribution
- Release date: June 17, 1923
- Country: Canada
- Languages: Silent; English intertitles

Glengarry School Days is a 1923 Canadian silent drama film directed by Henry MacRae and starring Harlan Knight, James Harrison and Pauline Garon. It is based on the novel of the same title by Ralph Connor. It was distributed in the United States by Hodkinson Pictures with the alternative title of The Critical Age.

It was the last of three pictures based on works by Connor directed by MacRae for Canadian producer Ernest Shipman following Cameron of the Royal Mounted and The Man from Glengarry.

== Cast ==
- Harlan Knight as Peter Gorach
- James Harrison as Tom Finley
- Alice May as Mrs. Finley
- Pauline Garon as Margie Baird
- Wallace Ray as Bob Kerr
- Raymond Peck as Sen. Morgan Kerr
- William Colvin as Senator Baird
- Marion Colvin as Mrs. Baird

== Bibliography ==
- Goble, Alan. The Complete Index to Literary Sources in Film. Walter de Gruyter, 1999.
