= Frances Eldridge =

Silent film actress

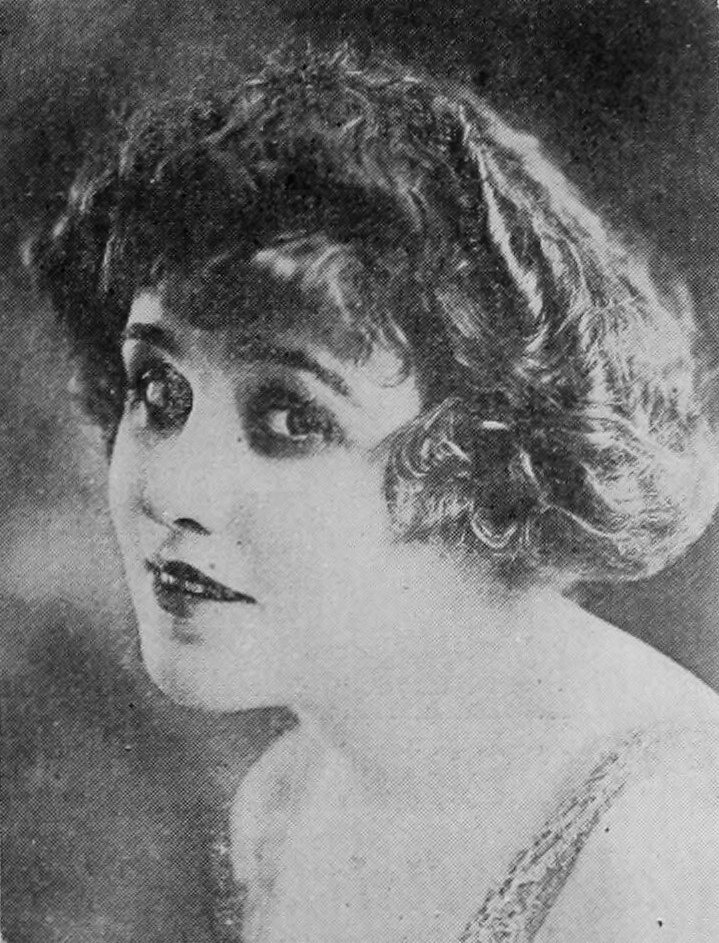
Frances Eldridge

Frances Eldridge was a stage and screen actor in the silent era of cinema. She appeared in short films made on the East Coast before Hollywood rose to dominance.

Frances Eldridge was born in Staten Island, New York City, to parents who were both stage actors.

Eldridge began in stage acting, with an appearance in The Bashful Hero with Ernest Truex, before moving into motion pictures in 1920. She later claimed to have won a newspaper competition that led to a role in The Half-Way Girl with Doris Kenyon but this film was released in 1925 so it was likely she was citing a more recent role for publicity purposes.

Her first appearance was probably in Madonnas and Men by B. A. Rolfe, produced by the Peerless Pictures Studios at Fort Lee, New Jersey. She appeared in two further Rolfe films: Wings of Pride and A Good Woman. From this, she was cast by Henry MacRae in God's Crucible (also known as The Foreigner).

By late October 1920, Eldridge had signed to Superior Pictures Corporation to appear in two two-reel comedies a month. The first of these was The Little Liar. In November she was sent to the motion picture exhibition in Atlanta, Georgia, along with other stars such as Lillian Gish. One day of the exhibition was declared Frances Eldridge Day and culminated in a ball.

However, by March 1921, Eldridge brought a lawsuit against World Motion Pictures for failure to pay for her time or costumes in The Little Liar.

In July 1921 she was reported to be considering an offer to enter vaudeville. Her last appearance on stage is as 'Friquette' in The Red Poppy, alongside Bela Lugosi in his first US stage appearance, in December 1922.

She then left acting to tour Europe, returning to America and the stage in 1925, where she appeared with Ernest Truex again in Six Cylinder Love.

== Stage roles ==
- The Bashful Hero
- Lady Friends
- Turn to the Right
- Johnny, Get Your Gun
- Six Cylinder Love

== Filmography ==
- Madonnas and Men (1920)
- Wings of Pride (1920)
- A Good Woman (1920)
- The Little Liar (tbc)
- God's Crucible / The Foreigner (1921)
- The Little Outcast / Are Children to Blame? (1922)
- The Half-Way Girl (1925)
- A Busy Cinderella (1927)
