= Ralph Connor =

Canadian novelist (1860–1937)

The Reverend Ralph Connor CMG
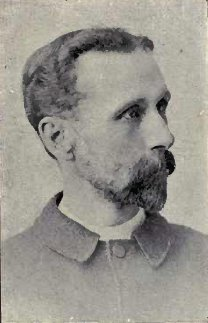
- Born: Charles William Gordon; September 13, 1860; Glengarry County, Canada West
- Died: October 31, 1937 (aged 77); Winnipeg, Manitoba, Canada
- Education: University of Toronto
- Children: J. King Gordon (son) and 6 daughters
- Relatives: Charles Gordon (grandson); Alison Gordon (granddaughter)
- Writing career
- Pen name: Ralph Connor

Charles William Gordon, CMG (September 13, 1860 – October 31, 1937), also known as Ralph Connor, was a Canadian novelist, using the Connor pen name while maintaining his status as a church leader, first in the Presbyterian and later the United Church in Canada.

Gordon was born in Glengarry County, Canada West. He was the son of Rev. Daniel Gordon and Mary Robertson Gordon. His father was a Free Church of Scotland Missionary in Upper Canada. While at Knox College, Gordon was inspired by a lecture given by Superintendent Robertson about the challenges in the West, leading him to pursue his summer mission work there, and ultimately to spend his life on reform and mission work in Western Canada. Gordon's views were largely shaped by Robertson, who believed that the settlers' lax attitudes towards irregular church services and lukewarm spirituality could only be remedied by missionaries. Gordon felt called to be one of these missionaries and establish not only churches, but Christian social and moral reform in Western Canada. To this end, Gordon completed his theological training in Edinburgh, Scotland, where he was even further affirmed in his desire to bring the church to Western Canada. The theological atmosphere in Scotland during the 1870s and 1880s was increasingly liberal. This movement towards harmonizing traditional Christian doctrine with modern advancements, such as science and evolution, greatly appealed to Gordon. He became an influential proponent of social reform in the West, as well as for the union of the churches. The union, which resulted in the formation of the United Church of Canada in the 1920s, was a response to the increasing liberalization and secularization growing in prevalence especially in Canada.

Gordon's views of Western Canada were intricately connected to his views of religion and Christianity. His social and reform work were rooted in his call to ministry and his desire to see Canada united both in faith and in Nation.

The difficulties on the mission fields of the Canadian West were motivating factors for his fiction writing, and he successfully had many of his writings published and sold.

== Personal life ==
=== Family history ===
Charles William Gordon's parents were Rev. Daniel Gordon (1822–1910) and Mary Gordon (née Robertson; d. 1890).

Glengarry County, Ontario, where Charles would be born, was backwoods country, situated on the St. Lawrence River, and composed of Scottish immigrants. It was characterized by the Scottish virtues of religion, hard-work, and stern Calvinism, but with the addition of wry wit and a passion for theological debates. It was these theological debates that led to the division of the Presbyterian Church. In 1843, dissenters in the established Presbyterian Church of Scotland (the Auld Kirk), seceded and formed the Free Church of Scotland. It was this new Free Church that upheld the goal to send missionaries to Canada. The dissension affected several Presbyterian congregations in Glengarry County, most prominently the Free Church congregation at Indian Lands (named for the original land tracts which were leased from St. Regis Mohawk Tribe), led by Rev. Daniel Gordon since 1853. Rev. Daniel Gordon had a reputation as a fiery Highland preacher who inspired both fear and awe with his sermons on sin and the final judgement. Daniel Gordon's passion was animated by his very strong belief in the spirit world, but his greatest passion was the "Love of the Cross." As Charles said of his own father, "Not one of all the great preachers I have known could ever thrill my soul as could my father when I was a little lad."

A strict disciplinarian, Daniel Gordon ruled with respect and rarely had to resort to punishing his children. His frequent absences, however, as he traveled to other Parishes, meant that the duty of discipline fell to his wife, Mary. In his autobiography, Charles Gordon remembered that his mother's discipline was mild but never failed to fill him with remorse: after chastising, she would make her children kneel in prayer with her. As Gordon described, "no matter how filled with anger my heart might be, before the prayer was ended the love and grief in her voice and the tears in her eyes never failed to break me up."

The Indian Lands church, where Charles was born, shared a building with an Auld Kirk congregation. Conflict eventually boiled over, causing the Auld Kirk congregation to lock the doors, barring Daniel Gordon's congregation out. In response, Daniel kicked the doors in and proceeded with his service. He was brought up on charges, though never convicted, and the Free Church congregation was forced to find a building of their own. Daniel Gordon also had a sense of humour and was both liked and respected. Charles Gordon drew much inspiration and virtue from his father for his strong yet loving personality and skill as a preacher.

Mary Gordon came from a scholarly family and was granted the education that most girls were denied in this Victorian period. After completing her early education at Sherbrooke Young Ladies' Academy in Canada East, Mary went on to Mount Holyoke Ladies' Seminary in New England. She excelled in English, mathematics, and philosophy; so much so that she was invited to be principal at the young age of 22. Although the position was a great honour, Mary ultimately decided not to accept the offer in favour of remaining at home in Sherbrooke. It was there that she later met and married the young Presbyterian minister Daniel Gordon. Together, Mary and Daniel moved to Indian Lands, where Charles was born and raised.

=== Early life and education ===
Charles William Gordon was born in Glengarry County, Ontario, on September 13, 1860, the fourth son to Rev. Daniel Gordon (1822–1910) and Mary Gordon (née Robertson; d. 1890).

According to Keith Wilson, "The Christian warmth of his home, the surrounding forests of pine and balsams, the hard physical life of the settlers and the carefree gaiety of the youngsters were all integral parts of his education." His formal education began in the pine log schoolhouse at Athol. The schoolhouse itself represented the settlers of Canada West: sturdy yet poor. The education Charles received was strongly Scottish. The schoolmaster was both loved and feared, and always respected. It was during this time, as Charles grew into his love for learning, that the British colonies of North America were on their way to Confederation. Indian Lands was 25 miles from the nearest railway station. The community was isolated, and Charles had very little recollection of these political changes later in his life.

In 1870, his father was called to Zorra in Oxford County, where the congregation was Highlander mixed with Lowland and English. This move brought Charles into proximity to more formal civilization, the village of Harrington being close by. It was here that Charles continued his elementary schooling, with an emphasis on preparing for admission into high school. Charles thrived under this new challenge and developed ambition in both scholarship and organized sports.

Charles attended high school at St. Mary's in Harrington, Ontario. Because it was a 10-mile drive, he and his siblings had to board in town during the week, returning on Fridays for the weekend and the "steadying influence of home." Schooling at this time in Canada West was expensive, and Daniel Gordon could not afford to send his boys on his own salary. The boys thus hired themselves out during the summers to local farmers and were able to help pay their own way. As Wilson summarizes, "Determination and hard-work became characteristic of young Charles, and these qualities assured his success at St. Mary's Collegiate Institute where he first met the challenge of classical scholarship." It was here that Charles developed a fervent appreciation for language through his studies of Latin and Greek poetry. In 1879, he completed his High school degree with first class honours in English, mathematics, and classics, giving him a firm foundation for his university career at the University of Toronto.

Like many other young men in the area, Gordon went to Toronto and received theological training at Knox College at the University of Toronto where he completed a B.A. and graduated with distinction in 1886. He then went on to study in Edinburgh, where he became deeply troubled by higher criticism and sought guidance from his mentors, A.B. Davidson, Marcus Dodds, Alexander Whyte, and Henry Drummond who all believed in a new attitude and views of the West.

=== Later life and family ===
In 1890, the sudden death of Gordon's mother, who had been such a strong and positive influence in his life, was a life-altering event for Gordon.

He met his wife, Helen King, while at college. He and his brother attended the church where her father, Dr. King, was minister during his college and university days in Toronto. Later, when Gordon had taken up the position offered to him in Winnipeg, he was reacquainted with Helen who had moved out West with her family when Dr. King was given the position of first principal of Manitoba College. They were married in Toronto in 1899. As Wilson has summarized, "With her strong convictions, efficiency and dedication, she was to prove a source of real strength to him." Together, they had one son (J. King Gordon) and six daughters. All of their children graduated from the University of Manitoba, continuing on the strong scholarly legacy of their parents. Despite Gordon's many duties, he remained close to his family at all times.

Gordon continued working right up until a few days before his death on October 31, 1937. His passion for preaching, ministering to spiritual needs, and serving social reform never abated.

== Career ==
=== Religion and ministerial career ===
While attending the University of Toronto, Gordon was inspired by a lecture given by Reverend James Robertson, the Presbyterian superintendent of missions to Manitoba and the North West. His passionate discussion of missions to Canada West caught Gordon's attention, so much so that Gordon volunteered to spend the spring and summer of 1885 in a mission field in Manitoba. There, Gordon was set the task of organizing parish life for the settlers in the province created by Louis Riel's last armed resistance. After the summer, Gordon went back home to the East, but later returned West, answering what he perceived to be the call on his life to minister to Canada West. As author and historian Christopher Dummitt has explained, "His future success was built on this decision."

During this time, the church was undergoing significant upheaval due to controversies posed by scientific developments. The role of theology was called into question, specifically by Higher Criticism. While in Edinburgh, Gordon became greatly troubled by Higher Criticism teaching and sought counsel from his mentors A.B. Davidson, Marcus Dodds, Alexander Whyte, and especially Henry Drummond. What appealed to Gordon was that these men were able to find a balance between tradition and modern advancements, reconciling the conflicts the two seemed to pose. Scientific advancements and biblical criticism could be acknowledged without sacrificing what they saw to be the core of Christianity: the need for salvation and the preaching of personal conversion. Whyte, in particular, influenced Gordon's struggle with Higher Criticism by reminding him, "You are to be a minister, see that you feed your people. Never mind your theological, your scientific, your higher critical problems. Keep them for your study." Gordon was greatly assured by this appeal to the common people and was reaffirmed in his calling to "save souls." This "pragmatic Protestantism" was popular at the time in Canada West, where the focus on individual salvation was emphasized.

Upon his return from Scotland, Gordon was ordained in a small service in June 1890. He was then appointed missionary around what is now Banff, Alberta. He spent three years trying to reform and improve the lives of rough country miners, lumbermen, and ranchers. Gordon held to the Scottish emphasis on school and church as the means to making society more spiritual. He worked diligently in social reform measures, including advocating for improved living conditions on the work camps. Essential to this, Gordon believed, was the introduction of Temperance and the elimination of the vice of alcohol. Gordon retained an "optimistic belief in the possibility of individual salvation."

In the mid 1890s, Gordon settled down in Winnipeg, Manitoba, as Minister at St. Stephen's Parish. He continued to live out his missionary ideals through his novels, especially Black Rock (1898) and Sky Pilot (1900). Gordon viewed himself first and foremost as a minister, serving the spiritual needs of his congregation in Winnipeg, but also with a view to serving beyond this area to the entire province, and, indeed, the nation. He thus engaged himself in projects which would now be considered part of the social gospel movement. Gordon served on the Social Service Council of Manitoba as well as on the Social Service Committee of the Presbyterian Church of Canada. Through these, he continued to fight for temperance legislation, and continued to promote social reform that would help with poverty, health services, and immigration.

At this time, the church was struggling with a decline in attendance and membership. Methodists and Presbyterians especially focused on this problem, as they viewed church growth to be integral to their sense of history. It was through progress and growth that these denominations were affirmed in their mission, and thus they felt it necessary to compete with an increasingly secular culture to reverse the trends of decline that they were seeing. Gordon was especially eager to do all he could to compete with secular culture by providing spiritual leisure activities. Churches began emphasizing a Christianity that was not only spiritual but also muscular, pointing to the necessity of strong bodies as well as souls. They thus engaged in sports and other leisure activities to bring young men especially into the church. Gordon did his part by providing novels that were both exciting and enjoyable to read and that also upheld strong moral principles. His preaching, too, was influenced by the desire to reach the common man. Thus, he spoke not in a dry, didactic manner, but with a narrative style that many found greatly appealing.

Throughout his life, Gordon never swayed from his role as minister, while also writing, and serving in prominent public positions, such as moderator of the Presbyterian Church in 1922. He also served as a strong proponent for the union of the Presbyterian, Methodist and Congregational churches which ultimately resulted in the creation of the United Church of Canada in 1925.

=== Service in World War I ===
When the Great War broke out in 1914, Gordon was quick to enlist. He volunteered for service with the 43rd Cameron Highlanders as army chaplain at the age of 54. This experience greatly influenced his writing during these years, as he focused on the war cause, the soldier's lives, and the deaths he witnessed every day. His service also brought Gordon personal tragedy when his friend and mentor R.M. Thomson was killed in action.

=== Writing career ===
As a result of his dedication to his missionary tasks in Western Canada, Gordon began his literary career and wrote a fictionalized account of life in the northwest. Gordon used the 'Ralph Connor' pen name while maintaining his status as a Church leader. His early novels were set in the Western mission fields that Gordon became familiar with and the plot of his novels often followed a similar outline and his first stories were published in the Presbyterian weekly, The Westminster. The landscape and setting of his narratives was presented as a force which renewed and purified Christianity. In his novels, a missionary hero is often faced with tremendous difficulty in bringing Christianity to the wild frontier, and the men in particular posed a great challenge. This outline is evident in numerous novels such as Black Rock and The Sky Pilot. The missionary protagonist in his novels reflected the image of missionaries in the late-Victorian historical literature and were often described as being able to overcome hardship due to their dedication and unwavering faith. His protagonists also combated the harshness of the frontier by preaching the gospel and redemption. His early novels also highlighted important religious questions, such as the presence of a loving God and individual mortality, making such issues real and tangible. The drunkenness, violence and profanity present in his writing that was associated with the antagonists of his stories were portrayed as products of the western frontier and were not meant to be interpreted as alienation from God.

As suggested by Swedish historian Dick Harrison, Ralph Connor's novels are often romanticized versions of the Canadian West. His novel Corporal Cameron, for example, epitomizes the myth of the Canadian Mountie. The vision of the West rested firmly upon a British dominated society, and the North West Mounted Police represented an irresistible force stemming from an invincible culture. Cumulatively, Connor's writings on the West shift the tone of the frontier as his appeal lay not only in his clear and descriptive depictions of the Canadian West, but also in the religious and personal overtones. By writing novels, Gordon believed he was providing examples of sentimental as well as muscular Christianity and used his novels as tools to expand the Christian ministry to a wider audience. Gordon published his first novel, Black Rock, in 1898. While the book was moderately successful in Canada, his second novel, The Sky Pilot, gained him international attention in 1899 and the reputation of 'Ralph Connor' was officially launched. Gordon wrote his books in the early age of mass fiction. This period saw the regularization of copyright law and advances in printing and transportation. Several novels followed his 1899 publication such as Glengarry School Days and The Man from Glengarry; The Superintendent; The Prospector; The Doctor; and The Foreigner . The years between 1888 and 1914 were prolific for Gordon as an author and is evident in the publication and sales of his most important books. He continued to write until his death in 1937. His autobiography, Postscript to Adventure was penned in his final year and published posthumously in 1938. His books were not only popular in Canada, but also the United States, Britain, the English-speaking Commonwealth, and a great number of other countries.

While Connor's audiences responded to the straightforward appeals for conversion and the presentation of the gospel in simple style, most critics have dismissed the Christianity in his novels as being oversimplified, and therefore not worthy of significant attention. Early criticism of his romantic view of the West presented in his novels stemmed from the experiences of other Western missionaries as they had felt "blocked and frustrated by the isolation, emptiness, and seeming permanence of the wilderness in which [they] worked". The harsh experiences faced by missionaries made it difficult for many to regard the Canadian West as an area that would spark religious revival. One missionary stressed the loneliness and lack of opportunity for nurturing a deeper faith. Other critics labelled his novels to be "fictionalized sermons." Glenys Stow, summarized Connor describing him as a "Didactic popular novelist; social activist; unconscious mythmaker; Connor is a strange mixture as a writer. Little that he has written will last."

== Views on Western Canada ==
While attending Knox College, Gordon reported in the school's monthly newspaper that "men's hearts grow harder when for a few years they are without the softening influence of the gospel; and the tone of morality is such that open vice makes no discord". By the mid-19th century, Canada had reached a critical stage. Charles Gordon's impression of the religious situation in the Canadian West was strikingly similar to that of Superintendent Robertson and was inspired by him to apply his talents within Canada rather than take part in foreign mission work. Gordon later memorialized Dr. Robertson in his novel entitled The Superintendent. C.W. Gordon seemed to be particularly aware of the battle between church and secular culture and concluded that the battle to establish Christianity in the prairies would "have to be waged single-handedly by the missionary because settlers were not alarmed by irreligion and seemed uninterested in forming congregations". In addition, Gordon observed that worship services in the West were infrequent and found traditional forms of preaching and Bible study to be uninspiring.

Immigrants viewed the West in the light of the expansionist campaign and challenged all the traditional premises and viewed the North West from a new perspective: the "Promised Land" in terms of agricultural potential rather than religious expansion. The potential of the "Promised Land" was accompanied by a number of insurmountable obstacles. The difficulties on the mission fields motivated Gordon's decision to write fiction as the changes he desired to make in the developing nation would become the focal point of his fictional narratives. However, the missionaries, such as Gordon, had found little beauty or romance in the wilderness as it was accompanied with heathens and 'Indians'. C.W. Gordon believed it was his role to help the immigrants flooding the Canadian West to be "good Christians and good Canadians". He optimistically believed in the possibility of individual salvation and notions of duty and sacrifice. The praise in response to his first fictional sketches encouraged Gordon to continue writing his religious-driven stories.

== Legacy ==
Historians recognize Charles Gordon as being a "progressive" who believed in "centralized organization and unity of purpose." Gordon was honoured with a number of different degrees and awards. In 1919, he was awarded an honorary doctorate of divinity by the University of Glasgow; in 1937, the University of Manitoba awarded him an honorary L.L.D. He was appointed a Companion of the Order of St. Michael and St. George in 1935.

The United Church in Canmore, Alberta, founded as a Presbyterian Church by Dr. Gordon in 1891, was renamed Ralph Connor Memorial United Church in 1942. The structure embodies the classical mission style of ecclesiastical architecture. It is one of the earliest Presbyterian churches built in Alberta and was constructed in the Carpenter Gothic architectural style.

His grandchildren include journalist and humorist Charles Gordon and sportswriter and mystery novelist Alison Gordon.

=== Ralph Connor House ===
Ralph Connor House

General information
- Architectural style: Jacobethan Revival
- Location: 54 West Gate, Armstrong's Point, Winnipeg, Manitoba
- Current tenants: University Women’s Club of Winnipeg
- Named for: Ralph Gordon
- Completed: 1914

Design and construction
- Architect: George W. Northwood

The Ralph Connor House, located on the Assiniboine River in the Armstrong's Point neighbourhood of Winnipeg, was the home of Charles Gordon, wife Helen, and their seven children.

Today it is a heritage property designated as a National Historic Site of Canada in 2011, a Provincial Heritage Site in 2004, and a Winnipeg Landmark Heritage Structure that was built in 1913–1914. The House was named after Charles Gordon's pen name and is currently owned by the Friends of The Ralph Connor House, which has launched a 21st Century Campaign to ensure the legacy of the Gordon family continues. Their mission is to "preserve Ralph Connor House as a meeting place that keeps alive the spirit and legacies of Rev. Charles and Helen Gordon, their family and the University Women's Club of Winnipeg, and to continue service to the greater community." Their vision is to "be a centre and meeting place that fosters the work of people who are committed to education, social justice, healthy communities, human rights, music, art, literature and intellectual activity."

== Publications ==
In 1972, the National Library of Canada released The Works of Ralph Connor which listed some 43 titles as well as three books for which he wrote the introductions. His publications include:

- 1898. Beyond the Marshes, Toronto: Westminster
- 1898. Black Rock, a Tale of the Selkirks, Toronto: Westminster
- 1899. The Sky Pilot, a Tale of the Foothills
- 1901. The Man from Glengarry A Tale of the Ottawa The Westminster Company Toronto
- 1902. Glengarry School Days, Grosset
- 1904. Breaking the Record, New York: Revell
- 1904. The Prospector A Tale of the Crow's Nest Pass The Westminster Company Toronto
- 1904 Gwen: An Idyll of the Canyon Fleming Revell
- 1906. The Doctor, Revell
- 1908. The Angel and the Star, Toronto: Revell
- 1909. The Foreigner A Tale of Saskatchewan, The Westminster Company Toronto
- 1914 The Patrol of The Sun Dance Trail The Westminster Company Toronto
- 1917. The Major
- 1919. The Sky Pilot in No Man’s Land
- 1921. To Him That Hath, George H. Doran Company
- 1923. The Gaspards of Pine Croft, George H. Doran Company
- 1927 Black Rock A Tale of the Selkirks Copyright George Doran 1927, Publisher McClelland and Stewart Toronto
- 1929. The Runner A Romance of the Niagaras, Doubleday, Doran and Gundy Toronto
- 1931. The Rock and the River A Romance of Quebec, McClelland and Stewart Toronto
- 1932. The Arm of Gold, Toronto: McClelland and Stewart
- 1933. The Girl from Glengarry, New York: Dodd, Mead, & Co.
- 1934. Torches through the Bush, Dodd, Mead, & Co.
- 1935. The Rebel Loyalist, Dodd
- 1936. The Gay Crusader, Toronto: McClelland and Stewart
- 1938. Postscript to Adventure: The Autobiography of Ralph Connor, Farrar & Rinehart, inc.

== Filmography ==
- The Heart of a Lion, directed by Frank Lloyd (1917, based on the novel The Doctor)
- The Sky Pilot, directed by King Vidor (1921, based on the novel The Sky Pilot)
- God's Crucible, directed by Henry MacRae (1921, based on the novel The Foreigner)
- Cameron of the Royal Mounted, directed by Henry MacRae (1921, based on the story Corporal Cameron)
- The Man from Glengarry, directed by Henry MacRae (1922, based on the novel The Man from Glengarry)
- Glengarry School Days, directed by Henry MacRae (1923, based on the novel Glengarry School Days)
