= Back to God's Country (1919 film) =

1919 Canadian drama film

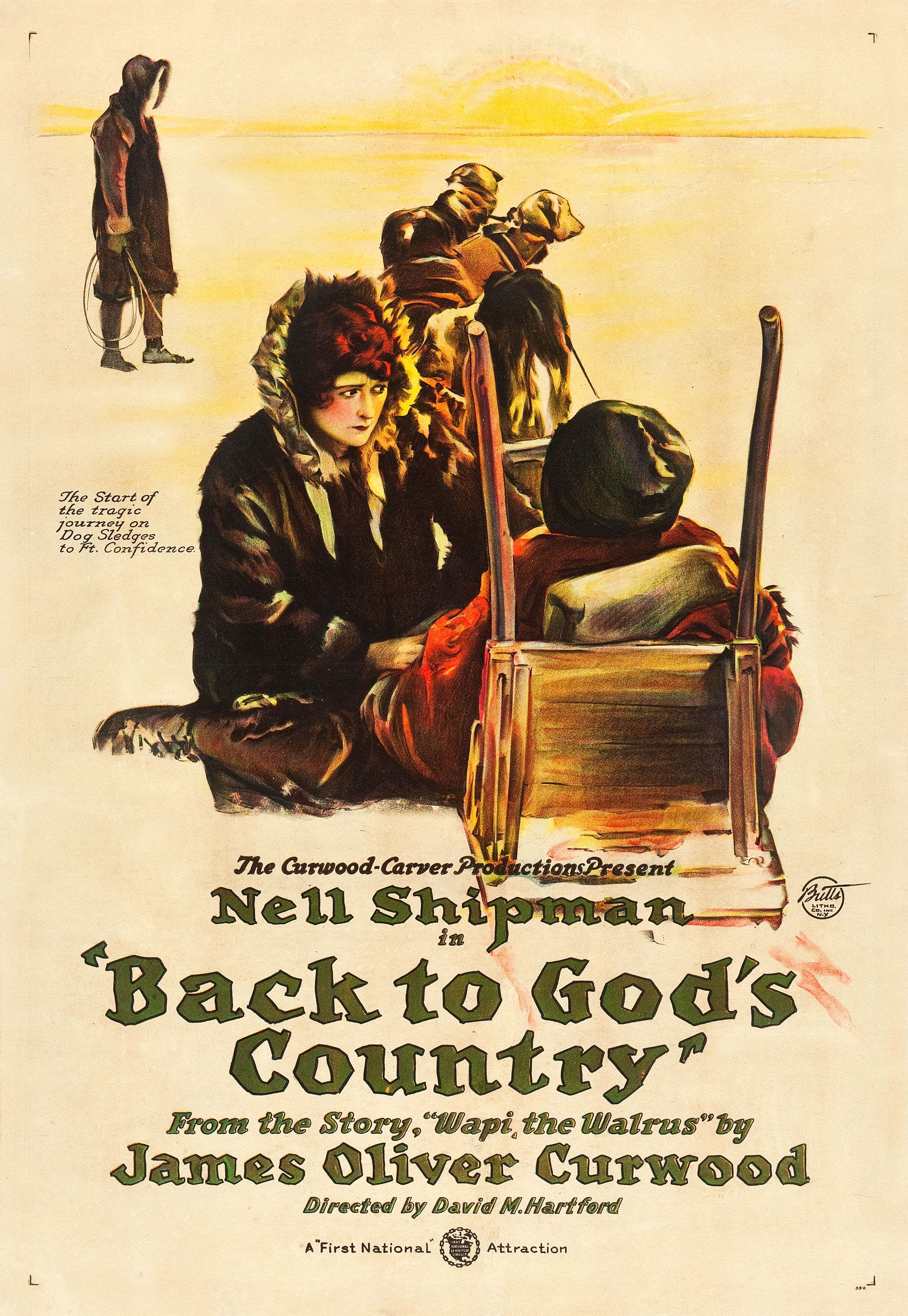
- Directed by: David Hartford
- Written by: Nell Shipman
- Produced by: James Oliver Curwood; Ernest Shipman (uncredited)
- Starring: Nell Shipman; Charles Arling; Wheeler Oakman; Wellington A. Playter
- Cinematography: Dal Clawson; Joseph Walker
- Edited by: Cyril Gardner
- Production company: Canadian Photoplays Ltd.
- Distributed by: Regal Films; First National Pictures
- Release date: October 27, 1919
- Running time: 73 minutes
- Country: Canada
- Language: Silent (English intertitles)
- Budget: $165,000

Back to God's Country

Back to God's Country is a 1919 Canadian drama film directed by David Hartford based on a story by James Curwood. It is one of the earliest Canadian feature films. The film starred Canadian actress Nell Shipman who wrote the screenplay adaptation of Curwood's story. She changed the protagonist of the film from a great dane to the female lead, Dolores. Shipman also shaped her character into a heroine, who saves her husband. Curwood was infuriated with Shipman, but commercially the film was extremely successful, posting a 300 percent profit and grossing a million-and-a-half dollars.

== Cast ==
- Nell Shipman as Dolores LeBeau
- Charles Arling as 'Sealskin' Blake
- Wheeler Oakman as Peter Burke
- Wellington A. Playter as Captain Rydal (credited as Wellington Plater)
- Ronald Byram as Peter Burke (original casting) (uncredited)
- William Colvin as Mountie Shot by Rydal (uncredited)
- Roy Laidlaw as Baptiste LeBeau, Dolores' Father (uncredited)
- Kewpie Morgan as Bully in Bar Who Shoots Chinaman (uncredited)
- Charles B. Murphy as The Half-Breed (uncredited)

== Production ==
After leaving Vitagraph Studios, Nell Shipman created a contract with James Oliver Curwood in order to adapt and star in adaptations of his work. Curwood's short story Wapi the Walrus was adapted into Back to God's Country. Nell stated that the original story "was trash as a movie; a mere outline" and her adaptation increased the role of the female character, which she played.

Ernest Shipman raised funds for the film in Calgary through the Shipman Curwood Motion Picture Production Company. When filming started the company producing it was named Shipman Curwood Productions, but was renamed Curwood-Carver Productions, which was the name used in the credits.

David Hartford and Bert Van Tuyle directed the film, but only Hartford was credited. Filming occurred from 12-13 March to 31 May 1919, at a cost of $165,000 (equivalent to $2,764,592 in 2025). Shooting started at Lesser Slave Lake on 12 or 13 March 1919, and lasted two weeks before moving to Calgary and completed filming by 31 May at Kern River and San Francisco.

One scene showing Dolores mushing through "the frozen waste" was filmed at -60 degrees °F. Ronald Byram died of pneumonia during filming at Lesser Slave Lake and was replaced by Wheeler Oakman. Van Tuyle's right foot suffered from frostbite and some of his toes were amputated due to gangrene.

Cinematographer Joseph Walker used a technique he learned from Billy Bitzer, in which he opened the lens as wide as possible in order for the background to appear soft and unobtrusive compared to the dominance of the person in the foreground.

Nell initially did a bathing scene wearing a flesh-coloured wool costume, but removed it after the first take and performed the scene nude. In her autobiography she claimed that she was the first woman to perform nude in a film.

The film was remade by Joseph Pevney in 1953.

== Release ==
Back to God's Country was released by First National Pictures in the United States on 29 September 1919, and by Regal Films in Canada on 27 October. Nell's nude scene was heavily used in the advertising. Wapi the Walrus was republished under the film's title and using production stills.

== Preservation ==
A print of the film was placed into the archives of the National Film, Television and Sound Archives in 1972. The National Film, Television and Sound Archives conducted a restoration of the film after it acquired a second print of the film featuring scenes not in their print. Back to God's Country was screened at the 1984 Festival of Festivals as part of Front & Centre, a special retrospective program of artistically and culturally significant films from throughout the history of Canadian cinema.

== See also ==
- List of rediscovered films

== Works cited ==
- Armatage, Kay (2003). The Girl from God's Country: Nell Shipman and the Silent Cinema. University of Toronto Press. ISBN 9781442681378.
- Turner, D. John, ed. (1987). Canadian Feature Film Index: 1913-1985. Canadian Film Institute. ISBN 0660533642.
