= Harlan Knight =

American actor

- Born: August 6, 1875; Limerick, Maine, U.S.
- Died: April 8, 1940 (aged 66); Manhattan, New York, U.S.
- Occupation: Actor
- Years active: 1921–1935 (film)

Harlan Knight (1875–1940) was an American stage and film actor. During the early 1920s he featured in several Canadian silent films including Blue Water alongside the future star Norma Shearer.

== Filmography ==
- The Iron Trail (1921)
- Jane Eyre (1921)
- The Country Flapper (1922)
- The Man from Glengarry (1922)
- The Rapids (1922)
- Glengarry School Days (1923)
- The Little Red Schoolhouse (1923)
- The Steadfast Heart (1923)
- Blue Water (1924)
- The New School Teacher (1924)
- Janice Meredith (1924)
- The Warrens of Virginia (1924)
- His Buddy's Wife (1925)
- Lena Rivers (1925)
- The Knockout (1925)
- Rainbow Riley (1926)
- Things Wives Tell (1926)
- White Mice (1926)
- The Wives of the Prophet (1926)
- Dance Magic (1927)
- Tol'able David (1930)
- Heaven on Earth (1931)
- The Fighting Sheriff (1931)
- Whistlin' Dan (1932)
- The Story of Temple Drake (1933)
- To the Last Man (1933)
- Laughing Boy (1934)
- The County Chairman (1935)
- The Roaring West (1935)

== Bibliography ==
- Morris, Peter. Embattled Shadows: A History of Canadian Cinema, 1895-1939. McGill-Queen's Press, 1992.
