= The Knockout (1925 film) =

1925 film

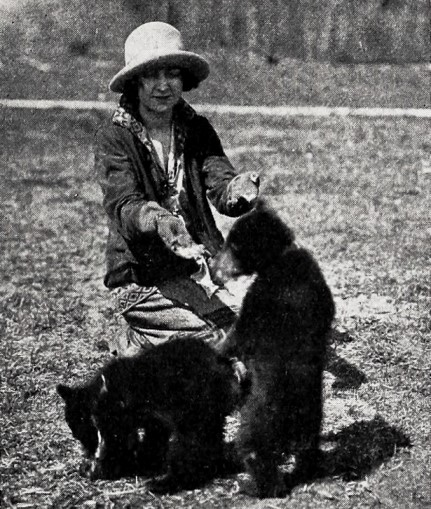
- Lorna Duveen with bear cubs
- Directed by: Lambert Hillyer
- Written by: Joseph F. Poland; Earle Snell; Marion Fairfax
- Based on: The Come-Back; 1925 novel by Morris DeCamp Crawford
- Produced by: Earl Hudson
- Starring: Milton Sills
- Cinematography: Roy Carpenter
- Edited by: Arthur Tavares
- Production company: First National Pictures
- Distributed by: First National Pictures
- Release date: August 23, 1925
- Running time: 8 reels
- Country: United States
- Language: Silent (English intertitles)

The Knockout is a 1925 American silent drama film directed by Lambert Hillyer and starring Milton Sills. It was based on the novel The Come-Back by Morris DeCamp Crawford. It was produced by and released by First National Pictures.

== Plot ==
As described in a film magazine reviews, Sandy Donlin, world’s light heavyweight boxing champion, hurts his right arm and is told by his doctor that, if he uses the arm in the fight, he will never use it again. Because he thinks the arm useless, he accepts the offer of the lumberman Parker to become his manager in a Canadian lumber camp. Donlin accepts because he has just met and fallen in love with Jean Farot, daughter of Parker’s rival. Parker wants Donlin at the camp because he can whip Jack Ducane, the foreman for Farot, who has blocked the efforts of Parker’s men to jam Farot’s logs. Ducane accuses Donlin of getting the Farot loggers drunk to cause them to jam the logs. Donlin learns in the ensuing fight that the right arm has healed. Parker’s men blow up Farot’s dam and jam the river with logs. Donlin offers to break the jam and unsuccessfully tries dynamite. Jean loses faith in Donlin’s love because she thinks he is in the plot against her father, who is in Parker’s debt. Donlin goes to New York, wins another championship fight, pays Farot’s debt, and permanently establishes himself in Jean’s favor.

== Cast ==
- Milton Sills as Sandy Donlin
- Lorna Duveen as Jean Farot
- JohnPhilip Kolb as Black Jack Ducane
- Edward Lawrence as Mike Leary
- Harry Cording as Steve McKenna
- Frankie Evans as Brown
- Harlan Knight as Farot
- Jed Prouty as Mac
- Claude King as Parker

== Preservation ==
With no prints of The Knockout located in any film archives, it is now a lost film. Just the trailer survives in the Library of Congress collection.
