= The Little Red Schoolhouse (1923 film) =

1923 film

- Directed by: John G. Adolfi
- Written by: James Shelley Hamilton
- Starring: Martha Mansfield; Harlan Knight; Sheldon Lewis
- Cinematography: George Webber
- Production company: Martin J. Heyl
- Distributed by: Arrow Film Corporation
- Release date: May 10, 1923
- Running time: 60 minutes
- Country: United States
- Languages: Silent; English intertitles

The Little Red Schoolhouse is a 1923 American silent drama film directed by John G. Adolfi and starring Martha Mansfield, Harlan Knight and Sheldon Lewis.

== Cast ==
- Martha Mansfield as Mercy Brent
- Harlan Knight as Jeb Russell
- Sheldon Lewis as Mr. Matt Russell
- E.K. Lincoln as John Hale
- Edmund Breese as Brent
- Florida Kingsley as Hired Girl
- Paul Everton as Detective

== Bibliography ==
- Munden, Kenneth White. The American Film Institute Catalog of Motion Pictures Produced in the United States, Part 1. University of California Press, 1997.
