= The Sky Pilot =

1921 film directed by King Vidor

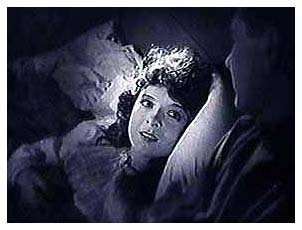
- Colleen Moore in a scene from The Sky Pilot.
- Directed by: King Vidor
- Written by: Ralph Connor; Faith Green; John McDermott
- Produced by: Cathrine Curtis
- Starring: John Bowers
- Cinematography: L. William O'Connell; Gus Peterson
- Distributed by: First National Pictures
- Release date: April 17, 1921
- Running time: 77 minutes
- Country: United States
- Language: Silent (English intertitles)

The Sky Pilot (1921)

The Sky Pilot is a 1921 American silent drama film based on the novel of the same name by Ralph Connor. It was directed by King Vidor and features Colleen Moore. In February 2020, the film was shown in a newly restored version at the 70th Berlin International Film Festival, as part of a retrospective dedicated to King Vidor's career.

== Plot ==
The Sky Pilot arrives in a small rough-and-tumble cattle town in Canada, intent on bringing religion to its tough residents. At first they reject him, but in time he wins the residents over with his prowess. A plot to steal cattle is uncovered and disrupted. Gwen, daughter of the "Old Timer," is injured in a stampede, loses her ability to walk, but recovers thanks to the power of love.

== Cast ==
- John Bowers as The Sky Pilot
- Colleen Moore as Gwen
- David Butler as Bill Hendricks
- Harry Todd as The Old Timer
- James Corrigan as Honorable Ashley
- Donald MacDonald as The Duke
- Kathleen Kirkham as Lady Charlotte

== Production ==
The Sky Pilot was filmed in part at Vidor's new studio, Vidor Village and marked a break from the “stage-bound” feature The Family Honor (1920), a comedy-romance he had just completed for First National exhibitors. Shot largely in the High Sierra near Truckee, California, this big budget western was plagued by bad weather. Costly efforts to create landscapes on location produced budget overruns diminishing the profitability of the film. First National released the picture but declined to finance any further film projects by Vidor.

These financial setbacks signaled the demise of King Vidor Productions. Courts ordered the dismantling of Vidor Village, and though Vidor would briefly regain control of the studio operations there were not revived. He sold the property in January 1923.

Vidor and his leading lady, Colleen Moore, fell in love during the filming of The Sky Pilot. Vidor and Moore would pursue their love affair until 1924. Married at the time to his childhood sweetheart and film actress Florence Vidor, Vidor and his spouse divorced in 1926.

== Theme ==
The film serves to showcase Vidor's faith in the power of positive thinking, free of puritanism or Christian moralizing, which celebrates the virtues of self-reliance and the inherent vitality of rural communities.

The precise theme of the film remains ambiguous. According to sources, Vidor attempts to entertain the audience with a light farce and sanctimoniously impress them with spectacular natural scenery, the latter "which is closest to Vidor’s heart." The redemptive value of "individualist" faith provides a subtext for the movie, as John Bowers as the manly Sky Pilot adroitly converts local ruffians to Christian-like virtues. When cowboy Bill Hendricks (David Butler is bested by the Sky Pilot in a fist fight he confesses: "When a man’s religion will let him do what you done and live, there must something in it."

== Home media ==
The Sky Pilot was released on Region 0 DVD-R by Alpha Video on January 28, 2014.
