= Emma Gendron =

French-Canadian writer

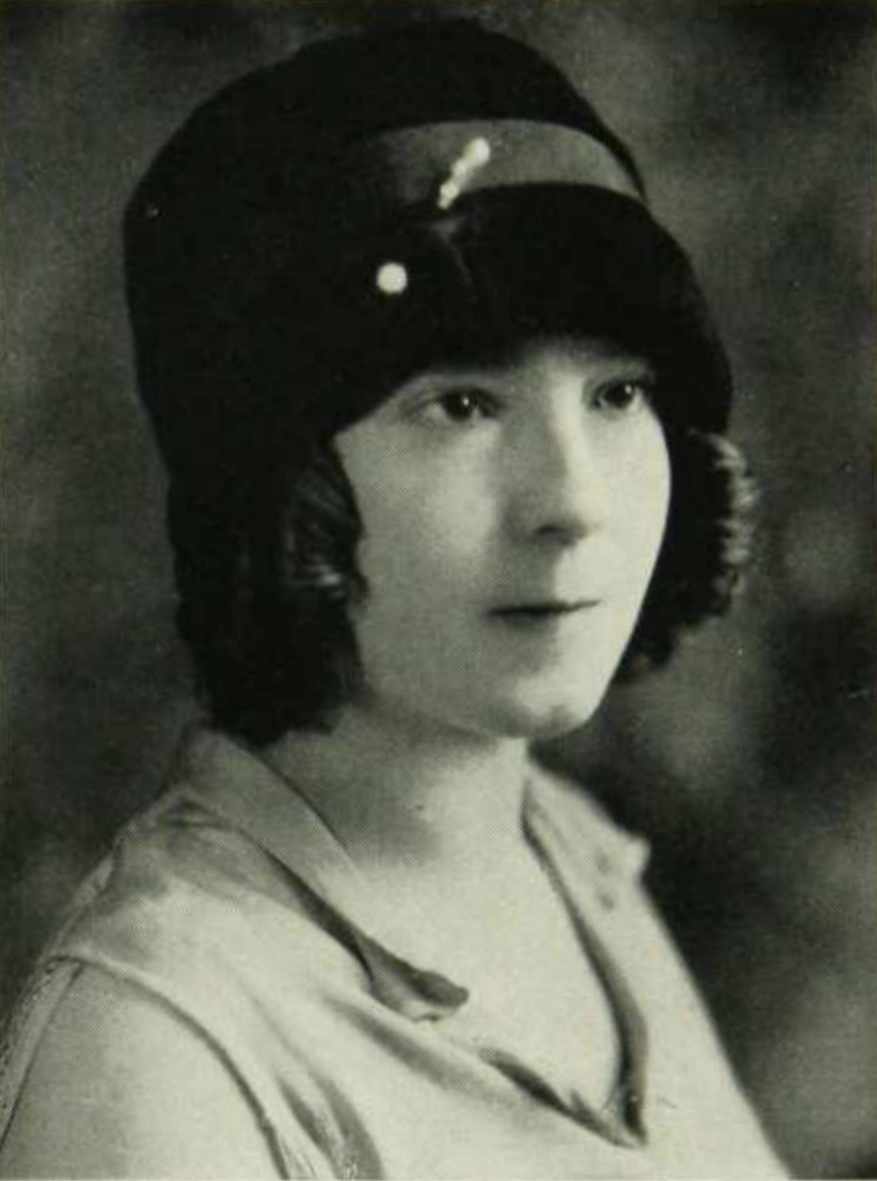
- Born: 1895; Saint-Barnabé, Quebec, Canada
- Died: 1952 (aged 56–57); Montréal, Quebec, Canada
- Occupations: journalist, playwright, screenwriter, writer
- Spouse: Allan Robert Green

Emma Gendron was a French-Canadian screenwriter, playwright, and journalist, born in 1895 in Saint-Barnabé, Quebec, Canada. She has been noted as one of the primary figures in Quebecois silent cinema and was likely one of the first female screenwriters in Quebec.

In the early years of Francophone cinema in Canada, films were primarily focused on non-fiction topics; filmmakers produced newsreels, actualities, and travelogues. However, of the few fiction films produced, Emma Gendron was a notable female screenwriter alongside Marguerite Marquis. Gendron also became well known for her column, Courrier de Manon, and also ran as a candidate in federal elections. Emma Gendron has been considered a key pioneer in French-Canadian cinema by numerous scholars.

== Personal life ==
Gendron was born in the small Canadian village of Saint-Barnabé, Quebec, Canada in 1895. She was educated through a convent prior to starting work as a secretary at 13-years-old. In her early 20s, she moved to Montréal, Quebec, to study and later became a regular contributor to a number of local newspapers.

During her career as a screenwriter in the 1920s and 1930s, she was rumoured to have been in a romantic relationship with film director Joseph-Arthur Homier who was married with children. Homier died in 1934, and Gendron married Allan Robert Green in 1939.

Emma Gendron died in Montréal, Quebec, in 1952 of an asthma attack.

== Career ==
=== Journalism ===
After moving to Montréal in her 20s, Gendron became a regular contributor to Le Samedi and La Revue populaire, among other Quebec newspapers. In 1922, Gendron wrote her award-winning play Namounah, a drama about forbidden love between an Indigenous princess and a white man. The play gained significant attention from the Montréal press, and was awarded a drama prize from McGill University in 1922.

=== Screenwriting ===
Shortly after writing Namounah, Gendron met Joseph-Arthur Homier, who was making newsreel films about Montréal at the time.

Gendron's first screenwriting credit was for Homier's feature-length film, Madeleine de Verchères (1922), an adaption based on the tale of Quebecois heroine Madeleine de Verchères. The film was successful in Canadian box offices, which led Gendron and Homier to release another film, La drogue fatale (1924). La drogue fatale (1924) failed to reach Anglophone-Canadian audiences and was not nearly as successful as Madeleine de Verchères (1922).

Shortly after the release of La drogue fatale (1924), Homier and Gendron began working on their third film, Les fils de la liberté, which was to be a tale of the Quebecois rebellion against the British in the late 1830s. The film was never taken to the production stage.

After the release of La drogue fatale and end of her work on Les fils de la liberté, Gendron returned to journalism in Montréal. She became well known for her advice column, Courrier de Manon, in which she wrote as her persona, Manon. The column was later gathered in La Revue de Manon, a women's magazine and film digest. In La Revue de Manon, Gendron wrote serial romances and gossip columns among other pieces. She also began writing serial novels and children's comics that have been argued by some to be infamous for reproducing Rosicrucian ideas.

=== Politics ===
Before settling down with Allan Robert Green in 1939, Gendron ran as an independent candidate in the riding of Saint-Jacques in downtown Montréal during the federal election of 1935. She was the only female candidate from Quebec in the election, and even though she was not elected, Gendron still collected around 3,000 ballots. Similar to the ideologies in her novels and children's comics, Gendron raised ideas from Rosicrucianism.

== Films ==
=== Madeleine de Verchères (1922) ===
Gendron's first credited film, Madeleine de Verchères, was directed by Joseph-Arthur Homier and retold the story of a Quebec colony that was defended in 1692. Madeleine de Verchères was a 14-year-old historical heroine who was said to have saved the new colony from the Iroquois with the help of only a few settlers.

The film was produced by the British American Film Manufacturing Company (BRIAM) and began production in 1912 near Montréal. During this time, many lost or forgotten Quebecois heroes were being brought back into the media. The film was shot on the Kahnawake Mohawk Territory south of Montréal and residents were employed as extras.

After its release in 1922, reviewers and critics hailed the film for its historical realism. Though the film has been lost, archived newspaper articles described it as realistic and historically accurate. At the time of release, the film failed to be marketed to the National Historic Sites of Canada because federal historians found many inaccuracies.

Madeleine de Verchères has been noted as the first feature film produced in Canada, and perhaps in all of North America. However, this is up for debate among academia and historians, since Evangeline (1913) was released first, but began production after Madeleine de Verchères.

=== La drogue fatale (1924) ===
Gendron and Homier's second film together, La drogue fatale, was an urban crime drama, likely inspired by American gangster movies of the time. The film tells the story of twin orphans separated at birth, one of which is adopted by a police chief. The main plot focuses on a war between the Montréal police and drug mafia. In order to stop investigations, the mafia leader kidnaps the police chief's daughter and causes her to become dependent on drugs. She is later freed by another member of the mafia, whom she ends up marrying.

The film has Anglophone-sounding characters and included bilingual subtitles, but failed to reach English-speaking audiences. The film marks the end of Gendron and Homier's filmmaking careers.

=== Les fils de la liberté (unfinished) ===
After La drogue fatale (1924), Homier and Gendron began work on another film, Les fils de la liberté. The film was to recall the Lower Canada Rebellion against the British Empire in 1837–1838, but was never pushed to production, likely because of the lack of success of La drogue fatale.

== Filmography ==
- Madeleine de Verchères (1922)
- La drogue fatale (1924)
- Les fils de la liberté (unfinished)
