= Nell Shipman =

Canadian actress (1892–1970)

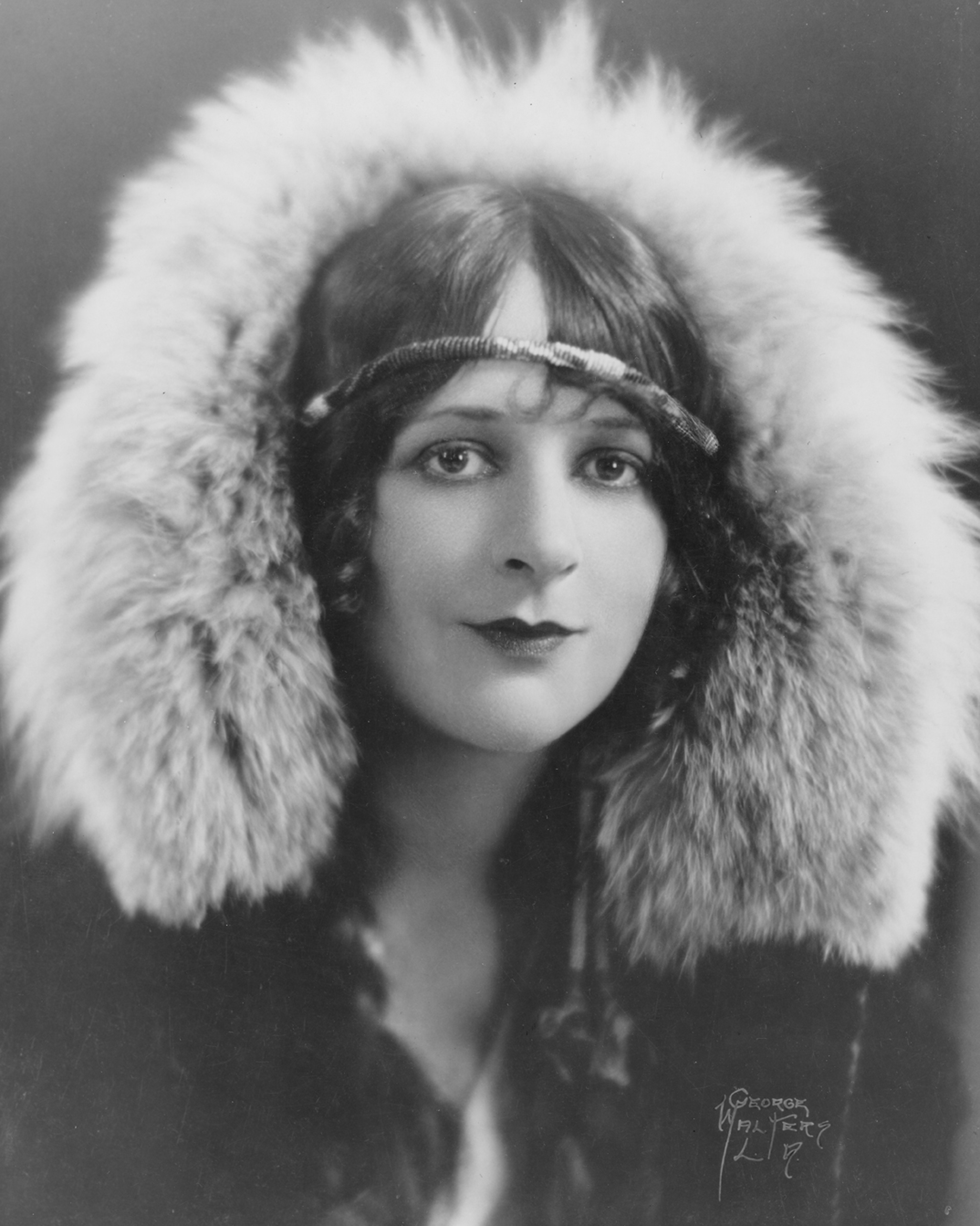
- Shipman in 1918
- Born: Helen Foster-Barham; October 25, 1892; Victoria, British Columbia, Canada
- Died: January 23, 1970 (aged 77); Cabazon, California, U.S.
- Occupations: Actress, screenwriter, director, producer, animal trainer
- Years active: 1910–1947
- Spouses: Ernest Shipman (m. 1910–1920) Charles H. Austin Ayers (m. 1925–1932)
- Partner: Bert Van Tuyle (c.1918 – 1924)
- Children: 3, including Barry Shipman

Nell Shipman (born Helen Foster-Barham; October 25, 1892 – January 23, 1970) was a Canadian actress, writer, and director who was active in silent film in the 1910s and 1920s. She used "the girl from God's country" as her sobriquet after starring in God's Country and the Woman.

Born in Victoria, British Columbia, in 1892, her family moved to Seattle, Washington, in 1904. She became interested in performing arts while on a family vacation in the United Kingdom and joined a vaudeville group in 1905. While working in a play she met and married film producer Ernest Shipman and the couple moved to California.

Shipman wrote and directed a few films before receiving a contract with Vitagraph Studios. After doing ten films with Vitagraph she formed her own company and adapted James Oliver Curwood's Wapi the Walrus into Back to God's Country. During the production of the film she had an affair with Bert Van Tuyle and divorced Ernst. Van Tuyle and Shipman formed another company and produced a few films, including The Grub-Stake, before going bankrupt. She attempted to revive her filmmaking career and moved across the United States until her death.

== Early life ==
Helen Foster Barham was born in Victoria, British Columbia, on 25 October 1892, to Arnold and Rose Barham. Her parents were born in the United Kingdom and moved to Canada a few years before her birth. In 1904, her family moved to Seattle, Washington.

During a family trip to the United Kingdom Foster-Barham decided to become a performer after seeing a theatre and started taking acting lessons before joining a vaudeville group in 1905. She performed in Jesse Lasky's play The Pianophiends in 1907, and was the lead in Charles Taylor's play The Girl From Alaska in 1909. From 1908 to 1910, she worked with the National Stock Company, Taylor Stock Company, and Sutton Players. These companies took across the Pacific Northwest and Alaska.

From an early age, she developed a respect towards animals. She was passionate about animal rights and advocated them in Hollywood. She developed her private sanctuary, containing more than 200 animals.

== Early career ==
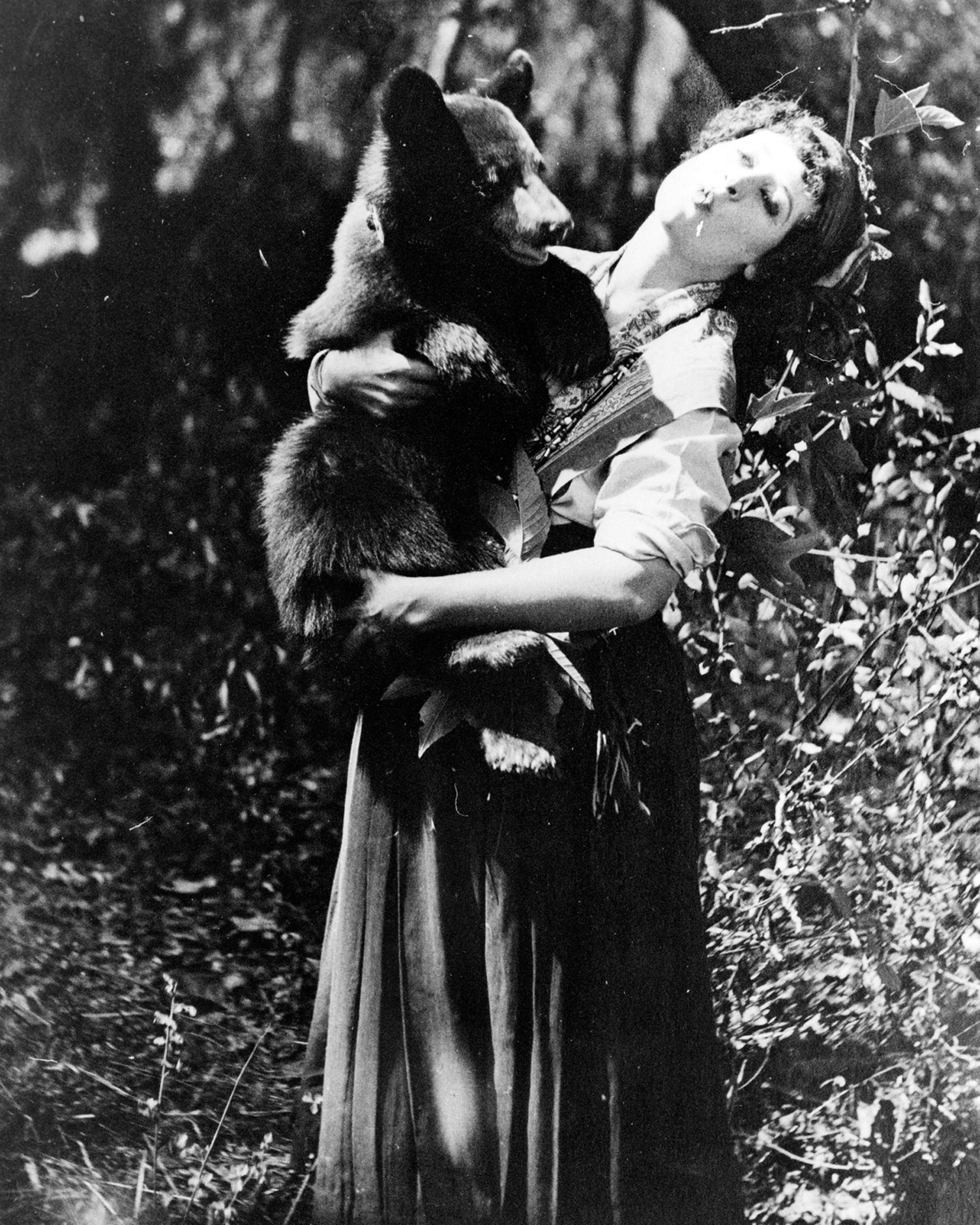
Photograph of Nell Shipman and a bear in 1916

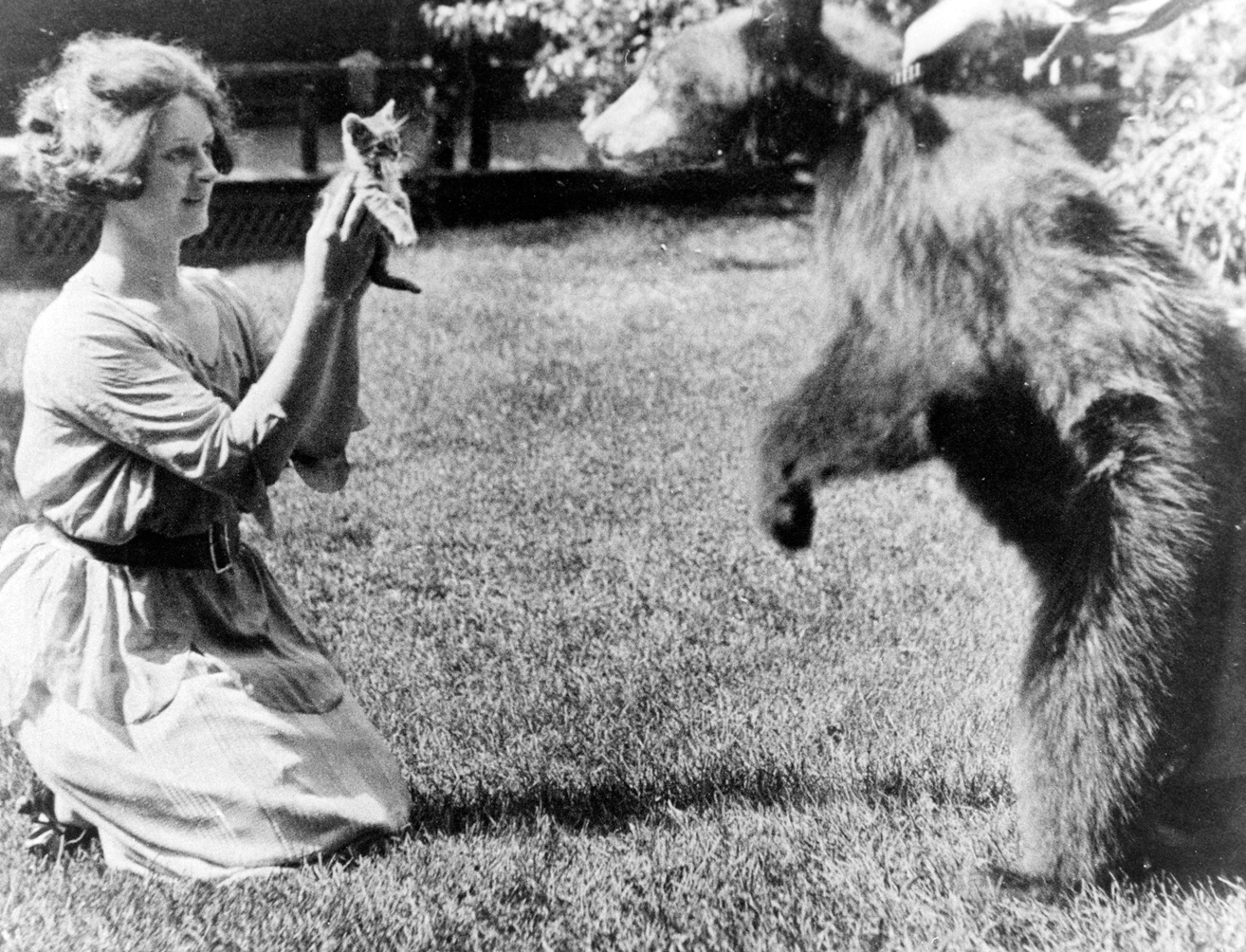
Nell Shipman and Brownie the Bear in 1920

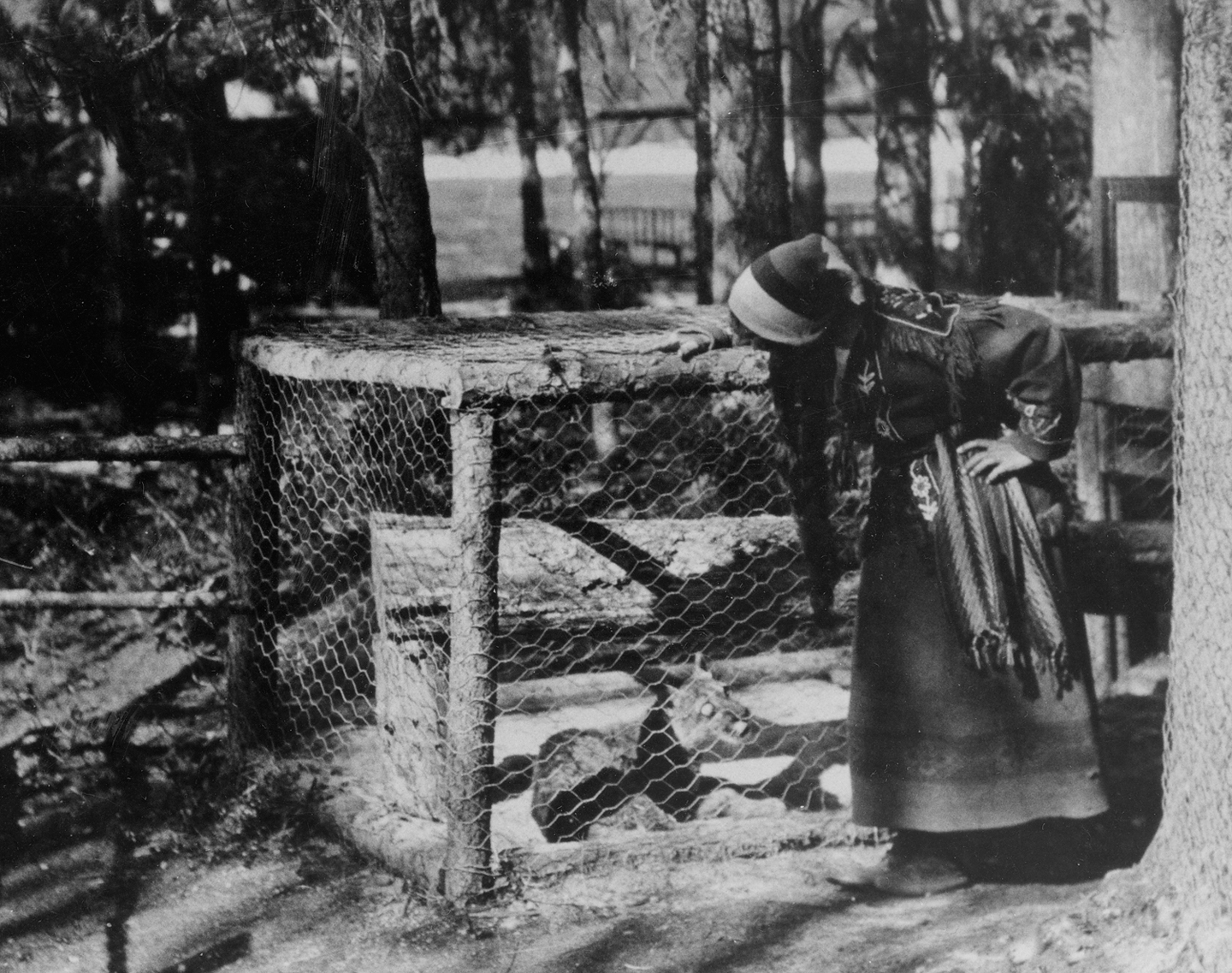
Nell Shipman looking into a cougar cage

At age 18, Foster-Barham was cast in a production of Rex Beach's The Barrier, which was being managed by Ernest Shipman. On 25 August 1910, she married Shipman, with whom she had Barry Shipman; she was his fourth wife. The couple moved to California in 1910, where she then worked as a screenwriter. She wrote and star in The Ball of Yarn in 1912, but was critical of its quality stating that it was so bad "that even Ernie couldn't book it". The first film she directed was Outwitted by Billy.

From 1912 to 1917, Shipman sold scripts to Selig Polyscope Company, Australasian Films, the American Film Company, the Palo Alto Film Corporation, and Universal Pictures. Shipman advertised her writing ability in trade magazines as she understood "the technicalities and limitations of the camera". She turned her film Under the Crescent into a 277-page novel with 58 stills from the film.

Rollin S. Sturgeon, the director of God's Country and the Woman, brought Shipman onto the project to help with the script with no pay. This was the first Vitagraph Studios film that she acted in and she used "the girl from God's country" as a publicity sobriquet. Vitagraph gave her an acting contract and loaned her out to Famous Players–Lasky for The Black Wolf (1917). During her time at Vitagraph from 1915 to 1918, she played major roles in at least ten feature films. Gayne Whitman starred alongside Shipman in four films directed by William Wolbert. At the end of Shipman's contract with Vitagraph she was earning $300 per week. Goldwyn Pictures offered her a seven-year contract, but she declined the offer as she was critical of the costumes they had for their contract actors.

Shipman almost drowned during the production of A Gentlemen's Agreement (1918) for a scene depicting an overturned canoe. In 1918, Shipman and her mother Rose Barahm both fell ill with influenza. Shipman managed to fully recover while her mother died.

== Back to God's Country to The Grub Stake ==
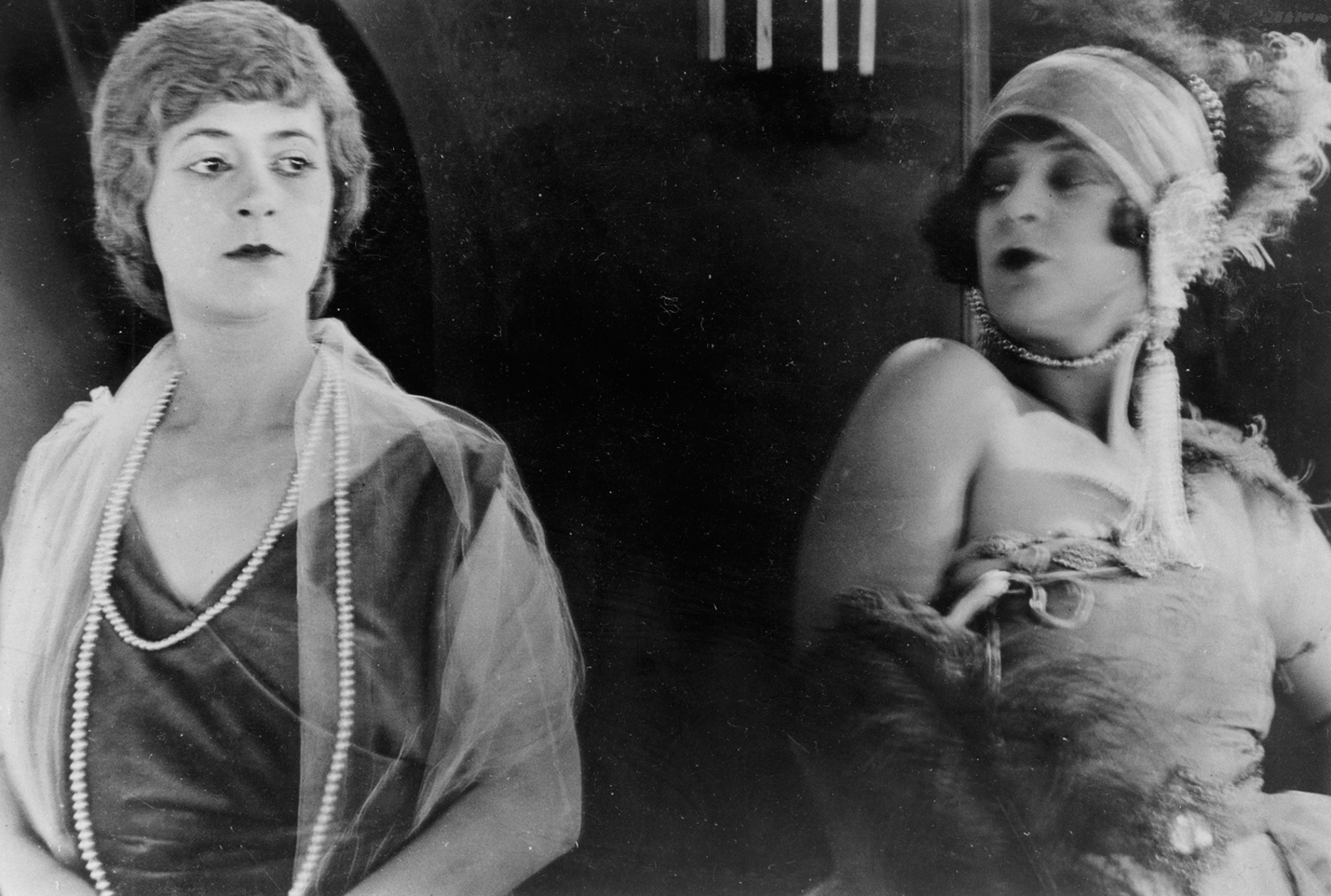
Nell Shipman played a dual role in The Girl from God's Country.

Leaving Vitagraph on 1 November 1918, Shipman formed the Shipman-Curwood Producing Company with Ernest as the business-manager and sales agent. She created a contract with James Oliver Curwood in order to adapt and star in adaptations of his work. Other actresses, such as Gene Gauntier, Clara Kimball Young, Florence Turner, and Anita Stewart, had formed their own production companies after working for other studios.

Curwood's short story Wapi the Walrus was adapted into Back to God's Country. Shipman stated that the original story "was trash as a movie; a mere outline" and her adaptation increased the role of the female protagonist, which was played by Shipman. Back To God's Country was a major Canadian and international silent film hit. Despite the film's success, Curwood did not like the fact that Shipman changed the plot of his short story and the protagonist from Wapi the Great Dane to Delores. Back to God's Country was the only film ever made under the Shipman-Curwood contract.

Shipman played a benevolent, animal loving Delores LeBeau as the star in Back to God's Country. Shipman worked with a bear cub, multiple dogs, and a porcupine on the set of the film, some of which she helped train, as Shipman was an avid animal lover. She helped co-produced and co-write the film. Shipman also wrote in and filmed a nude scene, the end product of which was cut from the Final Cut of the film. The film's filming schedule is a topic on which sources differ, whether it began as early as the winter of 1918 whereas or whether it began in March 1919 is unconfirmed. Regardless, the filming took Shipman all over North America. Many of the scenes in the wilderness were filmed in Alberta, near Lesser Slave Lake, other filming locations consist of the San Francisco Bay area, the Kern River domain, and what was not filmed in those locations was filmed using the Robert Brunton Studios in Hollywood. The Filming was finished in May 1919 and the film was then debuted later in the year in September. The Film was an unprecedented success at the time, becoming Canada's most popular feature film, while being screened on an international scale. The film while only costing around 67,000 dollars, grossed over 1.5 million dollars. Nell Shipman's role in the making of this film was vital.

Shipman had an extramarital affair with Bert Van Tuyle during the production of Back to God's Country. On 10 May 1920, she divorced Ernest and moved to Highland Park, Los Angeles, with her son and Van Tuyle, who constructed a building next door. Shipman did two films for automobile companies, Trail of the Arrow and Something New, while awaiting her earnings from Back to God's Country. The animals used for Back to God's Country were purchased by Shipman as part of the severance agreement for her partnership with Ernest and Curwood.

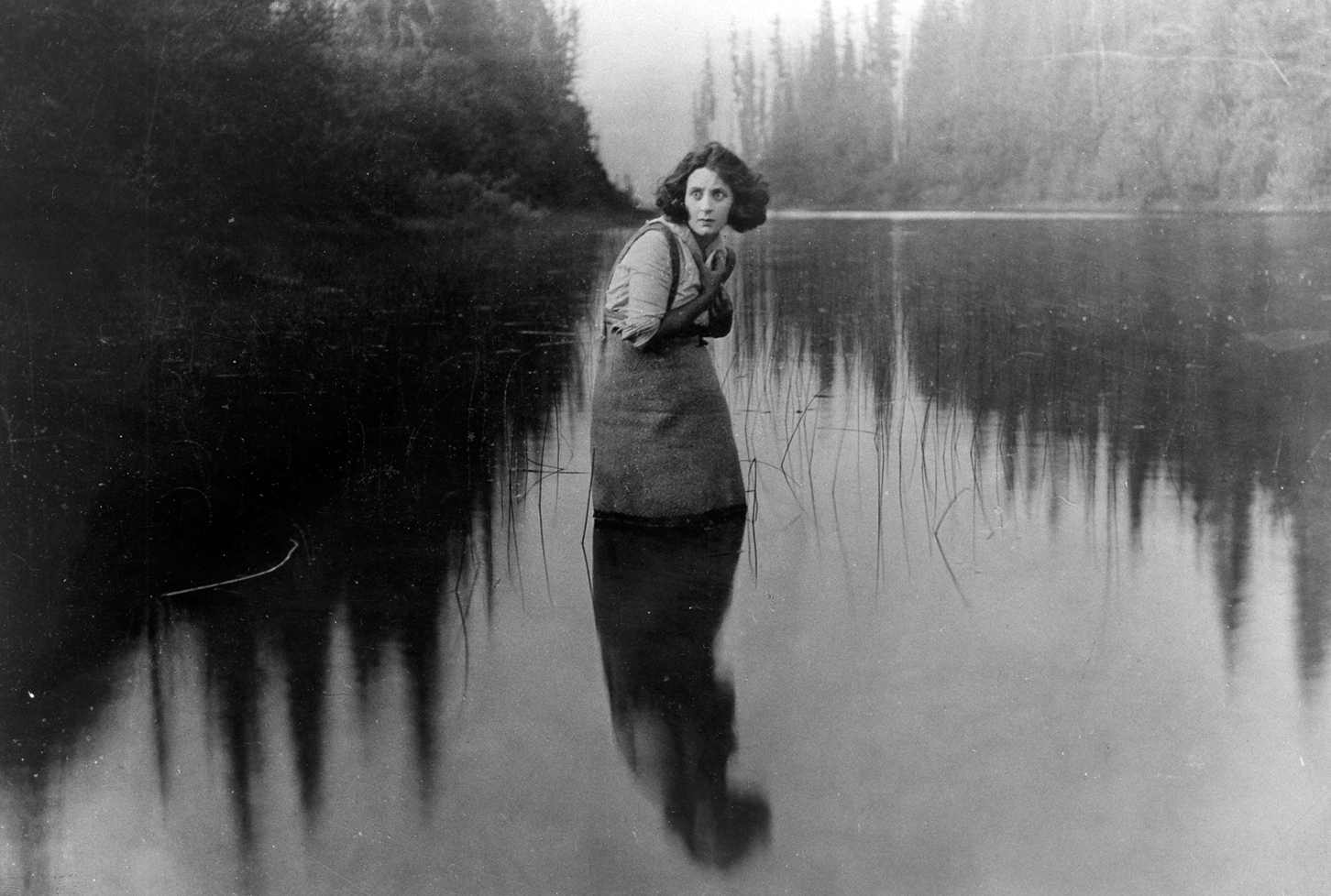
Nell Shipman in The Grub-Stake

Nell Shipman Productions was formed in October 1920. Shipman and Van Tuyle raised $250,000 for The Girl from God's Country in Spokane, Washington, through the company Nell Shipman Productions. The film was unsuccessful and Shipman moved her company to Priest Lake, Idaho, where she produced The Grub-Stake. She transported her zoo of animals on barges up to Priest Lake for her films at Lion Head Lodge. The Grub-Stake cost around $180,000 to produce. The film, in which Shipman starred as a character named Faith Diggs, tells the story of a woman who is lured into a life of prostitution with lies of a better life, which her character eventually escapes from. Subsequently, Diggs ends up in the den of a bear, where she finds there the "love and sympathy denied her by human hearts." As a result of many things including the rise of a studio dominated motion picture industry, the film struggled. The distributor went bankrupt before it received money earned from films released after February 1923, including The Grub-Stake.

The relationship between Shipman and Van Tuyle ended in 1924. Van Tuyle threatened to kill Shipman around Christmas 1924, and Shipman tried to kill herself by drowning, but was stopped by her son Barry. In 1925, Shipman's company went bankrupt after it produced ten films.

== Later life ==
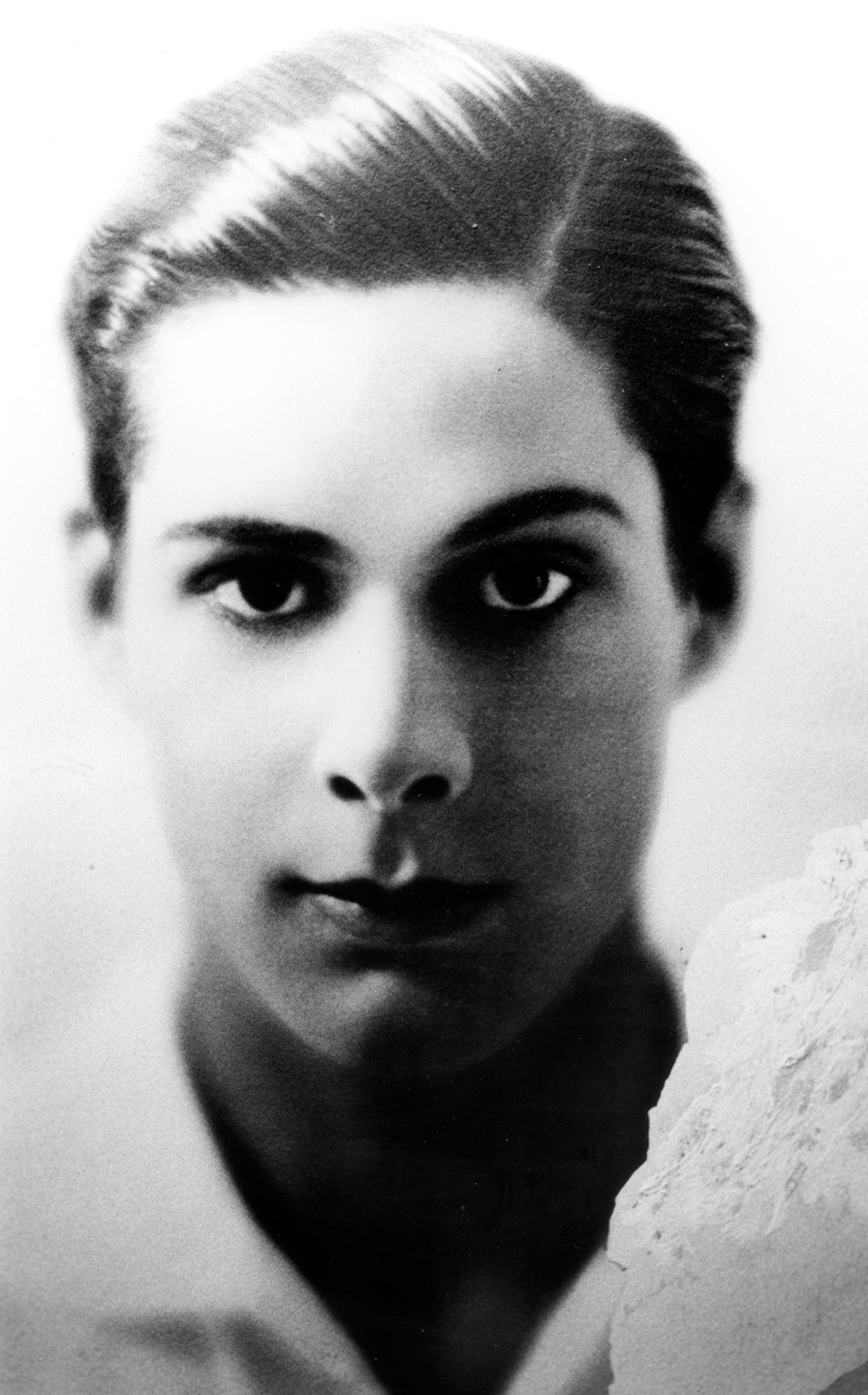
Photograph of Barry Simpson

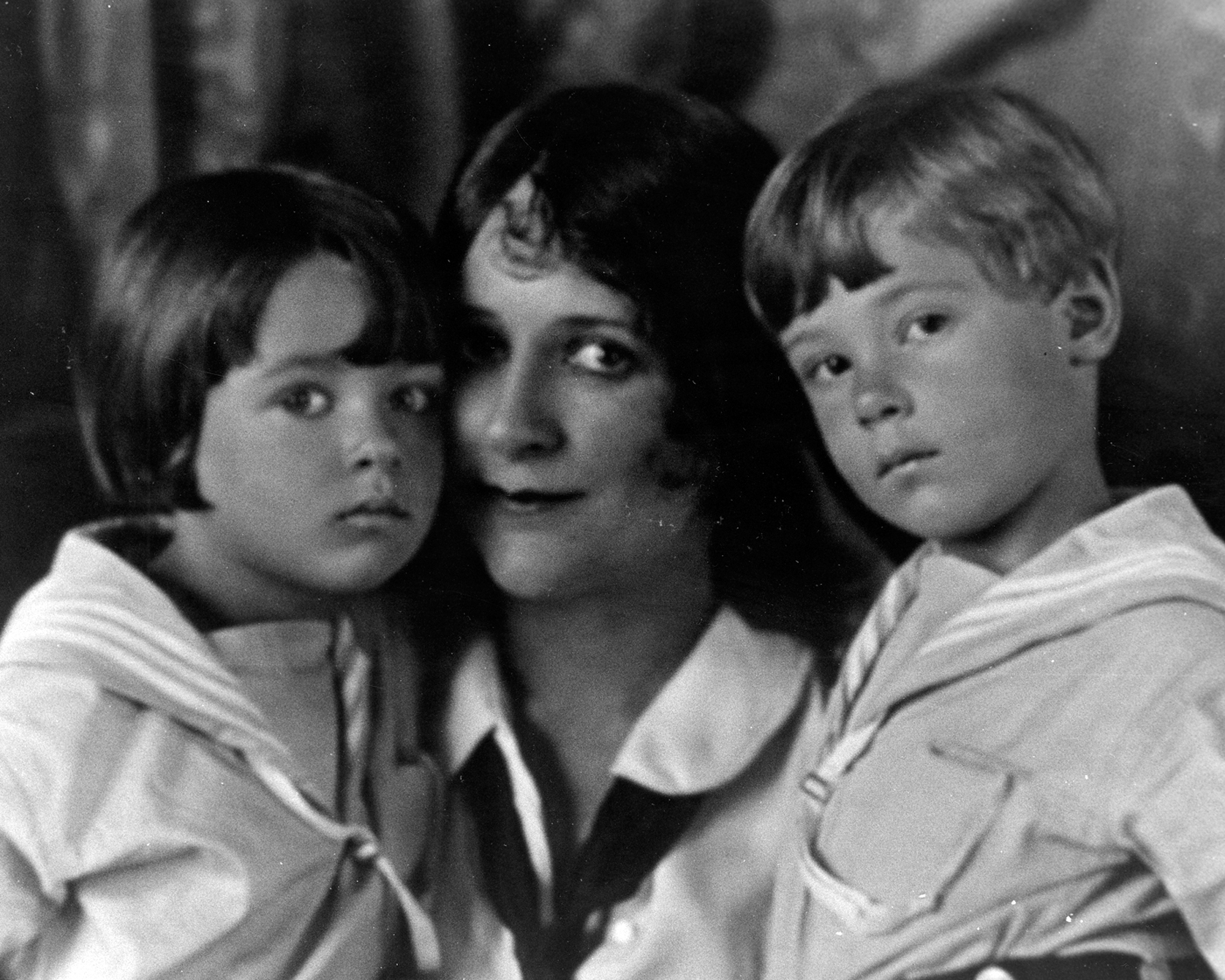
Nell Shipman and her twin children

After Shipman's company went bankrupt she moved to Seattle and then New York. She met Charles Ayers and married him in 1925, with whom she had twins on 3 May 1926. Ayers and Shipman separated in 1934. During Shipman's marriage with Ayers she lived in Taos, Glendale, Sausalito, Los Angeles, Requa, Klamath, Venice, and Big Bear.

In March 1928, Shipman played Sara de Sota for an annual pageant hosted by the Ringling Bros. and Barnum & Bailey Circus in Sarasota, Florida. Are Screen Stars Dumb?, a one-act play, was written by Shipman and she performed in it alongside Barry in Miami in May 1928; it was the last time that she acted. Dial Press published three books by Shipman: Kurly Kew and the Tree Princess, Get the Woman, and Abandoned Trails. Good Housekeeping published her work This Little Bear Went to Hollywood, which reminisced about her filmmaking career. One of her stories was adapted into Wings in the Dark (1934).

In 1935, Shipman started a relationship with Arthur Varney, previously known as Amerigo Serrao, was a former film director, that lasted until the 1950s. Varney and Shipman moved six times in 1939 alone. They lived in New York, Florida, and California, attempting to finance productions in the 1940s, but eventually became homeless. They received financial backing for The Story of Mr. Hobbs and completed it in 1947, but it was never released although an incomplete version was shown by the British Film Institute in 1996. Inspired by Joseph McCarthy, the couple attempted to make an anti-communist film, but never received financial backing.

Varney died in 1960, and Shipman lived with friends and relatives in New England, New Jersey, and New York between 1960 and 1965. Shipman applied for support from the Motion Picture Relief Fund, but was rejected in January 1963, with her being ruled not eligible. In 1965, she moved to California to live with Barry and then to Cabazon, California, in 1967. She worked on her memoir, The Silent Screen and My Talking Heart, after moving to Cabazon. The first volume, which covered her life up to 1925, was completed in February 1969, and it was the only part of the book she completed. Shipman died on 23 January 1970, in Cabazon, and was buried in Banning, California. Up until the end of her life she had been writing, planning new films, and retained a talent agent.

== Unrealized projects ==
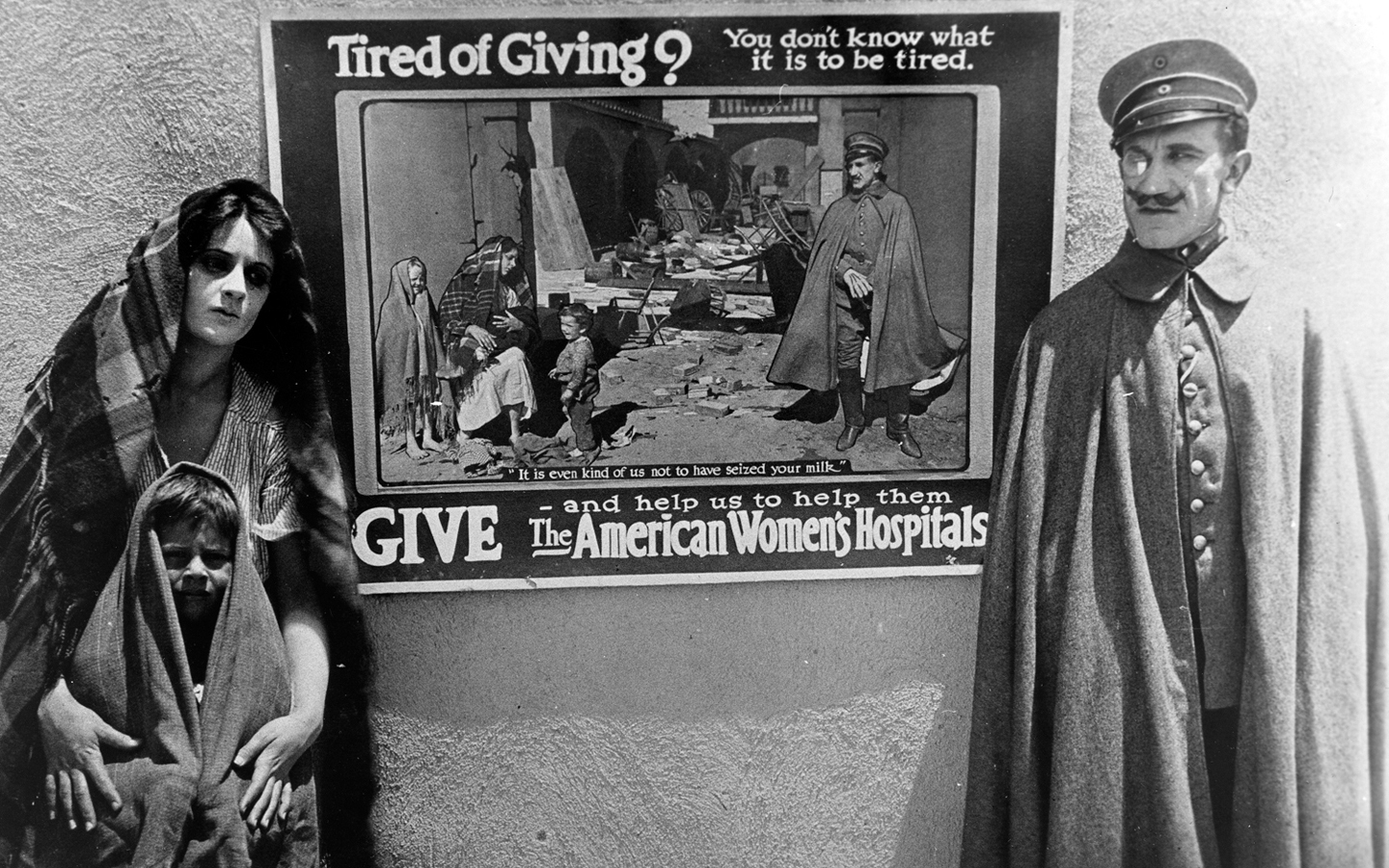
Nell Shipman participating in a fundraising event during World War I

The Last Empire, a historical feature film set in the Caribbean, was written by Shipman in 1917, and she intended to direct it. She went to the Danish West Indies to learn about the area. However, the script was never sold to any studio. After The Grub-Stake Shipman attempted to make a four-part series titled Little Dramas of the Big Places at her studio in Priest Lake. Two of the shorts, Trail of the North Wind and The Light on Lookout, were completed. She was unable to gain financing for The Purple Trail, a feature film about a woman being chased by a mountie. Jungle Ship was envisioned as a film by Shipman prior to 1935, but was repurposed to a radio drama. A record was created by Columbia Records, but it was never aired. The Catnip Mouse was a script she wrote for Jack Lemmon, but said that Bob Hope and Phyllis Diller could be added to it.

== Filmography ==
Film
Year	Title	Role	Notes	Ref.
1913	The Ball of Yarn	Screenwriter, actress		
1913	One Hundred Years of Mormonism	Screenwriter		
1913	Outwitted By Billy	Screenwriter	Lost	
1914	The Shepherd of the Southern Cross	Screenwriter		
1915	Under the Crescent	Screenwriter	Lost	
1915	The Pine's Revenge	Screenwriter		
1915	The Widow's Secret	Screenwriter		
1916	God's Country and the Woman	Actress	Lost	
1916	The Fires of Conscience	Actress	Lost	
1916	Through the Wall	Actress	Lost	
1916	The Melody of Love	Screenwriter, actress		
1916	Son o' the Stars	Screenwriter		
1917	The Black Wolf	Actress		
1917	My Fighting Gentleman	Actress and writer		
1918	The Girl from Beyond	Actress	Lost	
1918	Baree, Son of Kazan	Actress	Lost	
1918	A Gentleman's Agreement	Actress		
1918	The Home Trail	Actress	Lost	
1918	Cavanaugh of the Horse Rangers	Actress	Lost	
1918	The Wild Strain	Actress		
1919	Back to God's Country	Screenwriter, actress		
1920	Trail of the Arrow	Writer, actress, director	Lost	
1920	Something New	Writer, actress, director		
1921	A Bear, A Baby, and a Dog	Writer, editor, director		
1921	The Girl from God's Country	Writer, producer, director	Lost	
1923	The Grub-Stake	Screenwriter, editor, actress		
1923	The Light on Lookout	Actress		
1923	The Trail of the North Wind	Screenwriter, editor, actress		
1924	White Water	Writer, director, producer, and actress		
1935	Wings in the Dark	Story	Uncredited	
1946	The Clam-Digger's Daughter/The Story of Mr Hobbes	Writer		

== Works cited ==
=== Books ===
- Armatage, Kay (2003). The Girl from God's Country: Nell Shipman and the Silent Cinema. University of Toronto Press. ISBN 9781442681378.
- Förster, Annette (2017). Women in the Silent Cinema: Histories of Fame and Fate. Amsterdam University Press. ISBN 978-90-485-2451-8.
- Morris, Peter, ed. (1978). Embattled Shadows: A History of Canadian Cinema 1895-1939. McGill–Queen's University Press. ISBN 9780773560727.

=== Web ===
- "Nell Shipman". Toronto International Film Festival. Archived from the original on May 31, 2025.
- "Nell Shipman Papers, 1912-1970". Orbis Cascade Alliance. Archived from the original on May 30, 2025.

== Bibliography ==
- Pollock, Sharon (2003). Sharon Pollock Three Plays: Moving Pictures. Toronto ON: Playwrights Canada Press. ISBN 0-88754-656-0.
- Shipman, Nell (1987). The silent screen & my talking heart: an autobiography. Boise, Idaho: Boise State University. ISBN 0-932129-04-8.
- Walker, Joseph (1984). The Light on Her Face. A S C Holding Corp. ISBN 0-932129-04-8.
