= The Golden Snare =

1921 film

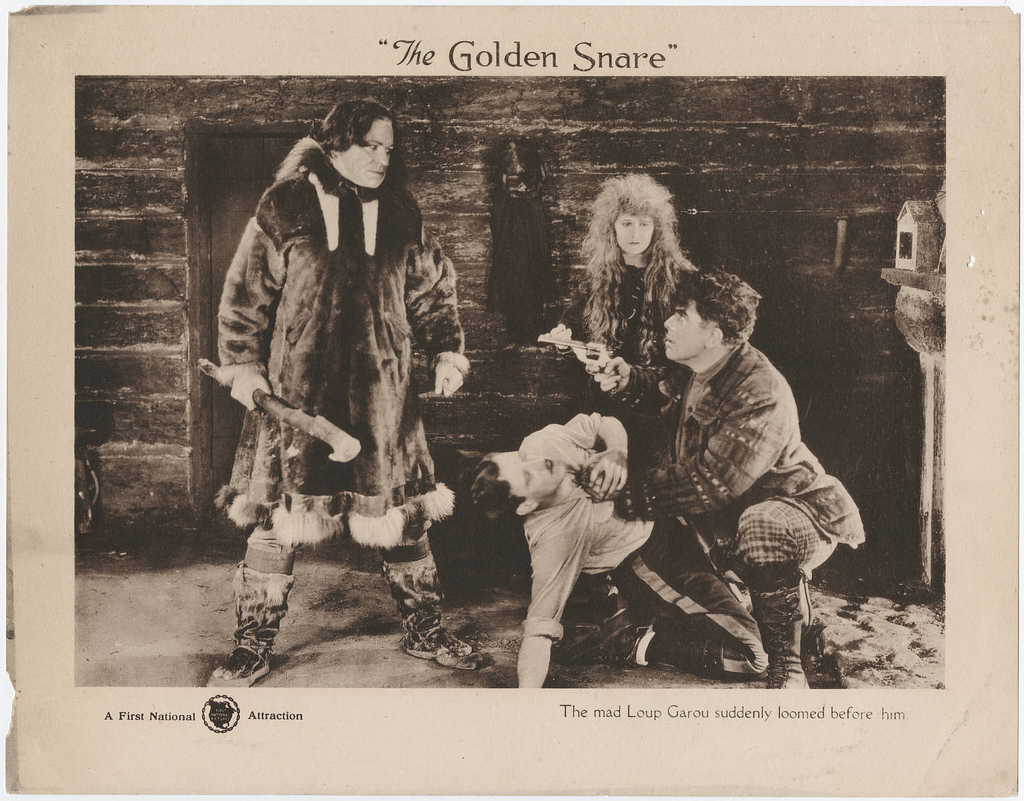
- Lobby card
- Directed by: David Hartford
- Screenplay by: David Hartford
- Based on: The Golden Snare by James Oliver Curwood
- Starring: Lewis Stone; Wallace Beery; Melbourne MacDowell; Ruth Renick; Wellington A. Playter; DeWitt Jennings
- Cinematography: Walter L. Griffin
- Production company: David Hartford Productions
- Distributed by: Associated First National Pictures
- Release date: July 10, 1921
- Running time: 60 minutes
- Country: United States
- Language: Silent (English intertitles)

The Golden Snare is a 1921 American silent drama film written and directed by David Hartford. It is based on the 1921 novel The Golden Snare by James Oliver Curwood. The film stars Lewis Stone, Wallace Beery, Melbourne MacDowell, Ruth Renick, Wellington A. Playter, and DeWitt Jennings. The film was released on July 10, 1921, by Associated First National Pictures.

== Cast ==
- Lewis Stone as Sergeant Philip Raine
- Wallace Beery as Bram Johnson
- Melbourne MacDowell as Doug Johnson
- Ruth Renick as Celie
- Wellington A. Playter as 'Black' Dawson
- DeWitt Jennings as 'Fighting' Fitzgerald
- Francis McDonald as Pierre Thoreau
- Little Esther Scott as Baby
