= The Rapids =

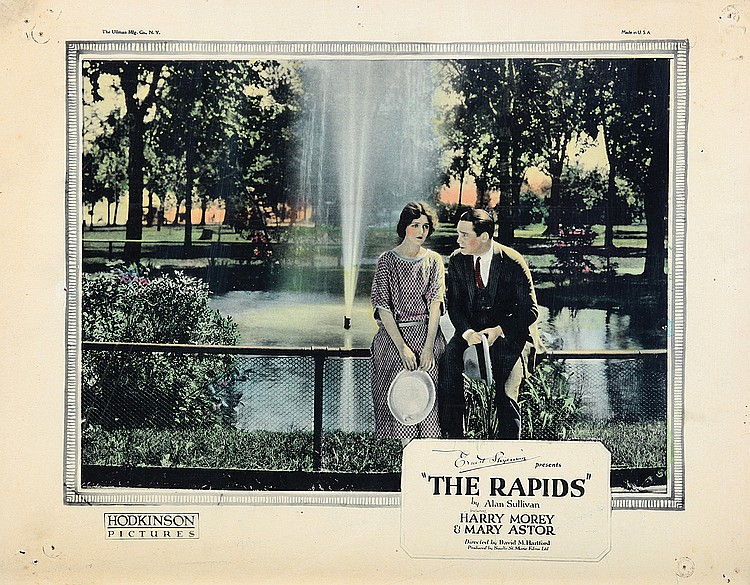
- Directed by: David Hartford
- Written by: Alan Sullivan (novel); Faith Green; Kenneth O'Hara
- Produced by: Ernest Shipman
- Starring: Mary Astor; Harry T. Morey; Walter Miller
- Cinematography: Walter L. Griffin; Ollie Sigurdson
- Production company: Sault Ste. Marie Films
- Distributed by: W.W. Hodkinson Distribution
- Release dates: October 30, 1922 (Canada); June 24, 1923 (US)
- Running time: 60 minutes
- Countries: Canada; United States
- Languages: Silent; English intertitles

The Rapids is a 1922 American-Canadian silent drama film directed by David Hartford and starring Mary Astor, Harry T. Morey and Walter Miller. Location shooting took place at the St Mary's Rapids in Northern Ontario.

== Cast ==
- Mary Astor as Elsie Worden
- Harry T. Morey as Robert Fisher Clarke
- Walter Miller as Jim Belding
- Harlan Knight as John Minton
- Charles Slattery as Henry Marsham
- Charles Wellesley as Bishop Sullivan
- John Webb Dillion as Louis Beaudette

== Bibliography ==
- Munden, Kenneth White. The American Film Institute Catalog of Motion Pictures Produced in the United States, Part 1. University of California Press, 1997.
