= Frederick William Wallace =

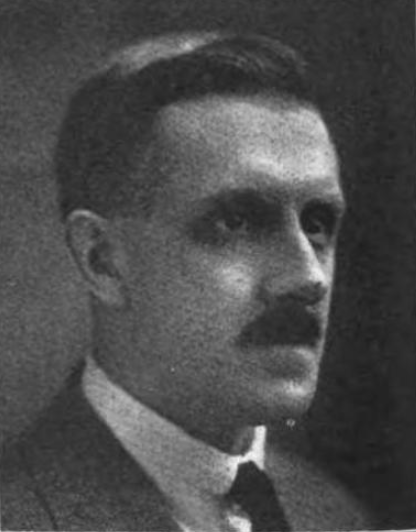
- Born: December 11, 1886; Glasgow, Scotland
- Died: July 15, 1958 (aged 71); Montreal, Quebec, Canada
- Occupations: Journalist, photographer, historian, novelist

Frederick William Wallace (December 11, 1886 – July 15, 1958) was a journalist, photographer, historian and novelist. He is best known as the author of Wooden Ships and Iron Men, a now-classic 1924 book about the last days of the Age of Sail in Maritime Canada.

== Life and career ==
Born in Glasgow, Scotland, he initially worked as a clerk but turned to the sea as a journalist of the fishing industry which later led to historical work. Wallace served in World War I as commander of a Q-Ship.

After the war, he edited the monthly journal Canadian Fisherman which would be his main occupation for forty years. This publication, which ran from 1917 to 1970, remains an important source of information for researchers today.

He would also write short stories for such pulp magazines as Adventure between 1912 and 1922

Wallace began publishing novels in 1907, beginning with Blue Water and several other works including ‘’Salt Seas and Sailormen’’ (Copyright, Canada 1922), and Captain Salvation (1925). Blue Water was made into a 1922 film starring Norma Shearer and directed by David Hartford, but it had only a limited theatrical release in saint John, where it was partly filmed. Wallace's Captain Salvation was purchased the Hearst Corporation and released as a film in 1927, directed by John S. Robertson. Both films were from the silent era.

About forty years later than he preferred to, he said, in 1924 he published Wooden Ships and Iron Men as a testament to the spirit of the Age of Sail. He followed this book with In the Wake of the Windships (1927) and Record of Canadian Shipping (1929). These three historical works became standard references to the deepwater sailing era in Canada.

In 1929 he wrote Bound for the Rio Grande, an operetta based on English shanties, performed at the 1929 CPR Festival in Vancouver. His epic poem about his time aboard the Effie M. Morrissey, "The Log of the Record Run," was widely read and adopted by east coast fishermen with such authentic results that it was mistaken as a very old traditional song by folklorist Helen Creighton.

He died in Montreal on July 15, 1958.

=== Photography ===
An accomplished photographer, in 2006 he was the subject of a book by Nova Scotia writer M. Brook Taylor entitled A Camera on the Banks, which documents seven voyages to the Newfoundland Grand Banks where he toiled alongside other fishermen, at the same time documenting their condition in photographs and words. In conjunction with the launch of Taylor's book, the Maritime Museum of the Atlantic opened an exhibit on June 6, 2006 entitled A Camera on the Banks: The Work of Frederick William Wallace, which displayed part of the museum's extensive collection of Wallace's photographs. Some of these photographs had originally appeared in the National Geographic. The Wallace exhibit has since travelled in Nova Scotia to Lunenburg, Annapolis Royal, Digby and Shelburne. A bilingual version opened at the Canada Science and Technology Museum in Ottawa, Ontario on September 17, 2008.

== Publications ==
- Blue Water: A Tale of the Deep Sea Fishermen, Toronto: Musson, 1907. Film version
- The Shack-Locker, 1916.
- The Viking Blood, 1920.
- Salt Seas And Sailormen, 1922.
- Wooden Ships and Iron Men: The story of the square-rigged merchant marine of British North America, the ships, their builders and owners, and the men who sailed them, London : Hodder and Stoughton, 1924 (reprinted by White Lion (London) in 1973).
- Captain Salvation, Grosset & Dunlap, 1925 (reprinted in 2005 by Formac with an introduction by Brook Taylor) ISBN 0-88780-676-7
- Tea From China, 1926.
- In the Wake of the Wind-Ships , London : Hodder and Stoughton, 1927.
- Record of Canadian Shipping: A List of Square-Rigged Vessels, Mainly 500 tons and over built in the Eastern Provinces of British North America from the Year 1786 to 1920, Toronto: Musson, 1929.
- The Romance of a Great Port: The Story of Saint John New Brunswick, Saint John: Barnes & Co., 1935.
- Under Sail in the Last of the Clippers, Boston: Charles E. Lauriat, 1936.
- Canadian Fisheries Manual: Thirty Years Progress in Canada's Fish Industry (1914-44)
- Roving Fisherman: an autobiography recounting personal experiences in the commercial fishing fleets and fish industry of Canada and the United States, 1911–1924, Gardenvale, Quebec: Canadian Fisherman, 1955.
