= God's Crucible (1921 film) =

1921 film

The Foreigner
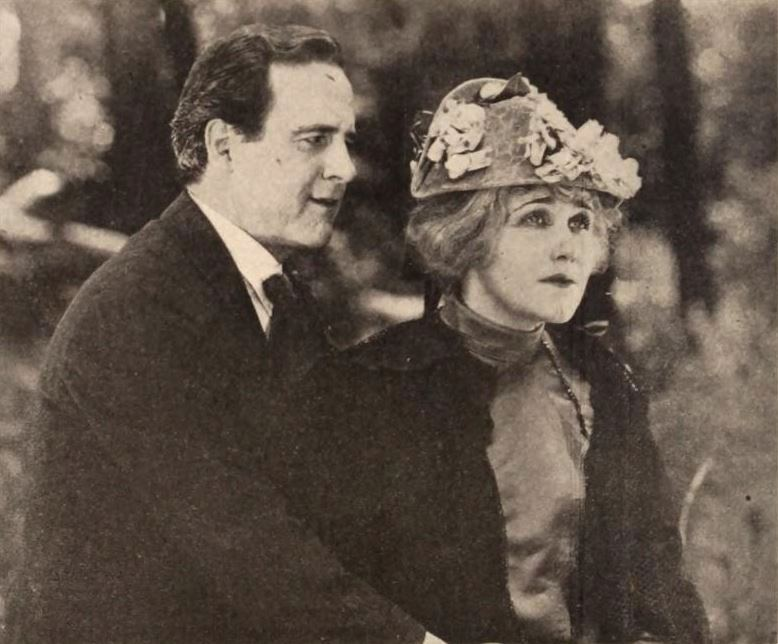
- Directed by: Henry MacRae
- Screenplay by: Faith Green; Ralph Connor (novel)
- Starring: Gaston Glass; Gladys Coburn; Wilton Lackaye
- Cinematography: William James Craft; William Thornley
- Production company: Winnipeg Productions
- Distributed by: W. W. Hodkinson Corporation
- Release dates: September 25, 1921 (USA); April 20, 1922 (Canada)

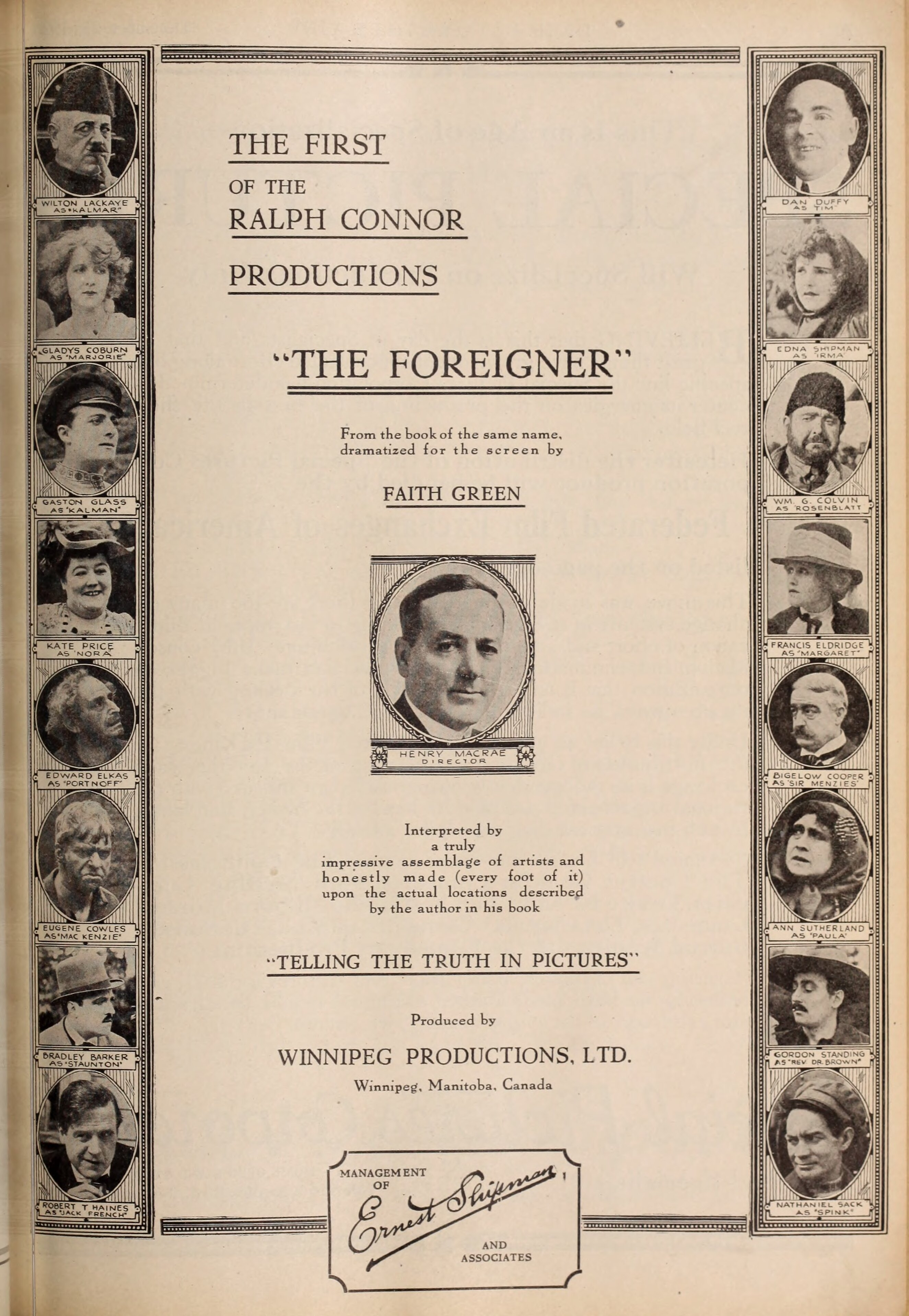
Advertisement for God's Crucible under the title The Foreigner

God's Crucible (also known as The Foreigner) is a lost 1921 Canadian silent religious melodrama directed by Henry MacRae and written by Faith Green, based on a Ralph Connor novel called The Foreigner. The film was narrated by Ernest Shipman.

== Plot ==
A young political refugee flees to Winnipeg to escape Russian enemies, where his resolve is tested in the snow-capped mountains, his violin his only company. Eventually, he is rewarded for toughing it out.

== Cast ==
- Gaston Glass as Ivan Kalmar
- Gladys Coburn as Marjorie Menzies
- Wilton Lackaye as Michael Kalmar
- Edna Shipman as Irma Kalmar
- Anne Sutherland as Kalmars' Servant
- Frances Eldridge as Hope French or Margaret

== Production ==
The film was shot in and around Winnipeg.
