= Then Came the Woman =

1926 film

- Directed by: David Hartford
- Written by: David Hartford
- Produced by: David Hartford
- Starring: Frank Mayo; Cullen Landis; Mildred Ryan
- Cinematography: Walter L. Griffin
- Production company: David Hartford Productions
- Distributed by: American Cinema Association
- Release date: June 9, 1926
- Running time: 72 minutes
- Country: United States
- Languages: Silent; English intertitles

Then Came the Woman is a 1926 American silent romantic drama film directed by David Hartford and starring Frank Mayo, Cullen Landis, and Mildred Ryan.

== Plot ==
As described in a film magazine review, the ungovernable temper of Robert Morris causes him to be expelled from college. His father gives him one more chance to make good, but his temper again gets him into trouble and his father orders him out of the home. Bob rides the bumper of a freight train and, after being kicked off, picks up with a troup of hobos who have just stolen a chicken. When caught, they flee to leave Bob to face the music. He is befriended by lumber king John Hobart who gives him a chance by employing him in one of his mills. Then comes Mary, the sister of a friend of Hobart, who hopes to marry her. Hobart soon realizes that Mary prefers the younger man, Bob, but plays the romance game fairly and squarely. Mary and Bob go to town to get Hobart a birthday gift, are trapped by a forest fire, and then are rescued by Hobart. Meantime Bob's father learns of his son's reform and upon arriving is told by Hobart that Bob is going to marry Mary. They both recognize the sacrifice that Hobart has made in giving up any claim to Mary's affections.

== Cast ==
- Frank Mayo as John Hobart
- Cullen Landis as Bob Morris
- Mildred Ryan as Mary
- Blanche Craig as Mrs. McCann
- Tom Maguire as Mr. McCann

== Production ==
Then Came the Woman was filmed on location in Grosse Pointe, Michigan, and Brevard, North Carolina.

== Preservation ==
With no prints of Then Came the Woman located in any film archives, it is a lost film.

== Bibliography ==
- Munden, Kenneth White. The American Film Institute Catalog of Motion Pictures Produced in the United States, Part 1. University of California Press, 1997.
