= Joseph-Arthur Homier =

Joseph-Arthur Homier (born 1875 in Montreal – died 1934 in Montreal) was the first director of feature-length films in Quebec. A renowned professional photographer and amateur playwright, in 1922 Homier directed Oh! Oh! Jean, a slapstick comedy about a servant who courts a widow. The film's success enabled Homier to found the Le Bon Cinéma National company, which in 1922 produced his next film, Madeleine de Verchères, an epic historical drama written by his 18-year-old collaborator Emma Gendron, a Montreal journalist. Filmed in Kahnawake, the film tells the story of the celebrated 17th century Quebec heroine, Madeleine de Verchères.

Homier changed the name of his company to Le Cinéma Canadien, set up a studio in Montreal, and, working again with Gendron, made La drogue fatale (1923), a drama about the social harm caused by drugs. Although he made English and French versions of this film, he was not able to cover his expenses. As with his earlier efforts, the film was well received but generated little profit because of its limited distribution in Quebec. As a result, Homier abandoned cinema and devoted himself to photography.
