= Auld Kirk Scotch Settlement =

Coordinates: 44.0897°N 79.6153°W

The Auld Kirk Scotch Settlement is a historic settlement located in the former township of West Gwillimbury (now Bradford West Gwillimbury). It is located on the 6th Line, west of the 10th Sideroad, street number 3380. The church is one of several old Presbyterian churches that merged to form St. John's Presbyterian Church in Bradford West Gwillimbury.

== History ==
There is a plaque erected by the Ontario Archaeological and Historic Sites that is situated in front of the present day church. It states "In 1815 some 140 Highland Scots from Lord Selkirk's Red River Colony, disheartened by crop failures and the opposition of the North West Company, moved to Upper Canada.

After traversing the five hundred miles of rocky wilderness between Fort Garry and Fort William, they were transported in the Nor 'Westers' canoes, to the outlet of the Nottawasaga River, which they ascended to Willow Creek, thence over the nine-mile portage to the head of Kempenfelt Bay. From there, the fugitives crossed Lake Simcoe, to the southern end of Cook's Bay, where they disembarked at Holland Landing in September. They found temporary employment in the Yonge Street settlements but in 1819 many took up land in West Gwillimbury.

In 1823 Presbyterian services were held in a building on this site which was replaced by a frame church in 1827. The present structure was completed in 1869." The Auld Kirk Scotch Settlement was the first and largest settlement in all of Simcoe County. The Sermons at the church were held in Gaelic from the settlers native Scotland. Many of the original settlers of the area were buried in the cemetery within the church property, which still exists to this day. Presbyterian services ended around 1940 when the church proved to be outdated and too small for services.

== Today ==
The church and graveyard are the last key pieces of evidence of the Auld Kirk Scotch Settlement's existence to this day. Many of the farms surrounding the historic site are large. The road it is located on once traveled from one end of West Gwillimbury to the other, but is now nothing more than a gravel road that is cut off at the Kings Highway 400. The historic site rarely will see visitors as it is very isolated. The church and graveyard are surrounded by a fence. The church and its property are kept in preservation and are well maintained. It is now possible to see inside the church. The graveyard contains several tombstones, which date as early to the beginning of the settlement, however, the tombstones can sometimes be misinterpreted as they are very old. The Scotch Settlement is seen as the founding settlement of the West Gwillimbury area and South Simcoe county.
