= Captain Salvation (film) =

1927 film by John S. Robertson

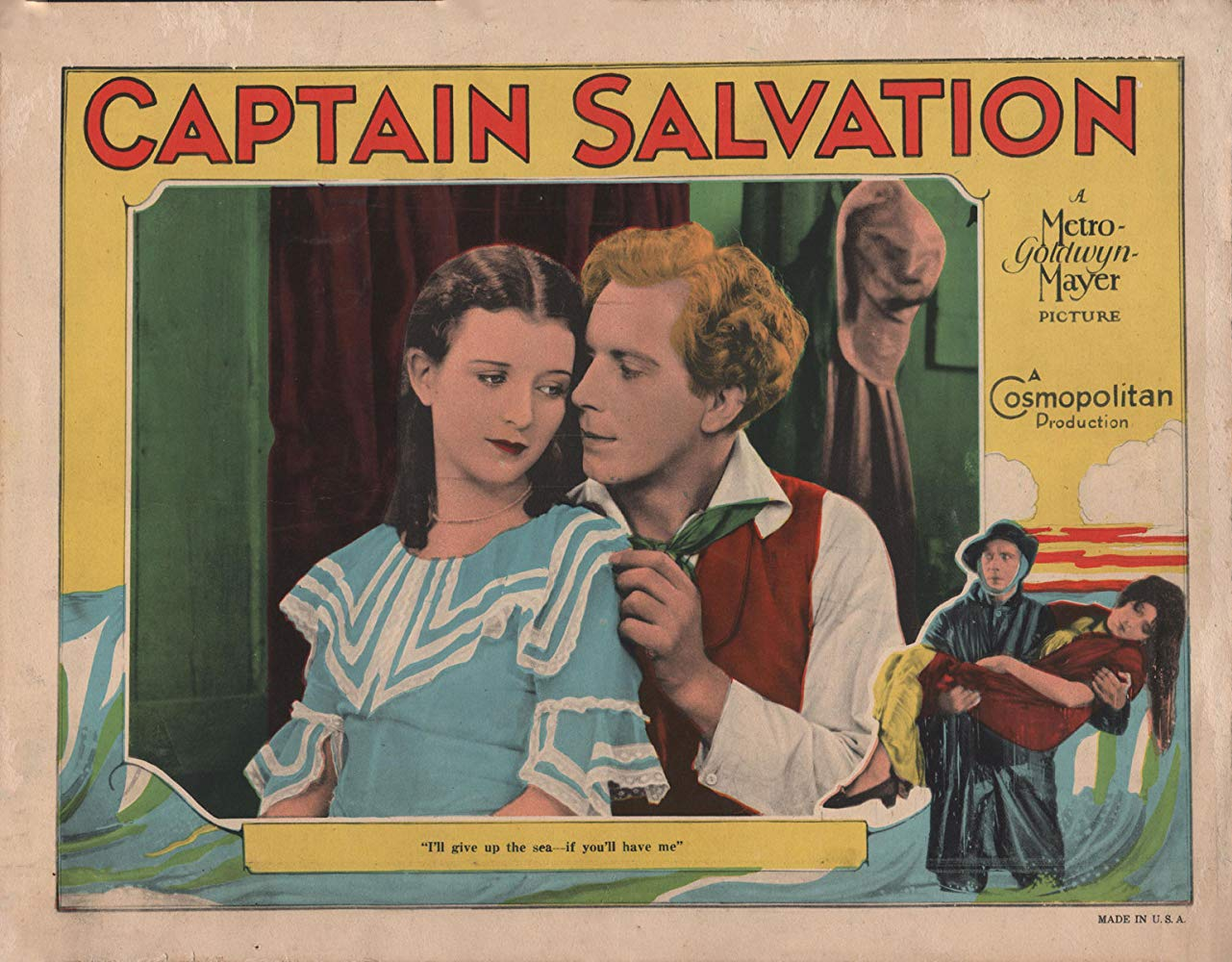
- Directed by: John S. Robertson
- Written by: Jack Cunningham; intertitles written by John Colton
- Based on: Captain Salvation; 1925 novel by Frederick William Wallace
- Produced by: Cosmopolitan Productions
- Starring: Lars Hanson; Pauline Starke; Marceline Day
- Cinematography: William Daniels
- Edited by: William Hamilton
- Production companies: Metro-Goldwyn-Mayer; Cosmopolitan Productions
- Distributed by: Metro-Goldwyn-Mayer
- Release date: May 14, 1927
- Running time: 87 minutes 8 reels (7,395ft)
- Country: United States
- Language: Silent film

Captain Salvation is a 1927 American silent drama film directed by John S. Robertson and released by Metro-Goldwyn-Mayer. It stars Lars Hanson, Pauline Starke and Marceline Day. On January 18, 2010 the film had its first home video release on the Warner Archives series.

== Plot ==
A young seminarian comes to the aid of an injured prostitute in a small New England town, despite the townspeople calling for her to be run out of town. His actions jeopardize not only his impending marriage but also his reputation in the town where he was to be a minister.

== Cast ==
- Lars Hanson as Anson Campbell
- Marceline Day as Mary Phillips
- Pauline Starke as Bess Morgan
- Ernest Torrence as Captain
- George Fawcett as Zeke Crosby
- Sam De Grasse as Peter Campbell
- Jay Hunt as Nathan Phillips
- Eugenie Besserer as Mrs. Buxom
- Eugenie Forde as Mrs. Bellows
- Flora Finch as Mrs. Snifty
- James A. Marcus as Old Sea Salt
