= Blue Water (film) =

Lost 1924 silent film by David Hartford

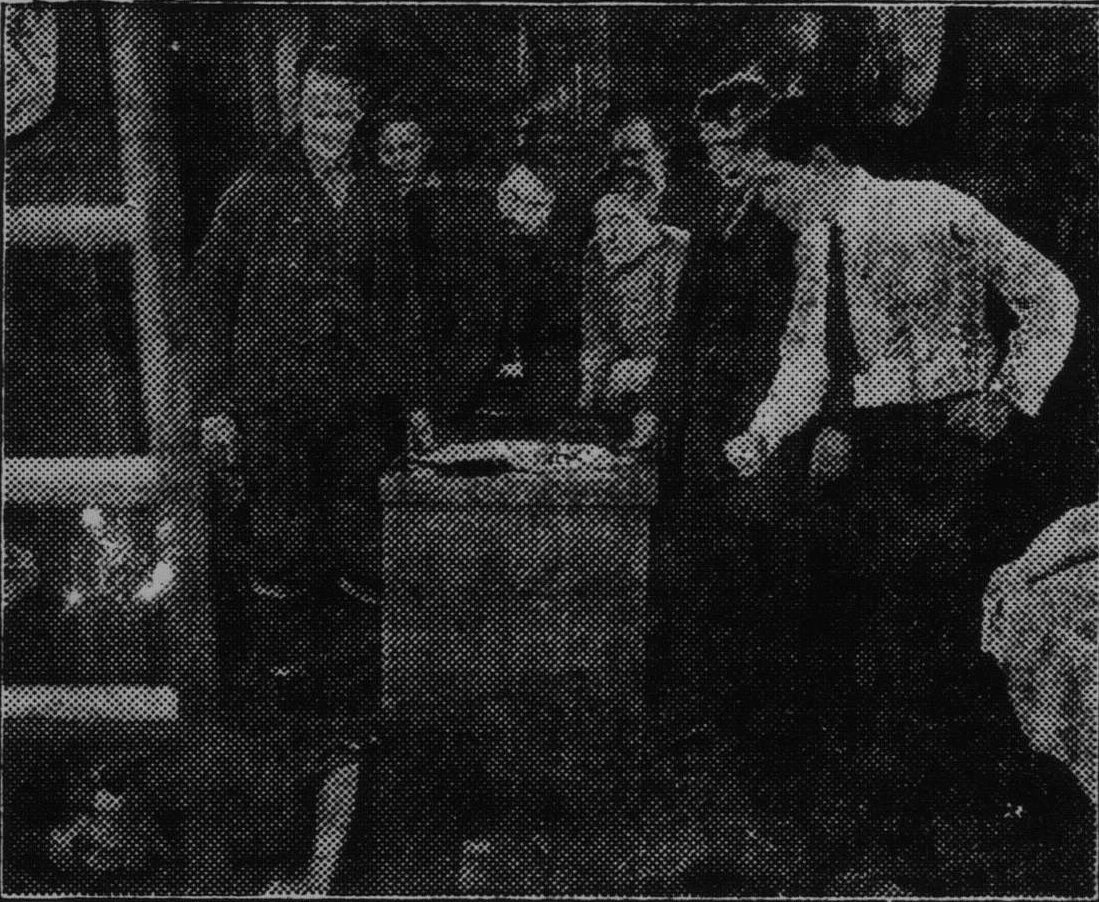
- Snippet of the film from a newspaper
- Directed by: David Hartford
- Written by: Faith Green; Frederick William Wallace (novel)
- Produced by: Ernest Shipman
- Cinematography: Walter L. Griffin
- Production company: New Brunswick Films
- Distributed by: Ernest Shipman Films
- Release date: 16 April 1924
- Country: Canada
- Languages: Silent; English intertitles

Blue Water is a lost 1924 Canadian silent film directed by David Hartford and starring Pierre Gendron, Jane Thomas, and Norma Shearer. It is the last feature produced by Ernest Shipman, and is the Montreal-born, future MGM star Shearer's only Canadian film. It had a commercial release in Saint John, New Brunswick, where it was shot, but no print is known to exist. The film failed to succeed commercially, marking Shipman's decline in success until his death in 1931. Without being distributed, the film was stored in a New York vault.

The film has no surviving copies, making it a lost film.

== Cast ==
- Pierre Gendron as Jimmie Westhaver
- Jane Thomas as Carrie
- Norma Shearer as Lillian Denton
- John Webb Dillon
- Harlan Knight
- Louis Darclay

== Bibliography ==
- Jack Jacobs & Myron Braum. The films of Norma Shearer. A. S. Barnes, 1976.
