= The Man from Glengarry =

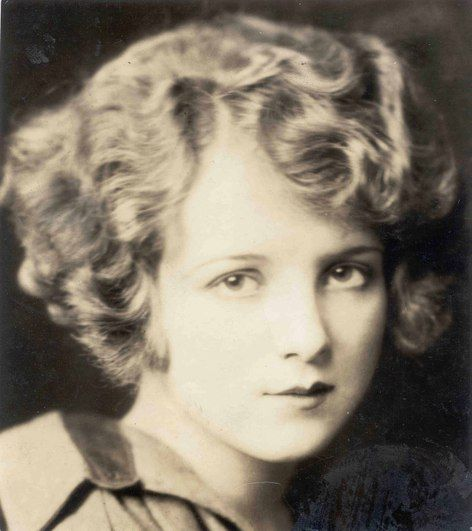
- Still of Pauline Garon from the film.
- Directed by: Henry MacRae
- Written by: Faith Green; Kenneth O'Hara
- Based on: The Man from Glengarry by Ralph Connor
- Produced by: Ernest Shipman
- Starring: Anders Randolf; Warner Richmond; Harlan Knight
- Cinematography: Jacques Bizeul; Barney McGill
- Edited by: Elmer J. McGovern
- Production company: Ernest Shipman Productions
- Distributed by: W.W. Hodkinson Distribution
- Release date: December 10, 1922 (Canada)
- Running time: 60 minutes
- Countries: Canada; United States
- Language: Silent (English intertitles)

The Man from Glengarry is a 1922 American-Canadian silent drama film directed by Henry MacRae and starring Anders Randolf, Warner Richmond, and Pauline Garon. It is based on the 1901 novel of the same title by Ralph Connor. The film was distributed in the United States by W.W. Hodkinson in 1923. It was one of three silent films directed by MacRae based on the works of Connor.

== Plot ==
Heads of rival lumber camps meet in a fight. Louis Lenoir, a renegade French Canadian, causes the death of "Big" MacDonald, a hard-fighting Scotsman whose life is guided by his dogmatic religious beliefs. His son, Ranald, is left to settle the blood feud. In spite of the pleas of his sweetheart, the daughter of a minister, he participates in a gang fight on the logs in mid-river just as a log drive to Ottawa begins. Attempting to stop the fight, the girl becomes involved, falls into danger, and is carried toward a whirlpool; but MacDonald, having abandoned his attack on Lenoir, rescues her. At the finish Lenoir, grateful because his life has been spared, experiences a reformation.

== Cast ==
- Anders Randolf as Big MacDonald
- Warner Richmond as Ronald MacDonald
- Pauline Garon as Mamie St. Clair
- Harlan Knight as Rev. Alexander Murray
- Marian Swayne as Kate Murray
- E.L. Fernandez as Louis Lenoir
- Jack Newton as Eugene St. Clair
- Frank Badgley as Frank De Lacey
- William Colvin as Col. Thorpe
- Marion Lloyd as Kerstin McLeod

== Preservation ==
With no prints of The Man from Glengarry located in any film archives, it is a lost film.

== Bibliography ==
- Robert B. Connelly. The Silents: Silent Feature Films, 1910-36, Volume 40, Issue 2. December Press, 1998.
