= Cameron of the Royal Mounted =

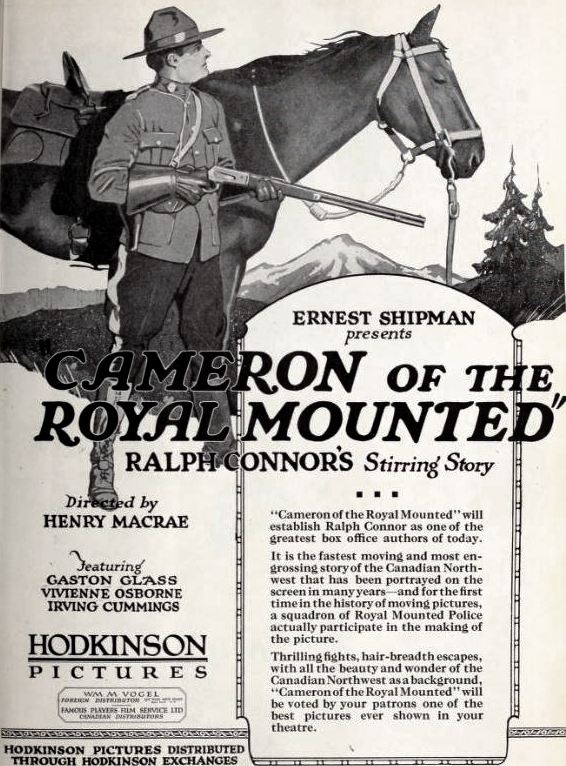
- Directed by: Henry MacRae
- Written by: Ralph Connor (novel); Faith Green
- Produced by: Ernest Shipman
- Starring: Gaston Glass; Irving Cummings; Vivienne Osborne
- Cinematography: William James Craft; Tony Kornman; William Thornley
- Production company: Winnipeg Productions
- Distributed by: W.W. Hodkinson Distribution
- Release date: December 25, 1921
- Running time: 66 minutes
- Country: Canada
- Languages: Silent; English intertitles

Cameron of the Royal Mounted is a 1921 Canadian silent Western film directed by Henry MacRae and starring Gaston Glass, Irving Cummings and Vivienne Osborne. Part of the tradition of Northerns, it is based on the story Corporal Cameron by Ralph Connor about a young Scottish immigrant who joins the Mounties.

Mostly lost, only one-third of the film is held at the National Film Archives at Ottawa.

== Cast ==
- Gaston Glass as Cpl. Cameron
- Irving Cummings as Dick Raven
- Vivienne Osborne as Mandy Haley
- Frank Lanning as Little Thunder
- George Larkin as Andre Potts
- Joseph Singleton as Jim Haley
- Marion McDonald as Mrs. Haley
- Gordon Griffith

== Bibliography ==
- Langman, Larry. A Guide to Silent Westerns. Greenwood Publishing Group, 1992.
