= Ernest Shipman =

Canadian film producer

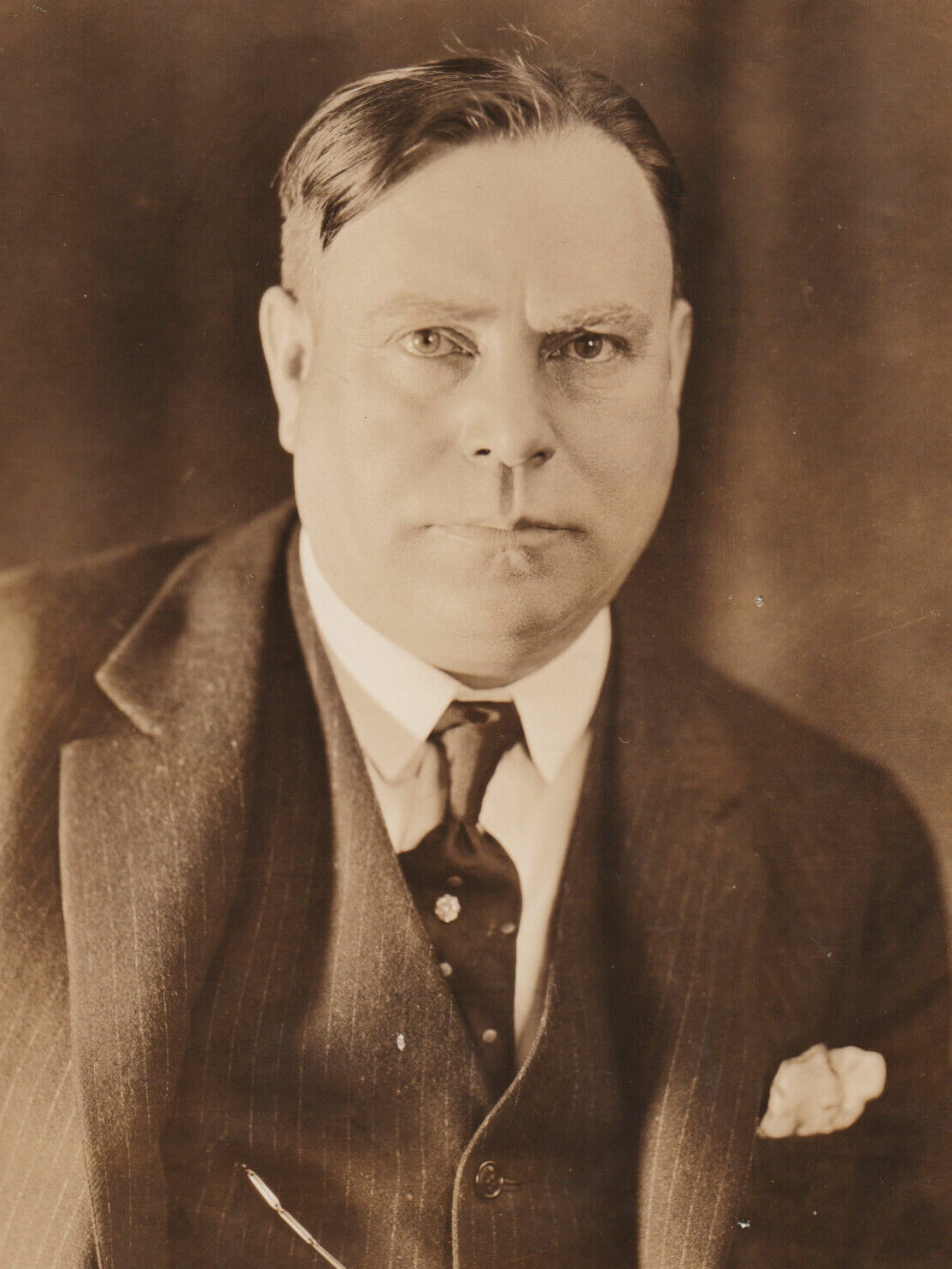
- Shipman, c. 1924
- Born: December 16, 1871; Almonte, Ontario, Canada
- Died: August 7, 1931 (aged 59); New York City, New York, U.S.
- Education: Ryerson School
- Occupation: Producer
- Spouses: Roselle Knott (div. 1912); Helen Barham (before 1931)

Ernest G. Shipman (December 16, 1871, in Shipman's Mills (now Almonte), Ontario, Canada – August 7, 1931, in New York City) was Canada's most successful film producer during the silent period. Shipman, whose nickname was "Ten Percent Ernie," made seven features from 1919 to 1923.

== Biography ==
Shipman was educated at the Ryerson School (now Toronto Metropolitan University) in Toronto, Ontario and became interested in promotion and publicity. At 26 he was running the Canadian Entertainment Bureau in Toronto and soon after was the president and general manager of the Amalgamated Amusement Company with offices on Broadway in New York City.

In 1912, he divorced his third wife, actress Roselle Knott, and married his fourth wife, Nell (born Helen Barham) from Victoria, B.C., who was 18 at the time. Ernest and Nell Shipman travelled to California in 1912, where he promoted films written by and starring his young wife. The couple returned to Canada in 1918, where Shipman produced Back to God's Country again written by and starring Nell. The film became the biggest box-office success of any Canadian feature during the silent era. The Shipmans separated shortly thereafter, and Ernest moved on to produce six other films across the country, although none were profitable as his first.

In Canadian film historian Peter Morris’ book Embattled Shadows: A History of Canadian Cinema 1895-1939, Morris describes Shipman thusly: "It is difficult in retrospect to decide whether Shipman was a rogue or a genius. Perhaps like all great entrepreneurs he was a little of both. A typical example of the ‘Diamond Jim’ kind of opportunistic promoter who flourished in North America in the late 19th century, he went through two fortunes and five wives during the course of his chequered career, eventually dying at 59 of the bon vivieur’s disease, cirrhosis of the liver. Nell Shipman, the fourth Mrs. Shipman and herself a talented producer, actress and writer, described him affectionately. ‘Men like Ernie made the Nineties gay. A vanished breed. He had the bounce of a rubber ball, the buoyance of a balloon… He was one of the great cocksmen of his time, not immoral but amoral, not lascivious but lusty. If they named him dishonest he was always within the law’s fences contractually and the 10 percent he required of his minions’ wages he considered a fair return for his efforts on their behalf.’"

== Filmography ==
- Back to God's Country (1919)
- God’s Crucible (1921)
- Cameron of the Royal Mounted (1921)
- The Man from Glengarry (1922)
- The Rapids (1922)
- Glengarry School Days (1923)
- Blue Water (1924)
