= David Hartford =

American film director

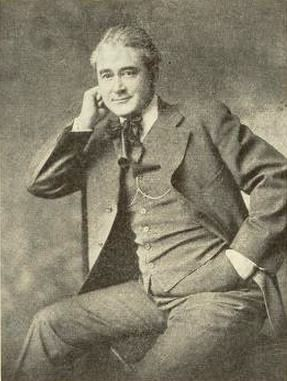
From a 1921 magazine

David Hartford (1873–1932) was an American actor and film director best known for directing the movie Back to God's Country (1919).

== Selected filmography ==
- The Dead End (1914)
- Tess of the Storm Country (1914)
- The Bride of Hate (1917)
- Blood Will Tell (1917)
- Madam Who? (1918)
- The Turn of a Card (1918)
- Inside the Lines (1918)
- Rose o' Paradise (1918)
- It Happened in Paris (1919, co-directed with Richard Gordon Matzene)
- Back to God's Country (1919)
- Nomads of the North (1920)
- The Golden Snare (1921)
- The Rapids (1922)
- Blue Water (1924)
- Then Came the Woman (1926)
- The Man in the Shadow (1926)
- God's Great Wilderness (1927)
- Rose of the Bowery (1927)
- Rough Romance (1930)
- Over the Hill (1931)
