= Cinema of Canada =

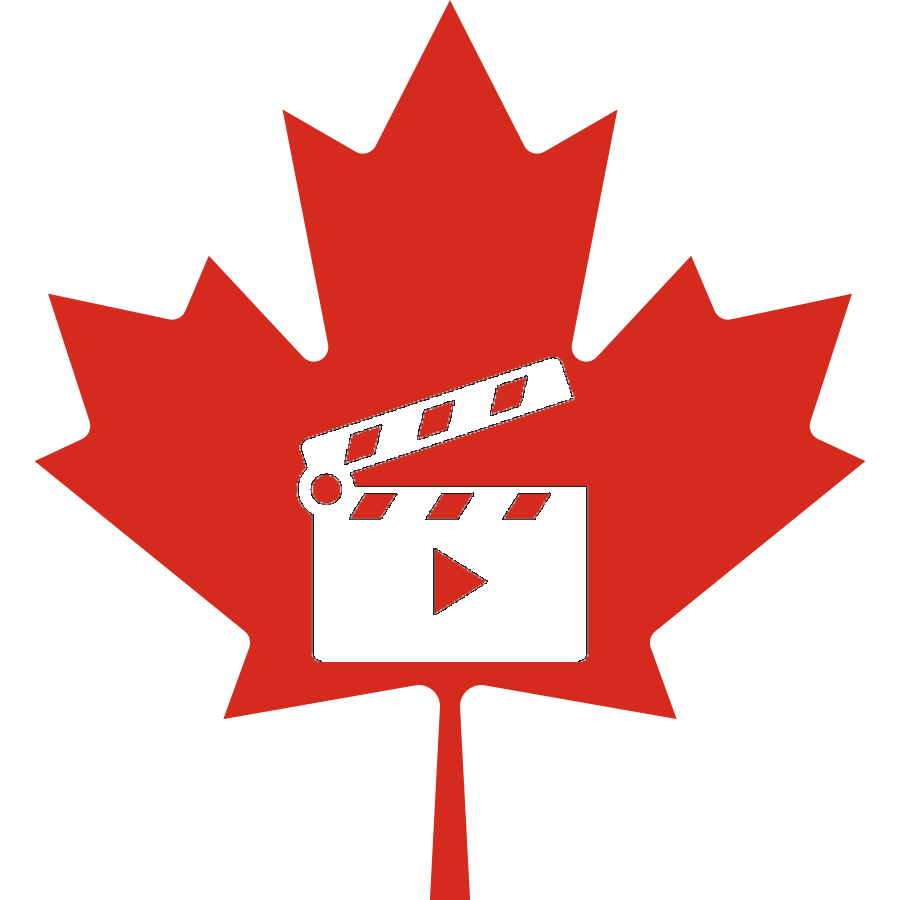
- No. of screens: 3,114 (2015)
  - Per capita: 9.6 per 100,000 (2015)
- Main distributors: Universal 20.9% Disney 18.7% Warner Bros. 13.3%

Produced feature films (2015)
- Total: 103
- Fictional: 77 (74.8%)
- Documentary: 26 (25.2%)

Number of admissions (2015)
- Total: 118,000,000

Gross box office (2015)
- Total: C$986 million
- National films: C$18.8 million (1.9%)

The cinema of Canada dates back to the earliest known display of film in Saint-Laurent, Quebec, in 1896. The film industry in Canada has been dominated by the United States, which has utilized Canada as a shooting location and to bypass British film quota laws. Canadian filmmakers, English and French, have been active in the development of cinema in the United States and cinema in the United Kingdom.

Films by Thomas A. Edison, Inc. were some of the first to arrive in Canada and early films made in the country were produced by Edison Studios. Canadian Pacific Railway and other railways supported early filmmaking including James Freer, whose Ten Years in Manitoba was the first known film by a Canadian. Evangeline is the earliest recorded Canadian feature film. George Brownridge and Ernest Shipman were major figures in Canadian cinema in the 1920s and 1930s. Shipman oversaw the production the most expensive film up to that point. Brownridge's career led to Carry on, Sergeant! and its failure caused a decline in the film industry.

The Canadian Government Motion Picture Bureau was formed in 1918, and expanded to sound and 16 mm film in the 1930s before merging into the National Film Board of Canada. The NFB expanded under the leadership of John Grierson. The Canadian Cooperation Project between the government and Motion Picture Association of America from 1948 to 1958, negatively affected Canadian filmmaking. Internal divisions between English and French Canadians within the NFB starting in the 1940s led to the creation of an independent branch for French language productions by the 1960s. The government provided financial support to the film industry through the Capital Cost Allowance and Telefilm Canada.

== History ==
=== Film ===
==== Arrival of film ====
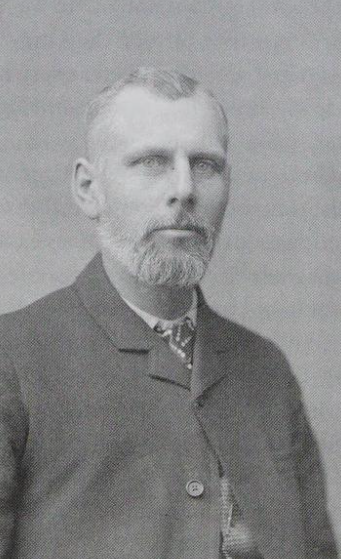
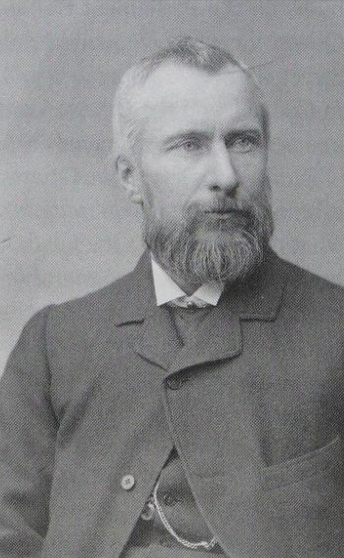
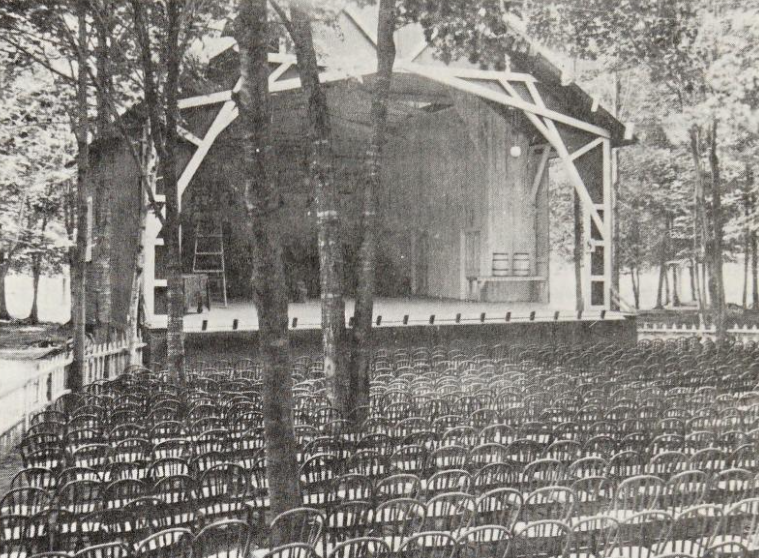
A film showing by Andrew M. Holland and George C. Holland was incorrectly viewed as the first in Canadian history until 1984. Their showing was conducted in West End Park, Ottawa (pictured 1892).

Louis Minier and Louis Pupier showed the first films in Canada using a cinematograph in Saint-Laurent, Quebec, on 27 June 1896. Prior to the discovery of this showing by Germain Lacasse in 1984, it was believed that a showing of Thomas A. Edison, Inc. films conducted by Andrew M. Holland in Ottawa, from 21 July to 28 August 1896, was the first. The Saint-Laurent showing was overlooked as English researchers did not search through French sources. Léo-Ernest Ouimet stated that he attended the showing and he was used as evidence of it until Lacasse found newspaper coverage of the event in La Presse.

R.A. Hardie and F.H. Wall also presented films in Winnipeg from 18 to 25 July 1896. Marie Tréourret de Kerstrat and her son Henry de Grandsaignes d'Hauterives were some of the first French people to display films to French Canadians and projected hundreds during their tours from 1897 to 1906. They showed 8,000 feet of hand-coloured film done by Georges Méliès, which is the earliest known colour film shown in Canada.

The development of a Canadian film industry was hampered by the country's low population density, it had six million inhabitants with only Toronto and Montreal had more than 100,000 people in 1905, and the lack of domestic vaudeville as most of the acts came from the United States, United Kingdom, and France. Andrew Holland was critical of Canada as a place for the film industry due to the quality of its films, distance between major urban areas, and different electrical systems. Early films were used to as promotional material for companies, promote immigration, or displays of scenic locations including Niagara Falls. The Edison Company created some of the first films in Canada by documenting the Klondike Gold Rush, Canadian soldiers leaving to fight in the Second Boer War, and George V, the Duke of York, arriving in Canada in 1902.

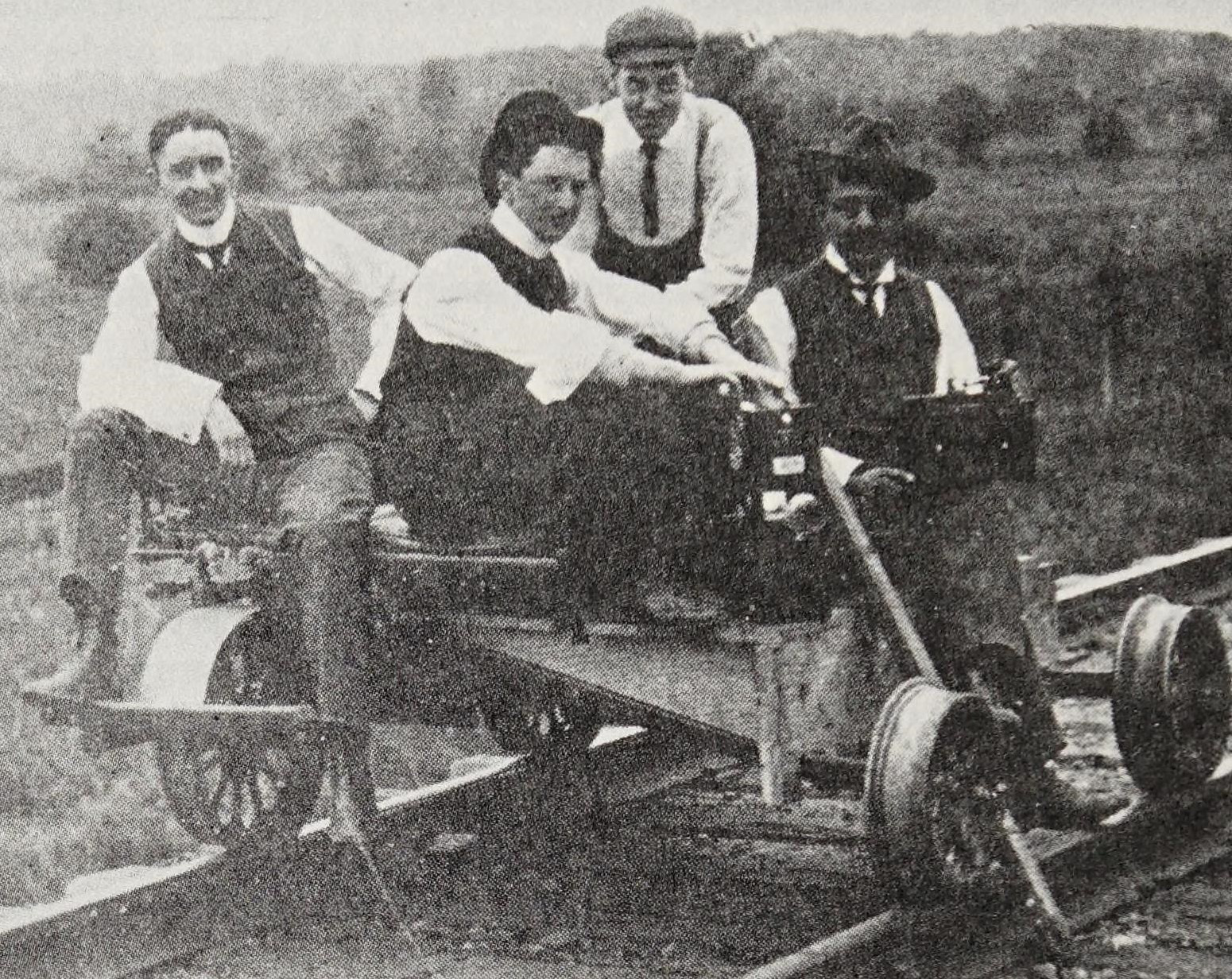
Charles Urban's Bioscope Company of Canada in 1903

James Freer is believed to have been the first Canadian to produce films. He started filming agriculture activities and Canadian Pacific Railway trains in 1897. He toured the United Kingdom with the sponsorship of the CPR in 1898, and a second less successful tour was sponsored by Clifford Sifton in 1901. His second tour was the first time that the government was directly involved with film. British and American filmmakers were selected as they could guarantee the distribution of their films unlike Canadian filmmakers.

The CPR enlisted Charles Urban and his company to travel and film Canada to promote settlement in the western areas. This group, the Bioscope Company of Canada, filmed in Quebec to Victoria from 1902 to 1903. The film, Living Canada, was premiered at the Palace Theatre in 1903, with High Commissioner Donald Smith in attendance. A total of 35 Living Canada films were released by 1904, and were edited into Wonders of Canada in 1906. Urban's success led to him gaining contracts with the government of British Columbia and the Northern Railway Company. The Grand Trunk Railway entered the industry by hiring Butcher's Film Service in 1909. The CPR hired the Edison Company to film in Canada and they sent nine people, including J. Searle Dawley, Henry Cronjager, and Mabel Trunnelle, in 1910. They were provided a specialized train and the RMS Empress of India and produced 13 films.

==== Creating an independent film industry ====
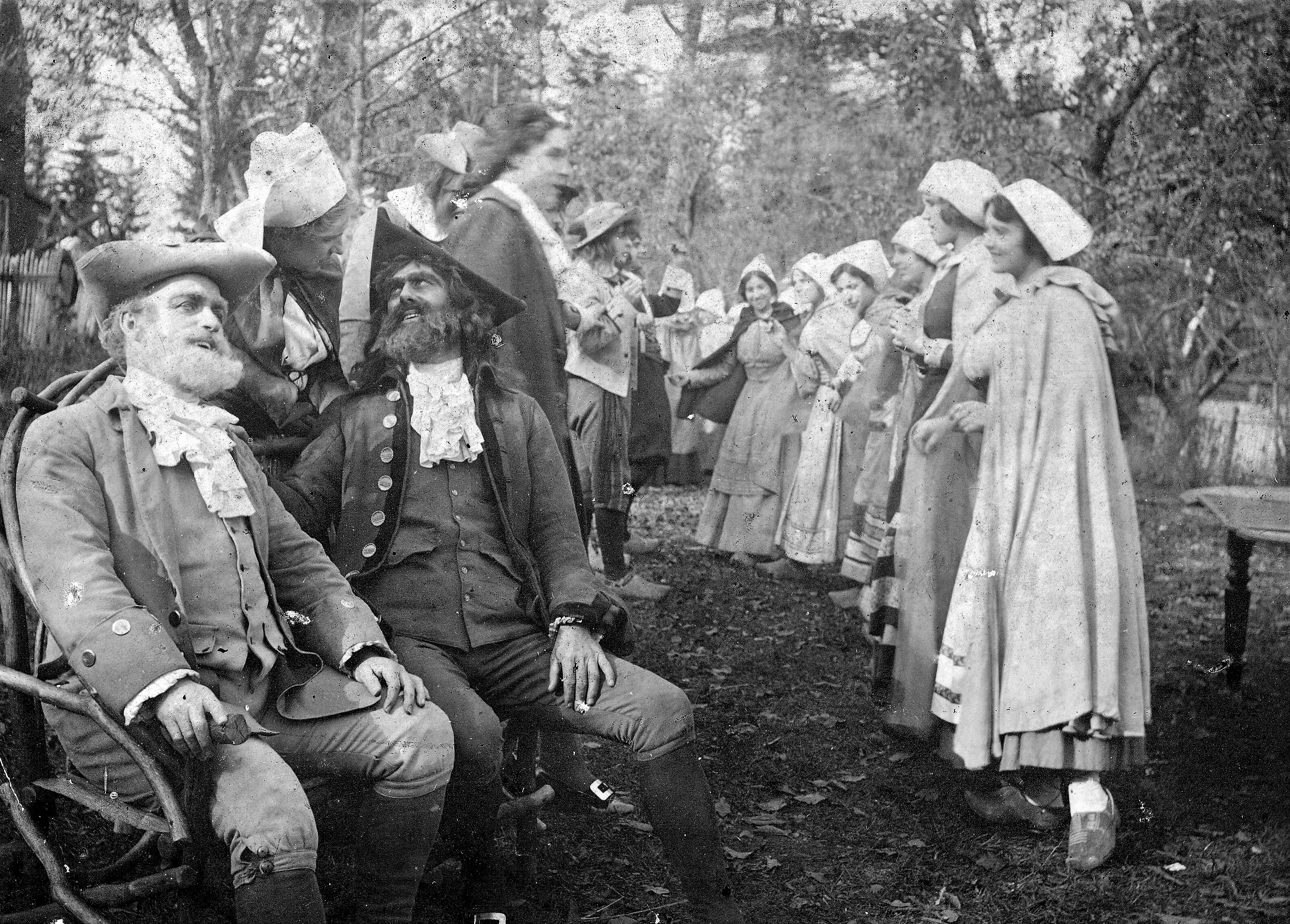
Evangeline is the earliest recorded feature film in Canadian history.

The first recorded feature film created in Canada was Evangeline. There were multiple attempts to create an independent film industry in Canada in the early 20th century. Thirty-six companies meant for film production were created between 1914 and 1922, but the majority of the companies did not produce any films.

Silent films used intertitles in English and French, but sound films were mostly produced in English. The Palace was the first theatre to transition to showing sound films when it presented Street Angel on 1 September 1928.

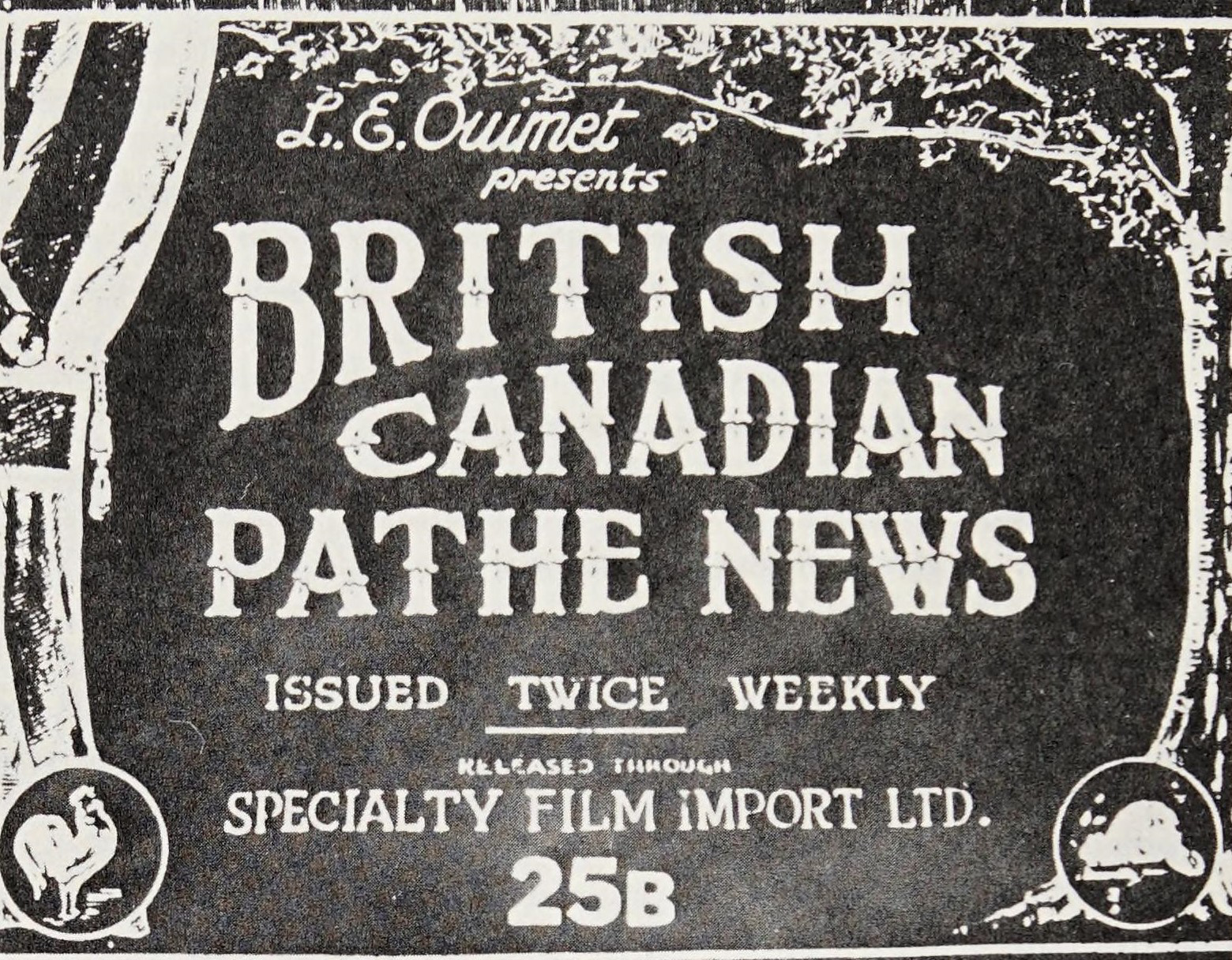
The title card of British Canadian Pathe News as presented by Léo-Ernest Ouimet's Specialty Film Import.

In 1914, Canadian Animated Weekly by Universal Pictures became one of the first newsreels in Canada. Ouimet, who was a pioneer for Canadian newsreels, created Specialty Film Import in 1915, as a distributor, but his newsreel and distribution companies were sold in 1923, and he unsuccessfully worked in the United States in the 1920s. At the peak of Ouimet's career 1.5 million Canadians were watching his newsreels twice per week. Domestic newsreel companies were unsuccessful after branches of American companies, Fox Canadian News and Canadian Kinograms, were established.

Most sound films from Quebec in the 1910s and 1920s are lost. Yves Lever stated that Larente-Homier's 1922 film Madeleine de Verchères was the first truly Québécois fictional feature film. Larente-Homier's work was later destroyed by his son due to orders from the Fire Bureau as the film reels were flammable.

Ernest Shipman established multiple film companies in cities and would produce a limited number of films using local money before moving to another area. Unlike other Canadian filmmakers he sought financial support from the American market. In 1919, incorporated Canadian Photoplays with a financial capital of $250,000 in Alberta. He started production on Wapi, the Walrus, but retitled it to Back to God's Country to capitalize God's Country and the Woman, starring his wife Nell Shipman. The film was a critical and financial success, with it grossing over $500,000 in its first year, and Shipman's investors saw a 300% return on investment. Despite the success of the film Canadian Photoplays did not produce another film and went into voluntary liquidation. He signed a contract with Ralph Connor in 1919, and formed Dominion Films, based in New York, to produce films in Winnipeg. Winnipeg Productions was formed to adapt twelve of Connor's stories, but only five were filmed. Shipman created five companies across Canada in 1922, but only three produced films. He incorporated New Brunswick Films on 23 August 1922, but the failure of Blue Water ended Shipman's career.

Another important early effort in independent feature film production was undertaken by Vancouver cinematographer Arthur D. Kean, who spent almost four years producing and promoting his picture, Policing the Plains (1927). Based on a non-fiction book about the Royal North West Mounted Police by Roderick G. MacBeth, Kean's feature was intended to counteract the sensationalized image of the force as depicted in the Hollywood adventure potboilers of the period. Work commenced in 1924 under Kean's Western Pictures Company (which was unincorporated); in 1925 the project was reorganized under a new company, Policing the Plains Productions Ltd. Kean received extensive cooperation from the Royal Canadian Mounted Police over the long period of principal photography (March 1924–August 1927), but the production suffered numerous delays, as well as chronic financial and logistical problems. Policing the Plains premiered in Toronto in December 1927, but Kean was unable to secure further distribution and exhibition, and the film was shelved. The picture still existed in 1937, but eventually the negative and the sole print were lost or destroyed.

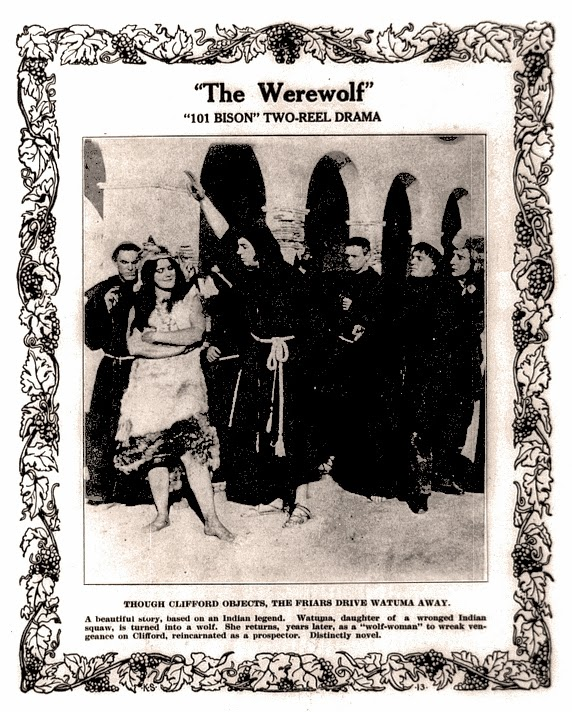
The Werewolf is regarded as the first horror film in Canadian history.

Trenton, Ontario, despite its small size, was a major film production area and had one of the few studios to last longer than a few years. Canadian National Features, founded by George Brownridge, construction a studio in the town and raised a financial capital of $500,000, with $278,000 coming within the first week, in 1916. However, the company suspended production after spending $43,000 on its first two films, The Marriage Trap and Power, and declared bankruptcy with $79,000 in assets. The studio in Trenton was taken over by the Pan American Film Corporation in 1918, but only released one film before closing. Brownridge founded Adanac Producing Company and released the two Canadian National Features films in 1918. Brownridge shifted production towards corporate sponsorships by displaying products in dramatized films. Brownridge sought a sponsorship from the CPR and John Murray Gibbon saw Power and asked Brownridge to make anti-Bolshevik films during the First Red Scare. Adanac was reorganized in 1919, with Brownridge as its managing director and Denis Tansey, a member of parliament, as its president. The Great Shadow was released in 1920, after being filmed in Canada rather than New York as Brownridge wanted to create a domestic film industry, and was a critical and financial success although the CPR pulled its public support before its release. However, the company went bankrupt with Brownridge blaming Harley Knoles's wastefulness and Selznick Pictures's distribution policy. Brownridge sold the Trenton studio to the Ontario Motion Picture Bureau in 1924, and it continued to be used, with Carry on, Sergeant! as the sole fictional work filmed there, until Mitchell Hepburn ordered its closure in 1934, and it was turned into a community centre.

Motion Skreenadz, incorporated in 1920, conducted the majority of film production in western Canada and brought colour film production to British Columbia. Leon C. Shelly gained control over Motion Skreenadz and Vancouver Motion Pictures from 1936 to 1937. He extended the company to Toronto in 1945, but relocated the company entirely to Toronto in 1946. The company was reorganized into Shelley Films, but production of non-newsreels was ended in favor of focusing on film laboratories.

British Columbia's government agencies used promotional films from 1908 to 1919, before the creation of the British Columbia Patriotic and Educational Picture Service. It was headed by A. R. Baker and mainly distributed films produced under contract by Arthur D. Kean. The provincial legislature passed legislation requiring the display of at least one ten-minute education film or travelogue during all of the programs. The Motion Picture Branch of the Bureau of Publications was created by Saskatchewan in 1924, to produce education films.

The Ontario Motion Picture Bureau was established in 1917, but did not produce its own films until 1923. S.C. Johnson, who worked in the Ontario Agriculture Department, was its first director. The victory of the United Farmers of Ontario in the 1919 election resulted in Peter Smith reorganized film production under the Amusement Branch with Otter Elliott heading it. He changed the focus of filmmaking from agricultural training towards quality productions. By 1925, the bureau had 2,000 films in its library, distributed 1,500 reels of film per month, and made one feature-length documentary, Cinderella of the Farms in 1931, but the bureau was dissolved after the Ontario Liberal Party won in the 1934 Ontario general election.

Albert Tessier and Maurice Proulx produced large amounts of films in French at a time when it was uncommon. Joseph Morin, the Quebec Minister of Agriculture, used film for education purposes and the Service de ciné-photographie was established in 1941.

The War Office Cinematographic Committee, one of the first times the national government was involved in filmmaking, was formed in 1916, and was led by Max Aitken, 1st Baron Beaverbrook. The committee contracted the Topical Film Company before buying a controlling share. The committee aided in the production of distribution of D. W. Griffith's Hearts of the World. The committee was dissolved after World War I and its shares in Topical Film Company were sold, which were donated to war charities.

The Associated Screen News of Canada was founded by Bernard Norrish in 1920, and the CPR held a majority control of its stock. The company grew from two employees in 1920, to over one hundred by 1930, and focused on the production of newsreels, theatrical shorts, and sponsored films. It was the largest Canadian film company until the growth of Crawley Films in the 1950s. It was one of Canada's longest lasting film production companies with Crawley Films and the National Film Board of Canada being one of the few to outlast it. Before ASN constructed a film laboratory all of the film print distributed in Canada were processed in the United States. The company was processing twenty-two million feet of film in per year by 1929. ASN constructed a sound stage in 1936, and produced House in Order, which was its only feature film in the 1930s.

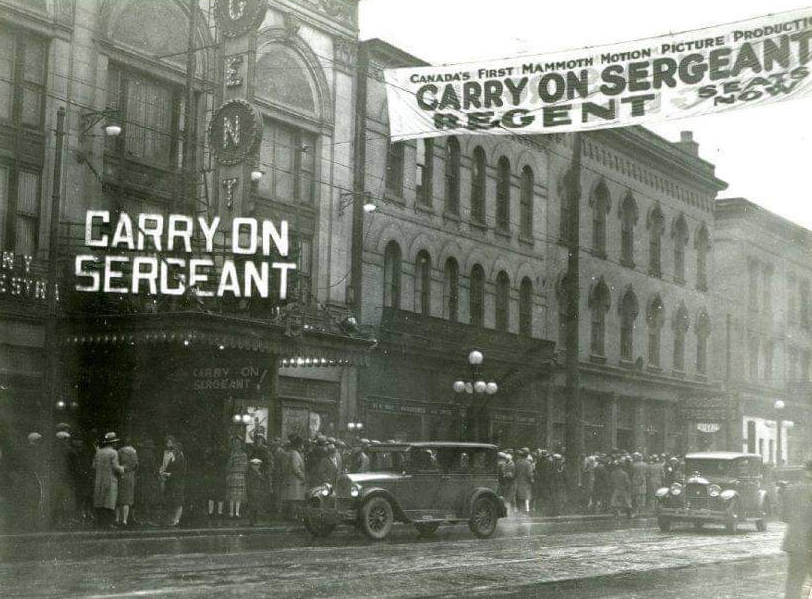
Carry on, Sergeant! was a major film production in the late 1920s. Its failure resulted in a decline of the Canadian film industry that it did not recover from until after World War II.

Brownridge was sent to New York in 1925 by the Ontario Motion Picture Bureau to gain a distribution contract, but only negotiated one with Cranfield and Clarke after a year of high expenses. Treasurer William Herbert Price criticized Brownridge stating that his "travelling expenses are very high and I do not see there was very much result from anything he has done". George Patton, the bureau's head, supported the deal as Cranfield and Clarke had no Jews in its company. W.F. Clarke, who was later blamed for the company's financial failure, pushed for Canadian film production and came up with an idea of a film about "a dramatic story written by an eminent authority around the part played by the Canadians in the World War". Clarke incorporated British Empire Films of Canada in June 1927. The film adaption of The Better 'Ole was released in Canada under the name Carry On! and was financially success. Clarke's film was named Carry on, Sergeant! to help raise funds. It received financial backing from influential people, including prime ministers Arthur Meighen and Bennett. The film started production, by the recently created subsidiary Canadian International Films, in 1926, and Bruce Bairnsfather was hired to direct with an expensive contract, but his inexperience with film led to production troubles that increased the cost of the budget. The production difficulties led to internal company problems and Clarke was removed as general manager although he remained vice-president.

The film was released in 1928, to mixed-to-negative reviews and was only distributed in Ontario before the company went bankrupt in 1929. Brownridge attempted to recut and release the film in 1930, stating that it "would gross at least $200,000", but it did not happen. The Ontario government was still interested in attempting to create a large film studio by 1932, along with Edward Wentworth Beatty and Herbert Samuel Holt, but the recent failure of Canadian International Films and Great Depression led to its not receiving investments. The Canadian film industry would not recover until after World War II.

==== National Film Board ====
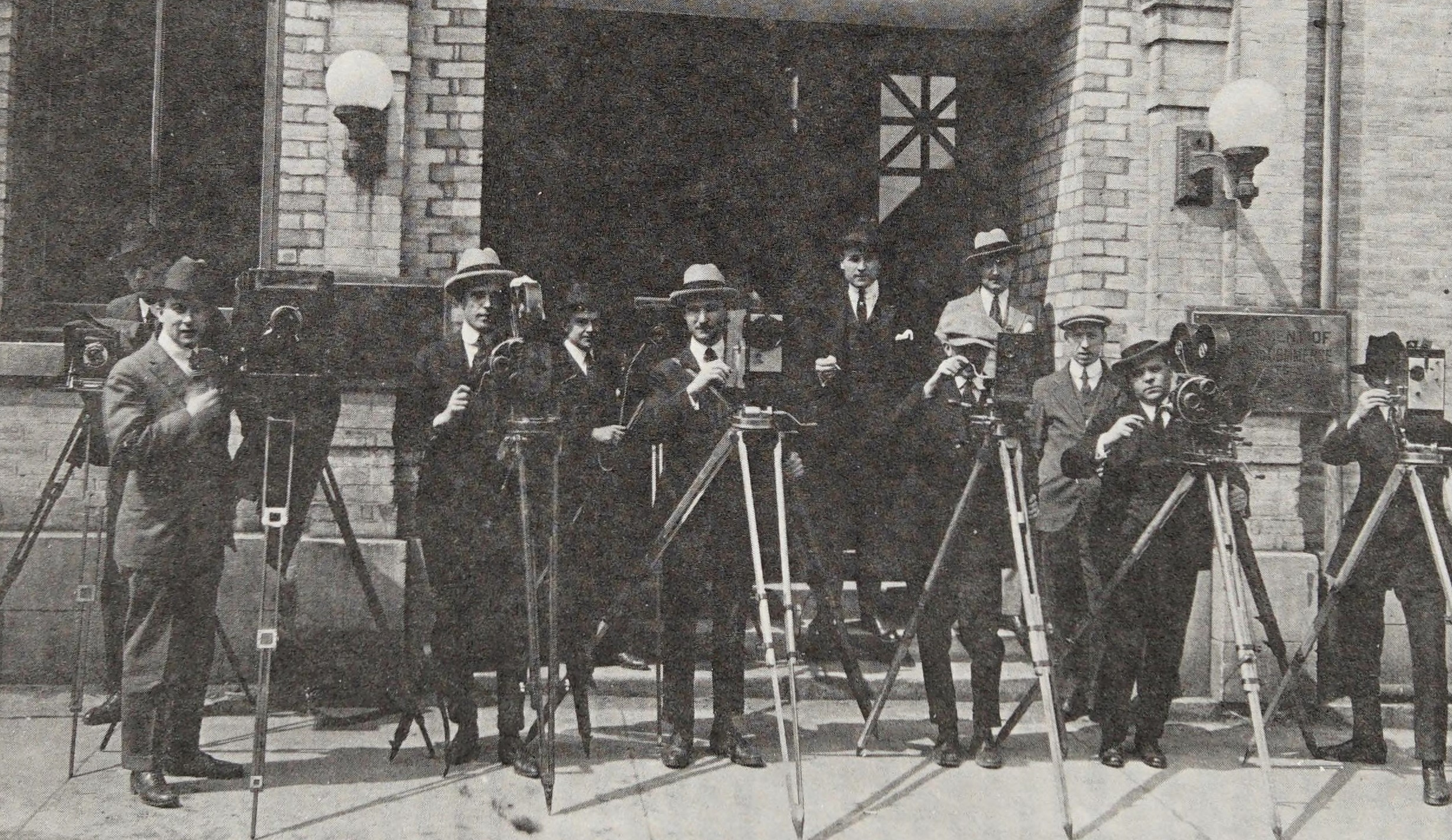
A group of cameramen who worked for the Canadian Government Motion Picture Bureau in 1925. Frank Badgley, the bureau's director from 1927 to 1941, is in the background.

The Exhibits and Publicity Bureau was founded on 19 September 1918, and was reorganized into the Canadian Government Motion Picture Bureau on 1 April 1923. Its films were theatrically released in the United States by Bray Productions. The organization's budget stagnated and declined during the Great Depression. The organization was led by Bernard Norrish from 1917 to 1920, Raymond Peck from 1920 to 1927, and Frank Badgley from 1927 to 1941. Badgley stated that the bureau needed to transition to sound films or else it would lose its access to theatrical releases, but the organization did not gain the equipment until 1934, and by then it had lost its theatrical distributors. Badgley was able to get a 16 mm film facility for the bureau in 1931. The organization's budget fell from $75,000 in 1930, to $65,000 in 1931, and $45,000 in 1932. However, its budget was increased to $70,000 in 1933. The bureau was reorganized into the National Film Board of Canada in 1941, following John Grierson's recommendation.

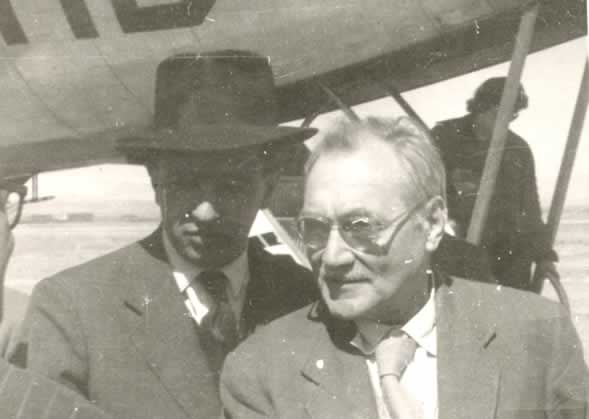
John Grierson was the first commissioner of the National Film Board of Canada.

Ross McLean was working as the secretary to High Commissioner Vincent Massey when he met Grierson, and asked for Grierson to come to Canada to aide in the governmental film policy. Grierson made a report on the Canadian film industry in 1938, and the National Film Act, which he drafted, was passed in 1939 causing the creation of the NFB. Grierson became the first Film Commissioner of the NFB and served until the end of World War II. Employment rose from fifty to over seven hundred from 1941 to 1945, although it was cut by 40% after the war ended. Grierson selected McLean to work as assistant commissioner and Stuart Legg to oversee the productions.

Lest We Forget, Canada's first feature-length war documentary with sound, was released in 1935. Grierson made efforts to increase the theatrical distribution of NFB films, primarily its war-related films, as he was coordinating wartime information for the United Kingdom in North America. Famous Players aided in distribution and the Canadian Motion Picture War Services Committee, which worked with the War Activities Committee of the Motion Pictures Industry, was founded in 1940. NFB productions such as The World in Action was watched by 30-40 million people per month in the United Kingdom and United States in 1943, and Canada Carries On was watched by 2.25 million people by 1944. The audience for NFB newsreels reached 40-50 million per week by 1944.

Grierson opposed feature film production as he believed that Canada did not have a large enough market for an independent feature film industry. He supported working with American film companies and stated that "the theatre film business is an international business, dependent when it comes to distribution on an alliance or understanding with American film interests". He travelled to Hollywood in 1944, and the NFB sent scripts to American companies for consideration.

Grierson lacked strong support in the Canadian government and some of his films received opposition from members of the government. Inside Fighting Russia was criticized for its support of the Russian Revolution and Balkan Powderkeg for criticizing the United Kingdom's policy in the Balkans. Grierson and the NFB were attacked during the onset of the Cold War. The Federal Bureau of Investigation created a file on Grierson in 1942, due to the World in Action newsreel being considered too left-wing. Leo Dolan, an ally of Hepburn and the head of the Canadian Government Travel Bureau, accused Grierson of being Jewish and a Co-operative Commonwealth Federation supporter. The Gouzenko Affair implicated Freda Linton, one of Grierson's secretaries, and the organization was criticized by the Progressive Conservative Party for subversive tendencies, financial waste, and being a monopoly. Grierson was also accused of being involved, but was proven not to be although he resigned as commissioner in 1945.

McLean was ordered to assist the Royal Canadian Mounted Police screen NFB employees and the RCMP requested him to fire a list of employees. McLean, who refused to fire any employees without their disloyalty being proven, was not reappointed as commissioner and replaced by William Arthur Irwin in 1950. Irwin also refused to fire employees without proven disloyalty and reduced the demand and only three of the thirty-six requested were fired.

The Royal Commission on National Development in the Arts, Letters and Sciences, with Massey as its chair, was formed in 1949. The NFB submitted a brief asking to have a headquarters constructed, budget increases, and to become a Crown corporation. Robert Winters, whose ministry oversaw the NFB, stated that its brief did not represent government policy. The Association of Motion Picture Producers and Laboratories of Canada submitted a brief criticizing a government monopoly, with the NFB's crown corporation request being referred to as an "expansionist, monopolistic psychology", and that they were unable to compete with the NFB as it paid no taxes and was exempt from tariffs. The commission's report supported the NFB and its requests for Crown corporation status and a headquarters were accepted.

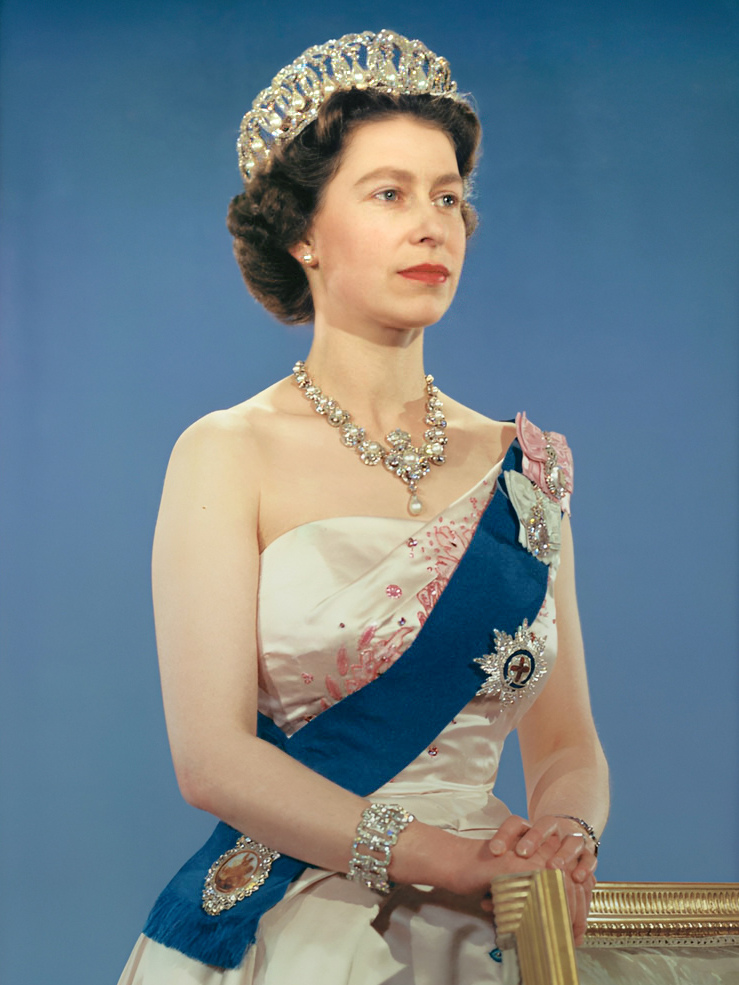
The financial success of Royal Journey, depicting Princess Elizabeth and Prince Philip's tour of Canada, aided the NFB and was one of the reasons that John Grierson said that William Arthur Irwin "saved the Film Board".

A Canadian tour by Princess Elizabeth and Prince Philip was filmed and was initially meant to be two reels, worth twenty minutes, but grew to five reels as they could not determine what to cut. Irwin met with Harvey Harnick, the NFB's Columbia theatrical distributor, and J.J. Fitzgibbons, the president of Famous Players, and Fitzgibbons told Irwin that he would screen all five reels if the film was completed for a Christmas release. Royal Journey opened in seventeen first-run theatres and over course of the next two years it was screened in 1,249 Canadian theatres where it was watched by a record two million people and the film was also screened in forty other countries. The film cost $88,000, but the NFB gained a profit of $150,000 and the film's success was one of the reasons Grierson stated that Irwin "saved the Film Board". It was seen by over two million people within two months.

The Canadian Government Motion Picture Bureau and Associated Screen News of Canada had no French-Canadian employees. Vincent Paquette became the NFB's first French-Canadian filmmaker in 1941, and directed La Cité de Notre-Dame, the board's first in-house French-language film, in 1942. The number of French-Canadian employees grew to seventeen by 1945, and a quarter of the board's budget was spent on French productions. The Massey Commission and Gratien Gélinas, a member of the NFB's Board of Governors, called for an improvement in French-language productions, but Premier Maurice Duplessis opposed it. In 1963, The Hour of Independence (À l'heure de la décolonisation), directed by Monique Fortier, was the first NFB film directed by a French Canadian woman.

French-language media, including Le Devoir, criticized the NFB after it removed Roger Blais in 1957. NFB francophone directors Denys Arcand, Gilles Carle, Jacques Godbout, Gilles Groulx, and Clément Perron criticized the organization for its censorship policies, refusal to produce feature films, and its colonial treatment of Quebec. Michel Brault, Carle, Bernard Gosselin, Groulx, and Arthur Lamothe left following reprimands. Guy Roberge became the first French-Canadian to serve as the NFB's commissioner. Duplessis died in 1959, and Quebec Liberal Party gained control while the Liberal Party won in the 1963 Canadian federal election. The Liberals supported a policy of bilingualism and biculturalism. A French-language branch of the NFB that was independent of its English-language productions was formed in 1964, under the leadership of Pierre Juneau.

Drylanders, the organization's first English language feature-length fiction film, was released in 1963.

Kathleen Shannon organized Studio D, the first publicly funded feminist film-production unit in the world, in 1974, and produced 125 films before its closure in 1996. However, there would be no French version of Studio D until the formation of Studio B in 1986. The studio produced three Oscar winning films by 1984 (I'll Find a Way, If You Love This Planet, and Flamenco at 5:15).

==== Governmental financial involvement ====
Starting in 1954, the Capital Cost Allowance was able to be used for a 60% tax write-off for film investment and the amount was increased to 100% in 1974. $1.2 billion was invested in Canadian film and television in the thirteen years following the increase. The average film budget rose from $527,000 to $2.6 million in 1979, and $3.5 million in 1986. From 1958 to 1967, private film investment accounted for 18% of film investments and it declined to 13.5% in 1968, while the CFDC accounted for 37.5%. Following the tax write-off increase private investment rose to account for 47% of film investment between 1975 and 1978 while the CFDC declined to 15%. Silence of the North was the first film with American backing to receive CCA certification. The Film and Video Production Tax Credit replaced the Capital Cost Allowance in 1995.

In 1962, Roberge proposed the creation of an organization to aid in film finance based on the National Film Finance Corporation and Centre national du cinéma et de l'image animée.

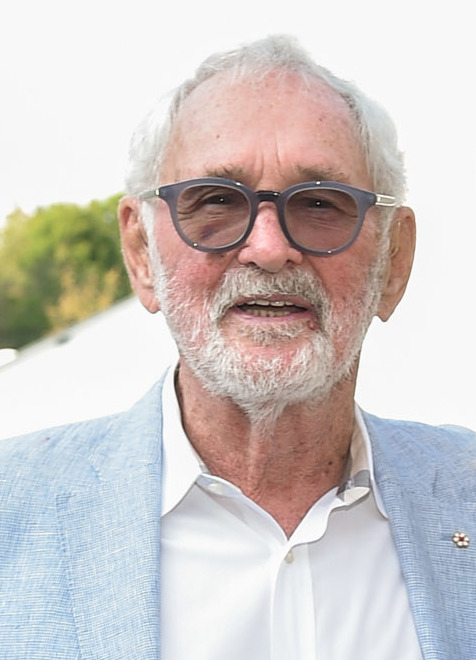
Norman Jewison founded the Canadian Film Centre

The Interdepartmental Committee on the Possible Development of a Feature Film Industry in Canada, under the leadership of NFB commissioner Roberge, was formed by the secretary of state. The committee submitted a report to the 19th Canadian Ministry for the creation of a loan fund to aid the development of the Canadian film industry. The proposal was approved in October 1965, and legislation, the Canadian Film Development Corporation Act of 1966–67, for its creation was introduced in June 1966, before being approved on 3 March 1967. The Canadian Film Development Corporation was established with a budget of $10 million in 1967. In February 1968, Spender was appointed as its director along with a five-member board. Canada lack of a film school leading to the creation of the Canadian Film Centre by Norman Jewison. The CFDC started investing up to 50% of its budget into films that cost less than $500,000.

Explosion was the first film to receive financial support from the CFDC. Valérie by Denis Héroux, which was not financially supported by the CFDC, was made at cost of $70,000 and made over $1 million in Quebec. The CFDC financially supported Héroux's other films Here and Now (L'Initiation), Love in a Four Letter World, Virgin Lovers, and Two Women in Gold (Deux Femmes en or). Deux Femmes en or was financially successful, with its two million ticket sales remaining the highest in Canadian history, and became the highest grossing Canadian film.

The $10 million budget was used by October 1971, after the CFDC invested $6.7 million into 64 films with an average cost of $250,000 per film. The CFDC was not financially successful as only three of those films made a profit and the organization recovered $600,000 of its investments. After 1970 the CFDC focused on investing in smaller budgeted films and ended its work with American theatrical distributors to them hiding profits. Another $10 million budget was given to the CFDC in November 1971, and a new investment strategy in which $600,000 per year would be invested into productions, with its creative and technical crew being Canadian, budgeted below $100,000, and $3 million per year on films with guaranteed distribution. It took the CFDC five years to recover its first $1 million investment, but recovered $1 million in 1977 alone. From 1977 to 1978, the CFDC invested $1.6 million into twenty films and its investments rose to $10.8 million into 34 films from 1979 to 1980. Between 1968 and 1978, the organization funded 103 English-language films, but only Black Christmas, Death Weekend, Heart Farm, Shivers, and The Apprenticeship of Duddy Kravitz were profitable to the CFDC.

The Toronto Filmmakers' Coop, an organization with 150 filmmakers, sent a letter with the endorsement of 200 filmmakers to Gérard Pelletier asking for the creation of a content quota that required distributors to have 15% of their films be Canadian. Pelletier announced the creation of a theatre in the National Capital Region that exclusively showed Canadian films in 1972. A study published by the Secretary of State reported that a content quota would not work as a 50% quote would generate less revenue than a 5% sales increase for foreign films. The study stated that new tax regulations and investments by the CFDC could make the Canadian film industry internationally competitive.

The budget for the CFDC was limited to a few million and its budget from 1982 to 1983 was $4.5 million. However, the organization had its role expanded to include television in 1983, and administered the Canadian Broadcast Program Development Fund. The television fund was initially given an annual budget of $60 million. An annual budget of $30 million through the Feature Film Fund was created in 1986, and an annual budget of $17 million through the Feature Film Distribution Fund was created in 1988. The organization's combined budget grew to $146 million by 1989.

A report was written by a task force in 1985, and it stated that foreign domination of film and video distribution, chronic undercapitalization of production companies, and concentration of theatre ownership and distribution and exhibition vertical integration hurt the development of the film industry. They recommended legislation to increase the control of Canadian-owned companies over distribution and Minister of Communications Flora MacDonald proposed a film licensing system based on their recommendations. American distributors opposed the policy and lobbied the American government through the MPAA and its president, Jack Valenti. Valenti met with President Ronald Reagan at least twice and Reagan criticized the legislation of a US-Canadian economic summit. 54 members of the United States Congress signed a letter to Prime Minister Brian Mulroney opposing the legislation. The legislation was not tabled and it failed.

==== Post-Carry on, Sergeant! ====
F. R. Crawley, who was involved in filmmaking for a decade, and Judith Crawley created Île d'Orléans in 1938, and its success led to a $3,000 loan from F. R. Crawley's father that created Crawley Films. It employment rose from 6 in 1946, 33 in 1949, and around 100 by the 1950s. One-sixth of the $3 million worth of films produced by the Canadian film industry in 1952 came from Crawley Films.

France Film and other companies started creating French film productions in the 1930s. Maria Chapdelaine is commonly, although incorrectly, regarded as the first French-Canadian sound movie. The first dramatic feature film in Canada shot in colour, Here Will I Nest, and the first French-language one, The Immortal Scoundrel, were made by Melburn Turner. Joseph-Alexandre DeSève monopolized the distribution of French-language films through France-Film. France-Film arose from the distribution of Maria Chapdelaine which sold 70,000 tickets in Canada. He also aided in the production of Notre-Dame de la Mouise in response to the papal encyclical Vigilanti Cura. DeSève purchased Renaissance Films following the success of The Music Master. DeSève produced four films through Renaissance Films Distribution. Paul L'Anglais formed Quebec Productions filmed Whispering City in English and French, under the title La Forteresse. It was seen by over 100,000 people in Quebec over the course of six weeks.

The papal encyclical Vigilanti Cura in 1936, changed the Catholic attitude towards movies and the church became a part of Quebec movie production in the 1940s. Most of the nineteen movies, fifteen in French and four in English, produced in Quebec from 1944 to 1953 were made by Renaissance Films or Quebec Productions. Those were the only French-language feature films produced in Canada in that period.

Bush Pilot was the only English-language feature film created by a Canadian company in the 1940s.

==== Modern industry ====
Domestic theatrical film production
Year	Films produced	Spending	Box office
2011-2012	114	$340 million	$27 million
2012-2013	128	$379 million	$24 million
2013-2014	117	$352 million	$28 million
2014-2015	131	$378 million	$19 million
2015-2016	122	$267 million	$18 million
2016-2017	123	$291 million	$32 million
2017-2018	122	$273 million	$20 million
2018-2019	139	$321 million	$17 million
2019-2020	126	$290 million	$8 million
2020-2021	75	$268 million	$18 million

Pour la suite du monde was the first Canadian film shown in competition at the Cannes Film Festival.

Canadians had to import colour 35 mm film until 1967, as Canada did not produce any internally.

By the 1960s Nat Taylor, a theatre owner, controlled the largest private film studio in Canada, Toronto International Film Studios, two distribution companies, International Film Distributors and Allied Artists Pictures, a television station, CJOH-DT, and multiple production companies. He entered film production with The Mask in 1961. Taylor, unlike other members of the AMPPLC, supported state involvement in feature film production.

Bryant Fryer founded one of the first animation companies in Canada and made six silhouette films from 1927 to 1935. Norman McLaren was brought to Canada from Scotland by Grierson in 1941. McLaren recruited English-Canadian animators from OCAD University, including George Dunning, Evelyn Lambart, Grant Munro, and Robert Verrall. McLaren recruited French-Canadian animators from École des beaux-arts de Montréal, including René Jodoin. Jodoin created a French animation unit in 1966, which included Laurent Coderre and Bernard Longpré. Le village enchanté was the first recorded animated feature film in Canadian history and Return to Oz which was based on Tales of the Wizard of Oz, the first recorded Canadian animated television series, was the second recorded animated feature film.

In the 1960s filmmakers came from universities throughout Canada. David Cronenberg, Clarke Mackey, and David Secter graduated from the University of Toronto. John Hofsess, Ivan Reitman, and Peter Rowe graduated from McMaster University. Jack Darcus and Larry Kent graduated from the University of British Columbia. Cronenberg received financial support from the CFDC and Shivers was their most successful investment, with a budget of $150,000 ($75,000 from the CFDC) and gross of $5 million. 708 feature films, over twice the amount made in the past fifty years, were made during the 1970s.

Carle, Groulx, Claude Jutra, and Jean Pierre Lefebvre, who were inspired by the French New Wave, made their directorial debuts from 1963 to 1965, and all won the Grand Prix at the Montreal International Film Festival throughout the 1960s. Jean-Claude Lauzon's Night Zoo won the most Genie Awards in history, with thirteen awards.

Dream Life by Mireille Dansereau was the first privately produced feature film in Canada to be directed by a woman.

Porky's became the first Canadian film to gross more than $100 million. The Decline of the American Empire was the most successful Quebec film released in France with 1,236,322 viewers. The Care Bears Movie, by Nelvana, was the highest-grossing non-Disney animated film at the time of its release. Six of the ten highest-grossing films in Canada between 1991 and 2001 were made in Quebec.

Film investment in British Columbia rose from $188.5 million in 1990 to over $1 billion in 1999. Feature film production rose from 16 films to 56 films, with the total number of productions rising from 50 to 192. From 2011 to 2021, film and television production British Columbia replaced Ontario as having the highest amount of spending. Spending rose from $1,578,000 to $3,254,000 in British Columbia, while Ontario rose from $2,586,000 to $3,166,000, and Quebec rose from $1,316,000 to $2,098,000.

Women accounted for 17% of directors, 22% of writers, and 12% of cinematographers for projects backed by Telefilm between 2013 and 2014. In 2016, programs were instituted at Telefilm to increase the number of projects led by women. The percentage of films supported by Telefilm that were directed or written by women rose to 44% and 46% by 2017.

In 2023, the total production volume of film and television production in Canada fell to below the numbers during the COVID-19 pandemic due to the SAG-AFTRA and Writers Guild of America strikes.

Quebec amended its film tax credit laws in 2024, in which a cap of 65% of a contract's value was implemented. Visual effects and animation employees protested the change, but François Legault's government stated that it was necessary to reduce costs due to the tax credit investment rising from $226 million in 2018, to $440 million in 2024.

=== Theatres ===
In the 1890s and 1900s films were shown by travelling showmen. John C. Green, a magician who presented for the Holland brothers at their first showing, travelled throughout eastern Canada and New England until the establishment of movie theatres. John Albert Schuberg was credited with bringing movies to Vancouver and Winnipeg, and the provinces of British Columbia and the Canadian Prairies. Schuberg established Canada's first permanent movie theatre, the Electric Theatre, in Vancouver, in October 1902, with its first movie played being The Eruption of Mount Pelee. He opened additional theatres in Winnipeg, and later gained the license for First National Pictures in western Canada. He had one of the largest theatre chains and sold it to Jay and Jules Allen for around $1 million in 1919, before returning in 1921, and then selling it to Famous Players in 1924.

Jay and Jules Allen established their first theatre in Brantford in 1906. The established Allen Amusement Corporation, a film exchange, in 1908. Their chain was worth over $20 million by 1920, and had fifty-three theatres by 1923, when they declared bankruptcy and it was acquired by Famous Players. The Allens owned the distribution rights for Pathé and Paramount Pictures. In 1916, they rejected an offer by Paramount president Adolph Zukor to create an equal partnership. The Allens informed Nathan Nathanson of this attempt and Nathanson convinced Zukor to give him their distribution rights in 1920, for twenty years after creating his own theatre chain.

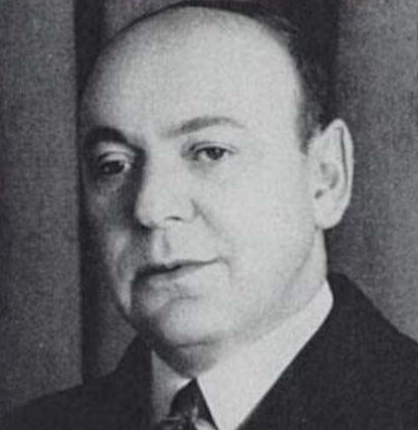
Nathan Nathanson founded Famous Players and Odeon Theatres. These companies controlled the theatre industry in Canada.

Nathanson's Famous Players started an expansion campaign in the 1920s that led to its gaining control of all first run theatres in the major cities. Zukor and Paramount forced Nathanson out of Famous Players after buying a large amount of the stock in 1930. Famous Players also controlled the distribution industry in Canada, accounting for at least 40% of distribution, due to its connections to Paramount Pictures. Paul Nathanson managed Regal Films, which was controlled by Paramount, and distributed films from British International Pictures, Metro-Goldwyn-Mayer, and Pathé, and Famous Players also distributed films from Columbia Pictures. Fox Film, RKO Pictures, Tiffany Pictures, and Warner Bros. were the other main distributors in Canada in the 1930s. A study conducted by United Artists in 1931 showed that 67% of rental revenue in Canada came from nineteen theatres in Canada's main cities while the remainder came from the rest.

Block booking by major studios, that were from outside Canada, prevented independent theatre owners from obtaining films at a reasonable price. R. B. Bennett, who invested into the film industry, made investigating the film industry an issue in the 1930 election. Peter White was appointed to investigate Famous Players' monopolistic control of theatres under the Combines Investigation Act. White concluded that "a combine exists and has existed at least since the year of 1926" and Famous Players was detrimental to the public interest in 1931, but no action was taken against the company. Bennett supported taking action and the attorneys general of Alberta, British Columbia, Ontario, and Saskatchewan would prosecute Famous Players. Fifteen companies and three people, including Nathan Nathanson, were charged, but the Supreme Court of Canada ruled in favor of the companies.

After losing control over Famous Players Nathanson created Odeon Theatres in April 1941, and resigned from his position at Famous Players in May. He built the company using Regal Films, which was managed by his brother and distributed MGM films, and gaining the business of companies whose contracts with Famous Players were expiring. Odeon did not gain a MGM distribution contract, but did gain ones for all of Columbia Pictures' films, two-thirds of Universal's films, and one-third of Fox's films. Nathanson died in 1943, and was succeeded by his son Paul. Films released in Famous Players and Odeon theatres, both foreign owned after Paul sold his stock to J. Arthur Rank in 1946, accounted for over 60% of the Canadian box office by 1947.

Taylor, who declined to become the general manager of Odeon in 1941, founded Twentieth Century Theatres in the 1930s and the Famous Players-aligned company grew to own sixty-five theatres by the 1960s. He opened the International Theatre in Toronto which was the first theatre in Canada dedicated towards screening art films. Taylor and Garth Drabinsky created the Cineplex Odeon Corporation in 1979, and by 1987 it was the largest theatre chain in North America with 1,500 theatres, with two-thirds of them in the United States.

The deaths of seventy-eight children from the Laurier Palace Theatre fire in 1927, and opposition to film from the Catholic Church led to a ban on minors attending movie theatres until 1961. In the 1930s Quebec was the only province that allowed for theatres to be open on Sundays. The Quebec Cinema Act, passed in 1983, required that English-language films in Quebec must be translated into French within sixty days. However, films from the United States were unaffected as their distribution ended before the deadline and the NFB was exempted from the requirements.

The Canadian box office increased following World War II. In 1934 there were 796 theatres which admitted 107 million people to earn $25 million, and that grew to 1,229 theatres admitting 151 million people to make $37 million in 1940. By 1950 the number of theatres increased to 2,360, earning $86 million with 245 million people attending. However, during the 1950s Canadian film attendance declined, with the nation falling from the fifth-highest in film attendance to twenty-fifth by the 1960s, and the number of films the average Canadian saw per year dropped from seventeen in 1950 to eight in 1960. Ticket sales in Quebec fell from 60 million in 1952 to 19 million in 1969. The number of theatres in Canada declined from 1,635 in 1962 to 1,400 in 1967, then to 1,116 in 1974, and to 899 in 1984.

=== International ===
Many native-born Canadians, such as Al Christie, Allan Dwan, Louis B. Mayer, Sidney Olcott, Mack Sennett, and Jack L. Warner, aided in the creation and development of the American film industry.

In the early 1900s Canada was used as a shooting location for dramatic productions, with Hiawatha, the Messiah of the Ojibway being one of the first in 1903. The Kalem Company was one of the first American companies to conduct location shooting in Canada in 1909. Two of the films D. W. Griffith made in his first year as a director, The Ingrate and A Woman's Way, were made in Canada. British American Film Company, Canadian Bioscope Company, Conness Till Film Company of Toronto, and the All-Red Feature Company, the four Canadians companies that produced fictional films prior to World War I, had their investment come from Americans, but all of them were financially unsuccessful and closed within a few years, with Conness Till suffering a fire that destroyed their $50,000 studio.

Canadians were hostile to American filmmakers, and provincial film review boards instituted censorship policies in 1915, which included a ban on the gratuitous display of the flag of the United States. Fifty reels of film were banned in British Columbia in 1914 due to "an unnecessary display of U.S. flags", which put it as the third most common reason behind infidelity and seduction. In 1927, the United Kingdom created a quota limiting the number of foreign films that could be shown in the country, but productions that were produced within the British Empire and mostly made by British subjects were excluded from the quotas. American financers produced low-budget B movies within Canada to exploit the loophole before the legislation was changed in 1938 to exclude the Dominion. Nanook of the North and The Viking exploited the loophole. From 1928 to 1938 twenty-two feature films, the majority of Canada's film production, meant solely for the British market, were filmed.

American companies made $17 million in profits from Canada in 1947. Prime Minister William Lyon Mackenzie King's government sought to reduce the general trade imbalance between Canada and the United States. McLean called for the reinvestment of this money into Canadian film production and requiring the American distribution of Canadian shorts. The Motion Picture Association of America proposed the Canadian Cooperation Project and it was accepted by the Canadian government on 14 January 1948. The government would not restrict revenue to American companies in exchange for productions being filmed in Canada and mentions of Canada in those scripts to promote tourism. The project was considered unsuccessful and stifled Canadian filmmaking, with only eight Canadian feature films being made during the CCP's existence, before it ended in 1958. McLean was critical of the agreement as there was a lack of Canadian films distributed in the United States. Michael Spencer stated that the agreement was "allowed to die of embarrassment".

Gilbert Agar attended the Fourth National Motion Picture Conference of the Motion Picture Council in America in 1926, and reported that 95% of films released in Canada were from the United States. Eric Johnston stated that "outside the U.S. itself, Canada ranks as the second largest market in the world for Hollywood films." The number of films in Canada of American origin declined to 68% by 1954, and 41% in 1962.

Canadian directors, such as Norman Jewison, left Canada to work in the United States. Raoul Barré worked as a cartoonist in Canada before moving to the United States and working as an animator at Barré Studio. Stephen Bosustow and other animators left Walt Disney Animation Studios during the Disney animators' strike and founded United Productions of America.

Seven Arts Productions, while being listed on the Toronto Stock Exchange and having a majority of its investors be Canadians, had the majority of its productions done by its American subsidiary. It spent $25 million on ten American film productions, including Dr. Strangelove and What Ever Happened to Baby Jane?. Canadian 3D animation companies, such as Softimage and Alias Research, had their software used for American films, such as Jurassic Park.

== Reception ==
Productions from the NFB received 64 Academy Award nominations and ten victories by 2000. The Crawleys produced 2,500 films and won over 200 awards during their careers, including the Academy Award for Best Documentary Feature Film for The Man Who Skied Down Everest.

Churchill's Island, If You Love This Planet, and Neighbours were awarded the Academy Award for Best Documentary Short Film. The Sand Castle, Special Delivery, and Every Child were awarded the Academy Award for Best Animated Short Film. I'll Find a Way was awarded the Academy Award for Best Live Action Short Film.

David Bairstow's Royal Journey won the BAFTA Award for Best Documentary in 1952.

Colin Low's The Romance of Transportation in Canada was awarded the Prix du Film d'Animation at the Cannes Film Festival in 1953. Brault won the Cannes Film Festival Award for Best Director for Orders.

== Censorship and preservation ==
=== Censorship ===
In 1906, Paul Bruchési voiced opposition to showing films on Sunday, as they were a commercial activity in violation of the Sabbath. Montreal banned Sunday screenings in 1908, but film companies successfully sued against the law.

Ouimet's fine of $10 in February 1908, for having the Ouimetoscope open on Sundays was a test case to establish the power to close places of amusement on Sundays. In 1920, Pierre-François Casgrain opposed an attempt to remove a 15¢ per reel per day tax on film exhibitors, stating that "Pictures that are shown are an invitation to the people of the poorer classes to revolt, and they bring disorder into the country". Fees implemented by the censorship boards earned the government large amounts of money with Alberta's two censorship boards making $12,275 in 1927. By 1921, New Brunswick had the lowest fee at $0.50 per reel while Ontario had the highest at $3 per reel, $1 per reel license for each copy. Appeals cost $5 in Quebec and $10 in Ontario. Variety reported in 1950 that censorship fees were costing the film industry over $1,450,000 per year, with $600,000 of the expense coming from Canada.

Censorship boards were established in Manitoba, Ontario, and Quebec in 1911, in Alberta and British Columbia in 1913, and in Nova Scotia in 1915. 5,500 reels of film were censored in the United Kingdom in 1925, compared to 6,639 reels in Quebec, 5,518 reels in Manitoba, and 5,013 reels in Alberta. Maclean's reported that the number of films banned in Canada fell from one hundred one in 1932 to nineteen in 1940, with nine being banned in Quebec and none in Ontario. Three hundred of the six hundred films examined by censors in 1940 were censored. Quebec censors rejected all films the dealt with divorce. Multiple Russian films were banned due to "suspected Communist propaganda", and during World War II all foreign films, with the exception of France, were banned.

Ontario banned all war films in 1914. The Canadian Militia initially ordered censorship boards in every province to condemn war films, but later created its own war films by 1915. In 1950, All Quiet on the Western Front was banned in Nova Scotia as there was a military recruitment drive happening.

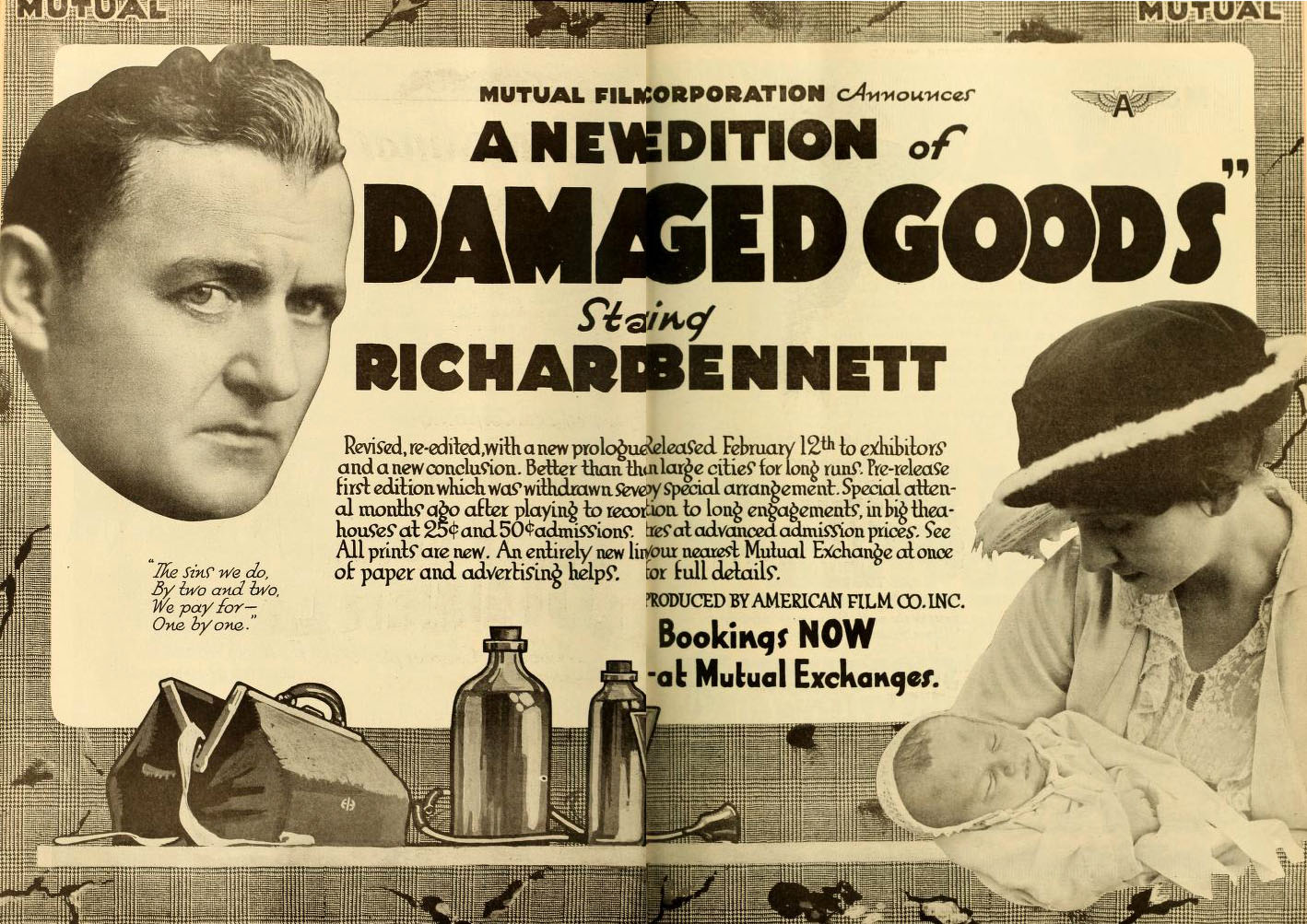
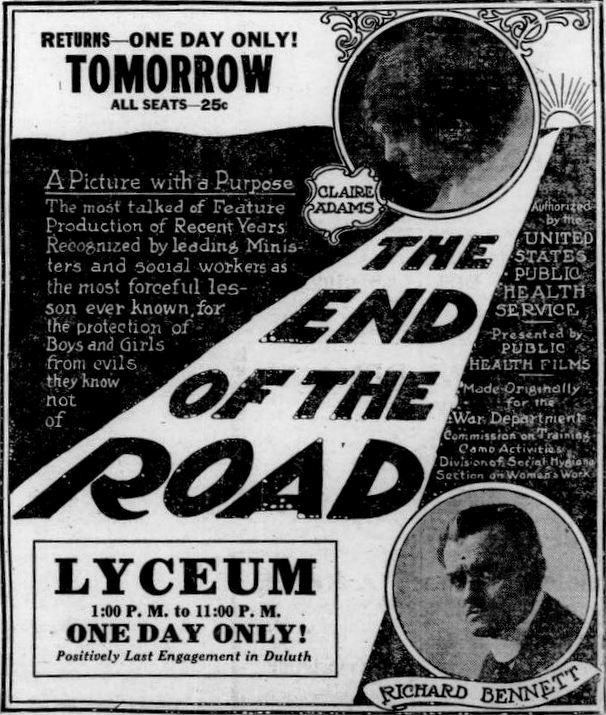
Damaged Goods, a film about sexually transmitted infection, was banned, but censorship policies changed after a government campaign was launched to reduce sexually transmitted diseases. The End of the Road was initially banned, but it and similar movies were later allowed.

Damaged Goods, a film about sexually transmitted infection, was banned in Ontario in 1916. Mutual Film screened the film to a selected audience—as a private showing it was exempt from the provincial censorship laws—and asked them if the film should be released. The audience approved of the film, and Mutual Film appealed the ruling, but were unsuccessful. To combat the spread of sexual diseases a government campaign was initiated in the late 1910s. The Canadian National Council for Combating Venereal Disease, which was led by William Renwick Riddell and Gordon Bates, sought to distribute The End of the Road in Ontario in 1919. The censorship board was conflicted over maintaining its earlier ruling or allowing a government campaign to continue. The board rejected the film, and the ruling was maintained on appeal. However, the ruling was reversed in 1920, and over 20,000 people saw the film within five days of its release and 40,000 by 1932. Other films about sexual diseases were allowed to be shown as well.

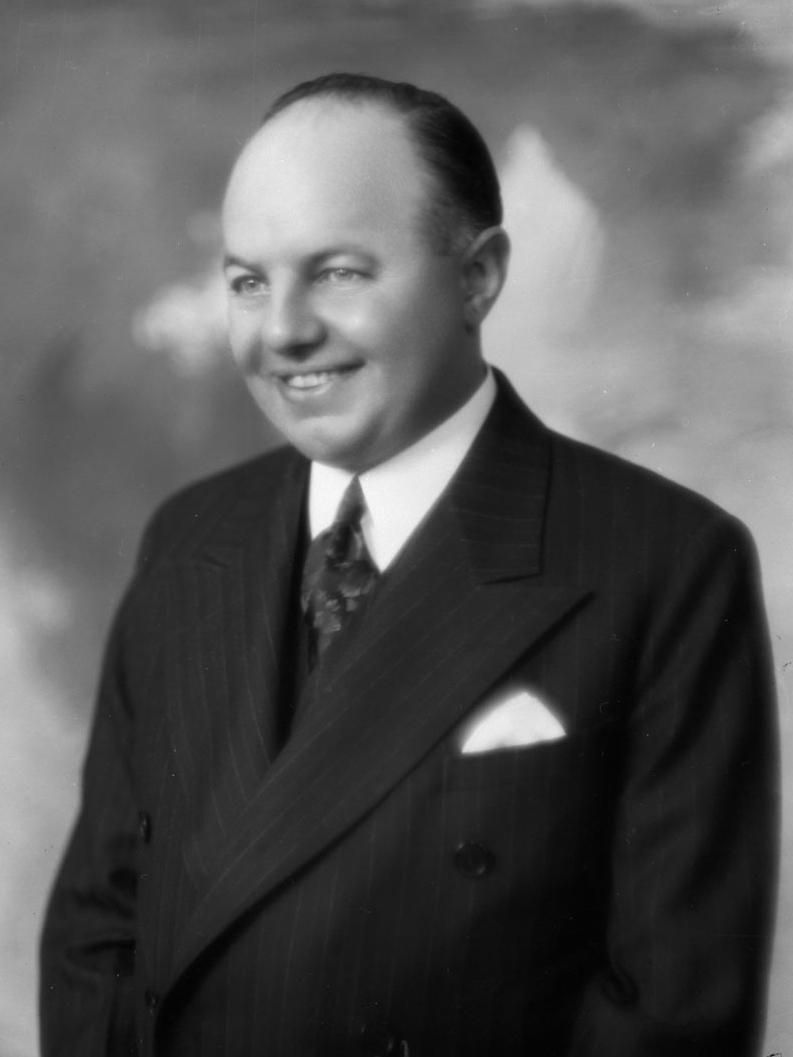
Minister of Finance Mitchell Hepburn banned The March of Time due to a Time article about him that he did not like.

Censors were criticized starting in the 1950s for their abuse of power. Minister of Finance Hepburn banned all of The March of Time newsreels in 1942, without the board watching it, due to a Time article about him that he did not like. J. Bernard Hughes, the chief censor in British Columbia, banned Diary of a Nazi stating that it was "purely Russian propaganda" that depicted "the Nazis at their worst". Ernest Manning believed that the film industry in the United States was dominated by communists and sought to ban multiple films including Frank Sinatra's The House I Live In. Duplessis banned showing NFB films in Quebec schools in 1952. The advent of television made it difficult for censors, as they could not control the content being broadcast to Canada from the United States and had limited control over internal television broadcasts, with the Canadian Broadcasting Corporation showing films that were banned in provinces in those provinces. Henry McLeod, a censor from Nova Scotia, stated that "What's the point of banning a film when the trade can turn around and sell it to the CBC?".

The Canadian Federation of Film Societies, an organization with 25,000 members, called for the replacement of censorship boards with a rating system. In 1961, George Enos, who served as New Brunswick's censor for thirty years, stated that censorship "is very undesirable" and that "Ninety percent of the worry is needless. Respectable people will condemn a bad picture. I don't like the idea of setting up one man to say what his neighbour shall see or not see. He would have to be a superman." By the 1960s the Quebec censorship board was one of the largest with eighteen full-time staff employed compared to other provincial boards which had two to five full-time staff. By the 1970s the censorship boards were being transitioned to classification boards, with the companies having to recut their films rather than the boards.

The Hicklin test was used as the standard for film censorship until 1959, when the Criminal Code was amended, and the Supreme Court of Canada overruled a ruling by the Nova Scotia Court of Appeal that held that the Hicklin test was still in effect. The Columbus of Sex by John Hofsess was the first film in Canada charged with obscenity. The film was ordered to be destroyed following the trial, but the film's producers, Reitman and Daniel Goldberg, sold the rights to an American company that recut the film into My Secret Life.

Last Tango in Paris was banned in Nova Scotia in 1974. Gerard McNeil, the editor of the Dartmouth Free Press, opposed the film's censorship and he filed a lawsuit in which he argued that the censors were acting illegally when they banned the film, that citizens have a right to view uncensored films regardless of their content, and that the taxes and fees collected by the Amusements Board was to continue its illegal activities. The censors argued that McNeil had no standing to sue as he had no direct interest in the case, but the Nova Scotia Supreme Court stated that "there could be a large number of persons with a valid desire to challenge". The court ruled on 2 February 1976 that the provinces had no power to censor films under the British North America Acts. However, the Supreme Court of Canada overruled the court on 19 January 1978, in a five to four decision.

=== Preservation ===
In 1924, the majority of Ouimet's Specialty Film Import's collection was destroyed by fire.

The University of Alberta created a film library in 1917, and Quebec was the first province to utilize film in schools. The rights to Carry on, Sergeant! were acquired by the National Film Archive of Canada and reconstructed the film with Gordon Sparling, who worked on it as an assistant director, to show on television in 1968. The Canadian Film Archives was formed by the NFB in 1951.

The NFB accumulated around 80 million feet of film in an air force hangar by 1953, but no funding was given for its proper storage by the National Film Act. A nitrate vault that could contain up to 1,000 cans of 35 mm film, worth one million feet, was planned. A successful test fire using 1.25 million feet of scrapped newsreel film was done in June 1952. The rising costs for the construction of the NFB's headquarters in Montreal resulted in the Department of Public Works cancelling the construction of film vaults. 13.1 million metres of archival footage worth $4.8 million (equivalent to $43,544,751 in 2025) was instead stored in Kirkland, Quebec, and were destroyed in a fire in July 1967. Federal funding for film preservation was adopted in 1969, and the National Film Archives was created in 1973.

== Financial ==
Box office revenue
Year	Revenue	Reference(s)
1930	$38,479,500	
1933	$24,954,200	
1934	$25,338,100	
1935	$27,173,400	
1936	$29,610,300	
1937	$32,499,300	
1938	$33,635,052	
1939	$34,010,115	
1940	$37,858,955	
1941	$41,369,259	
1942	$46,461,097	
1943	$52,567,989	
1944	$53,173,325	
1945	$55,430,711	
1946	$59,888,972	
1947	$62,865,279	
1948	$69,657,248	
1949	$78,559,779	
2012	$1,770,000,000	
2013	$1,764,000,000	
2014	$1,647,000,000	
2015	$1,743,000,000	
2016	$1,778,000,000	
2017	$1,774,000,000	
2018	$1,878,000,000	
2019	$1,873,000,000	
2020	$553,000,000	
2021	$814,000,000	

Theatre admissions
Year	Admissions	Reference(s)
1934	107,354,509	
1935	117,520,795	
1936	126,913,547	
1937	133,668,450	
1938	137,381,280	
1939	137,898,668	
1940	151,590,799	
1941	161,677,731	
1942	182,845,765	
1943	204,677,550	
1944	208,167,180	
1945	215,573,267	
1946	227,538,798	
1947	221,528,177	
1948	224,055,171	
1949	236,017,859	
1950	240,824,982	
1951	250,547,499	
1952	261,475,867	
1953	257,965,182	
1954	236,158,824	
1955	201,247,408	
1956	177,615,767	
1957	156,701,458	
1958	146,483,741	
1959	128,859,395	
1959	117,734,361	

Timeline of the highest-grossing domestic film record
Established	Title	Record setting gross	Reference(s)
1970	Two Women in Gold (Deux Femmes en or)	$2.5-4 million	
1982	Porky's	$11.2 million	
2006	Bon Cop, Bad Cop	$12.2 million	

Timeline of the most expensive films
Year	Production	Cost (est.)	Refs and notes
1914	Evangeline	$30,000	
1919	Back to God's Country	$165,000	
1928	Carry on, Sergeant!	$350,000	
1947	Whispering City (Note: La Forteresse, a French version of the film that was shot simultaneously, was also budgeted at $750,000. Producer Paul L'Anglais stated that the initial budget was $600,000 for both films, but later increased to $1,000,000 with 80% being spent on Whispering City and 20% spent on La Forteresse.)	$750,000	
1971	Sex in the Snow	$800,000	
1973	Kamouraska	$905,000	
1973	The Neptune Factor	$2,500,000	
1978	Angela	$3,000,000	
1979	Murder by Decree	$5,000,000	
1979	City of Fire	$5,300,000	
1979	Bear Island	$12,100,000	
1981	Quest for Fire	$12,500,000	
1983	Spacehunter: Adventures in the Forbidden Zone	$14,400,000	
1984	Louisiana	$15,000,000	
1990	Bethune: The Making of a Hero	$20,000,000	
1992	Shadow of the Wolf	$31,000,000	

Telefilm revenue and expenditure
Year	Revenue	Production expenditure	Marketing expenditure	Other expenditure	Total Expenditure	Reference(s)
1985	$51 million	$38 million	$3 million	$8 million	$49 million	
1986	$80 million	$66 million	$4 million	$8 million	$78 million	
1987	$96 million	$74 million	$6 million	$13 million	$93 million	
1988	$128 million	$100 million	$8 million	$18 million	$126 million	
1989	$144 million	$101 million	$23 million	$19 million	$143 million	
1990	$161 million	$116 million	$27 million	$21 million	$164 million	
1991	$163 million	$109 million	$29 million	$24 million	$162 million	
1992	$164 million	$107 million	$28 million	$25 million	$160 million	
1993	$157 million	$102 million	$25 million	$24 million	$151 million	
1994	$150 million	$101 million	$24 million	$23 million	$148 million	
1995	$152 million	$97 million	$26 million	$21 million	$144 million	

== See also ==
Awards

- Canadian Film Awards (1949-1978)
- Genie Awards (1980-2012)
- Canadian Screen Awards (2013-present)

By Province/Ethnicity

- Cinema of Quebec
- List of films set in Toronto
- List of films shot in Montreal
- List of films shot in Toronto
- List of films shot near Victoria, British Columbia
- List of Indigenous Canadian films
- List of Quebec films

Festivals

- List of film festivals in Canada
- Toronto International Film Festival

Films

- Canada's Top Ten
- Lists of Canadian films
- Top 10 Canadian Films of All Time

Genres & Movements

- Canuxploitation
- History of Canadian animation
- Northern (genre)
- Toronto New Wave

Professionals

- List of Canadian actors
- List of Canadian directors
- List of Quebec actors
- List of Quebec film directors

== Works cited ==
=== Books ===
- Backhouse, Charles (1974). Canadian Government Motion Picture Bureau 1917-1941. Canadian Film Institute.
- Beard, William; White, Jerry, eds. (2002). North of Everything: English-Canadian Cinema Since 1980. The University of Alberta Press. ISBN 0-88864-398-5.
- Bossin, Hye, ed. (1951). 1951 Year Book of the Canadian Motion Picture Industry. Film Publications of Canada.
- Bossin, Hye, ed. (1961). Film Weekly 1961-62 Year Book: Canadian Motion Picture Industry with Television Section. Film Publications of Canada.
- Bossin, Hye, ed. (1963). Film Weekly 1963-64 Year Book: Canadian Motion Picture Industry with Television Section. Film Publications of Canada.
- Browne, Colin (1979). Motion Picture Production in British Columbia, 1898-1940. British Columbia Provincial Museum. ISBN 0771881363.
- Clandfield, David (1987). Canadian Film. Oxford University Press. ISBN 0195405811.
- Dean, Malcolm (1981). Censored! Only in Canada: The History of Film Censorship - the Scandal Off the Screen. Virgo Press. ISBN 0920528325.
- Dilley, Constance (2018). Crosscurrents: How film policy developed in Quebec 1960-1983. Presses de l'Université du Québec. ISBN 9782760549395.
- Duffy, Dennis J. (1986). Camera West: British Columbia on Film 1941-1965. British Columbia Archives. ISBN 0771884796.
- Evans, Gary (1991). In the National Interest: A Chronicle of the National Film Board of Canada from 1949 to 1989. University of Toronto Press. ISBN 0802027849.
- Files, Gemma (2015). Experimental Film. ChiZine Publications. ISBN 9781771483490.
- Freitag, Gina; Loiselle, André, eds. (2015). The Canadian Horror Film: Terror of the Soul. University of Toronto Press. ISBN 978-1-4426-2850-2.
- Gasher, Mike (2002). Hollywood North: The Feature Film Industry in British Columbia. University of British Columbia Press.
- Graham, Gerald (1989). Canadian Film Technology, 1896-1986. University of Delaware Press. ISBN 0874133475.
- Hofsess, John (1975). Inner Views: Ten Canadian Film-Makers. Canadian Film Institute. ISBN 0070821909.
- Juneau, Pierre (1996). Making Our Voices Heard: Canadian Broadcasting and Film for the 21st Century. Minister of Public Services and Procurement. ISBN 0662241053.
- Loiselle, André (2003). Stage-Bound: Feature Film Adaptations of Canadian and Québécois Drama. McGill–Queen's University Press. doi:10.1515/9780773571464. ISBN 9780773571464.
- Magder, Ted (1993). Canada's Hollywood: The Canadian State and Feature Films. University of Toronto Press.
- Marshall, Bill (2001). Quebec National Cinema. McGill–Queen's University Press. ISBN 0-7735-2103-8.
- Melnyk, George (2004). One Hundred Years of Canadian Cinema. University of Toronto Press. ISBN 080203568X.
- Moore, Paul (2012). Mapping the Mass Circulation of Early Cinema: Film Debuts Coast-to-Coast In Canada in 1896 and 1897. University of Toronto Press.
- Morris, Peter, ed. (1970). Canadian Feature Films: 1913-69 Part 1: 1913-40. Canadian Film Institute.
- Morris, Peter, ed. (1978). Embattled Shadows: A History of Canadian Cinema 1895-1939. McGill–Queen's University Press. ISBN 9780773560727.
- Pallister, Janis (1995). The Cinema of Quebec: Masters in Their Own House. Associated University Presses. ISBN 0838635628.
- Pendakur, Manjunath (1990). Canadian Dreams & American Control: The Political Economy of the Canadian Film Industry. Garamond Press. ISBN 0920059937.
- Seiler, Robert (2013). Reel Time: Movie Exhibitors and Movie Audiences In Prairie Canada, 1896 to 1986. Athabasca University Press. ISBN 9781926836997.
- Spencer, Michael (2003). Hollywood North: Creating the Canadian Motion Picture Industry. Cantos International Publishing. ISBN 289594007X.
- Turner, D. John, ed. (1987). Canadian Feature Film Index: 1913-1985. Canadian Film Institute. ISBN 0660533642.
- Wise, Wyndham, ed. (2001). Take One's Essential Guide to Canadian film. University of Toronto Press. ISBN 0802035124.

=== Journals ===
- Brégent-Heald, Dominique (2012). "Vacationland: Film, Tourism, and Selling Canada, 1934-1948". Canadian Journal of Film Studies. 21 (2). University of Toronto Press: 27–48. doi:10.3138/cjfs.21.2.27. JSTOR 24411793.
- Constantinides, Zoë (2014). "The Myth of Evangeline and the Origin of Canadian National Cinema". Film History. 26 (1). Indiana University Press: 50–79. doi:10.2979/filmhistory.26.1.50. JSTOR 10.2979/filmhistory.26.1.50. S2CID 191465275.
- Fraticelli, Rina (2015). "Women In View On Screen: October 2015 Report" (PDF). Women in View. Telefilm Canada: 1–20.
- Gaudreault, André (1996). "The Introduction of the Lumière Cinematograph in Canada". Canadian Journal of Film Studies. 5 (2). SAGE Publishing: 113–123. doi:10.3138/cjfs.5.2.113. JSTOR 24402139.
- MacKenzie, David (2013). "An early effort in cultural diplomacy: The Canadian Co-operation Project and Canadian tourism". International Journal. 68 (4). SAGE Publishing: 576–590. JSTOR 24709360.

=== Press ===
- "A History of Women's Filmmaking At The National Film Board of Canada" (PDF) (Press release). National Film Board of Canada. 2017. Archived from the original (PDF) on 2023-02-15.
- "Profile 2021: Economic Report On The Screen-Based Media Production Industry In Canada" (PDF) (Press release) (25 ed.). Telefilm Canada. 2021. pp. 1–101.
- Duffy, Dennis J.; Mattison, David (1989). "A. D. Kean, Canada's Cowboy Movie-Maker". The Beaver. Vol. 69, no. 1. p. 28-41.
- Klady, Leonard (1998). "Telefilm Celebrates 30 Years" (Press release). Variety.
- Mattison, David (1985). "The British Columbia Government's first Film Unit". Reel West Magazine. Vol. 1, no. 4.
- Smith, Stephen (June 24, 1989). "A director 'by guess and by God'". The Kingston Whig-Standard. p. 11 – via Newspapers.com.
