= Canadian Government Motion Picture Bureau =

Film production agency of the Government of Canada

Agency overview
- Formed: September 1918
- Preceding agency: Exhibits and Publicity Bureau
- Dissolved: 1941
- Superseding agency: National Film Board of Canada
- Agency executive: Fred Badgely, Director
- Parent department: Department of Trade and Commerce

The Canadian Government Motion Picture Bureau (CGMPB; French: Bureau de cinématographie du gouvernement canadien), founded as the Exhibits and Publicity Bureau, was the film production agency of the Government of Canada administered by the Department of Trade and Commerce, and intended to promote trade and industry. Created in 1918, it was the first government film production organization in the world.

Its purpose, according to the Minister of Trade and Commerce, was "advertising abroad Canada's scenic attractions, agricultural resources and industrial development," and much of its production was devoted to producing travelogues and industrial films.

It also produced early Canadian documentaries such as Lest We Forget (1935), a compilation film (using newsreel footage with staged sequences) recounting Canada's role in the First World War, written, directed, and edited by Frank Badgley, the director of the Bureau from 1927 to 1941; and The Royal Visit (1939), also co-written and edited by Badgley, which documented the 1939 royal tour of Canada by King George VI and his consort, Queen Elizabeth.

== History ==
The CGMPB was created in September 1918 by an order in council as the Exhibits and Publicity Bureau.

Its first success was a bi-weekly series of short informational films called Living Canada, which began production in 1919 and was distributed theatrically throughout Canada and abroad. By 1920, the Bureau maintained the largest studio and post-production facility in Canada. On 1 April 1923, it was renamed the Canadian Government Motion Picture Bureau.

The Bureau was in its prime during the period of 1920 to 1931, when it had the largest and best equipped film studio in Canada and distributed its films throughout Canada and the Commonwealth, as well as in France, Belgium, the Netherlands, Argentina, Chile, Japan, China, and the United States. At its peak in 1927, it had over one thousand prints circulating in the United States alone.

Into the 1930s, the Bureau began to see a decline, as its films were bland and of poor quality; it lacked a national policy, it was falling behind Associated Screen News of Canada, technologically and in terms of distribution. Underfunding and mismanagement made it difficult to invest in the arrival of sound film, and the Bureau continued to produce silent films until 1934.

By this time, government ministries began producing their own promotional films, usually using outside contractors rather than relying on the CGMPB. Most Canadian films during this decade were produced by the CGMPB or Associated Screen News, which was funded by the Canadian Pacific Railway and highly profitable in its own right. As such, concerns began to arise over the domination of American films in Canadian theatres.

In February 1936, a report written by Ross McLean, secretary of Vincent Massey, the Canadian High Commissioner in London, recommended an in-depth study of the government's production of promotional films and suggested the name of acclaimed British documentary filmmaker John Grierson. In 1938, Prime Minister William Lyon Mackenzie King heeded the report, agreeing that Canadian cinema deserves an increased presence in Canadian theatres; he commissioned Grierson thereafter to review the situation and make recommendations. This became the basis of the National Film Act (1939), written by Grierson himself, and the creation of the National Film Commission (later the National Film Board of Canada, or NFB), which Grierson modeled after Associated Screen News. Production and distribution of national films would be taken care of by this new organization, which coordinated the cinematographic activities of all the ministries; the CGMPB, on the other hand, would be in charge of the films' technical production.

In June 1940, Grierson recommended merging the CGMPB and the NFB. The two agencies coexisted for nearly another two years until 1941, when this consolidation took place and the NFB finally absorbed the CGMPB.

== See also ==
- Ontario Motion Picture Bureau
