= Hiawatha, the Messiah of the Ojibway =

1903 film by Joe Rosenthal

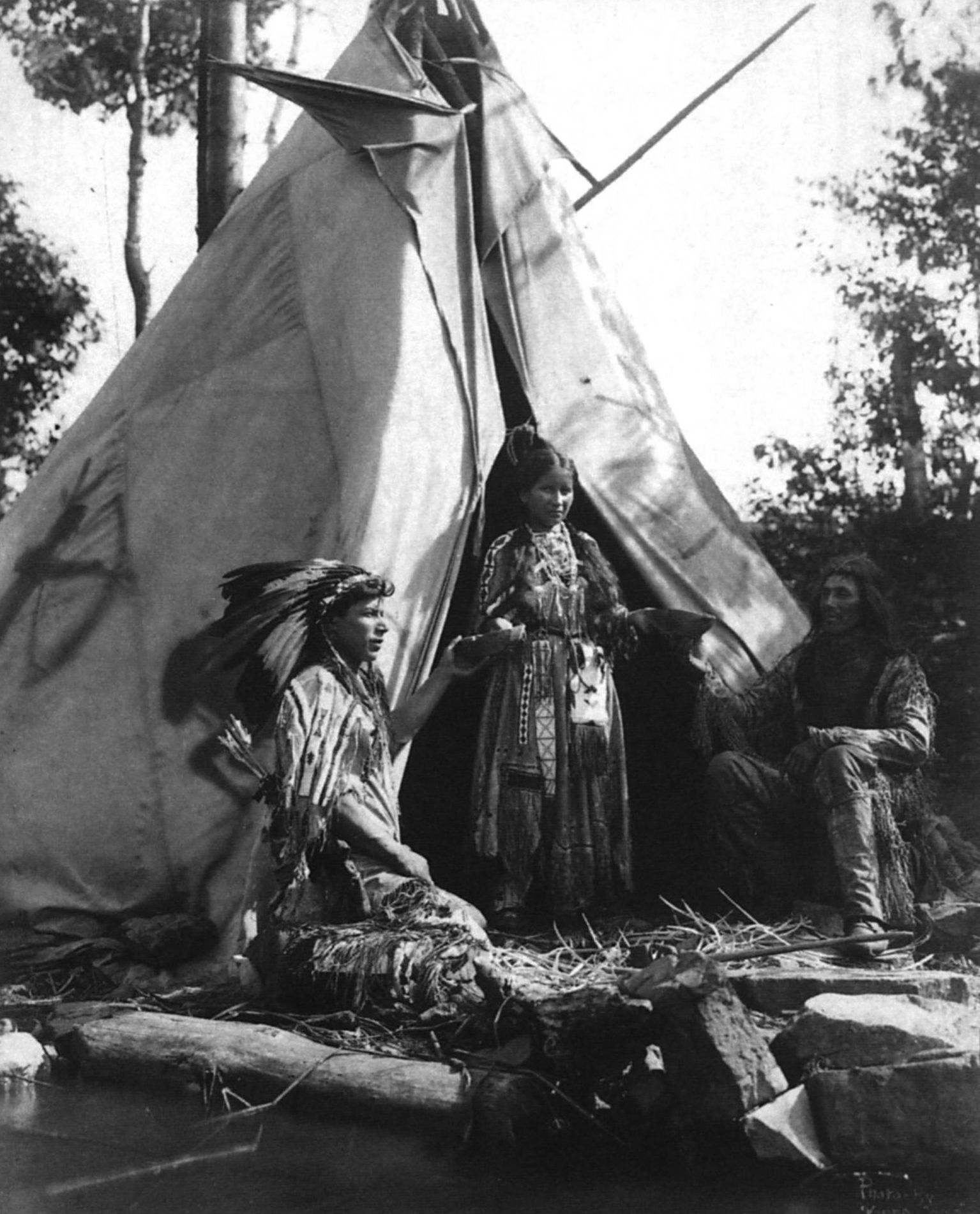
- Directed by: Joseph Rosenthal
- Written by: E. Armstrong
- Cinematography: Joseph Rosenthal
- Production companies: Charles Urban Trading Company; Canadian Bioscope Company
- Release date: 1903
- Running time: 15 minutes
- Country: Canada

Hiawatha, the Messiah of the Ojibway is a 1903 dramatic short film shot in Canada directed by the American pioneering cinematographer and director Joseph Rosenthal, based on the Henry Wadsworth Longfellow's famous poem, The Song of Hiawatha, made in Desbarats, Ontario, with a cast of Ojibway First Nations people. According to the Canadian Journal of Film Studies, it was the first dramatic narrative film to be shot in Canada.

== Production ==
Joseph Rosenthal was the director and cinematographer. E. Armstrong adapted Henry Wadsworth Longfellow's poem The Song of Hiawatha. Hiawatha was 15 minutes long using 800 feet of film. It is considered the first dramatic film in Canadian history. It was considerably longer than the usual productions of 1903, which rarely exceeded three minutes. The film's subtitle was The Passion Play of America and was largely a photographed stage play with Longfellow's words spoken in a natural surrounding. It is now a lost film and only a few pictures remain.

== Works cited ==
- Ross, Ryan (2012). "Hiawatha, The Messiah of the Ojibway (1903): Photographic Stills From The First Dramatic Narrative Film Made In Canada". Canadian Journal of Film Studies. 21 (2). University of Toronto Press: 140–47. doi:10.2307/24411798. JSTOR 24411798.
