= Canadian Bioscope Company =

Canadian film company

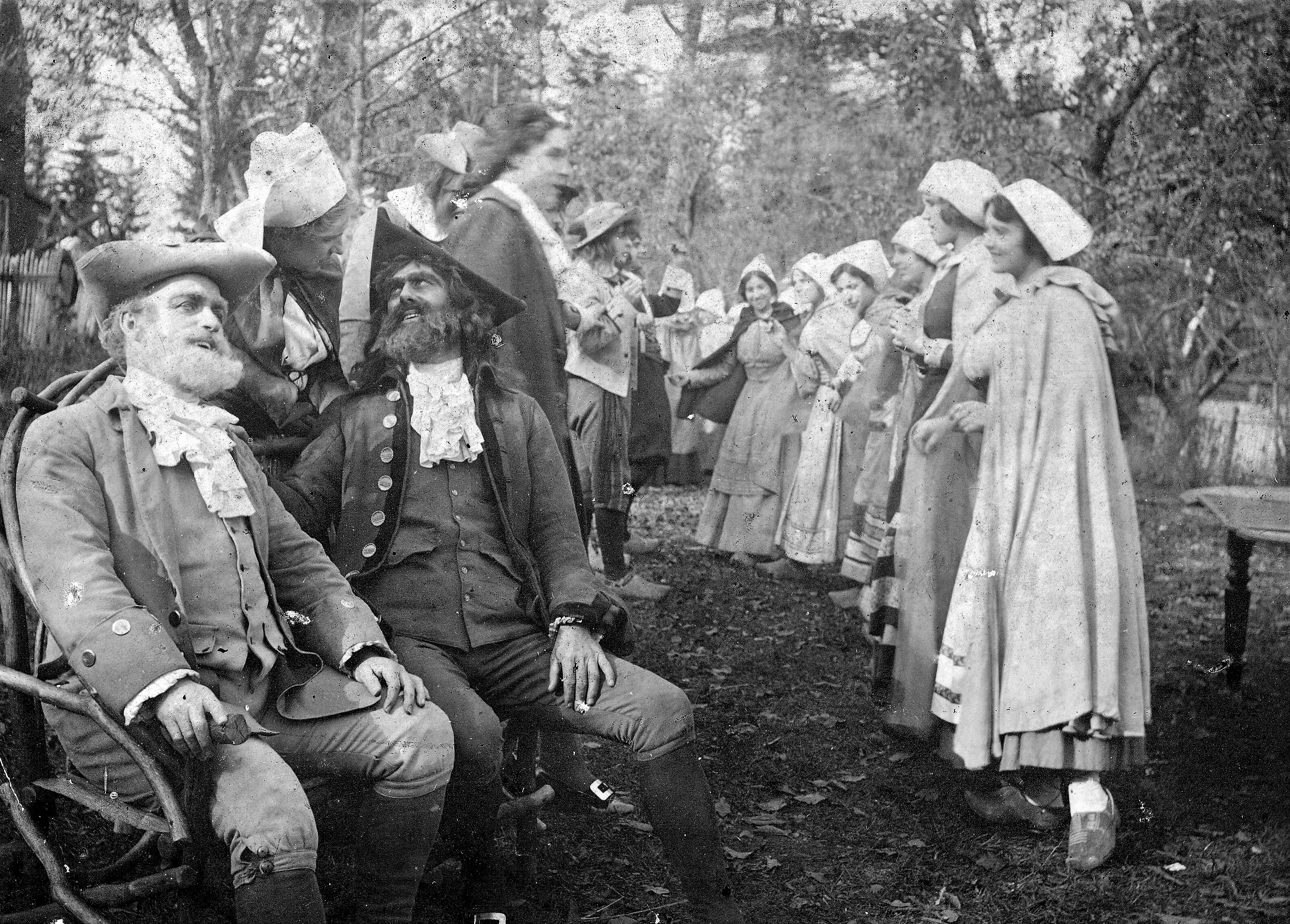
A scene from Evangeline

The Canadian Bioscope Company was a film company formed in Halifax, Nova Scotia, on December 4, 1912, and dissolved on February 10, 1915. Founded by British-born Captain H.H.B. Holland, Canadian Bioscope established offices in Halifax and New York City. Canadian Bioscope's Halifax office and studios were located at 108 Pleasant St. (now Barrington St.), at the south end, property now occupied by the "Foundry" building. A pioneer in the Canadian film industry (it was only the second such company established in Canada), this Maritime-based firm, employing both Nova Scotians and Americans, sought to develop an international distribution network from the outset, in order to ensure economic longevity and provide Nova Scotian films to the world.

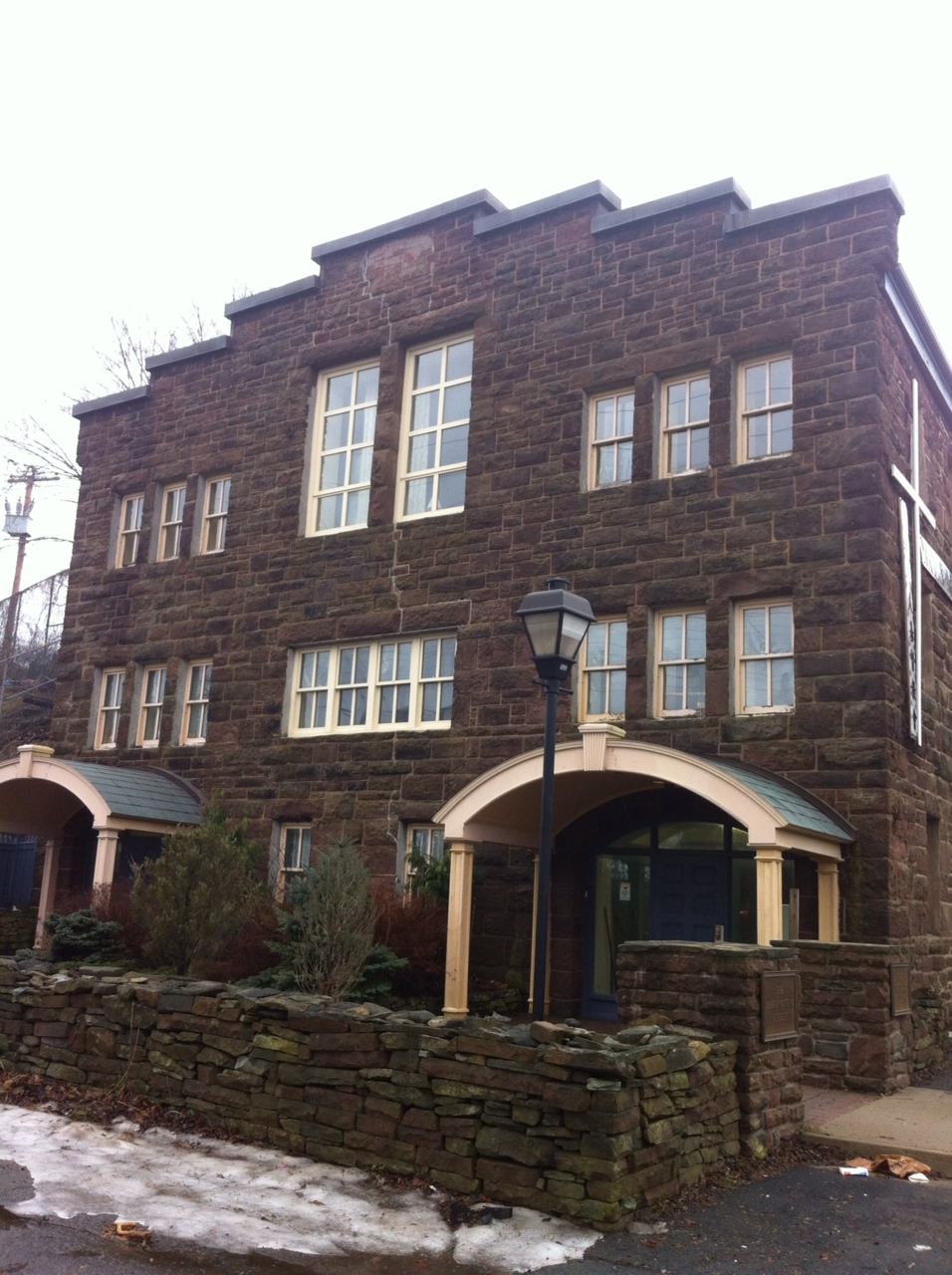
Canadian Bioscope Company location, Barrington St., Halifax, Nova Scotia

This venture combined American and local investment and talent to make Canada's first feature-length dramatic film, Evangeline, released in February 1914. The Canadian Bioscope Company boasted that using actual locations where the events of Longfellow's poem had occurred lent the film great authenticity. The film was both a commercial and artistic success. Actual viewings of and critical response to the film have been traced from New York City to Regina until May 1914. Their success, however, allowed the company to make three more dramatic short films and three comedies.

"Canadian Bioscope: A Halifax Enterprise in Moving Picture Films," Financial Post, Jan.17, 1914, p. 3

Halifax, Jan.14 - The Canadian Bioscope Company, Limited, has been in operation in Halifax for about a year. Their business is to manufacture moving picture films, and for this purpose they have erected a wood and glass studio in this city. The company has a capital of $50,000, which is probably pretty well all taken up, and they are now making a further issue. The company in its prospectus proposed to run summer entertainments on its grounds surrounding the studio, but this part of the enterprise is still untried. they have made some smaller pictures, but the big thing has been the manufacture of a great feature film in the five reels illustrating Longfellow's story of "Evangeline." This film is said to have cost $30,000, and to be a very good one. Great pains were taken to make the Evangeline film attractive and realistic. Captain Herbert H. B. Holland, a Quebec man, is the manager and promoter. No income has yet been earned by the company, and it is to be hoped that its efforts will prove financially as well as artistically successful. There is certainly money in the manufacture of moving picture films when the management is good and an adequate supply of capital. Halifax hopes for the best from this company; the people have subscribed for the stock quite generally in small amounts, and there is said to be a good chance for success, providing the management is efficient.

The company and all of its assets disappeared as World War I began.

== Films ==
- Evangeline
- Saved From Himself (drama)
- Mariner's Compass (drama)
- In the Enemy's Power/ The Mexican Sniper's Revenge (drama)
- A Neglected Wife (comedy)
- Willie's Birthday Present (comedy)
- Thou Shalt Not Steal (comedy)

The company also made films of the commemorations of Historical plaques by the Nova Scotia Historical Society that were shown throughout Canada and the British Isles.

== See also ==
- Cinema of Canada
