= Ontario Motion Picture Bureau =

The Ontario Motion Picture Bureau was established by the Government of Ontario in 1917 and was the first state-founded film organization in the world, preceding the Canadian Government Motion Picture Bureau by a year. Its mandate was to carry out "educational work for farmers, school children, factory workers and other classes", to promote the province and its resources and "to encourage the building of highways and other public works". An extension of a growing movement to regulate theatres and films being shown in them, it was also established in an attempt to "counter the growing tide of un-British pictures being shown in theatres" throughout the province.

Initially, the Bureau hired private film companies in Toronto to produce films under its editorial control. Canada Weekly reported in 1918 that, resulting from its establishment, that "Ontario now leads the world in visual education work". By 1923, the OMPB acquired its own studio, in Trenton, Ontario, previously owned by Adanac Films, and began producing its own educational films distributing 1,500 reels monthly by 1925. These films were mostly screened in churches, schools and community institutions.

By the late 1920s, its films were increasingly viewed as outdated, while the Bureau itself was being criticised as having a large and unwieldy bureaucracy. It was dissolved on October 26, 1934 by the new Liberal government of Mitchell Hepburn, who had pledged during the 1934 provincial election to cut the size of government. The Bureau's property in Trenton was donated as a community hall.

== Films include ==
- Tiny's Troublesome Tooth, early animated film produced by Filmart Motion Pictures for the Ontario Motion Picture Bureau.
- Her Own Fault, 1921 educational film produced for the Bureau on behalf of the Division of Industrial Hygiene of the Ontario Provincial Board of Health to demonstrate the consequences of unhealthy lifestyle choices. The story follows two factory women, Mamie and Eileen, throughout their daily activities. Her Own Fault is an educational film that would have originally been shown in schools, churches and other public venues.
- Transport in the North, 1925 film about life in northern Ontario produced by OMPB's studio in Trenton.
- Carry On, Sergeant!, 1928, promoted as Canada's first epic film, a silent, expensive financial failure shot at the Trenton Studios, directed by Bruce Bairnsfather.
- Cinderella of the Farms, 1930, the only dramatic feature-length production by the OMPB
