= Evangeline (1914 film) =

1914 Canadian film

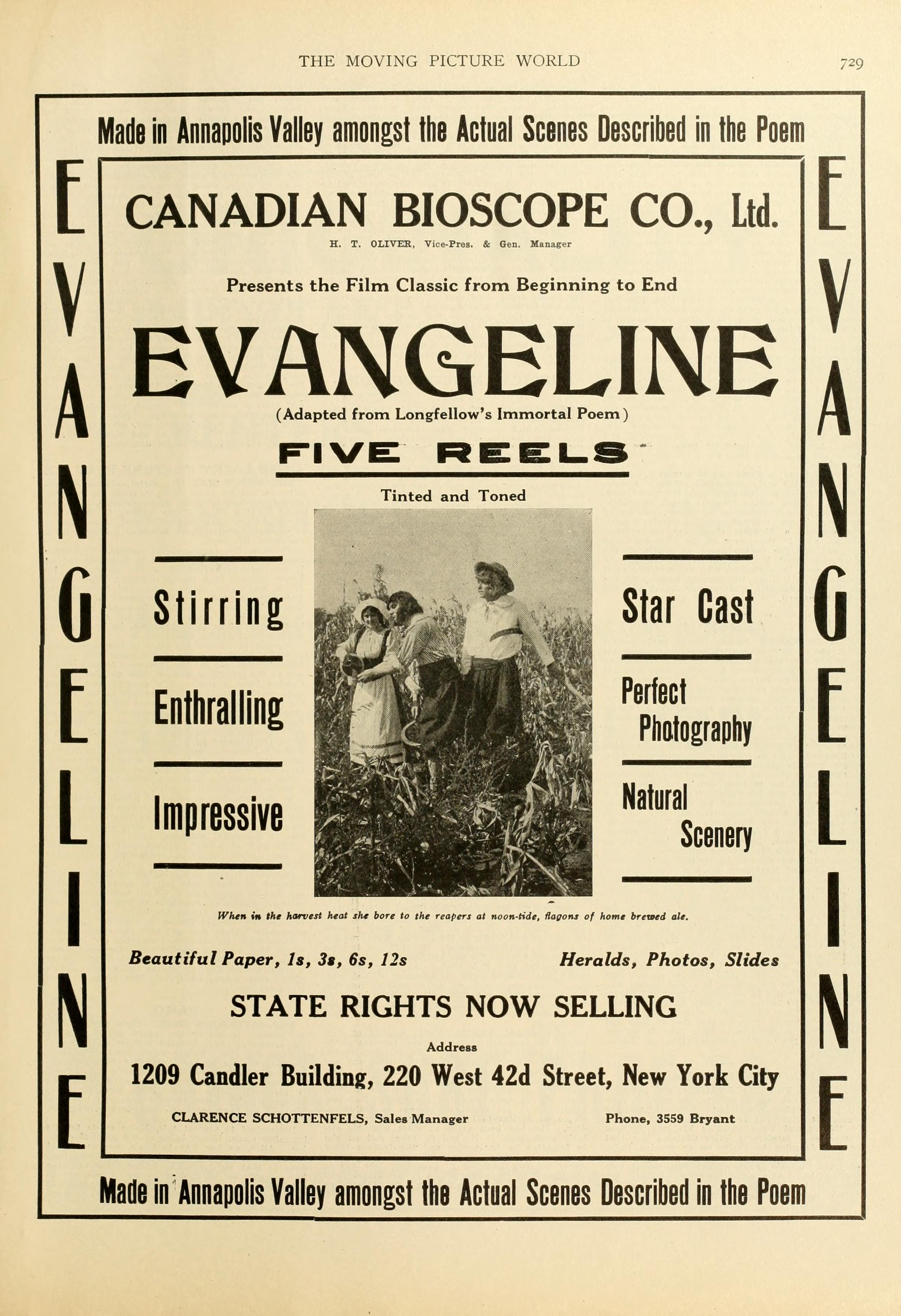
- Advertisement for the film in The Moving Picture World
- Directed by: Edward P. Sullivan; William Cavanaugh
- Written by: Marguerite Marquis
- Produced by: Herbert H.B. Holland; G.J.B. Metzler
- Starring: Laura Lyman; John F. Carleton
- Cinematography: William C. Thompson; H. Thomas Oliver
- Production company: Canadian Bioscope Company
- Release date: 2 February 1914 (Halifax, Nova Scotia)
- Running time: 75 minutes
- Country: Canada
- Languages: Silent film English intertitles
- Budget: $30,000
- Box office: $29,000

Evangeline is a 1914 Canadian silent drama film directed by Edward P. Sullivan and William Cavanaugh and starring Laura Lyman and John F. Carleton. The screenplay was adapted from Henry Wadsworth Longfellow's 1847 poem Evangeline by Marguerite Marquis. It is the earliest recorded fictional Canadian feature film.

The Canadian Bioscope Company produced Evangeline at locations in Nova Scotia and Quebec during 1913 for a cost of $30,000. The film's directors and lead actors were Americans while the supporting cast were Canadians. The film was shown in New York City before its Canadian premiere in Halifax, Nova Scotia, and was shown throughout Canada and the United States where it received positive reviews for its faithful adaption of Longfellow's poem. It is now a lost film.

== Plot ==
The peaceful life of the Acadians is shown during Evangeline Bellefontaine and Gabriel Lajeunesse's youth. Years later Governor Charles Lawrence orders the expulsion of the Acadians. The families of Evangeline and Gabriel are separated during the expulsion. Evangeline spends years searching for Gabriel and finds him shortly before his death and burial.

== Cast ==
- Laura Lyman as Evangeline Bellefontaine
- John F. Carleton as Gabriel Lajeunesse
- Edward P. Sullivan as Father Felician
- Arthur Morrison as Basil
- Michael Hannafy as Benedict Bellefontaine
- William Cavanaugh as Rene LeBlanc
- R.J. Leary as Michael
- William J. Johnson as fat boy
- Marguerite Marquis as Shawnee Indian woman
- Glad Gillian as Acadian maid
- Frances Purcell as Acadian maid
- Rhea Rafuse as Acadian maid

== Production ==
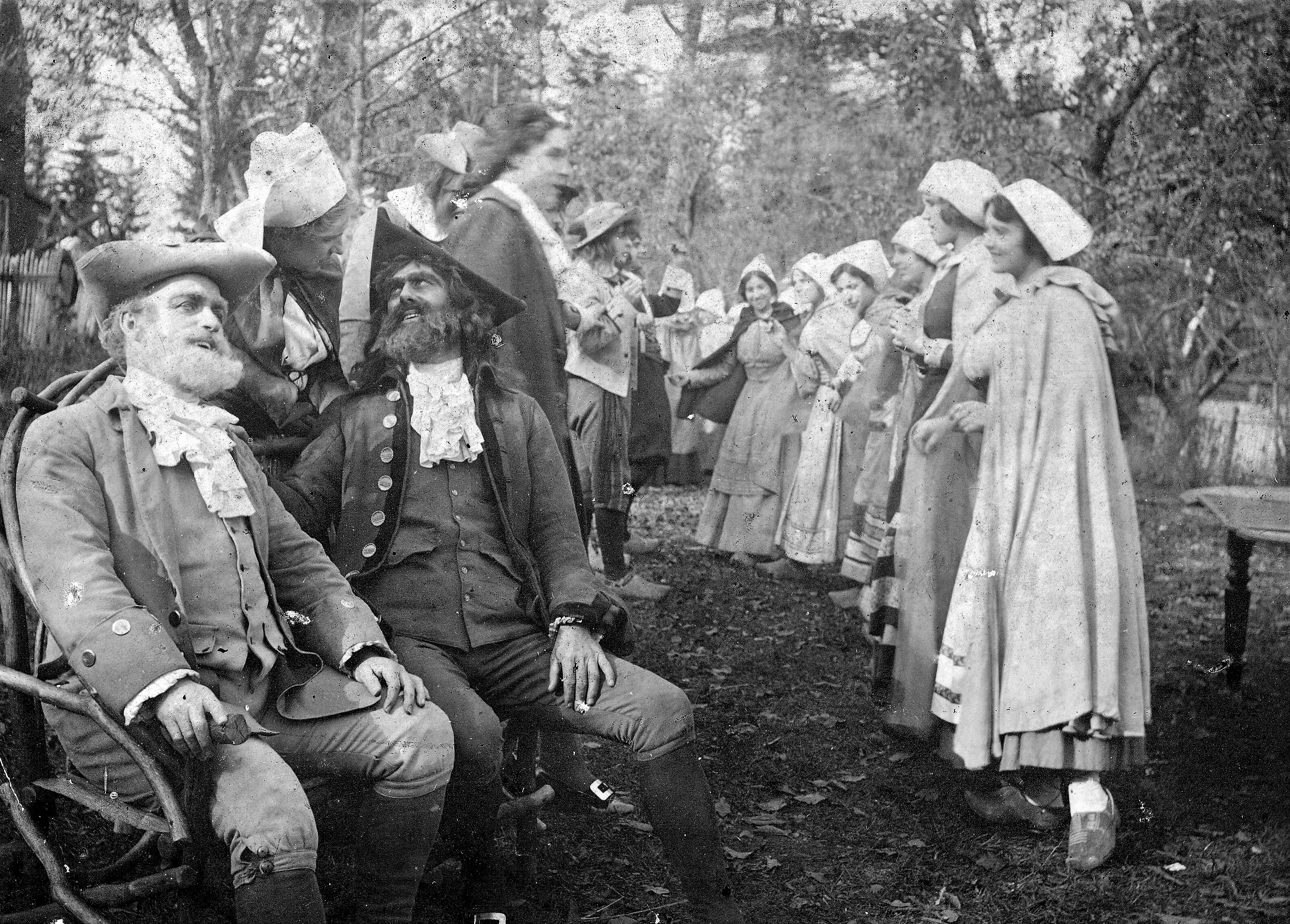
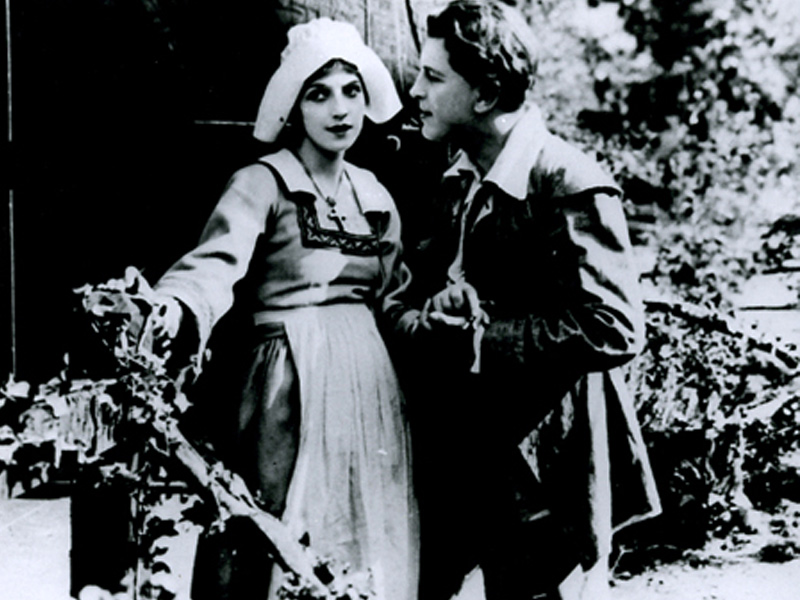
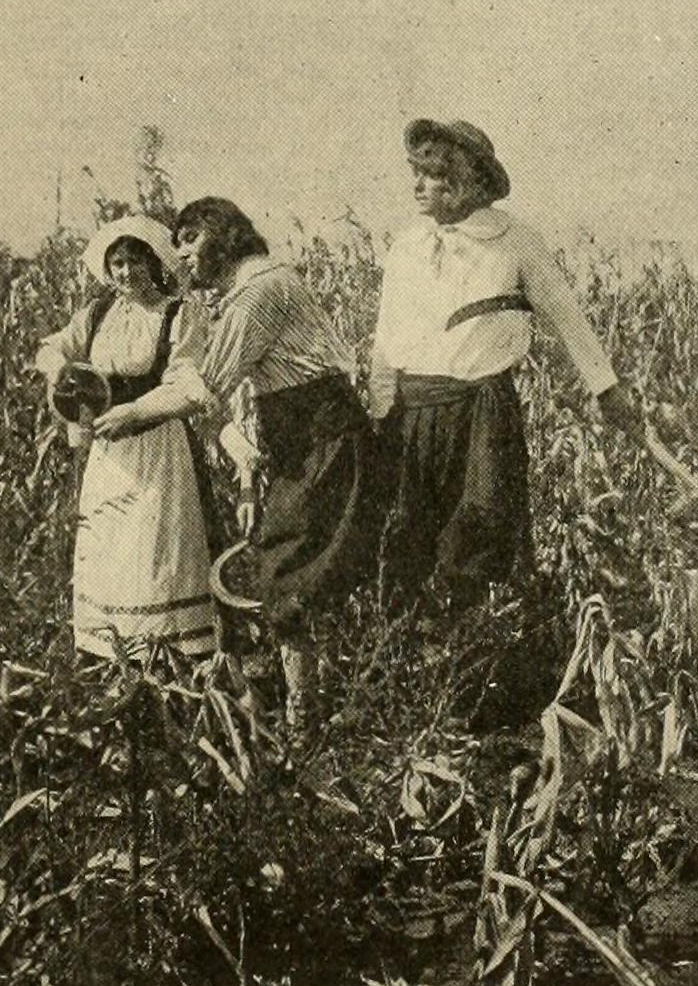
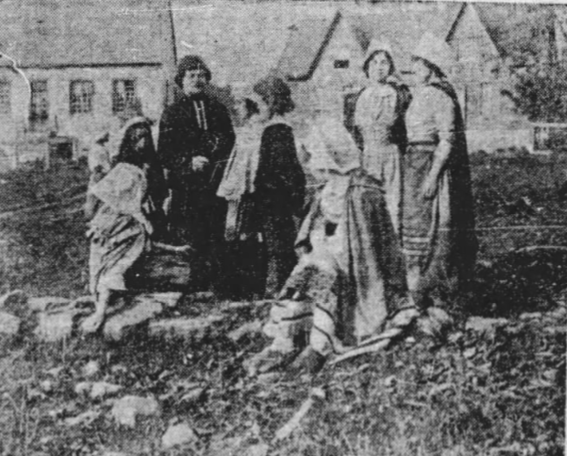
A collection of scenes from the film

The Canadian Bioscope Company was established by Herbert H.B. Holland in 1912, in Halifax, Nova Scotia. H.Thomas Oliver, an American cinematographer who had previous worked for Edison Studios was the company's general manager and vice-president. The company produced seven films and three shorts before going bankrupt.

Marguerite Marquis wrote a screenplay based on Henry Wadsworth Longfellow's poem Evangeline which had already been adapted into a film in 1911, and again in 1919 and 1929. The film was produced at a cost of $30,000 (equivalent to $826,067 in 2025). Filming was completed by November 1913, and was done on location in Nova Scotia at Annapolis Royal, Annapolis Valley, Dartmouth, Grand-Pré, Halifax, Port-Royal, and Preston, and in Quebec at Oka and Sainte-Rose. The cinematography was done by William C. Thompson and Oliver. The final film was a black-and-white 35 mm silent five-reel film with a runtime of 75 minutes.

William Cavanaugh, who worked for Pathe Freres, and Edward P. Sullivan, who worked for Edison Studios, directed the film. The directors and lead actors, Laura Lyman and John F. Carleton, were Americans while Canadians played the supporting roles.

It is the earliest recorded fictional feature film produced in Canada. Sam Kula, the leader of the National Film Archives of Canada, stated in 1975 that Madeleine de Verchères, by the British American Film Manufacturing Company, was the first Canadian feature film as it started filming in 1912. However, it is a lost film and is lacking evidence of its existence.

== Release and reception ==
The film was initially shown in New York City before its Canadian release in Halifax, on February 2, 1914, at the Empire Theater, which was operated by the Canadian Bioscope Company. The film was also shown in Amherst, Nova Scotia, submitted to the censorship boards in Montreal, St. John, and Toronto, and shipped to Oklahoma, New York, and San Francisco, California. The film made $8,000 during its theatrical run in Nova Scotia and $21,000 from other areas. The film is currently lost.

The film received positive reviews upon release. The mayor of Annapolis Royal, the rector of St. Luke's Church, and the caretaker of Fort Anne stated that they were "moved almost to tears by the acting of the women and children" during the graveyard scene. Longfellow's daughter watched the film and praised it. The Morning Telegraph praised the film for its faithful adaption of the poem, with every subtitle being a quotation from the poem, and for the visuals being based on famous paintings.

== Legacy ==
In 2013, Canadian filmmaker Bashar Shbib released The Search For Evangeline, a documentary film about his failed efforts to track down a copy of the film.

== See also ==
- List of Canadian films

== Works cited ==
- Turner, D. John, ed. (1987). Canadian Feature Film Index: 1913-1985. Canadian Film Institute. ISBN 0660533642.
- Constantinides, Zoë (2014). "The Myth of Evangeline and the Origin of Canadian National Cinema". Film History. 26 (1). Indiana University Press: 50. doi:10.2979/filmhistory.26.1.50. S2CID 191465275.
- Morris, Peter, ed. (1978). Embattled Shadows: A History of Canadian Cinema 1895-1939. McGill–Queen's University Press. ISBN 9780773560727.
