= The Immortal Scoundrel =

- French: Étienne Brûlé gibier de potence
- Directed by: Melburn E. Turner
- Written by: Jeanette Downing
- Based on: Étienne Brûlé by J. Herbert Cranston
- Produced by: Melburn E. Turner
- Starring: Paul Dupuis; Jacques Auger
- Edited by: Melburn E. Turner
- Production company: Carillon Pictures
- Distributed by: France Film
- Release date: 19 September 1952
- Running time: 102 minutes
- Country: Canada
- Language: French
- Budget: $100,000

The Immortal Scoundrel (French: Étienne Brûlé gibier de potence) is a 1952 Canadian film directed by Melburn E. Turner.

== Plot ==
Étienne Brûlé arrives in New France with Samuel de Champlain in 1608. becomes involved with the Huron and receives military aid from them.

== Production ==
The film was shot in Saint-Adolphe-d'Howard from 23 July to 28 September 1951, on a budget of $100,000 (equivalent to $1,189,855 in 2025). It was the first colour feature film made in Canada. It was shot on 16 mm Kodachrome and then transferred to 35 mm colour film.

== Release ==
France Film distributed the film in Quebec and it premiered on 19 September 1952.

== Works cited ==
- Pallister, Janis (1995). The Cinema of Quebec: Masters in Their Own House. Associated University Presses. ISBN 0838635628.
- Turner, D. John, ed. (1987). Canadian Feature Film Index: 1913-1985. Canadian Film Institute. ISBN 0660533642.
