= Ten Years in Manitoba =

1898 Canadian documentary film by James Freer

Ten Years in Manitoba is a Canadian documentary film, directed by James Freer and released in 1898. Although now lost, it is generally credited as the first known film by a Canadian filmmaker. Consisting of footage of various scenes from the province of Manitoba, the film was exhibited in the United Kingdom in April 1898 as part of a promotional campaign, sponsored by the Canadian Pacific Railway, to encourage immigration to the province.

The film was a compilation of short scenes, with titles including "Six Binders at Work in Hundred Acre Wheatfield", "Harvesting Scene, with Trains Passing By", "Pacific and Atlantic Mail Trains" and "Arrival of CPR Express at Winnipeg". Other scenes whose titles are not confirmed reportedly depicted Freer's own home and family, as well as footage of Thomas Greenway, the Premier of Manitoba, stooking grain on his own farm.

The Manitoba Historical Society has, however, confirmed that at least part of Freer's film appears to have consisted of footage filmed by other people; several months earlier, a Winnipeg bartender named Richard Hardie, an American filmmaker named E. H. Amet and an entertainment producer named Cosgrove were known to have been exhibiting kinetographs in various Manitoba communities that included farm harvesting footage, including Greenway stooking grain, although they engaged in a dispute through letters to the Winnipeg Free Press as to who had been the creator of the films. Freer appears to have acquired their films, and included them in Ten Years in Manitoba along with some of his own original footage.
