= James Freer =

- Born: 4 January 1855; Woodstock, Oxfordshire, England
- Died: December 1933 (aged 78); Winnipeg, Manitoba, Canada
- Resting place: Elmwood Cemetery, Winnipeg
- Occupation(s): Film director, farmer
- Years active: 1897–1902
- Spouse: Emily Jenkins (1878–1933)
- Children: 8

James Simmons Freer (4 January 1855 – 22 December 1933) was a Canadian filmmaking pioneer.

Born in Woodstock, Oxfordshire Freer was a newspaper reporter who emigrated to Manitoba, Canada in 1888 from Bristol and became a farmer, settling south of Winnipeg, in the Brandon Hills district. Less than two years after the Lumière Brothers exhibited the first film in France, Freer became the first Canadian filmmaker. He made films about the Canadian prairies, especially themes of farming and railways, which were shown as early as 1897. The Canadian Pacific Railway Company noticed Freer's films and began to tour them throughout the United Kingdom in an effort to promote immigration to Canada. Ten Years in Manitoba was shown through the British Isles in 1898.

The tour was so successful that a second tour of Freer's films took place in 1902. The second tour was sponsored by Sir Clifford Sifton, Canadian Minister of the Interior, who was eager to promote immigration to the Canadian west, especially those from English speaking countries. The second trip was not as successful a recruiting device because people had heard that Freer had downplayed Manitoba's mosquito problem and cold winters.

This ended his film career and he later worked for the Winnipeg Free Press and died in Winnipeg in 1933.
