= List of films shot near Victoria, British Columbia =

The following is a list of films shot wholly or partly in the Capital Regional District surrounding Victoria, British Columbia, Canada, the capital of British Columbia. Numerous TV shows and movies have been filmed in Victoria due to its proximity to Metro Vancouver, nicknamed "Hollywood North." Other earlier films were shot at Willows Park Studio in Greater Victoria and include: 1933 The Crimson Paradise, 1935 Secrets of Chinatown, 1936 Fury and the Woman (aka Lucky Corrigan), Lucky Fugitives, Secret Patrol, Stampede, Tugboat Princess, What Price Vengeance, Manhattan Shakedown, Murder is News, Woman Against the World, Death Goes North, Convicted, Special Inspector, Commandos Strike at Dawn.

== Films ==
Film	Year	Locations	References
Convicted	1938	Victoria, British Columbia, Canada	
Commandos Strike at Dawn	1942	Saanich, British Columbia, Canada	
Son of Lassie	1945	Victoria's Airport, other locations on Vancouver Island, other locations in Western Canada	
Vixen!	1968	Inner Harbour, Victoria, British Columbia, Canada	
Five Easy Pieces	1970	Central Saanich, British Columbia, Canada	
Harry in Your Pocket	1973	Victoria, British Columbia, Canada	
The Changeling	1980	Colwood, British Columbia, Canada	
Dawn of the Living Socks	1982	Victoria, British Columbia, Canada	
The Glitter Dome	1984	Victoria, British Columbia, Canada	
Hot Pursuit	1987	Victoria, British Columbia, Canada	
Backfire	1988	Saanichton, British Columbia, Canada	
Bird on a Wire	1989	Victoria, British Columbia, Canada	
Knight Moves	1992	Empress Hotel, Victoria, British Columbia, Canada	
Digger	1993	Victoria, British Columbia, Canada	
Intersection	1994	Victoria, British Columbia, Canada	
Little Women	1994	Victoria, British Columbia, Canada	
Masterminds	1997	Colwood, British Columbia, Canada	
The Duke	1999	Victoria, British Columbia, Canada	
Final Destination	2000	Victoria, British Columbia, Canada	
Scary Movie	2000	Victoria, British Columbia, Canada	
Cats & Dogs	2001	Victoria, British Columbia, Canada	
Ripper	2001	Victoria, British Columbia, Canada	
Black Point	2002	Brentwood Bay, British Columbia, Canada	
X2	2003	Colwood, British Columbia, Canada	
White Chicks	2004	Victoria, British Columbia, Canada	
Fierce People	2005	Victoria, British Columbia, Canada	
The Core	2006	Victoria, British Columbia, Canada	
Impact (TV miniseries)	2006	Victoria, British Columbia, Canada	
The Mermaid Chair	2006	Brentwood Bay, British Columbia, Canada	
X-Men Origins: Wolverine	2006	Colwood, British Columbia, Canada	
X-Men: The Last Stand	2006	Colwood, British Columbia, Canada	
In The Land Of Women	2007	Victoria, British Columbia, Canada	
Mulligans	2008	Victoria, British Columbia, Canada	
2012	2009	Victoria, British Columbia, Canada	
Kid Cannabis	2012	Victoria, British Columbia, Canada	
Descendants (2015 film)	2015	Victoria, British Columbia, Canada	
The Boy (2016 film)	2016	Victoria, British Columbia, Canada	
Pup Star (2016 film)	2016	Victoria, British Columbia, Canada	
Monkey Up (2016 film)	2016	Victoria, British Columbia, Canada	
Pup Star Better 2Gether (2017 film)	2017	Victoria, British Columbia, Canada	
Pup Star World Tour (2018 film)	2018	Victoria, British Columbia, Canada	
Deadpool	2018	Victoria, British Columbia, Canada	
Puppy Star Christmas	2018	Victoria, British Columbia, Canada	
Sailing Into Love	2019	Victoria, British Columbia, Canada	
Sidelined: The QB and Me	2024	Victoria, British Columbia, Canada	
Lucid	2025	Oak Bay	
The Bryce Lee Story	2026	Victoria	
