= Lest We Forget (1935 film) =

1935 Canadian film

Lest We Forget (1935) was the first feature-length documentary film with sound to be made in Canada. Written, directed and edited by Frank Badgley, who was then the Director of the Canadian Government Motion Picture Bureau, and W.W. Murray, with music by Edmund Sanborn and narrated by Rupert Caplan. A compilation, 10-reel film (using newsreel footage, graphics and staged sequences) recounting Canada’s role in the First World War, it is fast-paced and has a verbose narration but was well received by critics and audiences at the time. The Bureau was the precursor to the National Film Board of Canada.

== Production ==
In his 1974 history of the CGMPB published by the Canadian Film Institute, Charles Backhouse wrote that, "With enthusiasm the Bureau began the mammoth task of preparing its first major sound production, an epic 10-reel history of the Canadian armed forces in World War I. Entitled Lest We Forget, the film was produced by the Bureau, but with considerable help in research and scripting from a committee appointed by the Ministry of National Defence. Sequences were taken from the material Lord Beaverbrook had stored in the Imperial War Museum (in London, England), and purchases or loans of other wartime footage were negotiated with foreign governments, newsreel companies and film production houses throughout the world. A total of some two million reels of film was collected and finally reduced to 10 reels, with a running time of an hour-and-a-half. Lest We Forget was released in Ottawa in 1935, and drew intense criticism despite its commercial success. Despite denouncement by influential papers including the Ottawa Citizen, the film held a public run of over a year, earning $34,000, not adjusted for inflation. Sir George Perley, speaker of the House of Parliament, adjourned the body early in order that members might attend the gala showing. (Ottawa Journal, 5 March 1935)"
