= Travelogue (TV program) =

Chinese TV series (2003–)

- Starring: Marc Edwards; Michele Lean; Tianran He; KayLi Lum; Gareth Edwards
- Country of origin: China
- No. of episodes: 100+

Production
- Running time: 30 minutes

Original release
- Network: CCTV-9; CCTV International; CCTV News
- Release: 2003 – present

Travelogue is an adventure tourism television program produced by China Central Television. Each episode features a host who travels with a camera crew to a new destination in China or around the globe and experiences the sights, sounds, and culture that the location has to offer.

The program frequently takes viewers beyond well-known tourist spots to provide a more authentic and in-depth look at local culture. Presenters often immerse themselves in the local and traditional culture wherever they visit. They address the audience directly, acting as tourists-turned-tour guides, and are also filmed interacting with locals and discovering interesting locations in largely unrehearsed sequences.

== Destinations ==
The show has taken viewers to all the best destinations in China, as well as Jamaica, Greece, Malaysia, Singapore, Namibia, Hong Kong and Taiwan.

In 2007, Travelogue filmed a 3-part edition in conjunction with National Geographic's Trends Traveller magazine. They travelled by car along the fabled Tea and Horse Trail, from Lijiang in Yunnan to Lhasa in Tibet.

Travelogue produced the Being Beijing miniseries which aired throughout the 2008 Summer Olympics in Beijing highlighting the best things to do, see and eat in the city for those attending the event.

Aside from the successful "Being Beijing" miniseries, Travelogue produced a "History Special", which focused on cities around China that had significance on all of the Chinese dynasties. Other editions were "Street Special," which focused on the streets of different cities around China, and the "Ethnic Odyssey," which focused on the regions of China that were the lands of the various ethnic groups of China.

In 2009 Travelogue produced CCTV News' first-ever travel program in Taiwan where they toured the island for three weeks. The five-part edition was the 1st major travel program filmed between the mainland and Taiwan.

After producing a few successful travel editions on Qingdao in 2010, Shangri-La, and Xinjiang, In 2011, Travelogue continued to produce an eight-part edition covering the whole of Hainan Island.

== Presenters ==
- Tianran He
- Eva May
- Megan Zhang
