= Carry on, Sergeant! =

1928 Canadian war drama film

- Directed by: Bruce Bairnsfather
- Written by: Bruce Bairnsfather
- Produced by: Bruce Bairnsfather
- Starring: Hugh Buckler; Jimmie Savo; Nancy Ann Hargreaves; Louise Cardi
- Cinematography: Bert Cann
- Edited by: Bruce Bairnsfather & Bert Cann
- Music by: Ernest Dainty
- Release date: November 10, 1928
- Running time: 117 minutes
- Country: Canada
- Language: English (silent)

Carry On, Sergeant! is a 1928 Canadian World War I drama, and is considered to be one of the earliest Canadian feature-length motion pictures. Costing CA$500,000 (equivalent to $9,021,978 in 2025) to make, it certainly was the most expensive.

== Plot ==
Carry On, Sergeant! is the story of four friends who join the army to fight in the First World War. After years of trench warfare, one of the men (Hugh Buckler) meets a French woman (Louise Cardi) working the taverns. He sleeps with her, but is overcome with guilt and is later killed in battle. His wife (Nancy Ann Hargreaves) back home believes he died a hero and remembers him with love. This sentimental film, which doesn't back away from the unpleasant – it was harshly criticized for the affair between a Canadian soldier and a 'prostitute' – was released at the end of the silent era and after only a brief theatrical run it disappeared from view. It was revived in the 1970s when the National Archives of Canada struck a new print.

== Cast ==
- Hugh Buckler - Bob Mackay
- Jimmie Savo - Syd Small
- W. T. Stewart - James Cameron
- Nancy Ann Hargreaves - Ruth
- Niles Welch - Donald Cameron
- Brenda Bond - Barbara Sinclair
- Monroe Owsley - Leonard Sinclair
- Lewis Dayton - Ralph Moran
- Laura O'Hara - Mme. Voisin
- Charles Esdale - Colonel Halstead
- Donald Hall - Colonel Markham
- Louise Cardi - Marthe

== Release ==
The film premiered on 10 November 1928, in the Regent Theatre in Toronto.

== Works cited ==
- Seiler, Robert (2013). Reel Time: Movie Exhibitors and Movie Audiences In Prairie Canada, 1896 to 1986. Athabasca University Press. ISBN 9781926836997.
