= Not My Department =

- Starring: Harry Ditson; Shelley Peterson
- Country of origin: Canada
- Original language: English
- No. of seasons: 1
- No. of episodes: 6

Production
- Running time: 30 minutes

Original release
- Network: CBC Television
- Release: October 2 – November 14, 1987

Not My Department is a Canadian television sitcom that aired on CBC Television in 1987. The show lasted only a single season. Based on Charles Gordon's comedic novel The Governor General's Bunny Hop, the show was essentially an attempt to create a Canadian version of the British sitcom Yes Minister. Prior to its premiere, its original working title was Welcome to Ottawa.

The series starred Harry Ditson as Gerald Angstrum and Shelley Peterson as Margaret Simmons, civil servants in Ottawa working for the Department of Regional Incentive Targets, a government ministry whose sole job was to inherit files that other government ministries did not want to deal with. Robbie O'Neill appeared as Robert, a junior assistant whose distinguishing trait was that he had learned French from watching Bleu Nuit, resulting in him saying things like "You must be hot in all those clothes" in bilingual meetings; Alpha Boucher appeared as Henri, the blunt-talking operator of the chip stand outside the department office. The cast also included Barry Stevens, Pierre Chagnon, Chris Wiggins, Robert Benson, Bonnie Brooks, James Edmond and Suzanne Coy.

Peterson was the wife of then-Premier of Ontario David Peterson. (Long after the series ended, a few media references mistakenly claimed that David Peterson made a bit part appearance on the series in the role of a janitor, although in reality this occurred on Shelley Peterson's later series Dog House.)

The series premiered on October 2, 1987, on CBC Television's owned-and-operated stations, although some private affiliates aired it in an alternate time slot or failed to carry it at all. Its debut episode attracted 743,000 viewers, but critical reviews were highly unfavourable and the show almost immediately dropped fully a third of its initial audience, with just 498,000 viewers in the second week. The CBC cancelled the series on November 14, 1987, after just six episodes had aired.
