= Charles William Gordon =

Charles William Gordon may refer to:

- Charles William Gordon (1860–1937), Canadian novelist who used the pen name Ralph Connor
- Charles William Gordon, (1940–present), his grandson
- Charles William Gordon (MP) (1817–1863), British Conservative politician
