= Taking Off (soundtrack) =

Soundtrack album
- Released: 1971

Taking Off is the soundtrack to the 1971 movie Taking Off directed by Miloš Forman and starring Lynn Carlin, Buck Henry and Georgia Engel. It includes two future artists in brief appearances: Kathy Bates (listed as Bobo Bates in the credits) and Carly Simon, both as auditioning singers. Bates sings "And Even The Horses Had Wings" and Simon sings "Long Term Physical Effects". The album was published only on vinyl and is currently out of print and hard to obtain. Includes the songs by Ike and Tina Turner and the infamous Mary Mitchell performance of "Ode to a Screw."

== Track listing ==
- "Taking off (I Believe in Love)" (Nina Hart) – 2:17
- "Fields of Green and Gold" – 1:40
- "Let's Get a Little Sentimental/Sosaloosa" (Mike Leander/Eddie Seago) – 2:22
- "And Even the Horses Had Wings" (Kathy "Bobo" Bates) – 3:39
- "Long Term Physical Effects" (Carly Simon/ Tim Sauders) – 1:54
- "Ode to a Screw" sung by Mary(Jenifer)Mitchell (Tom Eyen/ Peter Cornell) – 1:35
- "Stabat Mater Opus 58" – 2:54
- "Lessons in Love" (Catherine Heriza) – 2:35
- "Nocturne" – 2:38
- "Goodbye, So Long" (Tina Turner/Ike Turner) – 3:07
- "Air" (Performed by The Incredible String Band, Composed by Mike Heron) – 3:10
- "He's Got the Whole World in His Hands" – 1:50
- "Stranger in Paradise" – :49
- "Feeling Sort of Nice" (Shellen Lubin) – 1:59
