= Alpha Boucher =

Canadian actor (1943–2020)

- Born: 14 November 1943; Edmundston, New Brunswick, Canada
- Died: 14 December 2020 (aged 77); Lévis, Quebec, Canada
- Occupation: Actor

Alpha Boucher (14 November 1943 – 14 December 2020) was a Canadian actor.

== Biography ==
Boucher was accepted into the Conservatoire de Québec in 1961 alongside his friend, Jean-Yves Gaudreault. He graduated in 1965.

Alpha Boucher died in Lévis on 14 December 2020 at the age of 77.

== Filmography ==
- Moi et l'autre (1966)
- Sol et Gobelet (1968)
- La Paradis terrestre (1968)
- Quelle famille! (1969)
- Mont-Joye (1970)
- Les Berger (1970)
- Symphorien (1970)
- Hold on to Daddy's Ears (Tiens-toi bien après les oreilles à papa) - 1971
- L'Amour en communauté (1971)
- Comme tout le monde (1972)
- Les Forges de Saint-Maurice (1973)
- Pris au collet (1974)
- Bingo (1974)
- Les Beaux Dimanches (1974)
- La Petite Patrie (1974)
- Y'a pas de problème (1975)
- The Winner (1975)
- Don't Push It (Pousse mais pousse égal) - 1975
- Les As (1977)
- Les Brillant (1980)
- Boogie-woogie 47 (1980)
- Scandale (1982)
- Lucien Brouillard (1983)
- Terre humaine (1983)
- Entre chien et loup (1984)
- Semi-détaché (1987)
- Not My Department (1987)
- Celui qui l'dit, c'est lui qui l'est ! (1992)
- Alys Robi (1995)
- Sous le signe du lion (1997)
