= Barry Flatman =

Canadian actor

- Born: Montreal, Quebec, Canada
- Occupation: Actor
- Years active: 1976–present

Barry Flatman is a Canadian actor.

== Career ==
He began his career as a member of the comedy troupe Homemade Theatre Company, with whom he appeared on the CBC Television sketch comedy series Stay Tuned (1976–1977).

Flatman later became a regular cast member on the CTV and Showtime sketch comedy series Bizarre (1980–1986). Following Stay Tuned and Bizarre, Flatman had supporting roles in the films The Dead Zone (1983) and Switching Channels (1988), and had a main role as Bob Quimby on the CHCH series Ramona (1988–1989).

During the 1990s, he notably voiced Marvel Comics characters Vindicator and Henry Peter Gyrich on multiple episodes of the Fox Kids animated series X-Men (1992–1997). Flatman also had a recurring role as President Daniel Thompson on the CTV and NewNet series Earth: Final Conflict (1998–2000), and had a supporting role in the comedy film The Cutting Edge (1992). In 1995, Flatman had a supporting role in the television film Almost Golden: The Jessica Savitch Story. He played the role of Richard Taylor, which was based on newsanchor Mort Crim.

In the 2000s,he had a supporting role in the Italian film My Name Is Tanino (2002). Flatman most notably had supporting roles in the comedy film Just Friends (2005) and the horror film Saw III (2006). He also had main roles as Cam Ritchie in the CBC miniseries H2O (2004) and Chuck Beeter in the A&E miniseries The Andromeda Strain (2008), and a recurring role as Police Captain Bill Carruthers on the ESPN series Tilt (2005). In the 2010s, Flatman had supporting roles in the films The Returned (2013) and No Stranger Than Love (2015). He portrayed Darryl F. Zanuck in the Lifetime biographical miniseries The Secret Life of Marilyn Monroe (2015), and had recurring roles as Wally Semenchko on season 1 of the FX anthology series Fargo (2014) and Don Shade on the Global series Private Eyes (2016–2021).

From 2016 to 2021, Flatman had a recurring role as Don Shade on the Global television series Private Eyes. In 2023, he appeared on stage as Jonas in Jonas & Barry in the Home.

== Filmography ==
=== Film ===
Barry Flatman film credits
Year	Title	Role	Notes
1981	Threshold	Reporter #1	
1983	The Dead Zone	Walt Bracknell	
1983	Spasms	Reporter	
1987	Taking Care	Tom Moore	
1988	Switching Channels	Zaks	
1988	A New Life	Suitor #2	
1988	Short Circuit 2	Robotic Company C.E.O.	
1988	Lonely Knights	Walter	
1989	Physical Evidence	Brody	
1989	The Dream Team	Arrogant Yuppie	
1990	Falling Over Backwards	Arthur	
1991	Charlie's Ear	Mr. Watson	
1992	The Cutting Edge	Rick Tuttle	
1994	The Paperboy	Mr. McFarley	
1995	Open Season	Kerwin Keesler	
1996	Terminal Justice	Phillips	
1997	The Wrong Guy	Crime Show Host	
1998	Random Encounter	Blake Preston	
1999	The Witness Files	Frank Sutton	
2000	Cruel Intentions 2	Headmaster Sherman	
2001	High Adventure	Jack Gates	
2001	Death, Deceit and Destiny Aboard the Orient Express	Reid Archer	
2001	True Blue	Kenner	
2002	The Circle	Mr. Harlow	
2002	My Name Is Tanino	Mr. Garfield	
2002	The Pirate's Curse	The Colonel	
2004	Run Away Home	Doctor Gordon	
2005	The Last Sign	Al	
2005	Just Friends	Mr. Palamino	
2006	Saw III	Judge Halden	
2013	The Returned	Dave	
2014	Patch Town	Executive #1	
2014	Dr. Cabbie	Andrew Hill	
2015	No Stranger Than Love	Elliot Sherrington	
2015	The Hexecutioners	Mr. Winston	
2016	Chokeslam	Malcolm	
2022	The Protector	The Protector (voice)	

=== Television ===
Barry Flatman television credits
Year	Title	Role	Notes
1976–1977	Stay Tuned	Various characters	Recurring role (as part of Homemade Theatre Company)
1977	Homemade Television	Various characters	Episode: "Work Day"
1980–1986	Bizarre	Various characters	Regular cast member
1981	The Great Detective	Terence Whiting	2 episodes
1983	Moving Targets	Jameson	Television film
1984	Full Circle Again	Ed Parkes	Television film
1984	The Littlest Hobo	Coach Hart	Episode: "Second Best"
1984, 1987	Seeing Things	Castro / Tom Riordan	2 episodes
1985	Reckless Disregard	Jeremy Kreiger	Television film
1985	Murder in Space	Roarke	Television film
1985	The Ray Bradbury Theater	Robert Peerless	Episode: "The Playground"
1985	Check It Out	Reggie	Episode: "...Or Get Off the Pot"
1986	A Deadly Business	Reporter #2	Television film
1986	Easy Prey	Wells	Television film
1986	The Magical World of Disney	Newsman at Basketball Game	Episode: "Young Again"
1987	Hangin' In	Frank	Episode: "Engagement in Thailand"
1987	CBS Schoolbreak Special	Mr. Moore	Episode: "The Day They Came to Arrest the Book"
1987	I'll Take Manhattan	George Peterson	Miniseries
1987	Captain Power and the Soldiers of the Future	Andy Jackson	Episode: "The Intruder"
1987, 1989	Street Legal	Jeremy Fellows / Green	2 episodes
1988	Alfred Hitchcock Presents	Bishop	Episode: "You'll Die Laughing"
1988	Diamonds	Howard Morrison	2 episodes
1988	War of the Worlds	Hewlit	Episode: "The Good Samaritan"
1988–1989	Ramona	Bob Quimby	10 episodes
1989	Sorry, Wrong Number	Dr. Levine	Television film
1989	Age-Old Friends	Peter	Television film
1990	My Secret Identity	Ted Macklin	Episode: "Secrets for Sale"
1990	Counterstrike	Halloway	Episode: "Prize Package"
1990–1991	Dog House	Ted Sheppard	2 episodes
1990–1993	E.N.G.	Various roles	3 episodes
1992	Counterstrike	Halloway	Episode: "Prize Package"
1992	Tropical Heat	Matt Grady	Episode: "Ocean Park"
1992	Secret Service	Boardman	Episode: "Blood Money / Fire and Ice"
1992–1997	X-Men: The Animated Series	Vindicator / Colonel / Henry Peter Gyrich (voice)	18 episodes
1993	Top Cops	Milt	Episode: "Craig Gravel and Jerry Jones"
1993	Tales from the Cryptkeeper	Additional voices (voice)	Episode: "Hyde and Go Shriek"
1994	Kung Fu: The Legend Continues	Jack Hawks	Episode: "Tournament"
1994	RoboCop	Simon Atwater	Episode: "Robocop vs. Commander Cash"
1994	TekWar	Marty Dollar	Episode: "Sellout"
1996	Taking the Falls	Sammy Watson	Episode: "Paying the Bill"
1997	End of Summer	Mr. Anderson	Television film
1997	When Innocence Is Lost	David Trask	Television film
1997	Any Mother's Son	Commander Stevens	Television film
1997	Joe Torre: Curveballs Along the Way	Mel Stottlemyre	Television film
1997	Traders	Seth Caldwell	Episode: "Emeritus No More"
1998	When He Didn't Come Home	Donald Blair	Television film
1998	Thanks of a Grateful Nation	Lt. Col. Nails	Television film
1998	Naked City: A Killer Christmas	Dr. Comsky	Television film
1998–2000	Earth: Final Conflict	Dr. Barrow / President Daniel Thompson	9 episodes
1999	The Wrong Girl	Jim Fisher	Television film
1999	The Return of Alex Kelly	Joe Kelly	Television film
1999	Coming Unglued	Gordon Cornell	Television film
1999	Dash and Lilly	Man on Train	Television film
1999	Ricky Nelson: Original Teen Idol	Charles Koppelman	Television film
1999	Strange Justice	Agent Allard	Television film
1999	Twice in a Lifetime	Nathaniel Canby	Episode: "O'er the Ramparts We Watched"
2000	Code Name: Eternity	Plaxico	Episode: "Tawrens"
2000	The Secret Adventures of Jules Verne	General Teddy Steele	Episode: "The Rocket's Red Glare"
2000	Someone Is Watching	Charles Jensen	Television film
2000	The Last Debate	Ned Cannon	Television film
2001	Leap Years	Alan the District Attorney	3 episodes
2001–2002	Doc	Wendell	2 episodes
2002	Rideau Hall	Stewart Collingwood	5 episodes
2002	Monk	John Fenimore	Episode: "Mr. Monk Takes a Vacation"
2002	Crossing the Line	Jerry Blackstone	Television film
2002	Hell on Heels: The Battle of Mary Kay	Dick Heath	Television film
2002	Master Spy: The Robert Hanssen Story	Leroy Wauck	Television film
2002	The Brady Bunch in the White House	News Reporter	Television film
2002–2003	Odyssey 5	Senator Brian Perry	5 episodes
2003	Blue Murder	Peter Watley	Episode: "Respect"
2003	Largo Winch	Warren Lindley	Episode: "Hot Property"
2003	Mayday	Bill Tansky - Co-Pilot	Episode: "Cutting Corners"
2003	The Elizabeth Smart Story	Marc Klaas	Television film
2003	Thoughtcrimes	David McAllister	Television film
2004	1-800-Missing	Chief Jack Sanderson	Episode: "Cop Out"
2004	Sue Thomas: F.B.Eye	Donald Jennings	Episode: "Adventures in Babysitting"
2004	H2O	Cam Ritchie	Miniseries
2004	Love Rules!	Michael's Father	Television film
2004	Saving Emily	Uncle Theo	Television film
2004	Perfect Strangers	Bernie Schneider	Television film
2005	Tilt	Police Captain Bill Carruthers	5 episodes
2005	Heritage Minutes	Ferguson	Episode: "Home from the Wars"
2005	A Killer Upstairs	David Jamison	Television film
2005	Child of Mine	Alvin	Television film
2006	This Is Wonderland	Bill Bauer	3 episodes
2006	The State Within	Governor Karpinski	2 episodes
2007	All the Good Ones Are Married	Jack	Television film
2007	The Company	Phillip Sweet	Miniseries
2008	ReGenesis	Samuel King	Episode: "Hearts and Minds"
2008	The Andromeda Strain	Charles "Chuck" Beeter	Miniseries
2008	The Border	Wes Felton	Episode: "Peak Oil"
2008	Guns	Sinclair Patterson	Miniseries
2008	Daniel's Daughter	Stewart Wallach	Television film
2009	Being Erica	Shawn	Episode: "The Unkindest Cut"
2009	Cra$h and Burn	Bull Clerk	Episode: "God Protect Us"
2010	Happy Town	Robert Ward	2 episodes
2011	The Kennedys	General Thomas Bennett	Miniseries
2011	Almost Heroes	Dirk Masters	Episode: "Terry and Peter vs. Their Hero"
2011	The Case for Christmas	Braxton Bennett	Television film
2012	The Firm	Judge Braun	Episode: "Chapter Nine"
2012	Secrets of Eden	Aaron Lance	Television film
2012	Copper	Mayor Charles Godfrey Gunther	Episode: "The Hudson River School"
2012	Haven	Judge Boone	Episode: "Double Jeopardy"
2012	Transporter: The Series	General Weigert	Episode: "The General's Daughter"
2013	Murdoch Mysteries	Guard	Episode: "A Study in Sherlock"
2013	Defiance	Colonel Galen Marsh	3 episodes
2014	Hannibal	Judge Davies	Episode: "Hassun"
2014	Fargo	Wally Semenchko	5 episodes
2014	Degrassi: The Next Generation	Judge Sanders	2 episodes
2014	The Strain	Flaxton (Regis CEO)	Episode: "Gone Smooth"
2014	Apple Mortgage Cake	Josh Kaye	Television film
2015	Gangland Undercover	John Dorsey	Episode: "Dangerous Game"
2015	The Secret Life of Marilyn Monroe	Darryl F. Zanuck	Miniseries
2016	Amber Alert	Chief Cross	Television film
2016	Hell on Wheels	Jack Nobels	3 episodes
2016–2021	Private Eyes	Don Shade	57 episodes
2017–2018	Taken	Bryan's Dad	3 episodes
2018	Good Witch	Don Pryce	Episode: "With This Ring"
2018	Imposters	Dick Jankowski	Episode: "That's Enough. Off You Go."
2018	Marrying Father Christmas	Thomas	Television film
2022	Transplant	Patrick Camby	Episode: "Rumination"
