= J. King Gordon =

Canadian cleric, diplomat, and academic (1900–1989)

The Reverend J. King Gordon CM
- Born: John King Gordon; 6 December 1900; Winnipeg, Manitoba, Canada
- Died: 24 February 1989 (aged 88); Ottawa, Ontario, Canada
- Political party: Co-operative Commonwealth Federation
- Spouse: Ruth Anderson (m. 1939)
- Children: Charles Gordon; Alison Gordon
- Parents: Ralph Connor; Helen King
- Awards: Pearson Medal of Peace (1980)

Ecclesiastical career
- Religion: Christianity
- Church: United Church of Canada
- Ordained: 1927

Academic background
- Education: University of Manitoba; The Queen's College, Oxford; Union Theological Seminary
- Influences: Ralph Connor; Percy Corbett; Reinhold Niebuhr; Harry F. Ward

Academic work
- Discipline: Political science; theology
- Sub-discipline: Christian ethics; international relations
- School or tradition: Christian socialism
- Institutions: United Theological College; University of Alberta

John King Gordon CM (1900–1989) was a Canadian Christian minister, editor, United Nations official, and academic.

== Biography ==
Gordon was born on 6 December 1900 in Winnipeg, Manitoba, the son of the novelist and future Presbyterian Church moderator Charles Gordon (known by the pen name "Ralph Connor") and his wife Helen King. One of his six sisters was the diplomat and educationalist Marjorie Gordon Smart. He received a Bachelor of Arts degree from the University of Manitoba in 1920. A Rhodes scholar, he studied at The Queen's College, Oxford, from 1920 to 1921. Ordained in 1927, he was a United Church of Canada minister in Manitoba. From 1931 to 1935, he was a professor of Christian ethics at the United Theological College in Montreal. He was dismissed from the college in 1934 because of his socialist views. In 1935, he became a travelling professor of Christian ethics, working for the church's Board of Evangelism and Social Service. He became the secretary of the Fellowship for a Christian Social Order the same year. He was also involved with the League for Social Reconstruction.

Gordon married Ruth Anderson in 1939. They had two children, the journalist Charles Gordon and the journalist and novelist Alison Gordon.

In 1933, Gordon was one of the authors of the Regina Manifesto and was involved in the Co-operative Commonwealth Federation. From 1944 to 1947, he was managing editor of The Nation magazine. From 1947 to 1950, he was the United Nations correspondent for the Canadian Broadcasting Corporation (CBC). From 1950 to 1962, he was the human rights and information officer for the United Nations Secretariat. He also served as president of the United Nations Association in Canada circa 1975.

From 1962 to 1967, he taught international relations at the University of Alberta. He also taught at the University of Ottawa for six years.

In 1977, he was made a Member of the Order of Canada. He was the 1980 recipient of the Pearson Medal of Peace for his work in peacekeeping. He received honorary doctorates from the Brandon University (1974), Carleton University (1977), the University of Winnipeg (1979), St. Francis Xavier University (1981), and the University of Manitoba (1981). He died of a stroke on 24 February 1989 in Ottawa, Ontario.

== See also ==
- Salem Bland
- Tommy Douglas
- F. R. Scott
