= James Wlcek =

American actor

- Born: February 22, 1964 (age 62); New York City, New York
- Occupations: Stage, film, television actor

James Wlcek (born February 22, 1964), sometimes credited as Jimmy Wlcek or Jim Wlcek, is an American actor born in New York City.

He began his acting career in 1986 with an episode of Tales from the Darkside. After his audition tape was sent to the producers of Ryan's Hope, he landed the role of Ben Shelby.

During the time he spent on Ryan's Hope he acted in the play Liars by Elliot Meyers directed by Shellen Lubin at the Producers Club Theatre. Eight months later, he was cast as Linc Lafferty on As the World Turns. In 1997 he got the role of Trent Malloy in a two-hour Walker, Texas Ranger movie called Sons of Thunder. The role became a recurring one for Jimmy, who went on to guest star in several more episodes of the long-running series. In 1999, a spin-off series called Sons of Thunder was created with Jimmy in one of the lead roles.

== Movies ==
- 2019 High Moon as Deputy Grant
- 2014 The Sector as Brennan
- 2013 Shadow on the Mesa (TV Movie) as Ranch Hand
- 2011 Love's Christmas Journey as Landowner
- 2009 Hydra as Bob Crick
- 2005 Don't Tell as Yale
- 2004 Little Black Book as Hockey Player
- 1996 Damien's Seed as Eric
- 1989 Steel Magnolias as Marshall Marmillion

== Television ==
- 2012 Blackout as Swat Commander
- 2003 The Division – "Extreme Action Figures" as Gym Owner
- 2002 JAG – "Odd Man Out" as Petty Officer Second Class Terrence Shaw
- 1999 Sons of Thunder as Trent Malloy
- 1998–1999 Walker, Texas Ranger as Trent Malloy
- 1997 L.A. Firefighters as The Big One
- 1996 Baywatch Nights – "Last Breath" as Clancy
- 1990–1992 As the World Turns as Lincoln 'Linc' Lafferty
- 1989–1990 One Life to Live as Jack Gibson
- 1987–1989 Ryan's Hope as Ben Shelby
- 1987 Tales from the Darkside – "The Swap" as Claude Altoose
