= Sons of Thunder (TV series) =

- Genre: Action; Crime; Police procedural
- Created by: Aaron Norris; Chuck Norris
- Starring: James Wlcek; Marco Sanchez; Dawn Maxey; Alan Autry
- Country of origin: United States
- Original language: English
- No. of seasons: 1
- No. of episodes: 6

Production
- Executive producers: Aaron Norris; Chuck Norris; Gordon T. Dawson
- Producer: Garry A. Brown
- Running time: 60 minutes
- Production companies: Norris Brothers Entertainment; CBS Productions

Original release
- Network: CBS
- Release: March 6 – April 17, 1999

Related
- Walker, Texas Ranger

Sons of Thunder is an American action crime drama television series created by Aaron and Chuck Norris that aired from March 6 to April 17, 1999, on CBS. It is a spin-off of Walker, Texas Ranger.

== Series overview ==
=== Pilot ===
The two-hour pilot, Sons of Thunder, was shown as episode 5.24 of Walker. This episode introduced the characters, childhood friends Dallas PD Detective Carlos Sandoval and Army sergeant Trent Malloy.

Trent Malloy returns home after his father, Walker's close friend Reverend Thunder Malloy, dies of a heart attack. He eventually chooses to quit the Army and stay in Texas. Meanwhile, Walker and his partner Trivette are tracking a serial cop killer who has Carlos on his list. Trent unintentionally becomes involved in the case when he saves Carlos's life, and helps Walker and Carlos take down the criminal.

=== Seasons 6 and 7 of Walker ===
During Seasons 6 and 7 of Walker, Carlos appeared in 15 episodes and Trent in 12 episodes. One of these episodes included a Hayes Cooper story in which both actors appeared in a dual role. During these episodes, Trent opens a martial arts dojo and a protection agency to help those who are too scared to go to the police or who the police can't help. Sometimes Carlos assists him with these cases, sometimes the pair helps Walker with his cases (which often involve personal issues), and sometimes Trent turns over a case to Walker when the job requires resources he can't provide.

=== The spin-off series ===
In 1999, the two characters were featured in a spin-off series, which only lasted six episodes. Carlos resigns from the police department after his partner is murdered by a serial killer, who was a failed police applicant. He teams up with Trent to find the assassin, and they later decide to form their own private investigation firm called Thunder Investigation.

== Cast ==
=== Main ===
- James Wlcek as Trent Malloy
- Marco Sanchez as Detective Carlos Sandoval
- Dawn Maxey as Kim Sutter
- Alan Autry as Butch McMann
- Shane Meier as Thomas "Tommy" Joseph Malloy

=== Recurring ===
- Chuck Norris as Ranger Cordell Walker
- Clarence Gilyard as Ranger James Trivette

== Cancellation ==
Sons of Thunder aired in the same timeslot as Walker, Texas Ranger (Saturdays at 10pm ET). Producers Chuck and Aaron Norris assumed that the show would be renewed but CBS passed, citing budget concerns.

== Episodes ==
| No. | Title | Directed by | Written by | Original release date | Prod. code |
|---|---|---|---|---|---|
| 1 | "Moment of Truth" | Bill L. Norton | Bob Gordon | March 6, 1999 | 001 |
| 2 | "Fighting Back" | Michael Preece | Genia Shipman | March 13, 1999 | 002 |
| 3 | "Daddy's Girl" | Christian I. Nyby II | Garry A. Brown | March 20, 1999 | 003 |
| 4 | "Lost and Found" | Christian I. Nyby II | Robin Madden | April 3, 1999 | 005 |
| 5 | "Underground" | John R. Leonetti | Bart Baker | April 10, 1999 | 004 |
| 6 | "Thunder by Your Side" | John R. Leonetti | Bob Gookin | April 17, 1999 | 006 |
