= Dog House (TV series) =

1990 Canadian comedy TV series

- Genre: Comedy
- Created by: Dan Gordon
- Starring: Shelley Peterson; Jaimz Woolvett
- Country of origin: Canada
- Original language: English
- No. of seasons: 1
- No. of episodes: 26

Production
- Executive producer: Jon Slan
- Producer: Richard Borchiver
- Running time: 30 minutes
- Production company: Paragon Entertainment Corporation

Original release
- Network: YTV; USA Network
- Release: 10 October 1990 – 1991

Dog House is a Canadian comedy television series broadcast by YTV in the 1990–91 season.

== Premise ==
During a car accident, a police detective's mind is swapped with the mind of Digby, his St Bernard dog partner on duty. Helen Underwood (Shelley Peterson), the officer's widowed sister-in-law, takes custody of Digby where he joins her children Annabelle (Valentina Cardinalli), Richie (Jaimz Woolvett) and Timmy (Jonathan Shapiro). Now inhabiting Digby's body, the detective is able to talk with the family.

== Episodes ==
No.	Title	Directed by	Written by	Original release date
TBA	"Pilot"	Unknown	Unknown	October 10, 1990
1	"Speak Digby Speak"	Unknown	Unknown	October 21, 1990
2	"The Furniture Show"	Unknown	Unknown	October 28, 1990
3	"Lost and Found"	Unknown	Unknown	November 4, 1990
4	"Going, Going, Gone"	Lee Bernhardi	Jonathan Gross	November 11, 1990
5	"A Dog and His Bone"	Unknown	Unknown	November 18, 1990
6	"Amazing Annabelle"	Unknown	Unknown	November 25, 1990
7	"The Cyrano Show"	Unknown	Unknown	December 2, 1990
8	"Ted Moves In"	Unknown	Unknown	December 9, 1990
9	"Helen's Date"	Unknown	Unknown	December 16, 1990
10	"The Great North American Camping Experience"	Unknown	Unknown	January 20, 1991
11	"Coming of Age"	Unknown	Unknown	January 27, 1991
12	"Rear Window"	Unknown	Unknown	February 3, 1991
13	"Ted Meats His Match"	Unknown	Unknown	February 10, 1991
14	"Spot Marks the Ex"	Unknown	Unknown	February 17, 1991
15	"A Matter of Trust"	Unknown	Unknown	February 24, 1991
16	"Dog Day Glickman"	Unknown	Unknown	March 3, 1991
17	"Uncle Digby's History"	Unknown	Unknown	March 10, 1991
18	"Obedience School"	Unknown	Unknown	March 17, 1991
19	"Iris' Cookies"	Unknown	Unknown	April 7, 1991
20	"Fear of Flying"	Unknown	Unknown	April 14, 1991
21	"Eye on Clearview"	Unknown	Unknown	April 21, 1991
22	"Risky Business"	Unknown	Unknown	April 28, 1991
23	"Digby's Secret Is Out"	Unknown	Unknown	May 5, 1991
24	"Bachelor Number Three"	Unknown	Unknown	May 12, 1991
25	"Rentsok"	Unknown	Unknown	May 19, 1991

Former Ontario premier David Peterson, whose wife portrayed series character Helen Underwood, appeared in a guest role on the series as a school janitor.

== Reception ==
David Hiltbrand of People panned the series, noting "[t]he humor is very forced. This pooch of a show arrived neutered." Tony Atherton of the Ottawa Citizen also derided the series as "a classically lame-brained TV situation without redeeming values". Greg Quill of the Toronto Star "contains not a whit of original thought nor anything resembling a line worthy of a giggle".

== DVD release ==
On 19 April 2016, Mill Creek Entertainment released Dog House – The Complete Series on DVD in Region 1.

== Reunion ==
On 1 March 2022, cast and crew members from Dog House reunited online, their first public appearance together in over three decades, to raise money for Literacy Central Vancouver Island. The reunion, organized by NUTFLAKES, a community-run video store in a church basement in Saskatoon, Saskatchewan, brought together series stars Shelley Peterson, Jaimz Woolvett, and Valentina Cardinalli, along with series regulars Barry Flatman and David Bronstein. Later in the program, production manager Noella Nesoly and animal trainer Mathilde de Cagny joined in.

During the event, participants discussed the unknown whereabouts of original cast member Jonathan Shapiro, the series' only leading actor besides the deceased Bodie (who played the talking dog, and the 'voice of Digby', the late Bruce Johnson), not to attend.

The reunion was precipitated by extensive media coverage, including interviews with Dog House star Valentina Cardinalli and event organizer Mark Kleiner on CBC Saskatchewan Weekend with Shauna Powers on 27 February 2022, and with Kleiner on CTV News Saskatoon with Jeff Rogstad on 28 Feb 2022.

To honour the reunion, Mayor Leonard Krog signed a mayoral proclamation on 24 February 2022 declaring 1 March 2022 "Dog House Day" in the city of Nanaimo.
