= The Last Debate =

2000 American television film

- VHS cover
- Genre: Political drama
- Based on: The Last Debate by Jim Lehrer
- Written by: Jon Maas
- Directed by: John Badham
- Starring: James Garner; Peter Gallagher; Audra McDonald; Marco Sanchez
- Music by: Arthur B. Rubinstein
- Country of origin: United States
- Original language: English

Production
- Executive producers: Diane Minter Lewis; Ridley Scott; Tony Scott
- Production location: Toronto
- Cinematography: Norayr Kasper
- Editor: Frank Morriss
- Running time: 96 minutes
- Production company: Scott Free Productions

Original release
- Network: Showtime
- Release: November 5, 2000

The Last Debate is a 2000 American political drama television film directed by John Badham and written by Jon Maas, based on the 1995 book by Jim Lehrer, and starring James Garner and Peter Gallagher. It aired on Showtime on November 5, 2000.

== Plot ==
A televised presidential debate has a conspiracy behind it.

== Cast ==
- James Garner as Mike Howley
- Peter Gallagher as Tom Chapman
- Audra McDonald as Barbara Manning
- Donna Murphy as Joan Naylor
- Marco Sanchez as Henry Ramirez
- Dorian Harewood as Brad Lily
- Michael Riley as Jack Turpin
- Bruce Gray as Governor Paul L. Greene
- Stephen Young as Richard Meredith
- Lawrence Dane as Sidney Robert Mulvane
- Djanet Sears as Nancy Dewey
- Peter Donaldson as Jeff Grayson
- John Badham as Don Beard
- Leslie Carlson as Pat Tubbs
- Maggie Huculak as Gwyn Garrison
- Martin Doyle as Jim Weaver
- Brenda Robins as Carol Reynolds
- Colin Fox as Joshua L. Simpson
- Judah Katz as Bob Lucas
- Robin Ward as Mark Southeran
- Don Ritchie as Church Hammond
- Nicky Guadagni as Sam Minter
- Patrice Goodman as Roz Weisberg
- Barry Flatman as Ned Cannon
- Shelley Peterson as Joyce Meredith
- Annabelle Torsein as Alison Meredith
- Lynn Vogt as Ellen Greene
- Eamon Zekkon as TV Director
- Barbara Gordon as Lorraine Hampstead
- Nancy Harewood as Bonnie Kerr
- Ann Marin as Female Reporter
- Vanessa Vaughan as Grace Dickins
- Doug Murray as Jeff Field
- Martin Roach as Room Service Waiter
- Denis Akiyama as TV Makeup Artist
- Bryan Renfro as Steve Harrington
- Sharron Matthews as Barbara Fan
- Chuck Campbell as Bartender

== Production ==
Filming took place in Toronto.
