= Walker, Texas Ranger =

American action crime television series (1993–2001)

- Genre: Action; Crime; Police procedural; Law procedural; Contemporary Western
- Created by: Albert S. Ruddy; Leslie Greif; Paul Haggis; Christopher Canaan
- Starring: Chuck Norris; Clarence Gilyard; Sheree J. Wilson; Gailard Sartain; Noble Willingham; Floyd Westerman; Jimmy Wlcek; Marco Sanchez; Judson Mills; Nia Peeples
- Theme music composer: Tirk Wilder; Jerrold Immel
- Opening theme: "Eyes of the Ranger" (composed by Tirk Wilder; performed by Chuck Norris)
- Composers: Richard Band; Peter Bernstein; Ray Bunch; Christopher Franke; Jerrold Immel; Kevin Kiner; Ron Ramin; Gary Stevan Scott; Christopher L. Stone
- Country of origin: United States
- Original language: English
- No. of seasons: 9
- No. of episodes: 203 (not incl. TV movie) (list of episodes)

Production
- Executive producers: Aaron Norris; Chuck Norris; John Ashley; Tom Blomquist; Gordon T. Dawson; Leslie Greif; Leonard Katzman; Frank Lupo; Lisa Clarkson Milillo; Andre Morgan; Albert S. Ruddy
- Producers: Calvin Clements Jr.; Gordon T. Dawson; Bob Gookin; Bruce Cervi; John Lansing; Rick Husky; Garry A. Brown; Mitchell Wayne Katzman; Lisa Clarkson Milillo; Terry D. Nelson; Rob Wright
- Camera setup: Single-camera; Super 16mm
- Running time: 43 minutes
- Production companies: Cannon Television (1993); Top Kick Productions (seasons 1–5); Norris Brothers Entertainment (seasons 6–9); The Ruddy/Greif Company; Columbia Pictures Television; CBS Productions

Original release
- Network: CBS
- Release: April 21, 1993 – May 19, 2001

Related
- Sons of Thunder; Walker

Walker, Texas Ranger is an American action crime television series created by Albert S. Ruddy, Leslie Greif, Paul Haggis and Christopher Canaan. It was inspired by the film Lone Wolf McQuade, with both the film and the series starring Chuck Norris as a member of the Texas Ranger Division. The show was produced by Cannon Television (1993), Top Kick Productions (seasons 1–5), Norris Brothers Entertainment (seasons 6–9), The Ruddy/Greif Company, Columbia Pictures Television and CBS Productions and premiered on CBS on April 21, 1993, with the first season consisting of three pilot episodes. Eight full seasons followed with new episodes airing from September 25, 1993, to May 19, 2001, and reruns continuing on CBS until July 28, 2001. It has been broadcast in over 100 countries and spawned a 2005 television film entitled Trial by Fire. The film ended on a cliffhanger, which was never resolved. DVD sets of all seasons have been released (with the three pilots packaged with the first regular season). At various times since 1997, reruns of the show have aired, in syndication, on the USA Network and Action in Canada. Reruns are currently seen on Legend, INSP, getTV, Pluto TV, Heroes & Icons, 10 Bold, Peacock, Up TV and Hulu.

The series was noted for its moralistic style. The main characters refrained from the use of drugs and participated in community service. Martial arts were displayed prominently as the primary tool of law enforcement and occasionally as a tool for Walker and company to reach out to the community.

A reboot entitled Walker, starring Jared Padalecki, debuted on The CW in 2021, where it ran for four seasons.

== Premise ==
The show was initially developed by executive producer Allison Moore and supervising producer J. Michael Straczynski when the series was still being produced by Cannon Television. While Straczynski had to depart to get his new series Babylon 5 on the air, executive producer David Moessinger remained to finish developing the series. The show is centered on Sergeant Cordell Walker (Norris), a Dallas–Fort Worth-based member of the Texas Rangers, a state-level bureau of investigation. Walker was raised by his paternal uncle, an American Indian named Ray Firewalker (Floyd Red Crow Westerman, pilot episode, season 1; Apesanahkwat, season 2). The surname is, possibly, a nod to the 1986 Norris film, Firewalker. Cordell, prior to joining the Rangers, served in the Marines' elite Recon unit during the Vietnam War. Both Cordell and Uncle Ray share the values characteristic of Wild West sheriffs.

His partner and best friend is James "Jimmy" Trivette (Clarence Gilyard), a former Dallas Cowboys player, "Go Long Trivette", who takes a more modern approach. Walker's young partner grew up in Baltimore and used football as his ticket to college education. He was dropped from the team after he tore up his shoulder in a major game, which led to his career in the Rangers (often making references to watching the Lone Ranger and how C.D. Parker mentored him as a rookie officer). Trivette also works inside the office using computers and cellular phones to collate information of the people who have been taken into custody.

Walker also works closely with (and shares a mutual attraction to) Alexandra "Alex" Cahill (Sheree J. Wilson), a Tarrant County Assistant District Attorney, who on occasion puts up a frown if Walker does not obtain results in time. He also gets advice on cases from C.D. Parker (Gailard Sartain, pilot season; Noble Willingham, seasons 1–7), a veteran Ranger (later inducted into the Texas Rangers Hall of Fame) who worked with Walker (and is the only character on the show to address Walker by his first name Cordell on a regular basis) until retiring to operate a small restaurant and bar called "CD's Bar and Grill", a restaurant widely known in the series for its chili. In season 7, two rookie Texas Rangers, Sydney Cooke (Nia Peeples) and Francis Gage (Judson Mills), are assigned under Walker and Trivette's command.

== Episodes ==
Season	Episodes	Originally released	
Season	Episodes	First released	Last released
1	4	April 21, 1993	May 1, 1993
2	24	September 25, 1993	May 21, 1994
3	25	September 24, 1994	May 13, 1995
4	26	September 23, 1995	May 18, 1996
5	27	September 21, 1996	May 17, 1997
6	25	September 27, 1997	May 16, 1998
7	23	September 26, 1998	May 22, 1999
8	25	September 25, 1999	May 20, 2000
9	24	October 7, 2000	May 19, 2001
Television film		October 16, 2005	

== Cast and characters ==
Name	Portrayed by	Occupation	Seasons								
Name	Portrayed by	Occupation	Pilot	1	2	3	4	5	6	7	8
Cordell Walker	Chuck Norris	Former US Marine; Texas Ranger; Martial Arts Instructor	Main								
James Trivette	Clarence Gilyard	Former Football Player; Texas Ranger	Main								
Alexandra Cahill	Sheree J. Wilson	Assistant District Attorney; Founder of the HOPE Foundation	Main								
CD Parker	Gailard Sartain	Former Texas Ranger; Ranger Hall of Famer; Bar Owner	Main								
CD Parker	Noble Willingham	Former Texas Ranger; Ranger Hall of Famer; Bar Owner		Main							
Raymond Firewalker	Floyd Westerman	Walker's Uncle	Main								
Raymond Firewalker	Apesanahkwat	Walker's Uncle			Guest						
Trent Malloy	Jimmy Wlcek	Army Drill Instructor; Karate Instructor; Private Investigator					Recurring		Main		
Carlos Sandoval	Marco Sanchez	Police Detective					Recurring		Main		
Francis Gage	Judson Mills	Texas Ranger								Main	
Sydney Cooke	Nia Peeples	Texas Ranger								Main	

=== Main ===
- Chuck Norris as Texas Ranger Sergeant Cordell Walker, a former Marine and a modern-day Ranger who believes in the Code of the Old West. He is a decorated Vietnam vet and a martial arts expert, who also runs a martial arts program called 'Kick Drugs Out of America'. He is half-Cherokee and half-Irish. As a child in Oklahoma, his parents were murdered by White supremacists. He wound up living on the Cherokee Reservation with his Uncle Ray, where he was trained to use his instincts and learned to hunt game and catch rattlesnakes. He is the show's main protagonist. Norris also portrays Hayes Cooper, a 19th-century lawman whom Walker admired, who went from a career bounty hunter to Texas Ranger with connections to various Indian tribes in the West.
- Clarence Gilyard as Texas Ranger Sergeant James "Jimmy" Trivette, Walker's partner and best friend. He is a former professional football player for the Dallas Cowboys where he was a wide receiver and a trained boxer. After suffering an injury in the NFL, he joined the Dallas PD. His first encounter with Walker was when he saved him from a group of rioters. He made the Rangers with his impressive arrest record.
- Sheree J. Wilson as Tarrant County Assistant D.A. Alexandra "Alex" Cahill, whom Walker later dates for a few seasons and finally marries. Aside from her work as a lawyer, she also runs a non-profit organization to assist troublesome teens called the H.O.P.E. (Help Our People Excel) Foundation.
- Gailard Sartain (pilot) and Noble Willingham (seasons 1–8) as retired Texas Ranger Captain C.D. Parker, Walker's buddy and ex-partner who owns a bar-restaurant in Fort Worth, Texas, and is the only one to address Walker by his first name Cordell regularly. Despite being retired, he regularly assists Walker and Trivette. At the end of season 4, he was inducted into the Ranger Hall of Fame. C.D. was written out midway the eighth season (due to Willingham leaving the show to run for Congress), with it said that he is on a cruise around the world, which leaves him unable to attend Walker and Alex's wedding. He later unexpectedly dies off-screen early in the final season while on a fishing trip, presumably of a heart attack, but the series finale ultimately reveals that C.D. was murdered by ricin poisoning by Emile Lavocat, as the start of a revenge plot against the Company B Texas Rangers.
- Floyd Westerman (pilot season & season 1) and Apesanahkwat (guest season 2) as Walker's paternal uncle Ray Firewalker, also known as Uncle Ray. He raised Cordell after his parents—John and Elizabeth Firewalker—were murdered. Ray disappears at the end of the second season and is later revealed to have died during the sixth-season episode "Lucas".
- Jimmy Wlcek as Trent Malloy (recurring seasons 5–6; main season 7), eldest son of late pastor Thunder Malloy and a former martial arts student of Walker. He is a black belt in Karate, in which during his time in the Army, trained recruits, and runs both his own Dojo and Protection Agency. He refuses to carry a gun after a childhood accident that got his kid brother killed. He also often teams up with Walker and Trivette on cases.
- Marco Sanchez as Detective Carlos Sandoval (recurring seasons 5–6; main season 7), a detective for Dallas PD, and the best friend of Trent Malloy. He often teams up with Walker and Trivette on cases. At first Carlos lacked in hand-to-hand training until Trent gave him some pointers in the sixth-season episode "Undercover".
- Judson Mills as Texas Ranger Francis Gage (seasons 8–9), a rookie Ranger who joins Walker in the series' eighth season who is partnered with Sydney. He is trained in hand-to-hand combat and shown to be somewhat of a womanizer.
- Nia Peeples as Texas Ranger Sydney Cooke (seasons 8–9), another rookie Ranger who joins Walker in the series' eighth season who is partnered with Gage. She is trained in hand-to-hand with excellent cardio and keeps a level head, unlike Gage.

=== Recurring ===
- John Amos ("Sons of Thunder") and Paul Winfield ("The Soul of Winter") as Roscoe Jones, the father of Adam Jones and the minister who replaced Trent Malloy's late father, Thunder Malloy, as pastor of the First Christian Church of Dallas. His son, Adam, is the best friend of Trent's younger brother, Tommy. He'd been honorably discharged a year after Thunder was, but they'd also had a brush with a white supremacist by the name of Stan Gorman, who went on to become the leader of a neo-Nazi organization known as the Sons of the Reich.
- Michael Beck as Adam McGuire, a former IRA terrorist who now seeks peace for Northern Ireland. He is under constant threat by his former comrades and has a daughter, Jennifer, who is suffering from leukemia and is in need of a bone marrow transplant.
- Tobin Bell as Karl Storm, a dangerous arms dealer who plotted revenge against Alex, another attorney, and two police detectives, for taking him down five years prior, by hitting them at a wedding. He shot Alex and put her in a coma, when the bullet was intended for Walker, just before Walker was going to propose to her. Walker later killed Storm in a fight, in which Storm fell onto his own knife.
- Eloy Casados as Sheriff Sam Coyote, the sheriff of the Cherokee reservation in Oklahoma and a childhood friend of Walkers.
- Julio Cesar Cedillo as Ernesto Lopez, a former gangbanger who turned his life around and joined the Marines. He was almost killed by his former gang in order to provoke his younger brother, Tommy, in joining to provoke a gangland war. After he was accused of rape and exonerated, he was murdered by rogue Brookdale PD cops who assumed he beat the system unfairly only to discover he was innocent.
- Tony Denison as Michael Westmoreland, an ex-CIA operative working as a contract killer along with his girlfriend, Dierdre Harris, who is ex-CIA as well. He disguises his target hits as a string of serial killings, in which eleven unaffiliated targets are killed as well, and his weapon of choice are knives made from dry ice, so that no murder weapon would be recovered. He was hired by Johnson Carter to kill Alex as her wedding was approaching in order to escape prosecution. He failed to kill her and almost killed her father Gordon in the process. Carter, who was threatened by Walker, attempted to call off the hit, but Westmoreland refused to cancel the contract; however, he agreed to an extension if Walker was killed first. When Dierdre was killed attempting to kill Walker, he plotted revenge. After Carter was prosecuted and Walker and Alex was wedded, he killed a flight attendant and stole a uniform in which he was plotted to kill them both on the flight to Paris. He was killed with his own gun by Walker, but not before killing the pilots, leaving Walker to land the plane.
- Cynthia Dorn as M.E. Mary Williams, a medical examiner in most of the murder cases that occurred on the show.
- James Drury as Texas Ranger Captain Tom Price, Walker's and Trivette's supervisor. He only appears during the pilot season.
- Efrain Figueroa as Jesse Rodriguez, a Mexican Federale who assisted Walker in taking down an assassin plotting to kill Mexican Presidential Candidate Rafael Mendoza as well as saving illegal immigrants from smugglers who promise them a better life but instead put them through slavery.
- Robert Fuller as Ranger Wade Harper, a retired El Paso Texas Ranger who came on board to work for Walker and Trivette in taking down violent jewelry store thieves after his daughter was shot by them. He and his wife, Betsy, were killed by Lavocat's henchman, Robert Chastain, as revenge for his part in their incarceration. Previously, Robert Fuller appeared as another character—Cade Wallace, a 19th-century Texas Ranger—in one episode.
- Michael Ironside as Nolan 'The Chairman' Pierce, a mysterious man who ran a protection racket out of Chicago to assist Crime Bosses all over the country in dealing with Undercover federal agents within their organizations. After his clients were taken down by Walker, he attempted to draw Walker out using Alex as bait. He was killed when he attempted to disarm his bomb, only to accidentally set it off.
- Brion James as Rafer Cobbs, a vicious drug pin and fugitive Walker was hunting. He held a young boy, Lucas Simms, and his mother, captive, during which they had a secret key to a large sum of money. After breaking into Walker's house on his ranch, he was beaten and arrested by Walker.
- Terry Kiser as Charlie Brooks, a clumsy and fast-talking accountant and informant for Walker and Trivette. He was arrested in Utah after stealing money from his employer, who was a crime boss, and lost it in a bad stock deal. He was sentenced to 1000 hours of community service but managed to clear away the remaining time after assisting Walker and Trivette in taking down a heist crew when he learned his doppelgänger was an explosives expert for the heist.
- Jeff Kober as Kurt Nypo, a former karate champion-turned-drug runner who physically abuses his girlfriend while forcing her son to peddle his product for him.
- David Labiosa as Detective Sal Ochoa, a Dallas PD detective who assisted Walker and Trivette in various cases, from preventing a gang war, to clearing the name of a kickboxer accused of killing his trainer. His partner, Bill Sadler, was killed in Season 7 while taking down a heist crew stealing computers.
- Tammy Lauren as Ranger Roberta 'Bobby' Hunt, a former Brookdale PD officer who made the Texas Rangers to replace a Ranger that was killed in the line of duty. She is a single mother who was being hassled by her abusive ex-husband, Russell, and later assisted Walker and Trivette in taking down a mob boss who was putting his son through a series of abusive lessons.
- Stephen McHattie as Thomas "Mr. O" Openshaw, the mastermind of a series of grizzly murders in which wealthy folks are killed in their homes by intruders after their state-of-the-art security systems are disabled. The crew he hired to do the killings brought him a young woman who he raped and killed, which was caught on surveillance. He was later charged with the murder after Walker obtained his DNA sample, all the while Walker found a video of Mr. O committing rape and murder. While in court, he made contact with mercenaries to take down Walker and Alex's plane, whom ultimately failed after Trivette arrested two of his accomplices. He was later convicted for his crimes and is awaiting execution in Huntsville.
- Shane Thomas Meier as Thomas "Tommy" Joseph Malloy, Trent's younger brother who was subjected to bullying alongside his best friend, Adam Jones (the son of Pastor Roscoe Jones), he was later trained in Martial Arts by Trent and even competed in some events.
- Carliss Benson as Adam Jones, the son of Pastor Roscoe Jones and the best friend of Trent Malloy's younger brother, Tommy. Like Tommy, he, too, was picked on by bullies until he learned martial arts from Trent. He was a target for murder by the neo-Nazi organization the Sons of the Reich after the group mistakenly killed another boy whom he helped serve food baskets to needy families and then had to be sent away for protection after the organization almost kidnapped him and Tommy.
- John Haymes Newton as Joey Prado, a former kickboxing champion and protege to Walker who joined the Dallas PD afterwards and went undercover in taking down his childhood friend who plotted to distributed drugs into schools.
- Julia Nickson as Dr. Susan Lee, a geneticist who had been kidnapped three times throughout her appearances and the mother of Davey. Her father, Dr. Henry Lee, is a college professor.
- Sean Carberry as Davey Lee, the son of Susan Lee and grandson of Dr. Henry Lee and the reincarnation Lama Dolgin, a former master to the Buddhist monk Master Rin.
- John Fujioka as Master Rin, a Buddhist monk who takes Davey Lee under his wing.
- Peter Onorati as Sergeant Vincent Rosetti, a New York Police sergeant with a strong New York accent, and who is a little arrogant and assists Walker and his task force in taking down the mysterious Chairman.
- Haley Joel Osment as Lucas Simms, a young child who Walker rescued from vicious drug pin Rafer Cobbs. He is terminally ill with AIDS as is his mother, who died after being rescued. He was carrying a photo of him and his mother, which consisted of a key to an exorbitant amount of money. After Walker arrested Cobbs, Lucas finally succumbed to AIDS.
- Michael Parks as Caleb Hooks, a mercenary with Comanche blood who sought revenge against Walker after his brother was killed in a sting. He kidnapped Walker and put him through a series of deadly tests. He was later defeated and arrested, but later reemerged as he kidnapped Trivette and Alex and put Walker on a ghost hunt. He was later killed by Walker.
- Vanessa Paul as Josie Martin, who runs a 'H.O.P.E.' center created by Alex after a near-death experience. One of Alex's bridesmaids at Alex and Walker's wedding.
- Wayne Pere as Victor LaRue, one of Walker's archenemies who repeatedly kidnapped and tried to rape Alex until he was shot dead in his final appearance, "Trial of LaRue".
- Marco Perella as Cobalt, a former smuggler now a CI working for the Rangers. He fears Trivette after a past issue and is the one person he refuses to work with.
- Melinda Renna as Esperanza 'Marta' Lopez, a family friend to Walker and a restaurateur with her 2 sons, Ernesto and Tommy. She was raising her sons by herself due to the fact that her husband, Joe, went to prison for armed robbery, but was later paroled sometime after Ernesto was killed.
- Lisa Rotondi as Buzz Lee, a convicted computer hacker who was recruited into Walker's task force in bringing down the Chairman. She had an outstanding rivalry with Cro-Mag, now called the Wizard over the money that was stolen from her personal account. It was attempting to retrieve her stolen money that led to her incarceration. After the Chairman and his clients were taken down, she received a full pardon.
- Frank Salsedo as White Eagle, the spiritual leader of the Cherokee reservation in Oklahoma where Walker grew up on, who debuts during season 3.
- Robin Sachs as Phillippe Brouchard, an international assassin skilled in all forms of combat and a master of disguise. He was first seen attempting to assassinate Mexican presidential candidate Rafael Mendoza. He later led a team to hold Mendoza and others hostage at a charity event with a demand for the release of Ernesto Espinoza. Instead he murdered Espinoza as part of a contract from a rival cartel. He was later defeated and arrested by Walker.
- Rod Taylor as Gordon Cahill, the once-estranged father of Alex, who is also an Attorney.
- Marshall R. Teague as Emile Lavocat, the primary antagonist for the final season (his actor also portrayed other antagonists including the pilot episode's Orson Wade). A career criminal whose family legacy dates back to Moon Lavocat during the western era. He is a skilled sniper who led a violent heist crew, which was taken down by the Company B Texas Rangers. Years later, he escapes and staged a prison break at Huntsville to collect his crew in taking revenge against the 12 Rangers involved, he had already killed C.D. beforehand. He is killed when Walker unpins one of his grenades.
- T.J. Thyne as Wallace 'The Wizard' Slausen, a highly-skilled computer hacker once known as 'Cro-Mag' working for the Chairman in hacking the Governments mainframe in exposing federal agents embedded in criminal organizations. He was shot and left to die by the Chairman after he was discovered providing Walker's task force with information regarding the Chairman's clients. He soon died after the task force found him.
- Gwen Verdon as Maisie Whitman, an elderly lady whom C.D. was acquainted with. She was first seen pretending to have dementia when Parker was exposing corrupt doctors and orderlies at a retirement home who were using the elderly as guinea pigs in testing a banned Alzheimer's drug with fatal results to which she helped C.D. bring them down (as she was able to see through his cover and recognized his intent). C.D. later assisted her when her daughter-in-law killed her son in order to steal a trust fund from her family.
- Burt Young as Jack 'Soldier' Belmont, a homeless war veteran who is friends with Walker and suffers from PTSD. He was first seen witnessing an attack on a priest and later assisted Walker in finding two runaway children and protecting them from a sweatshop kingpin after they witnessed him kill one of his workers, to which he himself was almost killed as well. He is accompanied by his dog and faithful companion, Lucky.

=== Notable guest stars ===
Actor	Character	Episode title	Year
Marshall R. Teague	Orson Wade	"One Riot, One Ranger"	1993
Marshall R. Teague	Harper Ridland	"Payback"	1994
Marshall R. Teague	Randy Shrader	"Codename: Dragonfly"	1996
Marshall R. Teague	Rudd Kilgore	"Last of a Breed: Part 1" "Last of a Breed: Part 2"	1997
Marshall R. Teague	Lieutenant Tracton	"Fight or Die"	1999
Marshall R. Teague	Emile Lavocat/Milos "Moon" Lavocat	"The Final Showdown"	2001
Leon Rippy	Dewey Baker	"Borderline"	1993
Leon Rippy	Vince Pike	"Days Past"	1997
Leon Rippy	Robert Chastian	"The Final Show/Down"	2001
Richard Norton	Rollins	"Storm Warning"	1993
Richard Norton	Mercenary #1	"Standoff"	1995
Richard Norton	Simms	"Team Cherokee: Part 2"	1999
Richard Norton	Tom Munger	"Fight or Die"	1999
Richard Norton	Thug (uncredited)	"Wedding Bells: Part 1"	2000
Richard Norton	Frank Scanlon	"The Avenging Angel"	2000
Richard Norton	Jonas Graves/ 'flashbacks', Long-Haired Desperado	"The Final Showdown: Part 1" "The Final Showdown: Part 2"	2001
Luis Guzmán	Gomez	"Storm Warning"	1993
Patrick St. Esprit	Quint	"Crime Wave Dave"	1993
Patrick St. Esprit	Brad Furnell	"The Juggernaut"	1996
Patrick St. Esprit	Jack Garrett	"The Fighting McLains"	1997
Patrick St. Esprit	Lester Rawlins	"A Matter of Principle"	2000
Patrick St. Esprit	Darby	"Unsafe Speed"	2001
Larry Manetti	Hendrix	"End Run"	1993
Larry Manetti	Shelby	"livegirls.now"	1999
Larry Manetti	Shelby	"Black Dragons"	2000
Judith Hoag	Lainie Flanders	"Family Matters"	1993
Brian Thompson	Leo Cale	"Family Matters"	1993
M. C. Gainey	Tingley	"She'll Do to Ride the River With"	1993
M. C. Gainey	Craig	"The Bachelor Party"	2000
Sam J. Jones	Tommy Williams/Samuel Bodine	"Unfinished Business"	1993
Sam J. Jones	Mick Stanley	"Devil's Turf"	1997
Mary Elizabeth McGlynn	Merilee Summers	"Right Man Wrong Time"	1994
Giovanni Ribisi	Tony Kingston	"Something in the Shadows: Part 1" "Something in the Shadows: Part 2"	1994
Tom Virtue	Peter Needham	"Something in the Shadows: Part 1" "Something in the Shadows: Part 2"	1994
Jeff Kober	Kurt Nypo	"Something in the Shadows: Part 1" "Something in the Shadows: Part 2"	1994
Jeff Kober	Russell Stafford	"99th Ranger"	1997
Tobey Maguire	Duane Parsons	"The Prodigal Son"	1994
Danica McKellar	Laurie Maston	"Stolen Lullaby"	1994
Ray Wise	Garrett Carlson	"Stolen Lullaby"	1994
Carli Coleman	Georgia Douglas	"Silk Dreams"	1994
James Morrison	Ned Travis	"Mustangs"	1994
August Schellenberg	Billy Gray Wolf	"Rainbow Warrior"	1994
August Schellenberg	Billy Gray Wolf	"On Sacred Ground"	1995
Doris Roberts	Elaine Portugal	"The Big Bingo Bamboozle"	1995
Wayne Pere	Victor LaRue	"Cowboy"	1995
Wayne Pere	Victor LaRue	"The Return of LaRue"	1996
Wayne Pere	Victor LaRue	"Trial of LaRue"	1997
Wayne Pere	Cuadroza	"Last of a Breed: Part 1" "Last of a Breed: Part 2"	1997
Tim Thomerson	Mitchell Bolton	"War Zone"	1995
Dirk Benedict	Blair	"Case Closed"	1995
Robin Sachs	Philippe Brouchard	"Standoff"	1995
Andrew Divoff	Carlos Darius	"Deep Cover"	1995
Andrew Divoff	Rudy Mendoza	"Everyday Heroes"	1998
Andrew Divoff	Alberto Cardoza	"Winds of Change"	2000
Alex Cord	Larry Curtis	"The Guardians"	1995
Paul Williams	Tumbleweed Tom	"Collision Course"	1995
William Smith	Silas Quint	"Final Justice"	1995
Marshall Colt	Lt. Lee Corbin (his last acting role)	"Whitewater: Part 1"	1995
Carlos Machado	Himself	"Rodeo"	1996
Carlos Machado	Officer No. 1	"Sons of Thunder"	1997
Carlos Machado	Orderly	"Forgotten People"	1997
Carlos Machado	Rodgers	"Fight or Die"	1999
William Lucking	Capt. Shankley	"Break In"	1996
Anthony Zerbe	Joey Galloway	"Break In"	1996
Clifton Collins Jr.	Fito	"El Coyote: Part 1" "El Coyote: Part 2"	1996
Issabela Camil	Juanita Ortiz	"El Coyote: Part 1" "El Coyote: Part 2"	1996
Robert Englund	Lyle Eckert	"Deadline"	1996
Richard Chaves	Special Agent Samuel Mills	"Deadline"	1996
Stephen McHattie	Karl Mayes	"Redemption"	1996
Stephen McHattie	Thomas Openshaw	"In Harm's Way: Part 1" "In Harm's Way: Part 2"	1999
Rod Taylor	Gordon Cahill	"Redemption"	1996
Rod Taylor	Gordon Cahill	"Texas vs. Cahill"	1997
Rod Taylor	Gordon Cahill	"Wedding Bells: Part 1" "Wedding Bells: Part 2"	2000
Keith Szarabajka	Hendricks	"Redemption"	1996
Max Martini	Luke	"A Silent Cry"	1996
Burt Young	Jack Belmont	"Lucky"	1996
Burt Young	Jack Belmont	"Small Blessings"	1997
Kai Wulff	Steven "The Viper" Jamieson	"The Deadliest Man Alive"	1996
Kai Wulff	Cosmo Von Deusenberg	"Power Angels"	1999
Terry Kiser	Charlie Brooks	"Mayday" "Last Hope" "Iceman"	1997
Terry Kiser	Maxwell 'Iceman' Kronert	"Iceman"	1997
Mila Kunis	Pepper	"Last Hope"	1997
Jesse Corti	Drug Dealer	"Last Hope"	1997
Tammy Lauren	Roberta "Bobby" Hunt	"99th Ranger"	1997
Tammy Lauren	Roberta "Bobby" Hunt	"A Father's Image"	1997
Tonea Stewart	Judge Loretta Paxton	"Trial of LaRue"	1997
Tonea Stewart	Principal Rivers	"Rise to the Occasion"	1999
Mako	Dr. Henry Lee	"Heart of the Dragon"	1997
Mako	Edward Song	"Black Dragons"	2000
Kyla Pratt	Kyla Jarvis	"The Neighborhood"	1997
Joseph Ashton	Nicholas Matacio	"A Father's Image"	1997
Dan Lauria	Salvatore Matacio	"A Father's Image"	1997
John Amos	Pastor Roscoe Jones	"Sons of Thunder"	1997
Ed Bruce	Pastor Thunder Malloy	"Sons of Thunder"	1997
Tess Harper	Katie Malloy	"Sons of Thunder"	1997
Marco Sanchez	Detective Carlos Sandoval	"Sons of Thunder"-"Team Cherokee: Part 2"	1997-1999
Marco Sanchez	Sam Brazos	"Paradise Trail"	1998
James Wlcek	Trent Malloy	"Sons of Thunder"-"Team Cherokee: Part 2"	1997-1999
James Wlcek	Brother John Mason	"Paradise Trail"	1998
James Pickens Jr.	Staff Sergeant Luther Parrish	"The Fighting Mclains"	1997
Stephen Quadros	Corporal John Wesley 'JW' Mclain	"The Fighting Mclains"	1997
Haley Joel Osment	Lucas Simms	"Lucas: Part 1" "Lucas: Part 2"	1997
Mackenzie Phillips	Ellen Simms	"Lucas: Part 1" "Lucas: Part 2"	1997
Gwen Verdon	Maisie Whitman	"Forgotten People"	1997
Gwen Verdon	Maisie Whitman	"Mind Games"	1999
Robert Fuller	Ranger Cabe Wallace	"Last of a Breed: Part 2"	1997
Robert Fuller	Ranger Cabe Wallace	"The Final Show/Down"	2001
Robert Fuller	Ranger Wade Harper	"A Matter of Principle"	2000
Robert Fuller	Ranger Wade Harper	"The Final Show/Down"	2001
David Gallagher	Chad Morgan	"Brainchild"	1997
Paul Gleason	Dr. Harold Payton	"Brainchild"	1997
Clarence Williams III	Deputy Commissioner Luther Dobbs	"Mr. Justice"	1997
Clarence Williams III	Deputy Commissioner Luther Dobbs	"Angel"	1998
Lombardo Boyar	Luis "Flaco" Lopez	"Mr. Justice"	1997
Randolph Mantooth	James Lee Crown	"Rainbow's End"	1997
Barbara Bain	Mother Superior	"Saving Grace"	1998
Mitch Pileggi	Paul Gravis/Paul Grady	"Money Talks"	1998
"Rowdy" Roddy Piper	Cody "The Crusader" Conway	"The Crusader"	1998
Linda Purl	Barbara Conway	"The Crusader"	1998
Marty Ingels	Murray	"The Crusader"	1998
Randy Tallman	Dr. Aaron Markham	"The Crusader"	1998
Randy Tallman	Dr. Pratt	"Vision Quest"	2000
William Katt	Keith Portman	"Warriors"	1998
Grand L. Bush	Bishop Andros	"Angel"	1998
Grand L. Bush	Simon Trivette	"Brothers in Arms"	1999
Paul Winfield	Pastor Roscoe Jones	"The Soul of Winter"	1998
Collin Raye	Himself	"The Soul of Winter"	1998
Danny Trejo	Joe Lopez	"Circle of Life"	1998
Danny Trejo	Jose Rodriguez	"Rise to the Occasion"	1999
Kerry Rossall	Bad Guy	"Test of Faith"	1998
Kerry Rossall	Mace	"Brothers in Arms"	1999
Kerry Rossall	Joe Martin	"Rise to the Occasion"	1999
Tobin Bell	Karl Storm	"The Wedding: Part 1" "The Wedding: Part 2"	1998
RuPaul	Bob	"Royal Heist"	1998
Dean Norris	Deke Powell	"War Cry"	1998
Mike Connors	Judge Arthur McSpadden	"Code of the West"	1998
Amanda Fuller	Katie McSpadden	"Code of the West"	1998
Camilla Belle	Cindy Morgan	"Code of the West"	1998
Downtown Julie Brown	Cassandra	"The Children of Halloween"	1998
Erik Dellums	David "Lucifer" Thompson	"The Children of Halloween"	1998
Lila McCann	Kelly Wyman	"Eyes of a Ranger"	1998
Michael Peterson	Himself	"Eyes of a Ranger"	1998
Lee Majors	Sheriff Bell	"On the Border"	1998
Michael Fishman	Snake	"Lost Boys"	1999
Deion Sanders	Himself	"Special Witness"	1999
Deion Sanders	Himself	"Rise to the Occasion"	1999
Gary Busey	Donovan Riggs	"Special Witness"	1999
James Remar	Keith Bolt	"The Principal"	1999
Judy Herrera	Rachel Falcon	"Team Cherokee: Part 1" "Team Cherokee: Part 2"	1999
Michael Greyeyes	Brian Falcon	"Team Cherokee: Part 1" "Team Cherokee: Part 2"	1999
Robert Mirabal	Tall Bear	"Team Cherokee: Part 1" "Team Cherokee: Part 2"	1999
Lane Smith	Reverend Thornton Powers	"Power Angels"	1999
John Schneider	Jacob Crossland	"Jacob's Ladder"	1999
Dwight Schultz	Lloyd Allen	"Safe House"	1999
Rex Linn	Leland Stahl/Lester Stahl	"Way of the Warrior"	1999
Frank Stallone	B.J. Ronson	"Tall Cotton"	1999
Frank Stallone	Frank Bishop	"Saturday Night"	2001
Peggy and Patsy Lynn	Themselves	"The Lynn Sisters"	1999
Erik Estrada	Brock	"The Lynn Sisters"	1999
Joe Penny	Sonny Tantero	"Suspicious Minds"	1999
Barry Corbin	Ben Crowder	"Widowmaker"	1999
Ty Murray	Himself	"Widowmaker"	1999
Randy Savage	Whitelaw Lundren	"Fight or Die"	1999
Frank Shamrock	Dirk 'The Hammer' Savage	"Fight or Die"	1999
Steven Bauer	Lorenzo Cabral	"Rise to the Occasion"	1999
Scott Weinger	Bradley Roberts	"Full Recovery"	1999
Marla Adams	Betsy Harper	"A Matter of Principle"	2000
Marla Adams	Betsy Harper	"The Final Showdown"	2001
Tammy Townsend	Erika Carter	"Justice Delayed"	2000
Tammy Townsend	Erika Carter	"The Final Showdown"	2001
Jude Ciccolella	Samuel Becker	"Thunderhawk"	2000
Roger E. Mosley	Fred Carter	"Justice Delayed"	2000
David Keith	Cliff Eagleton	"The Day of Cleansing"	2000
Sammo Hung	Sammo Law	"The Day of Cleansing"	2000
Deron McBee	Luke Warley	"Black Dragons"	2000
Cary-Hiroyuki Tagawa	Master Ko	"Black Dragons"	2000
Byron Mann	P.K. Song	"Black Dragons"	2000
Mark Cuban	Himself	"Soldiers of Hate"	2000
Mark Cuban	Mark Smith (Groomsman)	"Wedding Bells: Part 1" "Wedding Bells: Part 2"	2000
Tzi Ma	General Nimh	"The General's Return"	2000
Barbara Mandrell	Nicole Foley	"Showdown at Casa Diablo: Part 1"	2000
Christopher B. Duncan	Defense Attorney Lime	"The Bachelor Party"	2000
Joan Jett	Dierdre Harris	"Wedding Bells: Part 1"	2000
Tom Bosley	Minister	"Wedding Bells: Part 1" "Wedding Bells: Part 2"	2000
Tony Denison	Michael Westmoreland	"Wedding Bells: Part 1" "Wedding Bells: Part 2"	2000
Ernest Borgnine	Eddie Ryan	"The Avenging Angel"	2000
Michael Ironside	Nolan "The Chairman" Pierce	"Winds of Change" "Lazarus" "Turning Point" "Retribution"	2000
Peter Onorati	NYPD Sgt. Vincent Rosetti	"Winds of Change" "Lazarus" "Turning Point" "Retribution"	2000
T. J. Thyne	Wallace 'The Wizard' Slausen	"Winds of Change" "Lazarus" "Turning Point" "Retribution"	2000
Jeffrey Dean Morgan	Jake Horbart	"Child of Hope"	2000
Dionne Warwick	Dionne Berry	"Faith"	2000
Mark Kiely	Dwight Burner	"Faith"	2000
Lee Arenberg	Lester Squigman	"Faith"	2000
Gerry Becker	Dr. Michaels	"Faith"	2000
Nicholas Gonzalez	Juan Guerrero	"Golden Boy"	2001
Hulk Hogan	Boomer Knight	"Division Street"	2001
Francis Capra	Ace	"Division Street"	2001
Tony Lo Bianco	Tony Ferrelli	"Saturday Night"	2001
John Mariano	Sonny Martone	"Saturday Night"	2001
Laura Bailey	Roberta Bishop	"Saturday Night"	2001
Brett Cullen	Pete Drayton	"Justice for All"	2001
Lawrence LeJohn	Moten	"Justice for All"	2001
Jonathan Adams	Lyle Nugent	"Justice for All"	2001
Beau Billingslea	Tom Jakes	"Justice for All"	2001
Nick Chinlund	Theodore McNeely	"6 Hours"	2001
Mercedes McNab	Heather Preston	"6 Hours"	2001
Daniel Hugh Kelly	Tim Preston	"6 Hours"	2001
Josh Holloway	Ben Wiley	"Medieval Crimes"	2001
Howard "California Flash" Jackson	Himself	"Legends"	2001
Joe Lewis	Himself	"Legends"	2001
Bill "Superfoot" Wallace	Himself	"Legends"	2001
Don "the Dragon" Wilson	Himself	"Legends"	2001
Steve "Sting" Borden	Grangus	"Unsafe Speed"	2001
Carlos Bernard	Raoul 'Skull' Hidalgo	"Without a Sound"	2001
Lloyd Battista	Dr. Clark	"Without a Sound"	2001
Peter Woodward	Victor Drake	"Blood Diamonds"	
Ryan Bittle	Harley	"Reel Rangers"	
Mitchel Musso	Josh Whitley	"Trial by Fire"	2005
Selena Gomez	Julie	"Trial by Fire"	2005

== Reception ==
=== Nielsen ratings ===
The show was quite successful in the ratings throughout its run, ranking among the top 25 shows from 1995 until 1999, and ranking in the Top 20 in both the 1995–1996 and 1998–1999 seasons.

- (1993–1994) 11.7 rating, No. 41
- (1994–1995) 11.2 rating, No. 41
- (1995–1996) 12.3 rating, No. 18
- (1996–1997) 11.0 rating, No. 24
- (1997–1998) 14.4 million viewers, No. 21
- (1998–1999) 14.4 million viewers, No. 15
- (1999–2000) 12.2 million viewers, No. 34
- (2000–2001) 10.3 million viewers, No. 62

=== Critical reception ===
In October 1993, Ken Tucker of Entertainment Weekly gave the series a C+.

Critic "Average Joe" Queenan thoroughly roasted the series, particularly over targeting a wider audience than suited for its late-night timeslot. He called the show "...so corny and predictable that it appears to be in slow-motion even when it's not...With plotlines that were old when George Burns was young, acting that makes William Shatner seem like Marlon Brando, and dialogue that could stop The Dukes of Hazzard dead in its tracks...Most episodes of the series are completely unwatchable—although, to the producers' credit, many are scripted so that Chuck Norris doesn't need to talk much...While Norris indeed has a number of successful and well-received screen projects under his belt, here is the first and only time I recall that he was trusted with performing his own theme music. He is no Roy Orbison...I'm not sure they're even using a DP on this show; it seems that they just mount a camera on a tripod and tell Chuck to start kicking people's faces in for a solid hour, which he seems more than willing to do."

=== Recognition ===
On December 2, 2010, Chuck Norris and his brother and series co-producer Aaron Norris were named Honorary Texas Ranger Captains by Rick Perry, the Governor of Texas, who said that "together, they helped elevate our Texas Rangers to truly mythical status."

== Home media ==
Paramount Home Entertainment and CBS Home Entertainment have both released all seasons on DVD in Region 1. The Complete 1st Season contains the three pilot episodes and the first full season being labeled as just the first season. This has confused some fans, as the episodes are wrongly numbered. Seasons 1–6 have been released in regions 2–4.

On May 12, 2015, CBS DVD released Walker, Texas Ranger – The Complete Collection on DVD in Region 1.

DVD name	Eps	Release dates		
DVD name	Eps	Region 1	Region 2	Region 4
The Complete 1st Season	26	June 13, 2006	October 2, 2006	October 12, 2006
The Complete 2nd Season	24	January 23, 2007	March 8, 2007	April 12, 2007
The Complete 3rd Season	26	June 12, 2007	December 4, 2007	January 10, 2008
The Complete 4th Season	26	February 19. 2008	May 28, 2008	July 31, 2008
The Complete 5th Season	25	July 1, 2008	October 21, 2008	October 2, 2008
The Complete 6th Season	23	January 13, 2009	February 19, 2009	March 5, 2009
The Complete 7th Season	25	March 9, 2010	N/A	March 3, 2011
The Complete Final Season	24	June 14, 2005	N/A	March 3, 2011
Walker, Texas Ranger: Trial by Fire	1	N/A	January 2, 2007	March 5, 2014

As of December 2023, the entire series is available digitally in the United States, available on both iTunes and Vudu, either as separate seasons or in a complete series set., as well as Google TV (and by extension YouTube TV) which are only sold as separate seasons. Unlike the DVD releases the seasons in the digital releases are correctly numbered.

As of 2023, Walker, Texas Ranger was remastered in high definition.

== Spin-offs and merchandise ==
=== Television films ===
CBS broadcast the television film Walker, Texas Ranger: Trial by Fire, produced by Paramount Network Television (now CBS Studios), on October 16, 2005. Chuck Norris, Sheree J. Wilson and Judson Mills reprised their roles, and Clarence Gilyard shot a cameo for the film but was not featured due to the filming's conflict with a long-planned family vacation. To fill the void, Judson Mills, who was not in the original script, returned to reprise the role of Francis Gage. Nia Peeples, who played the role of Sydney Cooke for seasons 7 and 8, was also not featured in Walker's return to prime-time television. The explanation given was that producers decided not to follow much of the original Walker, Texas Ranger series, as to give the film a fresh look. Even the show's original opening credits with the theme "Eyes of a Ranger" performed by Chuck Norris, was absent from the TV movie.

Although the return of Walker, Texas Ranger did not garner the ratings CBS had hoped for, indications were that CBS was green-lighting future Walker, Texas Ranger "movie of the week" projects. Trial by Fire ended with Sheree J. Wilson's character the victim of a courthouse shooting, leading many viewers to believe that there would be a follow-up movie. However, when CBS announced their fall 2006 prime-time schedule, they said that they would no longer be producing "Sunday Night Movie of the Week" projects, which severely impaired any hopes of Walker's return to television in the foreseeable future. On May 15, 2007, CBS announced its fall line-up, but this did not include the return of the "Sunday Night Movie of the Week". In June 2018, cast members Clarence Gilyard and Sheree J. Wilson expressed interest in reprising their roles in a potential revival of the series, particularly to address the cliffhanger at the end of the post-series film.

=== Spin-off ===
Most episodes were based on true stories. A short-lived series, Sons of Thunder, featured recurring character Carlos Sandoval, who resigns from his post with the Dallas police and teams up with childhood friend Trent Malloy (a protégé of Walker's), to start a private investigation firm.

=== Reboot ===
In September 2019, it was announced that a reboot of the series titled Walker was in development at CBS Television Studios from writer Anna Fricke, with Texas native Jared Padalecki attached to star. Fricke and Padalecki are also set to executive produce the project alongside Dan Lin and Lindsey Libertore from their production company Rideback, as well as Dan Spilo of Industry Entertainment. The CW, home of Padalecki's long-running series Supernatural, emerged as a leading contender to air the series in addition to CBS, which aired the original series. Like the original, the reboot, in which Walker would get a female partner, will explore morality, family, and rediscovering our lost common ground. The logline reads:

"At the center of the series is Cordell Walker (Padalecki), a man finding his way back to his family while investigating crime in the state's most elite unit. Our broken widower and father of two returns home to Austin after being undercover for two years for a high profile case—only to discover that there's even more work to be done at home. In a nod to the original series, Walker and his new partner—one of the only women in Texas Rangers' history—are the modern day heroes our world needs, following their own moral code to fight for what's right, regardless of the rules."

In October, it was announced that Walker would air on The CW. On January 14, 2020, it was announced that The CW had issued the reboot with a series order.

In February 2020, it was announced that Lindsey Morgan, Keegan Allen, Mitch Pileggi, Molly Hagan and Coby Bell were cast as Micki, Walker's female partner, Liam Walker, Walker's younger brother, Bonham Walker, Walker's father, Abeline Walker, Walker's mother and Captain Larry James, a Texas Ranger Captain. In March 2020, Jeff Pierre, Violet Brinson and Kale Culley were cast as Trey Barnett, an Army medic and Micki's boyfriend and Stella and August, Walker's teenage kids.

It premiered on January 21, 2021, and concluded on June 26, 2024, after four seasons.

A prequel series titled Walker: Independence premiered on October 6, 2022.

=== Novels ===
Three Walker, Texas Ranger books, written by James Reasoner, were published by Berkley Publishing Group in 1999. The books are now out of print.

- Walker, Texas Ranger (1998, ISBN 0-425-16815-8)
- Hell's Half Acre (1999, ISBN 0-425-16972-3)
- Siege on the Belle (1999, ISBN 0-425-17112-4)

=== In other media ===
The show has garnered a particular cult appreciation among Conan O'Brien fans, from one of his most popular segments called the "Walker Texas Ranger Lever". He explained since NBC had recently purchased Universal, he could now show clips from Walker, Texas Ranger without having to pay any money. The joke was that he would pull a giant red lever, causing a random and comically awkward scene to play. Random scenes included Walker jumping out of a plane and punching a woman in the face, or being shot in the back while proposing, or Haley Joel Osment playing a boy who is first meeting the rest of Walker's friends, and suddenly interjects "Walker told me I have AIDS". Conan would go on to riff at the bizarre nature of the scene out of context. He did this primarily on Late Night with Conan O'Brien, which prompted the show's star, Chuck Norris in character as Walker, to make a surprise guest appearance by acting out a skit in parody of the action scenes from Walker, Texas Ranger.

== Companies ==
The series began with Cannon Television, but after Cannon folded, CBS assumed production responsibilities and is currently the full owner for this series. Other companies as listed below have also been involved with the series production and/or distribution.

Production companies
Amadea Film Productions	TBD
Cannon Television	(1993)
Columbia Broadcasting System (CBS)	TBD
Columbia Pictures Television	(1993–2001)
Columbia TriStar Television	(2001)
The Ruddy-Greif Company	(1993–2001)
Top Kick Productions	(1993–1998)
Norris Brothers Entertainment	(1998–2005)
CBS Productions	(1995–2001)
CBS Entertainment Productions	(1993–1995)
CBS Broadcast International	(1993–2008)
Distributors
Warner Home Video	(1994–1995)
Columbia TriStar Television Distribution	(1997–2001)
Columbia TriStar Domestic Television	(2001–2002)
Mediaset, Canale 5	(1996) – Italy, TV (First TV)
Mediaset, Italia 1	(1997–2003) – Italy, TV (First TV)
Mediaset, Rete 4	(2002–2013) – Italy, TV (Reply)
Duel TV	(2003–2006) – Italy, TV (Reply)
FX	(2006–2011) – Italy, TV (Reply)
AXN	(2009–present) – Italy, TV (Reply)
Mediaset, Iris	(2015–present) – Italy, TV (Reply)
Paramount Home Entertainment	(2006–TBD), Germany, DVD
Paramount Home Entertainment	(2008, US, DVD, season 5)
Sony Pictures Television	(2002–2019, US only)
CBS Television Distribution	(2008–present, DVDs and international; US and worldwide since 2019)
TF1	2004, France, TV
TV2	(2000–2006), Hungary, TV
UFA Film- und Fernseh GmbH	1993, Germany, all media

== See also ==
- Walker, Texas Ranger 3: Deadly Reunion
- Diagnosis: Murder – A show starring Dick Van Dyke that also ran for eight seasons between 1993 and 2001
- Chuck Norris facts
