= Alison Gordon =

Canadian journalist and mystery novelist (1943 – 2015)

- Toronto Star staff photo
- Born: January 19, 1943; New York City, New York, US
- Died: February 12, 2015 (aged 72); Toronto, Ontario, Canada
- Education: Queen's University
- Occupations: Sportswriter; novelist
- Parent: J. King Gordon

Alison Ruth Gordon (January 1, 1943 – February 12, 2015) was a Canadian journalist and mystery novelist. She wrote for CBC and the Toronto Star in addition to a series of mystery novels.

== Early life and education ==
Gordon was born January 1, 1943, in New York City to John King Gordon (J. King Gordon) and his wife Ruth. She was the granddaughter of Canadian writer Ralph Connor and the sister of journalist Charles Gordon. She wrote the afterword for the New Canadian Library edition of Connor's novel The Man from Glengarry.

Because her father was a diplomat who worked with the United Nations, Gordon lived in numerous cities during her childhood, including Tokyo, Cairo, and Rome.

Gordon attended Queen's University in Kingston, Ontario, Canada, but left before completing a degree.

== Sports reporter ==
As a Toronto Star reporter, first assigned to cover the Toronto Blue Jays in 1979, she was one of Canada's first prominent women sportswriters. This made her the first woman doing sports coverage of the American League. At the time, women sportswriters were so rare that her membership card in the Baseball Writers' Association of America identified her as "Mr." Alison Gordon because the organization had made no provision for gender-neutral or female-specific cards. Gordon was also one of the first women allowed into a Major League Baseball locker room, which was controversial at the time but has since paved the way for many other female sports reporters.

She previously worked for the Canadian Broadcasting Corporation (CBC) in radio and television, including as a producer for As It Happens.

== Novelist ==
She later began publishing a series of murder mystery novels focusing on Kate Henry, a female sports reporter and amateur detective investigating murders in the professional baseball world.

== Death ==
Gordon died in the Toronto East General Hospital on February 12, 2015, at the age of 72.

== Works ==
=== Mystery ===
- The Dead Pull Hitter (1988)
- Safe at Home (1990)
- Night Game (1992)
- Striking Out (1995)
- Prairie Hardball (1997)

=== Non-fiction ===
- Foul Ball! Five Years in the American League (1984) (later revised and expanded version published as Foul Balls in 1986)
