= Sarah Binks =

- First edition (publ. Oxford University Press)
- Author: Paul Hiebert
- Genre: Satire
- Publication date: 1947
- Publication place: Canada
- ISBN: 978-0-771-09144-5
- Followed by: Willows Revisited (1967)

Sarah Binks is a novel published in 1947 by University of Manitoba professor Paul Hiebert. The novel is a faux biography of the titular Sarah Binks, the "Sweet Songstress of Saskatchewan." It satirizes literary pretensions—both of the critic and of the poet—by presenting a poet and critic (the author) whose productions are awash with misreadings and sentimental clap-trap.

In the novel, which is presented as part biography, part literary study, the author traces Sarah Binks' brief life and tragic death in the small town of Willows, Saskatchewan. Aside from a brief trip to Regina, Saskatchewan (presented as a epochal event in her life), Sarah's 25 years are spent entirely in the environs of her hometown, where she is consumed with both farm work and writing poetry. Much of her work is included within the biography, alongside glowing critical commentary -- although it's admitted that not a single person has been able to get through Binks' magnum opus Up From The Magma, said to be an epic that takes up a "cubic foot" of densely written pages of text.

The book was followed by a sequel, Willows Revisited (1967), which concentrates on other poets from the region, including the nearby hamlets of Pelvis and Quagmire.

== Reception and legacy ==
Peter Gzowski made Hiebert a frequent guest on his CBC Radio program Morningside and Hiebert thereby became well known across Canada. Now considered a Canadian classic, Sarah Binks has never been out of print since its original publication in 1947. Its New Canadian Library edition featured an afterword by Charles Gordon.

In 1967, Hiebert produced a sequel, Willows Revisited, which, although well-received, did not receive the same level of acclaim as the original novel. The title refers to Willows, the fictional Saskatchewan birthplace of Binks.

Although Hiebert's gentle brand of humour is recognizable to some in Canada, it is not uncommon for some to believe Sarah Binks to have been a real person and to excoriate her translations of Heinrich Heine. Though some reviewers have suggested models for Sarah, including Canadian poet E. Pauline Johnson, Hiebert said that his character was not based on any single person. The Canadian musician Glenn Gould composed a setting of one of the poems of Sarah Binks, The Farmer and the Farmer's Wife but left the composition unfinished.

A small town poet in The Cruelest Month by Louise Penny is compared to Binks.

== Awards and recognition ==
- Sarah Binks won the Stephen Leacock Memorial Medal for Humour in 1948.
- Sarah Binks was selected for the 2003 edition of CBC Radio's Canada Reads competition, where it was championed by author Will Ferguson.
- The fictitious poet Sarah Binks was awarded the equally fictitious Wheat Pool Medal, described as Saskatchewan's highest poetic honour
