= Shelley Peterson =

Canadian actress and writer

Shelley Peterson (née Matthews; born 1952) is a Canadian television and film actress and writer, she is also known for her bestselling book, Dancer. Best known as the star of the Canadian sitcoms Not My Department and Dog House. She is also an author of several novels, her best known book being Dancer.

Born in London, Ontario, she is married to former premier of Ontario, David Peterson, and her sister is Deb Matthews, former deputy premier of Ontario. One of her children is journalist and activist Benjamin Peterson. She and her husband live in Caledon, Ontario. Her father, Donald J. Matthews, was president of the Progressive Conservative Party of Canada from 1971 to 1974.

== Filmography ==
=== Film ===
Year	Title	Role	Notes
1977	Welcome to Blood City	1st Technician	
1986	A Judgment in Stone	Jackie Coverdale	
2007	Dead Silence	Lisa's Mom	

=== Television ===
Year	Title	Role	Notes
1976	Sidestreet	Eleanor Sanders	Episode: "Death Sentence"
1986	Dear Aunt Agnes	Kerry Tweed	Episode: "Battlezone"
1986, 1988	Night Heat	Witness / Patricia Parker	2 episodes
1987	Not My Department	Margaret Simmons	2 episodes
1988	Alfred Hitchcock Presents	Nurse Maxwell	Episode: "Killer Takes All"
1990, 1991	Dog House	Helen Underwood	2 episodes
1993	E.N.G.	Karen McMurray	Episode: "Suspicious Minds"
1995	Forever Knight	Dr. Jennifer Joyce	Episode: "My Boyfriend Is a Vampire"
1996	Einstein: Light to the Power of 2	Miss Fitch	Television film
2000	Twice in a Lifetime	Sarah	Episode: "Take Two"
2000	The Last Debate	Joyce Meredith	Television film
2006	Cow Belles	Miss Styles	Television film
