= Taking Off (film) =

1971 American film by Miloš Forman

- Poster art by Barbara Baranowska
- Directed by: Miloš Forman
- Written by: Jean-Claude Carrière; Miloš Forman; John Guare; John Klein
- Produced by: Alfred W. Crown
- Starring: Lynn Carlin; Buck Henry
- Cinematography: Miroslav Ondříček
- Edited by: John Carter
- Distributed by: Universal Pictures
- Release date: March 28, 1971 (New York City)
- Running time: 93 minutes
- Country: United States
- Language: English

Taking Off is a 1971 American comedy film directed by Miloš Forman. It tells of an average couple in New York City, who, when their teenage daughter runs away from home, connect with other parents of vanished children and start learning more about youth culture.

== Plot ==
Larry and Lynn Tyne return home to find their daughter Jeannie absent. (Viewers know she is attending an audition, clips from which, with future star performers like Carly Simon and Kathy Bates, recur throughout the film.) The Tynes ring the Divitos, with whose daughter Jeannie was supposed to be, but she says she doesn't know anything. They enlist their friends Tony and Margot for support; the men are unwillingly pushed out to search the neighborhood bars while the women stay by the phone and gossip about Margot's sex life. When the men return drunk, Jeannie reappears.

Next day, she has vanished again and Larry searches the city. He happens to run across another missing girl. Before she takes off with her hippie friends in a multiple chase scene, he manages to phone and bring her mother Ann. She tells Larry about the Society for the Parents of Fugitive Children.

The police call that Jeannie was arrested for stealing 300 miles upstate. The Tynes drive to claim her but find the Divitos' girl in custody, having given a false name to avoid her own parents. They decide to stay the night at a hotel, where Ike & Tina Turner are performing. A drunk Lynn is followed to their room by an amorous stranger, unaware that Larry is waiting in the bed. After the stranger runs away, Lynn emerges from the bathroom and tries out some of the tips Margot had confided to her to Larry's further confusion.

Back in NYC, the Tynes attend the SPFC's formal dinner. Afterwards, marijuana joints are handed round, and a young man named Schiavelli instructs the parents on how to smoke them. Happily high, Larry and Lynn take Ann and her husband Ben back to their home for more drinks; Ben initiates a game of "Texas one-card show-off" where the loser has to take off a piece of clothing. In the end a naked Larry sings "Libiamo ne' lieti calici" on top of the table just as Jeannie reappears, and the guests hastily leave.

When Jeannie mutely admits to having been "with a boy", Larry asks her to invite him for dinner. He looks like a morose hippie, but proves to be an intelligent, soft-spoken musician whose protest songs unwittingly made him absurdly rich. Still, he declines to perform for the hosts. In the final scene, it is Lynn who plays the piano while Larry sings "Stranger in Paradise".

== Cast ==
- Linnea Heacock as Jeannie Tyne
- Lynn Carlin as Lynn Tyne
- Buck Henry as Larry Tyne
- Georgia Engel as Margot
- Tony Harvey as Tony
- Audra Lindley as Ann Lockston
- Paul Benedict as Ben Lockston
- Vincent Schiavelli as himself (Vincent Schiavelli)
- David Gittler as Jamie
- Ike Turner as himself
- Tina Turner as herself
- Corinna Cristobal as Corinna DiVito
- Rae Allen as Mrs. DiVito
- Frank Berle as Committee Man
- Philip Bruns as Policeman (credited as Phillip Bruns)
- Gail Busman as Nancy Lockston
- Allen Garfield as Norman
- Carly Simon as Audition Singer
- Kathy Bates as Audition Singer (as Bobo Bates)
- Shellen Lubin as Audition Singer
- Shelley Ackerman as Audition Singer
- Lois Dengrove as Audition Singer
- Bonnie Marcus as Audition Singer
- Jane Scheckter as Audition Singer
- Jessica Harper as herself (Jessica Harper)

== Production ==
In 1968 Forman obtained a visa to plan a US film. Forman and Ivan Passer arranged a "house on Leroy Street in Greenwich Village" and studied the counterculture there.

The plot of Taking Off was inspired by a girl found murdered in an apartment not far from Forman's. A newspaper reported about "a girl who would leave her affluent family in Connecticut every Monday to spend the week living on the street in New York City, all the while telling her folks that she was in school".

Taking Off reuses a device from Forman's Audition (Konkurs, 1964) where Forman staged an audition for the post of a singer in a popular musical theatre. However that had participants singing the same song and interacting with the jury more over the simple "Next!"

Cast as Jeannie in her only film role, Linnea Heacock was "discovered", with friends, in Washington Square Park.

The performers "were encouraged to improvise based on Forman's descriptions of the overall shape of a scene".

== Awards ==
Taking Off shared the Grand Prix Spécial du Jury ex aequo with Johnny Got His Gun at the 1971 Cannes Film Festival. (This was the second prize after the Grand Prix du Festival International du Film, won by The Go-Between.)

The film received six nominations without a win at the 1972 BAFTA awards: Best Direction (for Forman), Best Film, Best Film Editing (for Carter), Best Screenplay (for Forman, Guare, Carrière, and Klein), Best Actress (for Carlin), and Best Supporting Actress (for Engel).

== Reception ==
In The New York Times, Vincent Canby declared that "Taking Off is not a major movie experience, but it is — a good deal of the time — a charming one." Variety called it "a very compassionate, very amusing contemporary comedy." The notoriously vitriolic John Simon wrote 'I declare Taking Off an antihuman film: mean, arrogant, and thoroughly destructive'.

Dave Kehr of the Chicago Reader summed the film in retrospect as "an engaging, episodic, wonderfully fair-minded satire about runaway children and anxious adults" and "still the most graceful and well-proportioned work he’s done here" [in the US, by 1985].

Much later in The Guardian, Howard Jacobson enthused about loving it for 45 years as "a good film that waits for you to grow up emotionally", showing not only "the older generation’s anger and confusion" but also "the sweet cruelty of being young". On the review aggregator website Rotten Tomatoes, 100% of 13 critics' reviews are positive, with an average rating of 7.6/10.

== Home media ==
Until 2008, Taking Off was not available on home video due to music rights complications.

Taking Off was released to Blu-ray Disc by British company Park Circus, on 7 November 2011 as a Region-2 widescreen Blu-ray Disc and by Gaumont (with Carlotta Films as home video distributor) on March 23, 2011, as a Region-0 widescreen Blu-ray Disc.

== Novelization ==
Forman, Miloš; Guare, John; Carrière, Jean-Claude; Klein, John (1971). Taking Off. New York: Signet Books.

A novelization, with new "scene settings" written by Forman and Nancy Hardin (a former book editor and Hollywood-based literary agent, turned early "female studio executive"; by 1977, vice president of Paramount Pictures), and an essay by Forman about his life in America and making Taking Off.

== Soundtrack ==
- Taking Off (soundtrack)
