= Marco Sanchez =

American actor, producer, and writer

- Occupations: Actor, producer, writer
- Years active: 1990–present
- Website: www.marcosanchez.org

Marco Sanchez is an American actor, producer, and writer.

== Filmography ==
=== Film ===
Year	Title	Role	Notes
1993	Gunsmoke: The Long Ride	Collie Whitebird	TV movie
1996	Fall Into Darkness	Nico	TV movie
2000	The Last Debate	Henry Ramirez	TV movie
2001	American Pie 2	Marco	Uncredited
2002	The Rookie	Sanchez	
2002	My Wonderful Life	Roy	TV movie
2003	Between the Sheets	Eduardo	
2004	Illusion	Sanchez	
2005	Edison	Reyes	
2006	Flirt	Simon	
2007	Richard III	Richmond	
2007	Tyrannosaurus Azteca	Ríos	
2008	Diamonds and Guns	INS Agent McFadden	
2008	Cat City	Alejandro	
2009	Rehab for Rejects	Principal	TV movie
2011	Super 8	Hernandez	
2012	Tales of Everyday Magic	Andre	
2012	My Greatest Teacher	Andre	
2013	Star Trek Into Darkness	Torpedo Security	
2017	The Most Hated Woman in America	Frank Gonzalez	

=== Television ===
Year	Title	Role	Notes
1990-1991	Knots Landing	Paul	Episodes: "Side by Side", "Asked to Rise", "The Unknown", "An American Hero"
1991	CBS Schoolbreak Special	Ben	Episode: "But He Loves Me"
1991	Pacific Station	Sandwich Vendor	Episode: "A Man's Best Friend"
1991	In the Heat of the Night	Emelio Suarez	Episode: "Unfinished Business"
1992	Flying Blind	Julian	Episode: "Crazy for You...and You"
1992	Captain Planet and the Planeteers	Carlos	Episode: "The Dream Machine"
1993-1995	SeaQuest DSV	Sensor Chief Miguel Ortiz	44 episodes
1995	Married... with Children	Ramon	Episode: "A Shoe Room with a View"
1995	First Time Out	Unknown	Episode: "The Platonic Friend Show"
1996	Party of Five	Parker	Episode: "Unfair Advantage"
1996	Murder, She Wrote	Luiz Decalde	Episode: "Death Goes Double Platinum"
1997	Nick Freno: Licensed Teacher	Artie	Episode: "Nick at Night"
1997	Pacific Blue	Oscar Velasquez	Episode: "Soul Mate"
1997-1999	Walker, Texas Ranger	Detective Carlos Sandoval	16 episodes
1999	Sons of Thunder	Detective Carlos Sandoval	6 episodes
2000	JAG	Petty Officer Mark DeMara	Episode: "Cabin Pressure"
2000	The Pretender	Agent Dennis Alonzo	Episode: "Lifeline"
2000	V.I.P	Kovak	Episode: "Lights, Camera, Val"
2001	Charmed	Tom Peters	Episode: "Wrestling with Demons"
2001	The Division	Inspector Frank Perez	Episodes: "Obsessions", "Deal with the Devil", "Secrets and Lies"
2002	Providence	Jose	Episode: "Cloak & Dagger"
2003	ER	O'Connor	Episode: "When Night Meets Day"
2003	Star Trek: Enterprise	Corporal Romero	Episode: "The Xindi"
2003	24	Agent Rafael Gutierrez	Episode: "Day 3: 8:00 p.m.-9:00 p.m."
2005	CSI: NY	Ramir Santo	Episode: "Tanglewood"
2005	Love, Inc.	Handsome Bar Guy	Episode: "Pilot"
2005	Inconceivable	Danny Santos	Episode: "The Last Straw"
2005	Hot Properties	Manuel	Episodes: "Grrr...", "Dating Up, Dating Down"
2006	Desperate Housewives	Phil Lopez	Episode: "Nice She Ain't"
2006	Ghost Whisperer	Freddy Diaz	Episodes: "The Night We Met", "The Woman of His Dreams"
2006-2019	Criminal Minds	Detective Murad	Episodes: "Psychodrama", "Truth or Dare"
2007	Two and a Half Men	Hector	Episode: "Castrating Sheep in Montana"
2007	CSI: Miami	Dave Montavo	Episode: "Broken Home"
2007	In Case of Emergency	Gary	Episode: "Proof of Love"
2009	The Mentalist	Frank Schiappa	Episode: "Paint It Red"
2009	Bones	Thomas Vega	Episode: "The Hero in the Hold"
2009	Dollhouse	Blevins	Episode: "Omega"
2010-2018	NCIS	Alejandro Rivera	7 episodes
2011	Law & Order: LA	Felipe Pena	Episode: "El Sereno"
2011	Morbid Minutes	Tom	Episode: "Blind Date"
2012	Bedlam	Rodrigo Guzman	
2013	The Secret Life of the American Teenager	Dr. Ortiz	Episodes: "Untying the Knot", "It's a Miracle"
2013	The Client List	Gaham Sandoval	6 episodes
2013	Switched at Birth	Victor	Episode: "Prudence, Avarice, Lust, Justice, Anger"
2014	Rake	Dr. Oliver Kelly	Episode: "Hey, Good Looking"
2014	Murder in the First	Carlos Rodriguez	Episode: "Burning Woman"
2015	CSI: Cyber	Detective Gonzalez	Episode: "Heart Me"
2016	Rosewood	Dr. Gus Willing	Episode: "Ballistics & BFFs"
2016	Sing It!	Alonzo Quesa	
2017	Training Day	Paul DiNardo	Episode: "Bad Day at Aqua Mesa"
2017	MacGyver	Mr. Diaz	Episode: "DIY or DIE"
2017	Lucifer	Lieutenant Herrera	Episode: "Mr. and Mrs. Mazikeen Smith"
2018	9-1-1	Davis	Episode: "Trapped"
2018	Get Shorty	Roberto Torres	Episodes: "Curtains", "Banana Split"
2019	No Good Nick	Eduardo	Episodes: "The Pied Piper", "The Italian Job", "The Pig in a Poke"
