= Charles Gordon (journalist) =

Canadian writer (born 1940)

Charles Gordon CM
- Born: 1940 (age 85–86); New York City, New York, U.S.
- Education: Queen's University
- Occupations: Novelist; humorist; journalist
- Parent: J. King Gordon
- Writing career
- Period: 1970s–2000s
- Notable works: The Governor General's Bunny Hop (1985); The Canada Trip (1997)

Charles William Gordon CM (born 1940) is a Canadian writer and retired journalist, best known as a longtime columnist for the Ottawa Citizen.

== Background ==
Born in New York City while his father J. King Gordon was working in publishing there, Gordon grew up in several cities around the world during his father's diplomatic career with the United Nations. He is also the brother of writer Alison Gordon and the grandson of novelist Ralph Connor. He studied political science at Queen's University.

== Career ==
While completing his master's degree in political science, Gordon was hired as an editor with the Brandon Sun in 1964, remaining with the paper until joining the Citizen in 1974. With the Citizen, he held a variety of roles – including writing editorials, editing the local news and books sections, and writing his daily column – until retiring from the paper in 2005. He took a leave of absence from the paper in 2002 to serve for several months as writer-in-residence at the University of Ottawa. Gordon's columns were noted for their wry and sometimes satirical humour.

He published several books, both fiction and non-fiction. His first book, The Governor General's Bunny Hop, was adapted by CBC Television into the short-lived sitcom Not My Department. He also wrote the afterword for the New Canadian Library edition of Paul Hiebert's influential humour novel Sarah Binks.

== Awards and honours ==
He was a three-time nominee for the Stephen Leacock Memorial Medal for Humour, garnering nods in 1986 for The Governor General's Bunny Hop, in 1994 for How Not to Be Too Bad and in 2002 for The Grim Pig.

He was granted an honorary doctorate from Brandon University in 1994.

He was appointed as a member of the Order of Canada in 2023. He lives in Ottawa.

== Works ==
- The Governor General's Bunny Hop (1985, ISBN 077159688X)
- At the Cottage: An Affectionate Look at Canada's Summer Obsession (1989, ISBN 0771033931)
- How to Be Not Too Bad: A Canadian Guide to Superior Behaviour (1993, ISBN 0771033923)
- The Canada Trip (1997, ISBN 0771033893)
- The Grim Pig (2001, ISBN 0771033974)
- Still at the Cottage: Or the Cabin, the Shack, the Lake, the Beach, or Camp (2006, ISBN 978-0771034145)
