= Paul Hiebert (writer) =

Canadian writer and humorist (1892–1987)

- Born: Paul Gerhardt Hiebert; 17 July 1892; Pilot Mound, Manitoba, Canada
- Died: 6 September 1987 (aged 95); Carman, Manitoba, Canada
- Alma mater: University of Manitoba; University of Toronto; McGill University
- Occupations: Writer, humorist, chemistry professor
- Writing career
- Language: English
- Genres: Humour, nonfiction
- Notable work: Sarah Binks
- Notable awards: Stephen Leacock Medal for Humour (1948)

Paul Gerhardt Hiebert (17 July 1892 – 6 September 1987) was a Canadian writer and humorist best known for his book Sarah Binks (1947), which was awarded the Stephen Leacock Medal for Humour in 1948. A sequel, Willows Revisited, was published in 1967.

== Biography ==
Hiebert was born July 17, 1892, in Pilot Mound, Manitoba, and grew up in Altona, Manitoba, after moving there with his family at age seven. He was educated at the University of Manitoba, the University of Toronto, and McGill University. In 1942 Hiebert accepted a position as a professor of chemistry at the University of Manitoba, which he held until retiring in 1953.

== Death ==
At the time of his retirement he indicated that he planned to move to Carman, Manitoba, and write "important books." He died in Carman in 1987.

== Works ==
=== Humour ===
- Sarah Binks (1947)
- Willows Revisited (1967)
- For the Birds (1980)

=== Nonfiction ===
- Tower in Siloam (1966)
- Doubting Castle: A Spiritual Autobiography (1976)
- Not as the Scribes (1984)
