= Stay Tuned (TV series) =

- Genre: Comedy
- Written by: Bob Sandler
- Starring: Jayne Eastwood; Ben Gordon; Eugene Levy; Mary Ann McDonald
- Country of origin: Canada
- Original language: English
- No. of seasons: 1

Production
- Producer: Nigel Napier-Andrews
- Running time: up to 30 minutes

Original release
- Network: CBC Television
- Release: 9 October 1976 – 1 January 1977

Stay Tuned is a Canadian comedy television series that aired on CBC Television from 1976 to 1977.

== Premise ==
This live comedy series began once the Hockey Night in Canada broadcast concluded and continued until 11:00 p.m., the start of The National. Material was tailored to the available time slot. For example, the debut episode ran 9½ minutes. Its regular cast was Jayne Eastwood, Ben Gordon, Eugene Levy, and Mary Ann McDonald. Guests included the Homemade Theatre troupe, John Kastner and Nancy White.

The series was originally titled Fourth Period.

== Scheduling ==
This series was broadcast Saturdays approximately 10:30 p.m. to 11:00 p.m. (Eastern) following Hockey Night in Canada from 9 October 1976 to 1 January 1977.
