= Les Brillant =

French Canadian TV series

Les Brillant is a French Canadian comedy television series that aired on TVA for three seasons between 1979 and 1982. A total of 101 episodes aired. It was broadcast as reruns during summertime throughout the 1980s and is now regularly scheduled on the Prise 2 digital TV network.
