= Shellen Lubin =

American dramatist

Shellen Lubin (born April 4, 1953) is an American director, writer, performer, and teacher of theatre and music. She is best known for her philosophical musings about art and artists, found in her Monday Morning Quotesand articles in Backstage.

== Early life ==
Shellen Lubin was born and raised in Valley Stream, New York, United States, by parents Samuel and Lora Lubin (née Bondrov), with her older sister Allene. She graduated from Bennington College in 1974 with a triple major in Drama, Music and Dance. During her time at Bennington, she appeared in Miloš Forman's first film in America, 'Taking Off', which featured two songs she wrote ("It's Sunday", which she performed, and "Feeling Sort Of Nice", performed by Karen Klugman). After graduating, she moved to New York City to continue pursuing her career in music and theatre.

== Songwriting and theatre ==
Her first major theater project after college was the musical Molly's Daughters, which she wrote for the American Jewish Theater in 1978. It was produced twice, first at the Henry St. Settlement featuring Lisa Loomer and Jane Ives, then at the 92nd Street Y featuring Rosalind Harris and directed by Pamela Berlin. Afterwards, she spent a long time writing various plays and songs, most notably Imperfect Flowers for Gretchen Cryer and James “Jimmy” Wlcek, and a number of songs with musician and composer Bill Dixon. In 1983, WBAI-FM presented a one-hour special of her songs entitled Shellen Lubin, Songwriter/Singer. She also wrote and performed a one-woman musical about the experience of having her first child (entitled 'Mother/Child') at numerous cabaret spaces and theatres from 1986–88, including the Susan Bloch Theater and Interart Theatre.

In 1989, she began her professional theater directing career at the Producer's Club Theatre with LIARS, written by Elliot Meyers and starring James “Jimmy” Wlcek, Peter Sprague, Annie Hughes, and Joyce West. She followed LIARS with Larry Myers’ Gene Tierney Moved Next Door in 1994 at Theater for the New City, with Cynthia Enfield, Rik Walter and Tom Fenaughty.

== Other works ==
=== Backstage articles ===
Based on her years of work in theater and her growing Monday Morning Quotes mailing list, the theater publication, Backstage, commissioned Shellen Lubin to write seven cover pieces about the experience of living as an artist and working in the business of the Arts. She is the only person ever to have written for Back Stage from a philosophical perspective.
