= David Peterson =

20th premier of Ontario (born 1943)

The Honourable David Peterson PC OOnt ECO KC
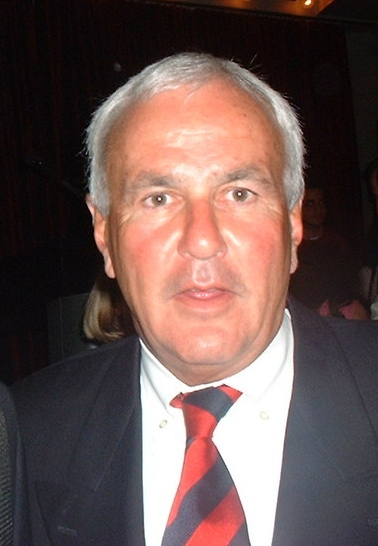
- Peterson in 2001

20th Premier of Ontario
- In office June 26, 1985 – October 1, 1990
- Monarch: Elizabeth II
- Lieutenant Governor: John Black Aird; Lincoln Alexander
- Deputy: Robert Nixon
- Preceded by: Frank Miller
- Succeeded by: Bob Rae

Member of Provincial Parliament
- In office September 18, 1975 – September 6, 1990
- Preceded by: Riding established
- Succeeded by: Marion Boyd
- Constituency: London Centre

Ontario Liberal Party Leader
- In office February 21, 1982 – September 6, 1990
- Preceded by: Stuart Smith
- Succeeded by: Robert Nixon

Leader of the Official Opposition
- In office February 21, 1982 – June 26, 1985
- Preceded by: Robert Nixon
- Succeeded by: Frank Miller
Other positions
32nd Chancellor of the University of Toronto
In office July 1, 2006 – June 30, 2012
| President | David Naylor |
| Preceded by | Vivienne Poy |
| Succeeded by | Michael Wilson |
Chair of the Toronto Organizing Committee for the 2015 Pan and Parapan American Games
In office January 21, 2010 – August 15, 2015
| Leader | Mario Vázquez Raña; Julio Maglione |
- Preceded by: Aurelio Lopez Rocha (Guadalajara 2011)
- Succeeded by: Carlos Neuhaus Tudela (Lima 2019)

Personal details
- Born: David Robert Peterson; December 28, 1943 (age 82) Toronto, Ontario, Canada
- Party: Liberal
- Spouse: Shelley Peterson
- Children: Three
- Relatives: Jim Peterson (brother), Tim Peterson (brother), Deb Matthews (sister-in-law)
- Education: University of Western Ontario; University of Toronto Faculty of Law
- Profession: Lawyer

David Robert Peterson PC OOnt ECO KC (born December 28, 1943) is a Canadian lawyer and former politician who served as the 20th premier of Ontario from 1985 to 1990. He was the first Liberal officeholder in 42 years, ending the Tory dynasty.

== Background ==
Peterson was born in Toronto, Ontario, to Clarence Marwin Peterson (1913–2009) and Laura Marie Scott (1913–2015), and has two siblings, former MPP Tim Peterson and former MP Jim Peterson. His parents were both born in Saskatchewan. His father was born to Norwegian immigrant farmers who had previously homesteaded in North Dakota. In the early 1930s, Clarence Peterson joined the newly-formed Co-operative Commonwealth Federation and was present at the conference where it adopted the Regina Manifesto. Looking for work during the Great Depression, he moved to Ontario and in 1936 was living in Toronto, where he found a job as a salesman with Union Carbide. The job eventually took him to London, Ontario, where he worked for the company for several years before establishing a wholesale electronics business, C.M. Peterson Co. Ltd, in 1944. He was elected to city council as an alderman in the early 1950s and joined the Ontario Liberal Party, running as its candidate in the 1955 Ontario general election in London North, losing to future premier John Robarts, and ran again as a federal Liberal candidate in 1963 in London.

Peterson grew up in London and earned his Bachelor of Arts degree from the University of Western Ontario in political science and philosophy and his law degree from the University of Toronto. He was called to the bar in 1969. He was made a Queen's Counsel in 1980 and later was appointed to the Queen's Privy Council for Canada in 1992 by Brian Mulroney.

At the age of twenty-six, he became president of C.M. Peterson Company Limited, a wholesale electronics firm founded by his father. He holds four Honorary degrees including a doctor of laws from the University of Western Ontario and is a knight of the Order of the Legion of Honour of France and a member of the Order of La Pléiade. In 2009, he became a member of the Order of Ontario.

Peterson married actress Shelley Matthews in 1974 and they have since raised three children. He is the younger brother of Jim Peterson (1941–2024), formerly a federal Liberal MP and cabinet minister. Both his sister-in-law Deb Matthews and his brother, Tim Peterson, were elected to the Ontario legislature in the 2003 provincial election while Deb Matthews was re-elected in 2007, 2011 and 2014.

== Politics ==
Peterson was elected as the Liberal Member of Provincial Parliament for London Centre in the 1975 provincial election. Less than one year later, he campaigned for the leadership of the party following Robert Nixon's resignation. Despite his inexperience, Peterson nevertheless came within 45 votes of defeating Stuart Smith on the third and final ballot of a delegated convention held on January 25, 1976. Smith presented an image of an articulate intellectual who some delegates said reminded them of Pierre Trudeau while Peterson came across as similar to then Premier Bill Davis. Convention delegates also thought that Peterson, a neophyte MPP at 31 years old, was too young and his convention address which he later characterized as the "worst speech in modern political history" came across as stilted and over rehearsed.

Peterson was re-elected in the provincial elections of 1977 and 1981. He ran again for the Liberal leadership in 1982, after Smith resigned.

The convention was held on February 21, 1982. This time his convention speech was better. Although not very inspiring, it was viewed as 'statesmanlike' and effective. He won on the second ballot defeating the more left-leaning Sheila Copps with 55% of the vote. In his acceptance speech Peterson said that he would move party to the 'vibrant middle, the radical centre', and stressed economic growth as a way to increase support for social services. Observers from the other parties felt he was trying to move the Liberal party more to the right, away from values that Smith promoted.

=== Liberal leader ===
Peterson worked to pay off the party's debt from the 1981 election and accomplished that by the end of the year and was working on long-term debt. Peterson performed well as opposition leader and was popular in the press. The party started to use him as a label rather than 'Liberal' referring to 'David Peterson's Ontario'. A by-election loss to the NDP was attributed to dislike of Federal Liberals. In 1984, a Liberal backbencher, J. Earl McEwen crossed the floor to join the Tories. In 1984, four of the party's senior MPPs quit provincial politics to run for the federal Liberal government led by John Turner, who had just won the party leadership to succeed a retiring Pierre Trudeau as Prime Minister; ending up the federal Liberals' support collapsed and they were badly defeated in the election by Brian Mulroney. Polling in late 1984 showed Peterson's Liberals consistently trailing behind the Progressive Conservatives. Premier Davis still polled as the most popular leader.

Peterson's fortunes improved when Davis retired as leader of the Progressive Conservative Party in early 1985. His successor, Frank Miller, took the party further to the right, and was unable to convince the electorate of his leadership abilities. Though Miller's Tories began the election in 1985 with a significant lead, Peterson's Liberals gradually increased their support throughout the campaign. Peterson frequently campaigned in his red jogging suit and projected the image of a younger urban leader, contrasting with Miller who was increasingly seen as too old and rural. To the surprise of many, Peterson won a narrow plurality of the popular vote. However, at the time rural areas were still slightly over represented in the Legislative Assembly. As a result, the Liberals won 48 seats, while the Progressive Conservatives 52 which was enough for a minority government.

Shortly after the election, NDP leader Bob Rae called Peterson to negotiate. Rae also initiated talks with Premier Miller but the talks with the Liberals proved more fruitful. Rae and Peterson signed a "Liberal-NDP Accord" in which the NDP agreed to support a Liberal government in office for two years. The Liberals, in turn, agreed to implement some policies favoured by the NDP. Rae wanted to have a coalition with representation in cabinet but Peterson indicated that he would not accept a coalition. To make sure the public would not misconstrue the agreement as a coalition, Peterson made sure that there would be no photos of him and Rae signing the agreement.

=== Premier of Ontario ===
==== Leadership style ====
The Liberals and NDP defeated Miller's government on June 18, 1985, when Rae introduced a motion of no confidence on the speech from the throne. Peterson was sworn in as Premier of Ontario eight days later. Peterson's top three cabinet ministers were Robert Nixon as Treasurer, Sean Conway as Education Minister, and Ian Scott as Attorney General.

After the expiration of the Liberal-NDP Accord in 1987, the Liberals called another provincial election, and won the second-largest majority government in Ontario's history, taking 95 seats out of 130, at the expense of the NDP and the Progressive Conservatives who dropped to third place in the legislature. After the 1987 election, Peterson told the newly enlarged caucus at their first meeting that his popularity may have got most of them elected, but warned that he would likely need their help getting re-elected next time, since he understood that his massive victory had created expectations that simply couldn’t be met.

==== Domestic policy ====
Peterson's government introduced several pieces of progressive legislation. It eliminated "extra billing" by doctors, brought in pay equity provisions, and reformed the province's rent review and labour negotiation laws. His government also brought in pension reform, expanded housing construction, and resolved a long-standing provincial controversy by honouring the Davis Tories promise to extend full funding to Catholic secondary schools. Peterson was also a vocal opponent of free trade with the United States in 1988. His administration was less activist in its later years, though it still introduced progressive measures on environmental protection, eliminated health insurance premiums, and brought in no-fault automobile insurance for the province.

Peterson's prominent role in creating and promoting the "Meech Lake" constitutional accord gained criticism from some. While initially popular, this attempt at revising Canada's constitution proved extremely divisive in most of English-speaking Canada. Many believed that it gave too many concessions to Quebec, while others believed that it weakened the federal government's authority in relation to the provinces. Peterson's continued support for the accord, in the face of increased opposition, damaged his personal popularity in Ontario. The accord was not endorsed by Manitoba and Newfoundland, and did not pass. As Ontario's economy slowed down, the public also questioned Peterson's devotion to nation-building issues such as the Meech Lake Accord, instead of "more mundane kitchen-table issues such as rising taxes and skyrocketing auto-insurance premiums".

Peterson and the Liberals also faced controversy over the Patti Starr affair. Starr, a prominent Liberal fundraiser, was found to have improperly diverted money from a land development scheme and charitable organizations to the provincial Liberal Party. Several Liberal cabinet members were recipients of her largesse including Health Minister Elinor Caplan, Transportation Minister Ed Fulton and Revenue Minister Bernard Grandmaitre. These revelations led to a cabinet shuffle by Peterson in which five ministers who had received contributions lost their positions. On June 24, 1989, Peterson ordered a judicial inquiry be set up to investigate the matter. Initially Starr wanted to participate in the inquiry saying, "I stand by all the things I participated in ... I think the inquiry will be a positive thing." Later on she moved to have the inquiry quashed. In January 1990, the Ontario Court of Appeal dismissed her request. Two weeks later the Supreme Court of Canada gave her leave to appeal. In a decision in April, the Supreme Court declared the inquiry unconstitutional. Starr successfully argued that an inquiry investigating criminal charges would deny subjects their full legal rights. Public inquiries can compel witnesses to testify but criminal trial defendants can refuse to testify. Starr was eventually sentenced to six months' jail time. Although no-one in Peterson's administration was accused of criminal activity, the scandal eroded public confidence in the integrity of the government. Polls showed that more than half of respondents felt that Peterson had poorly handled the matter and 61% felt that it revealed widespread corruption in the government.

==== Fiscal policy ====
The Peterson administration also developed a reputation for fiscal prudence, under the management of Treasurer Robert Nixon. The Liberal government was able to introduce a balanced budget for 1989–1990 following several years of deficit spending in Ontario, at a time when deficit spending was commonplace in most of North America.

In the early 1990s recession, Ontario faced a weakening North American economy. Productivity levels were falling throughout the United States and Canada during this period. While there was little that Peterson, or any other Ontario Premier, could have done to prevent this downturn, it weakened his government's reputation for fiscal competence. (Indeed, the government's projected surplus budget for 1990–1991 ultimately yielded a deficit of at least three billion dollars.) Peterson "was getting a ton of advice to call an early snap election after less than three years" and "pundits warned Peterson he certainly didn’t want to call an election in 1991, in the middle of a deep recession".

==== Defeat in the 1990 provincial election ====
Notwithstanding all of this, Peterson's Liberal Party still retained a comfortable lead over the Progressive Conservatives and NDP in mid-1990 public opinion polls, as their party leaders Mike Harris and Bob Rae, respectively, were not expected to be strong challengers. The PC Party was broke after the 1987 election, and anticipating an early election call they held their leadership contest in May 1990 with a membership vote instead of a delegated convention, they still struggled due to newly minted leader Harris's inexperience as well as an association with Prime Minister Brian Mulroney's growing unpopularity. The NDP having never won an Ontario election and Official Opposition leader Bob Rae was considering retiring from the legislature after one more term. As a result, Peterson decided to call a snap election, less than three years into his mandate. This proved to be his greatest mistake.

During the first week of the campaign, then-attorney general Ian Scott, claimed that 'while the voters might be cranky at the moment, they ultimately would hold their noses and re-elect the Liberals. After all, he added, “They’re not going to vote for Mike Harris, and what are they going to do — vote NDP?”' However many voters saw the early election as a mark of arrogance, and a sign that Peterson's Liberals had become detached from the electorate. There was no defining issue behind the campaign, and many believed that Peterson was simply trying to win re-election before the economic downturn reached its worst phase. Some Liberal cabinet ministers, most notably Greg Sorbara and Jim Bradley, were strongly opposed to the early election call. Sean Conway, a member of Peterson's inner circle, would later acknowledge that most backbench MPPs also opposed the timing of the campaign.

At the time the writ was dropped, the Liberals stood at 50% support in the polls. Peterson's personal popularity rating based on his Meech Lake record was 54%. However, his luck turned immediately upon calling the election. One of the seminal moments in the campaign was at a press conference called to announce the forthcoming election. Peterson justified the early writ claiming "especially after the failure of the Meech Lake Accord, Ontario faced 'profound changes in this country and the world' and that he needed to protect the province in the event of a national-unity crisis", while denying "that he was being an opportunist and trying to capitalize on polling results that put Liberal support at 50 per cent". It was soon interrupted without intervention by security or police by Greenpeace activist Gord Perks, who arrived with a briefcase handcuffed to his arm, with a tape recorder inside playing a pre-recorded list of broken Liberal environmental promises. Peterson sat in front of the room full of reporters, awkwardly silent and clearly uncomfortable.

Peterson's Liberal party, regarded as a challenger in 1985, was seen by the end of the 1980s as a "juggernaut that became arrogant and didn’t listen to its critics". As the PC and NDP opposition parties were weakened after the 1987 election, it fell to the media and other special interest groups (particularly teachers’ unions and environmental groups) who were criticizing the Ontario government at a level not seen with past administrations. Disappointed by high expectations from Peterson's 1987 massive electoral victory, as well as perceiving that the PC and NDP parties would not be strong opposition, groups representing various interests (such as teachers, doctors, and environmentalists), came out against Peterson on television, radio, in print, and at Liberal campaign events, despite the Liberals having worked cooperatively with these special interest groups prior to the election call. Protesters would follow the Premier throughout the campaign, and often received considerable media coverage. The media reported the election call as cynical, and the party appeared desperate when they unexpectedly proposed to cut the provincial sales tax halfway through the campaign. It did not help that the provincial election campaign was being run in the aftermath of the failed Meech Lake constitutional accord of Brian Mulroney's federal government, with which Peterson had significant media exposure in association with the other first ministers.

Peterson felt that the Liberals’ fading poll numbers "reflected greater anxieties about the world and that the party had failed to successfully communicate his government’s accomplishments"; by contrast the NDP's hastily assembled platform called "Agenda for People" managed to escape heavy scrutiny due to their underdog status. As the NDP gained momentum, the Liberals panicked as many candidates removed Peterson from their campaign materials and distanced themselves from Peterson, while Treasurer Robert Nixon proposed a cut to the sales tax. The Liberal campaign slogan shifted from “Effective leadership for a strong Ontario” to “Warning: An NDP government will be hazardous to your health.” Toronto Sun columnist Michael Bennett summed up the divergent fortunes of the Liberals and NDP as campaign progressed, writing “As Peterson became more strident, Rae assumed an almost statesman-like attitude. He’d used up most of the venom early in the campaign. Now he didn’t need it.”

On September 6, 1990, the NDP scored one of the greatest upsets in Canadian political history, taking 74 seats for a strong majority government. Due to the nature of the first-past-the-post system as well as numerous fringe parties contesting this election, one third of NDP seats were won with less than 40 per cent of the vote. While the NDP only outpolled the Liberals by a narrow six-point margin, they managed to unseat many Liberal incumbents in the Greater Toronto Area. The Liberal caucus was decimated as they plunged from 95 seats to 36, at the time their worst showing ever. The 59-seat loss surpassed the 48-seat loss in 1943 that began the Tories' long rule over the province. This was also the second-worst defeat for a governing party in Ontario. Peterson lost his own seat, having been resoundingly defeated by NDP candidate Marion Boyd in London Centre by over 8,200 votes. The loss ended Peterson's political career. He announced his resignation as Liberal leader on the night of the election.

== Later career ==
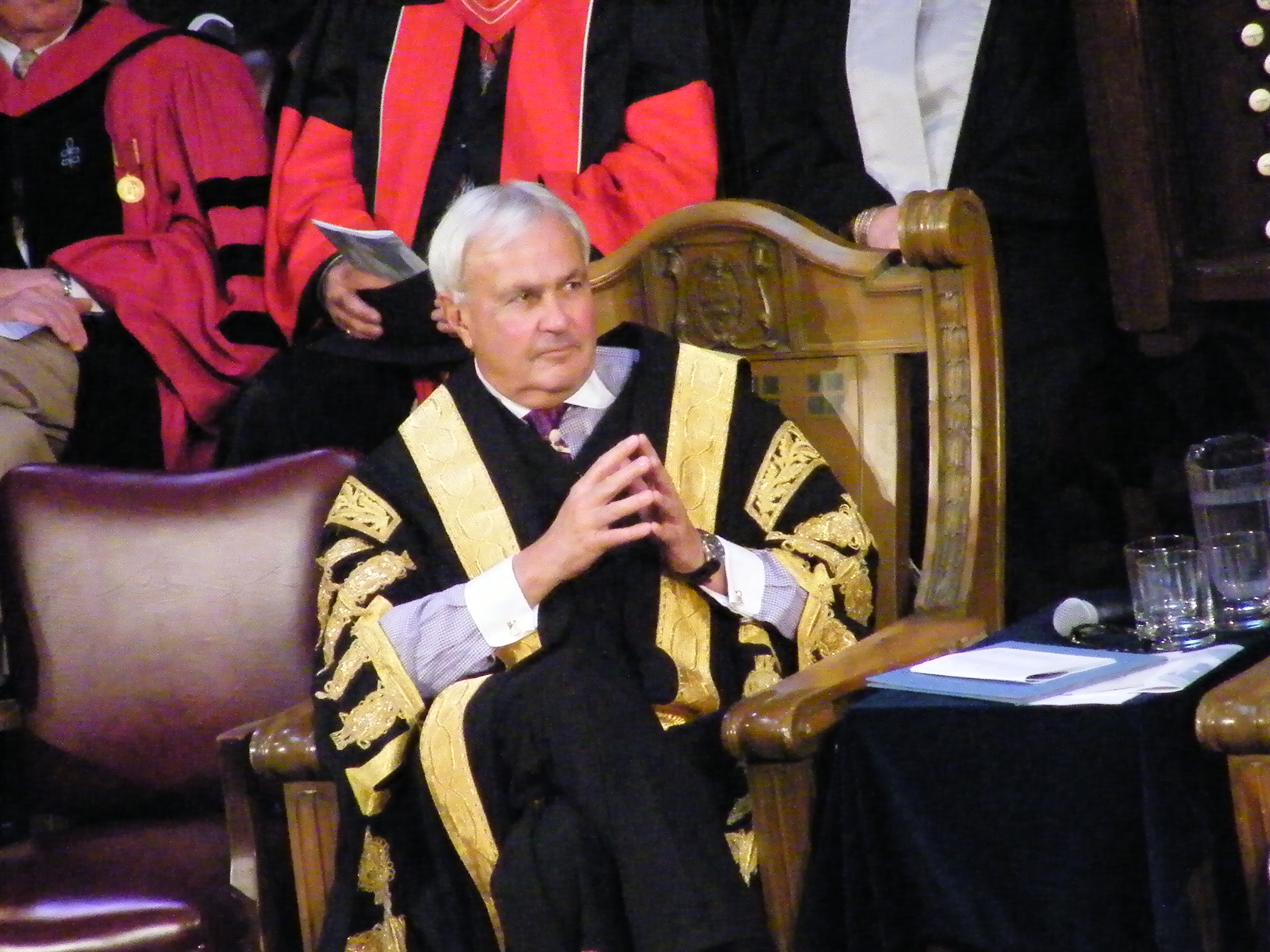
Peterson as Chancellor of the University of Toronto in 2009

=== Post-provincial politics ===
Peterson has continued to organize and fund-raise for the federal and Ontario provincial Liberals. In May 2005, he played the central role in persuading Belinda Stronach, a federal Conservative MP, to cross the floor to the ruling Liberal Party, days before a crucial confidence motion on the federal budget of Paul Martin's Liberal minority government. The defection proved critical to the survival of Martin's government, with the outcome of the budget vote 153–152 in favour of the government.

After Martin resigned the party leadership in the wake of the Liberal defeat in the 2006 election, Peterson planned to support former New Brunswick Premier Frank McKenna who chose ultimately not to run. Peterson then backed Michael Ignatieff, criticizing former political opponent Bob Rae's entry into the race due to the latter's record as provincial premier. Peterson insisted he did not hold a personal grudge against Rae.

=== Other ===
In 2003, Peterson was contracted by the federal government to be its chief negotiator in talks with the government of the Northwest Territories and aboriginal leaders to transfer federal powers over lands and resources.

Peterson served as Chancellor of the University of Toronto for two terms from July 1, 2006, until June 30, 2012.

In September 2013, Peterson was appointed chair of the Toronto 2015 Pan American Games Organizing Committee. In 2015, he was sued for alleged sexual harassment of a 34-year-old female Pan Am games manager Ximena Morris. Peterson denied any wrongdoing.

The case was dismissed with Morris apologising for the lawsuit but not the allegations.

David Peterson was the founding chairman of the Toronto Raptors of the National Basketball Association, and was a member of Toronto's Olympics Bid Committee. Since leaving politics, he has been a professor at York University in Toronto, a senior partner and chairman of the Toronto law firm Cassels, Brock & Blackwell LLP and has been director or member of several charitable, cultural, and environmental organizations. He is or has been a member on several corporate boards, being particularly associated with Rogers Communications where he has been a director since 1991. In 2006, Peterson was named to the board of Shoppers Drug Mart at the time of the firm's acquisition by Loblaws. In his legal practice he provides international advice to a wide range of clients about public policy issues and government affairs in Canada.

In 1999, Peterson was at the centre of controversy due to his membership on the board of YBM Magnex, a firm which was discovered to have links to the Russian mafia. Peterson maintained that he was unaware of illegal activities at the company, and referred to the accusations against him as "guilt by association". A subsequent investigation by the Ontario Securities Commission found that Peterson's actions met "the legal test of due diligence", but expressed disappointment that he had not shown more leadership on the board.

A 2004 report from The Globe and Mail newspaper noted that Peterson was chastened by this experience, and had become "a cautious and more conscientious director" since that time. The same article further claimed that he has "no influence outside of Toronto".

On May 26, 2020, a group of Toronto investors known as NordStar Capital, announced a proposal to acquire TorStar Corporation the parent company of the Toronto Star, for C$52-million. Peterson was announced as part of the NordStar team. The bid was later improved to $60 million and was approved by courts and shareholders by early August 2020. Peterson took a senior advisory role at the Toronto Star as vice-chair of the Torstar board of directors and as of 2024 is chair of Torstar, the publisher of the Toronto Star.

Academic offices
| Preceded by Vivienne Poy | Chancellor of the University of Toronto; 2006–2012 | Succeeded by Michael Wilson |
