= List of Canadian films before 1920 =

This is a list of Canadian films before 1920.

== 1890s ==
Title	Director	Cast	Genre	Notes
1898
Ten Years in Manitoba	James Freer	James Freer	Documentary	lost film

== 1900s ==
Title	Director	Cast	Genre	Notes
1903
Hiawatha, the Messiah of the Ojibway	Joe Rosenthal		Short	lost film

== 1910s ==
Title	Director	Cast	Genre	Notes
1912
Battle of the Long Sault	Frank Crane	Frank Crane	Short drama	Made with the Kanehnawaga First Nations
1914
Evangeline	Edward P. Sullivan, William H. Cavanaugh	Laura Lyman, John T. Carleton, E.P. Sullivan	Drama based on the Longfellow poem	
In the Land of the Head Hunters	Edward S. Curtis	Maggie Frank	Documentary	
1915
Canada's Fighting Forces	D.J. Dwyer			Government of Canada World War I propaganda film
1916
British Columbia for the Empire	A. D. Kean		Compilation	Recruiting and training of British Columbia military units, and their departures for service in WWI.
Self-Defence	Charles Roos	Albert Grupe	Docudrama	It depicts a fictitious German invasion of Canada.
1919
Back to God's Country	David Hartford	Nell Shipman, Charles Arling, Wheeler Oakman, Wellington Playter	Drama	Produced by Nell and Ernest Shipman
Whaling: British Columbia's Least Known and Most Romantic Industry	A. D. Kean		Documentary short	Depicts the whaling industry on the Pacific coast, with scenes filmed off Vancouver Island (1916–17) and the Queen Charlotte Islands (1917–19).

== See also ==
- Top 10 Canadian Films of All Time
- List of Quebec films
- List of years in Canadian television
- List of Canadian submissions for the Academy Award for Best Foreign Language Film
