= Policing the Plains =

1927 film by Arthur D. Kean

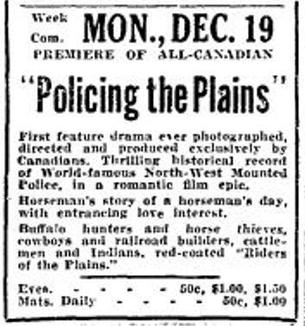
- Toronto newspaper ad for the premiere
- Directed by: Arthur D. Kean
- Written by: Arthur D. Kean
- Based on: Policing the Plains by Roderick G. MacBeth
- Produced by: Arthur D. Kean
- Starring: Jack Downing; Dorothy Fowler; Joe Fleiger; Col. T. A. Wroughton
- Cinematography: Arthur D. Kean
- Edited by: Arthur D. Kean
- Production companies: Western Pictures Company (1924-25); Policing the Plains Productions Ltd. (1925-27)
- Release date: 19 December 1927
- Running time: ca. 120 min
- Country: Canada
- Language: Silent (English intertitles)
- Budget: $125,000

Policing the Plains is a 1927 Canadian silent historical docudrama film directed by Arthur D. Kean and based on the book of the same name by Roderick G. MacBeth. It depicted the first fifty years of the Royal North-West Mounted Police.

Kean purchased the films rights to MacBeth's book two years after a separate company's unsuccessful attempt at adapting it. He originally planned for a six-reel film at a cost of $40,000, but it grew to eight-reels and $125,000 over the course of its filming over three years and five months. Kean filmed on location in western Canada and utilized the celebration of Macleod's 50th-anniversary.

The film's release date was delayed from the 1924 British Empire Exhibition to the 1927 Canadian National Exhibition before being shown once at the Royal Alexandra Theatre. The full film has since been lost since 1937, and one reel is believed to have been destroyed in a 1967 National Film Board of Canada vault fire.

== Plot ==
The film depicted episodes from the first fifty years of the RNWMP's existence, including: the Cypress Hills Massacre; the force's creation and March West; the force's relations with Indigenous peoples on the prairies; the founding of Fort Macleod; the pursuit of whisky traders and horse thieves; the building of the Canadian Pacific Railway; the Canadian sojourn of Sitting Bull and his followers; the Klondike Gold Rush; and modern police methods used in the 1920s.

== Cast ==
- Jack Downing as Corporal
- Dorothy Fowler as Canadian Girl
- Joe Fleiger as Jerry Potts
- T. A. Wroughton as Officer
- Alfred Crump as Officer Commanding Police
- James G. Harrison as Sergeant Major
- Donald Hayes as Officer of Police
- Senior Heaton as Canadian Statesman
- Norman Randall as Indian Scout
- Margaret Lougheed as Britannia

The cast members were almost all non-professionals; many were recruited more for their ability to ride and handle horses convincingly than for any noteworthy acting ability. In addition, members of the Blood First Nation appeared in several crowd, camp, and action scenes, wearing traditional dress and riding their own horses. They made Kean an honorary chief and gave him the name Oh-Mach-Ka-Si-Na-Ki ("The One Who Writes With Pictures").

== Production ==
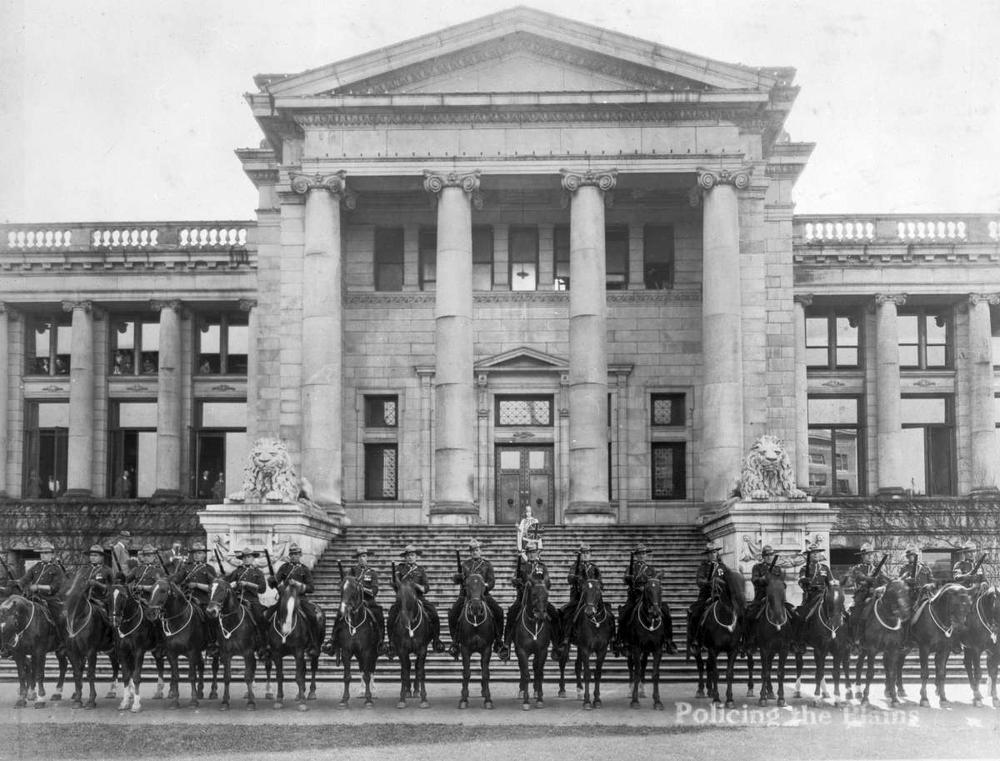
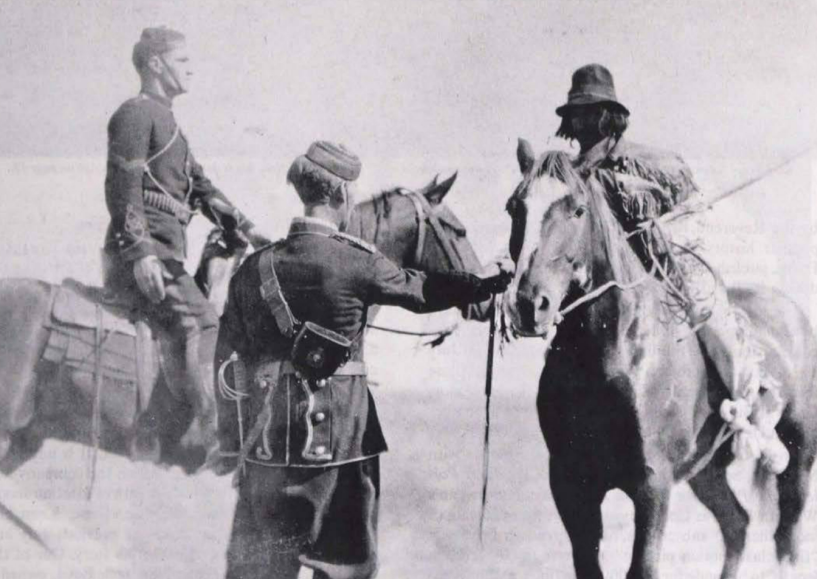
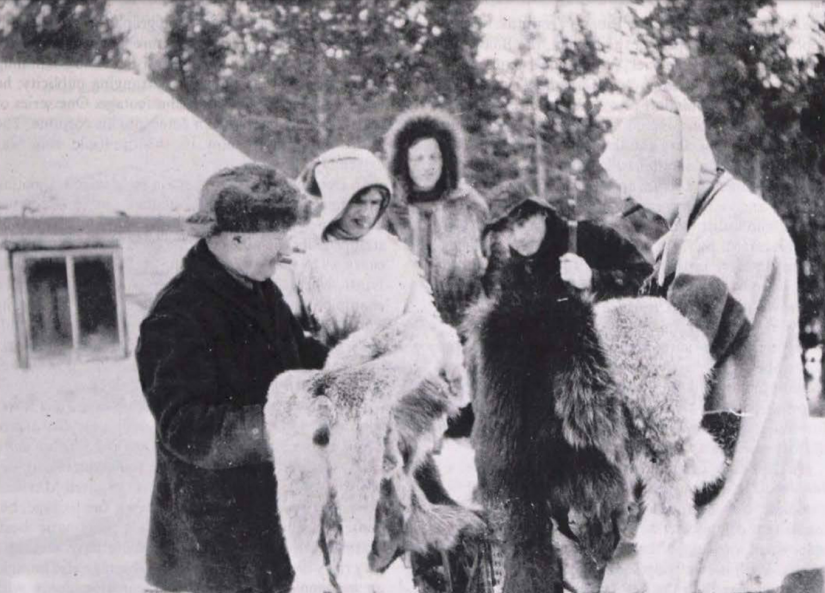
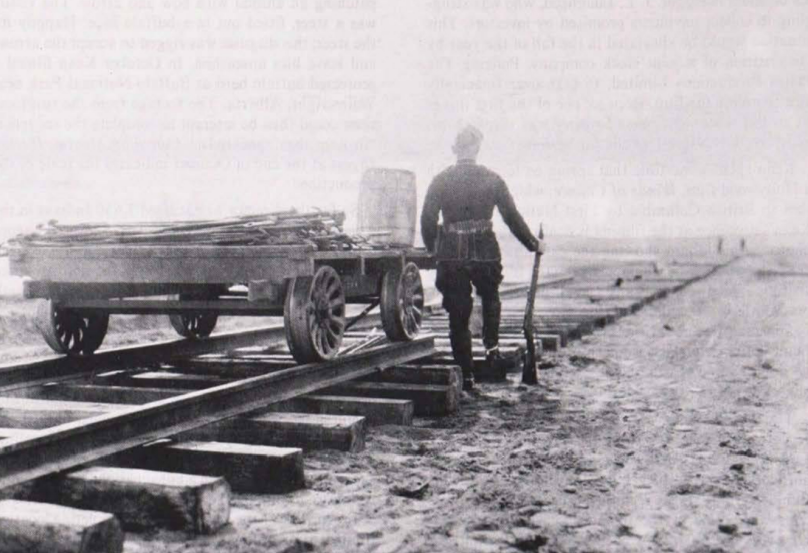
A collection of scenes from the film

In 1922, Canadian Historic Features Limited made plans to adapt R. G. MacBeth's Policing the Plains with the involvement of Harwood Steele, the son of pioneer Mountie Sam Steele, but the film was not made.

On 28 January 1924, Arthur D. Kean purchased the rights to MacBeth's book for $5,000 (equivalent to $91,222 in 2025). Kean planned for a six-reel (6,000-foot) film with a budget of $40,000, but production difficulties increased the final cost to over $125,000 as it grew to an eight-reel film.

Kean was the project's screenwriter, producer, director, cinematographer, and editor; he also handled publicity and some of the fund-raising duties. Kean believed in the ideal of a Canadian film industry that would celebrate Canadian and British history, values, and institutions. He also intended the film as a corrective to the clichéd and inaccurate portrayal of the RNWMP and its members in the numerous "Mountie movies" that were churned out by Hollywood studios during the silent era. Through personal contacts, he was able to secure the co-operation of the RCMP, including the loan of period-accurate uniforms and equipment. Assistant Commissioner T. A. Wroughton, of the RCMP's "E" Division, served as the film's technical advisor, and led a squad of Mounties shown in the opening scenes.

The Western Pictures Company announced Policing the Plains in March 1924, and planned a summer release at the British Empire Exhibition. However, the film suffered delays due to a host of financial, logistical, and technical difficulties. Much of the outdoor action was filmed on the Blood Indian Reserve near Macleod.

Filming was supposed to begin at Grouse Mountain, representing the Chilkoot Pass, but it is unknown if this sequence was actually shot. Filming at Green Lake near 70 Mile House started in March 1924. A nearby ranch belonging to Jack Boyd, a rodeo champion and cast member, was used as headquarters for multiple winter scenes. Modern-day scenes for the film's introduction were shot in downtown Vancouver.

In July, the production moved to southwestern Alberta for several months. The town of Macleod was holding its 50th-anniversary celebration at the time, and Kean took advantage of the occasion to obtain background colour and scenery for his feature. Many scenes were shot in the Macleod area, especially on the Blood Reserve. A replica of Fort Macleod was constructed across the river from the fort's original site. Early in 1925, more winter and mountain scenes were shot in and around Banff, Alberta.

A horseback jump off a cliff attributed to Jerry Potts was recreated by the film on 27 August 1924, by pushing a dummy horse and rider off a 150 foot cliff. 100 people from Macleod witnessed the stunt.

In March 1925, Kean asked Grant Hall, vice-president of the Canadian Pacific Railway, for an investment of $10,000; Hall declined after seeing some of the footage. Policing The Plains Productions Limited was formed to strengthen the film's finances. Later in 1925, Kean reshot some scenes on the Blood Reserve, and filmed a buffalo herd at Buffalo National Park in October. Canadian Moving Picture Digest reported that Kean had used 1,650 natives, 75 covered wagons, 2,000 horses, and 1,500 cattle by October 1925. These figures seem exaggerated, and that quality is typical of Kean's often bombastic publicity for the project.

There are no known references to the film’s production during 1926. In early 1927, however, Kean resumed shooting on the BC coast. Between February and April, he shot and re-shot sequences on Vancouver Island; these scenes dealt with drug smuggling, with Victoria Harbour and other local waterfronts used as locations. In April or May, he was filming near the RCMP barracks in Point Grey, where another stockade replica had been erected for re-takes of the whiskey trader sequence. Additional footage was also shot on a farm in Ladner, south of Vancouver.

In April 1927, Kean mortgaged the 16,000 feet of existing footage for a $3,500 loan to finance the film's completion. Interior scenes were shot that summer in Trenton, Ontario, at the studios of the Ontario Motion Picture Bureau. Principal photography was finally completed in August after three years and five months.

== Release ==
Kean planned to show the finished film at the 1927 Canadian National Exhibition, but problems in developing the footage made him miss the deadline. In September 1927, he screened the first half of the film at the Victoria Memorial Museum in Ottawa at the annual convention of the Association of Canadian Clubs.

The completed film was eventually screened for a week at the Royal Alexandra Theatre in Toronto, Ontario, from December 19 to 24, 1927. Kean had tried to rent the theatre for two weeks, but the booking was cut to one week by the American owners of the theatre chain. After this financially unsuccessful premiere, he was unable to secure further exhibition and distribution for the picture. The mixed reviews from Toronto probably didn't help matters. The Toronto Globe reviewer was enthusiastic, calling the film "a triumph for Canadian enterprise." The Daily Star praised its apparent verisimilitude, but criticized its lack of "dramatic technique." Kean stated that Famous Players refused to show the film and was critical of the American monopoly over the Canadian theatre industry.

Augustus Bridle stated that the film had "remarkable first-hand scenes from Canadian western life that no other producer has ever been able to assemble".

== Preservation status and legacy ==
Policing the Plains is considered to be a lost film. The last confirmed location of the negative was in the vault of the Ontario Board of Censors of Motion Pictures in 1937. It is believed that one reel of the film was destroyed in a 1967 fire at the National Film Board of Canada's vault in Kirkland, Quebec.

The A. D. Kean fonds (PR- 0755) at the BC Archives/Royal BC Museum includes more than a hundred production stills from the film, as well as some of the production paperwork.

Kean left the film industry after this failure and moved to the Toronto area, where he worked as a broadcaster, journalist, photographer, and horse trainer. In 1930, the Canadian government, under the Combines Investigation Act, began investigating monopolies in the film industry. On 2 March 1931, Kean testified about the difficulties of screening and distributing Policing the Plains, and stated that he was happy to be "out of movies and in the newspaper business".

Filmmaker Gordon Sparling stated that Kean's commitment to the film despite its production problems was "a good example of someone with a burning light ahead of him, trying to accomplish something". Historian Colin Browne wrote that Kean "appears to have worked with singular vision and enthusiasm long before people thought of a film as a director's medium".

== Works cited ==
- Duffy, Dennis J.; Mattison, David (1989). "A.D. Kean: Canada's Cowboy Movie-Maker". The Beaver. Vol. 69, no. 1. Hudson's Bay Company. pp. 28–41.
- Lester, Peter (2014). "Canada's Lost Frontier Epic: The Stillborn Saga of Policing the Plains". In Druick, Zoe; Cammaer, Gerda (eds.). Cinephemera: Archives, Ephemeral Cinema, and New Screen Histories in Canada. McGill–Queen's University Press. pp. 22–38.
- "Montreal". Boxoffice. Vol. 34, no. 21. Associated Publications. 1939.
- "Canadian Historic Feature, LTD., Producing "Policing The Plains"". Canadian Moving Picture Digest. Vol. 14, no. 10. Dominion Embossing and Printing Company. 1922.
- "Hollywood's Stranglehold On Canada, Say Canadians". Variety. Vol. 89, no. 11. 1927.
