= Whaling: British Columbia's Least Known and Most Romantic Industry =

1910s silent black-and-white documentary film by A. D. Kean

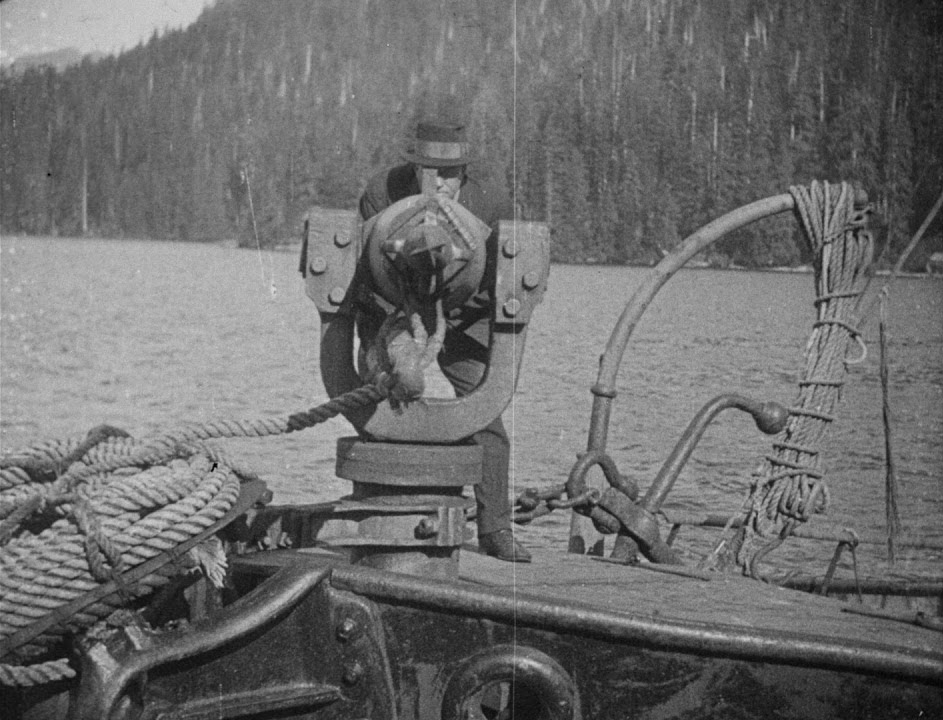
- The "business end" of a harpoon cannon on a steam whaler. (Digital frame grab from A. D. Kean's Whaling.)
- Directed by: A. D. Kean
- Written by: A. D. Kean
- Produced by: A. D. Kean
- Cinematography: A. D. Kean
- Edited by: A. D. Kean
- Production company: Kean's Canada Films
- Distributed by: Ford Canadian Monthly; BC Patriotic and Educational Picture Service
- Release date: December 4, 1916 (Victoria)
- Running time: 16 minutes 45 seconds
- Country: Canada
- Language: Silent (intertitles)

Whaling: British Columbia's Least Known and Most Romantic Industry is a silent black-and-white documentary film produced by Vancouver filmmaker A. D. Kean in the years 1916–1919. It is an early example of Canadian documentary filmmaking, and is the most complete of Kean's surviving productions. It is probably the earliest extant film to depict steam whaling on the west coast of North America.

The original release version (1916) was promoted under the titles Whaling in Northern British Columbia and The Great Whale Hunt. The surviving version (with its much longer title) was presumably released in 1920 or 1921 by the British Columbia Patriotic and Educational Picture Service.

== Filming ==
After starting his filmmaking career early in 1914, Kean soon became involved in recording the various industries of British Columbia. In the fall of 1916, he obtained permission to film aboard vessels of the Victoria Whaling Company.

1916: Kean left Victoria, BC, in late September aboard the whaling tender Gray and traveled to the company's whaling station at Kyuquot, on the west coast of Vancouver Island. Here he filmed the arrival of dead whales, and the "flensing" and processing of the carcasses by Japanese workers. He then went out with Captain Willis Balcom aboard the whaler Black and filmed other vessels pursuing whales on the open sea. On the third morning out, Balcom successfully harpooned a whale that fought for three hours before expiring. The Black then towed its catch back to the station for processing.

1917: In April, Kean went out on the whaler William Grant from Sechart whaling station on Vancouver Island's west coast. From the brief published description, the footage shot appears to have covered the same subjects as those filmed in 1916. In July, he again sailed from Victoria on the Gray, which stopped at Kyuquot before proceeding to Rose Harbour whaling station on Kunghit Island in the Queen Charlotte Islands (now known as Haida Gwaii). The filming objective on this trip was mainly the sea lion colony off Cape St. James (at the southern tip of the Kunghit Island); he sailed there with Captain William Heater on the William Grant.

1919: While sailing on BC's northern coast and Queen Charlotte Islands with Dr. C. R. Marlatt, Kean visited Rose Harbour again in August. He took his movie camera out in a whaler that hunted off Cape St. James.

== Summary ==
Whaling shows the preparation of harpoons and equipment; the search for whales; the pursuit, harpooning, and killing of a whale; and all aspects of the flensing and processing of carcasses at the whaling station (the latter shown in graphic detail). The film includes shots of the Rose Harbour whaling station on Haida Gwaii, presumably shot in 1917 or 1919, along with footage and inter-titles which match the descriptions of the Vancouver Island footage in Kean's 1916 article "Whale Hunting."

== Versions ==
The 1916 version was first screened in early December at the Dominion Theatres in Victoria and Vancouver. A newspaper ad for the Victoria screening bills the film as Whaling in Northern British Columbia and includes the tagline "Special Local Pictures Showing Victoria's Whalers at Sea." A screening at Vancouver's Broadway Theatre later in December advertised the film as "The Great Whale Hunt off the coast of Vancouver Island." Kean sold the Canadian exhibition rights (for the 1916 version) to the newsreel Ford Canadian Monthly.

It appears that Kean re-edited his film in 1917 and 1919 (and possibly later) to incorporate new and better footage as it became available, including the scenes filmed on and around Haida Gwaii.

The end title of the surviving film shows a variant British Columbia flag (the 1907 Canadian Red Ensign with an additional BC coat of arms at upper right), and superimposed text that reads "British Columbia Government Films." This logo indicates that the extant version was distributed by the short-lived BC Patriotic and Educational Picture Service in the years 1920–22. In fact, one newspaper item implies that Kean was still adding new footage to the film in 1921.

== Preservation status ==
The surviving version, under the main title above, is preserved in the Ernest Belton collection at Library and Archives Canada (LAC) in Ottawa. The 35mm master is 1131 feet in length and runs 16 minutes 45 seconds (at the "silent speed" of 18 frames per second).
