= Roderick G. MacBeth =

Canadian author and lecturer (1858–1934)

Roderick George MacBeth M.A., D.D., LLD
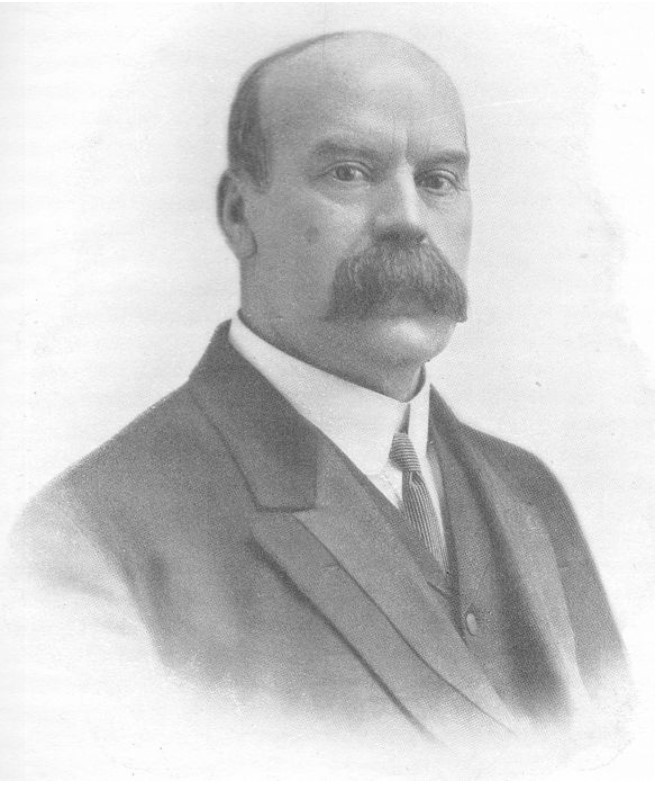
- Rev. Roderick George MacBeth
- Born: 21 December 1858; Kildonan (Winnipeg), Red River Settlement (Manitoba)
- Died: 28 February 1934 (aged 75); Vancouver, British Columbia
- Occupations: Author; Minister; Historian
- Writing career
- Notable works: The Selkirk Settlers in Real Life (1897); The Making of the Canadian West (1898); Our Task in Canada (1912); Empire of the North (1912); The Romance of Western Canada (1918); Policing the Plains (1921); The Romance of the Canadian Pacific Railway (1924); The Burning Bush and Canada (1925)

Roderick George MacBeth (21 December 1858 – 28 February 1934), was a Canadian author, Presbyterian Minister, lecturer, and historian.

== Life ==
Roderick George MacBeth (conversely spelt McBeth) was born on 21 December 1858 in Kildonan, Red River Settlement to Mary McLean and Robert McBeth, a Justice of the peace and member of the Council of Assiniboia. MacBeth's father and grandfather, Alexander McBeth - one of the 23 survivors of the Black Hole of Calcutta -, moved to Kildonan from Sutherlandshire, Scotland, in 1815 with a party of Selkirk Settlers.

=== Early life and education ===
MacBeth was educated at local parish schools and later public schools in the Red River Settlement. In 1878, he began his studies at Manitoba College, then part of the University of Manitoba. In 1882, MacBeth obtained his Bachelor of Arts and Bachelor of Laws, followed by a Master of Arts in 1885. In 1885, while studying at Manitoba College, he enlisted in the Canadian Militia and served with the Winnipeg Light Infantry under General Thomas Bland Strange during the North-West Rebellion. He marched across the prairies, going as far west as Calgary and Fort Edmonton. For his service, he was awarded a medal.

Upon graduation, MacBeth opted to pursue a career in law and he was called to the Manitoba bar in 1886. However, this career was short lived and he quickly abandoned the field of law to pursue a ministerial education, first at Manitoba College and then Princeton Theological Seminary. He was ordained as a minister by the Presbyterian Church in 1891.

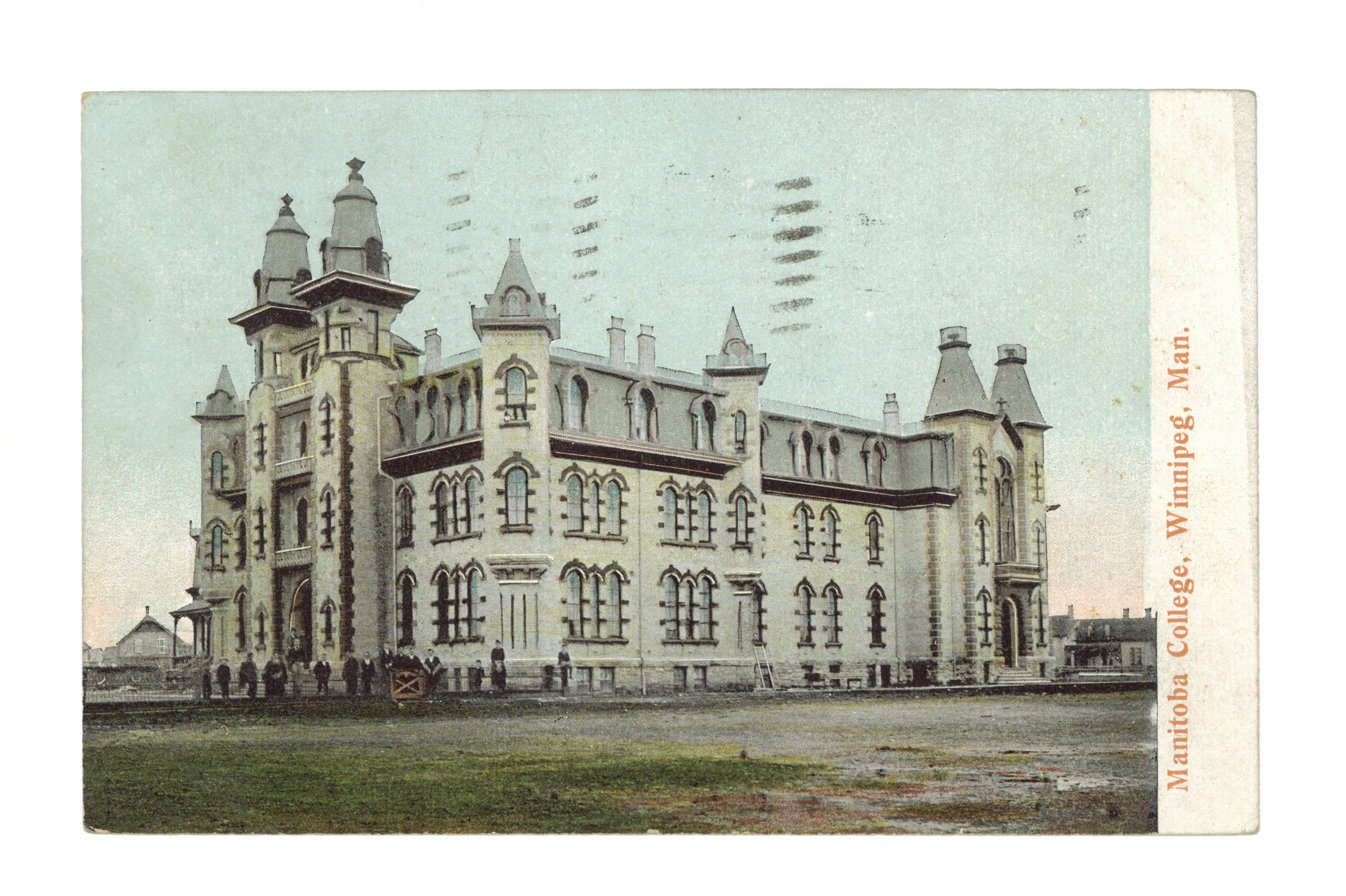
Manitoba College, Winnipeg, Manitoba. Constructed in 1882

In 1886, MacBeth married Christina Ellen Sutherland. The marriage was short, as Sutherland died the following year. MacBeth remarried in 1896 to Elizabeth Patterson. The couple had four children together and remained married until MacBeth's death in 1934.

=== Church career ===
Following his ordination, MacBeth served several congregations in Manitoba, including in Winnipeg at the Augustine Presbyterian Church where he served as Second Minister from 1891 to 1900. In 1900, he relocated to Vancouver to serve as First Minister of First Church. Following a short four-year stint in Vancouver, MacBeth moved to Paris, Ontario where he ministered from 1904 to 1914. He returned to Vancouver to accept a call from St Paul's Presbyterian Church, where he stayed until his retirement in 1932.

A proponent of the Social Gospel movement, MacBeth often preached on matters of temperance, materialism, criminality, and behaviours such as swearing and gambling. He was also staunchly opposed to the Presbyterian Church of Canada joining with other Protestant denominations and lectured heavily on the subject of an independent Presbyterian Church. Following the creation of the United Church in 1925 which amalgamated some Presbyterian congregations, MacBeth continued to support an independent Presbyterian Church.

MacBeth was also commissioned by the Presbyterian Church to produce reports for the church's home mission board on issues facing the church and congregations in northern and frontier regions of the Canadian west and north. Several of these reports were published in book form, including Our Task in Canada (1912) and Empire of the North (1912). Both works were well received by the Presbyterian Church community, with Our Task in Canada being lauded as "an excellent summary of the problems and work of our Church in our own land." These were followed by The Burning Bush and Canada in 1925.

=== Literary works ===
MacBeth's first foray into writing was in 1897 when he published The Selkirk Settlers in Real Life, a semi-autobiographical retelling of the history of the Selkirk Colony and his family's history in the Canadian west. This was followed by The Making of the Canadian West: Being the Reminiscences of an Eye-witness in 1898. The Making of the Canadian West was an autobiographical account of MacBeth's life growing up in the prairie west and covered a breadth of topics including the fur trade, the construction of the Canadian Pacific Railway, and the settlement of the prairies. It and The Selkirk Settlers in Real Life were well received. These were followed by The Romance of Western Canada (1918), Policing the Plains (1921) and The Romance of the Canadian Pacific Railway (1924).

In addition to his standalone published works, MacBeth was an active member of the Manitoba Historical Society and occasionally wrote articles for the society's journal, MHS Transactions, mainly on subjects pertaining to farming and the Selkirk Colony. He was also a frequent author of magazine and newspaper articles, including letter series detailing his travels throughout Canada. Several of his letter series "seemed to be of interest to so many" that they were published in book form, including Recent Canadian West Letters: Historical and Descriptive (1912) and Peace River Letters (1915).

MacBeth received wide praise from both the Presbyterian community and Canadian public for his literary works. Indeed, Policing the Plains proved so popular that in 1924, Arthur D. Kean purchased the rights for turning the book into a historical film. In 1927, the film, titled Policing the Plains, was released. Although lauded for its authenticity, Policing the Plains received mixed reviews and was a commercial failure.

=== Death ===
In June of 1933, MacBeth suffered a severe stroke, significantly impacting his health. He died less than a year later on 28 February 1934 in Vancouver. He is buried in Kildonan Presbyterian Cemetery in Winnipeg. Tributes following his passing were posted in newspapers across Canada.

=== Recognition and awards ===
In 1929, MacBeth was awarded an honorary LLD degree from the University of Manitoba for his literary works. In 1930, he was chosen as a speaker for Manitoba's Diamond jubilee.

== Bibliography ==
- The Selkirk Settlers in Real Life (Toronto: William Briggs, 1897)
- The Making of the Canadian West: Being the Reminiscences of an Eyewitness (Toronto: William Briggs, 1898)
- Our Task in Canada (Toronto: Presbyterian Home Mission Board, 1912)
- Empire of the North: Northern Ontario Letters (Toronto: Temiskaming and Northern Ontario Railway Commission, 1912)
- Recent Canadian West Letters: Historical and Descriptive (Brantford: Hurley Printing Co., 1912)
- Peace River Letters (Vancouver: White and Bindon, 1915)
- The Romance of Western Canada (Toronto: William Briggs, 1918)
- Policing the Plains: Being the Real Life Record of the Famous North-West Mounted Police (Toronto: Hodder & Stoughton, 1921)
- The Romance of the Canadian Pacific Railway (Toronto: Ryerson Press, 1924)
- The Burning Bush and Canada (Westminster: John M. Poole, 1925)
- Sir Augustus Nanton: A Biography (Toronto: MacMillan Co. of Canada, 1931)

== Sources ==
- Augustine Congregation, One Hundred Years of Augustine, 1887–1987 (Winnipeg, MB: Augustine Congregation, 1987)
- John M. Bumsted, Dictionary of Manitoba Biography (Winnipeg, MB: University of Manitoba Press, 1999)
- Dennis J. Duffy, and David Mattison, “A. D. Kean: Canada’s Cowboy Movie-Maker,” The Beaver 69, no. 1 (1989): 28–41.
- Gordon Goldsborough, "Memorable Manitobans: Roderick George McBeth [MacBeth] (1858–1934)," Manitoba Historical Society Archives
- Clarence Karr, "MacBETH, RODERICK GEORGE," Dictionary of Canadian Biography, vol. 16, 2003
- Manitoba Library Association, Memorable Manitobans: Pioneers and Early Citizens of Manitoba, A Dictionary of Manitoba Biography from the Earliest Times to 1920 (Winnipeg, Manitoba: Peguis Publishers)
- Presbyterian Record 37, no. 12 (1912): 530.
- Presbyterian Record 59, no. 4 (1934): 104–108.
