= May Watkis =

Canadian film agency director

- Born: Hilda May Gowen; July 22, 1879; Victoria, British Columbia
- Died: December 6, 1940 (aged 61)
- Occupations: clerk, film projectionist, amusement tax inspector
- Years active: 1913-1940

May Gowen Watkis (née Hilda May Gowen; 1879-1940) served as a projectionist, clerk, and tax inspector at various agencies of the British Columbia government during the years 1913-40. In 1920-21, she was briefly employed as a clerk in the Vancouver office of the British Columbia Patriotic and Educational Picture Service (PEPS), under the service's director, Dr. Albert Richard Baker. In May 1921, she was the subject of an article written by Edith Cuppage for Maclean's Magazine. Cuppage described Watkis as the head or "directress" of the Picture Service. This erroneous information about May Watkis has been repeated in a number of books and articles on Canadian film history, which describe her as the director of the Patriotic and Educational Picture Service and the producer of its films.

== Career ==
British Columbia was one of the first provinces to establish a film censorship office, bringing with it career opportunities. Watkis was determined to become join the film industry, but did not believe she would make it as an actress. In 1913, Watkis applied to become a film censor, however, the attorney-general of the time rejected her application and gave the position to a man. Undeterred, Watkis offered her services to the new censor as his assistant, and he hired her as his projectionist. Although Watkis knew nothing about projecting films, she agreed.

The British Columbia projectionists' union refused to teach her, as projection was considered to be a man's profession. Across the border in Washington state, she again faced an all-male union that refused to teach her. Instead, Watkis convinced a friend who worked at a local theatre to explain the techniques for projecting films without explaining why she wanted to know, and alongside him projected several shows.

Impressed by Watkis's determination, the new censor officially hired her as his assistant. In response to this, the projectionists' union unsuccessfully protested for a month.

After a time, Watkis grew bored with her duties, and she became an inspector for the BC Theatres Branch. Her job was to check for breaches of the Amusement Tax Act. She also claimed to have worked in California in the scenario departments for Hollywood production companies. In 1920, some months after the creation of the B.C. Patriotic and Educational Picture Service, Watkis was transferred to the new agency as a clerk under its director, Dr. A. R. Baker.

In newspaper interviews published in late 1920 and early 1921, Watkis presented herself as an authority on the film industry and a senior decision-maker at PEPS. These stories probably got traction due to the novelty of a woman supposedly running a government department. Nonetheless, the articles appeared in Vancouver newspapers that regularly reported on the work of PEPS, and on the activities of Dr. Baker and the PEPS cinematographer, A. D. "Cowboy" Kean. The most prominent information source about May Watkis—Edith Cuppage's 1921 profile in Maclean's Magazine—was not properly researched; Cuppage seems to have simply accepted what she was told by Watkis.

A few months after the Maclean's profile appeared, Watkis was quietly transferred from PEPS back to her position as inspector at the Amusement Tax Office. She worked for that department until her death in 1940.

== Mistaken Significance in Canadian Film History ==
Decades later, in his 1978 book Embattled Shadows: A History of Canadian Cinema, film historian Peter Morris repeated Cuppage's unsubstantiated claims and expanded on them, crediting Watkis as the producer/director of one of the few surviving PEPS films, Beautiful Ocean Falls (1920). Ironically, the latter film wasn't even an in-house production; it was made for PEPS by a commercial firm, Pathescope of Canada. Morris's account eventually led to a widely accepted belief that Watkis was an unsung Canadian filmmaking pioneer. But Watkis was never the director (or even assistant director) of PEPS, and she did not produce or direct films. Her name does not appear in the credits of Beautiful Ocean Falls. A. R. Baker, the actual director of the PEPS, wasn't mentioned at all in the Morris book. In her 1979 MA thesis, Juliet Thelma Pollard pointed out the discrepancies between the Cuppage/Morris version of the PEPS story and the significance of A. R. Baker, as revealed in newspaper coverage from the period.

The information about Watkis' actual role at PEPS was finally corrected by Mark Terry in a 2020 revision to his 2016 profile of Watkis on the Women Film Pioneers Project (WFPP) website. A further discussion of the controversy, written by WFPP manager Kate Saccone, appeared in Modernism/Modernity the same year.
