= British Columbia Patriotic and Educational Picture Service =

Defunct government agency in British Columbia, Canada

The British Columbia Patriotic and Educational Picture Service was a British Columbia provincial government agency founded in April 1920 by the Liberal government of Premier John Oliver. The picture service was created to produce, acquire, distribute, and exhibit motion pictures promoting British Columbia and Canada—and in so doing, to counter the nationalistic American content of Hollywood films. The legislation creating the service required that all BC theatres exhibit up to fifteen minutes of the service's films as part of each screening. Resistance to this requirement, coupled with the insertion of political propaganda into some of its films, made the picture service highly controversial. It ceased most production and distribution in 1922–23.

== Organization and film production ==
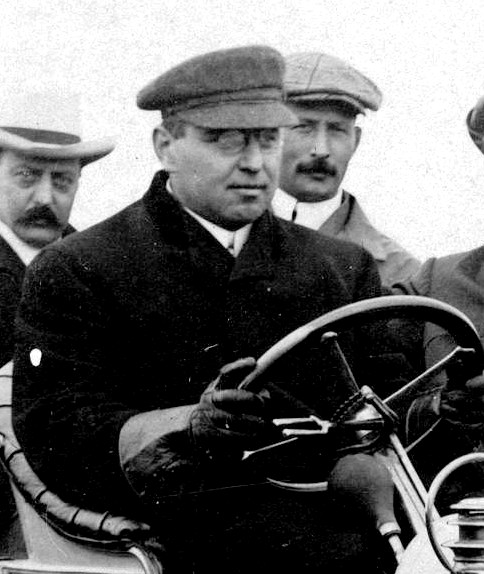
BCPEPS Director Dr. A. R. Baker, 1906. (Detail from City of Vancouver Archives photo AM54-S4-: Trans P55)

The Patriotic and Educational Picture Service (PEPS) was created under legislation entitled "The Moving Pictures Act Amendment Act" of 1920, as proposed by Premier Oliver's Attorney-General, J. W. de B. Farris. The appointed Director of PEPS was Dr. A. Richard Baker (1872–1941), a Vancouver dentist, who was also chairman of the provincial Game Conservation Board. The offices of both departments were in the Vancouver Courthouse on Georgia Street, which currently (2025) houses the Vancouver Art Gallery.

Unlike the Ontario Motion Picture Bureau (founded in 1917), which until 1923 acquired all its films from outside producers, the BC picture service had an in-house production capability from its inception. Most of its films were produced by Vancouver filmmaker A.D. "Cowboy" Kean. These included some pre-1920 films that he'd made for his own company (Kean's Canada Films) or under contract to the Game Conservation Board. Kean received a staff salary through the game board, and the picture service paid him by the foot for film he shot, processed, and printed. A smaller number of PEPS titles were purchased from Pathescope of Canada, a firm based in Toronto.

== Film distribution ==
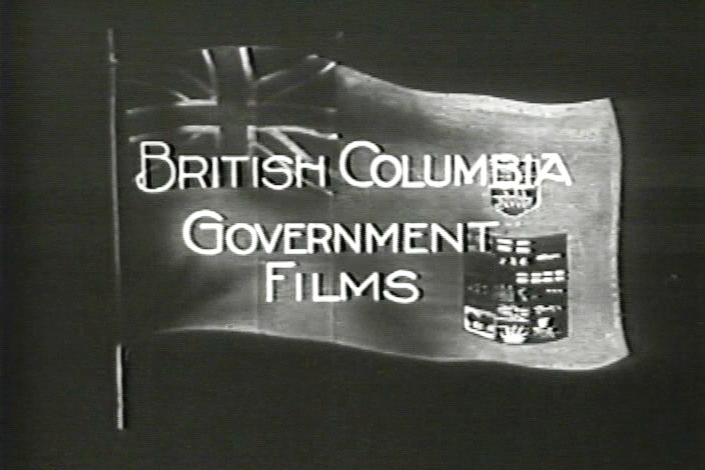
This logo appeared at the end of films distributed by PEPS. (Digital frame grab from Whaling [filmed 1916-19, released 1920]).

The films distributed by the picture service were intended to show British Columbia to British Columbians, as well as audiences in Great Britain and elsewhere. Individual films depicted the province’s industries and natural resources, as well as its scenic and recreational attractions, cities, towns, and transportation routes.

The release of PEPS films to BC theatres began in June 1920, with the stated intention of releasing eight new titles every two weeks. The theatres were required (as a condition of their provincial licenses) to exhibit up to fifteen minutes of PEPS films at each of their screenings. Many exhibitors pushed back against this requirement, denouncing the PEPS product as inferior in every way. Considerable criticism and ridicule was directed at the notion of showing BC to its own residents—although in this regard, PEPS foreshadowed (by twenty years) a key mandate of the National Film Board of Canada.

== The oyster film scandal ==
In November 1920, during a provincial election campaign, PEPS released the controversial film Profits from Oysters. Kean had produced an innocuous industrial short showing oyster and clam harvesting in Surrey by the Crescent Oyster Company. One of the company’s investors was W. J. Bowser, the leader of the provincial Conservative opposition. The film contained several shots of the company’s South Asian workers. Baker had Kean re-cut the film to highlight Bowser's connection to the oyster industry, remove any shots of white employees, and insert new inter-titles that repeatedly referred to the company's employees as “Hindus” rather than as "workers." (In fact, they were Sikhs.) The revised version was approved by Attorney-General Farris and other Liberal Party officials.

Given the xenophobic anti-Asian sentiment prevalent in the province at that time, being named as a prominent employer of South Asians would have made Bowser a pariah to white voters, and the government was likely counting on that. But the campaign seems to have backfired, at least in part. The major newspapers in Vancouver and Victoria all condemned Profits from Oysters as naked political propaganda, with the Vancouver Daily World denouncing the government’s strategy as “petty and contemptible.” In any case, however, Bowser’s Conservatives lost the election and Oliver’s Liberals were returned to power.

A year later, political conflict and accusations of malfeasance led to a Royal Commission of Inquiry into A. R. Baker's activities at both the game board and PEPS. Kean’s testimony before the inquiry provides fairly damning evidence of the film’s intended purpose. Ultimately, the inquiry exonerated Baker, but he resigned anyway. Its reputation damaged by the scandal, the picture service continued to function in a reduced capacity under the direction of BC Film Censor Walter Hepburn. In-house production stopped completely in 1923, although the legislation creating the service remained on the books for several years.

The last known PEPS-related film was The Cariboo Road (1926), produced for the government under the supervision of Baker and only shown publicly once.

== May Watkis and "directress" story ==
A misleading story has been circulating for decades about May Gowen Watkis (1879-1940), a clerk who served as Dr. Baker's administrative assistant from July 1920 to July 1921. In a poorly researched 1921 article in MacLean’s Magazine, writer Edith M. Cuppage described May Watkis as the “directress” of the picture service and implied that she was responsible for the production of its films. Unfortunately, some Canadian film historians, taking the MacLean’s story at face value, have promulgated and elaborated on this misinformation, crediting Watkis as the producer of Beautiful Ocean Falls (Pathescope of Canada, 1919) and other unspecified films. As a result, Watkis has been erroneously celebrated as a pioneer female Canadian filmmaker. Recent scholarship has endeavored to correct the misinformation about Watkis and her role at PEPS. Newspaper coverage from the period makes it quite clear that Baker was the one and only director of the service, and that Kean was the only filmmaker on staff.

== Selected filmography ==
Except where noted as "Extant," these titles—like virtually all of the PEPS films—are considered lost.

- British Columbia for the Empire (1914–16). Components of, or footage from, this WWI-era military compilation film show up in inventories of PEPS-circulated films. Two apparent component films survive at the LAC.†
- Wild Animal Life in British Columbia (1915–19). A compilation of wildlife footage, made by Kean in early 1915 and later expanded with further footage he shot in 1916–19. Purchased by the Game Conservation Board in 1919, after Kean was hired by the board.†
- Whaling: British Columbia's Least Known and Most Romantic Industry (1916–19 [or –21]). Extant.†
- The Story of Copper or Anyox, Story of Copper (Winter 1918–19).†
- Beautiful Ocean Falls (ca. 1920). Note: the linked LAC description includes inaccurate information from a secondary source. PEPS didn't release a series titled "Pacific Coast Scenics," and May Watkis didn't produce films. Pathescope of Canada. Extant.
- Travel Tour of the West Coast of Vancouver Isle (ca. 1920). Pathescope of Canada. Note: the LAC film description is incomplete, and the reference to "the Queen Charlotte Islands" is incorrect; Port Alice is on Vancouver Island. Extant.
- Glorious Garibaldi Park (1920), aka Mountain Climbing in British Columbia.
- The Land of Wonders Review (1920), aka Stanley Park. A dance recital, combined with park scenery.
- Pacific Great Eastern Railway (1920–21).
- Profits from Oysters (1920), aka Oyster Cultivation in British Columbia. Industrial short about the oyster industry, highlighting its employment of Asian labourers; used as political propaganda against Opposition leader W. J. Bowser in the 1920 BC provincial election.
- Mother's Pensions (1920).
- Board of Trade Excursion (1921). Scenic and industrial highlights of BC's northern coast.
- Nelson, Queen of the Kootenays (1921–22). Attractions of Nelson and area, with added footage of the Trail smelter and Bonnington Falls.
- [Gold mining at Cedar Creek] (1922). Filmed near Quesnel Lake in the Cariboo.
- The Cariboo Road (1926). Produced by A. R. Baker without Kean's involvement.

† = Films made independently by Kean before 1920, later picked up for distribution by PEPS.
