= British Columbia for the Empire =

1916 film by Arthur D. Kean

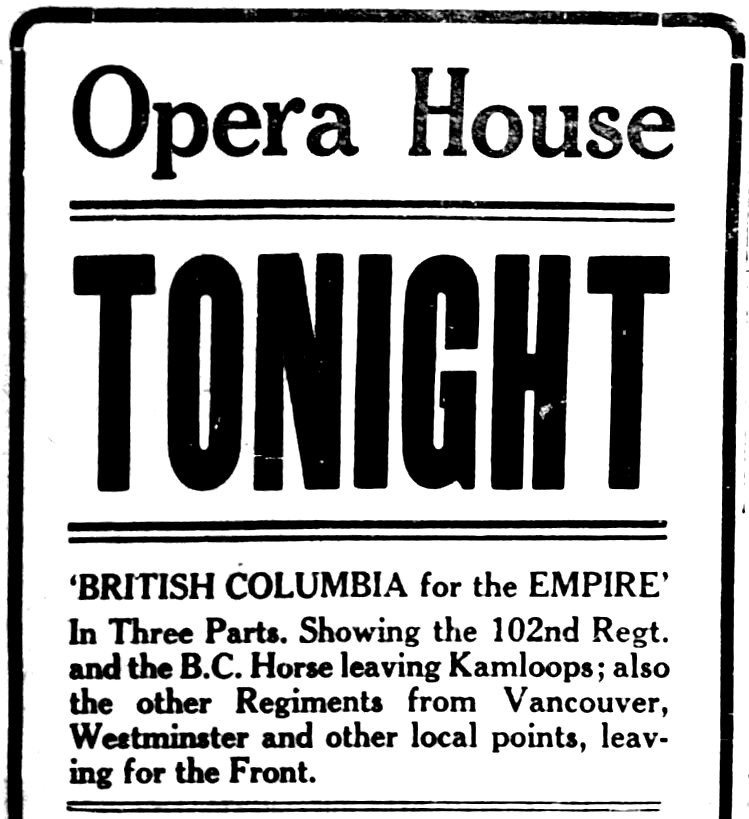
Newspaper ad for a screening of the film at the Opera House, Kamloops, BC. (Inland Sentinel, [Kamloops], 16 Feb. 1916, 4.)

British Columbia for the Empire was a Canadian feature-length silent documentary film produced in 1916 by Vancouver filmmaker Arthur D. Kean and released through his company, Kean's Canada Films. It was a compilation film, assembled from his theatrical shorts (shot in 1914–16) that depicted individual British Columbia battalions in training and departing for service in the First World War.

== Filming ==
Kean began filming the activities of BC military units immediately after Canada declared war in August 1914. The departures of battalions and regiments to join the Canadian Expeditionary Force (CEF) were reported in local and regional newspapers, and Kean's presence with his camera on such occasions was frequently noted. Screenings of his departure films were well-advertised and promoted in the same newspapers. In December 1916, Kean's project was described as "a complete pictorial record of every British Columbia battalion which has gone to the front during the present war," and "a more extensive military record of this description than is possessed by any other part of the British dominions."

== Versions ==
For many years, the only known reference to British Columbia for the Empire by title was in an issue of the film industry trade journal The Moving Picture World. Another reference, from a screening in Kamloops, has since been found.

These news items describe the film as three or four reels in length (approximately 3,000 to 4,000 feet of 35mm film); its running time would likely have been between 44 and 66 minutes. It was apparently shown in Vancouver, Victoria, and the BC Interior in a few different versions. One version, shown January 31–February 2, 1916, at Vancouver's Orpheum Theatre, was billed as "Special: Grand Military Review of BC's Part in the Great War; Most Comprehensive Shown." The latter included footage of the 16th Battalion (Canadian Scottish); the 29th Battalion (Vancouver), known as "Tobin's Tigers"; the 47th Battalion (British Columbia); the 62nd Battalion (British Columbia); and the 72nd Battalion (Seaforth Highlanders of Canada). It also contained footage showing the departure of the second contingent of the CEF; various guards of honour; and the reviewing of troops by Canada's Governor General, HRH the Duke of Connaught, and the Minister of Militia and Defence, General Sir Sam Hughes.

== Preservation status ==
Like most of Kean's other productions, British Columbia for the Empire has long since been lost or destroyed. However, a few of the related component films (which focus on individual units) have survived. Due to Kean's later close involvement with the British Columbia Patriotic and Educational Picture Service, it's likely that excerpts from his military footage were also distributed by the picture service in some form during its brief tenure (1920-23).

This film is listed in the Canadian Feature Film Database at Library and Archives Canada, under the title B.C. for the Empire. Its place within the chronology makes it one of the earliest Canadian feature-length films, and the first produced in British Columbia.
