= North-West Mounted Police in popular media =

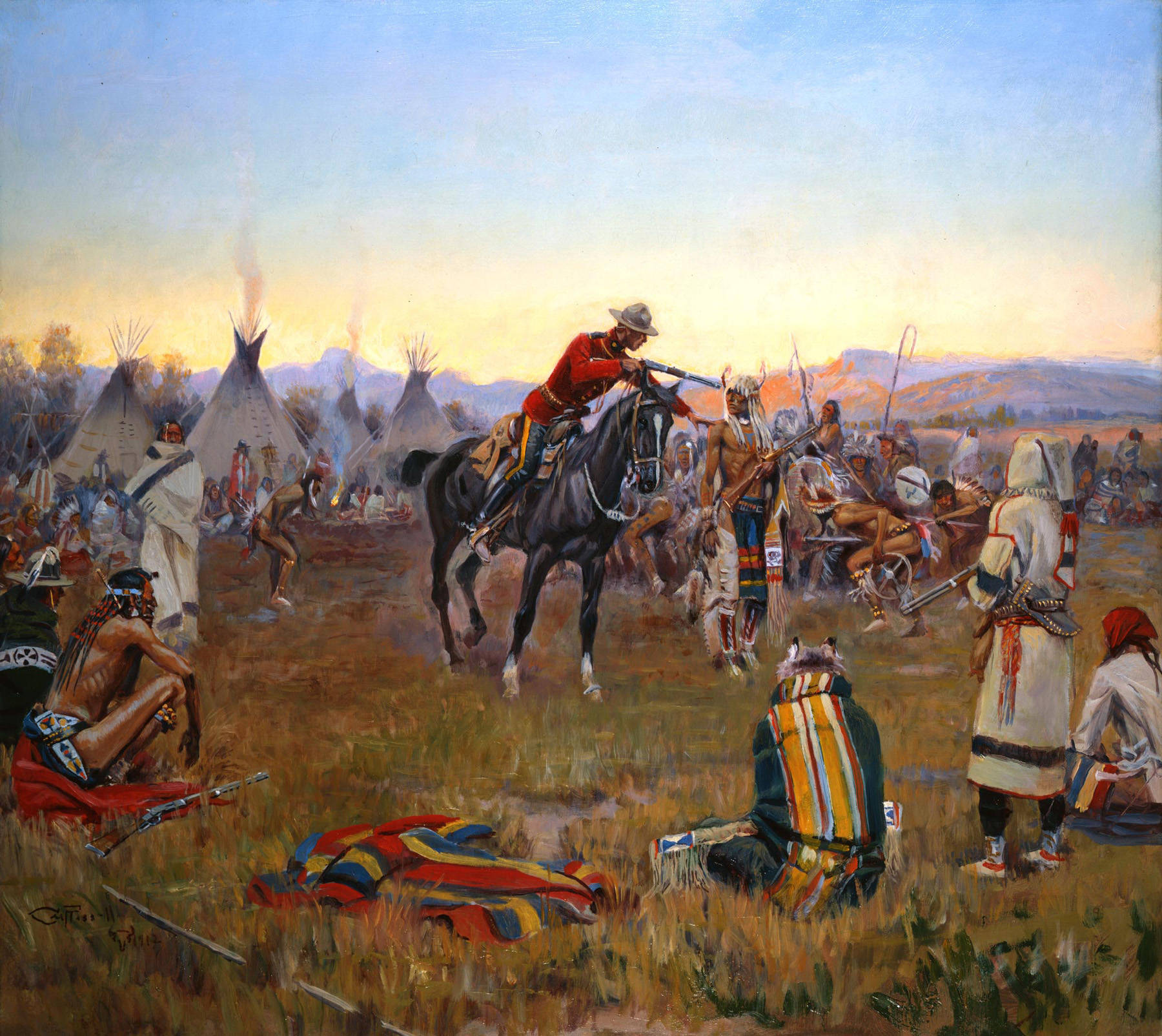
Single-Handed, a romanticised 1912 picture by Charles Russell showing a policeman apprehending a Blackfoot suspect

The Canadian North-West Mounted Police had a prominent role in popular media from the late 19th century onwards. The North-West Mounted Police (NWMP), founded in 1873, were initially viewed with scepticism by the press, but soon became portrayed in media and fictional accounts as courageous, disciplined and chivalrous, displaying a sense of fair-play as they brought their suspects to justice. In the 20th century, over 250 films were made about the force, along with radio and television portrayals.

== Early accounts ==
The early reputation of the NWMP was created by journalistic accounts of the force published in the 1880s and 1890s, followed by biographical and narrative accounts by retired NWMP officers. The initial press response was mixed, particularly among the Liberal media, and featured accounts of what Dawson describes as "inefficiency, irresolution and impropriety" within the new organisation. In contrast, the memoirs promoted an image of a tough, but fair, force, focused on maintaining order. Quite quickly, however, a more heroic, romantic tone took over within newspaper accounts and a powerful myth built up around the mounted police.

== Novels ==
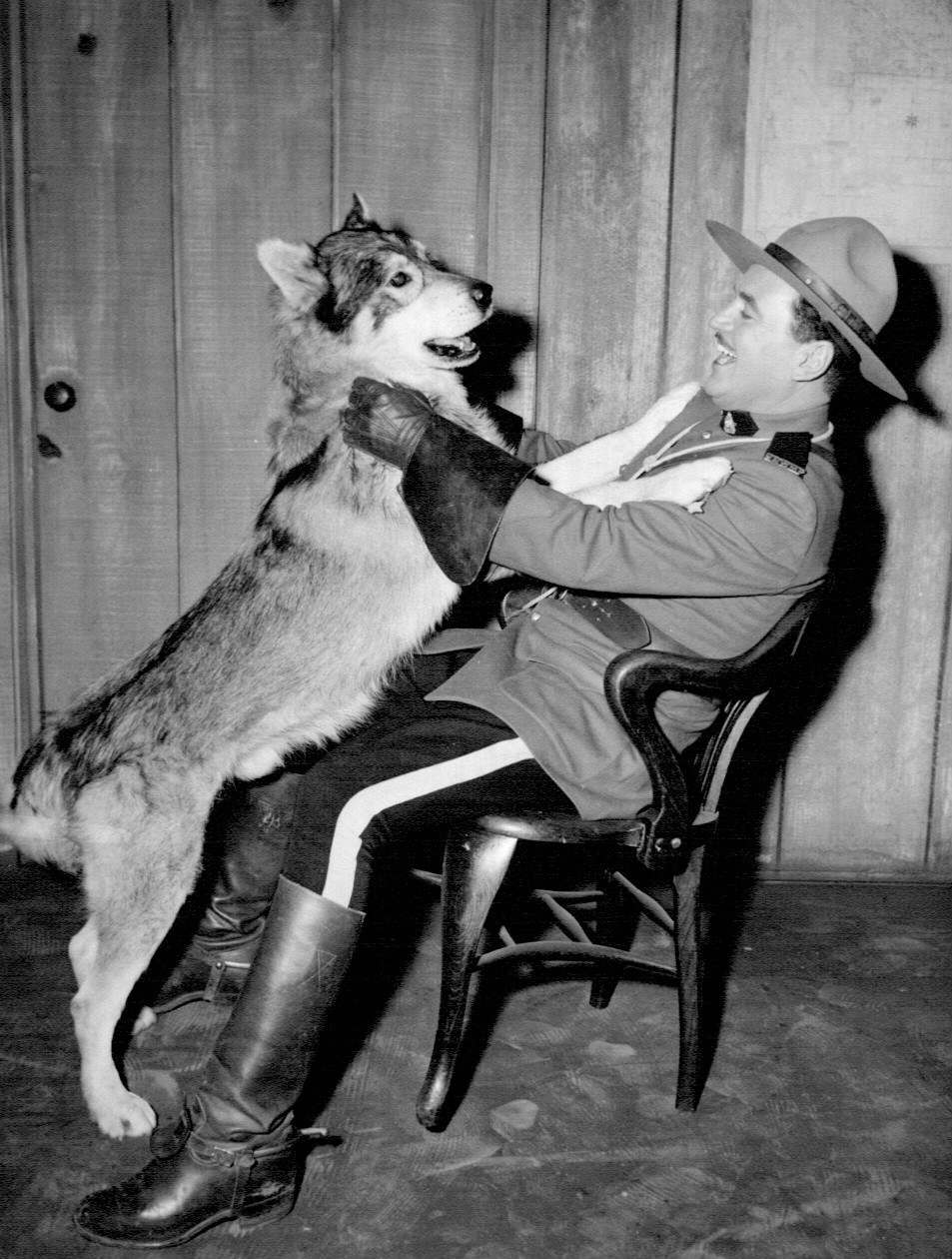
Richard Simmons and Yukon King in 1955, publicising Sergeant Preston of the Yukon

The first appearance of the NWMP in fiction occurred in 1885, in Joseph Collin's The Story of Louis Riel. The police soon became a popular subject for popular novels, with over 150 novels about the NWMP being published between 1890 and 1940 in North America and Britain, along with magazines and publications for children. Gilbert Parker and Ralph Connor's works particularly popular and influential, while James Curwood's illustrated works also... Connor's Corporal Connor: A Tale of Macleod Trail... Numerous poems were written about the NWMP, with probably best known being the Riders of the Plains, initially published in 1878 and expanded several times afterwards.

The novels used standard characters and plot. The mounted policeman was, as Michael Dawson describes, an Anglo-Saxon, "chivalric, self-abnegating hero whose motives were always beyond question". He would typically pursue and capture a suspect through a dangerous, hostile environment, often winning bloodlessly, facing a villain who often had a foreign or French-Canadian background. Andrew Graybill describes how the hero would exhibit "Victorian manliness", with the narrative focusing on "romance, manners and the preservation of justice through fair play. This narrative contrasted with the classic Western story in which a community is saved from violence by violence. Surrounding environment different: dangerous environment, vice pastoral. The works were all published in English: there were no French-Canadian novels published during the period which featured a mounted policeman as a hero.

There were differences, however, in how United States, British and Canadian authors portrayed the NWMP in their works. British novels about the NWMP, for example, focused on the role of the mounted police as colonial soldiers, with the stories emphasising the upper class backgrounds of the protagonists, and their moral duty in serving the British Empire on the fringes of civilisation. In contrast, United States authors translated their own frontier to Canada, telling stories in which familiar moral narratives took place using Canadian characters. Dick Harrison describes the mounted police in these novels as effectively "U.S. marshalls in red tunics", with the police "larger than the law" as they impose their own judgments. United States readers perceived the NWMP as part of their own frontier story, with the solitary mounted policeman both part of an organisation and yet still somewhat of a loner.

The Canadian tradition embraced much of the imperial British narrative, but also depicts the NWMP as a symbol of wider law, moral authority and right, that Harrison calls "an unseen ideal of order". The mounted police are more civilised in these stories than the settlers they are protecting: brave, disciplined and compassionate. These stories typically focused on the positive themes of hope and pride, rather than any negative elements, reinforcing reinforced the readers' sense of themselves as an heroic people. Michael Marsden describes this narrative as "the story of the winning of the West as it should have been won". Furthermore, particularly in the 1920s, the stories of the NWMP and the white, rural 19th-century prairies was a comforting image for readers. In the face of contemporary fears about threats to social hierarchies, fears of immigrants and other social problems, the myth of the NWMP depicted in these novels was a reassuring symbol. As Laurier commented about Corporal Connor, it would "preserve a special phase of our national history, and customs which are rapidly passing away".

US image wins out by the 1930s. Domestic Canadian popular fiction market collapses in the 1930s due to US competition.

== Radio and films ==
During the 1930s and 1940s, the NWMP became the topic of radio broadcasts and films. Radio series such as the Renfrew of the Mounted and Challenge of the Yukon continued the portrayal of the mounted police as iconic heroes, the latter series translating to television as Sergeant Preston of the Yukon in the 1950s. Over 250 films were made about the NWMP in the 20th century, including Rose Marie. The popularity of these finally waned in the 1970s, although this image of the NWMP has influenced late 20th century television portrayals of the modern RCMP, such as the Due South series depicted a mounted policeman from the Yukon. In more recent years, the iconic symbol of the canadian mounted policeman reappeared in the successful TV series When Calls the Heart, where Jack, a young canadian policeman, falls in love with Elizabeth, a young primary school teacher, in the little village of Coal Valley.

== Bibliography ==
- Dawson, Michael (1998). The Mountie From Dime Novel to Disney. Toronto, Canada: Between the Lines. ISBN 9781896357164.
- Graybill, Andrew R. (2007). Policing the Great Plains: Rangers, Mounties, and the North American Frontier, 1875-1910. Lincoln, U.S.: University of Nebraska Press. ISBN 9780803260023.
- Harrison, Dick (1974). "The Mounted Police in Fiction". In Dempsey, Hugh A. (ed.). Men in Scarlet. Lincoln, U.S.: Historical Society of Alberta and McClelland and Stewart West. pp. 163–174. OCLC 635848375.
- Harrison, Dick (2004). "Introduction: Selling a Birth-Rite for a Mass of Plottage". In Harrison, Dick (ed.). Best Mounted Police Stories (2nd ed.). Alberta, Canada: University of Alberta Press and Lone Pine Publishing. pp. 1–20. ISBN 0888640544.
- Hewitt, Steve R. (1998). "From RNWMP to RCMP: The Power of Myth and the Reality of Transformation". In Baker, William (ed.). The Mounted Police and Prairie Society, 1873-1919. Regina, Canada: Canadian Plains Research Centre, University of Regina. pp. vii–xvi. ISBN 0889771030.
- Kuhn, Edgar, ed. (2003). Tributes to the Scarlet Riders: An Anthology of Mountie Poems. Nanooose, Canada: Heritage House. ISBN 1894384709.
- Marsden, Michael T. (1993). "Popular Images of the Canadian Mounted Police and the Texas Rangers". Studies in Popular Culture. 16 (1): 1–14.
- Tranquilla, Ronald (1990). "Ranger and Mountie: Myths of National Identity in Zane Grey's The Lone Star Ranger and Ralph Connor's Corporal Cameron". Journal of Popular Culture. 24 (3): 69–80. doi:10.1111/j.0022-3840.1990.2403_69.x.
