= Kunghit Island =

Island in British Columbia, Canada

Kunghit
Gwaii Kunghit
- Interactive map of Kunghit

Geography
- Location: British Columbia Coast
- Coordinates: 52°6′N 131°5′W
- Archipelago: Haida Gwaii
- Area: 215 km^{2} (83 sq mi)
- Length: 24 km (14.9 mi)
- Width: 13 km (8.1 mi)

Administration
- Canada

Kunghit Island is an island in the Canadian province of British Columbia. It is the southernmost island in the Haida Gwaii archipelago, located to the south of Moresby Island. The southernmost point of Kunghit Island, called Cape St James, is used to delineate the boundary between Hecate Strait and Queen Charlotte Sound. The only habitation on Kunghit Island is Rose Harbour, on its north shore.

Kunghit Island is 24 kilometres (15 mi) long and ranges in width from 2 to 13 kilometres (1.2 to 8.1 mi). It is 215 square kilometres (83 sq mi) in area. Houston Stewart Channel separates Kunghit and Moresby Islands.

== See also ==
- List of islands of British Columbia
