= Rose Harbour, British Columbia =

Rose Harbour
- Rose Harbour
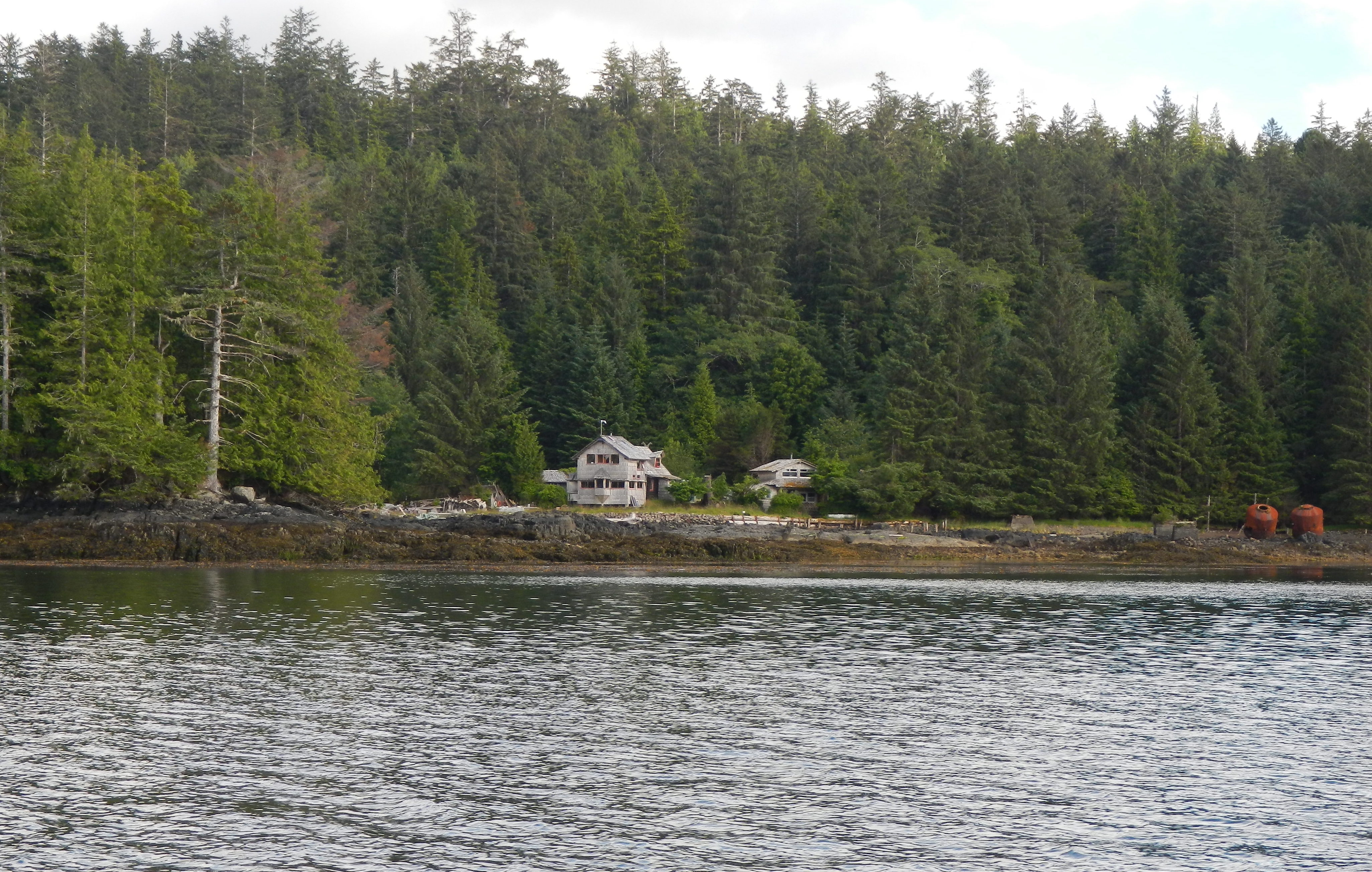
- Rose Harbour from the Houston Stewart Channel

- Location of Rose Harbour in British Columbia
- Coordinates: 52°09′00″N 131°04′30″W
- Country: Canada
- Province: British Columbia
- Region: North Coast
- Regional district: Skeena-Queen Charlotte
- Established: 1910
- Elevation: 0 m (0 ft)

Population (2011)
  - Total: 6
- Time zone: UTC−8 (PST)
  - Summer (DST): UTC−7 (PDT)
- Forward sortation area: V0T
- Area code: 250 / 778 / 236

Rose Harbour is an unincorporated settlement on the north coast of Kunghit Island, on the south shore of the Houston Stewart Channel, in Haida Gwaii. It is within the bounds of Gwaii Haanas National Park Reserve and Haida Heritage Site. It is the only privately owned property within Gwaii Haanas.

Rose Harbour was established as a whaling station in 1910 by the Queen Charlotte Whaling Company and operated until 1943. A monument survives to Chinese and Japanese people who died in the whaling trade.

Currently, there is a small group of houses at Rose Harbour, which offer lodging and dining services to kayakers and other tourists.

== Images ==
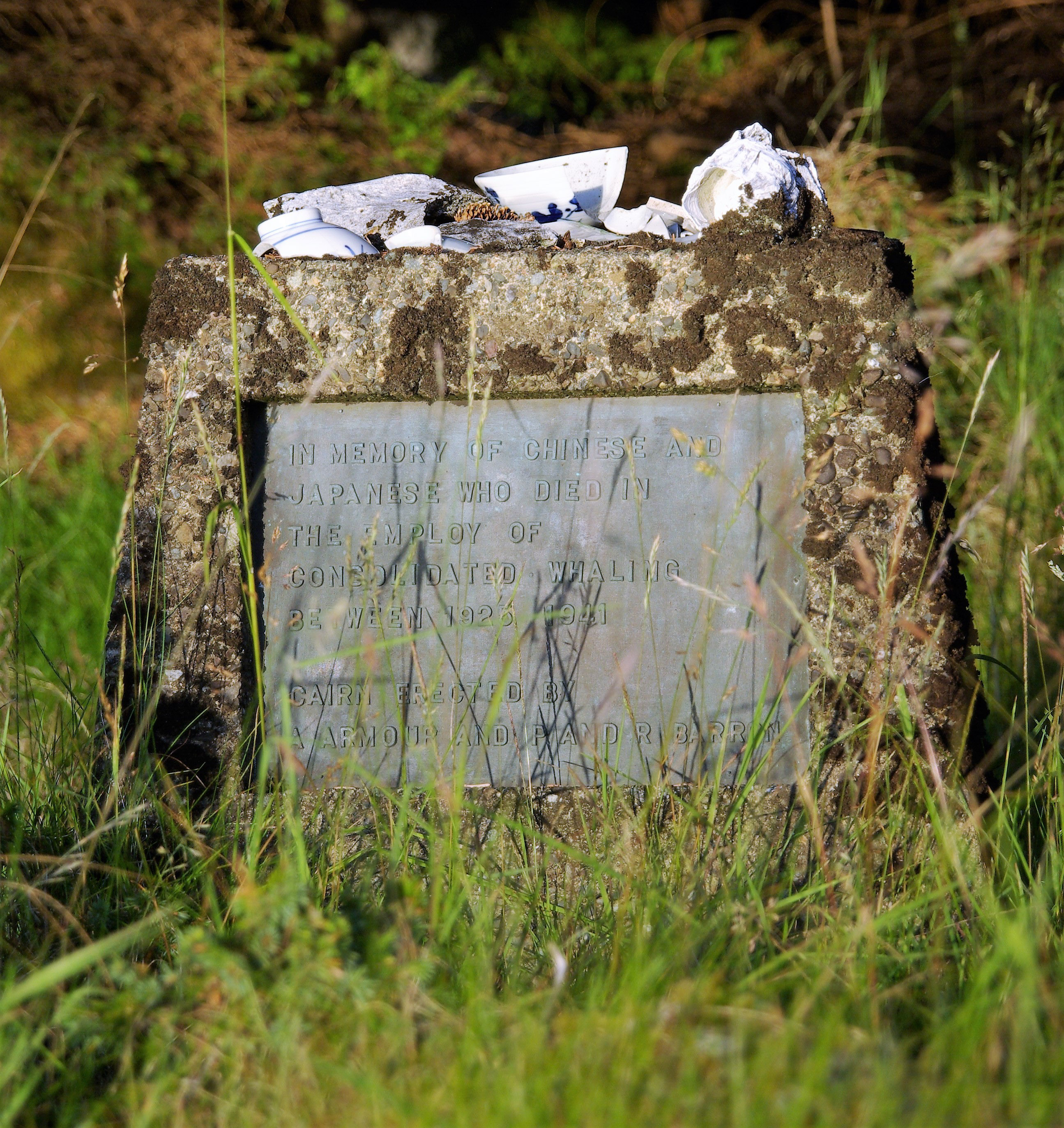
Memorial for whaling fatalities

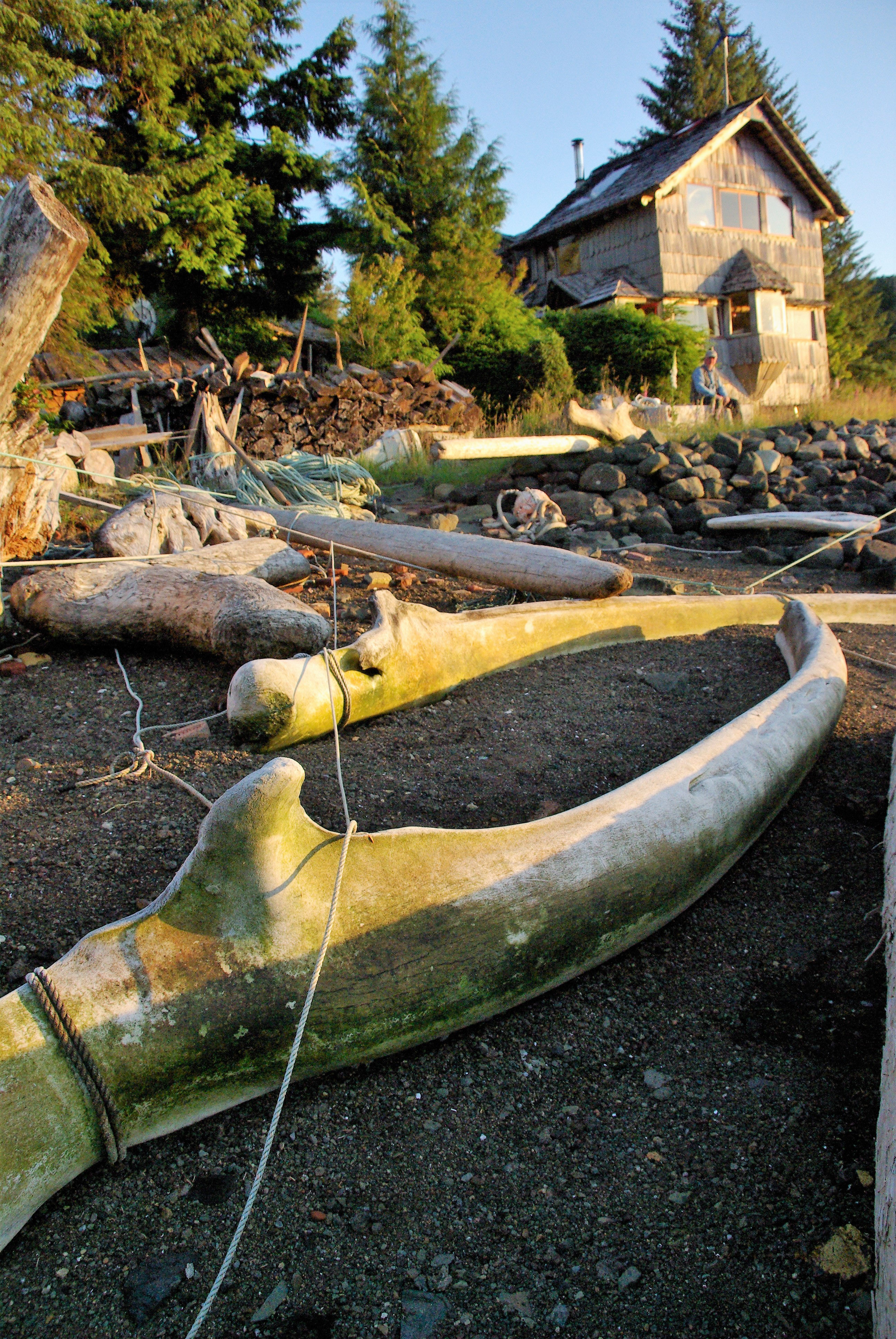
Whale bones on the beach

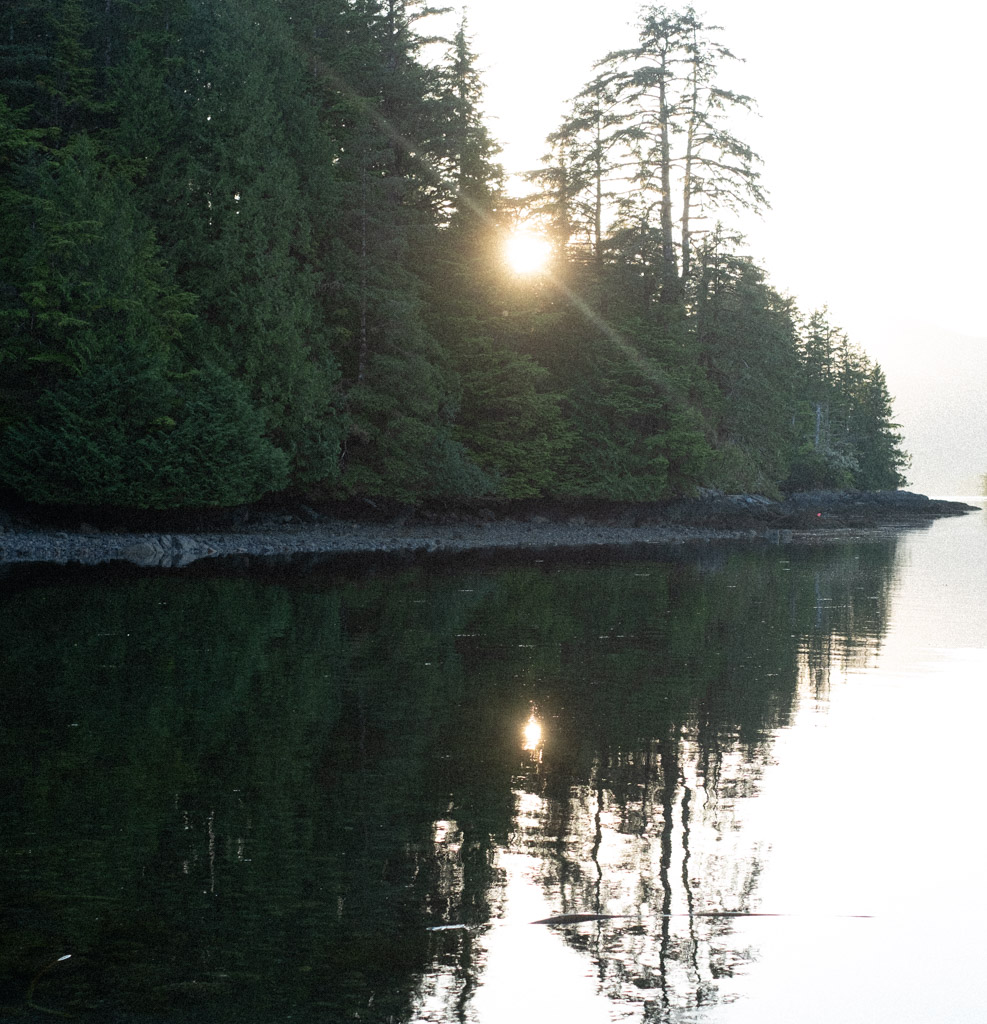
Sunset at Rose Harbour

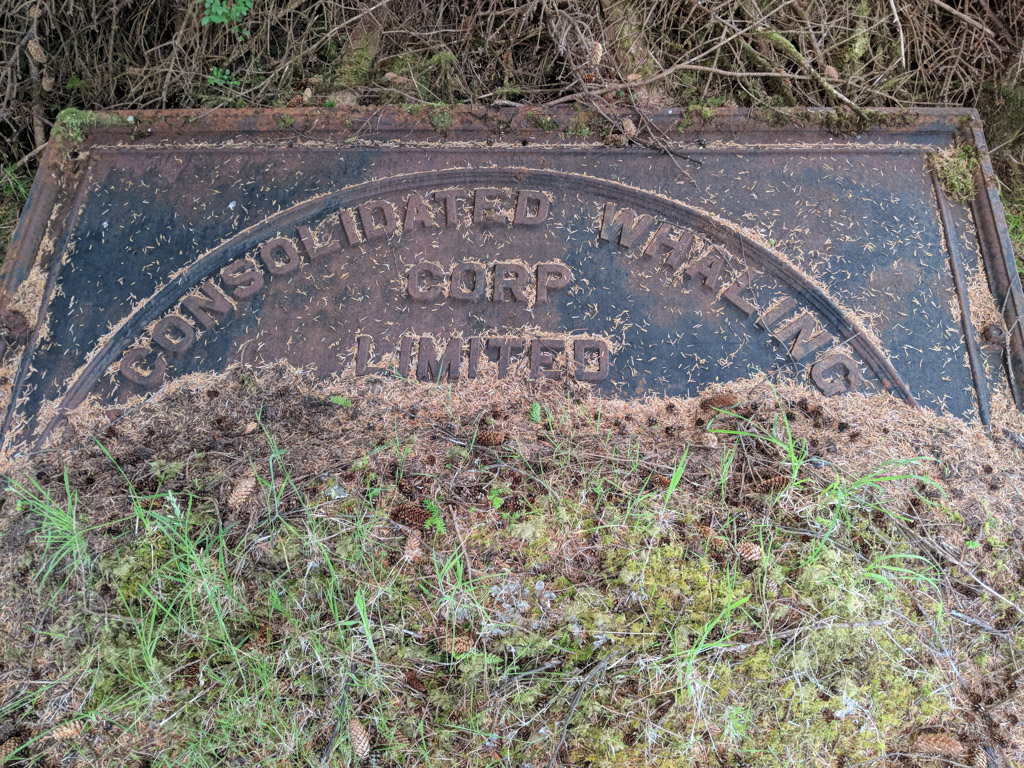
Consolidated Whaling Corporation plaque
