= Chesaw, Washington =

- Unincorporated community
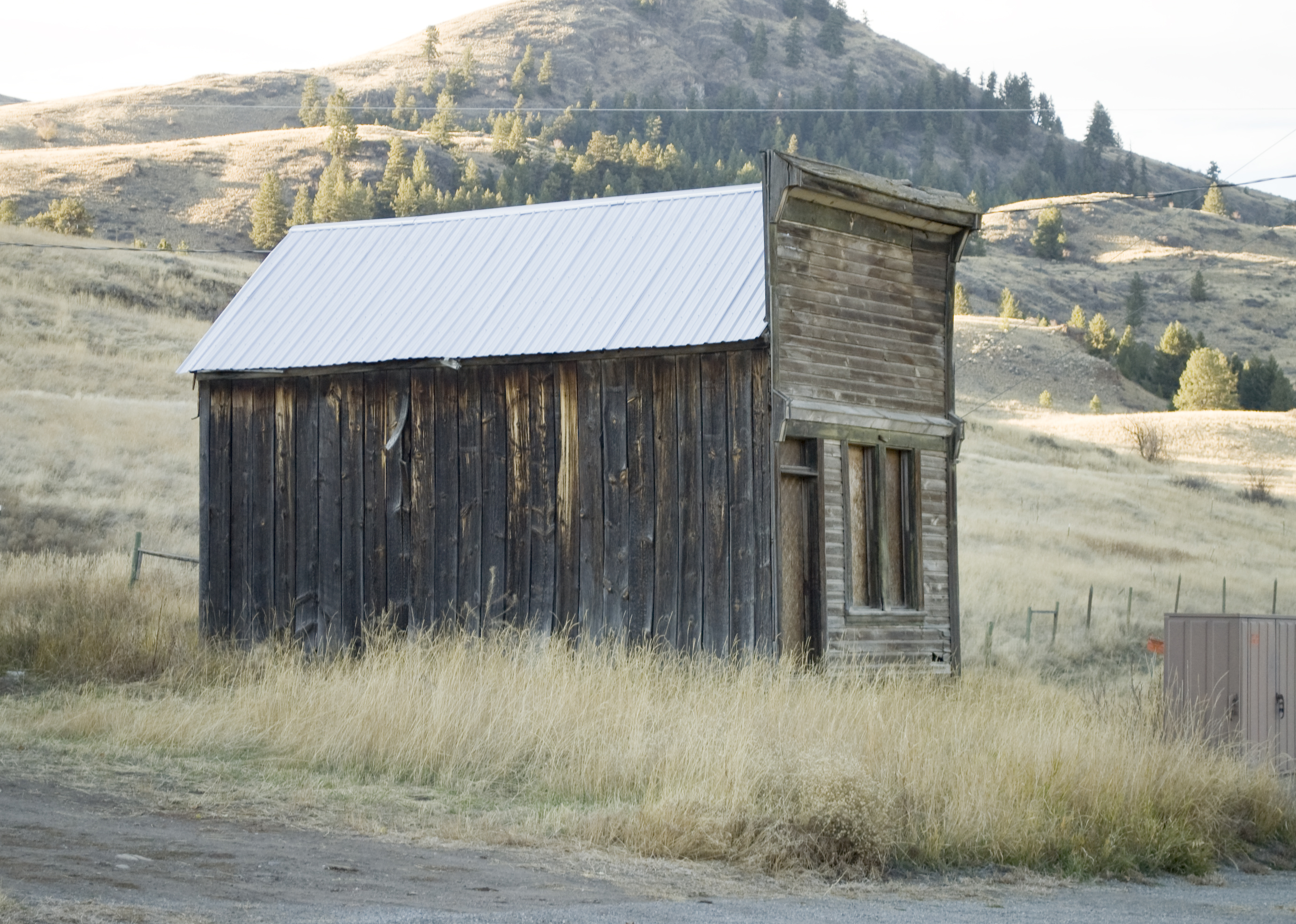
- A side view of a false front building in Chesaw

- Location within Washington (state) Location within the United States
- Coordinates: 48°56′46″N 119°03′05″W
- Country: United States
- State: Washington
- County: Okanogan
- Established: 1890s
- Elevation: 2,914 ft (888 m)
- Time zone: UTC-8 (Pacific (PST))
  - Summer (DST): UTC-7 (PDT)
- Area code(s): 360, 564
- GNIS feature ID: 1517666

Chesaw is an unincorporated community in Okanogan County, Washington. Chesaw was named for the Chinese settler Chee Saw, who arrived in the mid-1890s and married a Native American woman. The town sprang up and thrived during a brief gold rush from 1896 to 1900. Chesaw now hosts an annual rodeo held every 4th of July.

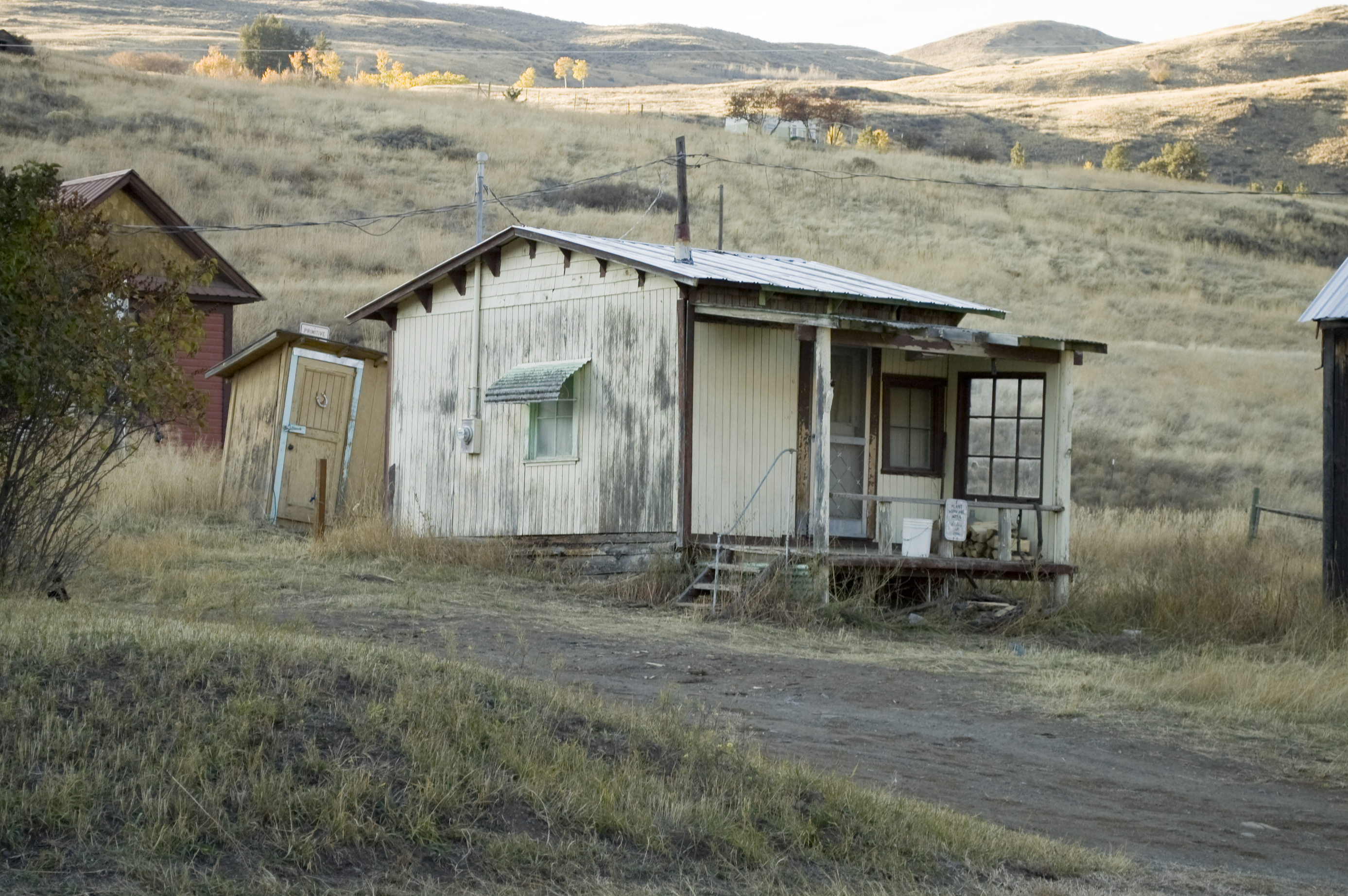
A cabin in Chesaw

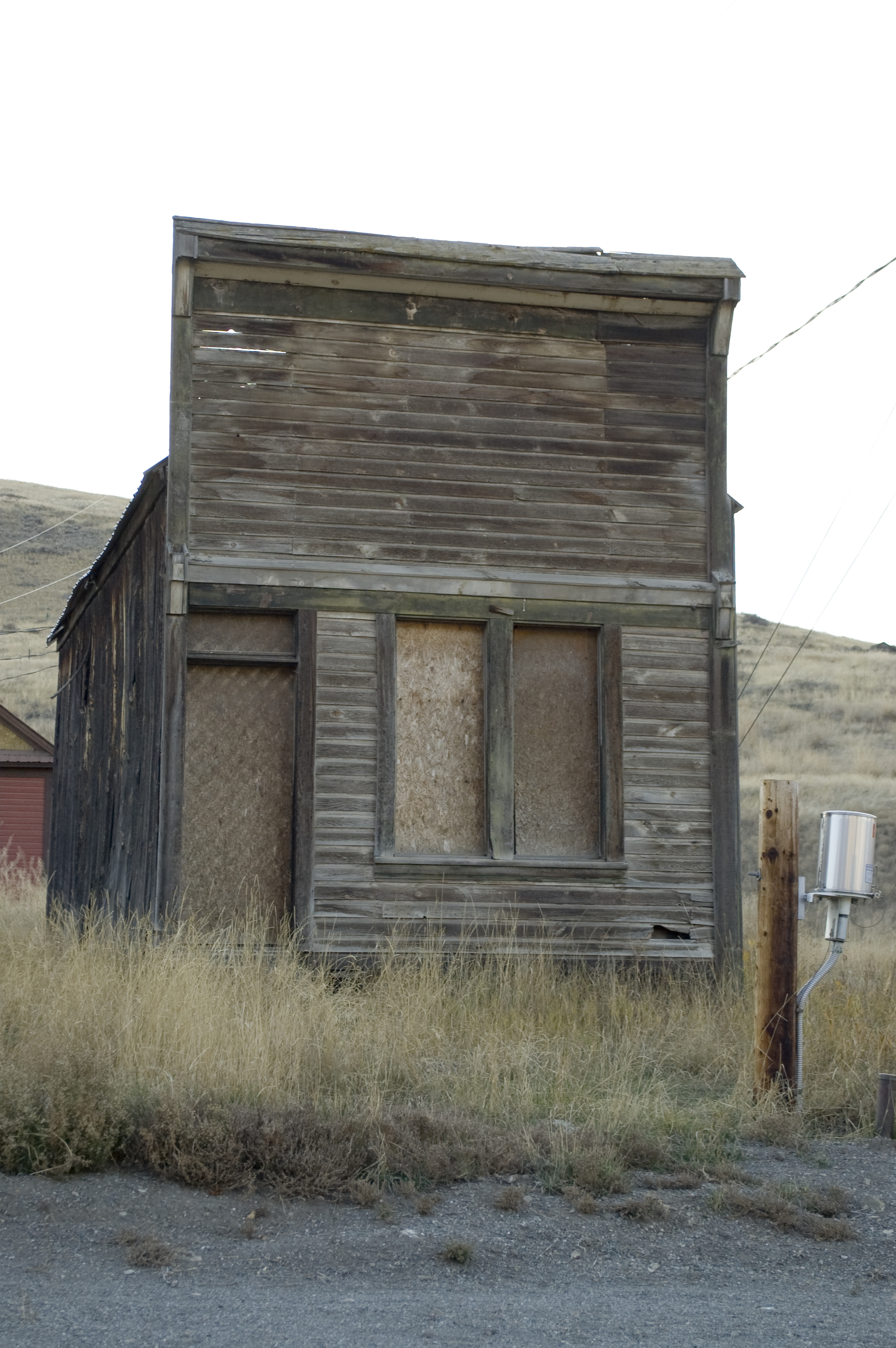
A false front building in Chesaw
