= Arthur D. Kean =

Canadian filmmaker, journalist, broadcaster, photographer, and horseman

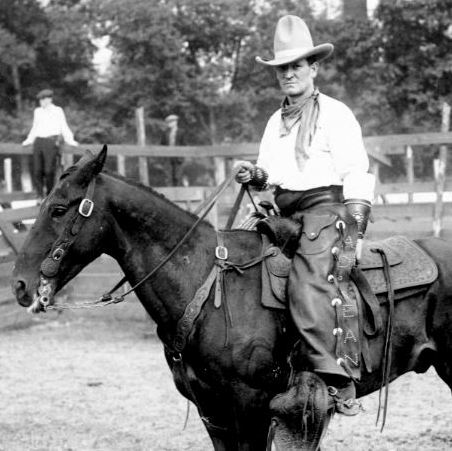
A. D. Kean as rodeo manager at "Range Days," Vancouver Exhibition, August 1923. His name is spelled out in the metal studs on his chaps. (City of Vancouver Archives item AM281-S8-: CVA 180-5074, detail)

Arthur David Kean (1882–1961)—widely known as A. D. Kean and "Cowboy" Kean—was a Canadian filmmaker, photographer, journalist, broadcaster, and horseman. He was the first British Columbia resident to make movies professionally, and the first to produce a feature-length film—the ill-fated (and long-lost) Policing the Plains (1927). In later years, he was well-known in eastern Canada for his western adventure stories, which were featured in print and on the radio.

== Early life (1882–1913) ==
Born in Emerson, Manitoba, A. D. Kean spent most of his first thirty years in the western United States and the interior of British Columbia. Following the diverse business interests of his father, Levi D. Kean (who dealt in real estate, mining properties, and horses), Arthur and his family moved from Manitoba to California, Oregon, Kansas, and finally Texas. The family relocated from Houston, Texas, to southeastern British Columbia in 1897.

In the East Kootenay region and Boundary Country of BC, and near Chesaw in Okanogan County, Washington, Arthur worked as a farmer, miner, cowboy, teamster, and butcher. An avid rodeo participant, he competed in the Calgary Stampede (1912) and the Winnipeg Stampede (1913)—as well as the "Real West" event at Minoru Park in Richmond, BC (1913), where he took first place in the wild horse race on opening day. After taking photographs as an amateur for a few years, he began selling his rodeo images as postcards. Early in 1913, he established a photographic business in Riverside, near Rock Creek, BC. His first magazine articles appeared in Rod and Gun in Canada later that year.

== Film career (1914–1927) ==
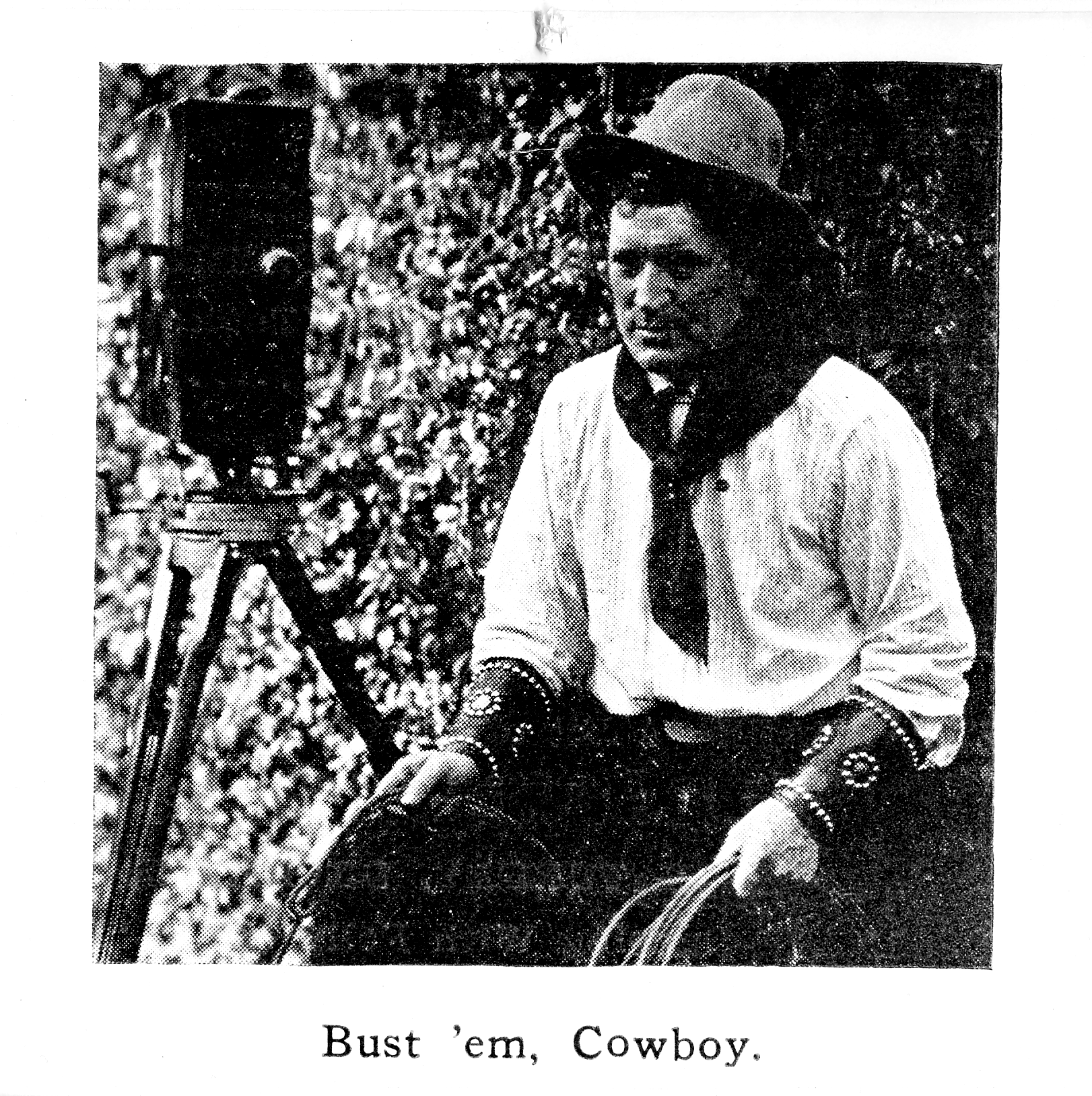
Kean, "The Cowboy Cameraman," with his first movie camera, in Moving Picture World, 23 Dec 1916

One of the first Canadians to make a living as a cinematographer, Kean went into the business in Vancouver in 1914. The first known theatrical screening of his films took place the week of 9 November 1914, when two reels of his rodeo and agricultural footage were shown at the city's Pantages Theatre. In 1916 he founded a film exchange, "Kean's Canada Films," to distribute his own work. He documented all sorts of local events and industries, but became best known for his films of British Columbia regiments departing for overseas during the Great War. (For further information about these First World War military films, see British Columbia for the Empire.)

Kean also organized, managed, and filmed a number of local rodeos or stampedes, including the "Range Days" cowboy sports events at the 1914, 1915, and 1923 Vancouver Exhibition. From 1920 to 1922–23, he was the main cinematographer for the British Columbia Patriotic and Educational Picture Service (PEPS), one of the first government film agencies in Canada. After the service collapsed amid political scandal, he would eventually launch a major effort at feature film production.

Policing the Plains—which Kean wrote, produced, directed, photographed, and edited—was an historical docudrama about the Royal Northwest Mounted Police. Filmed mainly in British Columbia and Alberta during the years 1924–27, the production was plagued by financial, logistical, and technical problems. It finally premiered (to mixed reviews) in Toronto in December 1927. However, Kean was unable to secure further distribution or exhibition for his feature. It was never screened publicly again, and was eventually lost or destroyed. Throughout his film career, he faced great difficulty in getting his work shown or distributed, largely due to Hollywood's domination of Canadian film distribution and exhibition chains. In 1928, Kean left the film industry and settled in the Toronto area.

Archivist and photographic historian David Mattison assessed Kean's filmmaking legacy in a 1986 article:

Kean was an extraordinary individual who single-handedly attempted to establish a new industry. Two reasons for his failure are familiar to filmmakers today: lack of provincial and federal incentives to filmmakers and their financial backers, and apathy on the part of Canadians for their own history and heroes. As Kean discovered, Made-In-The-USA is still a more powerful influence than Made-In-Canada.

== Toronto and vicinity (1928–1961) ==
In Toronto, Kean enjoyed a third career (1928–1940, and intermittently until 1958) as a writer, journalist, and radio personality. Most notably, he turned glimpses of Ontario life, and episodes from his western Canadian youth, into lively stories for the Toronto Daily Star (1928–34), the Star Weekly (1928–38), and his popular radio programs. The latter included several series of broadcast talks, such as Cowboy and Wildlife Adventures (CFCA Toronto, 1932), Rainbow Ranch (CFRB Toronto, 1936), and 2-K Ranch (CBL Toronto/CBC network, 1948). In 1938, he wrote, narrated, and performed in the 14-part radio drama series Sails and Saddles, which went from CBL Toronto to the CBC network. His activities and reporting were also featured in The Canadian Statesman newspaper of Bowmanville, Ontario (1934–40).

During the Second World War, Kean worked as a machinist or metallurgist at various tool-and-die plants in the Toronto area. After the war, he enjoyed local renown as a trainer and photographer of horses. He contributed text and photographs to an American sporting journal, The Chronicle of the Horse (1948–58), and launched a short-lived equestrian magazine called Hoof Prints (1949). Kean remained active as a photographer until his death on 11 January 1961 at the age of 78.

== Selected filmography ==
Kean's 1914–1927 film productions were shot on 35mm black & white nitrate film stock; most of them have not survived. The titles of several films listed below are linked to their archival descriptions or other information. For more about the films he made for the BC government, see the entry on the British Columbia Patriotic and Educational Picture Service.

- [Dominion Day, Lillooet] (1914 [or 1915]). Footage of Dominion Day races and rodeo events on the main street of Lillooet, BC. A two-minute segment is extant and viewable online.
- [Range Days at Vancouver Exhibition; Kelowna stampede; Armstrong Agricultural Fair; Duck Creek ranch; Okanagan apple, peach, and pear harvest.] (1914) Two-reel assembly of topical shorts shot in September 1914. Lost.
- The BC Animated Review (1914). Newsreel compilation showing Vancouver events. Lost.
- Wild Animal Life in British Columbia (1915-19). A compilation of wildlife footage, initially shot in early 1915. Later expanded with further footage shot in 1916-19, it was purchased by the BC Game Conservation Board in 1919. Lost.
- British Columbia for the Empire (1916). Feature-length compilation of documentary shorts showing BC military units departing for service in the First World War. Lost.
- The North British-Columbians, "Warden's Warriors," 102'nd Battalion C.E.F., Historic Departure (1916) The battalion is shown on parade at Comox, BC, and departing for Vancouver. Extant.
- Canadian Engineers at Work (1916). A recruiting film showing the training and activities of recruits in the Sixth Field Company, Canadian Engineers, at their base in North Vancouver. Lost.
- Whaling: British Columbia's Least Known and Most Romantic Industry (1916–19). Documentary filmed on the BC coast. Extant; viewable online via Library and Archives Canada's YouTube page.
- Told in the Hills (1917). Docudrama filmed at rodeos in Princeton and Penticton, BC. Lost.
- The Adventures of Count E. Z. Kisser (1917). Comedy short filmed in Vancouver. Lost.
- Profits from Oysters, AKA Oyster Cultivation in British Columbia (1920). PEPS short about the oyster industry, highlighting its employment of South Asian labourers; used as political propaganda in the 1920 BC provincial election. Lost.
- Fiftieth Anniversary of Fort Macleod, Alberta (1924). Twenty-minute film recording the anniversary celebrations, parade, and rodeo. Shot during local filming for Policing the Plains (below). Extant; viewable online.
- [Banff winter carnival] (1925). Shot in Banff, Alberta, during local filming for Policing the Plains. Lost.
- Policing the Plains (1927). Feature film about the history of the Royal Northwest Mounted Police, based on the book of the same name by Rev. R. G. MacBeth. Filmed in BC, Alberta, Saskatchewan and Ontario, April 1924–September 1927. Lost.
- Fox Hunting in Canada (1949). A 16 mm short showing the activities of the Toronto-North York Hunt. Extant.
