= List of Universal Pictures films (1930–1939) =

This is a list of films produced or distributed by Universal Pictures in 1930–1939, founded in 1912 as the Universal Film Manufacturing Company. It is the main motion picture production and distribution arm of Universal Studios, a subsidiary of the NBCUniversal division of Comcast.

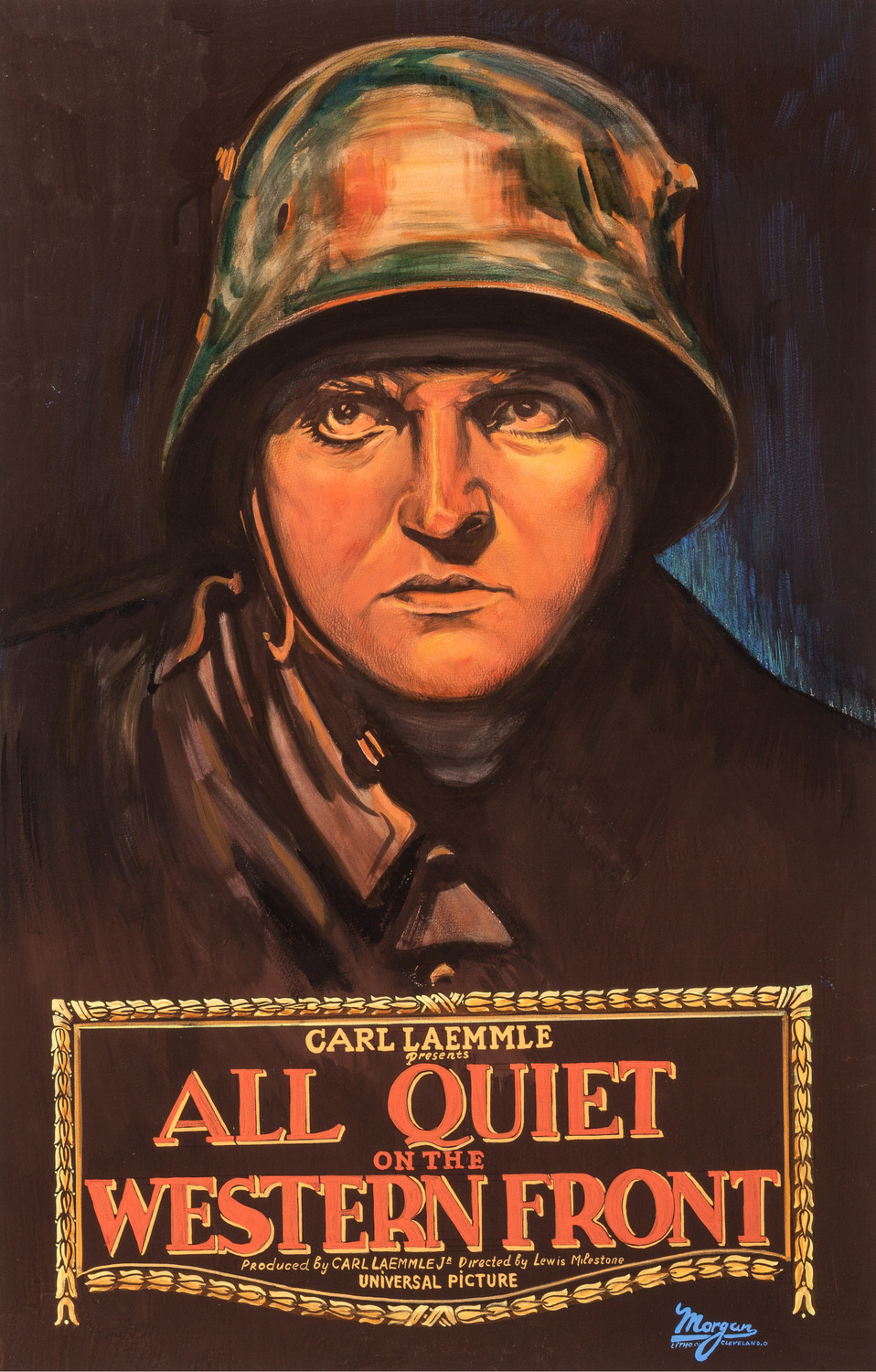
Poster for All Quiet on the Western Front (1930)

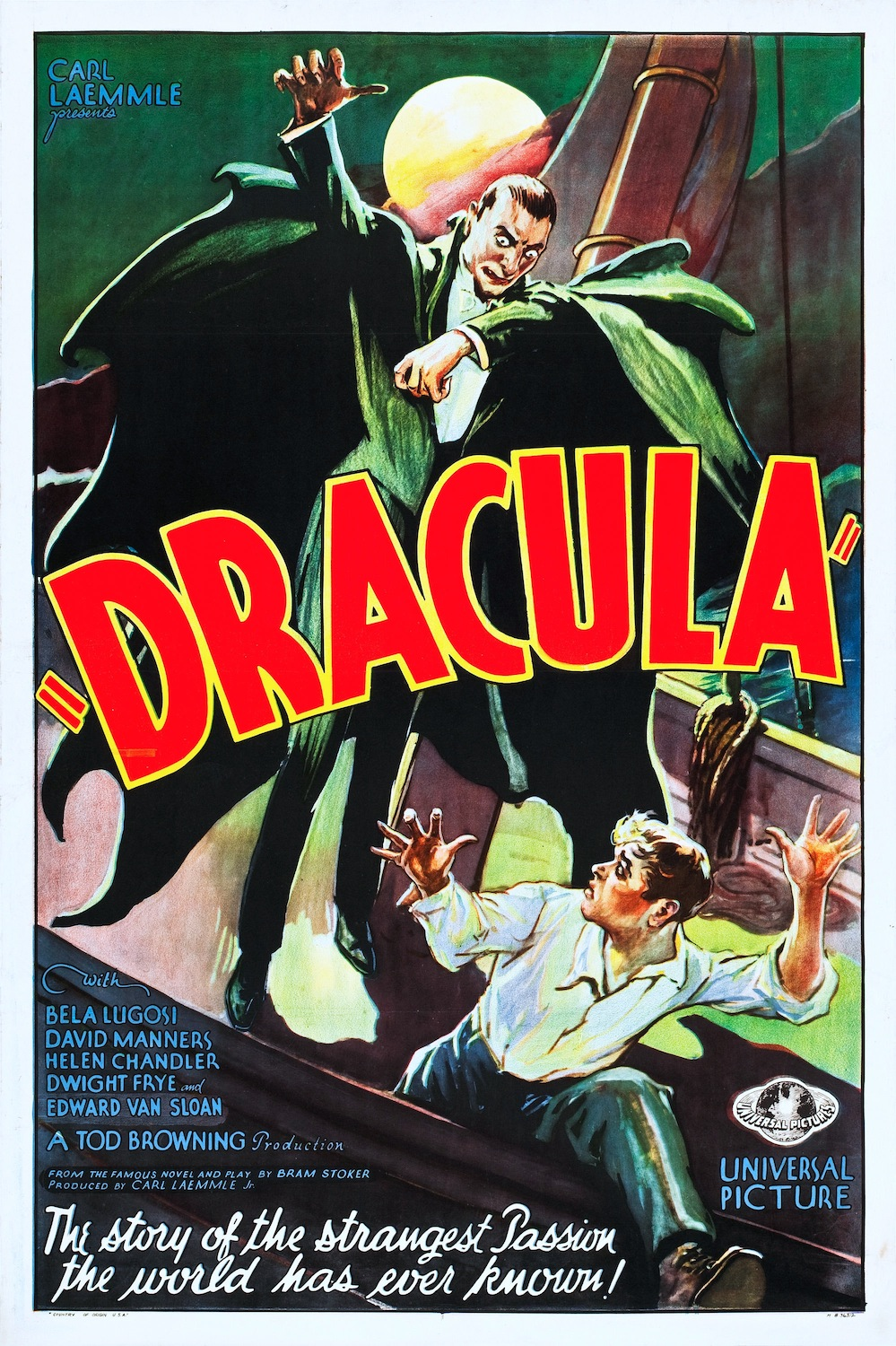
Poster for Dracula (1931)

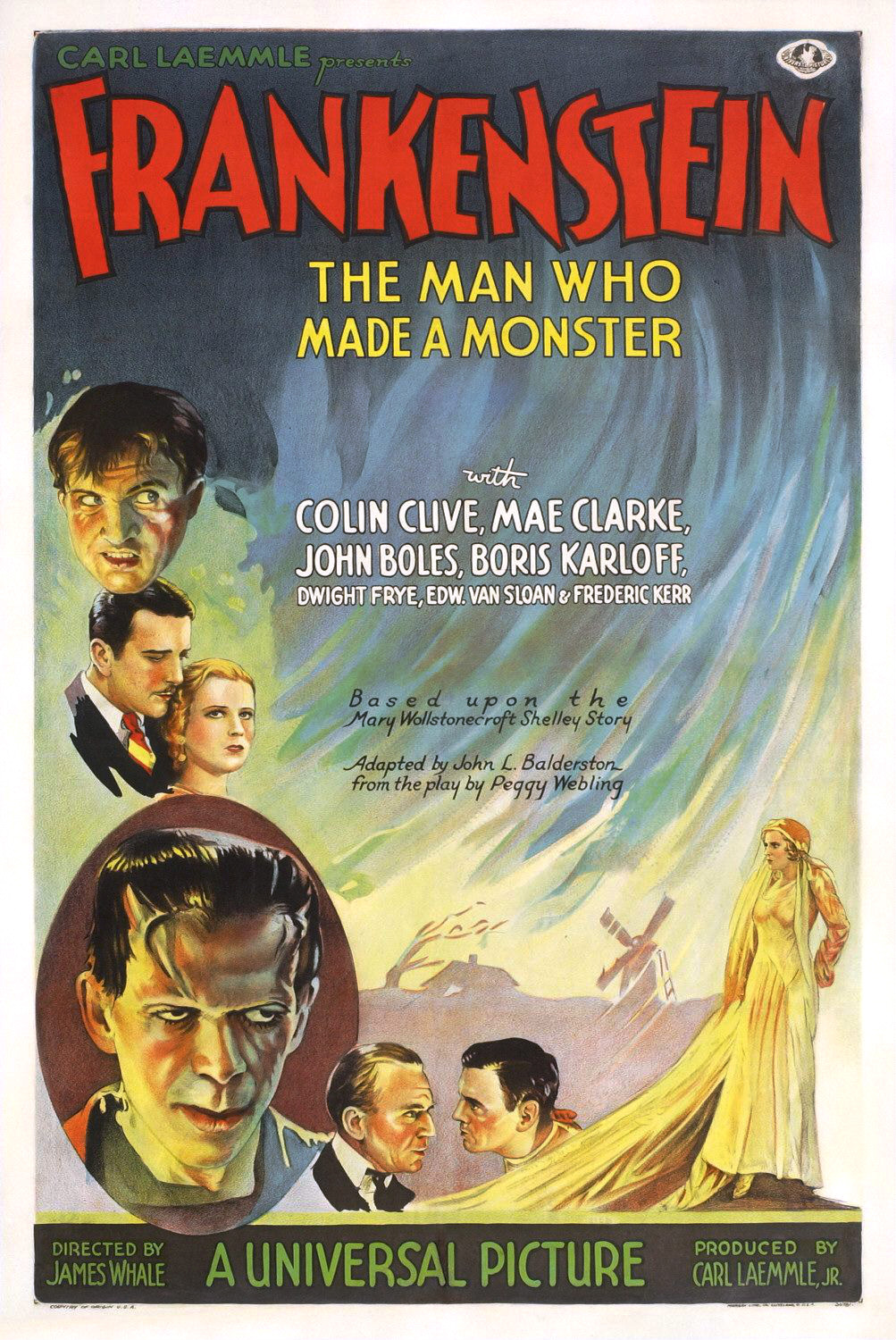
Poster for Frankenstein (1931)

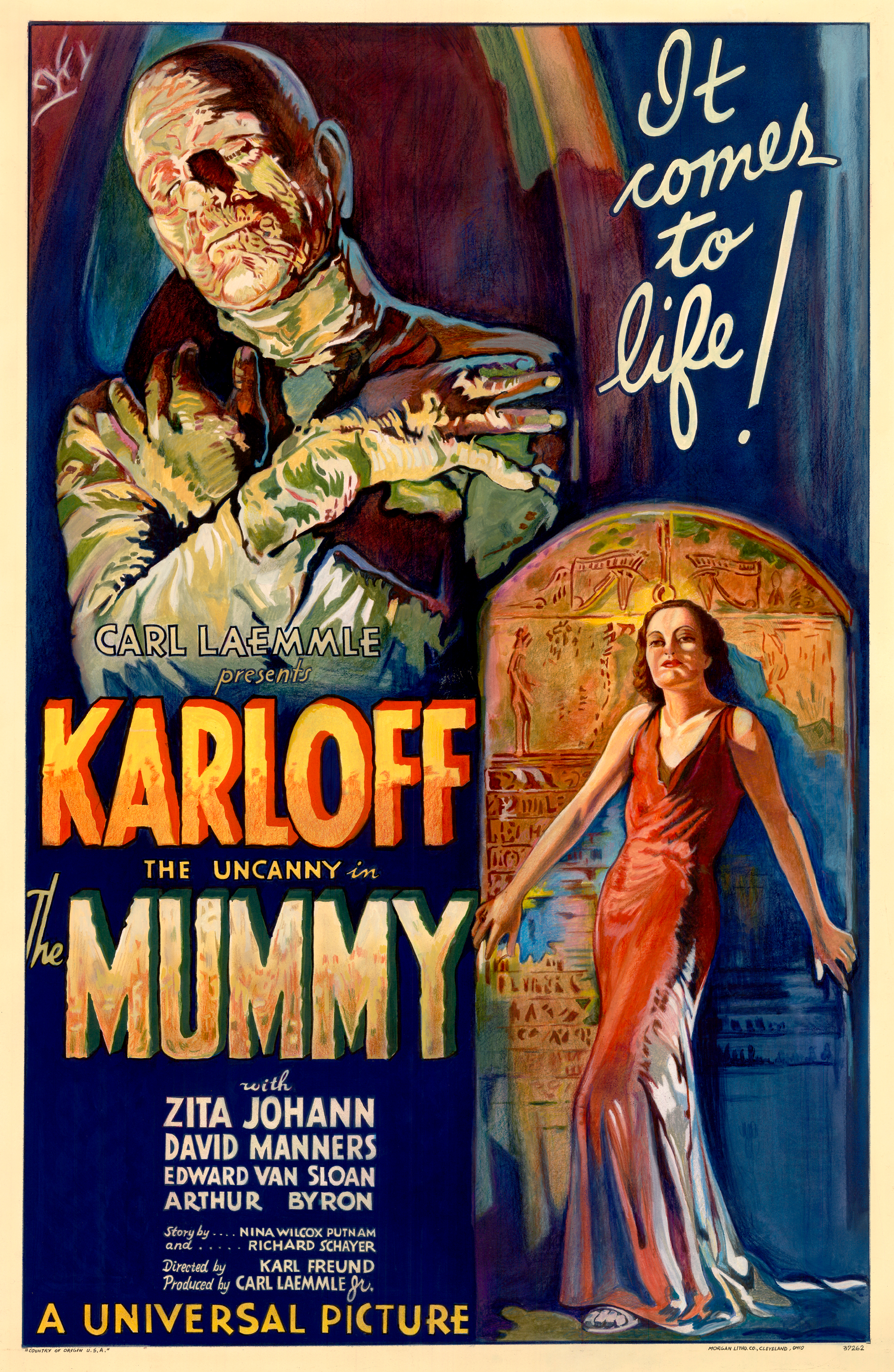
Poster for The Mummy (1932)

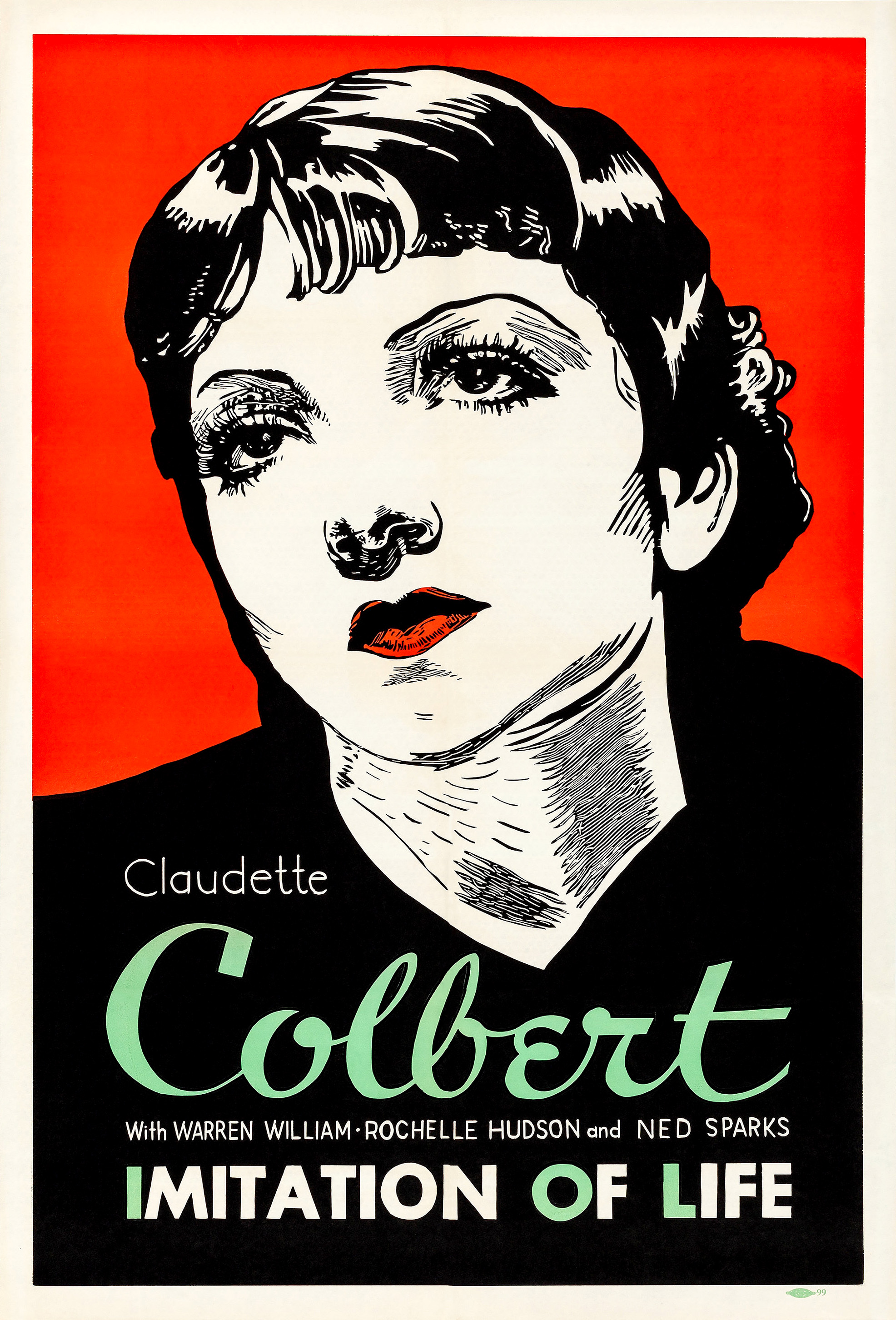
Poster for Imitation of Life (1934)

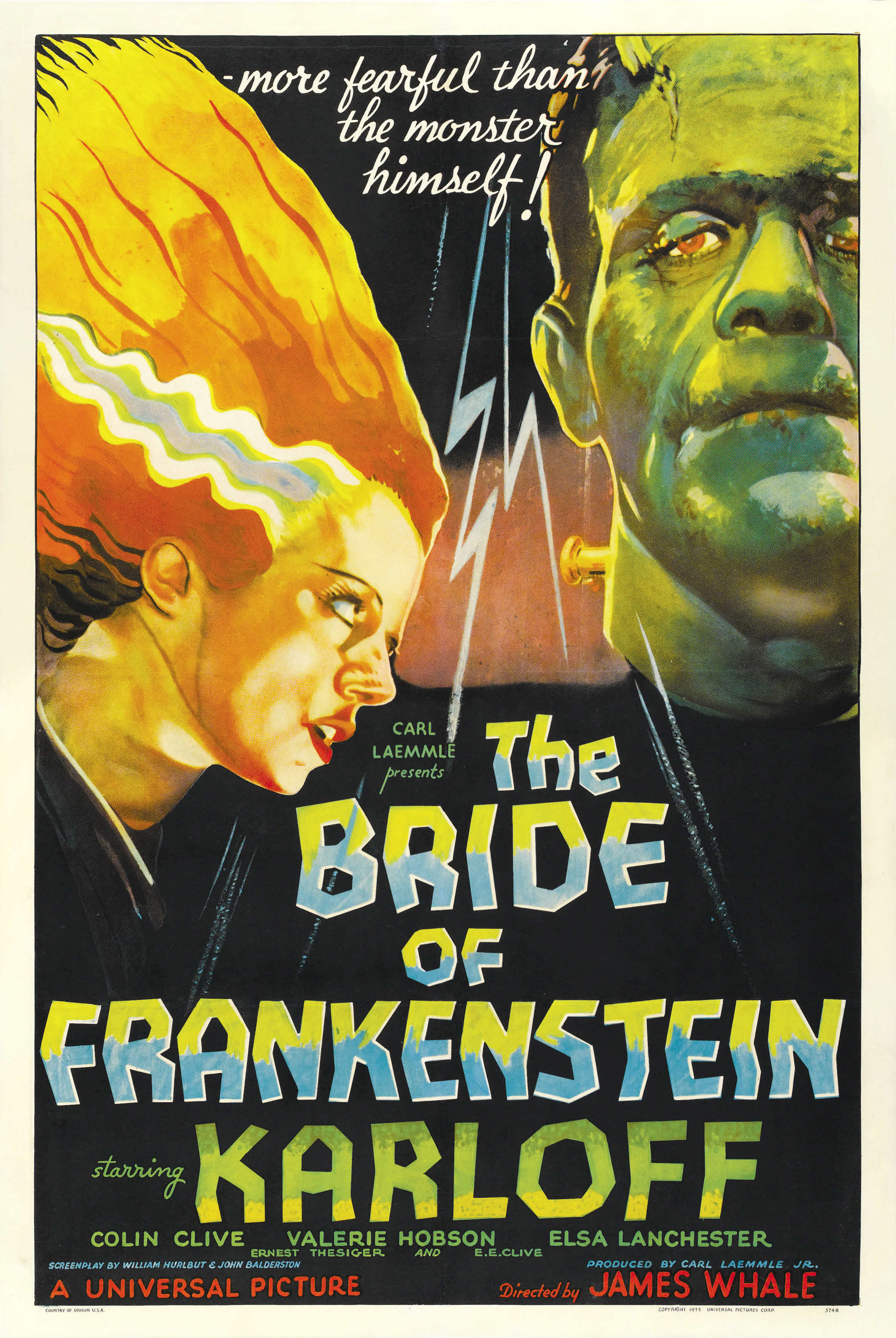
Poster for Bride of Frankenstein (1935)

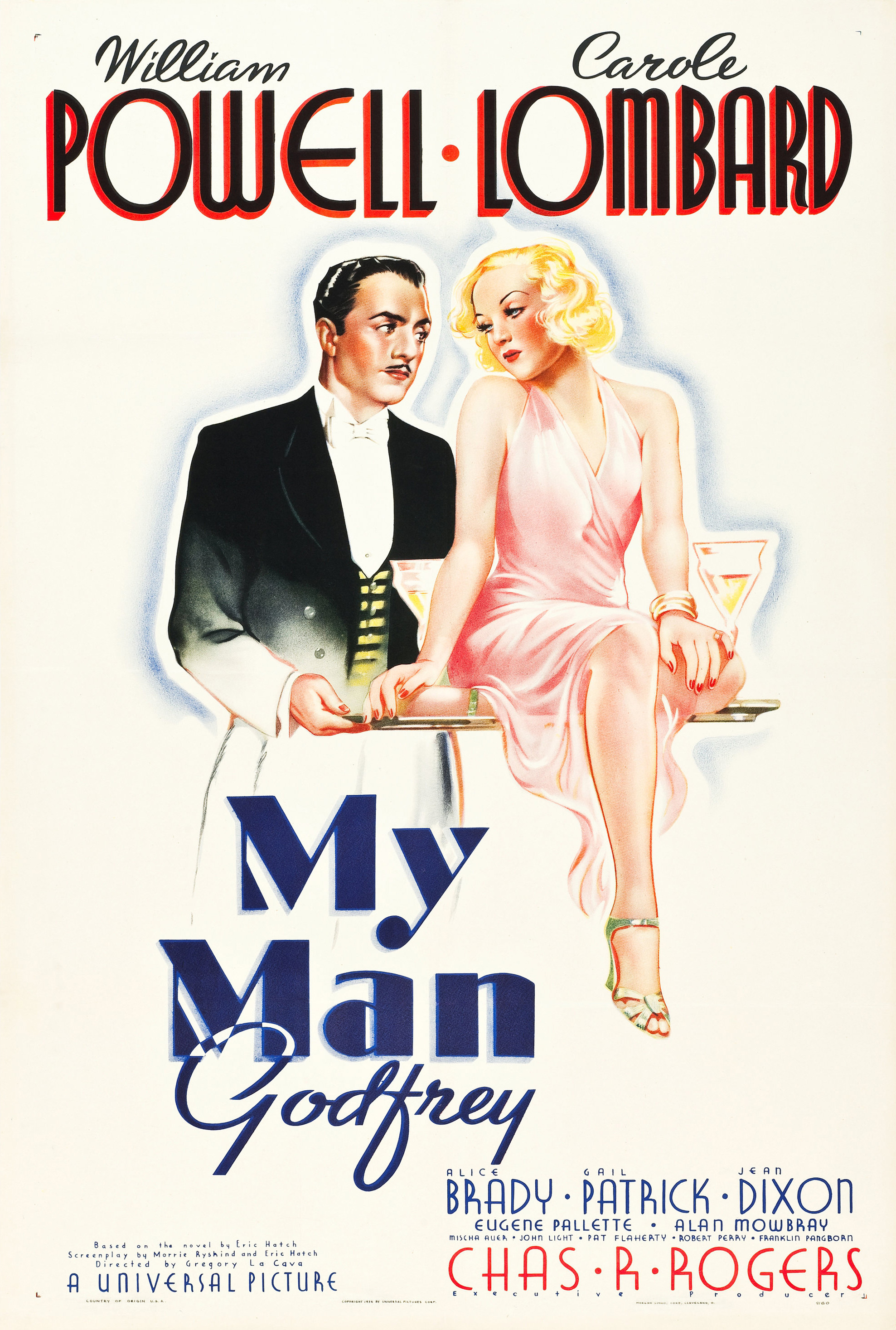
Poster for My Man Godfrey (1936)

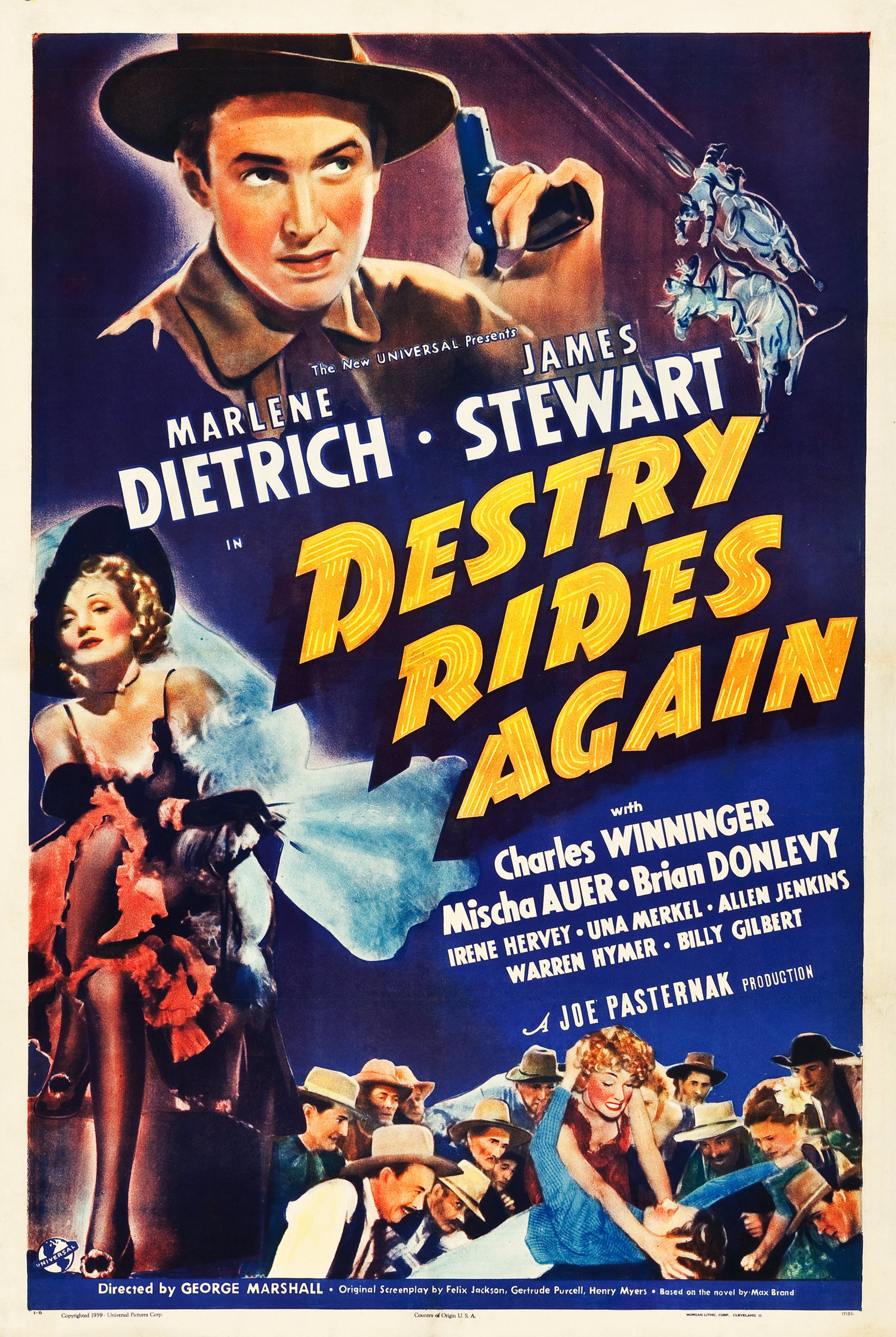
Poster for Destry Rides Again (1939)

== 1930 ==
Release date	Title	Notes	Video if in the public domain
January 12, 1930	Night Ride		
January 19, 1930	Parade of the West	Part-Talkie	
January 26, 1930	The Climax		
February 8, 1930	The Mounted Stranger		
February 9, 1930	Dames Ahoy!		
February 25, 1930	The Jade Box	Part-Talkie Serial	
March 1930	Undertow		
March 1, 1930	The Cohens and the Kellys in Scotland		
March 2, 1930	Lucky Larkin	Synchronized Score	
March 23, 1930	Trailing Trouble		
March 29, 1930	Captain of the Guard		
April 1930	Hide-Out		
April 6, 1930	The Fighting Legion	Part-Talkie	
April 19, 1930	King of Jazz	All Technicolor; Universal's First All Color Feature	
April 27, 1930	Roaring Ranch		
May 4, 1930	Mountain Justice		
May 25, 1930	The Czar of Broadway		
June 1930	Embarrassing Moments		
June 2, 1930	The Lightning Express	Part-Talkie Serial	
June 8, 1930	Trigger Tricks		
June 8, 1930	Young Desire		
June 29, 1930	Song of the Caballero		
July 13, 1930	What Men Want		
July 17, 1930	Terry of the Times	Part-Talkie Serial	
August 3, 1930	The Little Accident		
August 3, 1930	Sons of the Saddle		
August 22, 1930	The Storm		
August 24, 1930	All Quiet on the Western Front	Winner, Academy Award For Best Picture	
August 24, 1930	Spurs		
September 18, 1930	Outside the Law		
October 6, 1930	A Lady Surrenders		
October 10, 1930	The Indians Are Coming	Universal's First All-Talking Serial	
October 23, 1930	East Is West		
October 26, 1930	The Concentratin' Kid		
November 10, 1930	The Cat Creeps	Lost Film	
November 23, 1930	See America Thirst		
December 1930	Free Love		
December 5, 1930	The Boudoir Diplomat		
December 21, 1930	The Cohens and Kellys in Africa		

== 1931 ==
Release date	Title	Notes
February 2, 1931	Resurrection	
February 14, 1931	Dracula	
March 3, 1931	Finger Prints	Serial
March 23, 1931	Heroes of the Flames	Serial
March 29, 1931	Bad Sister	
April 12, 1931	The Virtuous Husband	
April 30, 1931	Iron Man	
May 11, 1931	The She-Wolf	(a.k.a. Mother's Millions)
May 14, 1931	Seed	
May 27, 1931	Up for Murder	
July 15, 1931	Ex-Bad Boy	
August 1931	Many a Slip	
August 1, 1931	The Homicide Squad	
August 1, 1931	East of Borneo	
August 24, 1931	Danger Island	
September 4, 1931	Waterloo Bridge (Note: Owned by Warner Bros. (via Turner Entertainment Co.))	distribution only
September 21, 1931	Graft	
October 13, 1931	The Spirit of Notre Dame	
October 20, 1931	Reckless Living	
October 23, 1931	The Spell of the Circus	
November 21, 1931	Frankenstein	
November 23, 1931	Battling with Buffalo Bill	
November 28, 1931	Nice Women	
December 1, 1931	Lasca of the Rio Grande	
December 1, 1931	Heaven on Earth	
December 4, 1931	A House Divided	
December 26, 1931	Strictly Dishonorable	distribution only
December 28, 1931	The Last Ride	

== 1932 ==
Release date	Title	Notes
January 3, 1932	The Unexpected Father	
January 4, 1932	Detective Lloyd	
February 21, 1932	Murders in the Rue Morgue	
February 28, 1932	Law and Order	
March 1, 1932	The Impatient Maiden	
March 1, 1932	Stowaway	
March 14, 1932	Steady Company	
March 28, 1932	The Cohens and Kellys in Hollywood	
March 28, 1932	The Airmail Mystery	
April 1, 1932	Scandal for Sale	
April 1, 1932	Racing Youth	
April 17, 1932	Destry Rides Again	
April 24, 1932	The Rider of Death Valley	
May 5, 1932	Night World	
June 2, 1932	Radio Patrol	
June 16, 1932	Doomed Battalion	
June 20, 1932	Heroes of the West	
June 23, 1932	Fast Companions	
June 30, 1932	The Texas Bad Man	
July 1, 1932	Tom Brown of Culver	
August 4, 1932	My Pal, the King	
September 8, 1932	Okay, America!	
September 12, 1932	Jungle Mystery	
September 25, 1932	The Fourth Horseman	
October 1, 1932	The All American	
October 2, 1932	Once in a Lifetime	
October 20, 1932	The Old Dark House (Note: Owned by Cohen Media Group; sales rights represented by HanWay Films)	distribution only
November 3, 1932	Hidden Gold	
November 3, 1932	Air Mail	
December 1, 1932	Afraid to Talk	
December 5, 1932	The Lost Special	Film serial
December 22, 1932	The Mummy	
December 22, 1932	Flaming Guns	
December 30, 1932	Back Street	

== 1933 ==
Release date	Title	Notes
January 5, 1933	They Just Had to Get Married	
January 12, 1933	Laughter in Hell	
February 1, 1933	Nagana	
February 2, 1933	Terror Trail	
February 23, 1933	Clancy of the Mounted	
March 16, 1933	Rustlers' Roundup	
March 25, 1933	Private Jones	
April 1, 1933	Destination Unknown	
April 8, 1933	Out All Night	
April 15, 1933	The Cohens and Kellys in Trouble	
April 20, 1933	Lucky Dog	
May 1, 1933	The Big Cage	
May 4, 1933	The Kiss Before the Mirror	
May 22, 1933	The Phantom of the Air	Film serial
June 1, 1933	King of the Arena	
June 1, 1933	Horse Play	
June 1, 1933	Don't Bet on Love	
July 20, 1933	The Fiddlin' Buckaroo	
July 20, 1933	Secret of the Blue Room	
August 1, 1933	Moonlight and Pretzels	
August 3, 1933	Her First Mate	
August 14, 1933	Gordon of Ghost City	
September 4, 1933	The Trail Drive	
September 22, 1933	S.O.S. Eisberg	
September 25, 1933	Ladies Must Love	
October 1, 1933	Saturday's Millions	
October 1, 1933	Love, Honor, and Oh Baby!	
October 20, 1933	The Perils of Pauline	Serial
October 26, 1933	Strawberry Roan	
November 1, 1933	Only Yesterday	
November 13, 1933	The Invisible Man	
November 25, 1933	Myrt and Marge	
December 9, 1933	King for a Night	
December 11, 1933	Counsellor at Law	
December 11, 1933	Gun Justice	
December 18, 1933	By Candlelight	

== 1934 ==
Release date	Title	Notes
January 6, 1934	Bombay Mail	
January 15, 1934	Cross Country Cruise	
January 22, 1934	Beloved	
January 29, 1934	Pirate Treasure	
February 10, 1934	Madame Spy	
February 26, 1934	The Poor Rich	
March 1, 1934	Wheels of Destiny	
March 5, 1934	The Crosby Case	
March 7, 1934	Midnight	
March 19, 1934	The Countess of Monte Cristo	
March 30, 1934	Death Takes a Holiday	
April 3, 1934	Uncertain Lady	
April 4, 1934	I Like It That Way	
April 6, 1934	Honor of the Range	
April 9, 1934	Glamour	
April 21, 1934	I'll Tell the World	
April 23, 1934	The Vanishing Shadow	
May 1, 1934	Let's Be Ritzy	
May 1, 1934	Affairs of a Gentleman	
May 4, 1934	Love Birds	
May 18, 1934	The Black Cat	
June 1, 1934	Half a Sinner	
June 1, 1934	Let's Talk It Over	
June 4, 1934	Little Man, What Now?	
June 7, 1934	The Love Captive	
June 11, 1934	Smoking Guns	
July 16, 1934	The Red Rider	
July 17, 1934	I Give My Love	
August 6, 1934	One More River	
August 13, 1934	Romance in the Rain	
September 1, 1934	The Human Side	
September 1, 1934	One Exciting Adventure	
September 1, 1934	Million Dollar Ransom	
September 1, 1934	Gift of Gab	
September 1, 1934	Embarrassing Moments	
September 24, 1934	Rocky Rhodes	
October 1, 1934	Wake Up and Dream	
October 22, 1934	Great Expectations	
October 29, 1934	Tailspin Tommy	
November 1, 1934	There's Always Tomorrow	
November 5, 1934	Cheating Cheaters	
November 24, 1934	When a Man Sees Red	
November 26, 1934	Imitation of Life	Nominee, Academy Award for Best Picture
December 3, 1934	Secret of the Chateau	
December 10, 1934	Strange Wives	
December 20, 1934	Peter	
December 24, 1934	The Man Who Reclaimed His Head	

== 1935 ==
Release date	Title	Notes
January 2, 1935	Life Returns	
January 21, 1935	A Notorious Gentleman	
January 21, 1935	Rustlers of Red Dog	
February 4, 1935	The Mystery of Edwin Drood	
February 11, 1935	Rendezvous at Midnight	
February 18, 1935	The Good Fairy	
March 1, 1935	Night Life of the Gods	
March 4, 1935	Transient Lady	
March 5, 1935	I've Been Around	
March 11, 1935	The Crimson Trail	
March 18, 1935	It Happened in New York	
March 22, 1935	Straight from the Heart	
April 1, 1935	Storm Over the Andes	
April 1, 1935	Princess O'Hara	
April 15, 1935	Stone of Silver Creek	
April 15, 1935	The Call of the Savage	
April 22, 1935	Bride of Frankenstein	
April 22, 1935	Mister Dynamite	
May 1, 1935	Alias Mary Dow	
May 13, 1935	Werewolf of London	
May 31, 1935	Chinatown Squad	
June 1, 1935	Border Brigands	
July 1, 1935	Manhattan Moon	
July 2, 1935	Lady Tubbs	
July 8, 1935	The Raven	
July 8, 1935	The Roaring West	
July 29, 1935	Outlawed Guns	
August 5, 1935	She Gets Her Man	
September 1, 1935	The Affair of Susan	
September 2, 1935	Diamond Jim	
October 1, 1935	The Throwback	
October 1, 1935	King Solomon of Broadway	
October 1, 1935	His Night Out	
October 21, 1935	Three Kids and a Queen	
October 21, 1935	Tailspin Tommy in the Great Air Mystery	
October 22, 1935	Stormy	
October 28, 1935	Remember Last Night?	
November 1, 1935	Fighting Youth	
November 11, 1935	The Ivory-Handled Gun	
December 1, 1935	East of Java	
December 1, 1935	Sweet Surrender	
December 9, 1935	The Great Impersonation	
December 30, 1935	Magnificent Obsession	

== 1936 ==
Release date	Title	Notes
January 13, 1936	The Adventures of Frank Merriwell	Serial
January 20, 1936	The Invisible Ray	
January 22, 1936	Sunset of Power	
January 29, 1936	Silver Spurs	
January 30, 1936	Next Time We Love	
February 10, 1936	Dangerous Waters	
February 12, 1936	Don't Get Personal	
March 1, 1936	Sutter's Gold	
March 9, 1936	Love Before Breakfast	
April 6, 1936	Flash Gordon	
May 11, 1936	Dracula's Daughter	
May 17, 1936	Show Boat	distribution only; last Universal Pictures Corp. film
June 1, 1936	For the Service	first Universal Productions Inc. film
June 1, 1936	Nobody's Fool	
June 14, 1936	Parole!	
July 1, 1936	The Cowboy and the Kid	
July 6, 1936	The Phantom Rider	
August 1, 1936	Crash Donovan	
August 16, 1936	Postal Inspector	
September 1, 1936	Yellowstone	
September 6, 1936	My Man Godfrey	
September 20, 1936	Ride 'Em Cowboy	
September 27, 1936	The Girl on the Front Page	
September 28, 1936	Sea Spoilers	
October 1, 1936	The Luckiest Girl in the World	
October 4, 1936	Two in a Crowd	
October 11, 1936	The Magnificent Brute	
October 19, 1936	Ace Drummond	
November 1, 1936	The Man I Marry	
November 8, 1936	Love Letters of a Star	
November 29, 1936	Conflict	
December 1, 1936	The Boss Rider of Gun Creek	
December 1, 1936	Flying Hostess	
December 3, 1936	Four Days' Wonder	
December 20, 1936	Empty Saddles	
December 20, 1936	Three Smart Girls	Nominee, Academy Award for Best Picture
December 27, 1936	Mysterious Crossing	

== 1937 ==
Release date	Title	Notes
January 17, 1937	The Mighty Treve	
January 18, 1937	Jungle Jim	
January 24, 1937	She's Dangerous	
February 1, 1937	Girl Overboard	
February 1, 1937	Breezing Home	
February 14, 1937	Sandflow	
March 28, 1937	When Love Is Young	
March 29, 1937	We Have Our Moments	
April 1, 1937	Left-Handed Law	
April 12, 1937	Secret Agent X-9	
April 16, 1937	California Straight Ahead!	
April 18, 1937	Top of the Town	
April 25, 1937	Let Them Live	
May 2, 1937	Night Key	
May 9, 1937	As Good as Married	
May 16, 1937	Oh, Doctor	
May 16, 1937	Wings over Honolulu	
May 30, 1937	The Man in Blue	
June 1, 1937	The Road Back	
June 1, 1937	Armored Car	
June 6, 1937	The Wildcatter	
June 6, 1937	Smoke Tree Range	
June 27, 1937	Love in a Bungalow	
July 4, 1937	I Cover the War	
July 5, 1937	Wild West Days	
July 11, 1937	West Bound Limited	
August 15, 1937	Reported Missing	
August 29, 1937	The Man Who Cried Wolf	
September 5, 1937	One Hundred Men and a Girl	Nominee, Academy Award for Best Picture
September 5, 1937	Black Aces	
September 26, 1937	Behind the Mike	
September 30, 1937	Idol of the Crowds	
October 1, 1937	The Lady Fights Back	
October 3, 1937	Carnival Queen	
October 10, 1937	Law for Tombstone	
October 15, 1937	Radio Patrol	
October 17, 1937	Trouble at Midnight	
October 21, 1937	That's My Story	
October 31, 1937	The Westland Case	last universal productions inc. film
November 1, 1937	Some Blondes Are Dangerous	first universal pictures company inc. film
November 1, 1937	A Girl with Ideas	
November 14, 1937	Merry-Go-Round of 1938	
December 1, 1937	Boss of Lonely Valley	
December 1, 1937	Sudden Bill Dorn	
December 1, 1937	Courage of the West	
December 5, 1937	Adventure's End	
December 12, 1937	Prescription for Romance	
December 26, 1937	You're a Sweetheart	
December 27, 1937	Tim Tyler's Luck	

== 1938 ==
Release date	Title	Notes
January 8, 1938	The Spy Ring	
January 16, 1938	The Jury's Secret	
January 23, 1938	The Singing Outlaw	
January 30, 1938	The Black Doll	
February 1, 1938	Mad About Music	
February 6, 1938	Midnight Intruder	
February 13, 1938	Forbidden Valley	
February 25, 1938	Border Wolves	
March 1, 1938	Reckless Living	
March 11, 1938	The Crime of Doctor Hallet	
March 18, 1938	State Police	
March 21, 1938	Flash Gordon's Trip to Mars	
April 1938	The Nurse from Brooklyn	
April 1, 1938	The Last Stand	
April 1, 1938	Goodbye Broadway	
April 22, 1938	The Lady in the Morgue	
May 13, 1938	Air Devils	
May 19, 1938	Sinners in Paradise	
June 1, 1938	Western Trails	
June 2, 1938	The Devil's Party	
June 3, 1938	Wives Under Suspicion	
June 17, 1938	Outlaw Express	
June 30, 1938	Young Fugitives	
July 1, 1938	The Rage of Paris	
July 1, 1938	Danger on the Air	
July 5, 1938	Flaming Frontiers	
July 12, 1938	Prison Break	
July 22, 1938	Little Tough Guy	
August 1938	The Road to Reno	
August 5, 1938	Letter of Introduction	
August 12, 1938	The Missing Guest	
September 2, 1938	Freshman Year	
September 9, 1938	Personal Secretary	
September 16, 1938	Black Bandit	
September 23, 1938	Youth Takes a Fling	
October 7, 1938	That Certain Age	
October 12, 1938	Service de Luxe	
October 14, 1938	Swing That Cheer	
October 18, 1938	Red Barry	
October 21, 1938	Guilty Trails	
October 28, 1938	The Last Express	
October 28, 1938	The Storm	
November 1, 1938	Little Tough Guys in Society	
November 4, 1938	Prairie Justice	
November 4, 1938	Exposed	
November 11, 1938	His Exciting Night	
November 13, 1938	Strange Faces	
December 2, 1938	Secrets of a Nurse	
December 16, 1938	Swing, Sister, Swing	
December 16, 1938	Ghost Town Riders	
December 16, 1938	Gambling Ship	
December 23, 1938	Newsboys' Home	

== 1939 ==
Release date	Title	Notes
January 1939	Pirates of the Skies	
January 6, 1939	The Last Warning	
January 7, 1939	The Phantom Creeps	Feature version of the film serial
January 13, 1939	Son of Frankenstein	
January 13, 1939	Honor of the West	
February 10, 1939	The Phantom Stage	
February 2, 1939	Buck Rogers	
February 18, 1939	You Can't Cheat an Honest Man	
March 1, 1939	Society Smugglers	
March 10, 1939	The Spirit of Culver	
March 3, 1939	Risky Business	
March 17, 1939	Mystery of the White Room	
March 24, 1939	Three Smart Girls Grow Up	
March 31, 1939	The Family Next Door	
April 7, 1939	East Side of Heaven	
April 14, 1939	Code of the Streets	
April 28, 1939	For Love or Money	
May 1, 1939	The Mikado	U.S. distribution
May 11, 1939	Big Town Czar	
May 20, 1939	They Asked for It	
May 31, 1939	The Sun Never Sets	
June 2, 1939	Inside Information	
June 14, 1939	Unexpected Father	
June 16, 1939	Ex-Champ	
June 30, 1939	The House of Fear	
July 4, 1939	The Oregon Trail	Serial film
July 7, 1939	The Forgotten Woman	
August 1, 1939	I Stole a Million	
August 11, 1939	When Tomorrow Comes	
September 1, 1939	Tropic Fury	
September 1, 1939	The Under-Pup	
September 2, 1939	Mutiny on the Blackhawk	
September 8, 1939	Hawaiian Nights	
September 21, 1939	Two Bright Boys	
September 22, 1939	The Witness Vanishes	
September 29, 1939	Rio	
October 1, 1939	Desperate Trails	
October 6, 1939	Hero for a Day	
October 10, 1939	Oklahoma Frontier	
October 27, 1939	Little Accident	
November 3, 1939	Legion of Lost Flyers	
November 4, 1939	Call a Messenger	
November 5, 1939	Scouts to the Rescue	
November 10, 1939	One Hour to Live	
November 10, 1939	First Love	
November 17, 1939	Tower of London	
December 1, 1939	Laugh It Off	
December 9, 1939	The Man from Montreal	
December 15, 1939	Missing Evidence	
December 22, 1939	The Big Guy	
December 29, 1939	Destry Rides Again	

== See also ==
- List of Focus Features films
- List of Universal Pictures theatrical animated feature films
- Universal Pictures
- Category:Lists of films by studio
