= Sudden Bill Dorn =

1937 film

- Directed by: Ray Taylor
- Written by: Frances Guihan; Jackson Gregory
- Produced by: Buck Jones; Irving Starr
- Starring: Buck Jones; Noel Francis; Evelyn Brent
- Cinematography: John Hickson; Allen Q. Thompson
- Edited by: Bernard Loftus
- Production company: Buck Jones Productions
- Distributed by: Universal Pictures
- Release date: December 1, 1937
- Running time: 60 minutes
- Country: United States
- Language: English

Sudden Bill Dorn is a 1937 American Western film by Universal Pictures directed by Ray Taylor and starring Buck Jones, Noel Francis and Evelyn Brent. The film has been described as "slow-paced" and "confusing" with the plot and storyline being difficult to follow, typical of Jones' later Universal output of which Sudden Bill Dorn was the last.

== Cast ==
- Buck Jones as Bill Dorn
- Noel Francis as Lorna Kent
- Evelyn Brent as Diana Viargas
- Frank McGlynn Sr. as Cap Jinks
- Lee Phelps as Ken Fairchild
- Harold Hodge as Mike Bundy
- Ted Adams as Henchman Fontana
- Mabel Colcord as Maggie
- W.E. Lawrence as Henchman Hank Smith
- Tom Chatterton as Morgan
- Ezra Paulette as Cowhand Curly
- Carlos De Valdez as Don Francisco Viargas
- Joe Bishop as Singing Cowhand Bud
- Charles Le Moyne as Sheriff MacArthur
