= Black Aces (film) =

1937 film directed by Buck Jones

- Theatrical release poster
- Directed by: Buck Jones
- Screenplay by: Frances Guihan
- Story by: Stephen Payne
- Produced by: Buck Jones
- Starring: Buck Jones; Kay Linaker; Robert Frazer; Raymond Brown; Fred MacKaye; Bob Kortman; Ben Corbett
- Cinematography: William A. Sickner; Allen Q. Thompson
- Edited by: Bernard Loftus
- Production company: Universal Pictures
- Distributed by: Universal Pictures
- Release date: September 5, 1937
- Running time: 59 minutes
- Country: United States
- Language: English

Black Aces is a 1937 American Western film directed by Buck Jones and written by Frances Guihan. The film stars Buck Jones, Kay Linaker, Robert Frazer, Raymond Brown, Fred MacKaye, Bob Kortman and Ben Corbett. The film was released on September 5, 1937, by Universal Pictures.

== Plot ==
Rancher Ted Ames and the daughter of a rancher Sandy McKenzie get involved with the notorious blackmailing gang the Black Aces.

== Cast ==
- Buck Jones as Ted Ames
- Kay Linaker as Sandy McKenzie
- Robert Frazer as Homer Truesdale
- Raymond Brown as Henry Kline
- Fred MacKaye as Len Stoddard
- Bob Kortman as Wolf Whalen
- Ben Corbett as Bridge Guard
- W. E. Lawrence as Henchman Boyd Loomis
- Frank Campeau as Cowhand Ike Bowlaigs
- Robert McKenzie as Mailman Hank Farnum
- Charles Le Moyne as Sheriff Joe Potter
- Lee Shumway as Henchman
- Arthur Van Slyke as Prospector Silver-Tip Joe
- Charles King as Jess Walker
- Barney Phillips as Jake Stoddard
- Silver as Silver
