= Left-Handed Law =

1937 film directed by Lesley Selander

- Directed by: Lesley Selander
- Screenplay by: Frances Guihan
- Based on: Left Handed Law by Charles M. Martin
- Produced by: Buck Jones; Irving Starr
- Starring: Buck Jones; Noel Francis; Nina Quartero; Frank LaRue; Lee Shumway; Robert Frazer; Lee Phelps; George Regas; Matty Fain
- Cinematography: William A. Sickner; Allen Q. Thompson
- Edited by: Bernard Loftus
- Production company: Universal Pictures
- Distributed by: Universal Pictures
- Release date: April 1, 1937
- Running time: 62 minutes
- Country: United States
- Language: English

Left-Handed Law is a 1937 American Western film directed by Lesley Selander and written by Frances Guihan. It is based on the 1936 novel Left Handed Law by Charles M. Martin. The film stars Buck Jones, Noel Francis, Nina Quartero, Frank LaRue, Lee Shumway, Robert Frazer, Lee Phelps, George Regas and Matty Fain. The film was released on April 1, 1937, by Universal Pictures.

== Plot ==
Wells Fargo sends agent Alamo Bowie in order to stop "One-Shot" Brady and his gang, after following a couple clues, Alamo gets into a showdown with Brady.

== Cast ==
- Buck Jones as Alamo Bowie
- Noel Francis as Betty Golden
- Nina Quartero as Chiquita
- Frank LaRue as John Golden
- Lee Shumway as Pecos Brown
- Robert Frazer as Tom Willis
- Lee Phelps as Sheriff Joe Grant
- George Regas as Sam Logan
- Matty Fain as 'One-Shot' Brady
- W. E. Lawrence as Henchman
- Charles Le Moyne as Brazos
- Harold Hodge as Hank
- Silver as Silver
