= The Throwback (1935 film) =

1935 film by Ray Taylor

- Theatrical release poster
- Directed by: Ray Taylor
- Screenplay by: Frances Guihan
- Story by: Cherry Wilson
- Produced by: Buck Jones
- Starring: Buck Jones; Muriel Evans; George "Gabby" Hayes; Bryant Washburn; Eddie Phillips; Paul Fix
- Cinematography: Herbert Kirkpatrick; Allen Q. Thompson; William A. Sickner
- Edited by: Bernard Loftus
- Music by: David Klatzkin; Oliver Wallace
- Production company: Universal Pictures
- Distributed by: Universal Pictures
- Release date: October 1, 1935
- Running time: 61 minutes
- Country: United States
- Language: English

The Throwback is a 1935 American Western film directed by Ray Taylor, written by Frances Guihan, and starring Buck Jones, Muriel Evans, George "Gabby" Hayes, Bryant Washburn, Eddie Phillips and Paul Fix. It was released on October 1, 1935, by Universal Pictures.

== Cast ==
- Buck Jones as Buck Saunders
- Muriel Evans as Muriel Fergus
- George "Gabby" Hayes as Ford Cruze
- Bryant Washburn as Jack Thorne
- Eddie Phillips as Milt Fergus
- Paul Fix as Spike Travis
- Charles K. French as Buck's Foster Father
- Frank LaRue as Tom Fergus
- Robert Walker as Sheriff Carey
- Earl Pingree as Jim Saunders
- Allan Ramsay as Young Buck Saunders
- Margaret Davis as Young Muriel Fergus
- Bobby Nelson as Young Milt Fergus
- Mickey Martin as Spike, as a boy
- Silver as Silver
