= Gambling Ship =

Gambling Ship may refer to:

- Gambling ship, a ship that circumvents anti-gambling laws by sailing outside their jurisdiction
- Gambling Ship (1933 film), an American drama film
- Gambling Ship (1938 film), an American mystery film
