= Muriel Evans =

American actress (1910–2000)

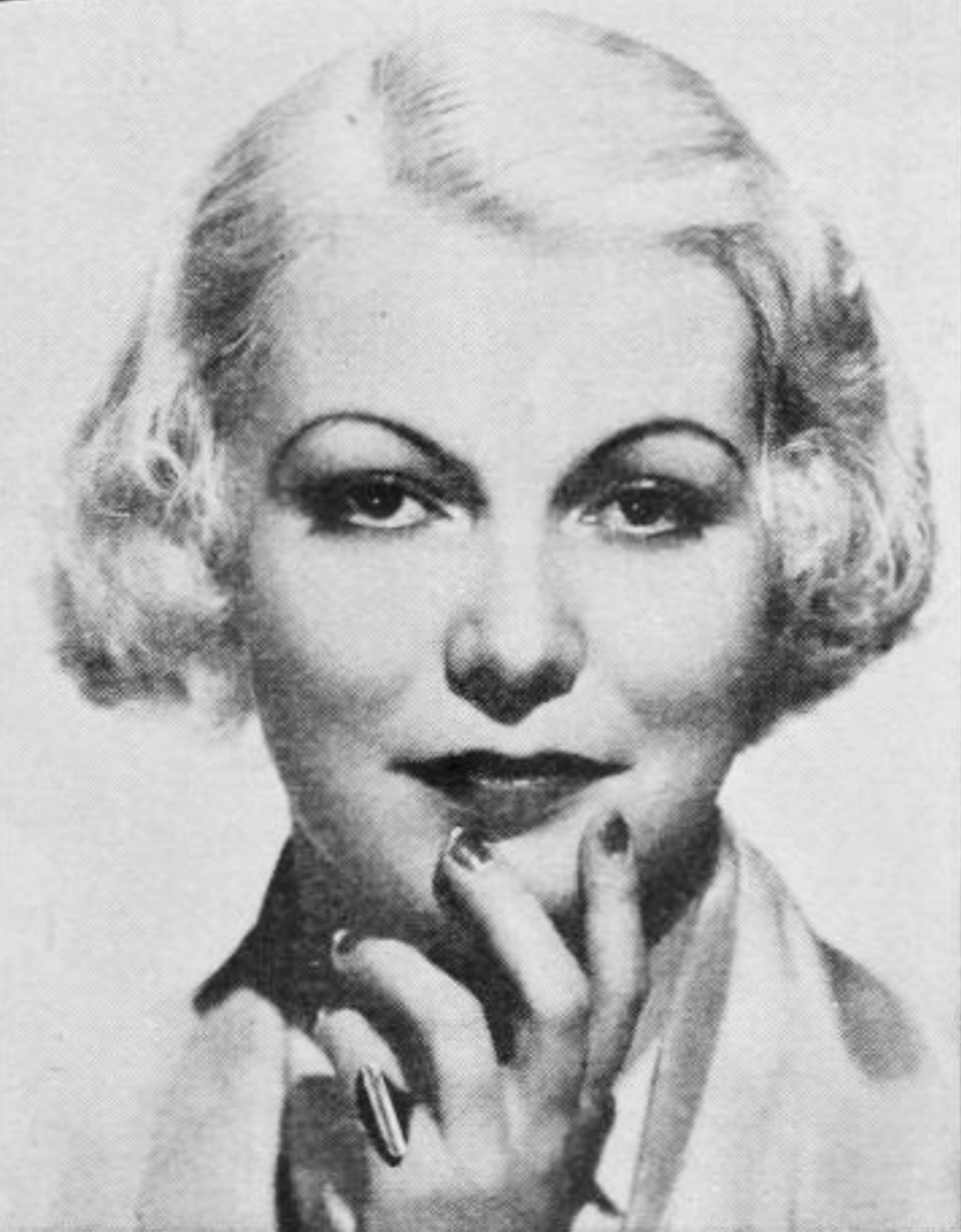
- Evans in 1934
- Born: Muriel Adele Evanson; July 20, 1910; Minneapolis, Minnesota, U.S.
- Died: October 26, 2000 (aged 90); Woodland Hills, Los Angeles, California, U.S.
- Occupation: Actress
- Years active: 1929–1946
- Spouses: Michael J. P. Cudahy (m. 1929; div. 1930) Marshall R. Worcester (m. 1936; died 1971)

Muriel Evans (born Muriel Adele Evanson; July 20, 1910 – October 26, 2000) was an American film actress. She is best known for her many appearances in popular westerns of the 1930s for which she won a Golden Boot Award.

== Early life and career ==
Evans was born in Minneapolis, Minnesota to Norwegian immigrant parents. Her father died when she was only two months old, forcing her mother to move to California to find work, where Evans' mother took a job as a maid at First National Studios. She spent her afternoons on film sets and was soon noticed by a studio executive. The executive introduced her to the director Robert Z. Leonard, who gave her a small role opposite Corinne Griffith in the 1926 film, Mademoiselle Modiste. She continued attending classes at Hollywood High School and landing bit parts in stock theater productions and silent films.

In 1929, Evans co-starred in the silent, comedic short films, Good Night Nurse and Joyland, starring Lupino Lane. Shortly after completing Joyland, Evans put her acting career on hold to finish school. In July 1929, Evans announced her engagement to Michael J. P. Cudahy, the grandson of Michael Cudahy, one of the founders of the Cudahy Packing Company. They were married on July 7, 1929 in Riverside, California. Evans and Cudahy traveled the world and settled in Paris. In 1930, they returned to the United States and Evans filed for divorce. Their divorce was finalized in October 1930. Evans, who gave up her career upon her marriage, returned to Hollywood, signed a contract at MGM and began making films again.

Muriel Evans with Charley Chase in the 1933 film Nature in the Wrong

In March 1932, Evans (and 11 other actresses) won a two-day beauty contest sponsored by Paramount Pictures, after which she starred in six films, most notably Young Ironsides with Charley Chase and Pack Up Your Troubles with Laurel and Hardy. She would go on to star in eight more shorts with Chase before his death in 1940.

Evans' success was due in large part to her pleasant speaking voice. She made a smooth transition from silent pictures to talkies, and throughout the 1930s, Evans continued to work steadily. She appeared in Frank Capra's Mr. Deeds Goes to Town, Manhattan Melodrama with Clark Gable and William Powell, and The Prizefighter and the Lady with Myrna Loy. By the mid-1930s, Evans also began co-starring in popular westerns alongside Tom Mix, John Wayne and Tex Ritter. She also starred in three Hopalong Cassidy films opposite William Boyd, and did seven westerns with Buck Jones.

== Later years ==
Muriel Evans with James Ellison in the 1936 film Three on the Trail

In 1936, Evans married a theatrical agent, Marshall R. Worcester. By age 30, she retired from acting. One of her last film appearances came in 1946, in the Pete Smith short, Studio Visit. Soon after retiring, Evans and her husband settled in Washington, D.C. Over the next decade, she starred in four radio shows and in the television show Hollywood Reporter. In 1951, the couple moved back to Hollywood, although Evans never resumed her acting career. Eventually, the couple bought property in Tarzana, California, where Evans dabbled in real estate.

After the death of her husband in 1971, Evans began work as a volunteer nurse at the Motion Picture and Television Country House and Hospital in Woodland Hills not far from her home. After a stroke in 1994, she became a resident within the complex and often dined with fellow actors with whom she had once worked, including Anita Garvin. In 1999, Evans made her last film appearance in a 2000 documentary, I Used to Be in Pictures, in which she was one of many former actors who recalled their experiences in the film work.

== Death ==
On October 26, 2000, Muriel Evans died of colon cancer at the Motion Picture and Television Country House and Hospital in Woodland Hills, California. She was 90 years old.

== Filmography ==
Year	Title	Role	Notes
1928	Wife Trouble		Short
1929	Good Night Nurse		Short
1929	Joyland		Short
1932	Sinners in the Sun	Fashion Model	Uncredited
1932	Young Ironsides	Muriel Evans	Short
1932	Pack Up Your Troubles	Wrong Eddie's bride	
1932	Hot Spot	Wife	Short
1932	Girl Grief	Miss Evans	Short
1932	Now We'll Tell One	Muriel Evans	Short
1932	Mr. Bride	Muriel Evans	Short
1933	Fallen Arches	Muriel Gilbert	Short
1933	Fast Workers	Nurse	
1933	Nature In the Wrong	Muriel	Short; Alternative title: Tarzan In the Wrong
1933	His Silent Racket	Muriel	Short
1933	Arabian Tights	Miss Evans	Short
1933	Thundering Taxis	Mrs. Blacker	Short
1933	Broadway to Hollywood	Maid	Uncredited; Alternative title: Ring Up the Curtain
1933	The Prizefighter and the Lady	Linda	Alternative title: Every Woman's Man
1933	Dancing Lady	Chorus Girl	Uncredited
1933	The Women in His Life	Molly	
1933	Queen Christina	Barmaid at Inn	Uncredited
1934	Heat Lightning	Blonde Cutie	
1934	Manhattan Melodrama	Tootsie Malone	
1934	The Big Idea	Honey, Ted's Fiancee	Short
1934	Hollywood Party	Show Girl	Uncredited
1934	Attention Suckers	Demonstration Watcher	Short
1934	Hide-Out	Baby	
1934	Have a Heart	Helen, Schauber's Secretary	
1935	The Roaring West	Mary Parker	Serial
1935	The Throwback	Muriel Fergus	
1935	Nurse to You!	Muriel Chase	Short
1935	The New Frontier	Hanna Lewis	
1936	Silver Spurs	Janet Allison	Alternative title: Silverspurs
1936	Call of the Prairie	Linda McHenry	
1936	King of the Pecos	Belle Jackson	
1936	Mr. Deeds Goes to Town	Theresa	Uncredited
1936	Three on the Trail	Mary Stevens	
1936	Two-Fisted Gentleman	June Prentice	
1936	Missing Girls	Dorothy Benson	Alternative title: When Girls Leave Home
1936	House of Secrets	Julie Kenmore	
1936	Under Your Spell	Governess	Uncredited
1936	The Boss Rider of Gun Creek	Starr Landerson	
1936	Ten Laps to Go	Norma Corbett	Alternative title: King of the Speedway
1936	Don't Be Like That	The Faithful Wife	Short
1936	Headline Crasher	Edith Arlen	
1936	Robin Hood, Jr.		
1937	Rich Relations	Trixie Lane	
1937	Smoke Tree Range	Nan Page	
1937	Rustlers' Valley	Agnes Randall	
1937	Law for Tombstone	Nellie Gray	
1937	Boss of Lonely Valley	Retta Lowrey	
1939	Home Boner	Mrs. Errol	Short
1939	The Rookie Cop	Fern, Joey's Girl	Alternative title: Swift Vengeance
1939	Chicken Feed	Girlfriend	Short
1939	Westbound Stage	Joan Hale	
1939	Dog-Gone	Miriam Jones	Short
1940	Roll Wagons Roll	Ruth Benson	Alternative title: Roll Covered Wagon
