= Ride 'Em Cowboy =

Ride 'Em Cowboy may refer to:

- Ride 'Em Cowboy (1936 film), a 1936 Western film starring Buck Jones
- Ride 'Em Cowboy (1942 film), a 1942 Abbott and Costello film
- Ride 'Em Cowboy (song), a 1974 song written and recorded by Paul Davis
- Ride 'Em Cowboy, the third album by singer-songwriter Paul Davis

== See also ==
- Ride Him, Cowboy - a 1932 film starring John Wayne
