= Missing girls =

Missing girls may refer to:

- Missing women of Asia, a shortfall in the number of women in Asia relative to the number that would be expected if there was no sex-selective abortion or female infanticide or if the newborn of both sexes received similar levels of health care and nutrition
- Missing Girls, a 1936 American film directed by Phil Rosen
