= The Cowboy and the Kid =

1936 film directed by Ray Taylor

- Theatrical release poster
- Directed by: Ray Taylor
- Screenplay by: Frances Guihan
- Story by: Buck Jones
- Produced by: Buck Jones
- Starring: Buck Jones; Bill Burrud; Dorothy Revier; Harry Worth; Oliver Eckhardt; Mary Mersch
- Cinematography: Herbert Kirkpatrick; Allen Q. Thompson
- Edited by: Bernard Loftus
- Production company: Universal Pictures
- Distributed by: Universal Pictures
- Release date: July 1, 1936
- Running time: 58 minutes
- Country: United States
- Language: English

The Cowboy and the Kid is a 1936 American Western film directed by Ray Taylor and written by Frances Guihan. The film stars Buck Jones, Bill Burrud, Dorothy Revier, Harry Worth, Oliver Eckhardt and Mary Mersch. The film was released on July 1, 1936, by Universal Pictures.

== Cast ==
- Buck Jones as Steve Davis
- Bill Burrud as Jimmy Thomas
- Dorothy Revier as June Caldwell
- Harry J. Worth as Jess Watson
- Oliver Eckhardt as Dr. Wilson
- Mary Mersch as Mrs. Wilson
- Burr Caruth as Judge Talbot
- Kernan Cripps as Jim Thomas
- Lafe McKee as Sheriff Bailey
- Silver as Silver
