= When a Man Sees Red =

When a Man Sees Red may refer to:

- When a Man Sees Red (1917 film), an American silent drama film
- When a Man Sees Red (1934 film), an American Western film
