= The Roaring West =

1935 film

- Theatrical release poster
- Directed by: Ray Taylor
- Written by: George H. Plympton; Nate Gatzert; Basil Dickey; Ella O'Neill; Robert C. Rothafel; Ed Earl Repp
- Produced by: Henry MacRae
- Starring: Buck Jones; Muriel Evans; Frank McGlynn Sr. Walter Miller
- Cinematography: Richard Fryer; William A. Sickner
- Edited by: Irving Applebaum; Saul A. Goodkind; Alvin Todd; Edward Todd
- Music by: David Klatzkin
- Distributed by: Universal Pictures
- Release date: July 8, 1935
- Running time: 15 chapters (310 minutes)
- Country: United States
- Language: English

The Roaring West is a 1935 American Western film serial starring Buck Jones as Montana Larkin. It co-stars his horse, Silver, and Frank McGlynn Sr. as his trusty sidekick Jinglebob Morgan. The film was released by Universal.

== Cast ==
- Buck Jones as Montana Larkin
- Silver as Silver, Montana's horse
- Muriel Evans as Mary Parker
- Frank McGlynn Sr. as Jinglebob Morgan
- Walter Miller as Gil Gillespie
- Eole Galli as Ann Hardy
- Harlan Knight as Clem Morgan
- Fred Santley as a saloon singer
- William Desmond as Jim Parker
- Pat J. O'Brien as Cowhand Steve
- Tiny Skelton as Cowhand Happy
- Charles King as Henchman Tex
- William L. Thorne as Marco Brett
- George Ovey as Cowhand Shorty
- Dick Rush as Sheriff Clark

== Production ==
=== Stunts ===
- Cliff Lyons doubling Buck Jones
- Babe DeFreest
- Wally West

== Chapter titles ==
1. The Land Rush
2. The Torrent of Terror
3. Flaming Peril
4. Stampede of Death
5. Danger in the Dark
6. Death Rides the Plains
7. Hurled to the Depths
8. Ravaging Flames
9. Death Holds the Reins
10. The Fatal Blast
11. The Baited Trap
12. The Mystery Shot
13. Flaming Torrents
14. Thundering Fury
15. The Conquering Cowpokes

_{Source:}

== See also ==
- List of film serials
- List of film serials by studio

Preceded by The Call of the Savage (1935)	Universal Serial; The Roaring West (1935)	Succeeded by Tailspin Tommy in the Great Air Mystery (1935)
