= Sandflow =

1937 film by Lesley Selander

- Theatrical release poster
- Directed by: Lesley Selander
- Screenplay by: Frances Guihan
- Based on: Starr of the Southwest by Cherry Wilson
- Produced by: Buck Jones
- Starring: Buck Jones; Lita Chevret; Bob Kortman; Arthur Aylesworth; Bob Terry; Enrique de Rosas
- Cinematography: Herbert Kirkpatrick; Allen Q. Thompson
- Edited by: Bernard Loftus
- Production company: Universal Pictures
- Distributed by: Universal Pictures
- Release date: February 14, 1937
- Running time: 58 minutes
- Country: United States
- Language: English

Sandflow is a 1937 American Western film directed by Lesley Selander and written by Frances Guihan. The film stars Buck Jones, Lita Chevret, Bob Kortman, Arthur Aylesworth, Bob Terry and Enrique de Rosas. The film was released on February 14, 1937, by Universal Pictures.

== Plot ==
Lane Hallett is wanted for killing the Sheriff, however his brother Buck thinks he is innocent and sets out to prove it, but while he is out Quayle is after Lane for the reward money.

== Cast ==
- Buck Jones as Buck Hallett
- Lita Chevret as Rose Porter
- Bob Kortman as Quayle
- Arthur Aylesworth as Tex
- Bob Terry as Lane Hallett
- Enrique de Rosas as Joaquin
- Josef Swickard as Banker Porter
- Lee Phelps as Singing Guard
- Harold Hodge as Rillito
- Tom Chatterton as Sheriff
- Arthur Van Slyke as Santone
- Malcolm Graham as Parable
- Silver as Silver
