= A Man Four-Square =

1926 film

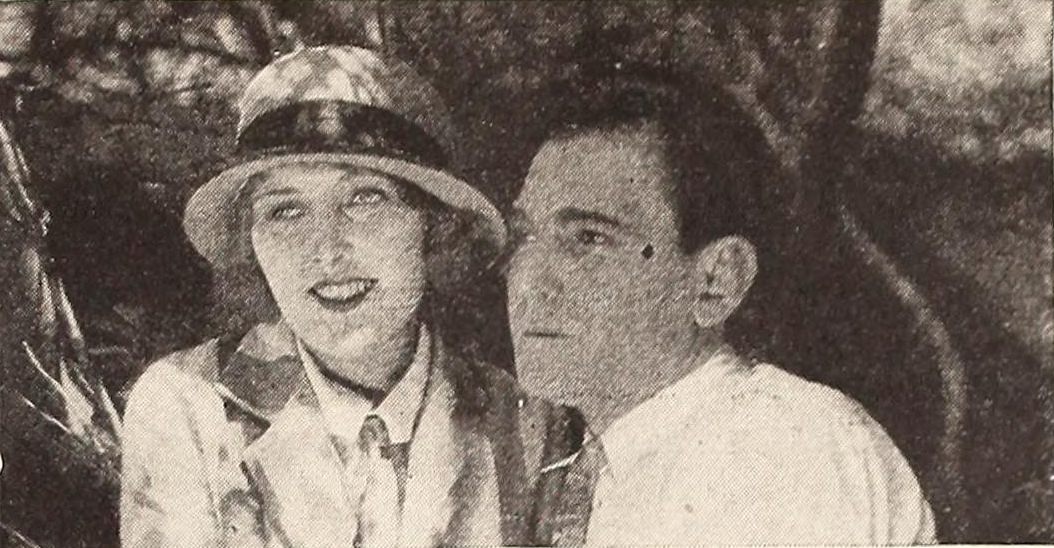
- Florence Gilbert and Buck Jones
- Directed by: Roy William Neill
- Written by: Charles Darnton; William MacLeod Raine (novel); John Stone
- Produced by: William Fox
- Starring: Buck Jones; Marion Harlan; Harry Woods
- Cinematography: Reginald Lyons
- Production company: Fox Film
- Distributed by: Fox Film
- Release date: May 9, 1926
- Running time: 50 minutes
- Country: United States
- Language: Silent (English intertitles)

A Man Four-Square is a lost 1926 American silent Western film directed by Roy William Neill and starring Buck Jones, Marion Harlan, and Harry Woods.

== Plot ==
As described in a film magazine review, Craig Norton ends his vacation in New York early to return and straighten out matters at his ranch in the West. His neighbor Wallace Roberts accuses his men of rustling his cattle. Craig defends his foreman Jim Clanton against the accusations of Ben Taylor, foreman at the Roberts ranch. Roberts and Taylor plot to capture Craig and Clanton, who are hiding in a mountain cabin while Clanton nurses a broken ankle. Bertie Roberts, daughter of Wallace but in love with Craig, rides out to the cabin and warns the two that they have been located. Craig stands his ground when the fight comes, and Roberts discharges Taylor for firing the shack and endangering the young woman's life. Taylor later convinces Clanton to "get" Craig because he has taken his girl, but the scheme falls through. When Taylor dies the death of the rustler, Clanton makes up with Craig, and Craig and Bertie find happiness together.

== Cast ==
- Buck Jones as Craig Norton
- Marion Harlan as Polly
- Harry Woods as Ben Taylor
- W.E. Lawrence as Jim Clanton
- Jay Hunt as Polly's Father
- Sidney Bracey as Homer Webb
- Florence Gilbert as Bertie Roberts
- Frank Beal as Wallace Roberts

== Preservation ==
With no prints of A Man Four-Square located in any film archives, it is a lost film.

== Bibliography ==
- Solomon, Aubrey. The Fox Film Corporation, 1915-1935: A History and Filmography. McFarland, 2011.
