= Rocky Rhodes =

1934 film

- Directed by: Alfred Raboch
- Screenplay by: Edward Churchill
- Story by: W. C. Tuttle
- Produced by: Buck Jones; Irving Starr
- Starring: Buck Jones; Sheila Terry; Stanley Fields; Walter Miller; Alfred P. James; Paul Fix
- Cinematography: Ted D. McCord
- Edited by: Ray Snyder
- Production company: Universal Pictures
- Distributed by: Universal Pictures
- Release date: September 24, 1934
- Running time: 64 minutes
- Country: United States
- Language: English

Rocky Rhodes is a 1934 American Western film directed by Alfred Raboch and written by Edward Churchill. The film stars Buck Jones, Sheila Terry, Stanley Fields, Walter Miller, Alfred P. James and Paul Fix. The film was released on September 24, 1934, by Universal Pictures.

== Cast ==
- Buck Jones as Rocky Rhodes
- Sheila Terry as Nan Street
- Stanley Fields as Harp Haverty
- Walter Miller as Dan Murtch
- Alfred P. James as John Street
- Paul Fix as Joe Hilton
- Lydia Knott as Mrs. Rhodes
- Lee Shumway as Henchman Stark
- Jack Rockwell as Sheriff Reed
- Carl Stockdale as Lawyer Bowles
- Monte Montague as Henchman Jake
- Bud Osborne as Henchman Red
- Harry Semels as Dick Boggs
- Silver as Silver
