= The Last Straw (1920 film) =

1920 film

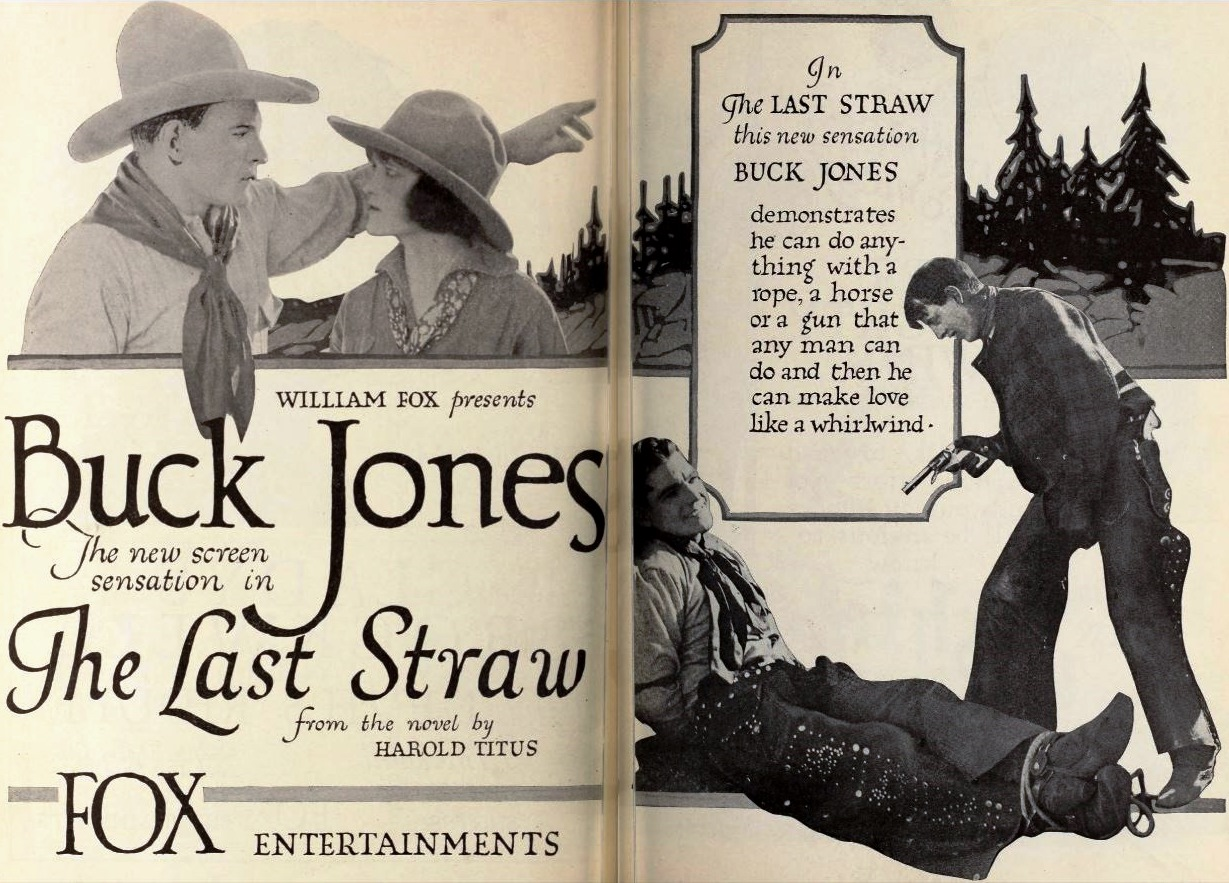
- Advertisement
- Directed by: Denison Clift; Charles Swickard
- Written by: Denison Clift; Charles Swickard; Harold Titus
- Starring: Buck Jones; Vivian Rich; Jane Talent
- Cinematography: Vernon L. Walker
- Production company: Fox Film Corporation
- Distributed by: Fox Film Corporation
- Release date: February 14, 1920
- Running time: 50 minutes
- Country: United States
- Languages: Silent; English intertitles
- Budget: $31,000

The Last Straw is a lost 1920 American silent Western film directed by Denison Clift and Charles Swickard and starring Buck Jones, Vivian Rich, and Jane Talent. It cost $31,000 to make, considerably exceeding its planned budget. It was Jones' first starring role.

== Plot ==
As described in a film magazine, Tom Beck is one of the cowboys on the H O ranch in Montana who does not believe in taking a chance. On the arrival of Jane Hunter, a young New York woman who has inherited the property from her uncle, at the ranch she watches as four men draw straws to see who will be the ranch foreman. Tom refuses to take a chance on drawing the last straw and loses the job as it was the short one. Hepburn, whom Tom suspects of conniving with cattle rustlers in their attempt to gain part of the H O ranch, is made foreman. Tom, however, becomes Jane's confidant. His refusal to let her drink and smoke, which she had been accustomed to do in New York, wins her admiration. Dick Hilton, an insipid New York millionaire who Jane had refused to marry after becoming financially dependent, follows her to Montana. He scorns at her praise of Tom, and when Jane refuses to tolerate his amours, he attempts to force them upon her. Tom intervenes and throws Dick from the house. Dick then turns his attentions on Bobby, the daughter of the squatter Alf Cole who is the tool of the rustlers. Hepburn then resigns as foreman and Tom is given charge. He scents trouble from this action and informs Jane that he is going to the rustlers' cabin to make settlement. Jane gives him a locket for good luck, informing Tom that he is not to open it. At the cabin of the rustlers Dick attempts to kill Tom and in the shooting affray Tom manages to escape only to be captured by another of his enemies. While he is absent from the ranch, the other men capture the squatter Alf, and he is put on trial with Jane acting as judge. She acquits him, an act which touches the heart of Bobby, who had been angered by the relations between Jane and Dick. After escaping from the ropes used to bind him, Tom arrives at the H O ranch in time to join in another shooting affray. He is taking Jane to a safe place when Dick sneaks up from the back to kill him. Bobby, despite her love for Dick, sees this and shoots him. Tom and Jane return to a cabin and Tom, after Jane reveals the content of the locket as being the last straw, says that he is now ready to take a chance.

== Cast ==
- Buck Jones as Tom Beck
- Vivian Rich as Jane Hunter
- Jane Talent as Bobby Cole
- Colin Kenny as Dick Hilton
- Charles Le Moyne as Hepburn
- James Robert Chandler as Alf Cole
- William Gillis as Two Bits
- Slim Padgett as Sam McKee
- Hank Bell as Pat Webb
- Zeib Morris as Riley
- Lon Poff as Rev. Beal

== Bibliography ==
- Solomon, Aubrey. The Fox Film Corporation, 1915-1935. A History and Filmography. McFarland & Co, 2011.
