= The Jury's Secret =

1938 film by Edward Sloman

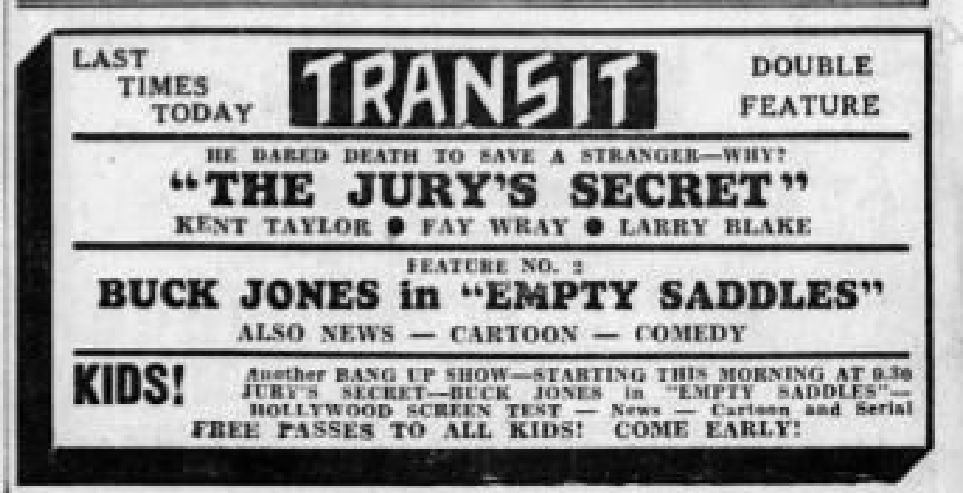
- Newspaper advertisement for The Jury's Secret and Empty Saddles (1936)
- Directed by: Edward Sloman
- Written by: Newman Levy
- Starring: Kent Taylor; Fay Wray; Jane Darwell
- Cinematography: Milton R. Krasner
- Distributed by: Universal Pictures
- Release date: January 16, 1938 (United States)
- Running time: 65 minutes
- Country: United States
- Language: English

The Jury's Secret is a 1938 American drama film directed by Edward Sloman and starring Kent Taylor, Fay Wray, and Jane Darwell.

== Cast ==
- Kent Taylor as Walter Rusell
- Fay Wray as Linda Ware
- Jane Darwell as Mrs. Sheldon
- Nan Grey as Mary Norris
- Larry J. Blake as Bill Sheldon
- Fritz Leiber (Sr.) as John Morrow
- Leonard Mudie as District Attorney
- Samuel S. Hinds as Brandon Williams
- Granville Bates as Judge Pendegast
- Halliwell Hobbes as John
- Edward Broadley as William's Butler
- Ted Osborne as Reporter Thompson
- William B. Davidson as Page
