= Smoke Tree Range =

Film directed by Lesley Selander

- Theatrical release poster
- Directed by: Lesley Selander
- Screenplay by: Frances Guihan
- Story by: Arthur Henry Gooden
- Produced by: Buck Jones
- Starring: Buck Jones; Muriel Evans; John Elliott; Dick Jones; Donald Kirke; Ted Adams; Ben Hall
- Cinematography: William A. Sickner; Allen Q. Thompson
- Edited by: Bernard Loftus
- Production company: Universal Pictures
- Distributed by: Universal Pictures
- Release date: June 6, 1937
- Running time: 59 minutes
- Country: United States
- Language: English

Smoke Tree Range is a 1937 American Western film directed by Lesley Selander and written by Frances Guihan. The film stars Buck Jones, Muriel Evans, John Elliott, Dick Jones, Donald Kirke, Ted Adams and Ben Hall. The film was released on June 6, 1937, by Universal Pictures.

== Cast ==
- Buck Jones as Lee Cary
- Muriel Evans as Nan Page
- John Elliott as Jim Cary
- Dick Jones as Teddy Page
- Donald Kirke as Wirt Stoner
- Ted Adams as Gil Hawkins
- Ben Hall as Pete
- Mabel Colcord as Ma Kelly
- Earle Hodgins as Sheriff Day
- Bob Kortman as Henchman Paso Wells
- Edmund Cobb as Sandy
- Eddie Phillips as Sandy's friend
- Robert McKenzie as Storekeeper Dick
- Slim Whitaker as Henchman Ferguson
- Silver Jr. as Silver
