= The New Frontier (film) =

1935 film

- Theatrical poster
- Directed by: Carl Pierson
- Written by: Robert Emmett Tansey
- Produced by: Trem Carr; Paul Malvern
- Starring: John Wayne
- Cinematography: Harry Neumann; Gus Peterson
- Edited by: Gerald Roberts
- Distributed by: Republic Pictures
- Release date: October 5, 1935
- Running time: 54 minutes
- Country: United States
- Language: English

The New Frontier is a 1935 American Western film starring John Wayne, directed by Carl Pierson for Republic Pictures. (In 1939, Wayne appeared in a Three Mesquiteers movie titled New Frontier, which years later was retitled Frontier Horizon to avoid confusion.)

== Cast ==
- John Wayne as John Dawson
- Muriel Evans as Hanna Lewis
- Warner Richmond as Ace Holmes
- Al Bridge as Kit
- Sam Flint as Milt Dawson
- Murdock MacQuarrie as Tom Lewis
- Allan Cavan as Minister Shaw
- Mary MacLaren as Mrs. Shaw
- Theodore Lorch as Joe
- Glenn Strange as Norton
- Philip Kieffer as Army Officer
- Frank Ball as Ted
