= Silver Spurs (1936 film) =

1936 film by Ray Taylor

- Theatrical release poster
- Directed by: Ray Taylor
- Screenplay by: Joseph F. Poland
- Story by: Charles Alden Seltzer
- Produced by: Buck Jones; Irving Starr
- Starring: Buck Jones; Muriel Evans; George "Gabby" Hayes; J. P. McGowan; Robert Frazer; W. E. Lawrence
- Cinematography: Herbert Kirkpatrick; Allen Q. Thompson
- Edited by: Bernard Loftus
- Production company: Universal Pictures
- Distributed by: Universal Pictures
- Release date: January 29, 1936
- Running time: 60 minutes
- Country: United States
- Language: English

Silver Spurs is a 1936 American Western film directed by Ray Taylor and written by Joseph F. Poland. Starring Buck Jones, Muriel Evans, George "Gabby" Hayes, J. P. McGowan, Robert Frazer and W. E. Lawrence, it was released on January 29, 1936, by Universal Pictures.

== Cast ==
- Buck Jones as Jim Fentriss
- Muriel Evans as Janet Allison
- George "Gabby" Hayes as Drag Harlan
- J. P. McGowan as Webb Allison
- Robert Frazer as Art Holden aka Silverspurs
- W. E. Lawrence as Henchman Snell
- Beth Marion as Peggy Wyman
- Earl Askam as Henchman Durango
- Bruce Lane as Yuma Kid
- Dennis Moore as Dude
- Robert McKenzie as Station Agent
