= Irving Starr =

American film producer

- Born: November 22, 1905; New York City, United States
- Died: January 17, 1982 (aged 76); United States
- Occupation: Producer
- Years active: 1933–1966 (film)

Irving Starr (1905–1982) was an American film producer. He worked for a number of studios including MGM, Universal Pictures and Columbia Pictures, generally employed on lower-budget films. Later in his career he also worked in television.

== Selected filmography ==
- Tombstone Canyon (1932)
- Fargo Express (1933)
- The Lone Avenger (1933)
- King of the Arena (1933)
- Phantom Thunderbolt (1933)
- The Fiddlin' Buckaroo (1933)
- When a Man Sees Red (1934)
- Rocky Rhodes (1934)
- His Night Out (1935)
- Border Brigands (1934)
- Stone of Silver Creek (1935)
- Empty Saddles (1936)
- Silver Spurs (1936)
- Ride 'Em Cowboy (1936)
- Nobody's Fool (1936)
- For the Service (1936)
- Damaged Goods (1937)
- The Westland Case (1937)
- Boss of Lonely Valley (1937)
- Left-Handed Law (1937)
- The Black Doll (1938)
- Danger on the Air (1938)
- The Last Warning (1938)
- The Lady in the Morgue (1938)
- The Last Express (1938)
- Gambling Ship (1938)
- Mystery of the White Room (1939)
- The Witness Vanishes (1939)
- Inside Information (1939)
- Music in My Heart (1940)
- Time Out for Rhythm (1941)
- Our Wife (1941)
- Fingers at the Window (1942)
- Sunday Punch (1942)
- The Affairs of Martha (1942)
- Bataan (1943)
- Harrigan's Kid (1943)
- Swing Fever (1943)
- Something for the Boys (1944)
- Four Jills in a Jeep (1944)
- The Cockeyed Miracle (1946)
- The Gallant Blade (1948)
- Johnny Allegro (1949)
- Slightly French (1949)
- The Half-Breed (1952)
- Battles of Chief Pontiac (1952)
- A Story of David (1960)
- Return of the Gunfighter (1966)

== Bibliography ==
- Hischak, Thomas S. American Plays and Musicals on Screen: 650 Stage Productions and Their Film and Television Adaptations. McFarland & Company, 2005.
