= The Crimson Trail =

1935 American Western film

- Theatrical release poster
- Directed by: Alfred Raboch
- Screenplay by: Jack Natteford
- Story by: Wilton West
- Produced by: Buck Jones
- Starring: Buck Jones; Polly Ann Young; Ward Bond; John Bleifer; Paul Fix; Carl Stockdale
- Cinematography: John Hickson
- Edited by: Bernard Loftus
- Production company: Universal Pictures
- Distributed by: Universal Pictures
- Release date: March 11, 1935
- Running time: 60 minutes
- Country: United States
- Language: English

The Crimson Trail is a 1935 American Western film directed by Alfred Raboch and written by Jack Natteford. The film stars Buck Jones, Polly Ann Young, Ward Bond, John Bleifer, Paul Fix and Carl Stockdale. The film was released on March 11, 1935, by Universal Pictures.

== Cast ==
- Buck Jones as Billy Carter
- Polly Ann Young as Kitty Bellair
- Ward Bond as Luke Long
- John Bleifer as Loco
- Paul Fix as Paul
- Carl Stockdale as Jim Bellair
- Charles K. French as Frank Carter
- Charles Brinley as Tom
- Bob Kortman as Henchman Cal
- Bud Osborne as Henchman Jack
