= For the Service =

1936 film by Buck Jones

- Theatrical release poster
- Directed by: Buck Jones; Irving Starr
- Screenplay by: Isadore Bernstein
- Produced by: Buck Jones
- Starring: Buck Jones; Phillip Trent; Edward Keane; Fred Kohler; Beth Marion; Frank McGlynn, Sr. Ben Corbett
- Cinematography: Herbert Kirkpatrick; Allen Q. Thompson
- Edited by: Bernard Loftus
- Production company: Universal Pictures
- Distributed by: Universal Pictures
- Release date: June 1, 1936
- Running time: 65 minutes
- Country: United States
- Language: English

For the Service is a 1936 American Western film directed by Buck Jones and written by Isadore Bernstein. The film stars Buck Jones, Phillip Trent, Edward Keane, Fred Kohler, Beth Marion, Frank McGlynn, Sr. and Ben Corbett. The film was released on June 1, 1936, by Universal Pictures.

== Plot ==
Buck leads a band of scouts under Captain Murphy, tasked with pursuing Morgan and his gang, who are attacking ranchers. The Captain's son joins the scouts but is revealed to be timid. Despite this, the Captain assigns them a mission to confront Morgan and his men.

== Cast ==
- Buck Jones as Buck O'Bryan
- Phillip Trent as George Murphy
- Edward Keane as Captain Murphy
- Fred Kohler as Bruce Howard
- Beth Marion as Penny Carson
- Frank McGlynn, Sr. as Jim
- Ben Corbett as Ben
- Chief Thunderbird as Chief Big Bear
- Robert McKenzie as Sherman
- Silver as Buck's Horse
