= Boss of Lonely Valley =

1937 film

- Theatrical release poster
- Directed by: Ray Taylor
- Screenplay by: Frances Guihan
- Story by: Forrest Brown
- Produced by: Buck Jones; Irving Starr
- Starring: Buck Jones; Richard Holland; Muriel Evans; Harvey Clark; Walter Miller; Lee Phelps
- Cinematography: John Hickson; Allen Q. Thompson
- Edited by: Bernard Loftus
- Production company: Universal Pictures
- Distributed by: Universal Pictures
- Release date: December 1, 1937
- Running time: 60 minutes
- Country: United States
- Language: English

Boss of Lonely Valley is a 1937 American Western film directed by Ray Taylor and written by Frances Guihan. The film stars Buck Jones, Richard Holland, Muriel Evans, Harvey Clark, Walter Miller and Lee Phelps. The film was released on December 1, 1937, by Universal Pictures.

== Cast ==
- Buck Jones as Steve Hanson
- Richard Holland as Sonny Lowery
- Muriel Evans as Retta Lowrey
- Harvey Clark as Jim Lynch
- Walter Miller as Jake Wagner
- Lee Phelps as Peter Starr
- Matty Fain as Sam Leavitt
- Grace Goodall as Aunt Martha Wiggins
- Ezra Paulette as Suds Maloney
- Virginia Dabney as Blondie
- Ted Adams as Henchman Slim
- Joe Bishop as Singing Cowhand
- Silver as Silver
