= Mabel Colcord =

American actress (1873–1952)

- Born: August 13, 1873; San Francisco, California, United States
- Died: June 6, 1952 (aged 78); Los Angeles, California, United States
- Occupation: Actress

Mabel Colcord was an American actress who was born in San Francisco on August 13, 1873. She acted in over 30 films throughout her career, and is best known for her roles in Little Women (1933), David Copperfield (1935), and The Great O'Malley (1937). Active mostly in the 1930s, she mostly played minor or uncredited roles as older women such as aunts, cooks, maids and neighbors. Colcord died on June 6, 1952, in Los Angeles at the age of 78.

== Partial filmography ==
- Little Women (1933) as Hannah
- Sadie McKee (1934) as Brennan's Cook (uncredited)
- David Copperfield (1935) as Mary Ann
- Vanessa: Her Love Story (1935) as Meinie, Judith's Maid (uncredited)
- No More Ladies (1935) as Marcia's Cook (uncredited)
- The Irish in Us (1935) as Mrs. Adams, O'Hara's Neighbor (uncredited)
- Diamond Jim (1935) as Brady's Aunt (uncredited)
- Shipmates Forever (1935) as Cowboy's Mother (uncredited)
- Miss Pacific Fleet (1935) as Kewpie's Landlady (uncredited)
- Lady of Secrets (1936) as Scrub Woman (uncredited)
- Sudden Bill Dorn (1936)
- The Old School Tie (1936)
- The Story of Louis Pasteur (1936) as A Lady (uncredited)
- The Law in Her Hands (1936) as 'Fishcake' Fanny (uncredited)
- We Went to College (1936) as Faculty Club Member (uncredited)
- Public Enemy's Wife (1936) as Old Woman at Train (uncredited)
- Three Married Men (1936) as Mrs. Mullins
- Camille (1936) as Madame Barjon (uncredited)
- Stella Dallas (1937)
- Girl Overboard (1937) as Elderly Woman (uncredited)
- The Great O'Malley (1937) as Mrs. Flaherty
- Let Them Live (1937) as Nurse (uncredited)
- Smoke Tree Range (1937) as Ma Kelly
- Blonde Trouble (1937) as Landlady (uncredited)
- The Firefly (1937) as Vendor (uncredited)
- Sudden Bill Dorn (1937) as Maggie
- Out West with the Hardys (1938)
- Holiday (1938) as Setons' Cook (uncredited)
- The Mysterious Rider (1938) as Old Lady on Stagecoach (uncredited)
- The Lady Objects (1938) as Martha (uncredited)
- The Cowboy and the Lady (1938) as Old Woman (uncredited)
- The Women (1939) as Woman Getting Massage (uncredited)
- The Shop Around the Corner (1940) as Aunt Anna (uncredited)
- Alias the Deacon (1940) as Lady with Ear Trumpet (uncredited)
- The Invisible Agent (1942) as Gretl, the Maid (uncredited)
- Keeper of the Flame (1942) as Store Proprietess (uncredited)
- The Miracle of the Bells (1948) as Parishioner Witnessing Miracle (uncredited) (final film role)
