= The Sisters (1914 film) =

1914 film

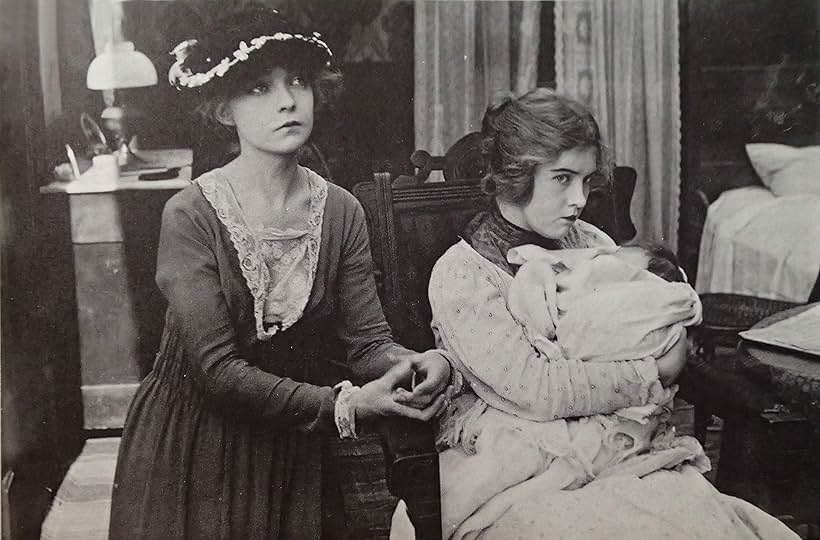
- Film still
- Directed by: Christy Cabanne
- Written by: Christy Cabanne; Anita Loos
- Starring: Lillian Gish
- Distributed by: Mutual Film
- Release date: November 29, 1914
- Running time: 20 minutes
- Country: United States
- Language: Silent with English intertitles

The Sisters is a 1914 American short drama film directed by Christy Cabanne.

== Plot summary ==
The plot revolves around two sisters, May and Carol, who reside in a small town. May, the elder sister, is regarded as more physically attractive than Carol. Despite this, Carol captures the attention of Frank, a country boy. However, when George, a city dweller, arrives in town for a visit, he becomes enamored with Carol and successfully wins her heart over Frank, leaving the latter in distress. On one of his visits to Carol, George encounters May and is instantly smitten with her.

== Cast ==
- Lillian Gish as May
- Dorothy Gish as Carol (May's younger sister)
- Elmer Clifton as Frank (Carol's country lover)
- W. E. Lawrence as George (from the city)
- Donald Crisp
- Josephine Crowell
