= Law for Tombstone =

1937 film

- Theatrical release poster
- Directed by: Buck Jones; W.B. Eason
- Screenplay by: Frances Guihan
- Story by: Charles Morris Martin
- Produced by: Buck Jones
- Starring: Buck Jones; Muriel Evans; Harvey Clark; Carl Stockdale; Earle Hodgins; Alexander Cross
- Cinematography: John Hickson; Allen Q. Thompson
- Edited by: Bernard Loftus
- Production company: Universal Pictures
- Distributed by: Universal Pictures
- Release date: October 10, 1937
- Running time: 59 minutes
- Country: United States
- Language: English

Law for Tombstone is a 1937 American Western film directed by Buck Jones and W.B. Eason and written by Frances Guihan. The film stars Buck Jones, Muriel Evans, Harvey Clark, Carl Stockdale, Earle Hodgins and Alexander Cross. The film was released on October 10, 1937, by Universal Pictures.

== Cast ==
- Buck Jones as Alamo Bowie
- Muriel Evans as Nellie Gray
- Harvey Clark as Doc Holliday
- Carl Stockdale as Judge Hart
- Earle Hodgins as Jack Dunn
- Alexander Cross as Bull Clanton
- Chuck Morrison as Henchman Smith
- Mary Carney as Marie Bowdray
- Charles Le Moyne as Sheriff Blane
- Ben Corbett as Henchman Slim
- Harold Hodge as Tom Scudder
- Arthur Van Slyke as Pop
- Ezra Paulette as Ranger Bob
- Francis Walker as Lee
- Silver as Silver
