= Westbound Stage =

- Theatrical release poster
- Directed by: Spencer Gordon Bennet
- Screenplay by: Robert Emmett Tansey
- Story by: John Foster
- Produced by: Edward Finney
- Starring: Tex Ritter; Nelson McDowell; Muriel Evans; Nolan Willis; Steve Clark; Tom London
- Cinematography: Marcel Le Picard
- Edited by: Fred Bain
- Music by: Frank Sanucci
- Production company: Monogram Pictures
- Distributed by: Monogram Pictures
- Release date: December 15, 1939
- Running time: 57 minutes
- Country: United States
- Language: English

Westbound Stage is a 1939 American Western film directed by Spencer Gordon Bennet and written by Robert Emmett Tansey. The film stars Tex Ritter, Nelson McDowell, Muriel Evans, Nolan Willis, Steve Clark and Tom London. The film was released on December 15, 1939, by Monogram Pictures.

== Cast ==
- Tex Ritter as Tex Wallace
- Nelson McDowell as Sandy
- Muriel Evans as Joan Hale
- Nolan Willis as Bart Lane
- Steve Clark as Butch
- Tom London as Parker
- Reed Howes as Red Greer
- Frank Ellis as Spider
- Chick Hannan as Clip
- Kenne Duncan as Capt. Jim Wallace
- Frank LaRue as Colonel Hale
- Phil Dunham as Jefferson Wells
- Hank Bell as Tim
- Chester Gan as Charlie
- Edward Cecil as Jim Blake
- Vance Rush as Sgt. Toby
- Wally West as Orderly
