= When a Man Sees Red (1934 film) =

1934 film by Alan James

- Theatrical release poster
- Directed by: Alan James
- Screenplay by: Alan James
- Story by: Basil Dickey
- Produced by: Buck Jones; Irving Starr
- Starring: Buck Jones; Peggy Campbell; Dorothy Revier; LeRoy Mason; Syd Saylor; Frank LaRue
- Cinematography: Ted D. McCord
- Edited by: Bernard Loftus
- Production company: Universal Pictures
- Distributed by: Universal Pictures
- Release date: November 24, 1934
- Running time: 60 minutes
- Country: United States
- Language: English

When a Man Sees Red is a 1934 American Western film written and directed by Alan James and starring Buck Jones, Peggy Campbell, Dorothy Revier, LeRoy Mason, Syd Saylor and Frank LaRue. It was released on November 24, 1934, by Universal Pictures.

== Cast ==
- Buck Jones as Buck Benson
- Peggy Campbell as Mary Lawrence
- Dorothy Revier as Barbara Gordon
- LeRoy Mason as Dick Brady
- Syd Saylor as Ben
- Frank LaRue as Radcliffe
- Libby Taylor as Mandy
- Charles K. French as Padre
- Jack Rockwell as Sheriff Carlson
- Bob Kortman as Henchman Spook
- William Steele as Henchman Speck
