= Stone of Silver Creek =

1935 film by Nick Grinde

- Theatrical release poster
- Directed by: Nick Grinde
- Screenplay by: Earle Snell
- Story by: R.R. Harris
- Produced by: Buck Jones; Irving Starr
- Starring: Buck Jones; Noel Francis; Niles Welch; Marion Shilling; Peggy Campbell; Murdock MacQuarrie
- Cinematography: Ted D. McCord; Joe Novak
- Edited by: Bernard Loftus
- Music by: Charles Rosoff; Oliver Wallace; Lee Zahler
- Production company: Universal Pictures
- Distributed by: Universal Pictures
- Release date: April 15, 1935
- Running time: 63 minutes
- Country: United States
- Language: English

Stone of Silver Creek is a 1935 American Western film directed by Nick Grinde, written by Earle Snell, and starring Buck Jones, Noel Francis, Niles Welch, Marion Shilling, Peggy Campbell and Murdock MacQuarrie. It was released on April 15, 1935, by Universal Pictures.

== Cast ==
- Buck Jones as T. William Stone
- Noel Francis as Lola
- Niles Welch as Rev. Timothy Tucker
- Marion Shilling as Martha Mason
- Peggy Campbell as Nancy Raymond
- Murdock MacQuarrie as George J. Mason
- Rodney Hildebrand as Fred Graves
- Harry Semels as R. J. Simmons
- Grady Sutton as Jimmy
- Kernan Cripps as Ben
- Frank Rice as Tom Lucas
