= Border Brigands =

1935 film by Nick Grinde

- Theatrical release poster
- Directed by: Nick Grinde
- Screenplay by: Stuart Anthony
- Story by: Stuart Anthony
- Produced by: Buck Jones; Irving Starr
- Starring: Buck Jones; Lona Andre; Fred Kohler; Frank Rice; Hank Bell; Edward Keane
- Cinematography: William A. Sickner; Allen Q. Thompson
- Edited by: Bernard Loftus
- Production company: Universal Pictures
- Distributed by: Universal Pictures
- Release date: June 1, 1935
- Running time: 56 minutes
- Country: United States
- Language: English

Border Brigands is a 1935 American Western film directed by Nick Grinde and written by Stuart Anthony. The film stars Buck Jones, Lona Andre, Fred Kohler, Frank Rice, Hank Bell and Edward Keane. The film was released on June 1, 1935, by Universal Pictures.

== Cast ==
- Buck Jones as Sergeant Buck Barry
- Lona Andre as Diane
- Fred Kohler as Captain Conyda
- Frank Rice as Rocky O'Leary
- Hank Bell as Henchman Sisk
- Edward Keane as Inspector Jim Barry
- J. P. McGowan as Inspector Winston
- Gertrude Astor as Big Six
- Silver as Buck's Horse
