= Ride 'Em Cowboy (1936 film) =

1936 film directed by Lesley Selander

- Theatrical release poster
- Directed by: Lesley Selander
- Screenplay by: Frances Guihan
- Story by: Buck Jones
- Produced by: Buck Jones; Irving Star
- Starring: Buck Jones; Luana Walters; Donald Kirke; George Cooper; J. P. McGowan; Joseph W. Girard
- Cinematography: Herbert Kirkpatrick; Allen Q. Thompson
- Edited by: Bernard Loftus
- Production company: Universal Pictures
- Distributed by: Universal Pictures
- Release date: September 20, 1936
- Running time: 60 minutes
- Country: United States
- Language: English

Ride 'Em Cowboy is a 1936 American Western film directed by Lesley Selander and written by Frances Guihan. The film stars Buck Jones, Luana Walters, Donald Kirke, George Cooper, J. P. McGowan and Joseph W. Girard. The film was released on September 20, 1936, by Universal Pictures.

== Cast ==
- Buck Jones as Jess Burns
- Luana Walters as Lillian Howard
- Donald Kirke as Sam Parker Jr.
- George Cooper as Chuck Morse
- J. P. McGowan as Jim Howard
- Joseph W. Girard as Sam Parker
- Charles Le Moyne as Sheriff Stanton
- W. E. Lawrence as Sandy Adams
- Silver as Silver
