= The Witness Vanishes =

1939 American film directed by Otis Garrett

- Poster for the film
- Directed by: Otis Garrett
- Written by: Robertson White
- Produced by: Irving Starr
- Starring: Edmund Lowe; Wendy Barrie; Bruce Lester
- Cinematography: Arthur Martinelli
- Edited by: Harry Keller
- Production company: Crime Club Productions
- Distributed by: Universal Pictures
- Release date: September 22, 1939
- Running time: 66 minutes
- Country: United States
- Language: English

The Witness Vanishes is a 1939 American mystery film directed by Otis Garrett and starring Edmund Lowe, Wendy Barrie, and Bruce Lester.

== Cast ==
- Edmund Lowe as Mark Peters
- Wendy Barrie as Joan Marplay
- Bruce Lester as Lord Noel Stretton
- Forrester Harvey as Alistair Mac Nab
- Walter Kingsford as Ambrose Craven
- J. M. Kerrigan as Flinters
- Barlowe Borland as Lucius Marplay
- Boyd Irwin as Sinclair Ellis
- Vernon Steele as Nigel Partridge
- Reginald Barlow as Sir John Digby

== Production ==
In 1937, Universal Pictures made a deal with Crime Club, who were publishers of whodunnits. Over the next few years Universal released several mystery films in the series. The Witness Vanishes was the last film in the series.The film was inspired by James Ronald's magazine serial They Can't Hang Me! which was the films working title.

== Release ==
The Witness Vanishes was released by Universal Pictures on September 22, 1939.
