= W. E. Lawrence =

American actor (1896–1947)

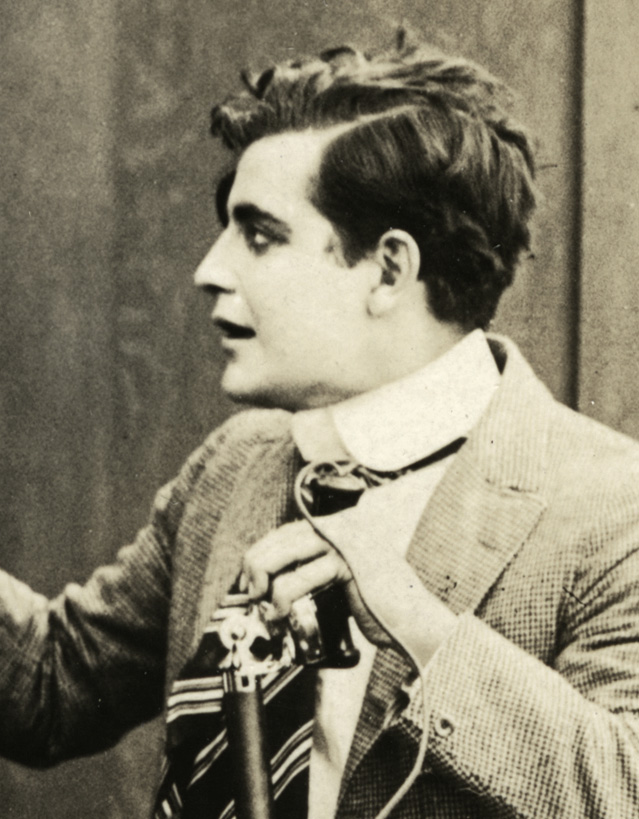
- Lawrence in Above Par (1915)
- Born: August 22, 1896; Brooklyn, New York, U.S.
- Died: November 28, 1947 (aged 51); Los Angeles, California, U.S.
- Occupation: Actor
- Years active: 1912–1947

William Effingham Lawrence (August 22, 1896 – November 28, 1947) was an American actor of the silent era. He was born in Brooklyn, New York and died in Los Angeles, California. Known by the nickname "Babe", Lawrence appeared in 120 films between 1912 and 1947. Before entering the movie industry, he was an artist's model. His work in that field included being an Arrow Collar Man.

== Partial filmography ==
- The Painted Lady (1912)
- The Battle of the Sexes (1914)
- The Life of General Villa (1914)
- The Folly of Anne (1914)
- The Sisters (1914)
- The Slave Girl (1915)
- The Outlaw's Revenge (1915)
- Up from the Depths (1915)
- Daphne and the Pirate (1916)
- The Flying Torpedo (1916)
- Flirting with Fate (1916)
- Intolerance (1916)
- The Old Folks at Home (1916)
- Pathways of Life (1916)
- The Slacker (1917)
- Mile-a-Minute Kendall (1918)
- Hands Up! (1918)
- A Japanese Nightingale (1918)
- The Narrow Path (1918)
- Common Clay (1919)
- Bride 13 (1920)
- The Snob (1921)
- Habit (1921)
- Ducks and Drakes (1921)
- Get Your Man (1921)
- The Kiss (1921)
- Fightin' Mad (1921)
- Morals (1921)
- They Like 'Em Rough (1922)
- Forget Me Not (1922)
- Blood and Sand (1922)
- The Love Gambler (1922)
- A Front Page Story (1922)
- Blinky (1923)
- Cameo Kirby (1923)
- The Thrill Chaser (1923)
- The Whispered Name (1924)
- The Law Forbids (1924)
- The Reckless Age (1924)
- A Man Four-Square (1926)
- Hard Boiled (1926)
- The Costello Case (1930)
- Best of Enemies (1933)
- Sunset of Power (1936)
- Silver Spurs (1936)
- Ride 'Em Cowboy (1936)
- Empty Saddles (1936)
- The Boss Rider of Gun Creek (1936)
- Left-Handed Law (1937)
- Black Aces (1937)
- Dead Reckoning (1947)
