= The Last Warning (1938 film) =

- Theatrical release poster
- Directed by: Albert S. Rogell
- Screenplay by: Edmund Hartmann
- Based on: The Dead Don't Care by Jonathan Latimer
- Produced by: Irving Starr
- Starring: Preston Foster; Frank Jenks; Kay Linaker; E. E. Clive; Joyce Compton; Frances Robinson
- Cinematography: George Meehan
- Edited by: Maurice Wright
- Production companies: Crime Club Productions, Inc.
- Distributed by: Universal Pictures
- Release date: January 6, 1939 (United States)
- Running time: 62 minutes
- Country: United States
- Language: English

The Last Warning is a 1938 American mystery film directed by Albert S. Rogell and written by Edmund Hartmann. It is based on the 1938 novel The Dead Don't Care by Jonathan Latimer. The film stars Preston Foster, Frank Jenks, Kay Linaker, E. E. Clive, Joyce Compton and Frances Robinson. The film was released on January 6, 1939, by Universal Pictures.

== Plot ==
Detective Bill Crane and his sidekick Doc Williams are hired by John Essex who has been receiving threatening letters. They are sent to his uncle's country estate to investigate and soon his sister Linda is kidnapped.

== Cast ==
- Preston Foster as Bill Crane
- Frank Jenks as Doc Williams
- Kay Linaker as Carla Rodriguez
- E. E. Clive as Major Barclay
- Joyce Compton as Dawn Day
- Frances Robinson as Linda Essex
- Raymond Parker as John Essex
- Robert Paige as Tony Henderson
- Albert Dekker as Higgs
- Roland Drew as Paul Gomez
- Crane Whitley as Slocumbe
- Orville Caldwell as Wilson
- Richard Lane as Steve Felson

== Production ==
In 1937, Universal Pictures made a deal with the Crime Club, who published whodunnits. Over the next few years, Universal released several mystery films in the series. The Last Warning was part of the series, and the last to feature the sleuthing team of Crane and Doc.
