= The Boss Rider of Gun Creek =

1936 American Western film

- Theatrical release poster
- Directed by: Lesley Selander
- Screenplay by: Frances Guihan
- Story by: E.B. Mann
- Produced by: Buck Jones
- Starring: Buck Jones; Muriel Evans; Harvey Clark; Alphonse Ethier; Tom Chatterton; Josef Swickard
- Cinematography: Herbert Kirkpatrick; Allen Q. Thompson
- Edited by: Bernard Loftus
- Production company: Universal Pictures
- Distributed by: Universal Pictures
- Release date: December 1, 1936
- Running time: 60 minutes
- Country: United States
- Language: English

The Boss Rider of Gun Creek is a 1936 American Western film directed by Lesley Selander and written by Frances Guihan. The film stars are Buck Jones, Muriel Evans, Harvey Clark, Alphonse Ethier, Tom Chatterton, and Josef Swickard. The film was released on December 1, 1936, by Universal Pictures.

== Cast ==
- Buck Jones as Larry Day / Gary Elliott
- Muriel Evans as Starr Landerson
- Harvey Clark as Pop Greer
- Alphonse Ethier as Doc. Northrup
- Tom Chatterton as Sheriff Blaine
- Josef Swickard as Lafe Turner
- Ernest Hilliard as Banker Ed Randall
- Edward Keane as Lawyer
- Mahlon Hamilton as Red Vale
- Lee Phelps as Sheriff Lem Morrison
- Allan Sears as Henchman Slim
- W. E. Lawrence as Henchman Blackie
- Guy Edward Hearn as Mal MacGregor
- Silver as Larry's Horse
