= The Call of the Savage =

- Directed by: Lew Landers
- Written by: Basil Dickey; Nate Gatzert; George H. Plympton
- Produced by: Milton Gatzert; Henry MacRae
- Starring: Noah Beery Jr. Dorothy Short; Harry Woods; Bryant Washburn
- Cinematography: William A. Sickner; Richard Fryer
- Edited by: Irving Applebaum; Saul A. Goodkind; Alvin Todd; Edward Todd
- Distributed by: Universal Pictures
- Release date: 1935
- Running time: 12 chapters (231 min)
- Country: United States
- Language: English

The Call of the Savage (1935) is a Universal film serial based on the story Jan of the Jungle by Otis Adelbert Kline. It was directed by Lew Landers and released by Universal Pictures.

== Plot ==
Two teams of scientists scour the dark jungles of Africa to find a secret formula.

=== Chapter titles ===
1. Shipwrecked
2. Captured by Cannibals
3. Stampeding Death
4. Terrors of the Jungle
5. The Plunge of Peril
6. Thundering Waters
7. The Hidden Monster
8. Jungle Treachery
9. The Avenging Fire God
10. Descending Doom
11. The Dragon Strikes
12. The Pit of Flame

== Cast ==
- Noah Beery Jr. as Jan Trevor
- Dorothy Short as Mona Andreas
- Harry Woods as Borno
- Bryant Washburn as Dr. Harry Trevor
- Walter Meller as Dr. Frank Bracken
- Fred MacKaye as Dr. Charles Phillips
- John Davidson as Prince Samu
- J. Frank Glendon as Speaker at conference
- William Desmond as Allen
- Grace Cunard as Mrs. Camerford Amster
- Viva Tattersall as Georgia Trevor

== Production ==
Call of the Savage features "Jan, the Jungle Boy" and was based on "Jan of the Jungle" by Otis Adelbert Kline, a successful pulp story which rivalled the Tarzan series.

In 1956 material from this serial was edited into a 70-minute film called Savage Fury.

== See also ==
- List of American films of 1935
- List of film serials by year
- List of film serials by studio

Preceded by Rustlers of Red Dog (1935)	Universal Serial; The Call of the Savage (1935)	Succeeded by The Roaring West (1935)
