= Missing Girls =

1936 film by Phil Rosen

- Directed by: Phil Rosen
- Written by: John W. Krafft (screenplay); Martin Mooney (story "When Girls Leave Home")
- Produced by: George R. Batcheller (producer)
- Starring: Roger Pryor; Muriel Evans; Sidney Blackmer
- Cinematography: M.A. Anderson
- Edited by: Roland D. Reed
- Production company: Chesterfield Pictures
- Distributed by: Chesterfield Pictures
- Release date: September 10, 1936
- Running time: 66 minutes
- Country: United States
- Language: English

Missing Girls is a 1936 American crime drama film directed by Phil Rosen and starring Roger Pryor, Muriel Evans and Sidney Blackmer. It was produced and distributed by Chesterfield Pictures.

== Cast ==
- Roger Pryor as Reporter Jimmie Dugan
- Muriel Evans as Dorothy Benson
- Sidney Blackmer as Dan Collins
- Noel Madison as Ben Davis
- Ann Doran as Ann Jason
- George Cooper as Zig
- Dewey Robinson as Harry Wilson
- Wallis Clark as Senator Benson
- Vera Lewis as Ma Barton
- Warner Richmond as Ray Hanson
- Ben Carter as Pokey
- Don Brodie as Chuck Martin
