= The Black Doll =

1938 film by Otis Garrett

- Directed by: Otis Garrett
- Screenplay by: Harold Buckley
- Based on: The Black Doll by William Edward Hayes
- Produced by: Irving Starr
- Starring: Donald Woods; Nan Grey; Edgar Kennedy; C. Henry Gordon
- Cinematography: Stanley Cortez; Ira Morgan
- Edited by: Maurice Wright
- Production companies: Crime Club Productions, Inc.
- Distributed by: Universal Pictures Co.
- Release date: 30 January 1938
- Running time: 66 minutes
- Country: United States

The Black Doll is a 1938 American horror mystery film directed by Otis Garrett and starring Donald Woods and Edgar Kennedy. The film was the second in Universal's Crime Club series following The Westland Case.

== Production ==
In 1937, Universal Pictures made a deal with Crime Club, who were publishers of whodunnits. Over the next few years Universal released several mystery films in the series. The film was the second in Universal's Crime Club series following The Westland Case. The Black Doll was based on the novel The Black Doll by William Edward Hayes.

== Release ==
The Black Doll was distributed by Universal Pictures on January 30, 1938. The film was followed with eight more films in the Crime Club series in the next two years.

== Reception ==
From contemporary reviews, Wanda Hale of The New York Daily News described the film as "an absorbing mystery story" that will "stir your admiration, wrack your nerves, tickle your funny bone and, if you don't watch out, deflate your pride in your sleuthing ability." The Film Daily declared the film as "a combination of suspenseful mystery and comedy that furnishes a lot of laughs makes this an enjoyable murder picture of the regular program variety." The Hollywood Reporter found that the Crime Club series "cannot make up its mind whether to be a mystery or a farce. Harold Buckley's screenplay is excellent, but it is difficult to understand how the presence of low comedy, which borders on actual farce, can be justified by a director in a picture dealing with murder."
