= Gambling Ship (1938 film) =

1938 crime film directed by Aubrey Scotto

- Directed by: Aubrey Scotto
- Screenplay by: Alex Gottlieb
- Story by: George Carleton Brown; Emanuel Manheim
- Produced by: Irving Starr
- Starring: Robert Wilcox; Helen Mack; Edward Brophy; Irving Pichel
- Cinematography: George Meehan
- Edited by: Edward Curtiss
- Production companies: Crime Club Productions, Inc.
- Distributed by: Universal Pictures Co.
- Release date: December 16, 1938
- Country: United States

Gambling Ship is a 1938 American mystery film directed by Aubrey Scotto and written by Alex Gottlieb. The film stars Robert Wilcox, Helen Mack, Edward Brophy, Irving Pichel, Joe Sawyer and Selmer Jackson. The film was released on December 16, 1938, by Universal Pictures.

== Plot ==
A gambler helps a debt-ridden orphanage that was started by his late wife.

== Cast ==
- Robert Wilcox as Larry Mitchell
- Helen Mack as Mollie Riley
- Edward Brophy as Cuthbert Innocent
- Irving Pichel as Professor
- Joe Sawyer as Tony Garzoni
- Selmer Jackson as Steve Riley
- Sam McDaniel as Speedy
- Dorothy Vaughan as Matron
- Al Hill as Larry the Finger
- John Harmon as Cramer
- Rudolph Chavers as Snowflake
- Tim Davis as Nick

== Production ==
Production began on the film in early November 1938. The film was part of the Crime Club mystery series. 11 films were made in the series between 1937 and 1939.

== Release ==
Gambling Ship was distributed by Universal Pictures Company, Inc. on December 16, 1938.

== Reception ==
From contemporary reviews, a reviewer in Variety described the film as a "dawdling cheapie with a light cast which topples to the status of a 'C' programmer."
