= Empty Saddles =

1936 film by Lesley Selander

- Directed by: Lesley Selander
- Screenplay by: Frances Guihan
- Story by: Cherry Wilson
- Produced by: Buck Jones; Irving Starr
- Starring: See below
- Cinematography: Herbert Kirkpatrick; Allen Q. Thompson
- Edited by: Bernard Loftus
- Music by: Felix Mills
- Production company: Universal Pictures
- Distributed by: Universal Pictures
- Release date: December 20, 1936 (United States)
- Running time: 67 minutes
- Country: United States
- Language: English

Empty Saddles is a 1936 American Western film directed by Lesley Selander. It is a Buck Jones B Western. (Empty Saddles is also the title of a 1962 Burt Arthur mystery novel.)

== Cast ==
- Buck Jones as Buck Devlin
- Louise Brooks as 'Boots' Boone
- Harvey Clark as 'Swaps' Boone
- Charles B. Middleton as Cimarron 'Cim' White
- Lloyd Ingraham as Lem Jessup, alias Jim Grant
- Frank Campeau as Kit Kress
- Earl Askam as Henchman Red Madden
- Ben Corbett as Vegas, head drover
- Niles Welch as Jasper Kade
- Gertrude Astor as Eloise Hayes
- Claire Rochelle as Madge Grant
- Charles Le Moyne as Mace
- W. E. Lawrence as Cull Cole
