= Frances Guihan =

American screenwriter

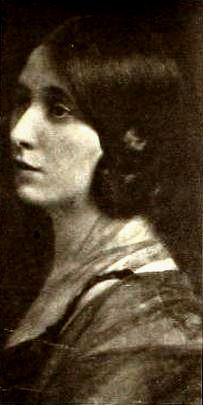
- American screenwriter Frances Guihan (1890 – 1951), on page 4022 of the May 8, 1920 Motion Picture News. The caption notes that she has been writing scenarios for Pathé films.
- Born: Frances Elizabeth Guihan; September 22, 1890; East St. Louis, Illinois, USA
- Died: December 21, 1951 (aged 61); Los Angeles, California, USA
- Occupation: Screenwriter
- Years active: 1916–1938 (film)
- Spouse: Ivan Kahn (div.)

Frances Guihan (September 22, 1890 – December 21, 1951) was an American screenwriter. She worked on more than 40 films during her career, including a number of B westerns.

== Biography ==
=== Beginnings ===
Frances was born in East St. Louis, Illinois, the youngest daughter of Dennis Guihan and Catherine Fagan. She began her career working in a St. Louis office for $12 a week, writing scenarios at night (most of which were rejected).

=== Hollywood career ===
Her scenarios eventually attracted notice from people in high places, and soon she was in Hollywood commanding $70,000 a year. In those early years, she was known for writing (and, in one case, directing) scenarios for Japanese actor Sessue Hayakawa. She then transitioned into writing for actress and producer Ruth Roland. Over the course of her career, she also wrote at Balboa, Metro, and Haworth. She'd later work extensively on the Buck Jones Westerns.

=== Personal life ===
In 1919, she married Ivan Kahn, an actor, businessman, scenario writer, and amateur boxer. The pair met while Kahn started writing comedies for Pathe and Kalem. After they divorced, she'd remarry.

She also owned an anti-gray hair tonic company she purchased from a friend. "You'd be surprised how many stars use the stuff," she'd later tell a reporter (although she declined to name names).

== Selected filmography ==
- A Heart in Pawn (1919)
- The Courageous Coward (1919)
- I Have Killed (1924)
- The Cancelled Debt (1927)
- She's My Baby (1927)
- Thumbs Down (1927)
- Closed Gates (1927)
- In the First Degree (1927)
- Face Value (1927)
- Stranded (1927)
- Marry the Girl (1928)
- A Million for Love (1928)
- Burning Up Broadway (1928)
- Bachelor's Paradise (1928)
- Midstream (1929)
- Cock o' the Walk (1930)
- Bulldog Courage (1935)
- Empty Saddles (1936)
- The Boss Rider of Gun Creek (1936)
- The Cowboy Star (1936)
- Westbound Mail (1937)
- Law for Tombstone (1937)
- Frontier Scout (1938)

== Bibliography ==
- Pitts, Michael R. Western Movies: A Guide to 5,105 Feature Films. McFarland, 2012.
