= Buck Jones =

American actor

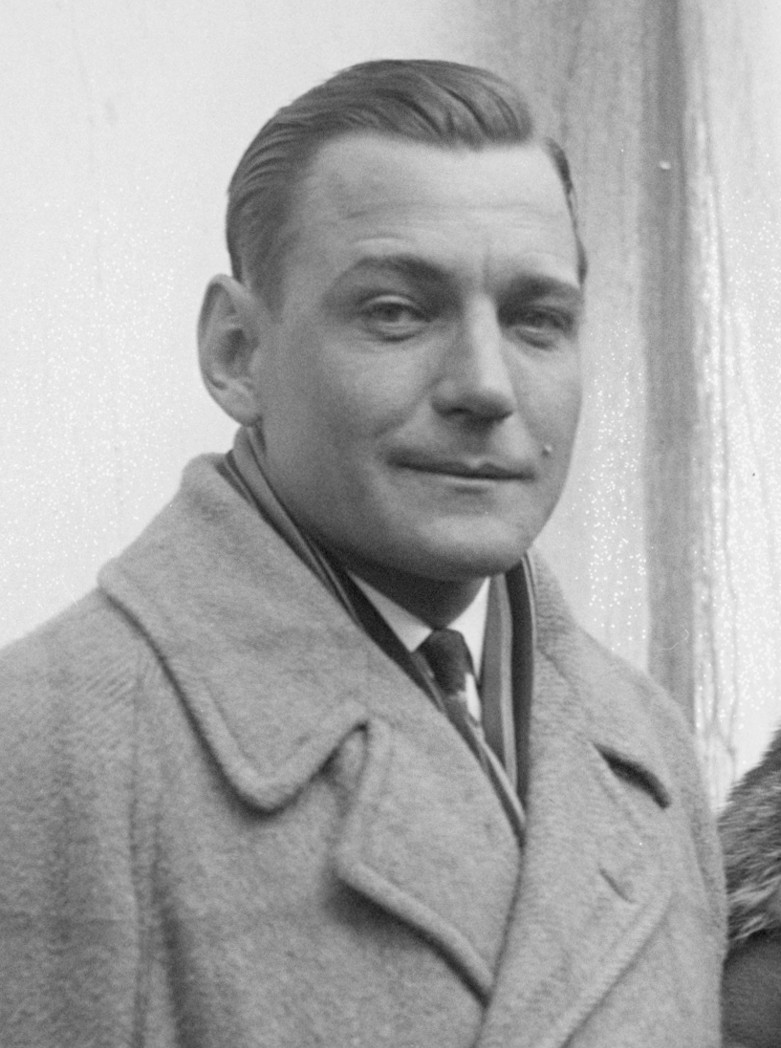
- Jones in 1926
- Born: Charles Frederick Gebhart; December 12, 1891; Vincennes, Indiana, U.S.
- Died: November 30, 1942 (aged 50); Boston, Massachusetts, U.S.
- Other name: Charles Jones
- Occupation: Actor
- Years active: 1914–1942
- Spouse: Odille Osborne (m. 1915)
- Children: 1

Buck Jones (born Charles Frederick Gebhart; December 12, 1891 – November 30, 1942) was an American actor, known for his work in many popular Western movies. In his early film appearances, he was credited as Charles Jones.

== Early life, military service ==
Jones was born Charles Frederick Gebhart on the outskirts of Vincennes, Indiana, on December 12, 1891—some sources indicate December 4, 1889, but his marriage license and military records confirm the 1891 date. In 1907 he joined the United States Army a month after his 16th birthday: his mother had signed a consent form that gave his age as 18. He was assigned to Troop G, 6th Cavalry Regiment, and was deployed to the Philippines in October 1907, where he served in combat and was wounded during the Moro Rebellion. Upon his return to the US in December 1909, he was honorably discharged at Fort McDowell, California.

Jones had an affection for race cars and the racing industry and became close friends with early driver Harry Stillman. Through his association with Stillman he began working extensively as a test driver for the Marmon Motor Car Company. Yet by October 1910 he had re-enlisted in the United States Army. Because he wanted to learn to fly, he requested a transfer to the Aeronautical Division, U.S. Signal Corps in 1913, without knowing that only an officer could become a pilot. He received his second honorable discharge from the Army in October 1913.

== Cowboy, stuntman, beginning of film career ==
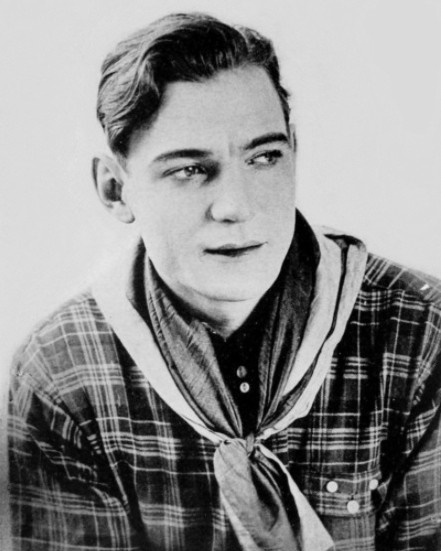
Buck Jones c. 1918

Following his military service he began working as a cowboy on the 101 Ranch near Bliss, Oklahoma. While attending equestrian shows he met Odille "Dell" Osborne, who rode horses professionally. The two became involved and married in 1915. Both had very little money, so the producers of a Wild West Show they were working on at the time offered to allow them to marry in an actual show performance, in public, which they accepted.

While in Los Angeles, and with his wife pregnant, Jones decided to leave the cowboy life behind and get a job in the film industry. He was hired by Universal Pictures for $5 per day as a bit player and stuntman. He later worked for Canyon Pictures, and then Fox Film Corporation, eventually earning $40 per week as a stuntman. With Fox his salary increased to $150 per week, and company owner William Fox decided to use him as a backup to Tom Mix. This led to his first starring role, The Last Straw, released in 1920.

== Stardom ==
In 1925 Jones made three films with a very young Carole Lombard. He had more than 160 film credits to his name by this time and had joined Hoot Gibson, Tom Mix, and Ken Maynard as the top cowboy actors of the day. By 1928 he formed his own production company, but his independently produced film The Big Hop (a non-Western) failed. He then organized a touring Wild West show, with himself as a featured attraction, but this expensive venture also failed due to the faltering economy of late 1929.

With the new talking pictures replacing silent films as a national pastime, Westerns fell out of favor—recording soundtracks outdoors was not yet perfected. The major studios weren't interested in hiring Buck Jones. In 1930 he signed with producer Sol Lesser to star in Westerns for $300 a week, a fraction of his top salary in the silent-film days. His voice—a rugged baritone—recorded well and the films were released by then-minor-league Columbia Pictures. They were very successful, re-establishing Buck Jones as a major movie name. During the 1930s he starred in Western features and serials for Columbia and Universal Pictures.

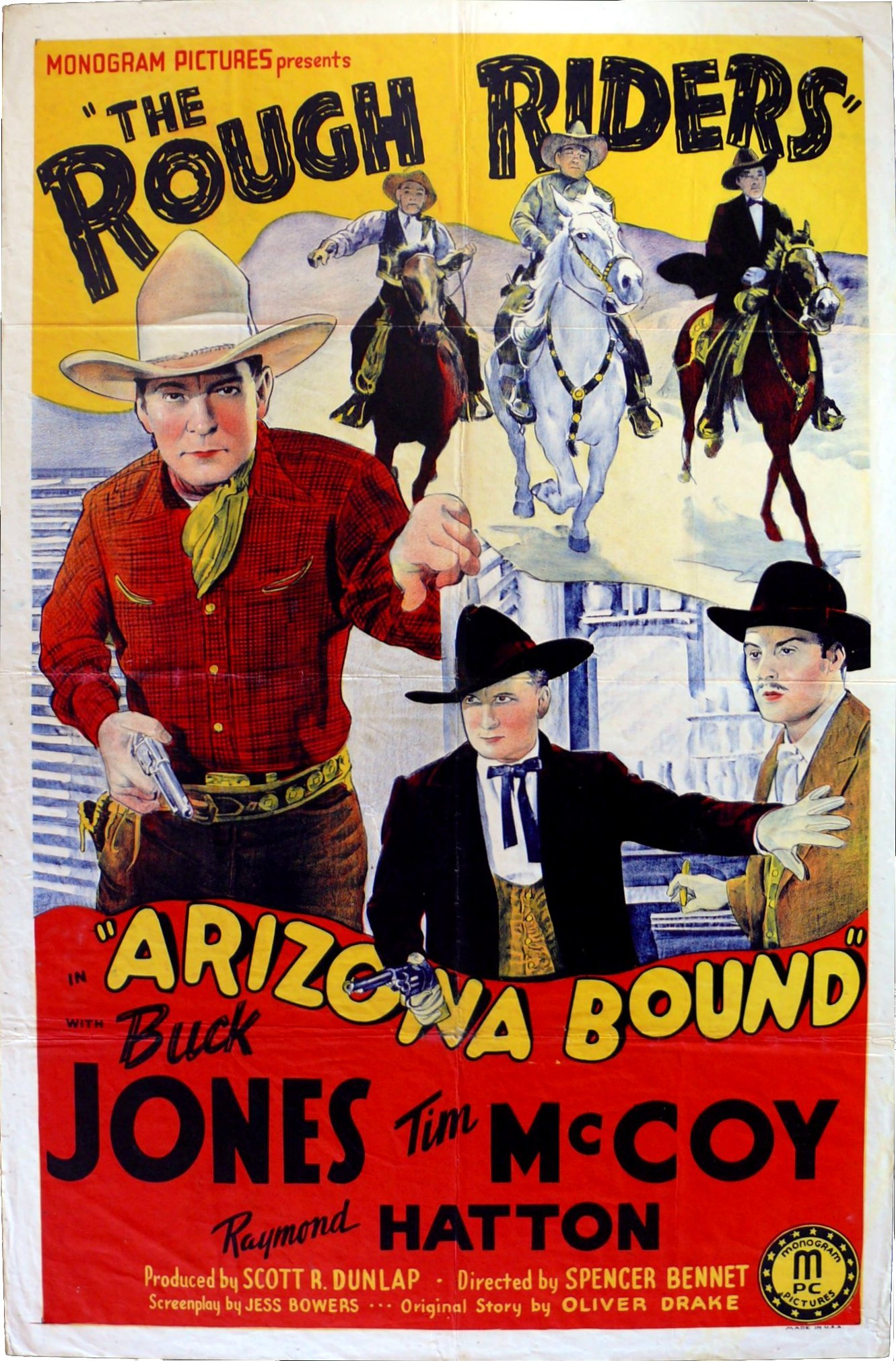
Jones on the poster for the Western Arizona Bound (1941)

His star waned in the late 1930s when singing cowboys became the rage and Jones, then in his late 40s, was uncomfortably cast in conventional leading-man roles. He rejoined Columbia in the fall of 1940, starring in the serial White Eagle (an expansion of his 1932 feature of the same name). The new serial was a hit and Jones was again re-established. His final series of Western features, co-produced by Jones and his manager Scott R. Dunlap of Monogram Pictures, featured The Rough Riders trio: Buck Jones, Tim McCoy, and Raymond Hatton.

== Radio ==
In 1937 Jones starred in Hoofbeats, a syndicated 15-minute radio program. The 39 episodes could be broadcast daily, weekly, or multiple times a week by individual radio stations. The stories were narrated by "the Old Wrangler" and told the adventures of Buck Jones and his horse Silver. The program was produced in the studios of Recordings, Inc., with Grape Nuts Flakes as sponsor.

== Merchandising ==
Buck Jones lent his name and likeness to various product endorsements, including Post Grape-Nuts Flakes (his radio sponsor), the pulp magazine Buck Jones Western Stories (November 1936 - September 1937) and Daisy Outdoor Products. His licensing also extended to the Big Little Book series, for example:

- Buck Jones and The Two Gun Kid (1937) – Big Little Book #1404. Author: Gaylord Du Bois.
- Buck Jones and The Night Riders (1937) – Big Big Book #4069. Author: Gaylord Du Bois. Artist: Hal Arbo.
- Buck Jones and The Rock Creek Cattle War (1938) – Big Little Book #1461. Author: Gaylord Du Bois.
- Buck Jones and The Killers of Crooked Butte (1940) – Better Little Book #1451. Author: Gaylord Du Bois

Jones was also a consultant for Daisy, which issued a Daisy "Buck Jones" model pump-action air rifle. Incorporating a compass and a "sundial" into the stock, it was one of Daisy's top-end air rifles and sold well for several years. There was some confusion decades later with the release of the film A Christmas Story, due to author Jean Shepherd's erroneous recollection that the Daisy Red Ryder BB Gun had a compass and sundial in the stock; the BB gun never had them except for the two specially made for the film.

== Death ==
Jones was one of the 492 victims of the Cocoanut Grove fire in Boston, Massachusetts, on November 28, 1942. Some news reports erroneously stated that Jones had escaped the flames, but had gone back into the nightclub to save others. This story was circulated widely; in a 1970 interview with Merv Griffin, John Wayne stated that Buck Jones was his hero, and that Jones did go back into the Cocoanut Grove fire to rescue additional victims.

It was really Jones's dinner companion and manager, Scott R. Dunlap of Monogram, who was taken out of the building and treated for his injuries. Jones himself was still trapped inside the nightclub, reported author John C. Esposito, and "was found clinging to life on the terrace where he had been seated all evening. If he had gotten out of the building safely and returned to save others, the likelihood of his falling in the precise spot where he had been seated is extraordinarily small... Those who didn't die on the spot reported afterward that they were immediately overcome by fumes, flames, or the panicked crowd." The details of Jones being rescued were related in Paul Benzaquin's 1959 account: "[Watson of the Coast Guard] spotted a body whose feet wore a pair of beautifully tooled leather cowboy boots... 'He's breathing. But he's hurt bad. My God, how he must have taken it!' They lifted the tall figure onto their litter and carried him out. At the curb was a police ambulance that already had one victim inside... A patrolman climbed in and the ambulance pulled away. Buck Jones was taking his last ride." He lingered for two days and then succumbed to his injuries on November 30, at age 50. The story of Jones's heroism was likely reported to the press by Jones's spokesman Dunlap, for publicity value.

== Family ==
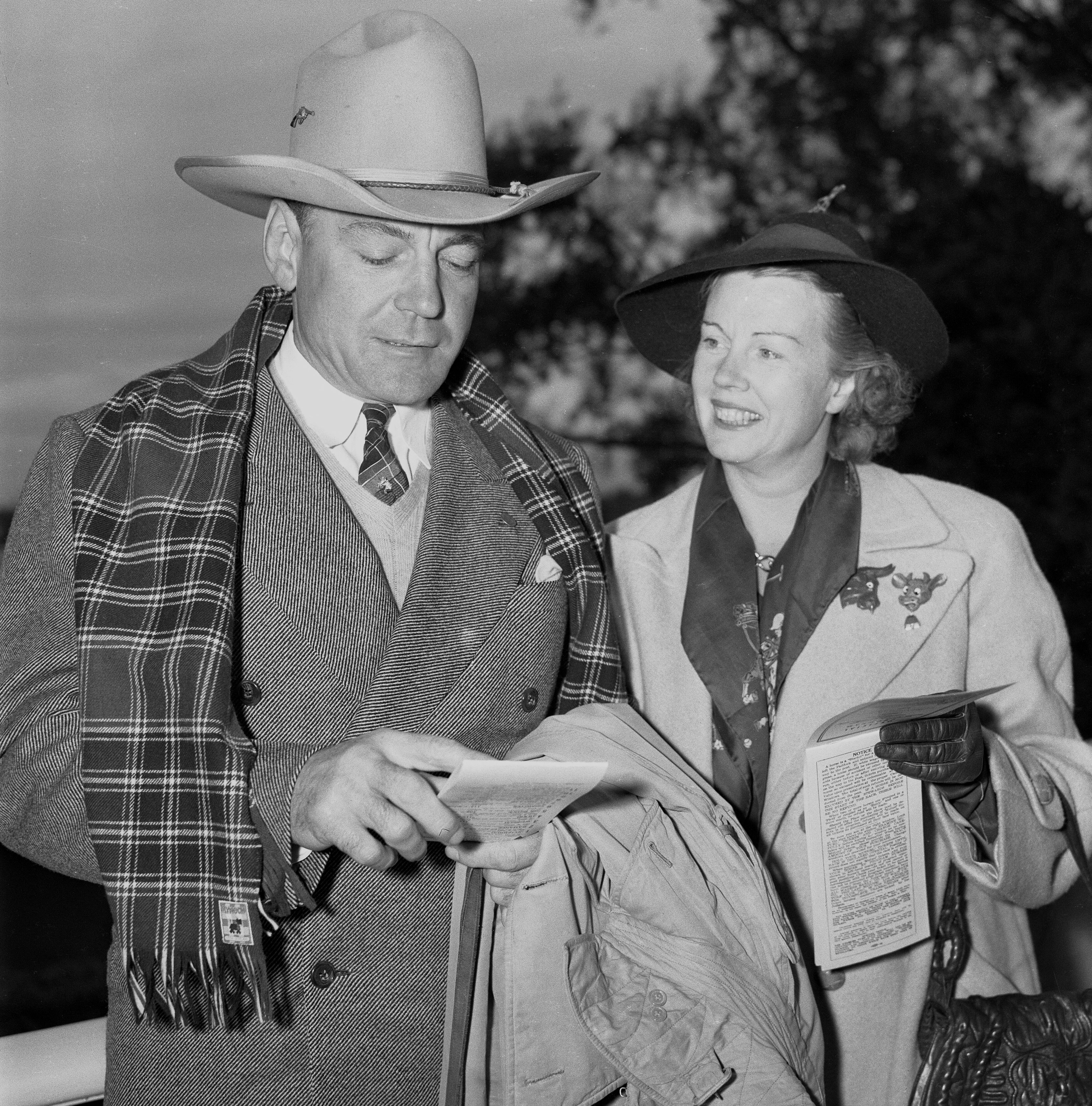
Jones with his wife, Odelle, in 1940

Buck Jones's daughter, Maxine Jones, was married to Noah Beery, Jr. from 1940 to 1966. After her divorce from Beery, she married Nicholas Firfires, a Cowboy Hall of Fame Western Artist, on August 11, 1969. Maxine and Nicholas never had any children but were married until her death in 1990.

== References in popular media ==
On his album When I Was a Kid, Bill Cosby performed a routine in which he described seeing Buck Jones movies as a child. He commented on some of the mannerisms displayed by Jones's characters, such as not drinking or smoking, and chewing gum to signal that he was getting angry.

== Recognition ==
In 1997, a Golden Palm Star on the Palm Springs, California, Walk of Stars was dedicated to him.

In 1960, Jones was honored with a star on the Hollywood Walk of Fame for his contributions to the motion picture industry. The star is located at 6834 Hollywood Blvd.

== Partial filmography ==
- Western Blood (1918)
- The Rainbow Trail (1918)
- The Speed Maniac (1919)
- The Coming of the Law (1919)
- The Feud (1919)
- The Cyclone (1920)
- The Last Straw (1920)
- The Spirit of Good (1920)
- Just Pals (1920)
- Two Moons (1920)
- The Big Punch (1921)
- Bar Nothing (1921)
- Get Your Man (1921)
- Trooper O'Neill (1922)
- West of Chicago (1922)
- Bells of San Juan (1922)
- The Boss of Camp 4 (1922)
- Roughshod (1922)
- Second Hand Love (1923)
- Cupid's Fireman (1923)
- Not a Drum Was Heard (1924)
- The Vagabond Trail (1924)
- The Circus Cowboy (1924)
- Against All Odds (1924)
- Winner Take All (1924)
- Dick Turpin (1925)
- Lazybones (1925)
- The Arizona Romeo (1925)
- The Timber Wolf (1925)
- The Fighting Buckaroo (1926)
- The Gentle Cyclone (1926)
- A Man Four-Square (1926)
- The Cowboy and the Countess (1926)
- Hills of Peril (1927)
- Whispering Smith (1927)
- The Big Hop (1928)
- The Lone Rider (1930)
- Shadow Ranch (1930)
- Men Without Law (1930)
- The Dawn Trail (1930)
- The Texas Ranger (1931)
- Branded (1931)
- Desert Vengeance (1931)
- The Fighting Sheriff (1931)
- Range Feud (1931)
- Ridin' For Justice (1932)
- South of the Rio Grande (1932)
- High Speed (1932)
- One Man Law (1932)
- White Eagle (1932) remade as a 1941 Serial
- Hello Trouble (1932)
- McKenna of the Mounted (1932)
- Forbidden Trail (1932)
- The California Trail (1933)
- Unknown Valley (1933)
- The Man Trailer (1934)
- The Red Rider (1934) 15-chapter serial
- Stone of Silver Creek (1935)
- Border Brigands (1935)
- Empty Saddles (1936)
- The Boss Rider of Gun Creek (1936)
- Hollywood Round-Up (1937)
- Headin' East (1937)
- Sandflow (1937)
- Boss of Lonely Valley (1937)
- Smoke Tree Range (1937)
- California Frontier (1938)
- Unmarried (1939)
- Forbidden Trails (1941)
- White Eagle (1941) Columbia serial; remake of 1932 feature film
- Riders of Death Valley (1941) Universal serial
- Below the Border (1942)
- Dawn on the Great Divide (1942, released posthumously)

== Bibliography ==
- Jordan, Joan, "A Rodeo Romeo," Photoplay, October 1921, p. 42.
