= Ella O'Neill (screenwriter) =

American screenwriter

- Occupation: Screenwriter
- Years active: 1931–1938

Ella O'Neill was an American screenwriter who penned B movies and serials at Universal in the 1930s. She worked primarily in the action, Western, and detective genres. She had been a practicing attorney in Chicago before she became a serial writer, and she was noted as a language expert.

== Selected filmography ==
- Flaming Frontiers (1938)
- The Phantom Rider (1936)
- Flash Gordon (1936)
- The Adventures of Frank Merriwell (1936)
- Tailspin Tommy in The Great Air Mystery (1935)
- The Roaring West (1935)
- Rustlers of Red Dog (1935)
- Tailspin Tommy (1934)
- The Red Rider (1934)
- The Vanishing Shadow (1934)
- Pirate Treasure (1934)
- The Perils of Pauline (1933)
- Gordon of Ghost City (1933)
- The Phantom of the Air (1933)
- The Rustler's Roundup (1933)
- Clancy of the Mounted (1933)
- The Lost Special (1932)
- Jungle Mystery (1932)
- Heroes of the West (1932)
- The Airmail Mystery (1932)
- Detective Lloyd (1932)
- Battling with Buffalo Bill (1931)
- Danger Island (1931)
- Heroes of the Flames (1931)
- Finger Prints (1931)
