= The Phantom Rider (1936 serial) =

- Film poster
- Directed by: Ray Taylor
- Written by: Basil Dickey; Ella O'Neill; George H. Plympton; Henry MacRae
- Produced by: Henry MacRae
- Starring: Buck Jones; Marla Shelton; Diana Gibson; Harry Woods; Frank LaRue; George Cooper
- Cinematography: John Hickson; Allen Q. Thompson
- Edited by: Saul A. Goodkind; Louis Sackin; Alvin Todd; Edward Todd
- Music by: David Klatzkin
- Distributed by: Universal Pictures
- Release date: July 6, 1936
- Running time: 15 chapters (258 minutes)
- Country: United States
- Language: English

The Phantom Rider is a 1936 American Western film serial directed by Ray Taylor for Universal and starring Buck Jones and Marla Shelton.

== Cast ==
- Buck Jones as Buck Grant
- Marla Shelton as Mary Grayson
- George Cooper as Spooky
- Diana Gibson as Helen Moore
- Harry Woods as Harvey Delaney
- Frank LaRue as Judge Holmes
- Eddie Gribbon as Sheriff Mark
- Matt McHugh as Agent Shorty
- Helen Shipman as Lizzie
- Joey Ray as Steve Scott
- Lafe McKee as Jeff Grayson
- Jim Mason as Dirk, a henchman
- Charles King as Keeler, a henchman
- Clem Bevans as Mr Hudson
- Wally Wales as Lew, a henchman

== Production ==
=== Stunts ===
- Cliff Lyons
- George Plues
- Wally West
- Jay Wilsey

== Chapter titles ==
1. Dynamite
2. The Maddened Herd
3. The Brink of Disaster
4. The Phantom Rides
5. Trapped by Outlaws
6. Shot Down
7. Stark Terror
8. The Night Attack
9. The Indians Attack
10. Human Targets
11. The Shaft of Doom
12. Flaming Gold
13. Crashing Timbers
14. The Last Chance
15. The Outlaw's Vengeance

_{Source:}

== See also ==
- List of film serials
- List of film serials by studio

Preceded by Flash Gordon (1936)	Universal Serial; The Phantom Rider (1936)	Succeeded by Ace Drummond (1936)
