= Harry Tenbrook =

Norwegian-American actor (1887–1960)

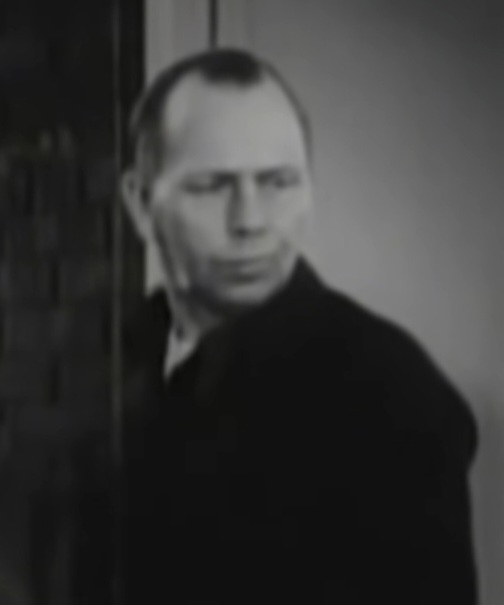
- Tenbrook in Great Guy (1936)
- Born: Henry Olaf Hansen; 9 October 1887; Oslo, Norway
- Died: 4 September 1960 (aged 72); Woodland Hills, Los Angeles, U.S.
- Resting place: Valhalla Memorial Park Cemetery
- Occupation: Actor
- Years active: 1911–1960

Harry Tenbrook (born Henry Olaf Hansen, 9 October 1887 – 4 September 1960) was a Norwegian-American film actor.

== Biography ==
Henry Olaf Hansen was born in Christiania (now Oslo), Norway. His family migrated to the United States in 1892. Under the stage name, Harry Tenbrook, he appeared in more than 330 films between 1911 and 1960. A favorite of John Ford, Tenbrook was a prominent member of the John Ford Stock Company. Only four actors appeared in more Ford films than Tenbrook. He died in Woodland Hills, Los Angeles from lung cancer. He was interred at the Pierce Brothers Valhalla Memorial Park in North Hollywood, California.

== Filmography ==
- The Scarlet Car (1917) - Scrapper (uncredited)
- Thieves' Gold (1918) - 'Colonel' Betoski
- The Third Alarm (1922) - Surly Laborer (uncredited)
- The Danger Rider (1924)
- The Measure of a Man (1924) - Charley
- Capital Punishment (1925) - Executioner
- The Silent Guardian (1925) - Job Stevens
- The Texas Terror (1925)
- Manhattan Madness (1925) - 'Lefty' Lewis
- His People (1925) - Mike
- Lord Jim (1925) - Sailor Who Goes for Water (uncredited)
- The Blue Eagle (1926) - Bascom - a Stoker (uncredited)
- The Self Starter (1926) - Dan Hicks
- Thunderbolt's Tracks (1927) - Corporal Biff Flannagan
- Set Free (1927) - Jim Hart
- Speedy Smith (1927) - Slugger Sampson
- Coney Island (1928) - Brawler (uncredited)
- Sharp Shooters (1928) - Hood (uncredited)
- Four Sons (1928) - Officer (uncredited)
- The Play Girl (1928) - The Chauffeur
- Danger Street (1928) - Borg
- Seven Footprints to Satan (1929) - Eve's Chauffeur
- Eyes of the Underworld (1929) - Gimpy Johnson
- Salute (1929) - Assistant Navy Coach (uncredited)
- The Mysterious Island (1929) - Radio Technician (uncredited)
- Dance Hall (1929) - Nightclub Bouncer (uncredited)
- Alias French Gertie (1930) - Marty the Mug (uncredited)
- The Runaway Bride (1930) - Whitey (uncredited)
- Born Reckless (1930) - Beretti Henchman (uncredited)
- On the Level (1930) - Dawson
- The Sea Wolf (1930) - Axel Johnson
- Scarface (1932) - One of Costillo's Hoods (uncredited)
- Destry Rides Again (1932) - Barfly (uncredited)
- Heroes of the West (1932) - Butch Gore
- Make Me a Star (1932) - Bus Driver (uncredited)
- The Thirteenth Guest (1932) - Cabby (uncredited)
- Speak Easily (1932) - Baggage Man (uncredited)
- Come on Danger! (1932) - Bill - Henchman
- The Fourth Horseman (1932) - Henchman (uncredited)
- Scarlet Dawn (1932) - Revolutionary (uncredited)
- Air Mail (1932) - Airport Worker Yelling 'Crash Wagon' (uncredited)
- Speed Demon (1932) - Bull
- The Lost Special (1932, Serial) - Henchman (uncredited)
- 20,000 Years in Sing Sing (1932) - Convict (uncredited)
- King Kong (1933) - Member of Ship's Crew (uncredited)
- The Little Giant (1933) - Mr. Pulido - a Mug (uncredited)
- The Cohens and Kellys in Trouble (1933) - Minor Role (uncredited)
- Song of the Eagle (1933) - Worker (uncredited)
- The Silk Express (1933) - Silk Loader (uncredited)
- The Woman I Stole (1933) - Oil Worker (uncredited)
- Pilgrimage (1933) - Soldier on Train (uncredited)
- Baby Face (1933) - Laborer (uncredited)
- Gordon of Ghost City (1933, Serial) - Bushwacker (Ch. 9) (uncredited)
- Skyway (1933) - Truck Driver (uncredited)
- Lady for a Day (1933) - Reception Guest (uncredited)
- Penthouse (1933) - Customer at Crelliman's Place (uncredited)
- The Wolf Dog (1933, Serial) - Sailor (uncredited)
- The Bowery (1933) - Fireman (uncredited)
- Lady Killer (1933) - Monkey Delivery Man (uncredited)
- Son of Kong (1933) - Tommy, a Sailor (uncredited)
- Fugitive Lovers (1934) - Policeman (uncredited)
- Palooka (1934) - McSwatt's Handler (uncredited)
- Pirate Treasure (1934, Serial) - Train Man (Ch. 4) (uncredited)
- Gambling Lady (1934) - Funeral Attendee (uncredited)
- Lazy River (1934) - Search Officer on Coast Guard Ship (uncredited)
- The Countess of Monte Cristo (1934) - Man in Bar (uncredited)
- Come On Marines! (1934) - Marine (uncredited)
- Looking for Trouble (1934) - Dispatcher (uncredited)
- The Line-Up (1934) - Man in the Line-up (uncredited)
- The Thin Man (1934) - Guest at Nick's Party (uncredited)
- The Hell Cat (1934) - Sandy (uncredited)
- The World Moves On (1934) - Legionnaire in Trench with Dixie (uncredited)
- Blind Date (1934) - Taxi Driver (uncredited)
- Here Comes the Navy (1934) - Navy Yard Worker (uncredited)
- Friends of Mr. Sweeney (1934) - Gangster with Mike (uncredited)
- The Cat's-Paw (1934) - Gangster (uncredited)
- Beyond the Law (1934) - Crook
- The Count of Monte Cristo (1934) - Pirate Guard (uncredited)
- Judge Priest (1934) - Townsman in Saloon (uncredited)
- Young and Beautiful (1934) - Board Marker (uncredited)
- Lady by Choice (1934) - Sailor (uncredited)
- The Captain Hates the Sea (1934) - Taxi Driver (uncredited)
- Against the Law (1934) - Minor Role (uncredited)
- The St. Louis Kid (1934) - One of Louie's Henchmen (uncredited)
- Kid Millions (1934) - Customer in Music Store (uncredited)
- The Gay Bride (1934) - Scared Mechanic with Armored Car (uncredited)
- The Best Man Wins (1935) - Seaman (uncredited)
- Behind the Evidence (1935) - Gangster (uncredited)
- Rustlers of Red Dog (1935, Serial) - Barfly (Ch. 1) (uncredited)
- The Whole Town's Talking (1935) - Mannion's Henchman on Lookout (uncredited)
- Mutiny Ahead (1935) - Sailor - Diver (uncredited)
- Naughty Marietta (1935) - Prospective Groom (uncredited)
- Black Fury (1935) - Security Force Applicant (uncredited)
- Strangers All (1935) - Courtroom Spectator (uncredited)
- Vagabond Lady (1935) - Yelling Sailor (uncredited)
- $10 Raise (1935) - Warehouse Worker (uncredited)
- The Informer (1935) - Admirer (uncredited)
- Stranded (1935) - Bleekman, Sharkey's Thug (uncredited)
- The Roaring West (1935, Serial) - Henchman Limpy (uncredited)
- The Daring Young Man (1935) - Convict (uncredited)
- Dante's Inferno (1935) - Stoker (uncredited)
- O'Shaughnessy's Boy (1935) - Circus Worker (uncredited)
- Thunder Mountain (1935) - Miner Voting (uncredited)
- Two-Fisted (1935) - Mug (uncredited)
- Barbary Coast (1935) - Chamalis' Henchman (uncredited)
- One Way Ticket (1935) - Guard (uncredited)
- Frisco Kid (1935) - Vigilante (uncredited)
- Millions in the Air (1935) - Mike
- The Littlest Rebel (1935) - Yankee Corporal (uncredited)
- Man of Iron (1935) - Factory Worker (uncredited)
- The Lone Wolf Returns (1935) - Red Dugan (uncredited)
- Tough Guy (1936) - Police Radio Dispatcher (uncredited)
- You May Be Next (1936) - Ernie-Henchman (uncredited)
- Too Many Parents (1936) - Guard (uncredited)
- Panic on the Air (1936) - Taxi Driver (uncredited)
- F-Man (1936) - Gangster (uncredited)
- Trapped by Television (1936) - Policeman (uncredited)
- Kelly the Second (1936) - Ike's Henchman (uncredited)
- High Tension (1936) - Second Bartender (uncredited)
- Mary of Scotland (1936) - One of Queen Mary's Guards (uncredited)
- Women Are Trouble (1936) - Strong-Arm Man (uncredited)
- Sea Spoilers (1936) - Henchman Chuck (uncredited)
- The Magnificent Brute (1936) - Waiter (uncredited)
- Ghost-Town Gold (1936) - Street Brawler (uncredited)
- Come and Get It (1936) - Lumberjack (uncredited)
- Roarin' Lead (1936) - Henchman (uncredited)
- The Plough and the Stars (1936) - Minor Role (uncredited)
- Great Guy (1936) - Joe - Orphanage Receiving Clerk (uncredited)
- Man of the People (1937) - Tough on Picnic Platform (uncredited)
- Girl Overboard (1937) - Cop (uncredited)
- Sea Devils (1937) - Sailor in Bar (uncredited)
- Hit the Saddle (1937) - Joe Harvey - McGowan Henchman
- Midnight Court (1937) - Party Guest (uncredited)
- 23 1/2 Hours Leave (1937) - Stockade Sergeant (uncredited)
- Behind the Headlines (1937) - Barfly (uncredited)
- Meet the Missus (1937) - Stagehand (uncredited)
- Sing and Be Happy (1937) - Truck Driver (uncredited)
- Wee Willie Winkie (1937) - Soldier (uncredited)
- Think Fast, Mr. Moto (1937) - Henchman (uncredited)
- The Big Shot (1937) - Servant (uncredited)
- The Rangers Step In (1937) - Deputy (uncredited)
- Souls at Sea (1937) - Lifeboat Crewman (uncredited)
- Sophie Lang Goes West (1937) - Painter
- Radio Patrol (1937, Serial) - Henchman (uncredited)
- Music for Madame (1937) - Electrician (uncredited)
- Stand-In (1937) - Studio Mob Member (uncredited)
- You're a Sweetheart (1937) - Potential Bodyguard (uncredited)
- In Old Chicago (1938) - Hub Patron (uncredited)
- Hawaiian Buckaroo (1938) - Henchman (uncredited)
- The Jury's Secret (1938) - Minor Role (uncredited)
- Little Miss Roughneck (1938) - Prisoner (uncredited)
- A Slight Case of Murder (1938) - The Stranger
- He Couldn't Say No (1938) - Jostled Subway Rider Taking Seat (uncredited)
- Bluebeard's Eighth Wife (1938) - Male Nurse in Sanitarium (uncredited)
- Rawhide (1938) - Gil - Henchman (uncredited)
- Crime School (1938) - Clerk Outside Morgan's Office (uncredited)
- Kidnapped (1938) - Crewman (uncredited)
- You and Me (1938) - Bartender (uncredited)
- Professor Beware (1938) - Brawler (uncredited)
- Racket Busters (1938) - Martin's Henchman (uncredited)
- Block-Heads (1938) - Pedestrian (uncredited)
- Dick Tracy Returns (1938, Serial) - Fertilizer Warehouse Thug (uncredited)
- The Spider's Web (1938, Serial) - Powerhouse Worker (uncredited)
- Flying G-Men (1939, Serial) - Dugan (uncredited)
- Stagecoach (1939) - Telegraph Operator (uncredited)
- Let Freedom Ring (1939) - Barfly (uncredited)
- The Oklahoma Kid (1939) - Juror #4 (uncredited)
- Society Lawyer (1939) - Crelliman's Henchman (uncredited)
- I'm from Missouri (1939) - Superintendent (uncredited)
- The Lady and the Mob (1939) - Watson's Henchman (uncredited)
- Hotel Imperial (1939) - Sentry (uncredited)
- The Lady's from Kentucky (1939) - Longshoreman (uncredited)
- Mandrake the Magician (1939, Serial) - Streeter (uncredited)
- Young Mr. Lincoln (1939) - Townsman (uncredited)
- The Gracie Allen Murder Case (1939) - Harry (uncredited)
- 6,000 Enemies (1939) - Prisoner (uncredited)
- The Oregon Trail (1939, Serial) - Henchman [Ch. 11] (uncredited)
- Each Dawn I Die (1939) - Convict (uncredited)
- Our Leading Citizen (1939) - Workman (uncredited)
- Daughter of the Tong (1939) - Sam - Henchman (uncredited)
- Blackmail (1939) - Truck Driver at Gas Station (uncredited)
- Oklahoma Frontier (1939) - Henchman Grimes
- Mr. Smith Goes to Washington (1939) - Bodyguard (uncredited)
- The Marshal of Mesa City (1939) - Townsman (uncredited)
- Chip of the Flying U (1939) - Foreign Agent's Henchman (uncredited)
- Destry Rides Again (1939) - Stage Shotgun Rider (uncredited)
- Swanee River (1939) - Jim, Saloon Waiter (uncredited)
- The Shadow (1940, Serial) - Henchman Adams (uncredited)
- The Green Hornet (1940, Serial) - Meadows' Garage Lookout [Ch. 5] / Policeman [Ch. 9] (uncredited)
- The Grapes of Wrath (1940) - Deputy / Troublemaker (uncredited)
- I Take This Woman (1940) - Taxi Driver (scenes deleted)
- Black Friday (1940) - Cabbie (uncredited)
- Johnny Apollo (1940) - Guard Escorting Apollo (uncredited)
- Winners of the West (1940, Serial) - Rooney [Ch. 3] (uncredited)
- Dance, Girl, Dance (1940) - Night Court Spectator (uncredited)
- Ragtime Cowboy Joe (1940) - Henchman Del
- Glamour for Sale (1940) - Mugg (uncredited)
- The Long Voyage Home (1940) - Max
- The Green Archer (1940, Serial) - Brunner (uncredited)
- The Devil's Pipeline (1940) - Prisoner (uncredited)
- Chad Hanna (1940) - Canvasman (uncredited)
- Come Live with Me (1941) - Diner (uncredited)
- White Eagle (1941, Serial) - Nash (uncredited)
- Meet the Chump (1941) - Electrician (uncredited)
- The Penalty (1941) - Worker (uncredited)
- The Lady from Cheyenne (1941) - Bartender (uncredited)
- The Big Boss (1941) - One of the Chain Gang (uncredited)
- Billy the Kid (1941) - Man with Rifle Behind Barred Window (uncredited)
- Rawhide Rangers (1941) - Rancher (uncredited)
- Manpower (1941) - Midnight Club Waiter (uncredited)
- Mystery Ship (1941) - Witness (uncredited)
- Texas (1941) - Handler / Cornerman at Fight (uncredited)
- Ellery Queen and the Murder Ring (1941) - Morgue Attendant (uncredited)
- Holt of the Secret Service (1941, Serial) - Detour Henchman (uncredited)
- Fighting Bill Fargo (1941) - Townsman (uncredited)
- Among the Living (1941) - Mill Worker (uncredited)
- Dick Tracy vs. Crime, Inc. (1941, Serial) - Junction Heavy 2 (uncredited)
- Fly-by-Night (1942) - Truck Driver (uncredited)
- Woman of the Year (1942) - Mug (uncredited)
- Stagecoach Buckaroo (1942) - Stagecoach Guard Slatz
- The Adventures of Martin Eden (1942) - Sailor (uncredited)
- The Ghost of Frankenstein (1942) - Villager at Hearing (uncredited)
- Two Yanks in Trinidad (1942) - Mug (uncredited)
- A Desperate Chance for Ellery Queen (1942) - Doorman Hailing Taxis (uncredited)
- Perils of the Royal Mounted (1942, Serial) - Pedro - Henchman (uncredited)
- Tarzan's New York Adventure (1942) - Circus Roustabout Driving Car (uncredited)
- In Old California (1942) - Saloon Waiter (uncredited)
- Sabotage Squad (1942) - Saboteur (uncredited)
- Overland Mail (1942, Serial) - Miles - Stage Driver [Ch. 10] (uncredited)
- Lucky Legs (1942) - Dan (uncredited)
- You Can't Escape Forever (1942) - Harry - Lonesome Club Bartender (uncredited)
- The Valley of Vanishing Men (1942, Serial) - Cave Henchman (ch's 4, 12) (uncredited)
- Mug Town (1942) - Railroad Bull (uncredited)
- Two Weeks to Live (1943) - Man Pushing Wheelchair (uncredited)
- The Moon Is Down (1943) - Miner (uncredited)
- Frontier Law (1943) - Townsman (uncredited)
- Batman (1943, Serial) - Bartender (uncredited)
- Swing Shift Maisie (1943) - Man in Employment Line (uncredited)
- The Girl from Monterrey (1943) - Fight Spectator (uncredited)
- Gangway for Tomorrow (1943) - Worker (uncredited)
- Government Girl (1943) - Military Policeman (uncredited)
- The Texas Kid (1943) - Henchman (uncredited)
- Marshal of Gunsmoke (1944) - Henchman at Lon's (uncredited)
- Sailor's Holiday (1944) - Laundry Man (uncredited)
- Once Upon a Time (1944) - Shipyard Worker (uncredited)
- Man from Frisco (1944) - Workman (uncredited)
- The Great Moment (1944) - Man at Bar (uncredited)
- Moonlight and Cactus (1944) - Seaman (uncredited)
- The Last Ride (1944) - Hans, a Hoodlum (uncredited)
- Enemy of Women (1944) - Gestapo Man (uncredited)
- Belle of the Yukon (1944) - Harry (uncredited)
- The Lost Weekend (1945) - Drunk in Alcoholic Ward (uncredited)
- They Were Expendable (1945) - 'Squarehead' Larsen SC 2c
- Abilene Town (1946) - First Wagon Driver Caught in Stampede (uncredited)
- The Kid from Brooklyn (1946) - Cop at Train Station (uncredited)
- The Hoodlum Saint (1946) - Mug (uncredited)
- Renegades (1946) - Barfly at Yellow Rock (uncredited)
- Dangerous Business (1946) - Prisoner (uncredited)
- My Brother Talks to Horses (1947) - Bank Guard (uncredited)
- The Law Comes to Gunsight (1947) - Jailed Henchman (uncredited)
- Magic Town (1947) - Shoe Shine Customer (uncredited)
- That Hagen Girl (1947) - Man at Train Station (uncredited)
- Killer McCoy (1947) - Cigones' Handler / Cornerman (uncredited)
- Black Bart (1948) - Barfly (uncredited)
- Fort Apache (1948) - Tom O'Feeney (uncredited)
- Return of the Bad Men (1948) - Man with Judge Harper (uncredited)
- The Babe Ruth Story (1948) - Taxicab Driver (uncredited)
- Kiss the Blood Off My Hands (1948) - Seaman in Pub (uncredited)
- 3 Godfathers (1948) - Bartender (uncredited)
- Act of Violence (1949) - Man (uncredited)
- Shockproof (1949) - Job Applicant (uncredited)
- El Paso (1949) - Barfly (uncredited)
- The Set-Up (1949) - Fight Spectator Behind the Glutton (uncredited)
- Special Agent (1949) - Logger (uncredited)
- Mr. Soft Touch (1949) - Bystander at Fire (uncredited)
- Scene of the Crime (1949) - Passerby (uncredited)
- Pinky (1949) - Townsman (uncredited)
- The Gal Who Took the West (1949) - Soldier (uncredited)
- South Sea Sinner (1950) - Boat Passenger (uncredited)
- When Willie Comes Marching Home (1950) - Joe - Taxi Driver (uncredited)
- The Secret Fury (1950) - Jury Foreman (uncredited)
- Frenchie (1950) - Saloon Patron (uncredited)
- California Passage (1950) - Townsman (uncredited)
- Belle Le Grand (1951) - Miner at Lynching (uncredited)
- Payment on Demand (1951) - Taxi Driver (uncredited)
- Santa Fe (1951) - Missouri Saloon Barfly (uncredited)
- I Was a Communist for the FBI (1951) - Senate Hearing Spectator (uncredited)
- Gunplay (1951) - Henchman (uncredited)
- The Big Gusher (1951) - Casino Gambler (uncredited)
- The Lady and the Bandit (1951) - Pub Customer (uncredited)
- Iron Man (1951) - Fight Crowd Spectator (uncredited)
- Saturday's Hero (1951) - Manuel's Bar Patron (uncredited)
- The Barefoot Mailman (1951) - Theron Henchman (uncredited)
- Lone Star (1952) - Townsman (uncredited)
- The Belle of New York (1952) - Bowery Bum Wearing Dark Reddish Coat (uncredited)
- Singin' in the Rain (1952) - Sound Technician (uncredited)
- The San Francisco Story (1952) - Bartender (uncredited)
- The Quiet Man (1952) - Police Sergeant Hanan (uncredited)
- Scarlet Angel (1952) - Saloon Waiter (uncredited)
- What Price Glory (1952) - Laughing Marine in formation (uncredited)
- O. Henry's Full House (1952) - Bar Customer (uncredited)
- The Turning Point (1952) - Ran at Ringside (uncredited)
- A Perilous Journey (1953) - Bar Patron (uncredited)
- Pickup on South Street (1953) - Elevator Passenger (uncredited)
- Pony Express (1953) - Sacramento Townsman (uncredited)
- South Sea Woman (1953) - Barfly (uncredited)
- Calamity Jane (1953) - Barfly (uncredited)
- Destry (1954) - Barfly (uncredited)
- The Long Gray Line (1955) - Waiter (uncredited)
- Mister Roberts (1955) - Cookie
- The Spoilers (1955) - Commissioner's Deputy (uncredited)
- It's a Dog's Life (1955) - Man at Shoeshine Stand (uncredited)
- Blazing the Overland Trail (1956, Serial) - Henchman (uncredited)
- The Last Hurrah (1958) - Caterer at Wake (uncredited)
- Please Don't Eat the Daisies (1960) - Elevator Passenger (uncredited)
- Inherit the Wind (1960) - Courtroom Spectator (uncredited)
- North to Alaska (1960) - Miner (uncredited)
