= The Lost Special (serial) =

1932 film

- Directed by: Henry MacRae
- Written by: Ella O'Neill; George Morgan; George H. Plympton; Basil Dickey; Arthur Conan Doyle (original story)
- Produced by: Henry MacRae
- Starring: Frank Albertson; Ernie Nevers; Cecilia Parker; Caryl Lincoln
- Cinematography: John Hickson
- Edited by: Alvin Todd; Edward Todd
- Music by: Sam Perry
- Production company: Universal Pictures
- Distributed by: Universal Pictures
- Release date: December 5, 1932
- Running time: 12 chapters (240 minutes)
- Country: United States
- Language: English

The Lost Special is a 1932 American Pre-Code Universal movie serial based on the 1898 short story "The Lost Special" by Arthur Conan Doyle. This adaptation deleted all references to Doyle's Sherlock Holmes character, and moved events to the American Old West.

This was the 84th serial (and the 16th serial with sound) to be released by Universal.

== Plot overview ==
A special train carrying gold bullion is hijacked on its way from the Golconda Mine. Laying down portable tracks, the bandits take the train off the main line, hide it in an abandoned mine shaft, steal the gold, and eradicate their makeshift tracks, leaving a mystery in their wake. Part owner of the mine, Potter Hood, and the railroad president, Horace Moore, search for the mysteriously disappeared train and gold. They are unaware, however, that the criminals are working secretly for Sam Slater, the other partner in the gold mine, who wants to sabotage mine operations enough that he can take over completely. Potter's son, Tom Hood, arrives home from college and determines to solve the mystery with the aid of his pal Bob Collins. They board the gold-shipment special train on its next run. Meanwhile, newspaper reporter Betty Moore – who is niece to the railroad president – and her friend Kate Bland begin their own investigation. After the four youths foil an attempt at a second heist, they join forces. The next 11 chapters show the characters' attempts to locate the "Lost Special" train and identify the ringleader.

Cliff-hanger endings include a runaway car sailing off a cliff into a lake, the heroine's car crashing headlong into an oncoming train and our heroes being trapped by rising water in a dungeon.

== Cast ==
- Frank Albertson as Tom Hood, son of Potter Hood
- Ernie Nevers as Bob Collins, Tom's friend.
- Cecilia Parker as Betty Moore, Reporter and niece of Horace Moore
- Francis Ford as Potter Hood, part owner of the Golconda gold mine
- J. Frank Glendon as Sam Slater, part owner of the Golconda gold mine
- Frank Beal as Horace Moore, owner of the railroad
- Caryl Lincoln as Kate Bland, friend of Betty Moore
- Tom London as Dirk/Detective Dane
- Al Ferguson as Gavin
- Jack Clifford as Doran
- Edmund Cobb as Spike
- Joe Bonomo as Joe
- George Magrill as Lefty
- Reb Russell as one of Bob's college pals
- Larry Steers as Maitre'd (uncredited)
- Harry Tenbrook as Henchman (uncredited)

== Stunts ==
- George DeNormand
- George Magrill

== Production ==
The advertising for the serial stated:

"Another BIG-AUTHOR serial from the same studios that gave you Peter B. Kyne's Heroes of the West and Talbot Mundy's Jungle Mystery"

"Terrifically fast, tremendously thrilling, and packed right with the sort of mystery that only the touch of a master writer can give!"

The Lost Special was Universal's 84th serial. In terms of Universal's serials in the sound era, it was the 16th. The series was written by veteran Universal serial writers Ella O'Neill, Basil Dickey, George Morgan, and George H. Plympton. The director was Henry MacRae. By the time he directed The Lost Special, MacRae had directed more than 100 short films and feature films.

== Chapter titles ==
1. The Lost Special
2. Racing Death
3. The Red Lantern
4. Devouring Flames
5. The Lighting Strikes
6. The House of Mystery
7. The Tank Room Terror
8. The Fatal Race
9. Into the Depths
10. The Jaws of Death
11. The Flaming Forest
12. Retribution

_{Source:}

== See also ==
- List of film serials by year
- List of film serials by studio

Preceded by Jungle Mystery (1932)	Universal Serial; The Lost Special (1932)	Succeeded by Clancy of the Mounted (1933)
