= The Phantom of the Air =

- Directed by: Ray Taylor
- Written by: Basil Dickey; Ella O'Neill; George H. Plympton
- Produced by: Henry MacRae
- Starring: Tom Tyler; Gloria Shea; LeRoy Mason; Craig Reynolds; William Desmond
- Cinematography: John Hickson
- Edited by: Alvin Todd; Edward Todd
- Distributed by: Universal Pictures
- Release date: 1933
- Running time: 12 chapters (240 minutes)
- Country: United States
- Language: English

The Phantom of the Air is a 12-episode 1933 Pre-Code Universal film serial directed by Ray Taylor. The film stars Tom Tyler, who was cast most often in Westerns. Other actors include Gloria Shea, LeRoy Mason, Craig Reynolds and William Desmond. (Note: Along with Mascot Pictures, the lowly "poverty row" studio, Universal Pictures became the only major studio committed to the serial format in the 1930s.)

== Plot ==
Scientist Thomas Edmunds (William Desmond) and his daughter Mary (Gloria Shea) attend the National Air Races in Cleveland, Ohio to find a pilot. They select pilot Bob Raymond (Tom Tyler) from the U.S. Border Patrol, to demonstrate an anti-gravity device called the "Contragrav". At the air meet, Mortimer Crome (LeRoy Mason), a friend of Mary, is his main rival and has his henchman "Skip" (Walter Brennan) sabotage Raymond's aircraft prior to the air race. Raymond crashes but survives.

Edmunds' invention is sought after by a gang of smugglers led by Crome who owns the International Import & Export Company, who wants the invention. The inventor has a secret airfield in a desert region. Raymond comes to the inventor's aid, using another of Edwards' inventions, the superplane, the "Phantom." Able to control the aircraft remotely from an underground headquarters, Bob foils Crome's plans. Gloria has become Bob's love interest.

A last attempt to get at the inventor's work leads to an explosion at his workshop that kills the criminals. Edmunds escapes and is reunited with Gloria and Bob.

== Chapter titles ==
1. The Great Air Meet
2. The Secret of the Desert
3. The Avenging Phantom
4. The Battle in the Clouds
5. Terror of the Heights
6. A Wild Ride
7. The Jaws of Death
8. Aflame in the Sky
9. The Attack
10. The Runaway Plane
11. In the Enemy's Hands
12. Safe Landing

_{Source:}

== Cast ==
- Tom Tyler as Captain Bob Raymond
- Gloria Shea as Mary Edmunds
- LeRoy Mason as Mort Crome, head of a gang of smugglers
- Craig Reynolds as Blade, Raymonds' sidekick
- William Desmond as Mr Thomas Edmunds
- Sidney Bracey as Munsa
- Walter Brennan as "Skip"
- Jennie Cramer as Marie
- Cecil Kellogg as Joe
- Edmund Cobb as Bart, one of Crome's henchmen
- Bud Osborne as Spike, one of Crome's henchmen
- Nelson McDowell as Scotty
- Tom London as Jim
- Ethan Laidlaw as Durkin, one of Crome's henchmen
- Al Ferguson as Al, one of Crome's henchmen

== Production ==
The numerous aircraft in The Phantom of the Air include:

- Travel Air 2000 c/n 456, NC4958
- Travel Air B-4000 c/n 1177, NC631H
- Travel Air 16K c/n 16K-2001, NR446W
- Standard J-1
- Curtiss JN-4
- Stearman C3B
- Emsco B7-C c/n 1, NC969-Y
- Travel Air R Mystery Ship, R-2002, NR613K
- Wedell-Williams 44, c/n 109, NR61-Y

The race at the beginning of Chapter 1 in The Phantom of the Air was the 1932 Cleveland Air Race where Bob Raymond's Wedell-Williams Model 44 racer competed with Crome's Travel Air R Mystery Ship. The Edmunds "Phantom" was an Emsco B7-C, fitted with radio control.

Both Roscoe Turner and "Pancho" Barnes flew in the 1930 National Air Races in Chicago, and their aircraft appear in The Phantom of the Air.

== Reception ==
Aviation historian Christian Santoir in Aeromovies described the impact of The Phantom of the Air as embodying the spirit of the early barnstorming era in Hollywood. "... several sequences of aerial stunts, realized, among others, by Art Goebel, Frank Clarke and Ivan Unger in the twenties. We thus witness the passage from one plane to another, the change of a wheel in full flight. We also go from an airplane to a car, from a fast boat to a plane, in the best tradition of 'stuntmen' in Hollywood."

Preceded by Clancy of the Mounted (1933)	Universal Serial; The Phantom of the Air (1933)	Succeeded by Gordon of Ghost City (1933)
