= Heroes of the Flames =

1931 film

- Directed by: Robert F. Hill
- Written by: Henry MacRae; George H. Plympton; Basil Dickey; George Morgan; Ella O'Neill
- Produced by: Henry MacRae
- Cinematography: John Hickson
- Edited by: Alvin Todd
- Distributed by: Universal Pictures
- Release date: June 2, 1931
- Running time: 12 chapters (220 minutes)
- Country: United States
- Language: English

Heroes of the Flames is a 1931 American Universal movie serial. Although once considered to be lost, it has survived and a print has been preserved by Universal as of 2016. It stars Tim McCoy (in a break from his usual cowboy roles) as a firefighter who is developing a new kind of flame retardant, but his work is constantly being disrupted by a rival named Don Mitchell (Gayne Whitman) who wants the formula for himself as well as the leading lady, played by Marion Shockley. Fittingly, seven of the 11 cliffhangers involve burning buildings with at least one principal trapped inside.

It is unusual for the manner in which chapter recaps are handled: A reporter at a local newspaper repeats a summary of the previous episode as he takes it down from a witness on the phone. It also has no music at all—the opening titles are accompanied only by sound effects (sirens, bells ringing, fire crackling, etc.). It's also the only film in which future star Bruce Cabot appeared in an uncredited bit part.

== Cast ==
- Tim McCoy as Bob Darrow
- [[Marion Shockley as June Madison
- Bobby Nelson (actor)|Bobby Nelson]] as Jackie Madison
- Gayne Whitman as Don Mitchell
- William Gould as John Madison
- Grace Cunard as Mrs. Madison
- Andy Devine as a henchman
- Monte Montague as Bob's sidekick
- Bud Osborne as a henchman
- Edmund Cobb as a henchman
- Joe Bonomo as a henchman
- Walter Brennan -Bit Part – uncredited [Ch. 12]

== Chapter titles ==
1. The Red Peril
2. Flaming Hate
3. The Fire Trap
4. Death's Chariot
5. The Avalanche
6. The Jaws of Death
7. Forest of Fire
8. Blank Cartridges
9. The House of Terror (aka The House of Horror)
10. The Depths of Doom
11. A Flaming Death
12. The Last Alarm

== See also ==
- List of American films of 1931
- List of firefighting films

Preceded by Finger Prints (1930)	Universal Serial; Heroes of the Flames (1931)	Succeeded by Danger Island (1931)
