= Finger Prints (serial) =

1931 film

- Directed by: Ray Taylor
- Written by: Arthur B. Reeve; Basil Dickey; Ella O'Neill; George Morgan; George H. Plympton
- Produced by: Henry MacRae
- Starring: Kenneth Harlan; Edna Murphy; Gayne Whitman; Gertrude Astor
- Cinematography: John Hickson
- Edited by: Alvin Todd
- Distributed by: Universal Pictures
- Release date: March 3, 1931 (U.S.)
- Running time: 10 chapters (210 minutes)
- Country: United States
- Language: English

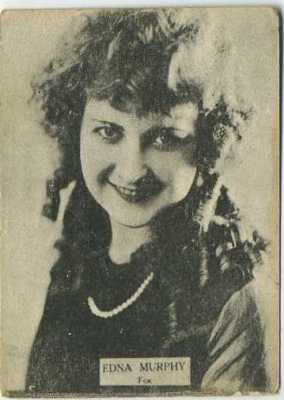
Edna Murphy

Finger Prints is a 1931 American Pre-Code Universal movie serial. It is considered to be a lost film. (This was the last Universal serial with only ten chapters.)

== Plot ==
United States Secret Service agent Gary Gordon (Kenneth Harlan) is working on shutting down the "River Gang", a smuggling ring. His girlfriend Lola's father, John Mackey, is secretly a member of the gang. Soon after, events are complicated when the villainous Kent Martin (Gayne Whitman) attempts to blackmail Mackey for his daughter's hand in marriage. At one point, Lola's father is falsely accused of murder, and agent Gordon tries valiantly to prove his innocence.

== Cast ==
- Kenneth Harlan as Gary Gordon, Secret Service agent
- Edna Murphy as Lola Mackey, Gordon's girlfriend
- Gayne Whitman as Kent Martin, Blackmailer
- Gertrude Astor as Jane Madden, Martin's girlfriend
- William Worthington as John Mackey, Lola's father
- William L. Thorne as Joe Burke, Mackey's partner in the River Gang
- Monte Montague as Officer Rooney

== Chapter titles ==
1. The Dance of Death
2. A Fugitive of Fear
3. Toll of the Sea
4. The Sinister Shadow
5. The Plunge of Peril
6. The Finger of Fate
7. The Depths of Doom
8. The Thundering Terror
9. Flames of Fury
10. The Final Reckoning

_{Source:}

This was the last Universal serial with only ten chapters.

== See also ==
- List of film serials
- List of film serials by studio

Preceded by The Indians are Coming (1930)	Universal Serial; Finger Prints (1931)	Succeeded by Heroes of the Flames (1931)
