= William Desmond (actor) =

American actor (1878–1949)

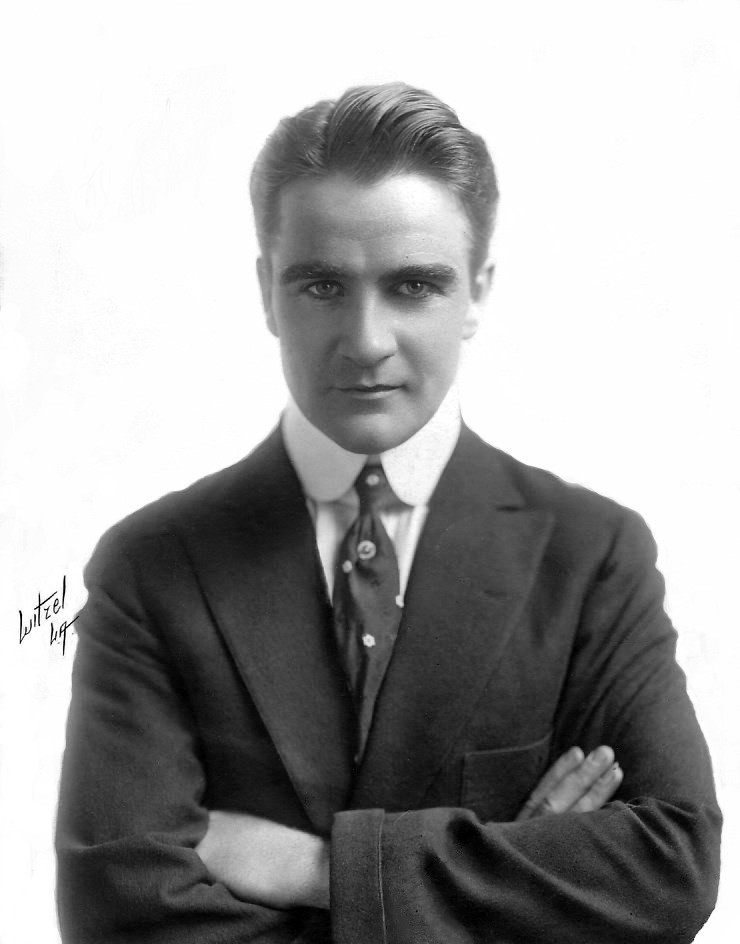
- Desmond in 1915
- Born: William Mannion; January 23, 1878; Salamanca, New York U.S.
- Died: November 3, 1949 (aged 71); Los Angeles, California, U.S.
- Resting place: Chapel of the Pines Crematory
- Occupation: Actor
- Years active: 1915–1949
- Spouse: Mary McIvor (m. 1919-1941)
- Children: 2

William Desmond (born William Mannion; January 23, 1878 – November 3, 1949) was an American actor. He appeared in more than 200 films between 1915 and 1948. He was nicknamed "The King of the Silent Serials".

Born William Mannion in Salamanca, New York on January 23, 1878, he was raised in New York City. He later changed his surname to a stage name. He started out in vaudeville and the legitimate stage before making his film debut. In 1919, he married his co-star Mary McIvor, with whom he had two daughters.

He portrayed a globetrotting hero, Phineas Fogg the 3rd, in a now lost film serial from the twenties. With the coming of sound he gravitated to older, supporting roles.

On November 3, 1949, Desmond died at age 71 of a heart attack in Los Angeles, California. His cremated remains are stored in the vault at the Chapel of the Pines Crematory, Los Angeles.

== Selected filmography ==
- Kilmeny (1915) - Bob Meredith
- The Majesty of the Law (1915) - Jackson Morgan Kent
- Peer Gynt (1915) - The Parson
- Peggy (1916) - Rev. Donald Bruce
- Bullets and Brown Eyes (1916) - Prince Carl
- The Waifs (1916) - Arthur Rayburn
- Not My Sister (1916) - Michael Arnold
- The Sorrows of Love (1916) - Guido Perli
- The Captive God (1916)
- The Payment (1916) - Dick
- Lieutenant Danny, U.S.A. (1916) - Lt. Danny Ward
- The Dawn Maker (1916) - Bruce Smithson
- The Criminal (1916) - Donald White
- A Gamble in Souls (1916) - Arthur Worden, Evangelist
- The Iced Bullet (1917) - The Author / Horace Lee
- The Last of the Ingrams (1917) - Jules Ingram
- Blood Will Tell (1917) - Samson Oakley III
- Paddy O'Hara (1917) - Paddy O'Hara
- Paws of the Bear (1917) - Ray Bourke
- Time Locks and Diamonds (1917) - Silver Jim Farrel
- Master of His Home (1917) - Carson Stewart
- Flying Colors (1917) - Brent Brewster
- Married in Name Only (1917)
- Fighting Back (1917) - The Weakling
- The Sudden Gentleman (1917) - Garry Garrity
- Captain of His Soul (1918) - Horace Boyce
- The Sea Panther (1918) - Paul Le Marsan
- Society for Sale (1918) - Honorable Billy
- An Honest Man (1918) - Benny Boggs
- Old Hartwell's Cub (1918) - Bill Hartwell
- Closin' In (1918) - Jack Bradon
- Hell's End (1918) - Jack Donovan
- Beyond the Shadows (1918) - Jean Du Bois
- Wild Life (1918) - Chick Ward
- The Pretender (1918) - Bob Baldwin
- Deuce Duncan (1918) - Deuce Duncan
- Life's a Funny Proposition (1919) - Jimmie Pendleton
- The Prodigal Liar (1919) - Percival Montgomery Edwards
- Her Code of Honor (1919) - Eugene La Salle
- Whitewashed Walls (1919) - Larry Donovan
- The Mints of Hell (1919) - Dan Burke
- Bare-Fisted Gallagher (1919) - 'Bare-Fisted' Gallagher
- A Sagebrush Hamlet (1919) - Larry Lang
- Dangerous Waters (1919) - Jimmie Moulton
- The Blue Bandanna (1919) - Jerry Jerome
- The Prince and Betty (1919) - John Maude
- A Broadway Cowboy (1920) - Burke Randolph
- Twin Beds (1920) - Harry Hawkins
- The Parish Priest (1920) - Reverend John Whalen
- Women Men Love (1921) - David Hunter
- The Child Thou Gavest Me (1921) - Tom Marshall
- Dangerous Toys (1921) - Jack Gray
- Fightin' Mad (1921) - Bud McGraw
- Don't Leave Your Husband (1921)
- Perils of the Yukon (1922) - Jack Merrill
- Night Life in Hollywood (1922) - Himself
- Around the World in Eighteen Days (1923) - Phineas Fogg III
- The Phantom Fortune (1923) - Larry Barclay
- McGuire of the Mounted (1923) - Bob McGuire
- Shadows of the North (1923) - Ben 'Wolf' Darby
- Beasts of Paradise (1923) - Phil Grant
- The Extra Girl (1923) - William Desmond - Actor
- The Eagle's Talons (1923)
- The Breathless Moment (1924) - Billy Carson
- Big Timber (1924) - Walter Sandry
- The Measure of a Man (1924) - John Fairmeadow
- The Sunset Trail (1924) - Happy Hobo
- The Riddle Rider (1924) - Randolph Parker / The Riddle Rider
- Hello, 'Frisco (1924 short) - Himself - William Desmond
- Outwitted (1925) - Jack Blaisdel
- Ridin' Pretty (1925) - Sky Parker
- Barriers of the Law (1925) - Rex Brandon
- Duped (1925) - John Morgan
- Straight Through (1925) - Good Deed O'Day
- The Burning Trail (1925) - Smiling Bill Flannigan
- Blood and Steel (1925) - Gordon Steele
- The Meddler (1925) - Richard Gilmore
- Ace of Spades (1925 serial) - Dan Harvey
- Ace of Spies (1925)
- The Winking Idol (1926) - Dave Ledbetter
- Strings of Steel (1926) - Ned Brown
- Tongues of Scandal (1927) - Gov. John Rhodes
- The Return of the Riddle Rider (1927) - Randolph Parker / The Riddle Rider
- Red Clay (1927) - Chief John Nisheto
- The Vanishing Rider (1928) - Jim Davis / The Vanishing Rider
- The Devil's Trademark (1928) - Morgan Gray
- The Mystery Rider (1928) - Winthrop Lane / The Mystery Rider
- No Defense (1929) - John Harper
- The Phantom of the West (1931) - Martin Blair
- The Vanishing Legion (1931) - Milesburg Sheriff
- First Aid (1931) - Chief of Police
- Hell-Bent for Frisco (1931) - The Editor
- Oklahoma Jim (1931) - Lacy
- The Lightning Warrior (1931 serial) - Townsman (uncredited)
- Battling with Buffalo Bill (1931) - John Mills
- Heroes of the West (1932) - John Blaine
- The Last Frontier (1932 serial) - General Custer (Ch. 1)
- Jungle Mystery (1932) - John Morgan
- A Scarlet Week-End (1932)
- Clancy of the Mounted (1933) - Dave Moran
- Rustlers' Roundup (1933) - San Dimas Sheriff Holden
- The Three Musketeers (1933 serial) - Captain Boncour
- The Whispering Shadow (1933 serial) - Empire Transport Co. driver (uncredited)
- The Phantom of the Air (1933 serial) - Thomas Edmonds
- Laughing at Life (1933) - Military Cabinet Officer
- Gordon of Ghost City (1933 serial) - John Mulford
- Strawberry Roan (1933) - Colonel Brownlee
- The Perils of Pauline (1933 serial) - Prof. Thompson [Chs. 9-12]
- Fargo Express (1933) - Sheriff Joe Thompson
- Pirate Treasure (1934) - Capt. Jim Carson
- Border Guns (1934) - Dr. Jim Wilson
- The Vanishing Shadow (1934 serial) - Newspaper Editor MacDonald
- I Can't Escape (1934) - Parole Officer Donovan
- The Red Rider (1934 serial) - Sheriff Campbell
- The Way of the West (1934) - 'Cash' Horton
- Tailspin Tommy (1934 serial) - Sloane - Taggart's Office Henchman, Chs. 4, 7, 10-11
- Frontier Days (1934) - Sheriff Barnes
- Gunfire (1934) - Townsman (uncredited)
- The Rawhide Terror (1934) - Tom Blake - Betty's Older Brother
- When Lightning Strikes (1934) - Marshall Jack Stevens
- Rustlers of Red Dog (1935 serial) - Ira Dale (Wagonmaster)
- Five Bad Men (1935) - Colonel Matoon
- Defying the Law (1935) - Jim Kenmore
- Naughty Marietta (1935) - Gendarme Chief (uncredited)
- Born to Battle (1935) - John Brownell
- Devil's Canyon (1935)
- The Cowboy and the Bandit (1935) - Sheriff Pete
- Cyclone of the Saddle (1935) - Wagon Master
- The Call of the Savage (1935) - Allen
- The Tia Juana Kid (1935) - Cantina Owner
- The Phantom Cowboy (1935) - Barfly (uncredited)
- The Ghost Rider (1935) - Guard
- Social Error (1935) - Policeman (uncredited)
- The Roaring West (1935) - Jim Parker
- Powdersmoke Range (1935) - Happy - Bartender
- Rough Riding Ranger (1935) - Major Wright
- Courage of the North (1935) - Gene Travis
- Tailspin Tommy in the Great Air Mystery (1935 serial) - Foreman Burke [Chs. 7-9,11-12] (uncredited)
- Nevada (1935) - Wilson
- Frisco Kid (1935) - Vigilante Hangman (uncredited)
- Timber Terrors (1935) - Royce Horter
- Custer's Last Stand (1936 serial) - Wagon Master [Ch. 1] (as Bill Desmond)
- The Broken Coin (1936)
- The Adventures of Frank Merriwell (1936 serial) - Captain of the 'Viking' (uncredited)
- Song of the Saddle (1936) - Stage Driver Tim
- Flash Gordon (1936 serial) - Hawkman Lookout Captain (uncredited)
- The Clutching Hand (1936 serial) - Bartender Steve [Chs.5,8,10-12,14] (uncredited)
- Treachery Rides the Range (1936) - Bill - Stage Driver (uncredited)
- Hollywood Boulevard (1936) - Pago Pago Patron (uncredited)
- The Vigilantes Are Coming (1936) - Anderson
- The Black Coin (1936) - Cantina Bartender
- Cavalry (1936) - Cavalry Major (uncredited)
- Song of the Gringo (1936) - Bailiff
- Headin' for the Rio Grande (1936) - Mr. Mack
- Arizona Days (1937) - Stranger (uncredited)
- The Mysterious Pilot (1937 serial) - Lumberjack / Townsman (uncredited)
- Tim Tyler's Luck (1937 serial) - Dock Official [Ch. 1] (uncredited)
- Man of Conquest (1939) - Tennessee Man (uncredited)
- Winners of the West (1940 serial) - Bill Brine - Foreman
- The Boys from Syracuse (1940) - Citizen (uncredited)
- Junior G-Men (1940 serial) - Irish Cop [Ch. 6] (uncredited)
- A Little Bit of Heaven (1940) - Uncle Francis
- Where Did You Get That Girl? (1941) - Tourist (uncredited)
- Nice Girl? (1941) - Postman (uncredited)
- Bury Me Not on the Lone Prairie (1941) - Bartender
- Sky Raiders (1941 serial) - Murphy - Police Officer [Ch. 9] (uncredited)
- Don Winslow of the Navy (1942 serial) - Pat - Smelter Foreman [Ch. 5] (uncredited)
- Stagecoach Buckaroo (1942) - Barfly (uncredited)
- Raiders of the West (1942) - Townsman (uncredited)
- Gang Busters (1942 serial) - Rogan's Death Witness [Ch. 4] (uncredited)
- Junior G-Men of the Air (1942 serial) - Parts Customer [Ch. 1] (uncredited)
- Down Rio Grande Way (1942) - Townsman (uncredited)
- The Silver Bullet (1942) - Townsman (uncredited)
- Overland Mail (1942 serial) - Williams - Banker [Chs. 5, 12] (uncredited)
- Sin Town (1942) - Town Leader (uncredited)
- Prairie Chickens (1943) - Cache Lake Townsman (uncredited)
- Cheyenne Roundup (1943) - Pete (uncredited)
- Frontier Fury (1943) - Townsman (uncredited)
- The Lone Star Trail (1943) - Bartender Mike (uncredited)
- Frontier Badmen (1943) - Townsman (uncredited)
- Phantom of the Opera (1943) - Stagehand (uncredited)
- Thank Your Lucky Stars (1943) - Westerner in Dennis Morgan Number (uncredited)
- Marshal of Gunsmoke (1944) - Barfly (uncredited)
- Oklahoma Raiders (1944) - Townsman Grinning at Banjo's Fall (uncredited)
- The Scarlet Claw (1944) - Member of Royal Canadian Occult Society (uncredited)
- The Yellow Rose of Texas (1944) - Townsman (uncredited)
- The Mummy's Ghost (1944) - Museum Tourist (uncredited)
- National Barn Dance (1944) - Farmer at Barn Dance (uncredited)
- Tall in the Saddle (1944) - Town Citizen (uncredited)
- The Climax (1944) - Backstage Technician (uncredited)
- Bowery to Broadway (1944) - Man at Bar (uncredited)
- The Old Texas Trail (1944) - Townsman (uncredited)
- Firebrands of Arizona (1944) - Townsman (uncredited)
- Hi, Beautiful (1944) - Passenger (uncredited)
- See My Lawyer (1945) - Bystander (uncredited)
- Song of the Sarong (1945) - Councillor (uncredited)
- The Return of the Durango Kid (1945) - Street Ambusher (uncredited)
- Beyond the Pecos (1945) - Bill - Barfly (uncredited)
- The Naughty Nineties (1945) - (uncredited)
- That Night with You (1945) - Man in Market (uncredited)
- Strange Confession (1945) - Peanut Vendor (uncredited)
- The Royal Mounted Rides Again (1945) - Miner at Meeting (uncredited)
- Frontier Gal (1945) - Barfly (uncredited)
- The Scarlet Horseman (1946 serial) - Barfly (uncredited)
- Code of the West (1947) - Settler (uncredited)
- The Michigan Kid (1947) - Townsman (uncredited)
- The Egg and I (1947) - Spectator at County Fair (uncredited)
- Relentless (1948) - Townsman on Porch (uncredited)
- Are You with It? (1948) - Spectator (uncredited)
