= Clancy of the Mounted =

1933 film

- Directed by: Ray Taylor
- Written by: Basil Dickey (continuity); Harry O. Hoyt (adaptation); Ella O'Neill (dialogue)
- Based on: "Clancy of the Mounted Police" by Robert W. Service
- Produced by: Henry MacRae
- Cinematography: John Hickson
- Edited by: Maurice Pivar (supervising); Alvin Todd; Edward Todd
- Distributed by: Universal Pictures
- Release date: February 23, 1933
- Running time: 12 chapters (225 minutes)
- Country: United States
- Language: English

Clancy of the Mounted (1933) is an American pre-Code Universal movie serial based on the poem "Clancy of the Mounted Police" by Robert W. Service, directed by Ray Taylor. Tom Tyler played Sgt. Clancy, and William L. Thorne played the villainous claim jumper, Black McDougal.

This was Universal's 85th serial and the 17th with sound. Though long considered lost, the first six chapters were released on DVD by Hermitage Hill Media in 2012; According to MDB the British Film Institute (BFI) holds a 35mm print of all 12 chapters in completion

== Plot ==
Sergeant Tom Clancy, of the North-West Mounted Police, is assigned to arrest his own brother Steve, who has been framed for murdering a neighbor by "Black" McDougal and Pierre LaRue.

== Cast ==
- Tom Tyler as Sergeant Tom Clancy
- Jacqueline Wells as Ann Laurie
- William Desmond as Dave Moran
- Francis Ford as Inspector Cabot
- Tom London as Constable McGregor
- Edmund Cobb as Constable McIntosh
- William L. Thorne as "Black" McDougal, outlaw and claim jumper
- Rosalie Roy as Maureen Clancy
- Earl McCarthy as Steve (Tom Clancy's brother)
- Iron Eyes Cody as Indian
- Steve Clemente as Patouche
- Frank Lackteen as Wolf Fang
- Leon Beauman as Pierre LaRue (credited as Leon Duval)

== Chapter titles ==
1. Toll of the Rapids
2. Brother Against Brother
3. Ambuscade
4. The Storm
5. A Desperate Chance
6. The Wolf's Fangs
7. The Night Attack
8. Crashing Timbers
9. Fingerprints
10. The Breed Strikes
11. The Crimson Jacket
12. Journey's End

_{Source:}

== See also ==
- List of American films of 1933
- List of film serials by year
- List of film serials by studio

Preceded by The Lost Special (1932)	Universal Serial; Clancy of the Mounted (1933)	Succeeded by The Phantom of the Air (1933)
