= Red Barry (serial) =

- Directed by: Ford Beebe; Alan James
- Written by: Norman S. Hall; Ray Trampe; Will Gould (comic strip)
- Produced by: Henry MacRae; Barney A. Sarecky (associate)
- Starring: Buster Crabbe; Edna Sedgewick; Frances Robinson; Cyril Delevanti; Frank Lackteen
- Cinematography: Jerome Ash
- Edited by: Saul A. Goodkind; Louis Sackin; Alvin Todd
- Music by: Charles Previn
- Distributed by: Universal Pictures
- Release date: 1938
- Running time: 13 chapters (256 minutes)
- Country: United States
- Language: English

Red Barry is a 1938 13-chapter Universal movie serial based on the comic strip Red Barry by Will Gould.

== Plot ==
An undercover police detective sets out to discover who stole $2 million in bonds.

== Cast ==
- Buster Crabbe as Red Barry. This was one of the few serial roles for Buster Crabbe in normal clothing.
- Edna Sedgewick as Natacha
- Frances Robinson as Mississippi
- Cyril Delevanti as Wing Fu
- Frank Lackteen as Quong Lee
- Wade Boteler as Inspector Scott
- Hugh Huntley as Harry Dycer, aka Valentine Vane
- Philip Ahn as Hong Kong Cholly
- William Ruhl as C.E. Mannix
- William Gould as Commissioner
- Wheeler Oakman as Weaver
- Stanley Price as Petrov
- Earl Douglas as Igor
- Charles Stevens as Captain Moy
- Eric Wilton as Tubbs, Vane's Butler

== Chapter titles ==
_{Source:}

1. Millions for Defense
2. The Curtain Falls
3. The Decoy
4. High Stakes
5. Desperate Chances
6. The Human Target
7. Midnight Tragedy
8. The Devil's Disguise
9. Between Two Fires
10. The False Trail
11. Heavy Odds
12. The Enemy Within
13. Mission of Mercy

== See also ==
- List of film serials
- List of film serials by studio

| Preceded by Flaming Frontiers (1938) | Universal Serial; Red Barry (1938) | Succeeded by Scouts to the Rescue (1939) |
