= Rustlers of Red Dog =

1935 film

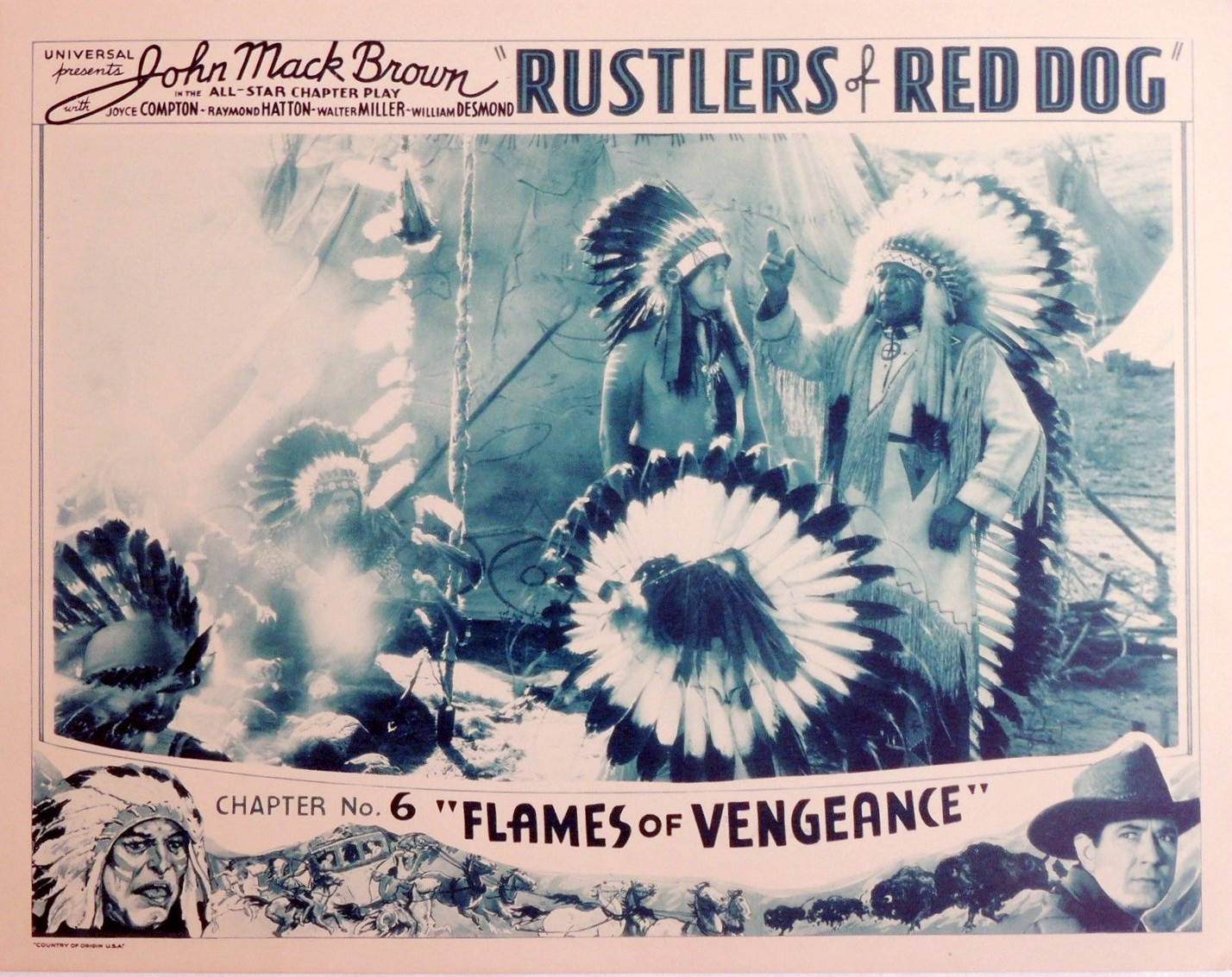
- Lobby card
- Directed by: Lew Landers
- Written by: George H. Plympton; Basil Dickey; Ella O'Neill; Nate Gatzert; Vin Moore; Nathaniel Eddy
- Produced by: Milton Gatzert; Henry MacRae (associate)
- Starring: Johnny Mack Brown; Joyce Compton; Raymond Hatton; Walter Miller; Harry Woods
- Cinematography: Richard Fryer; William A. Sickner
- Edited by: Irving Applebaum; Saul A. Goodkind; Alvin Todd; Edward Todd
- Distributed by: Universal Pictures
- Release date: January 21, 1935
- Running time: 12 chapters (231 min)
- Country: United States
- Language: English

Rustlers of Red Dog is a 1935 American Western film serial from Universal Pictures based on the book The Great West That Was by William "Buffalo Bill" Cody. It was a remake of the earlier 1930 serial The Indians are Coming.

== Plot ==
Jack Wood and his pals make a journey across the West and come up against rustlers, Indian attacks and outlaw gangs.

== Cast ==
- Johnny Mack Brown as Jack Wood
- Joyce Compton as Mary Lee
- Raymond Hatton as Laramie
- Walter Miller as "Deacon"
- Harry Woods as "Rocky"
- Fred MacKaye as Snakey
- William Desmond as Ira Dale, the wagon master
- Charles K. French as Tom Lee
- J.P. McGowan as Capt. Trent
- Lafe McKee as Bob Lee
- Edmund Cobb as Henchman Buck
- Chief Thundercloud as Chief Grey Wolf
- Chief Many Treaties as Indian
- Jim Thorpe as Chief Scarface

== Production ==
=== Stunts ===
- Cliff Lyons
- George Magrill
- Frank McCarroll
- Wally West

== Chapter titles ==
1. Hostile Redskins
2. Flaming Arrows
3. Thundering Hoofs [sic]
4. Attack at Dawn
5. Buried Alive
6. Flames of Vengeance
7. Into the Depths
8. Paths of Peril
9. The Snake Strikes
10. Riding Wild
11. The Rustlers Clash
12. Law and Order

_{Source:}

== Comic book tie-in ==
The first issue of New Fun Comics featured Jack Woods in a strip on its cover. The issue also featured a short text piece on the forthcoming serial, calling it "Rustlers of Red Gap". Whether that was a mistake or an earlier unused title is unknown.

== See also ==
- List of film serials
- List of film serials by studio

Preceded by Tailspin Tommy (1934)	Universal Serial; Rustlers of Red Dog (1935)	Succeeded by The Call of the Savage (1935)
