= Jungle Mystery =

1932 film

- Poster of chapter 1
- Directed by: Ray Taylor
- Written by: Ella O'Neill; Basil Dickey; George H. Plympton; George Morgan
- Based on: The Ivory Trail (a novel) by Talbot Mundy
- Produced by: Henry Mac Rae; Carl Laemmle
- Starring: Tom Tyler; Noah Beery Jr. William Desmond; Cecilia Parker
- Distributed by: Universal Pictures
- Release date: September 12, 1932
- Running time: 12 chapters (240 min)
- Country: United States
- Language: English

Jungle Mystery is a 1932 American pre-Code Universal 12-chapter movie serial directed by Ray Taylor. The serial was based on a book called The Ivory Trail by Talbot Mundy. A 1935 feature version was also released, edited down to 75 minutes.

== Plot ==
Various expeditionary parties head to Zanzibar to search for a legendary cache of ivory and a missing explorer named Jack Morgan. Tom Tyler played the hero, Kirk Montgomery, and Cecilia Parker played the heroine, Barbara Morgan, who is searching for her missing brother Jack. Boris Shillov and his henchman Comrade Krotsky are also searching for the ivory. The "jungle mystery" pertains to a half-man, half-ape creature named Zungu.

== Cast ==
- Tom Tyler as Kirk Montgomery
- Noah Beery Jr. as Fred Oakes
- Cecilia Parker as Barbara Morgan
- William Desmond as John Morgan (Barbara's father)
- Philo McCullough as Georgie Coutlass
- Carmelita Geraghty as Belle Waldron
- James A. Marcus as Boris Shillov
- Anders Van Haden as Comrade Krotsky (Shillov's chief henchman)
- Frank Lackteen as Kazimoto
- Peggy Watts as Azu (Barbara's servant)
- Sam Baker as Zungu (the title character; half-man, half-ape)
- Onslow Stevens as Jack Morgan (Barbara's missing brother; uncredited)
- Ralph Morgan as Recap Narrator (voice; uncredited)

== Production ==
The film is noteworthy for its extensive use of stock footage of various jungle animals, many of them repeated frequently throughout the serial. (There's even a shot of tigers, which are not native to Africa.) Apart from one sequence filmed in Bronson Canyon, it was shot entirely on the Universal backlot and soundstages.

Although it had been believed lost for many years, the original nitrate negative was in fact still in the Universal vaults. It was preserved in 2016 (along with the edited 1935 feature version which ran only 75 minutes) and officially re-premiered at the Cinecon Classic Film Festival in Hollywood, CA during the 2016 Labor Day weekend.

== Chapter titles ==
1. Into the Dark Continent
2. The Ivory Trail
3. The Death Stream
4. Poisoned Fangs
5. The Mystery Cavern
6. Daylight Doom
7. The Jaws of Death
8. Trapped by the Enemy
9. The Jungle Terror
10. Ambushed!
11. The Lion's Fury
12. Buried Treasure

_{Source:}

Preceded by Heroes of the West (1932)	Universal Serial; Jungle Mystery (1932)	Succeeded by The Lost Special (1932)
