= Battling with Buffalo Bill =

1931 film

- Theatrical release poster
- Directed by: Ray Taylor
- Written by: Henry MacRae, Ella O'Neill, Basil Dickey, George H. Plympton
- Based on: The Great West That Was by William F. "Buffalo Bill" Cody
- Produced by: Henry MacRae
- Starring: Tom Tyler; Lucile Browne; William Desmond; Rex Bell; Francis Ford
- Cinematography: John Hickson
- Edited by: Alvin Todd
- Production company: Universal Pictures
- Distributed by: Universal Pictures
- Release date: November 28, 1931 (USA)
- Running time: 217 minutes, 12 chapters
- Country: United States
- Language: English

Battling with Buffalo Bill is a 1931 American pre-Code Western serial film directed by Ray Taylor and starring Tom Tyler, Lucile Browne, William Desmond, Rex Bell, and Francis Ford.

Based on the book The Great West That Was by William F. "Buffalo Bill" Cody, the film is about a cowboy named Buffalo Bill who goes up against a shady gambler who is attempting to scare off the townspeople so he can gain possession of a gold strike. When a nearby Indian tribe is provoked into attacking the town, the cavalry rides in to the rescue. Cody's book was also used as the inspiration for the studio's highly successful 1930 serial The Indians Are Coming. Battling with Buffalo Bill was Universal Pictures's 78th serial, the 10th with sound and 4th with full sound, of the studio's total of 137 serials.

== Plot ==
The plot is a variation on the standard B-Western "Land Grab" plot: Gold has been discovered in the area and gambler Jim Rodney intends to make sole claim to it by pushing the rightful owners off the land and taking it for himself. To do so he has his henchmen kill an Indian woman, provoking attacks from her tribe. This brings Buffalo Bill and the United States Cavalry into the town. Buffalo Bill proceeds to defeat Rodney and his schemes.

== Cast ==
- Tom Tyler as William "Buffalo Bill" Cody
- Lucile Browne as Jane Mills, Buffalo Bill's love interest
- William Desmond as John Mills
- Rex Bell as Dave Archer, Buffalo Bill's sidekick.
- Francis Ford as Jim Rodney, villainous gambler trying to illicitly claim a local gold strike
- George Regas as 'Breed' Johns
- Yakima Canutt as Scout Jack Brady
- Bud Osborne as Joe Tampas, one of Rodney's henchmen
- Joe Bonomo as Joe Brady
- Jim Thorpe as Swift Arrow
- George Sowards as George

== Production ==
Along with the more successful The Indians Are Coming (1930) this serial was based on the book "The Great West That Was" by Buffalo Bill Cody.

=== Stunts ===
- Joe Bonomo
- Yakima Canutt
- Cliff Lyons

== Chapter titles ==
1. Captured by Redskins
2. Circling Death
3. Between Hostile Tribes
4. The Savage Horde
5. The Fatal Plunge
6. Trapped
7. The Unseen Killer
8. Sentenced to Death
9. The Death Trap
10. A Shot from Ambush
11. The Flaming Death
12. Cheyenne Vengeance

_{Source:}

== See also ==
- List of American films of 1931
- List of film serials by year
- List of film serials by studio

Preceded by Danger Island (1931)	Universal Serial; Battling with Buffalo Bill (1931)	Succeeded by The Spell of the Circus (1931)
