= Flaming Frontiers =

1938 film

- Directed by: Alan James; Ray Taylor
- Written by: Peter B. Kyne; Wyndham Gittens; George H. Plympton
- Starring: Johnny Mack Brown
- Cinematography: Richard Fryer (uncredited)
- Distributed by: Universal Pictures
- Release date: July 5, 1938
- Running time: 15 chapters
- Country: United States
- Language: English

Flaming Frontiers (1938) is a Universal movie serial starring Johnny Mack Brown. It was a remake of Heroes of the West (1932). It was re-edited into a TV series in 1966. Much of the material was reused in Lon Chaney Jr.'s 1942 serial Overland Mail.

== Synopsis ==
Prospector Tom Grant discovers a rich gold vein up South. His findings however, soon attract landowner Bart Eaton. Tom's sister Mary heads for the gold fields with Eaton and his men following. Eaton teams up with Ace Daggett who plans to doublecross him and get the gold for himself. They then frame Tom for murder and then try to get him to sign over his claim. The scout Tex Houston is on hand, escaping the attempts on his life, saving Mary from various perils, and trying to bring in the real killer and clear Tom...

== Cast ==
- Johnny Mack Brown as Tex Houston
- Eleanor Hansen as Mary Grant
- James Blaine as Bart Eaton
- Charles Stevens as Henchman Breed
- William Royle as Henchman Crosby
- Edward Cassidy as Henchman Joe
- Jack Rutherford as Buffalo Bill Cody / Daggett Henchman Rand
- Charles Middleton as Ace Daggett
- Ralph Bowman as Tom Grant
- Chief Thundercloud as Thundercloud
- Horace Murphy as The Sheriff
- Karl Hackett as Daggett Henchman Jake
- Charles King as Daggett Henchman Blackie
- Jack Roper as Wolf Moran
- Bill Hazlett as Chief Spotted Elk
- James Farley as Wagonmaster Hawkins
- Eddy Waller as Andy Grant

== Production ==
Along with Heroes of the West (1932) this serial was based on "The Tie That Binds" by Peter B. Kyne.

== Chapter titles ==
1. The River Runs Red
2. Death Rides the Wind
3. Treachery at Eagle Pass
4. A Night of Terror
5. Blood and Gold
6. Trapped by Fire
7. The Human Target
8. The Savage Horde
9. Toll of the Torrent
10. In the Claws of the Cougar
11. The Half Breed's Revenge
12. The Indians Are Coming
13. The Fatal Plunge
14. Dynamite
15. A Duel to the Death

_{Source:}

== See also ==
- List of American films of 1938
- List of film serials
- List of film serials by studio

Preceded by Flash Gordon's Trip to Mars (1938)	Universal Serial; Flaming Frontiers (1938)	Succeeded by Red Barry (1938)
