= Johnnie Morris (actor) =

American actor

Johnnie Morris (June 15, 1887 – October 7, 1969) was an American actor and comedian who began his career in Vaudeville and then worked in the movies.

== Biography ==
Morris was born in New York City. In 1905, he was hired by Gene Leroy to be part of the Leroy Trio, a Vaudeville act which featured Leroy as a drag singer with two teenage singers supporting him. The other member of the group was a 15-year-old Julius Marx in his professional debut. The Trio first performed at the Ramona Theatre, in Grand Rapids, MI on July 16, 1905.

The diminutive actor played newsboys, jockeys, and characters named 'Peewee' in a film career that lasted from 1912 to 1942. One of his most notable roles was that of Pappy Yokum in the 1940 film version of Li'l Abner.

He died on October 7, 1969, in Hollywood, California.

== Partial filmography ==
- Love and Learn (1928) - Bum (as Johnny Morris)
- The Fifty-Fifty Girl (1928)
- The Street of Sin (1928)
- Big Money (1930)
- Once in a Lifetime (1932)
- Sons of the Legion (1938)
- The Gentleman from Arizona (1939)
- Li'l Abner (1940) - Pappy Yokum
