= The Lightning Express =

1930 film

- Directed by: Henry MacRae
- Written by: Ford Beebe (screenplay)
- Produced by: Henry MacRae
- Starring: Lane Chandler; Louise Lorraine; Al Ferguson
- Edited by: Alvin Todd; Edward Todd
- Music by: Sam Perry
- Distributed by: Universal Pictures
- Release date: June 3, 1930
- Running time: 10 chapters (220 minutes)
- Country: United States
- Language: English

The Lightning Express is a 1930 American pre-Code Universal film serial, featuring the adventures of "Whispering Smith" (played by Al Ferguson). This serial is considered a lost film.

The serial's story focuses on whether a railroad will be allowed to cross a family's property.

== Cast ==
- Lane Chandler as Jack Venable
- Louise Lorraine as Bobbie
- Al Ferguson as detective Whispering Smith
- Greta Granstedt as Kate
- J. Gordon Russell as Frank Sayer, the villain
- John Oscar as Bill Lewellyn
- Martin Cichy as Hank
- Bob Reeves as Floyd Griswell
- James Pierce as henchman
- Robert Kelly as henchman

== Production ==
The Lightning Express was based on "Whispering Smith Speaks" by Frank H. Spearman. Released by Universal on June 3, 1930, it was a remake of Whispering Smith Rides (1927).

== Chapter titles ==
1. A Shot in the Dark
2. A Scream of Terror
3. Dangerous Rails
4. The Death Trap
5. Tower of Terror
6. A Call for Help
7. The Runaway Freight
8. The Showdown
9. The Secret Survey
10. Cleared Tracks

_{Source:}

== See also ==
- List of film serials by year
- List of film serials by studio

| Preceded by The Jade Box (1930) | Universal Serial; The Lightning Express (1930) | Succeeded by Terry of the Times (1930) |
