= Terry of the Times =

1930 film

- Directed by: Henry MacRae
- Written by: Hal Hodes
- Starring: Reed Howes; Lotus Thompson; Sheldon Lewis; John Oscar; William T. Hayes; Mary Grant; Norman Thomson; Kingsley Benedict
- Music by: Sam Perry
- Distributed by: Universal Pictures
- Release date: July 17, 1930
- Running time: 10 chapters (200 min)
- Country: United States
- Language: English

Terry of the Times is a 1930 American Universal film serial. It was the 73rd of the 137 serials released by the studio and the 5th to include sound elements. The serial was the last of Universal's part-sound serials, which were mostly silent productions with an occasional recorded sound sequence. In this case, the serial had pre-recorded music and sound effects, but no audible dialogue. The next serial released by the studio, The Indians are Coming, was their first all-sound production. Terry of the Times is considered to be a lost film.

== Premise ==
Terry (Reed Howes) must marry before a certain date in order to inherit The New York Times. Working against him are his uncle Macy (Sheldon Lewis) and mysterious villains The Mystic Mendicants.

== Cast ==
- Reed Howes as Terry
- Lotus Thompson as Eileen
- Sheldon Lewis as Macy
- John Oscar as Rastus
- William T. Hayes as Patch Dugan
- Mary Grant as a Moll
- Norman Thomson as a Blind Man
- Kingsley Benedict as a Hunchback

== Chapter titles ==
1. The Mystic Mendicants
2. The Fatal 30!
3. Death's Highway
4. Eyes of Evil
5. Prowlers of the Night
6. The Stolen Bride
7. A Doorway of Death
8. A Trail of Treachery
9. Caught in the Net
10. A Race for Love

_{Source:}

== See also ==
- List of film serials
- List of film serials by studio

| Preceded by The Lightning Express (1930) | Universal Serial; Terry of the Times (1930) | Succeeded by The Indians are Coming (1930) |
