= The Gentleman from Arizona =

- Theatrical release poster
- Directed by: Earl Haley
- Screenplay by: Earl Haley; Jack O'Donnell
- Produced by: Charles E. Goetz
- Starring: John 'Dusty' King; J. Farrell MacDonald; Joan Barclay; Ruth Reece; Craig Reynolds; Nora Lane
- Cinematography: John W. Boyle
- Edited by: Edward Curtiss
- Production company: Golden West Pictures
- Distributed by: Monogram Pictures
- Release date: December 25, 1939
- Running time: 71 minutes
- Country: United States
- Language: English

The Gentleman from Arizona is a 1939 American Western film directed by Earl Haley and written by Earl Haley and Jack O'Donnell. The film stars John 'Dusty' King, J. Farrell MacDonald, Joan Barclay, Ruth Reece, Craig Reynolds and Nora Lane. The film was released on December 25, 1939, by Monogram Pictures.

== Cast ==
- John 'Dusty' King as Pokey Sanders
- J. Farrell MacDonald as Wild Bill Coburn
- Joan Barclay as Georgia Coburn
- Ruth Reece as Juanita Coburn
- Craig Reynolds as 'Van' Van Wyck
- Nora Lane as Martha
- Doc Pardee as Doc Pardee
- Ross Santee as Ross
- Adrianna Galvez as Senorita Adrianna
- Johnnie Morris as Pee Wee
- Sherry Hall as The Gimp
