= Kenneth Harlan =

American actor (1895–1967)

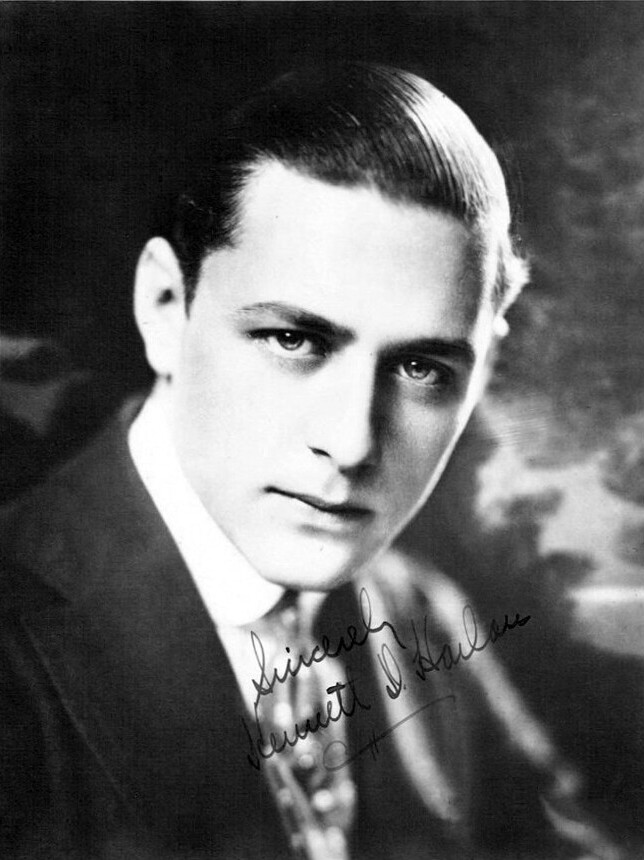
- Harlan in 1918
- Born: Kenneth Daniel Harlan; July 26, 1895; Boston, Massachusetts, U.S.
- Died: March 6, 1967 (aged 71); Sacramento, California, U.S.
- Resting place: Hollywood Forever Cemetery
- Education: Fordham University
- Occupation: Actor
- Years active: 1916–1963
- Spouses: Salome Sanborn (m. 1915; div. 1920) Florence Hart (m. 1920; div. 1922) Marie Prevost (m. 1924; div. 1929) Doris Hilda Booth (m. 1930; div. 1931) Phyllis McClure (m. 1932; div. 1934) Helen Spetner (m. 1934; div. 1946) Helene Stanton (m. 1949; div. 1953) Rhea Walker (m. 1957; div. 1959) Rosemarie Gonsalves Mirjanian (m. 1963)
- Children: 1
- Parent(s): George W. Harlan; Rita W. Harlan
- Relatives: Otis Harlan (uncle)

Kenneth Daniel Harlan (July 26, 1895 – March 6, 1967) was a popular American actor during the silent film era, playing mostly romantic leads or adventurer roles. His career extended into the sound film era, but during that span he rarely commanded leading-man roles, and became mostly a supporting or character actor.

== Early life ==
Harlan was born in Boston, Massachusetts, the son of George W. Harlan (brother of actor, Otis Harlan) and actress Rita W. Harlan (born Sarah Wolff). He was a graduate of Saint Francis High School in Brooklyn, New York City, and Fordham University in the Bronx.

== Career ==
At age seven, Harlan began acting on stage and working in vaudeville. He spent much of 1916 touring with a company of dancers that headlined future Ziegfeld performer Evan-Burrows Fontaine. His career spanned 25 years and included 200 features and serials, Harlan first entered the motion picture world in 1916 as the leading man under D.W. Griffith. Harlan later played with Constance Talmadge, Lois Weber, Mary Pickford, Katherine MacDonald, Anna May Wong, and others. Harlan was skilled at drama and comedy, and made several westerns. Harlan had the leading role in two film serials, Finger Prints (1931) and Danger Island (1931).

He made a smooth transition to talkies, even singing in a few films, but his film roles remained minor throughout his later career. Harlan worked until the 1940s and retired in 1963.

== Personal life and death ==
Harlan was married nine times, including a marriage to silent screen star Marie Prevost. His seventh wife was actress-singer Helene Stanton, whom he married in 1949 and divorced four years later.

Harlan, who was a nephew of actor and comedian Otis Harlan, died of an acute aneurysm in 1967 in Sacramento, California. He was 71.

== Complete filmography ==
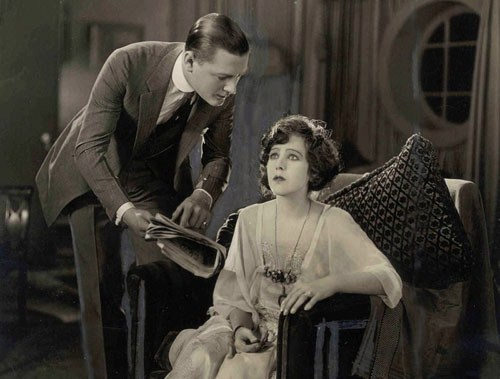
Harlan and Jewel Carmen in Nobody, 1921

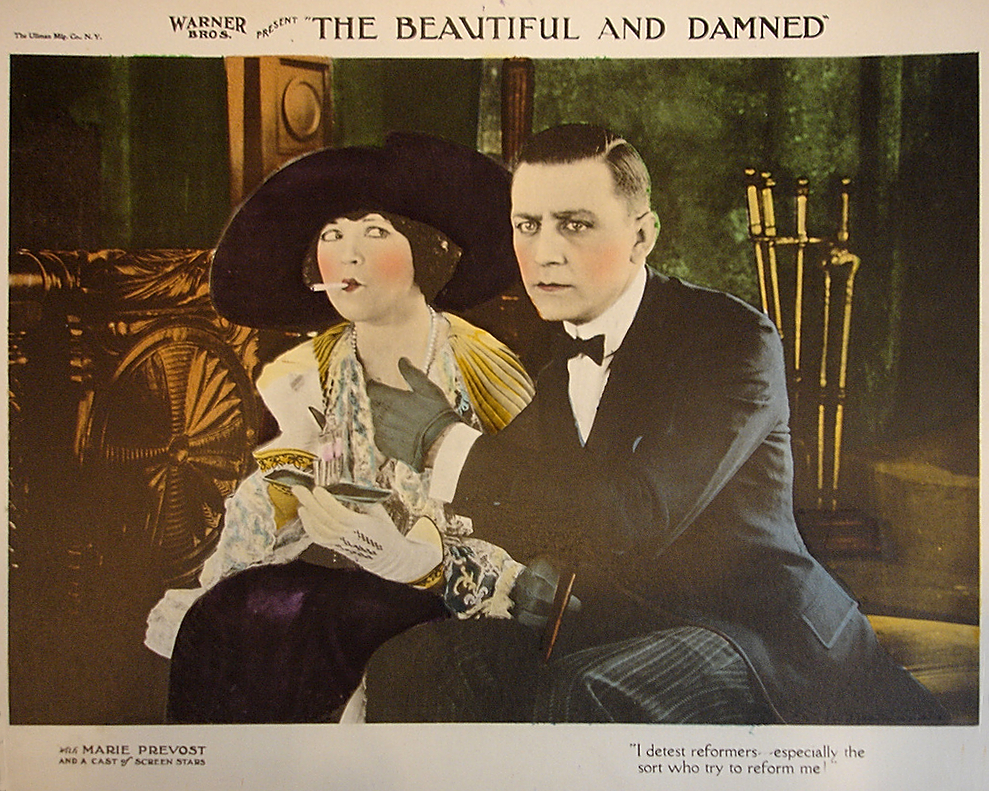
Harlan and Marie Prevost in The Beautiful and Dammed 1922

- Betsy's Burglar (1917) - Harry Brent
- Cheerful Givers (1917) - Horace Gray
- The Flame of the Yukon (1917) - George Fowler
- The Price of a Good Time (1917) - Preston Winfield
- The Lash of Power (1917) - John Rand
- My Unmarried Wife (1918) - Phillip Smith
- A Man's Man (1918) - Billy Geary
- The Wife He Bought (1918) - Steele Valiant
- The Wine Girl (1918) - Frank Harris
- The Marriage Lie (1918) - Douglas Seward
- The Model's Confession (1918) - Billy Ravensworth
- Midnight Madness (1918) - Prentice Tiller
- Her Body in Bond (1918) - Joe Blondin / Pierrot
- Bread (1918) - Dick Frothingham
- The Law That Divides (1918) - Howard Murray
- The Microbe (1919) - DeWitt Spense
- The Hoodlum (1919) - William Turner
- The Trembling Hour (1919) - Major Ralph Dunstan
- The Turning Point (1920) - Jack Rivett
- Dollars and Sense (1920) - David Rogers
- The Penalty (1920) - Dr. Wilmot Allen
- Going Some (1920) - Donald Keap
- Love, Honor and Obey (1920) - Stuart Emmett
- Dangerous Business (1920) - Clarence Brooks
- Mama's Affair (1921) - Dr. Harmon
- Lessons in Love (1921) - John Warren
- Nobody (1921) - Tom Smith
- The Barricade (1921) - Robert Brennon
- Woman's Place (1921) - Jim Bradley
- Dawn of the East (1921) - Roger Strong
- Received Payment (1922) - Cary Grant
- Polly of the Follies (1922) - Bob Jones
- The Primitive Lover (1922) - Donald Wales
- I Am the Law (1922) - Cpl. Bob Fitzgerald
- The Married Flapper (1922) - Bill Billings
- The World's a Stage (1922) - Wallace Foster
- The Toll of the Sea (1922) - Allen Carver
- Thorns and Orange Blossoms (1922) - Alan Randolph
- The Beautiful and Damned (1922) - Anthony
- Little Church Around the Corner (1923) - David Graham
- The Girl Who Came Back (1923) - Martin Norries
- Temporary Marriage (1923) - Robert Belmar
- East Side - West Side (1923) - Duncan Van Norman
- The Virginian (1923) - The Virginian
- April Showers (1923) - Danny O'Rourke
- The Broken Wing (1923) - Philip Marvin
- Poisoned Paradise: The Forbidden Story of Monte Carlo (1924) - Hugh Kildair / Gilbert Kildair
- The Virgin (1924) - David Kent
- The Man Without a Heart (1924) - Rufus Asher
- Butterfly (1924) - Craig Spaulding
- White Man (1924) - White Man
- For Another Woman (1924)
- On the Stroke of Three (1924) - Judson Forrest
- Two Shall Be Born (1924) - Brian Kelly
- Learning to Love (1925) - (uncredited)
- The Re-Creation of Brian Kent (1925) - Brian Kent
- The Crowded Hour (1925) - Billy Laidlaw
- Drusilla with a Million (1925) - Colin Arnold
- The Marriage Whirl (1925) - Arthur Carleton
- Ranger of the Big Pines (1925) - Ross Cavanagh
- Bobbed Hair (1925) - David Lacy
- Soiled (1925) - Jimmie York
- The Golden Strain (1925) - Milt Mulford Jr
- The Fighting Edge (1926) - Juan de Dios O'Rourke
- The King of the Turf (1926) - John Doe Smith
- The Sap (1926) - Barry Weston
- The Virgin Wife (1926) - Dr. Everett Webb
- The Ice Flood (1926) - Jack De Quincey
- Twinkletoes (1926) - Chuck Lightfoot
- Easy Pickings (1927) - Peter Van Horne
- Stage Kisses (1927) - Donald Hampton
- Cheating Cheaters (1927) - Tom Palmer
- Streets of Shanghai (1927) - Sergeant Lee
- Wilful Youth (1927) - Jack Compton
- Midnight Rose (1928) - Tim Regan
- United States Smith (1928) - Cpl. Jim Sharkey
- Code of the Air (1928) - Blair Thompson
- Man, Woman and Wife (1929) - Bill / Jack Mason
- Paradise Island (1930) - Jim Thorne
- Under Montana Skies (1930) - Clay Conning
- Women Men Marry (1931) - Fred Moulton
- Finger Prints (1931, Serial) - Gary Gordon
- Air Police (1931) - Lt. Jerry Doyle
- Danger Island (1931, Serial) - Captain Harry Drake
- The Shadow of the Eagle (1932) - Ward
- The Widow in Scarlet (1932) - Peter Lawton-Bond
- Wanderer of the Wasteland (1935) - Bob
- Cappy Ricks Returns (1935) - Matt Peasley
- Man Hunt (1936) - Jim Davis
- Song of the Saddle (1936) - Marshal Bill Graves
- The Walking Dead (1936) - Stephen Martin
- San Francisco (1936) - 'Chick'
- Public Enemy's Wife (1936) - G-Man
- China Clipper (1936) - Department of Commerce Inspector
- The Case of the Velvet Claws (1936) - Peter Milnor
- They Met in a Taxi (1936) - Mr. Andrews
- Easy to Take (1936) - Judge Allen (uncredited)
- The Accusing Finger (1936) - Police Surgeon (uncredited)
- Hideaway Girl (1936) - Lead steward
- Flying Hostess (1936) - 1st Detective
- Trail Dust (1936) - Bowman
- Penrod and Sam (1937) - Real G-Man
- A Million to One (1937) - William Stevens
- Marked Woman (1937) - Eddie, a Sugar Daddy
- Gunsmoke Ranch (1937) - Phineas T. Flagg
- The Go Getter (1937) - (scenes deleted)
- San Quentin (1937) - Foreman (scenes deleted)
- Kid Galahad (1937) - Reporter (uncredited)
- Blazing Sixes (1937) - Major Taylor
- Topper (1937) - Hotel Manager (uncredited)
- Paradise Isle (1937) - Johnson
- Wine, Women and Horses (1937) - Jed Bright
- Renfrew of the Royal Mounted (1937) - Roger 'Angel' Carroll
- Something to Sing About (1937) - Transportation Manager (uncredited)
- The Shadow Strikes (1937) - Captain Breen
- Submarine D-1 (1937) - Mr. Kelsey - Salvage Officer (uncredited)
- The Mysterious Pilot (1937) - Carter Snowden
- Wallaby Jim of the Islands (1937) - Michael Corell, Richter Henchman
- Tim Tyler's Luck (1937, Serial) - Spencer, Trader [Chs. 2-3] (uncredited)
- Saleslady (1938) - Bigelow
- Swing It, Sailor! (1938) - First Officer
- Blondes at Work (1938) - Marvin Spencer
- Merrily We Live (1938) - Mr. Remington (uncredited)
- Accidents Will Happen (1938) - Attorney Elmer Ross
- Under Western Stars (1938) - Richards
- Whirlwind Horseman (1938) - John Harper
- Held for Ransom (1938) - McBride
- Pride of the West (1938) - Caldwell - Banker
- The Wages of Sin (1938) - Laundry Owner
- Smashing the Rackets (1938) - Angry Businessman (uncredited)
- Sunset Trail (1938) - John Marsh
- Law of the Texan (1938) - Allen Spencer
- The Headleys at Home (1938) - Smooth Adair
- The Little Adventuress (1938) - Tom Eagan
- The Duke of West Point (1938) - Varsity Football Coach
- On Trial (1939) - Mr. John Trumbell - Juror #3
- The Man Who Dared (1939) - Walton, a Henchman (uncredited)
- The Flying Irishman (1939) - Man at New York Airport (uncredited)
- Buck Rogers (1939, Serial) - Reporter at Wade's Lab (uncredited)
- Torchy Runs for Mayor (1939) - Stan - Star Advertising Manager (uncredited)
- The Oregon Trail (1939, Serial) - General Terry [Ch. 1] (uncredited)
- Port of Hate (1939) - Bob Randall
- Range War (1939) - Charley Higgins
- Dick Tracy's G-Men (1939, Serial) - Clive Anderson
- Heroes in Blue (1939) - Miller (uncredited)
- The Night of Nights (1939) - Actor (uncredited)
- The Green Hornet (1940, Serial) - Charles Roberts [Ch. 7] (uncredited)
- Santa Fe Marshal (1940) - Blake - Henchman
- Murder in the Air (1940) - Commander Wayne
- Millionaires in Prison (1940) - Jerry Connell (uncredited)
- Doomed to Die (1940) - Ludlow
- Prairie Schooners (1940) - Dalton Stull
- Junior G-Men (1940, Serial) - Dyer, Factory Gate Guard [Ch. 9] (uncredited)
- A Little Bit of Heaven (1940) - Uncle Burt
- Mysterious Doctor Satan (1940, Serial) - Capt. Lathrop [Chs. 1-2] (uncredited)
- Pride of the Bowery (1940) - Police Captain Jim White
- The Case of the Black Parrot (1940) - Ship's Captain (uncredited)
- Secret Evidence (1941) - Frank Billings
- Meet John Doe (1941) - Publicity Man (uncredited)
- Sky Raiders (1941, Serial) - Blane [Ch. 2] (uncredited)
- Million Dollar Baby (1941) - Reporter (uncredited)
- Paper Bullets (1941) - Jim Adams
- Desperate Cargo (1941) - Capt. Hank MacFarland
- Bullets for O'Hara (1941) - Jim
- Wide Open Town (1941) - Tom Wilson
- King of Dodge City (1941) - Banker Carruthers
- Dangerous Lady (1941) - Det. Dunlap
- Fighting Bill Fargo (1941) - Sheriff Hackett
- Dick Tracy vs. Crime Inc. (1941) - Police Lt. Cosgrove
- Don Winslow of the Navy (1942, Serial) - Capt. Holding [Ch. 1] (uncredited)
- Sleepytime Gal (1942) - Ticket Taker (uncredited)
- Black Dragons (1942) - FBI Chief Colton
- Klondike Fury (1942) - Flight Dispatcher
- The Dawn Express (1942) - Agent Brown
- The Corpse Vanishes (1942) - Editor Keenan
- Perils of the Royal Mounted (1942, Serial) - John Craig - Phony Commissioner [Chs.10-11]
- Juke Girl (1942) - Atlanta Produce Dealer (uncredited)
- Wings for the Eagle (1942) - Supervisor (uncredited)
- Bandit Ranger (1942) - Mark Kenyon
- Deep in the Heart of Texas (1942) - Captain Sneed
- Phantom Killer (1942) - Police Lt. Jim Brady
- Foreign Agent (1942) - George McCall
- You Can't Escape Forever (1942) - Fingerprint Division Lieutenant (uncredited)
- Hitler – Dead or Alive (1942) - Cutler
- The Sundown Kid (1942) - Warden Penrose (uncredited)
- Silent Witness (1943) - Detective Tommy Jackson
- G-Men vs. the Black Dragon (1943, Serial) - Lab Guard / Officer Casey (uncredited)
- You Can't Beat the Law (1943) - First Warden
- Wild Horse Stampede (1943) - Borman
- A Stranger in Town (1943) - Banker in Barbershop (uncredited)
- Daredevils of the West (1943, Serial) - Territorial Commissioner [Ch. 9, 10]
- Girls in Chains (1943) - Police Lt. Jackson (uncredited)
- The Masked Marvel (1943, Serial) - Plant Guard [Ch. 1] / Police Car 7 Driver [Ch. 3]
- The Law Rides Again (1943) - John Hampton
- Melody Parade (1943) - Jedson
- Adventures of the Flying Cadets (1943, Serial) - Baggage Car Clerk [Ch. 2] (uncredited)
- The Underdog (1943) - Eddie Mohr
- Nearly Eighteen (1943) - Sammy Klein (final film role)

Short films

- Foiled Again (1932, Short) - The Hero
- Movie Maniacs (1936, Short) - Leading Man
