= Craig Reynolds (actor) =

American actor (1907–1949)

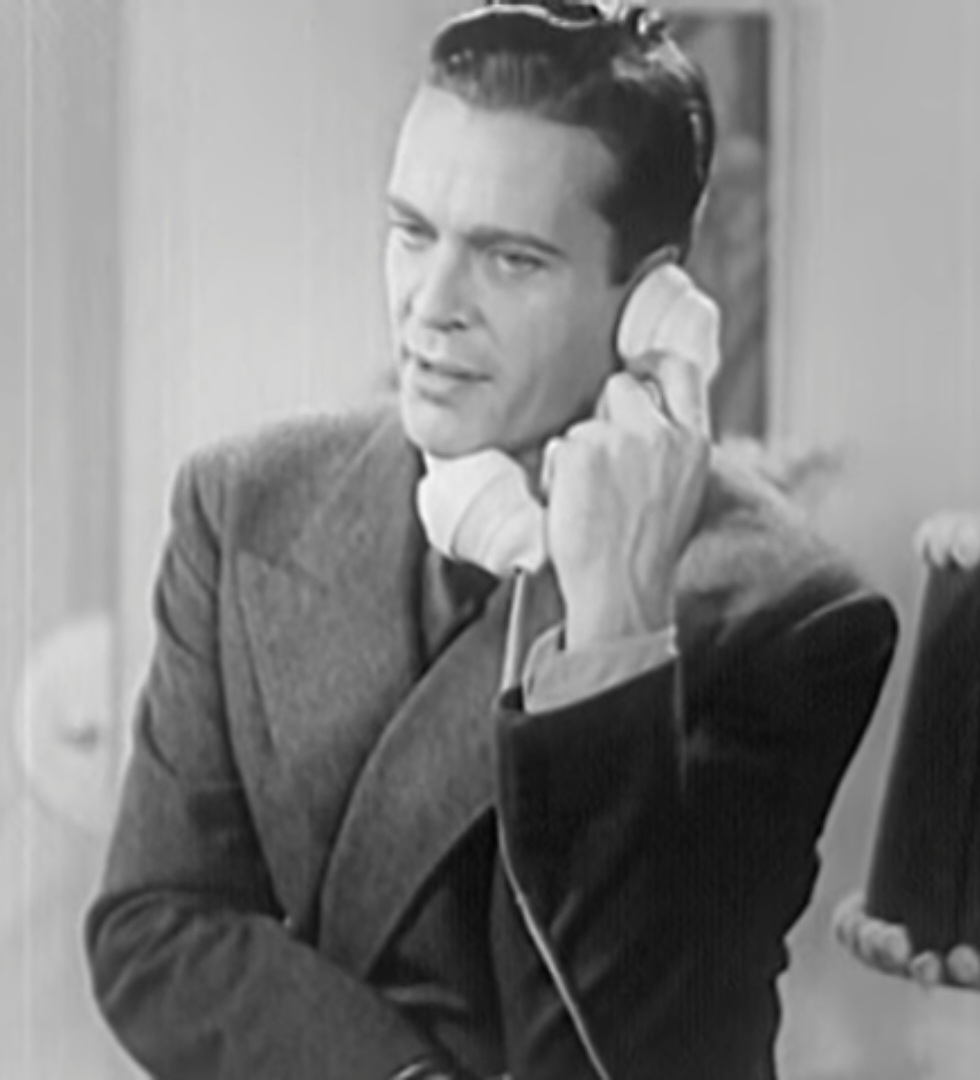
- Reynolds in Slander House (1938)
- Born: Harold Hugh Enfield; July 15, 1907; Anaheim, California, U.S.
- Died: October 22, 1949 (aged 42); Los Angeles, California, U.S.
- Occupation: Actor
- Years active: 1933–1949
- Spouse: Barbara Pepper (m. 1943)

Craig Reynolds (born Harold Hugh Enfield, July 15, 1907 – October 22, 1949) was an American film actor of the 1930s and 1940s.

== Early life and career ==
Reynolds was born in Anaheim, California, in 1907, the son of Leila Maybelle (née Goold) and Oscar Davenport Enfield. Reynolds enjoyed a film career spanning the 1930s and 1940s, although the majority of his roles occurred during the first decade of his career.

In 1933 the actor signed with Universal Pictures, playing supporting roles in features and a Buck Jones serial. During this period he was billed as Hugh Enfield. The serial unit gave him a starring role in the 1934 version of The Perils of Pauline, billing him as Robert Allen.

After his tenure with Universal, he appeared in three features for Paramount Pictures in 1935 before being signed by Warner Brothers that same year. Warners rechristened him Craig Reynolds and groomed him as a rising star. He played second leads and featured roles in "A" pictures, and leads in "B" pictures. It is for these 27 Warner films that Craig Reynolds is best known.

After his Warner contract ran out, Reynolds kept busy freelancing for other studios including Columbia, Republic, Monogram, and PRC. He interrupted his career to enlist in the armed forces during World War II, and he was awarded a Purple Heart, then released from military service. He resumed his career in 1944 and worked in occasional features for the next five years. He died in October 1949, age 42, in an accident while riding a motor scooter in Los Angeles.

== Personal life ==
He married actress Barbara Pepper in 1943, with whom he had two sons, John and Dennis. After his death in 1949, she never remarried.

== Filmography ==
- 1929: Coquette - Young Townsman at Dance (uncredited)
- 1933: The Phantom of the Air - Blade (uncredited)
- 1933: Don't Bet on Love - Reporter (uncredited)
- 1933: Gordon of Ghost City - Henchman Ed (as Hugh Enfield)
- 1933: Saturday's Millions - Football Player (uncredited)
- 1933: Only Yesterday - Hugh (uncredited)
- 1933: The Perils of Pauline - Robert Ward (as Robert Allen)
- 1934: Cross Country Cruise - First Bus Driver (as Hugh Enfield)
- 1934: I'll Tell the World - Aviator (as Hugh Enfield)
- 1934: Let's Be Ritzy - Clerk
- 1934: Millionaire for a Day - Clerk (as Hugh Enfield)
- 1934: Love Birds - Bus Driver
- 1934: Million Dollar Ransom - Eddie (as Hugh Enfield)
- 1935: Rumba - Bromley (uncredited)
- 1935: Four Hours to Kill! - Frank (as Hugh Enfield)
- 1935: Paris in Spring - Alphonse (as Hugh Enfield)
- 1935: The Case of the Lucky Legs - Frank Patton
- 1935: Man of Iron - Mr. Harry Adams
- 1935: Dangerous - Reporter (uncredited)
- 1936: Ceiling Zero - Joe Allen
- 1936: The Preview Murder Mystery - Actor (uncredited)
- 1936: Boulder Dam - Dam Worker (uncredited)
- 1936: Times Square Playboy - Joe Roberts
- 1936: His Best Man - Joe Roberts
- 1936: Treachery Rides the Range - Wade Carter
- 1936: Sons o' Guns - Lieut. Burton
- 1936: The Golden Arrow - Jorgenson
- 1936: Jailbreak - Ken Williams
- 1936: Stage Struck - Gilmore Frost
- 1936: The Voice of Scandal - Rex Marchbanks (movie AKA:Here Comes Carter)
- 1936: The Case of the Black Cat - Frank Oafley
- 1937: Smart Blonde - Tom Carney
- 1937: The Great O'Malley - Motorist Honking Horn
- 1937: Penrod and Sam - Roy 'Dude' Hanson
- 1937: Melody for Two - William 'Bill' Hallam
- 1937: The Go Getter - Sailor on the Macon (uncredited)
- 1937: The Case of the Stuttering Bishop - Gordon Bixler
- 1937: Slim - Gambler
- 1937: The Footloose Heiress - Bruce 'Butch' Baeder
- 1937: Back in Circulation - 'Snoopy' Davis, a Reporter
- 1937: The Great Garrick - M. Janin
- 1937: Under Suspicion - Nelson Dudley
- 1938: Romance Road (Short) - Flood
- 1938: Making the Headlines - Reporter Steve Withers
- 1938: Female Fugitive - Jim Mallory
- 1938: Romance on the Run - Charlie Cooper
- 1938: Gold Mine in the Sky - Larry Cummings
- 1938: Slander House - Pat Fenton
- 1938: I Am a Criminal - Clint Reynolds
- 1939: Navy Secrets - CPO Jimmy Woodford
- 1939: The Mystery of Mr. Wong - Peter Harrison
- 1939: Wall Street Cowboy - Tony McGrath
- 1939: The Gentleman from Arizona - 'Van' Van Wyck
- 1940: The Fatal Hour (1940 film) - Frank Belden Jr.
- 1940: Son of the Navy - Brad Wheeler
- 1940: I Take This Oath - Joe Kelly
- 1944: Nevada - Cash Burridge
- 1945: The Strange Affair of Uncle Harry - John Warren
- 1945: Divorce - Bill Endicott
- 1945: The Lost Weekend - George, M.M.'s Escort (uncredited)
- 1946: Just Before Dawn - Jack Swayne (uncredited)
- 1946: Queen of Burlesque - Joe Nolan
- 1946: My Dog Shep - W. D. Stanfield, Attorney
- 1947: The Fabulous Texan - State Policeman (uncredited)
- 1948: The Man from Colorado - Parry (uncredited) (final film role)
