= Rita W. Harlan =

American actress

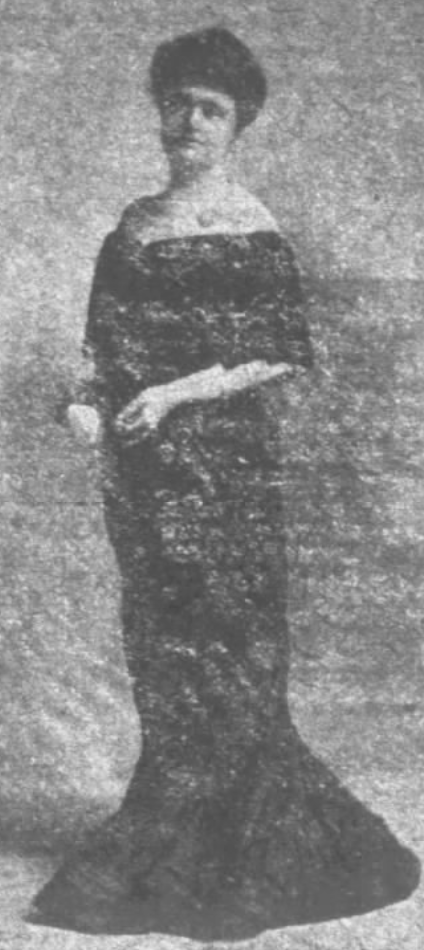
- Rita W. Harlan, from a 1907 newspaper
- Born: Sarah R. Wolff about 1873; St. Thomas, Virgin Islands
- Died: May 31, 1933; Los Angeles, California
- Occupation: Actress
- Children: 3, including Kenneth Harlan
- Relatives: Otis Harlan (brother-in-law); Marie Prevost (daughter-in-law)

Rita W. Harlan (about 1873 – May 31, 1933), born Sarah R. Wolff, was an American actress on stage and in silent film, head of the Rita Harlan Stock Company.

== Career ==
Harlan was head of the touring Rita Harlan Stock Company in 1906 and 1907. Members of the company included Duncan Penwarden, Inda Palmer, and Russian actor Theodore Lorch, who was her co-star in a 1906 production of Dr. Jekyll and Mr. Hyde. Her son Kenneth Harlan was also a member of her company, and sometimes acted opposite her, as her husband, brother, or even as her father. "My mother invariably played the little country girl who faced the perils of a big city," he recalled. She appeared in George M. Cohan's Seven Keys to Baldpate in San Francisco, in a 1915 production starring Cyril Scott.

Harlan moved to Southern California in 1915, and preceded her son into screen roles, appearing in two silent films, Angel Child (1919) and The Way of the Strong (1919, with Anna Q. Nilsson). Also in 1919, she acted in a production of George M. Cohan's The Yankee Prince in Burbank.

In 1930, she served as foreman of the jury in the Los Angeles manslaughter trial of Otto Sanhuber, who shot the husband of his lover, Walburga Oesterreich in 1922.

== Personal life ==
Sarah R. Wolff married George W. Harlan in 1891, in New Jersey. They had three children, Dorothy, Gladys, and Kenneth, before they divorced in 1899. She lived in Hollywood in her later years, and died in 1933, aged 60 years, at her younger daughter's home in Los Angeles.
