= Ranger of the Big Pines =

1925 film

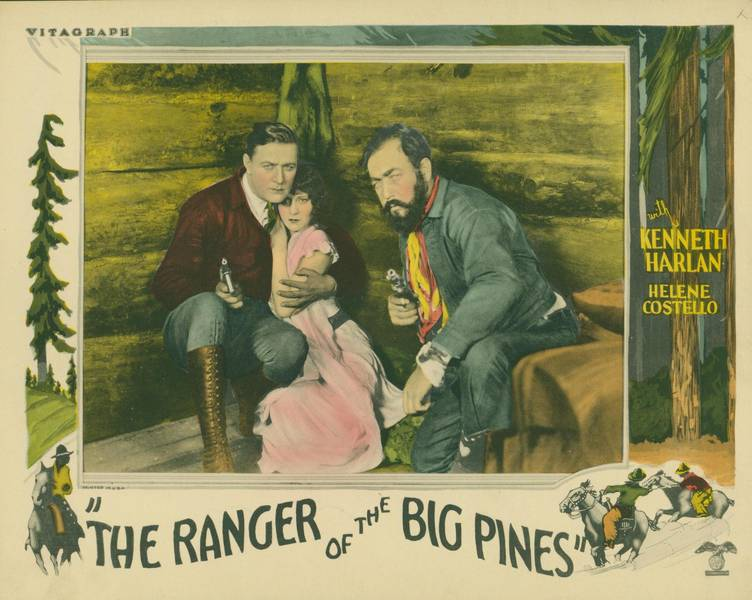
- Directed by: W.S. Van Dyke
- Written by: Hamlin Garland (novel); Louis D. Lighton; Hope Loring
- Starring: Kenneth Harlan; Eugene Pallette; Helene Costello
- Cinematography: Allen Q. Thompson
- Production company: Vitagraph Company of America
- Distributed by: Warner Bros. Pictures
- Release date: July 26, 1925
- Running time: 70 minutes
- Country: United States
- Languages: Silent; English intertitles

Ranger of the Big Pines is a 1925 American silent Western film directed by W.S. Van Dyke and starring Kenneth Harlan, Eugene Pallette and Helene Costello.

== Cast ==
- Kenneth Harlan as Ross Cavanagh
- Eugene Pallette
- Helene Costello as Virginia Weatherford
- Eulalie Jensen as Lize Weatherford
- Will Walling as Sam Gregg
- Lew Harvey as Joe Gregg
- Robert Graves as Redfield
- Alan Hale
- Joan Standing

== Bibliography ==
- Munden, Kenneth White. The American Film Institute Catalog of Motion Pictures Produced in the United States, Part 1. University of California Press, 1997. ISBN 978-0-520-20969-5.
