= Red Barry (comic strip) =

American comic strip by Will Gould

- Cover of the 1989 Fantagraphics collection
- Author: Will Gould
- Current status/schedule: Concluded
- Launch date: March 19, 1934
- End date: July 17, 1938
- Syndicate(s): King Features Syndicate
- Publisher(s): Big Little Book series Fantagraphics Books; IDW Publishing
- Genre: Crime

Red Barry is a detective comic strip created by Will Gould (1911–1984) for King Features. The daily strip about two-fisted undercover cop Barry began Monday, March 19, 1934, as one of several strips introduced to compete with Dick Tracy by Chester Gould (no relation). A Sunday strip was added on February 3, 1935. The daily strip ran for three years, until August 14, 1937, and the Sunday page ended almost a year later, on July 17, 1938.

== Background ==
In 1929, Gould began as a sports cartoonist for the Bronx Home News where he also drew the comic strip Felix O'Fan. For the New York Graphic he created Asparagus Tipps (1926–1929). Relocating to California in 1930, he freelanced to several syndicates before creating Red Barry, which he wrote and drew from 1934 to 1938. Gould drew Red Barry in a crisp, clean line style. His assistant on the strip was Walter Frehm. Contract disputes between Gould and King Features brought Red Barry to an end in 1939.

New York Evening Graphic journalist Frank Mallen wrote:

Those of us who were acquainted with Will Gould, popular sports cartoonist on the Graphic in its early days, were never able to understand why he abandoned the drawing board, after achieving considerable success at it, to disappear in Hollywood. He had shown promise of becoming one of the greatest artists in the business and had a tremendous following. Gould left the Graphic to join King Features. There he drew a daily sports panel and a detective comic strip serial called Red Barry, which were widely distributed. Then suddenly he chucked it all.

"I got bored too easily," was his recent explanation, "especially when I discovered California and that delightful narcotic known as golf." He now works for TV and radio.

== Characters and story ==
Will Gould's Red Barry (May 5, 1935)

In Toonopedia, comics historian Don Markstein described the characters:

Red was an undercover man for the cops. With only one man on the force, his old friend Inspector Scott, absolutely sure what side he was truly on, Red undertook the most dangerous possible missions — infiltrating the ranks of deadly gangsters while seldom able to count on the support of the police. At first Red worked alone, but he later picked up a kid named Ouchy Mugouchy. Eventually, Ouchy and a couple of friends, collectively known as The Terrific Three, became major stars.

Leaving Red Barry, Gould became the cartoon editor of Writer's Forum, and he drew the series The Schnoox. Gould left comics in 1940 for screenwriting and work as a radio reporter. He scripted episodes of Racket Squad and Lassie.

== Film ==
Buster Crabbe portrayed Red Barry in "13 cyclonic hair-raising chapters" of the 1938 serial, Red Barry adapted from the comic strip. It was the third of five serials from Universal starring Buster Crabbe. The actor William Gould (1886–1969) who portrayed the Commissioner in the serial was not the Will Gould who created Red Barry. In the serial story, Barry attempts to recover two million dollars of stolen bonds intended for Allied war planes while international spies and ruthless underworld gangsters fight to acquire the bonds. The DVD of the serial from Hermitage Hill Media includes comic strip excerpts.

== Books ==
After Red Barry, Ace Detective was published as a 1935 Little Big Book, it was praised by critic Anthony Boucher, who stated that Red Barry was "vigorously in the Hammett tradition." Rick Marschall edited Will Gould's Red Barry (1989) for Fantagraphics Books. The collection features a foreword by Walter Frehm. Bill Spicer's Graphic Story Magazine #11 (Summer 1970) was a full issue covering Red Barry in depth, including a lengthy interview with Will Gould.

In November 2016, IDW Publishing published Red Barry Undercover Man, Vol. 1 under their Library of American Comics imprint. The second and final volume has yet to be announced.

== Sources ==
Spicer, Bill. "Will Gould," Graphic Story Magazine #11 (Summer 1970).
