= Gordon of Ghost City =

1933 film

- Theatrical film poster
- Directed by: Ray Taylor
- Written by: Ella O'Neill; George H. Plympton; Basil Dickey; Het Mannheim; Harry O. Hoyt
- Distributed by: Universal Pictures
- Release date: 1933
- Running time: 12 chapters (220 minutes)
- Country: United States
- Language: English

Gordon of Ghost City is a 1933 Pre-Code Universal movie serial based on the novel Oh, Promise Me! by Peter B. Kyne, directed by Ray Taylor and starring Buck Jones and Madge Bellamy.

== Plot ==
Buck Gordon is hired to discover who has been rustling a rancher's cattle, while simultaneously trying to protect a young girl (Madge Bellamy) and her prospector grandfather (Tom Ricketts) from having their newly discovered gold mine stolen from them by a mystery villain.

== Cast ==
- Buck Jones as Buck Gordon
- Madge Bellamy as Mary Gray
- Walter Miller as Rance Radigan
- Tom Ricketts as Amos Gray
- William Desmond as John Mulford
- Francis Ford as The Mystery Man
- Edmund Cobb as Cowhand Scotty
- Craig Reynolds as Henchman Ed (as Hugh Enfield)
- Bud Osborne as Henchman Hank (as Bud Osbourne)
- Ethan Laidlaw as Henchman Pete

== Chapter titles ==
1. A Lone Hand
2. The Stampede
3. Trapped
4. The Man of Mystery
5. Riding for Life
6. Blazing Prairies
7. Entombed in the Tunnel
8. The Thundering Herd
9. Flames of Fury
10. Swimming in the Torrent
11. A Wild Ride
12. Mystery of Ghost City

_{Source:}

== Home Entertainment ==
On May 12, 2020, the entire serial was released on Region 1 DVD and Blu-Ray by VCI Entertainment. Universal licensed the rights and granted them access to the original 35mm elements.

== See also ==
- List of film serials by year
- List of film serials by studio

Preceded by The Phantom of the Air (1933)	Universal Serial; Gordon of Ghost City (1933)	Succeeded by The Perils of Pauline (1933)
