= Danger Island (serial) =

1931 American film

- Directed by: Ray Taylor
- Written by: Henry MacRae, Ella O'Neill, Basil Dickey, George H. Plympton
- Starring: Kenneth Harlan; Lucile Brown; Andy Devine
- Distributed by: Universal Pictures
- Release date: August 24, 1931 (U.S.)
- Running time: 12 chapters (220 minutes)
- Country: United States
- Language: English

Danger Island (1931) is an American Universal pre-Code film serial. It is considered to be a lost film. Kenneth Harlan played Captain Drake (the hero), and Lucile Brown played heroine Bonnie Adams. The film also co-starred Andy Devine.

== Plot ==
Bonnie Adams is told by her father, Professor Adams, on his death bed of his discovery of a radium deposit on an island off the coast of Africa. Ben Arnold and his girlfriend Aileen want the radium for themselves and befriend Bonnie for that purpose. The captain of the boat taking them to their destination, Harry Drake, falls in love with Bonnie en route.

== Cast ==
- Kenneth Harlan as Harry Drake
- Lucile Browne as Bonnie Adams
- Tom Ricketts as Professor Adams
- Walter Miller as Ben Arnold
- William L. Thorne as Bull Black
- Beulah Hutton as Aileen Calindos
- Andy Devine as Briney
- George Regas as Lascara
- Everett Brown as Cebu

== Chapter titles ==
1. The Coast of Peril
2. Death Rides the Storm
3. Demons of the Pool
4. Devil Worshippers
5. Mutiny
6. The Cat Creeps
7. The Drums of Doom
8. Human Sacrifice
9. The Devil Bird
10. Captured For Sacrifice
11. The Lion's Lair
12. Fire God's vengeance

_{Source:}

== See also ==
- List of film serials by year
- List of film serials by studio

Preceded by Heroes of the Flames (1931)	Universal Serial; Danger Island (1931)	Succeeded by Battling with Buffalo Bill (1931)
