= Flash Gordon (serial) =

1936 film serial

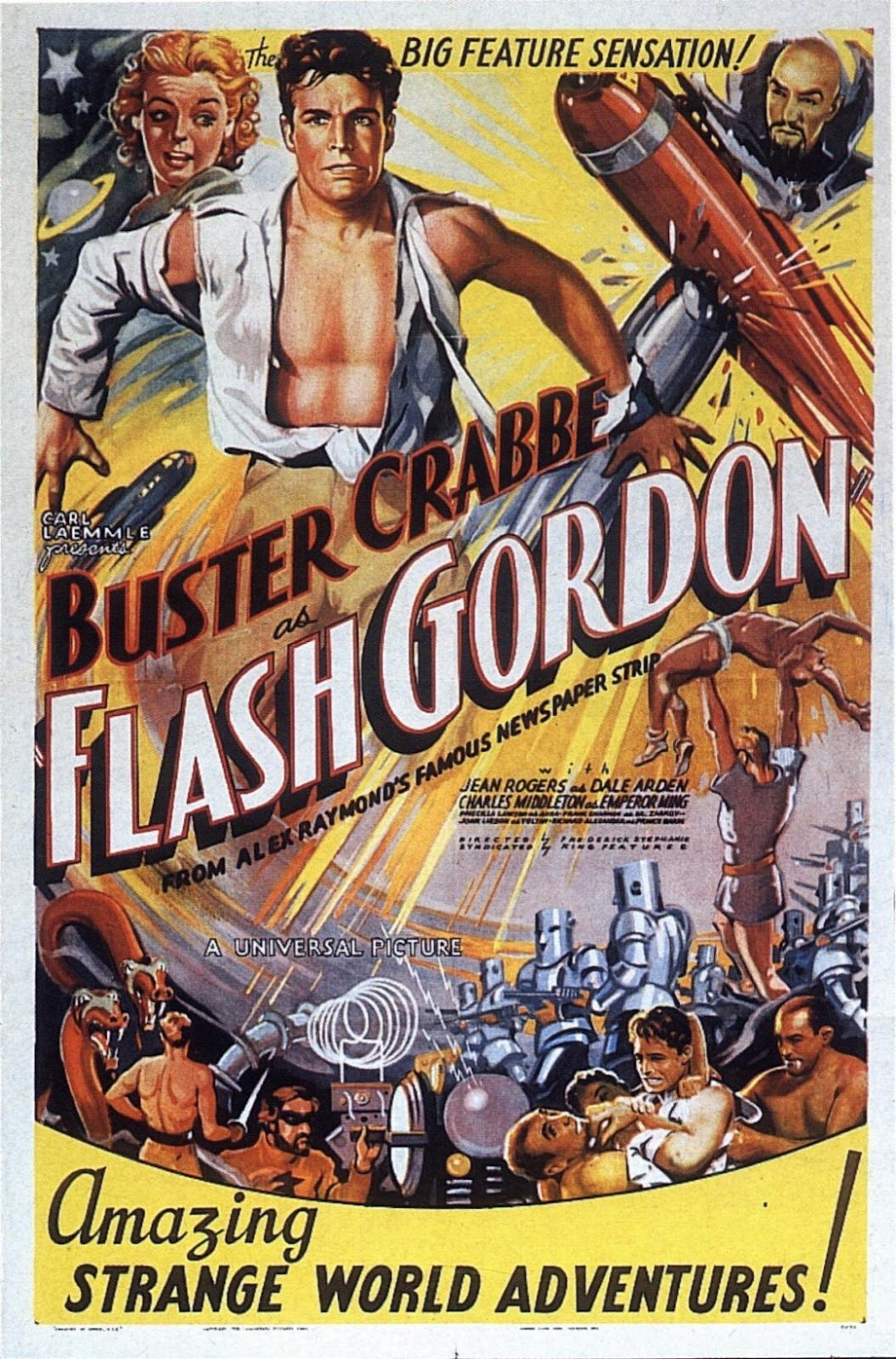
- Poster for 1936 serial (note tagline), reissued as Rocketship in 1949
- Directed by: Frederick Stephani
- Screenplay by: Frederick Stephani; Ella O'Neill; George H. Plympton (as George Plympton); Basil Dickey
- Based on: Flash Gordon by Alex Raymond
- Produced by: Henry MacRae
- Starring: Buster Crabbe; Jean Rogers; Charles B. Middleton; Priscilla Lawson; Frank Shannon
- Cinematography: Jerome Ash; Richard Fryer
- Edited by: Saul A. Goodkind; Louis Sackin; Alvin Todd; Edward Todd
- Production companies: Universal Pictures; King Features Syndicate
- Distributed by: Universal Pictures
- Release date: April 6, 1936
- Running time: 245 minutes (13 episodes)
- Country: United States
- Language: English
- Budget: $350,000

Flash Gordon is a 1936 science-fiction adventure serial film. Presented in 13 chapters, it is the first screen adventure for Flash Gordon, the comic-strip character created by Alex Raymond in 1934. It presents the story of Gordon's visit to the planet Mongo and his encounters with the evil Emperor Ming the Merciless. Buster Crabbe, Jean Rogers, Charles Middleton, Priscilla Lawson and Frank Shannon portray the film's central characters. In 1996, Flash Gordon was selected for preservation in the United States National Film Registry by the Library of Congress as being "culturally, historically, or aesthetically significant".

== Plot ==
Two scientists, Professors Gordon and Hensley, confirm that the planet Mongo is on a collision course with Earth, meaning humanity will be wiped out. As the world panics, Gordon's son Flash flies home from college to be with his father at the end. His plane is hit by atmospheric disturbance, forcing an evacuation. Flash notices a fellow passenger, Dale Arden, is too frightened to make the jump, so he parachutes down with her. They land near a rocket ship owned by Dr. Zarkov. Zarkov believes Mongo is being piloted by an alien intelligence, and that Earth can be saved if they fly to Mongo and convince the inhabitants to change course, but his colleagues think his theories are mad, so he has no crew. Flash and Dale are willing to take this long shot to save mankind, so they fly with Zarkov to Mongo. Shortly after landing, they are arrested by Officer Torch, who brings them before Emperor Ming.

Ming confirms that he controls Mongo's course, but he has no intention of colliding with Earth; rather, he intends to destroy Earth with the advanced weaponry at his disposal. He puts Zarkov to work in his laboratory and, intrigued by Dale's beauty, proposes to make her his bride. Flash intervenes in her defense, so Ming has him thrown into his arena. Impressed by Flash, Ming's daughter, Princess Aura, demands that he be her possession if he survives. Ming agrees, but as Flash triumphs over his bestial adversaries, Ming drops him into a pit. To save Flash, Aura joins him, so Ming opens up a safety net underneath them.

Ming's palace is attacked by the Lion Men in a fleet of gyroships. Fearing Dale and Zarkov may be killed in the attack, Flash battles the Lion Men in one of Ming's ships, and defeats their leader, Prince Thun. Realizing they have a common enemy in Ming, Flash and Thun join forces to rescue Dale and Zarkov. In their struggles against Ming and his vassals, Flash and his friends battle many strange beings and ally with Prince Barin, the son of Ming's predecessor, who Ming murdered. Aura plays both sides, trying to prevent Flash from being killed while secretly working to separate him from her competition, Dale.

Flash, Thun, Dale, Zarkov, Barin, and Aura are captured by King Vultan of the Hawk Men. Aura persuades Dale to pretend she loves Vultan so that he will not have Flash killed, then urges Flash to renounce Dale, offering to make him king. Flash respectfully turns Aura down, saying that while he is grateful to her for saving his life, he belongs on Earth and intends to return there with Dale. Zarkov discovers a new, more reliable technology for keeping the Hawk Men's Sky City aloft, and bargains for his friends' freedom with it. Vultan agrees. Unwilling to let Flash escape, Ming invokes a Tournament of Death; the survivor will have freedom, a kingdom of his own, and a bride of his choice.

Flash triumphs in the tournament, and Ming hosts a celebration at his palace, while secretly ordering his men to execute Flash. To save him, Zarkov uses his latest invention to turn Flash invisible. Flash terrorizes Ming and his men with his new invisibility. Dale hides in the catacombs from Ming's men, and Aura employs a tigron to hunt her. Though his invisibility has worn off, Flash overcomes the tigron to save Dale. Barin persuades Aura to stop trying to kill Dale.

Ming's men capture Flash and his friends, but Thun leads another assault on Ming's palace. As Flash helps them overcome Ming's men, Ming flees into the temple of the god Tao and disappears. His High Priest says that no one ever returns from the temple, so Aura becomes the new ruler.

After bidding farewell to their friends, Flash, Dale, and Zarkov board Zarkov's rocket ship to return home. En route, Barin, Aura, Vultan and Thun radio to warn them that the High Priest boasted of smuggling a bomb aboard their ship. Flash finds the bomb and jettisons it just in time. As the rocket ship brings them back to Earth, Flash and Dale kiss.

== Cast ==
- Buster Crabbe as Flash Gordon
- Charles B. Middleton as Ming the Merciless
- Jean Rogers as Dale Arden
- Priscilla Lawson as Princess Aura
- Frank Shannon as Dr. Alexis Zarkov
- Richard Alexander as Prince Barin
- Jack Lipson as King Vultan
- Theodore Lorch as Second High Priest
- James Pierce as Prince Thun
- Duke York as King Kala
- Earl Askam as Officer Torch
- Lon Poff as First High Priest (uncredited)
- Richard Tucker as Professor Gordon
- George Cleveland as Professor Hensley
- Muriel Goodspeed as Zona
- Eddie Parker served as a stand-in and stunt double for Buster Crabbe.
- Crash Corrigan, who would later star in other serials, wore a modified gorilla suit to portray the "orangopoid" seen in chapters 8 and 9.
- Glenn Strange in uncredited roles wore the "Gocko" lobster-clawed dragon costume and also appears as one of Ming's soldiers.

== Production ==
According to Harmon and Glut, Flash Gordon had a budget of over a million dollars. Stedman, however, writes that it was "reportedly" US$350,000 (equivalent to $8.1 million in 2025).

Many props and other elements in the film were recycled from earlier Universal productions. The watchtower sets used in Frankenstein (1931) appear again as several interiors within Ming's palace. One of the large Egyptian statues seen in The Mummy (1932) is the idol of the Great God Tao. The laboratory set and a shot of the Moon rushing past Zarkov's returning rocket ship from space are from The Invisible Ray (1936). Zarkov's rocket ship and scenes of dancers swarming over a gigantic idol were reused from Just Imagine (1930). Ming's attack on Earth is footage from old silent newsreels, and an entire dance segment is from The Midnight Sun (1927), while some of the laboratory equipment came from Bride of Frankenstein (1935).

The music was also recycled from several other films, notably Bride of Frankenstein, Bombay Mail, The Black Cat (both 1934), Werewolf of London (1935), and The Invisible Man (1933).

Crabbe had his hair dyed blond to appear more like the comic-strip Flash Gordon. He was reportedly very self-conscious about this and kept his hat on in public at all times, even with women present. He did not like men whistling at him. Jean Rogers also had her hair dyed blonde prior to production, "apparently to capitalize on the popularity of Jean Harlow". Brunette was the natural hair color for both actors. Richard Alexander helped to design his own costume, which included a leather chest plate painted gold.

According to the reference The Great Movie Serials: Their Sound and Fury (1973) by Jim Harmon and Donald Glut, Ming's makeup and costuming were designed to resemble Fu Manchu, a supervillain popularized in earlier Hollywood films, such as The Mysterious Dr. Fu Manchu, and in a series of novels, starting with The Mystery of Dr. Fu-Manchu, which was first published in England in 1913.

Exterior shots, such as the Earth crew's first steps on Mongo, were filmed at Bronson Canyon.

== Release and reception ==
Universal hoped to regain an adult audience for serials with the release of Flash Gordon and by presenting it in many of the top or "A-level" theaters in large cities across the United States. Multiple newspapers in 1936, including some not even carrying the Flash Gordon comic strip, featured half- and three-quarter-page stories about the film as well as copies of Raymond's drawings and publicity stills that highlighted characters and chapter settings.

The film was the first outright science-fiction serial, although earlier serials had contained science-fiction elements such as gadgets. Six of the fourteen serials released within five years of Flash Gordon were science fiction.

For syndication to television in the 1950s, the serial was renamed Space Soldiers, so as not to be confused with the newly made, also syndicated television series, Flash Gordon.

The serial film was also edited into a 72-minute feature version in 1936, which was only exhibited abroad, until being released in the US in 1949 as Rocket Ship by Sherman S. Krellberg's Filmcraft Pictures.

A different feature version of the serial, at 90 minutes, was sold directly to television in 1966 under the title Spaceship to the Unknown.

Flash Gordon was Universal's second-highest-grossing film of 1936, after Three Smart Girls, a musical starring Deanna Durbin. The Hays Office, however, objected to the revealing costumes worn by Dale, Aura and the other female characters. In response to those objections, Universal designed more modest outfits for the female performers in the film's two sequels.

In his review of the film in the 2015 reference Radio Times Guide to Films, Alan Jones describes Flash Gordon as "non-stop thrill-a-minute stuff as Flash battles one adversary after another", and he states that it is "the best of the Crabbe trilogy of Flash Gordon films".

== Chapter list ==
1. "The Planet of Peril"
2. "The Tunnel of Terror"
3. "Captured by Shark Men"
4. "Battling the Sea Beast"
5. "The Destroying Ray"
6. "Flaming Torture"
7. "Shattering Doom"
8. "Tournament of Death"
9. "Fighting the Fire Dragon"
10. "The Unseen Peril"
11. "In the Claws of the Tigron"
12. "Trapped in the Turret"
13. "Rocketing to Earth"

== Sequels ==
Two sequels to Flash Gordon, also in serial form and starring Buster Crabbe, followed the popular 1936 production: Flash Gordon's Trip to Mars (15 chapters) in 1938 and Flash Gordon Conquers the Universe (12 chapters) in 1940. Between the releases of those two later productions, Crabbe starred in an entirely separate but similarly structured Universal science-fiction serial portraying Buck Rogers, another popular character also featured in magazines, comic strips, and on radio in the late 1920s and 1930s.

== See also ==
- 1936 in science fiction
