= Man of Iron (1935 film) =

1935 film

- Directed by: William C. McGann
- Screenplay by: William Wister Haines
- Starring: Barton MacLane; Mary Astor; John Eldredge; Dorothy Peterson; Joseph Crehan; Craig Reynolds
- Cinematography: L. William O'Connell
- Edited by: Terry O. Morse
- Music by: Bernhard Kaun
- Production company: Warner Bros. Pictures
- Distributed by: Warner Bros. Pictures
- Release date: December 21, 1935
- Running time: 61 minutes
- Country: United States
- Language: English

Man of Iron is a 1935 American drama film directed by William C. McGann and written by William Wister Haines. The film stars Barton MacLane, Mary Astor, John Eldredge, Dorothy Peterson, Joseph Crehan and Craig Reynolds. The film was released by Warner Bros. on December 21, 1935.

== Plot ==
Steel mill foreman Chris Bennett is pleased when he is chosen to be the new boss of Harrison Balding's entire business over Ed Tanahill, who is the owner's cousin. Tanahill and secretary Vida conspire to sabotage Chris's progress at the mill reputation with the men.

The hard-working and popular Chris now neglects the mill and incurs the wrath of his workers while wife Bessie rues the absence of their old friends. He finally comes to his senses and returns to his old position as foreman before it's too late.

== Cast ==
- Barton MacLane as Chris Bennett
- Mary Astor as Vida
- John Eldredge as Ed Tanahill
- Dorothy Peterson as Bessie Bennett
- Joseph Crehan as Tom Martin
- Craig Reynolds as Mr. Harry Adams
- Joe Sawyer as Crawford
- Joe King as Harrison Balding
- John Qualen as Collins
- Wild Bill Elliott as Charlie Fagan
- Florence Fair as Mrs. Balding
- Edward Keane as Mortgage Man
