= The Indians Are Coming =

1930 film

- Directed by: Henry MacRae
- Starring: Tim McCoy; Allene Ray; Edmund Cobb; Francis Ford
- Distributed by: Universal Pictures
- Release date: 1930
- Running time: 12 chapters
- Country: United States
- Language: English
- Box office: Almost $1,000,000

The Indians Are Coming is a 1930 American Pre-Code Universal movie serial based on The Great West That Was by William "Buffalo Bill" Cody. The serial was the first "all-talking" (complete sound rather than a silent movie with occasional sound sections) film of its kind. It played at The Roxy Theatre and was responsible for saving the film serial format into the sound era.

== Plot ==
Jack Manning (Tim McCoy) arrives in town from Gold Creek, California. He brings a message from George Woods (Francis Ford) to George's brother Tom Woods (Francis Ford in a dual role), and his niece Mary (Allene Ray), informing them he has struck gold and asking them to travel to California via a wagon train to be with him. Jack and Mary fall in love much to the displeasure of Rance Carter (Wilbur McGaugh), who has a yen for Mary himself. Carter causes the local Indians to go on the warpath in an attempt to break up Jack and Mary's wedding plans.

== Cast ==
- Tim McCoy as Jack Manning
- Allene Ray as Mary Woods
- Francis Ford in a dual role as George Woods/ Tom Woods
- Wilbur McGaugh (billed as Don Francis) as Rance Carter, the villain
- Edmund Cobb as Bill Williams
- Bud Osborne as Bull McGee

== Production ==
Along with a sequel Battling with Buffalo Bill (1931), this serial was based on a book called The Great West That Was by William "Buffalo Bill" Cody. Henry MacRae was the director. It reused stock footage of an Indian raid on a wagon train from the silent western The Flaming Frontier (1926).

== Release ==
=== Theatrical ===
The release of The Indians Are Coming was the first time a serial was given an "uptown" treatment. The serial played at The Roxy in New York City and had full runs across the country.

According to Raymond Stedman, The Indians Are Coming earned a profit on "near" $1M. The success of the serial ended doom-mongering about the sound technology being the end of the serial format. It is "credited with reviving interest in what seemed to be a dying form of entertainment" and proved that action sequences could still be done with sound equipment.

== Critical reception ==
Stedman compares Tim McCoy's delivery to that of Adam West in the Batman television series but declares it restrained compared to other stars. He goes on to comment that "Only the dog managed not to fall victim to the natural tendency of actors groomed in the silent film to overplay when thrust into a talkie."

== Chapter titles ==
1. Pals in Buckskin
2. A Call to Arms
3. A Furnace of Fear
4. The Red Terror
5. The Circle of Death
6. Hate's Harvest
7. Hostages of Fear
8. The Dagger Duel
9. The Blast of Death
10. Redskin's Vengeance
11. Frontiers Aflame
12. The Trail's End

_{Source:}

== See also ==
- List of American films of 1930
- List of film serials by year
- List of film serials by studio

Preceded by Terry of the Times (1930)	Universal Serial; The Indians are Coming (1930)	Succeeded by Finger Prints (1931)
