= Will Gould =

American cartoonist

Will Gould (1911–1984) was an American cartoonist best known for his comic strip Red Barry.

Distributed by King Features Syndicate, Gould's strip about two-fisted undercover cop Red Barry began Monday, March 19, 1934, as one of several strips introduced to compete with Dick Tracy by Chester Gould (no relation). Comics historian Rick Marschall labeled Red Barry as "one of the most individualistic strips of all time."

== Red Barry ==
In 1929, Gould began as a sports cartoonist for the Bronx Home News where he also drew the comic strip Felix O'Fan. For the New York Graphic he created Asparagus Tipps. Relocating to California in 1930, he freelanced to several syndicates before creating Red Barry, which he wrote and drew from 1934 to 1938. Gould drew Red Barry in a crisp, clean line style. His assistant on the strip was Walter Frehm. Contract disputes between Gould and King Features brought Red Barry to an end in 1939.
