= Heroes of the West (1932 film) =

1932 serial

- Directed by: Ray Taylor
- Based on: "The Tie That Binds" (novel) by Peter B. Kyne
- Starring: Noah Beery Jr. Onslow Stevens; Julie Bishop
- Distributed by: Universal Pictures
- Release date: June 20, 1932
- Running time: 12 chapters (225 min)
- Country: United States
- Language: English

Heroes of the West (1932) is a Universal Pre-Code movie serial that depicts the dangers and thrills of building a transcontinental railroad. This was the 82nd serial (and the 14th serial with sound) to be released by Universal. It was remade in 1938 as Flaming Frontiers (serial).

== Plot overview ==
John Blaine – helped by his teenaged son and daughter, Noah and Ann – work to build a section of a transcontinental railroad "through the heart of the wild and wooly west." Their section threads through Wyoming territory, dangerously close to hostile Indians. In addition to tribulations inherent in the Old West, work is hindered by crooked foreman Rance Judd, who is "secretly in the pay of a rival contractor and aims to make Blaine lose his government railroad contract by fouling up construction in any way he can" with help from his henchmen Butch Gore, Bart Eaton, and Buckskin Joe. Blaine is aided by a group of men also working on the railroad: surveyor Tom Crosby, scout Noah Blaine, and rail crew leader Bart Eaton. Together, our heroes must battle skullduggery from Judd's henchmen, stagecoach problems, saloon brawls, horse stampedes, train robberies, Indian attacks, and other perils "to complete the line on time."

As is typical in serial films, each episode ends on a cliff-hanger. For example: after a tremendous fight in an old trapper's cabin, the cabin catches on fire and burns down with our heroes still inside; however, the next episode shows how they escaped the fire through a secret tunnel in the cabin floor.

== Cast ==
- Noah Beery Jr. as Noah Blaine
- Julie Bishop as Ann Blaine (as Diane Duval)
- Onslow Stevens as Tom Crosby
- William Desmond as John Blaine
- Martha Mattox as Aunt Martha
- Philo McCullough as Rance Judd
- Harry Tenbrook as Butch Gore
- Frank Lackteen as Buckskin Joe
- Edmund Cobb as Bart Eaton
- Francis Ford as a Cavalry Captain

== Production ==
Along with Flaming Frontiers (1938), this serial was based on The Tie That Binds by Peter B. Kyne. Heroes of the West was Universal's 82nd serial. In terms of Universal's serials in the sound era, it was the 14th. See the list of film serials by studio for more information about other serials of the time. Much of the material was reused in Universal's 1942 serial Overland Mail starring Lon Chaney Jr.

Heroes of the West was directed by prolific film director Ray Taylor.

== Chapter titles ==
1. Blazing the Trail
2. Red Peril
3. The Avalanche
4. A Shot from the Dark
5. The Holdup
6. Captured by Indians
7. Flaming Arrows
8. Frontier Justice
9. The Iron Monster
10. Thundering Death
11. Thundering Hoofs [[sic| [sic]]]
12. The End of the Trail

_{Source:}

The 12 chapters ran for a total series screen time of 225 minutes.

== See also ==
- List of American films of 1932
- List of film serials by year
- List of film serials by studio

Preceded by The Airmail Mystery (1932)	Universal Serial; Heroes of the West (1932)	Succeeded by Jungle Mystery (1932)
