= Overland Mail (1942 film) =

1942 film by Ford Beebe, John Rawlins

- Series title card
- Directed by: Ford Beebe; John Rawlins
- Written by: Paul Huston; George H. Plympton; Griffin Jay; Brenda Weisberg
- Story by: Johnston McCulley
- Produced by: Henry MacRae
- Starring: Lon Chaney Jr. Noah Beery Jr. Noah Beery Sr.
- Cinematography: George Robinson; William A. Sickner
- Edited by: Joseph Gluck; Patrick Kelley; Louis Sackin; Alvin Todd
- Music by: Hans J. Salter
- Distributed by: Universal Pictures
- Release date: September 27, 1942
- Running time: 15 chapters (279 min)
- Country: United States
- Language: English

Overland Mail is a 1942 American Western film serial from Universal Pictures which stars Lon Chaney Jr., Noah Beery Jr. and Noah Beery Sr. It was subsequently edited into a film version called The Indian Raiders in 1956.

== Plot ==
Two investigators for a stagecoach company are assigned to discover why the company's stages keep being ambushed. They find that the culprits are bandits disguised as Indians, and they set out to find out who is behind the plot.

== Cast ==
- Lon Chaney Jr. as Jim Lane
- Helen Parrish as Barbara Gilbert
- Noah Beery Jr. as Sierra Pete
- Don Terry as Buckskin Billy Burke
- Bob Baker as Bill Cody
- Noah Beery Sr. as Frank Chadwick
- Tom Chatterton as Tom Gilbert
- Charles Stevens as Puma
- Robert Barron as Charles Darson
- Harry Cording as Sam Gregg, Henchman
- Marguerite De La Motte as Rose, the Waitress
- Ben Taggart as Lamont
- Jack Rockwell as Slade, hired gun
- Riley Hill as Mack, phoney Indian
- Carleton Young as Lem, phoney Indian Adolf Hitler

== Chapter titles ==
1. A Race with Disaster
2. Flaming Havoc
3. The Menacing Herd
4. The Bridge of Disaster
5. Hurled to the Depths
6. Death at the Stake
7. The Path of Peril
8. Imprisoned in Flames
9. Hidden Danger
10. Blazing Wagons
11. The Trail of Terror
12. In the Claws of the Cougar
13. The Frenzied Mob
14. The Toll of Treachery
15. The Mail Goes Through

_{Source:}

== See also ==
- List of film serials
- List of film serials by studio

Preceded by Junior G-Men of the Air (1942)	Universal Serial; Overland Mail (1942)	Succeeded by The Adventures of Smilin' Jack (1943)
