= John Hickson (cinematographer) =

American cinematographer

John Hickson was an American cinematographer of 24 films between 1928 and 1940.
