= George H. Plympton =

American screenwriter (1889–1972)

- Born: September 2, 1889; Brooklyn, New York, U.S.
- Died: April 11, 1972 (aged 82); Bakersfield, California, U.S.
- Occupation: Screenwriter
- Years active: 1912–1972

George H. Plympton (September 2, 1889 – April 11, 1972) was an American screenwriter. He was born in Brooklyn, New York.

A prolific screenwriter, Plympton collaborated in almost 300 films. His earliest known credits date back to 1912 as he concentrated almost exclusively on westerns. During the sound era he switched his focus to serials mostly for Columbia, Republic and Universal studios, co-scripting and adapting such chapter plays as Tarzan the Fearless (1933), Flash Gordon (1936), The Spider's Web (1938), The Phantom Creeps (1939), The Green Hornet (1940), Flash Gordon Conquers the Universe (1940), The Masked Marvel (1943), Chick Carter, Detective (1946), Brick Bradford (1947), Superman (1948), Batman and Robin (1949), and Atom Man vs. Superman (1950). Active until 1957, he also was one of the principal writers on Columbia's Durango Kid and Jungle Jim series.

Plympton died in Bakersfield, California, at the age of 82.

== Selected filmography ==
- When Men Are Tempted (1917)
- The Adventure Shop (1919)
- A Broadway Cowboy (1920)
- Help Wanted - Male (1920)
- The Man Trackers (1921)
- The Satin Girl (1923)
- Yankee Madness (1924)
- Blood and Steel (1925)
- The Texas Bearcat (1925)
- The Stolen Ranch (1926)
- Hard Fists (1927)
- The Harvest of Hate (1929)
- Love Bound (1932)
- Idaho Kid (1936)
- The Gambling Terror (1937)
- Paroled from the Big House (1938)
- Pride of the Bowery (1940)
