= Alvin Todd =

American film editor

- Born: January 23, 1903; Pittsburgh, Pennsylvania, United States
- Died: June 27, 1964; Los Angeles, California, United States
- Occupation: Film editor

Alvin Todd (23 January 1903 – 27 June 1964), was an American film editor. He edited 62 films between 1929 and 1946.

He was born in Pennsylvania, United States and died in Los Angeles, California.
