= Jack Livingston =

American actor (1885–1944)

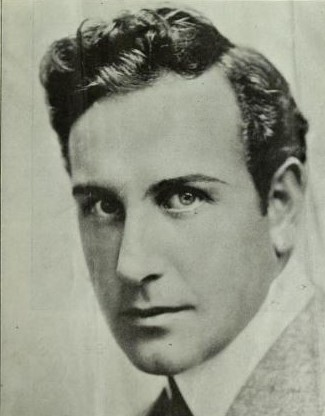
- Livingston in 1921
- Born: Harold Antill Livingston; November 29, 1885; St. Albans, Vermont, U.S.
- Died: February 27, 1944 (aged 58); Los Angeles, California, U.S.
- Occupation: Actor
- Years active: 1913–1928
- Spouse(s): Aleda Des Lauriers (m. 19??; div. 19??); Alice Livingston (m. 19??)
- Children: 3

Jack Livingston (born Harold Antill Livingston; November 29, 1885 – February 27, 1944) was a film actor in the United States. He starred in several films including alongside Jane Novak in The Golden Trail. He appeared in at least 44 feature films. His great-grandfather Philip Livingston signed the Declaration of Independence and he was also related to Robert Livingston who helped negotiate the Louisiana Purchase. In 1916 he was identified as Myrtle Stedman's new leading man at Oliver Morosco Photoplay Company.

== Selected filmography ==
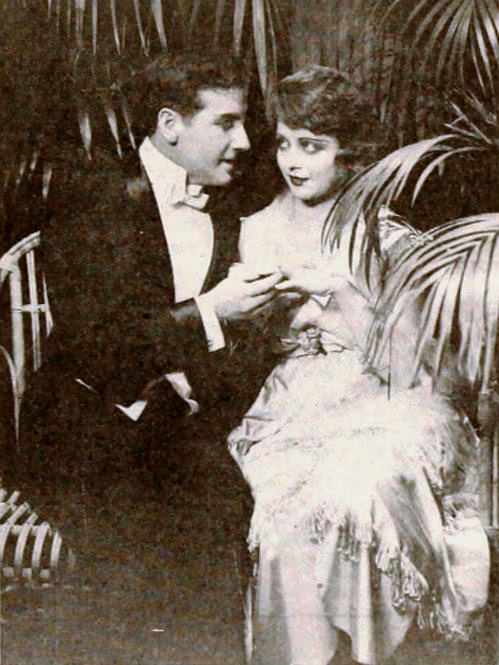
With Jane Novak in The Golden Trail (1920)

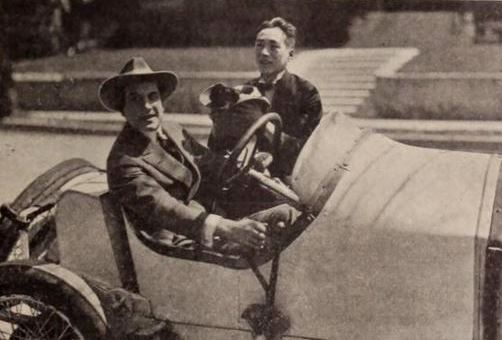
Still with Livingston and Yutaka Abe in Who Is to Blame? (1918)

- Captivating Mary (1915)
- The Stranger Love (1916)
- Flying Colors (1917)
- Ashes of Hope (1917)
- Because of a Woman (1917)
- Wooden Shoes (1917)
- Madcap Madge (1917)
- The Stainless Barrier (1917)
- The Desert Man (1917)
- The Dark Road (1917)
- Ten of Diamonds (1917)
- The Eyes of the World (1917)
- His Enemy, the Law (1918)
- Who Is to Blame? (1918)
- The Price of Applause (1918)
- Cowardice Court (1919)
- The Golden Trail (1920)
- The Misfit Wife (1920)
- Judge Her Not (1921)
- Silent Years (1921)
- The Wolve's Range (1921)
- Man's Law and God's (1922)
- Crashing Courage (1923)
- The Frame Up (1923)
- The Power Divine (1923)
- The Range Patrol (1923)
- The Greatest Menace (1923)
- Scars of Hate (1923)
- The Vow of Vengeance (1923)
- Beaten (1924)
