= Sis Hopkins =

Sis Hopkins may refer to:

- Sis Hopkins (1919 film), a comedy film
- Sis Hopkins (1941 film), an American comedy film
