= Man's Law and God's =

1922 film

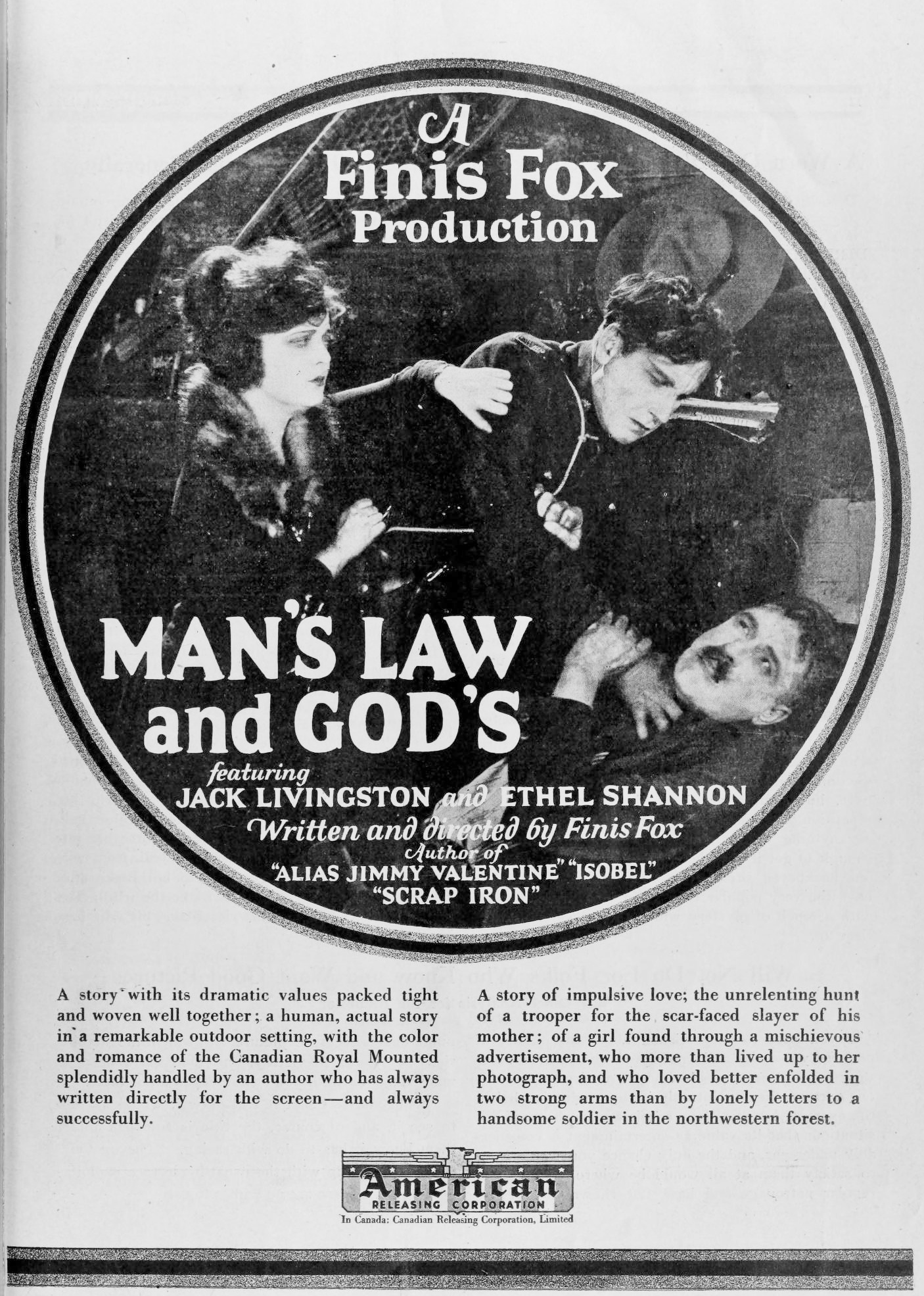
- Directed by: Finis Fox
- Written by: Finis Fox
- Starring: Jack Livingston; Ethel Shannon; Rose Melville
- Production company: Finis Fox Corporation
- Distributed by: American Releasing Corporation
- Release date: April 16, 1922
- Running time: 50 minutes
- Country: United States
- Languages: Silent; English intertitles

Man's Law and God's is a 1922 American silent drama film directed by Finis Fox and starring Jack Livingston, Ethel Shannon and Rose Melville.

== Cast ==
- Jack Livingston as Bruce MacDonald
- Ethel Shannon as Kitty Roshay
- Kate Anderson as Bruce's Mother
- Bobbie Mack as Uncle Jimmie
- Joy Winthrop as Aunt Jenny
- George Cummings as Cameo Brooks
- Rose Melville as Helen DuBrose

== Bibliography ==
- Connelly, Robert B. The Silents: Silent Feature Films, 1910-36, Volume 40, Issue 2. December Press, 1998.
- Munden, Kenneth White. The American Film Institute Catalog of Motion Pictures Produced in the United States, Part 1. University of California Press, 1997.
