= The Golden Trail =

The Golden Trail may refer to:

- The Golden Trail (1920 film), silent film
- The Golden Trail (1940 film), American film
