= Ten of Diamonds (film) =

1917 film

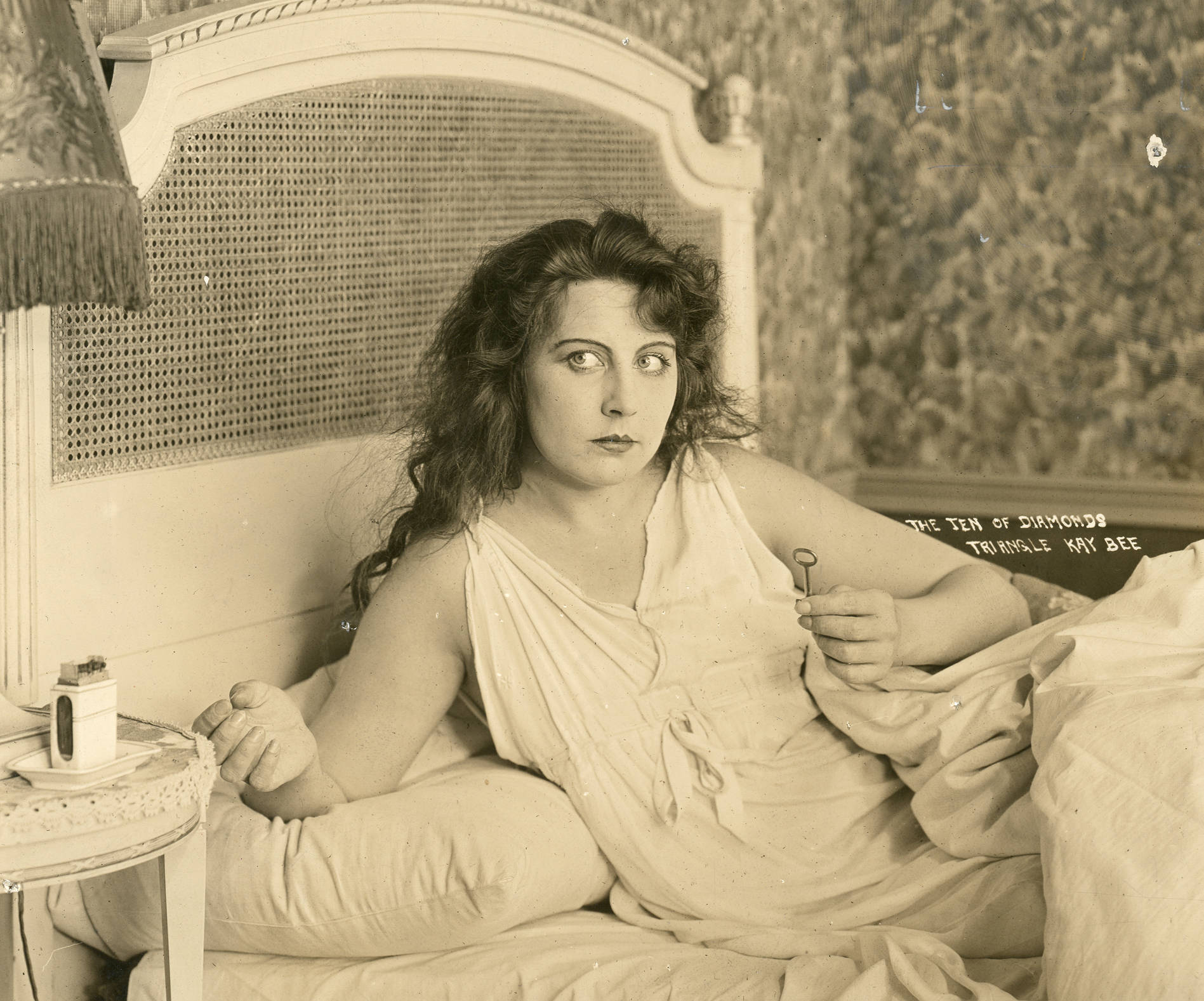
- Still with Dorothy Dalton
- Directed by: Raymond B. West
- Written by: L. V. Jefferson
- Story by: Albert Cowles
- Starring: Dorothy Dalton; Jack Livingston; J. Barney Sherry
- Production company: Triangle Film Corporation
- Distributed by: Triangle Distributing
- Release date: September 2, 1917
- Running time: 5 reels
- Country: United States
- Language: Silent (English intertitles)

Ten of Diamonds is a 1917 American silent drama film directed by Raymond B. West and starring Dorothy Dalton, Jack Livingston, and J. Barney Sherry.

== Cast ==
- Dorothy Dalton as Neva Blaine
- Jack Livingston as Warren Kennedy
- J. Barney Sherry as Ellis Hopper
- Dorcas Matthews as Blanche Calloway
- Billy Shaw (Undetermined Role)

== Bibliography ==
- Robert B. Connelly. The Silents: Silent Feature Films, 1910-36. December Press, 1998.
