= Flying Colors (1917 film) =

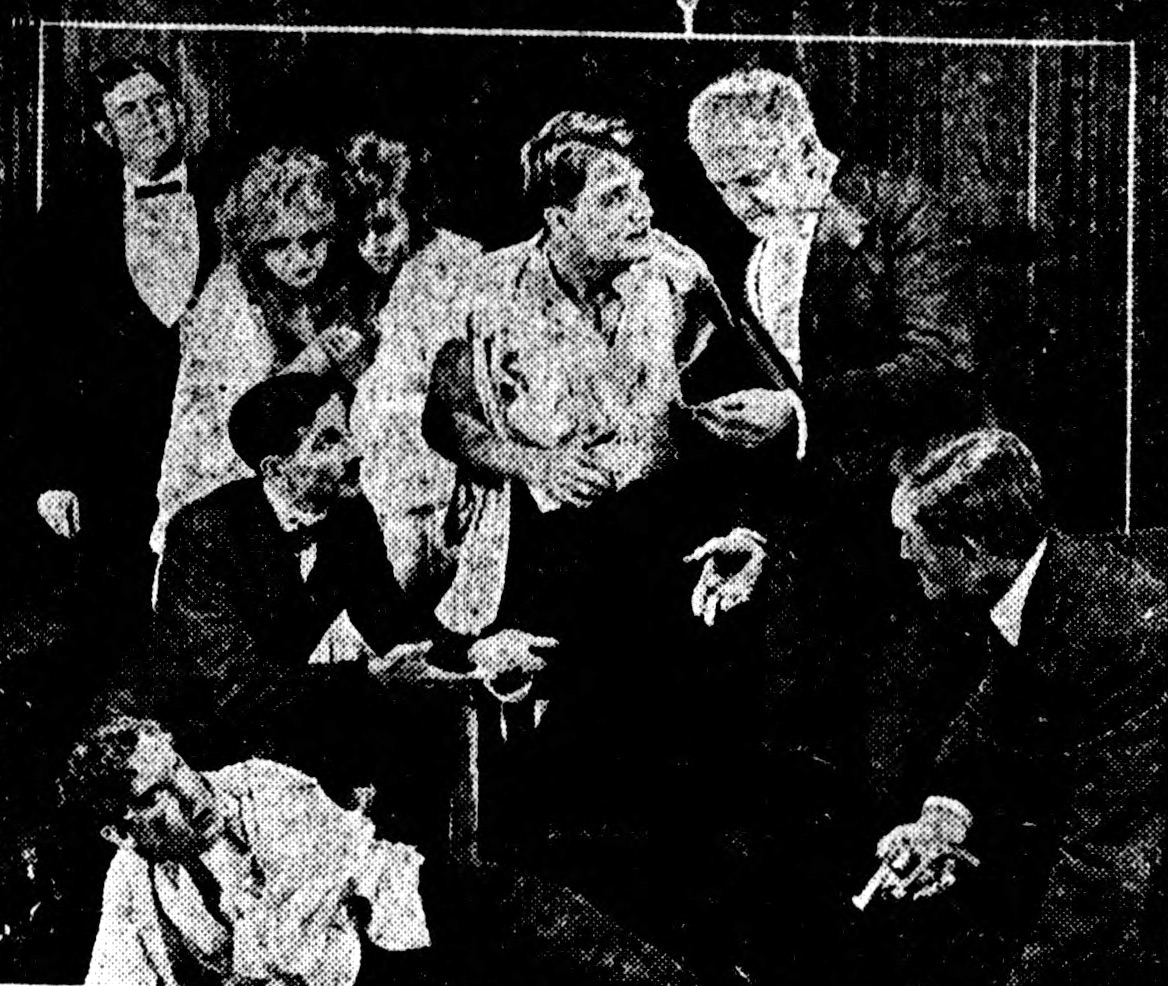
- Scene from the film.
- Directed by: Frank Borzage
- Written by: John Lynch; R. Cecil Smith
- Starring: William Desmond
- Production company: Triangle Film Corporation
- Distributed by: Triangle Distributing Corporation
- Release date: September 23, 1917
- Running time: 5 reels
- Country: United States
- Language: Silent

Flying Colors is a 1917 silent American action film directed by Frank Borzage for Triangle Film Corporation, starring William Desmond as detective Brent Brewster. The film also featured Golda Madden, Jack Livingston as Captain Drake, J. Barney Sherry as Craig Lansing, and a small role for Desmond's future wife Mary McIvor as a stenographer.

== Cast ==
- William Desmond as Brent Brewster
- Golda Madden as Ann
- Jack Livingston as Captain Drake
- J. Barney Sherry as Craig Lansing
- Mary McIvor as Stenographer
- Laura Sears as Ruth Lansing
- George W. Chase as Jimmy McMahon
- J. P. Lockney as Brewster Sr.
