= In His Brother's Place =

1919 silent film directed by Harry L. Franklin

- Directed by: Harry L. Franklin
- Screenplay by: A. S. Le Vino (Scenario)
- Story by: Hale Hamilton
- Produced by: Maxwell Karger
- Starring: Hale Hamilton; Emmett C. King; Ruby Lafayette
- Cinematography: Rudolph Bergquist
- Production company: Metro Pictures
- Release date: July 14, 1919 (US)
- Running time: 5 reels
- Country: United States
- Language: English

In His Brother's Place is a 1919 American silent comedy-drama film, directed by Harry L. Franklin. It stars Hale Hamilton, Emmett C. King, and Ruby Lafayette, and was released on July 14, 1919.

== Cast list ==
- Hale Hamilton as twin brothers, Nelson and J. Barrington Drake
- Emmett C. King as Jonathan Drake
- Ruby Lafayette as Amanda Drake
- Mary McIvor as Bessie Judd
- Marguerite Snow as Kitty Judd
- Jessie De Jarnette as Martha Judd
- Howard Crampton as Abel Cruck
- Ward Wing as Abel Cruck Jr.
