= Ruby Lafayette =

American actress (1844–1935)

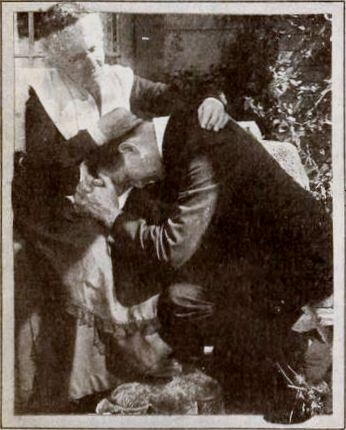
- Ruby Lafayette and Rupert Julian in Mother o' Mine (1917)
- Born: July 22, 1844; Augusta, Kentucky, U.S.
- Died: April 3, 1935 (aged 90); Los Angeles, California, U.S.
- Occupation: Actress
- Years active: 1917–1932
- Spouse: John T. Curran

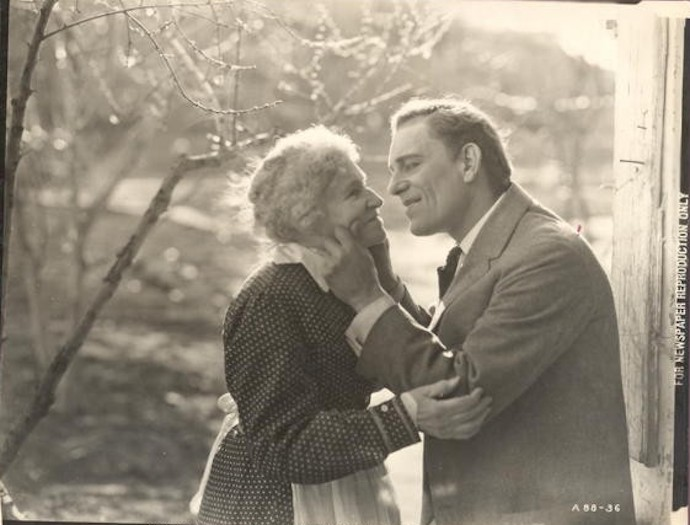
Ruby Lafayette with Lon Chaney in The Miracle Man (1919)

Ruby Lafayette (July 22, 1844 – April 3, 1935) was an American film actress, known for Sue of the South (1919), Big Bob (1921) and The Man Trap (1917). She was married to John T. Curran.

At age 82, Lafayette nearly died from injuries sustained when she was hit by a motorist.

She died in Los Angeles on April 3, 1935.

== Filmography ==
- Mother O' Mine - Mrs. Standing - 1917
- The Man Trap - Mrs. Mull - 1917
- The Kaiser, the Beast of Berlin - Grandmother Marcas - 1917
- Beauty in Chains - Doña Perfecta (as Ruby La Fayette) - 1918
- Three Mounted Men - Mrs. Masters - 1918
- The Yellow Dog - Mrs. Blakely - 1918
- The Strange Woman - Mrs. Hemingway - 1918
- Sue of the South - Granny Sue Gordon (as Ruby La Fayette) - 1918
- Rustling a Bride - Aunt (as Ruby LaFayette) - 1919
- Cyclone Smith Plays Trumps (Short) - 1919
- In His Brother's Place - Amanda Drake (as Ruby La Fayette) - 1919
- The Miracle Man – (uncredited) old lady Chaney pushes in wheelbarrow - 1919
- Toby's Bow - Grandmother - 1919
- Polly of the Storm Country - Granny Hope - 1920
- Old Lady 31 - Granny - 1920
- Big Bob (Short) - Bob's Mother - 1920
- Borderland - Eileen - 1921
- Catch My Smoke - Mrs. Archer - 1922
- The Power of a Lie - Mrs. Hammond - 1922
- Hollywood - Grandmother Whitaker - 1922
- The Day of Faith - Granny Maynard - 1923
- The Phantom Horseman - Maxwell's Mother - 1924
- Idle Tongues - Miss Pepper - 1924
- Tomorrow's Love - Grandmother - 1925
- The Coming of Amos - Nadia's Nurse - 1925
- The Wedding Song - Mother - 1925
- Butterflies in the Rain - Mrs. Humphries - 1925
- Marriage by Contract - Grandma - 1926
- Not So Dumb - Grandma (uncredited) 1928
- If I Had a Million - Idylwood Resident (uncredited) 1932
