= Gambling in Souls =

1919 film directed by Harry F. Millarde

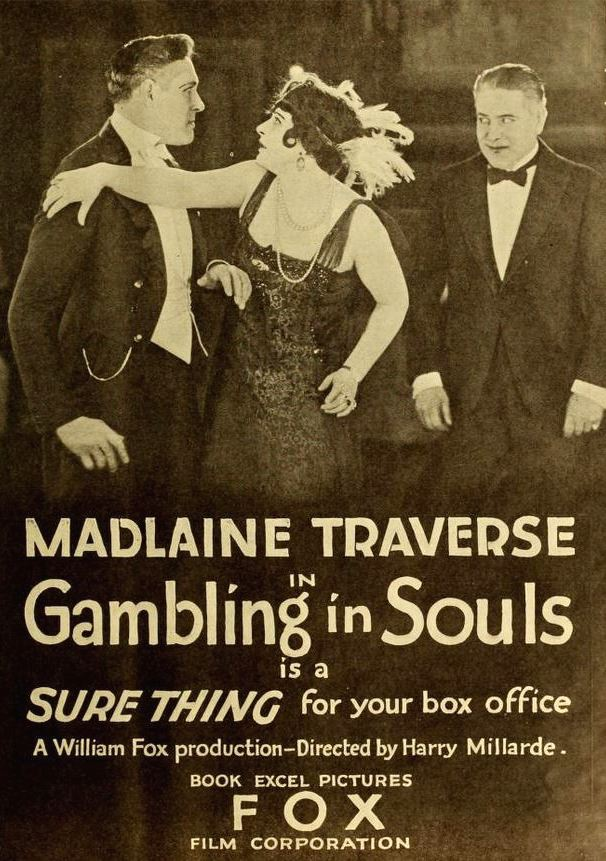
- Advertisement for Gambling in Souls on pages 1289 of the Moving Picture World (March 8, 1919)
- Directed by: Harry F. Millarde
- Written by: Denison Clift
- Story by: Samuel J. Warshawsky
- Starring: Madlaine Traverse; Herbert Heyes; Murdock MacQuarrie; Lew Zehring; Mary McIvor; Henry A. Barrows
- Cinematography: Harry W. Gerstad
- Production company: Fox Film Corporation
- Distributed by: Fox Film Corporation
- Release date: March 9, 1919
- Running time: 6 reels
- Country: United States
- Languages: Silent film (English intertitles)

Gambling in Souls is a lost 1919 American silent crime drama film directed by Harry F. Millarde and starring Madlaine Traverse, Herbert Heyes, Murdock MacQuarrie, Lew Zehring, Mary McIvor, and Henry A. Barrows. The film was released by Fox Film Corporation on March 9, 1919.

== Plot ==
Marcia Dunning's husband, Robert, commits suicide after he buys worthless stock at a broker's advice, and loses everything. His suicide note explains why and she plans to destroy the broker in turn. Marcia sends her daughter, Edith, to live with family in Maine, and contacts a gambler to help her avenge her husband.

She gains employment as a roulette wheel operator in a gambling house where the broker frequents. Meanwhile, in Maine, the broker's son has fallen in love with Edith and they have gotten married in secret. The son later arrives in New York and wanders into the gambling house, where Marcia takes notice of him. He plays at her wheel and she cheats him out of his winnings with a magnetic ring, and later goads him into steal bonds from his father's safe. He bets at her wheel again, with the bonds, and loses a second time. The broker's partner discovers that he has stolen the bonds and demands that he is arrested, and the son pleads with Marcia for mercy. It is then that she reveals her identity and laughs at him.

He returns home and finds Edith there, as a surprise, and confesses that he has lost everything and stolen from his father. Edith turns to her mother to plead for the bonds return, and through this, learns of her daughter's marriage to the broker's son. Marcia asks the broker's partner to return his winnings, but he refuses. He then stakes his half of the business against his partner, loses, and Marcia puts herself up as winnings. She is thwarted in her attempt to use her magnet ring, but fortune favors her, and she wins everything. The broker's son is saved by Marcia returning the stolen bonds, and consents to his marriage with Edith.

== Cast ==
- Madlaine Traverse as Marcia Dunning, aka Madame Rouge
- Herbert Heyes as 'Duke' Charters
- Murdock MacQuarrie as Thomas Philborn
- Lew Zehring as Dick Philborn
- Mary McIvor as Edith Dunning
- Henry A. Barrows as Latimer (as Henry Barrows)
- Marian Skinner as Mrs. Caldwell (as Marion Skinner)
- William Clifford as Robert Dunning

== Reception ==
Billboard reviewer Marion Russell was very positive in their review, saying of the settings, "While gambling scenes predominate, the atmosphere is high-grade and the emotional force of the play ascends with each succeeding reel."

Motion Picture News reviewer Peter Milne gave the film a positive review, finding Madlaine Traverse's performance to be played with "sufficient vehemence" and the settings to be of "average worth."

Moving Picture World reviewer Hanford C. Judson said of the film "the director has used photography skillfully and also has built his scenes with an entertaining freshness." He also had great praise for Madlaine Traverse's performance.

Variety's review was mostly positive, praising Madlaine Traverse for not overacting and the "handsome" settings.

== Censorship ==
The Kansas Board of Review, one of six state censorship boards, initially rejected the film in its entirety. Upon re-evaluation, the following was removed from reel 4: All gambling scenes of roulette wheel, use of magnetic ring, and scenes of struggle.

== Preservation ==
With no holdings located in archives, the film is now considered lost.

== See also ==
- List of lost films
- 1937 Fox vault fire
