= A Hero of Our Time =

1840 novel by Mikhail Lermontov

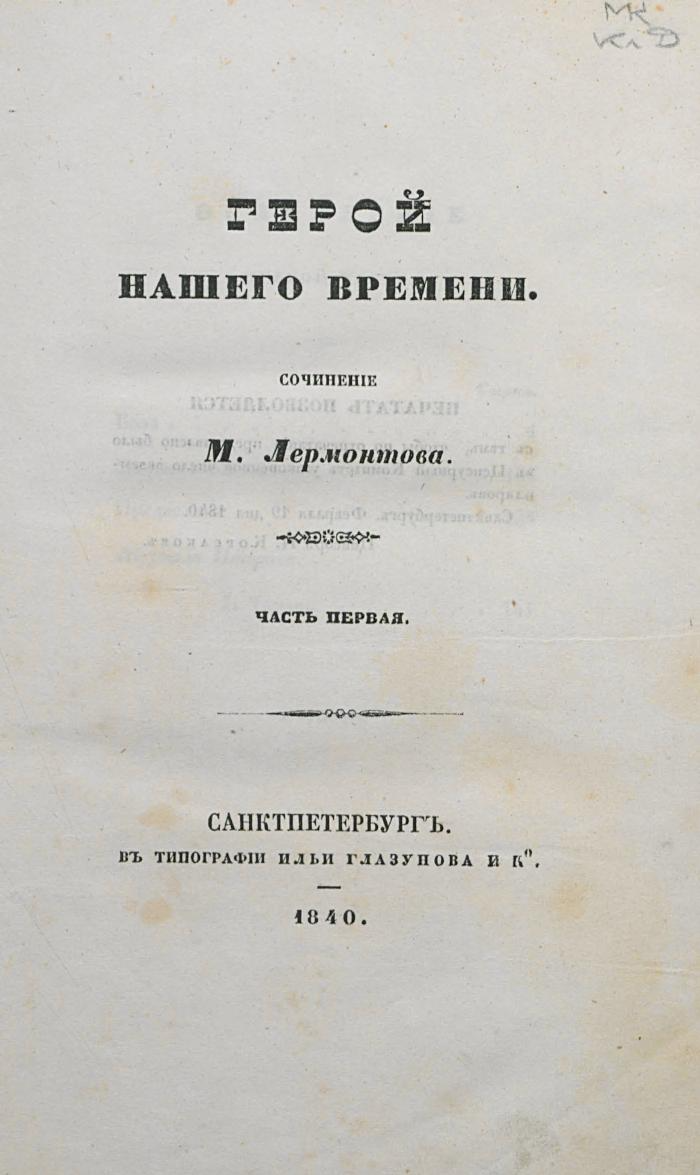
- Author: Mikhail Lermontov
- Original title: Герой нашего времени
- Language: Russian
- Publisher: Iliya Glazunov & Co (Типография Ильи Глазунова и Ко)
- Publication date: 1840
- Publication place: Russia

A Hero of Our Time (Russian: Герой нашего времени, romanized: Gerój nášego vrémeni, IPA: [ɡʲɪˈroj ˈnaʂɨvə ˈvrʲemʲɪnʲɪ]) is a novel by Mikhail Lermontov, written in 1839, published in 1840, and revised in 1841.

It is an example of the superfluous man novel, noted for its compelling Byronic hero (or antihero) Pechorin and for the beautiful descriptions of the Caucasus. This is the first psychological fiction in the history of Russian literature. There are several English translations, including one by Vladimir Nabokov and Dmitri Nabokov in 1958.

== Grigory Alexandrovich Pechorin ==
Pechorin is the embodiment of the Byronic hero. Byron's works were of international repute and Lermontov mentions his name several times throughout the novel. According to the Byronic tradition, Pechorin is a character of contradiction. He is both sensitive and cynical. He is possessed of extreme arrogance, yet has a deep insight into his own character and epitomizes the melancholy of the Romantic hero who broods on the futility of existence and the certainty of death. Pechorin's whole philosophy concerning existence is oriented towards the nihilistic, creating in him somewhat of a distanced, alienated personality. The name Pechorin is drawn from that of the Pechora River, in the far north, as a homage to Alexander Pushkin's Eugene Onegin, named after the Onega River.

Pechorin treats women as an incentive for endless conquests and does not consider them worthy of any particular respect. He considers women such as Princess Mary to be little more than pawns in his games of romantic conquest, which in effect hold no meaning in his listless pursuit of pleasure. This is shown in his comment on Princess Mary: "I often wonder why I'm trying so hard to win the love of a girl I have no desire to seduce and whom I'd never marry."

The only contradiction in Pechorin's attitude to women are his genuine feelings for Vera, who loves him despite, and perhaps due to, all his faults. At the end of "Princess Mary" one is presented with a moment of hope as Pechorin gallops after Vera. The reader almost assumes that a meaning to his existence may be attained and that Pechorin can finally realize that true feelings are possible. Yet a lifetime of superficiality and cynicism cannot be so easily eradicated and when fate intervenes and Pechorin's horse collapses, he undertakes no further effort to reach his one hope of redemption: "I saw how futile and senseless it was to pursue lost happiness. What more did I want? To see her again? For what?”

Pechorin's chronologically last adventure was first described in the book, showing the events that explain his upcoming fall into depression and retreat from society, resulting in his self-predicted death. The narrator is Maxim Maximytch telling the story of a beautiful Circassian princess, Bela, whom Azamat abducts for Pechorin in exchange for Kazbich's horse. Maxim describes Pechorin's exemplary persistence to convince Bela to give herself sexually to him, in which she with time reciprocates. After living with Bela for some time, Pechorin starts explicating his need for freedom, which Bela starts noticing, fearing he might leave her. Though Bela is completely devoted to Pechorin, she says she's not his slave, rather a daughter of a Circassian tribal chieftain, also showing the intention of leaving if he "doesn't love her". Maxim's sympathy for Bela makes him question Pechorin's intentions. Pechorin admits he loves her and is ready to die for her, but "he has a restless fancy and insatiable heart, and that his life is emptier day by day". He thinks his only remedy is to travel, to keep his spirit alive.

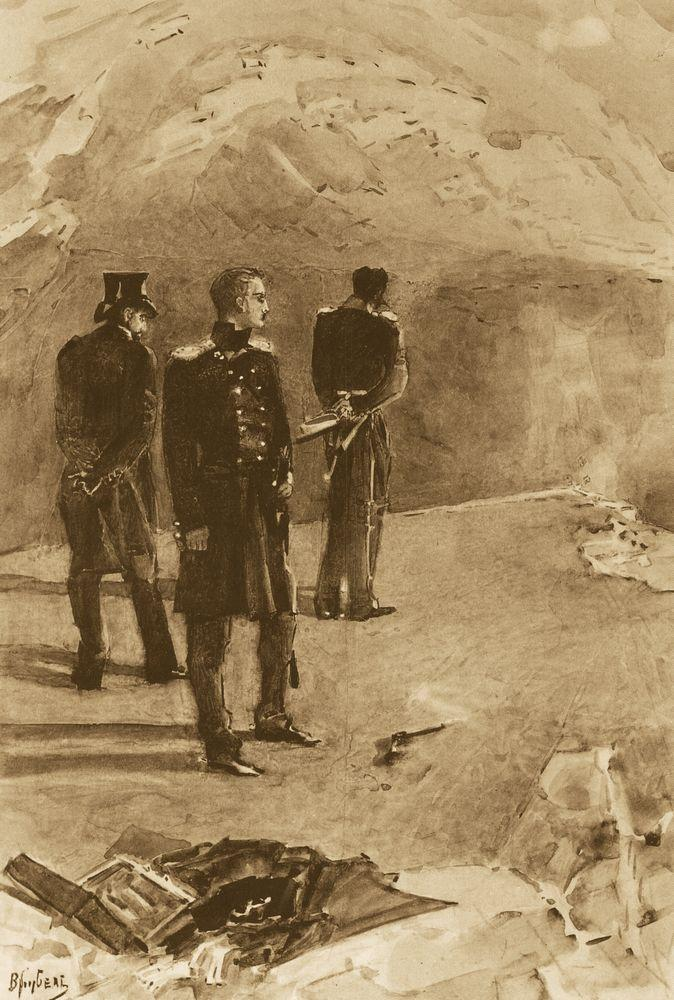
The duel of Pechorin and Grushnitsky by Mikhail Vrubel

However, Pechorin's behavior soon changes after Bela gets kidnapped by his enemy Kazbich, and becomes mortally wounded. After two days of suffering in delirium Bela spoke of her inner fears and her feelings for Pechorin, who listened without once leaving her side. After her death, Pechorin becomes physically ill, loses weight and becomes unsociable. After meeting with Maxim again, he acts coldly and antisocial, explicating deep depression and disinterest in interaction. He soon dies on his way back from Persia, admitting before that he is sure to never return.

Pechorin described his own personality as self-destructive, admitting he himself doesn't understand his purpose in the world of men. His boredom with life, feeling of emptiness, forces him to indulge in all possible pleasures and experiences, which soon, cause the downfall of those closest to him. He starts to realize this with Vera and Grushnitsky, while the tragedy with Bela soon leads to his complete emotional collapse.

His crushed spirit after this and after the duel with Grushnitsky can be interpreted that he is not the detached character that he makes himself out to be. Rather, it shows that he suffers from his actions. Yet many of his actions are described both by himself and appear to the reader to be arbitrary. Yet this is strange as Pechorin's intelligence is very high (typical of a Byronic hero). Pechorin's explanation as to why his actions are arbitrary can be found in the last chapter where he speculates about fate. He sees his arbitrary behaviour not as being a subconscious reflex to past moments in his life but rather as fate. Pechorin grows dissatisfied with his life as each of his arbitrary actions lead him through more emotional suffering which he represses from the view of others.

== Chapters ==
The stories within A Hero of Our Time are not sorted by chronological order, but rather are sequenced in a way that allows the reader to approach Pechorin first through the external lenses of Maxim Maximytch and the travel writer, then later through his own words from his diaries. The stories are presented in the novel in the following order:

Stories within A Hero of Our Time as presented in the novel
I - Bela
II - Maxim Maximytch
Foreword
Chapter 1 - Taman
Chapter 2 - Princess Mary
Chapter 3 - The Fatalist

The chronological order of these stories is believed to be as such: Taman, Princess Mary, Bela, The Fatalist, Maxim Maximytch, Foreword.

== Cultural references ==
Albert Camus' novel The Fall begins with an excerpt from Lermontov's foreword to A Hero of Our Time: "Some were dreadfully insulted, and quite seriously, to have held up as a model such an immoral character as A Hero of Our Time; others shrewdly noticed that the author had portrayed himself and his acquaintances. A Hero of Our Time, gentlemen, is in fact a portrait, but not of an individual; it is the aggregate of the vices of our whole generation in their fullest expression."

In Ian Fleming's From Russia with Love the plot revolves upon Soviet agent Tatiana Romanova feigning an infatuation with MI6's James Bond and offering to defect to the West provided he'll be sent to pick her up in Istanbul, Turkey. The Soviets elaborate a complex backstory about how she spotted the file about the British spy during her clerical work at SMERSH headquarters and became smitten with him, making her state that his picture made her think of Lermontov's Pechorin.

In Ingmar Bergman's 1963 film The Silence, the young son is seen reading the book in bed. In the opening sequence of Bergman's next film, Persona (1966), the same child actor is seen waking in what appears to be a mortuary and reaching for the same book.

Claude Sautet's film A Heart in Winter (Un cœur en hiver) was said to be based on "his memories of" the Princess Mary section. The relationship with Lermontov's work is quite loose – the film takes place in contemporary Paris, where a young violin repairer (played by Daniel Auteuil) seeks to seduce his business partner's girlfriend, a gifted violinist named Camille, into falling for his carefully contrived charms. He does this purely for the satisfaction of gaining control of her emotionally, while never loving her sincerely. He is a modern-day Pechorin.

== Screen and stage adaptations ==
In 1966, the anthology series The Wednesday Play adapted the novel for television, in which Alan Bates starred as Grigory. It aired on September 28, 1966.

In 2011 Alex Mcsweeney adapted the novel into an English-language playscript. Previewed at the International Youth Arts Festival in Kingston upon Thames, Surrey, UK in July, it subsequently premiered in August of the same year at Zoo Venues in the Edinburgh Fringe Festival. Critics received it positively, generally giving 4- and 5-star reviews.

In 2014, German stage director Kateryna Sokolova adapted the novel focusing on its longest novella, Princess Mary. The play, directed by Kateryna Sokolova, premiered at the Schauspielhaus Zürich on 28 May. The production received critical acclaim, especially praising it for not having lost "neither the linguistic finesse nor the social paralysis of Lermontov’s Zeitgeist", both of which constitute the novel's Byronic character.

== Bibliography of English translations ==
Translations:

1. Sketches of Russian life in the Caucasus. By a Russe, many years resident amongst the various mountain tribes. London: Ingram, Cook and Co., 1853. 315 pp. "The illustrated family novelist" series, #2. (a liberal translation with changed names of the heroes; "Taman" not translated).
2. The hero of our days. Transl. by Theresa Pulszky London: T. Hodgson, 1854. 232 pp. "The Parlour Library". Vol.112. ("Fatalist" not translated).
3. A hero of our own times. Now first transl. into English. London: Bogue, 1854. 231 pp., ill. (the first full translation of the novel by an anonymous translator).
4. A hero of our time. Transl. by R. I. Lipmann. London: Ward and Downey, 1886. XXVIII, 272 pp. ("Fatalist" not translated).
5. Taman. In: Tales from the Russian. Dubrovsky by Pushkin. New year's eve by Gregorowitch. Taman by Lermontoff. London: The Railway and general automatic library, 1891, pp. 229–251.
6. Russian reader: Lermontof's modern hero, with English translation and biographical sketch by Ivan Nestor-Schnurmann. Cambridge: Univ. press, 1899. XX, 403 pp. (a dual language edition; "Fatalist" not translated)
7. Maxim Maximich. — In: Wiener L. Anthology of Russian literature. T. 2, part 2. London—N.Y., 1903, pp. 157–164. (a reduced version of the "Maxim Maximich" chapter).
8. The heart of a Russian. Transl. by J. H. Wisdom and Marr Murray. London: Herbert and Daniel, 1912. VII, 335 pp. (also published in 1916 by Hodder and Stoughton, London—N.Y.—Toronto).
9. The duel. Excerpt from The hero of our own time. Transl. by T. Pulszky. — In: A Russian anthology in English. Ed. by C. E. B. Roberts. N. Y.: 1917, pp. 124–137.
10. A traveling episode. — In: Little Russian masterpieces. Transl. by Z. A. Ragozin. Vol. 1. N. Y.: Putnam, 1920, pp. 165–198. (an excerpt from the novel).
11. A hero of nowadays. Transl. by John Swinnerton Phillimore. London: Nelson, 1924.
12. Taman'. — In: Chamot A. Selected Russian short stories. Transl. by A. E. Chamot. London, 1925—1928, pp. 84—97.
13. A hero of our time. Transl. by Reginald Merton. Mirsky. London: Allan, 1928. 247 pp.
14. Fatalist. Story. Transl. by G.A. Miloradowitch. — In: Golden Book Magazine. Vol. 8. N. Y., 1928, pp. 491—493.
15. A hero of our own times. Transl. by Eden and Cedar Paul for the Lermontov centenary. London: Allen and Unwin, 1940. 283 pp. (also published by Oxford Univ. Press, London—N.Y., 1958).
16. Bela. Transl. by Z. Shoenberg and J. Domb. London: Harrap, 1945. 124 pp. (a dual language edition).
17. A hero of our time. Transl. by Martin Parker. Moscow: Foreign languages publ. house, 1947. 224 pp., ill. (republished in 1951 and 1956; also published by Collet's Holdings, London, 1957).
18. A hero of our time. A novel. Transl. by Vladimir Nabokov in collab. with Dmitri Nabokov. Garden City, N.Y.: Doubleday, 1958. XI, 216 pp. "Doubleday Anchor Books".
19. A hero of our time. Translated by Philip Longworth. With an afterword by William E. Harkins, London, 1964, & New York : New American Library, 1964
20. A Lermontov reader. Ed., transl., and with an introd. by Guy Daniels. New York: Grosset & Dunlap, 1965.
21. A hero of our time. Transl. with an introduction by Paul Foote. Harmondsworth, Middlesex: Penguin Books, 1966.
22. Major poetical works. Transl., with an introduction and commentary by Anatoly Liberman. Minneapolis: University of Minnesota Press, 1983.
23. Vadim. Transl. by Helena Goscilo. Ann Arbor: Ardis Publishers, 1984.
24. A hero of our time. Transl. by Martin Parker, revised and edited by Neil Cornwell, London: Dent, 1995
25. A hero of our time. Transl. by Marian Schwartz. Modern Library, 2004.
26. A hero of our time. Transl. with an introduction and notes by Natasha Randall; foreword by Neil LaBute. New York: Penguin, 2009.
27. A hero of our time. Transl. by Alexander Vassiliev, London: Alexander Vassiliev 2010. (a dual language edition).
28. A hero of our time. Transl. by Nicholas Pasternak Slater, Oxford World's Classics, 2013.

== See also ==
- Romanticism
- Tragic hero
