= Superfluous man =

Stock character in mid-19th century Russian literature

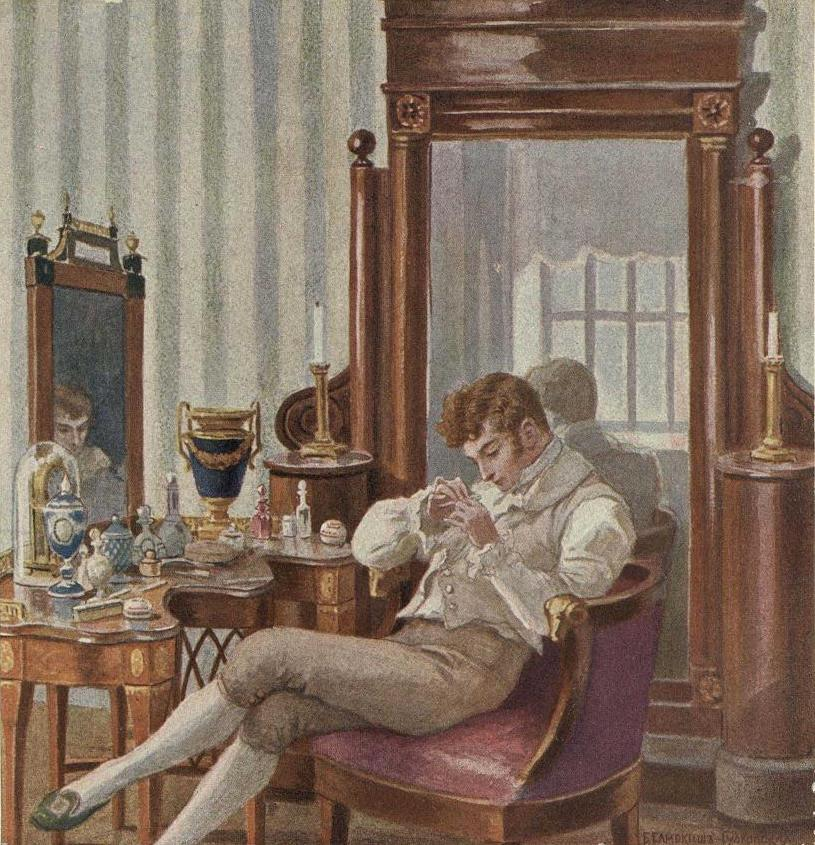
A superfluous man (Eugene Onegin) idly polishing his fingernails. Illustration by Elena Samokysh-Sudkovskaya, 1918

The superfluous man (Russian: лишний человек, líshniy chelovék, "extra person") is an 1840s and 1850s Russian literary concept derived from the Byronic hero. It refers to a man, perhaps talented and capable, who does not fit into social norms. In most cases, this person is born into wealth and privilege. Typical characteristics of the "superfluous man" are disregard for social values, cynicism, and ennui; typical behaviors include gambling, drinking, romantic intrigues and duels. He is often unmindful, indifferent or unempathetic with society's issues and can carelessly distress others with his actions, despite his position of power. He will often use his power for his own comfort and security, and will have very little interest in being charitable or using it for the greater good.

The character type originates in Alexander Pushkin's verse-novel Eugene Onegin (1825–1832). This term was popularized by Ivan Turgenev's novella The Diary of a Superfluous Man (1850) and was thereafter applied to characters from earlier novels. Mikhail Lermontov's A Hero of Our Time (1840) depicts another superfluous man – Pechorin – as its protagonist. He can be seen as a nihilist and fatalist. Later examples include Alexander Herzen's Beltov in Who Is to Blame? (1845–46), Turgenev's Rudin (1856), and the title character of Ivan Goncharov's Oblomov (1859).

Russian critics such as Vissarion Belinsky (1811–1848) viewed the superfluous man as a byproduct of Nicholas I's reign, when the best-educated men would not enter the discredited government service but, lacking other options for self-realization, would instead doom themselves to live out their life in passivity. The radical critic Nikolay Dobrolyubov (1836–1861) analyzed the superfluous man as by-product of Russian serfdom. Scholar David Patterson describes the superfluous man as "not just ... another literary type but ... a paradigm of a person who has lost a point, a place, a presence in life" before concluding that "the superfluous man is a homeless man."

== See also ==
- Dandy
- Failson
- Male expendability
- Remittance man
- Socialite
