= Golda Madden =

American actress (1886–1960)

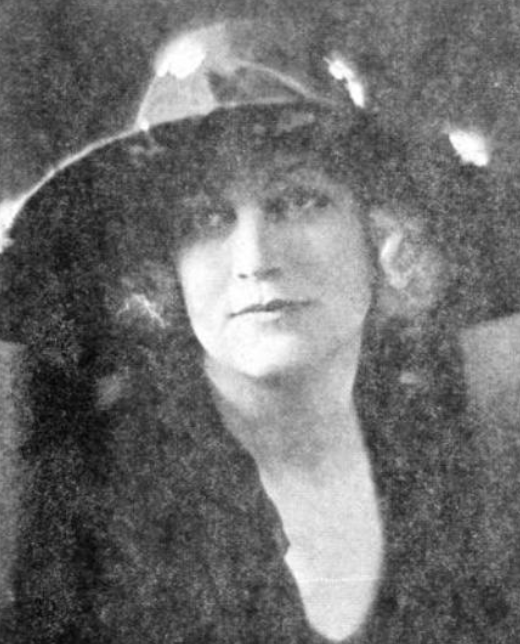
- Golda Madden, from a 1922 publication
- Born: July 17, 1886; Red Cloud, Nebraska, US
- Died: October 26, 1960 (aged 74); Los Angeles, California, US
- Occupation: Actress
- Relatives: Harold Lloyd (cousin)

Golda Madden (July 17, 1886 – October 26, 1960) was an American actress active during Hollywood's silent era.

== Biography ==
Madden was born in Red Cloud, Nebraska, in 1886. She was a first cousin of actor/director Harold Lloyd on her mother's side. She began appearing in plays in Chicago in the early 1910s and was signed to Mack Sennett's Keystone in 1916. She retired from acting in the early 1920s and afterward enjoyed a rich social life, serving as president of the Velada Club—a women's group—in Hollywood. She also served as production manager for the Little Theater of Beverly Hills in the 1930s.

== Selected filmography ==
- The Marshal of Moneymint (1922)
- The Branded Four (1920)
- The Mother of His Children (1920)
- The Woman in Room 13 (1920)
- Lombardi, Ltd. (1919)
- The Girl of My Dreams (1918)
- Let's Go (1918)
- A Gasoline Wedding (1918)
- Beat It (1918)
- Jilted Janet (1918)
- The Lamb (1918)
- We Never Sleep (1917)
- Flying Colors (1917)
- Over the Fence (1917)
- Fires of Rebellion (1917)
- Lonesome Luke's Lively Life (1917)
- The Return of John Boston (1916)
