= We Never Sleep (film) =

1917 film

- Written by: H. M. Walker
- Produced by: Hal Roach
- Starring: Harold Lloyd
- Music by: Hans Rott
- Release date: December 2, 1917
- Country: United States
- Languages: Silent; English intertitles

We Never Sleep is a 1917 American short comedy film featuring Harold Lloyd. It is Lloyd's last film as his "Lonesome Luke" character, and is considered a lost film.

== Cast ==
- Harold Lloyd as Lonesome Luke
- Snub Pollard
- Bebe Daniels
- Gilbert Pratt
- Fred C. Newmeyer
- Billy Fay
- Bud Jamison
- Charles Stevenson (as Charles E. Stevenson)
- Sammy Brooks
- David Voorhees
- Virginia Baynes
- Dorothea Wolbert
- Max Hamburger
- Gus Leonard
- Ruth Churchill
- Golda Madden
- Estelle Harrison
- Ray Braxton
- John Gardner
- Ardulus Bixby
- Rudolph Bylek
- William Blaisdell
- Marie Mosquini
- Evelyn Page
- Nina Speight
- Walter Stile
- Harry Todd
- Margaret Joslin (as Margaret Joslin Todd)

== Reception ==
In a review on December 1, 1917, Motion Picture News, wrote that the film "makes an average comedy number—average for Rolin—considerably above it remembering the ordinary product of the day."
