= The Power of a Lie =

1922 film

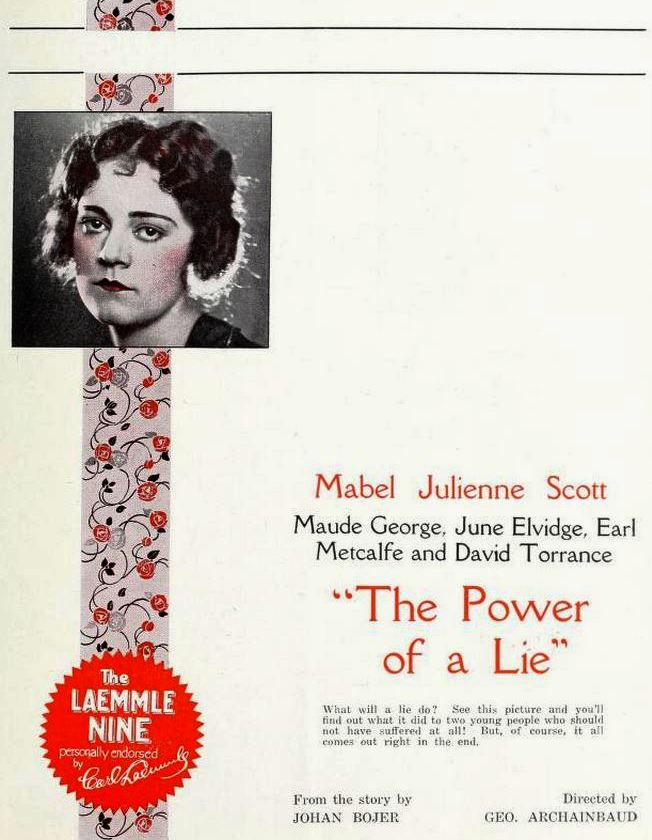
- Advertisement
- Directed by: George Archainbaud
- Screenplay by: Charles Kenyon
- Based on: The Power of a Lie by Johan Bojer
- Starring: Mabel Julienne Scott; David Torrence; Maude George; Ruby Lafayette; Earl Metcalfe; June Elvidge
- Cinematography: Charles J. Stumar
- Production company: Universal Pictures
- Distributed by: Universal Pictures
- Release dates: December 24, 1922 (Chicago); January 7, 1923 (United States)
- Running time: 50 minutes
- Country: United States
- Language: Silent (English intertitles)

The Power of a Lie is a 1922 American drama film directed by George Archainbaud and written by Charles Kenyon. It is based on the 1908 novel The Power of a Lie by Johan Bojer. The film stars Mabel Julienne Scott, David Torrence, Maude George, Ruby Lafayette, Earl Metcalfe, and June Elvidge. The film was released on January 7, 1923, by Universal Pictures.

== Plot ==
As described in a film magazine, Richard Burton (Metcalfe), engaged to Betty (Scott), the sister of his friend John Hammond (Torrence), has led a drunken and generally dissipated existence. Despite his wife Joan's (George) injunction to let Richard shift for himself, John resolves to give Richard a final chance to become respectful. He endorses Richard's note for $10,000 to let the latter start an architectural business. Richard hopes that by hard work and success to win back Betty, who has broken their engagement. Betty's determination to drop Richard is the result of her reading of a wild orgy in which he took part. John was also present at the occasion as that was when he endorsed Richard's note. In order to shield his reputation, John evades his wife's question regarding the financial aid given Richard and denies that he was at the party. John's lie leads to a big social scandal with Richard branded as a forger, and a number of complications result. One lie leads to another, and it is not until a trial takes place that vindicates Richard is the tangle straightened out. Richard reestablishes himself in Betty's favor.

== Cast ==
- Mabel Julienne Scott as Betty Hammond
- David Torrence as John Hammond
- Maude George as Joan Hammond
- Ruby Lafayette as Mrs. Hammond
- Earl Metcalfe as Richard Burton
- June Elvidge as Lily Cardington
- Phillips Smalley as Jeremiah Smith
- Stanton Heck as Mr. Lawrence
- Winston Miller as Julian Hammond

== Preservation ==
With no copies of The Power of a Lie located in any film archives, it is a lost film.
