= The Diary of a Superfluous Man =

1850 novella by Ivan Turgenev

- Author: Ivan Turgenev
- Original title: Дневник лишнего человека
- Language: Russian
- Subject: superfluous man
- Genre: novella, epistolary
- Set in: Moscow and rural Russia, early 19th century
- Publisher: Otechestvennye Zapiski
- Publication date: 1850
- Publication place: Russian Empire
- Dewey Decimal: 891.733
- LC Class: PG3421 .D58
- Original text: Дневник лишнего человека at Russian Wikisource
- Translation: The Diary of a Superfluous Man at Wikisource

The Diary of a Superfluous Man (Russian: Дневник лишнего человека, Dnevník líshnego chelovéka) is an 1850 novella by the Russian author Ivan Turgenev. It is written in the first person in the form of a diary by a man, Tchulkaturin, who, though only 31 years old, is dying of an unspecified illness and has only a few days left to live as he recounts incidents of his life. The story has become the archetype for the Russian literary concept of the superfluous man. It was first published in 1850 in the Saint Petersburg literary magazine Otechestvennye Zapiski.
