= The Burning Trail =

1925 film

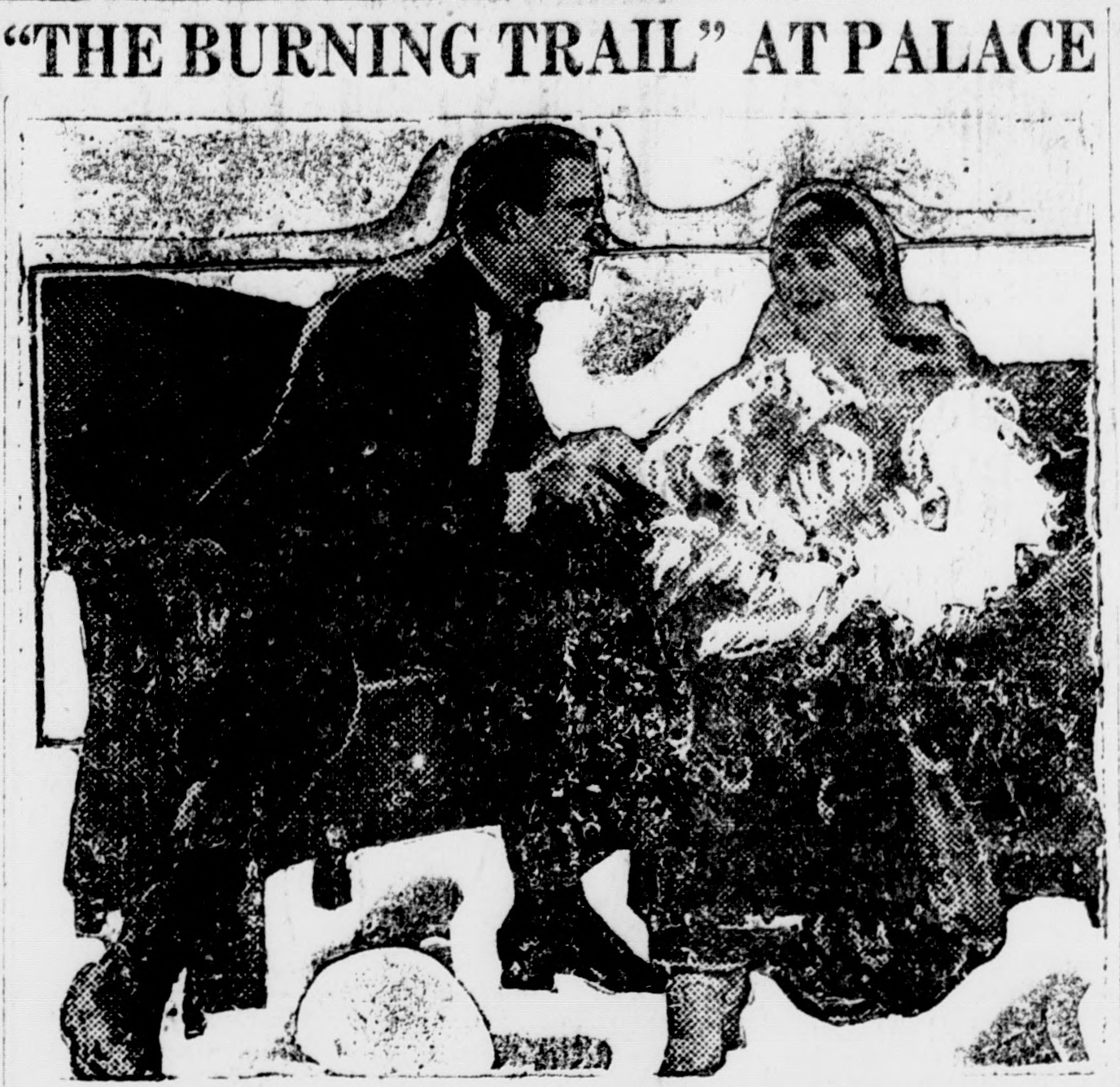
- Newspaper publicity for the film
- Directed by: Arthur Rosson
- Written by: Isadore Bernstein
- Based on: Sundown Slim by Henry H. Knibbs
- Starring: William Desmond; Albert J. Smith; Mary McIvor
- Cinematography: Gilbert Warrenton
- Production company: Universal Pictures
- Distributed by: Universal Pictures
- Release date: May 10, 1925
- Running time: 50 minutes
- Country: United States
- Languages: Silent; English intertitles

The Burning Trail is a 1925 American silent Western film directed by Arthur Rosson and starring William Desmond, Albert J. Smith, and Mary McIvor. After accidentally killing a man in a fight, a boxer heads West.

== Plot ==
As described in a film magazine review, Smiling Bill wanders west to forget that he killed a man in the boxing ring, and goes into the desert. Meanwhile, he has incurred the enmity of Texas, a bad man. Texas gets a job at the Corliss ranch. Texas attempts to show the younger Corliss boy how to get stock across a neighboring sheepman's land. However, the boy loves the sheepman's daughter and does not want to stir up strife with him. A fight breaks out just as Bill arrives at the Corliss ranch, and he goes for the sheriff. Before the sheriff arrives, the elder Corliss is killed. Bill rescues the sheepman's daughter and another young woman.

== Cast ==
- William Desmond as Smiling Bill Flannigan
- Albert J. Smith as Texas
- Mary McIvor as Nell Loring
- Jim Corey as Black Loring
- Jack Dougherty as John Corliss
- Edmund Cobb as Tommy Corliss
- Dolores Rousse as Esther Ramsey
- Harry Tenbrook as Reginald Cholmondeley
- Janet Gaynor as Extra

== Preservation ==
With no holdings located in archives, The Burning Trail is considered a lost film.
