= Ashes of Hope =

1917 film

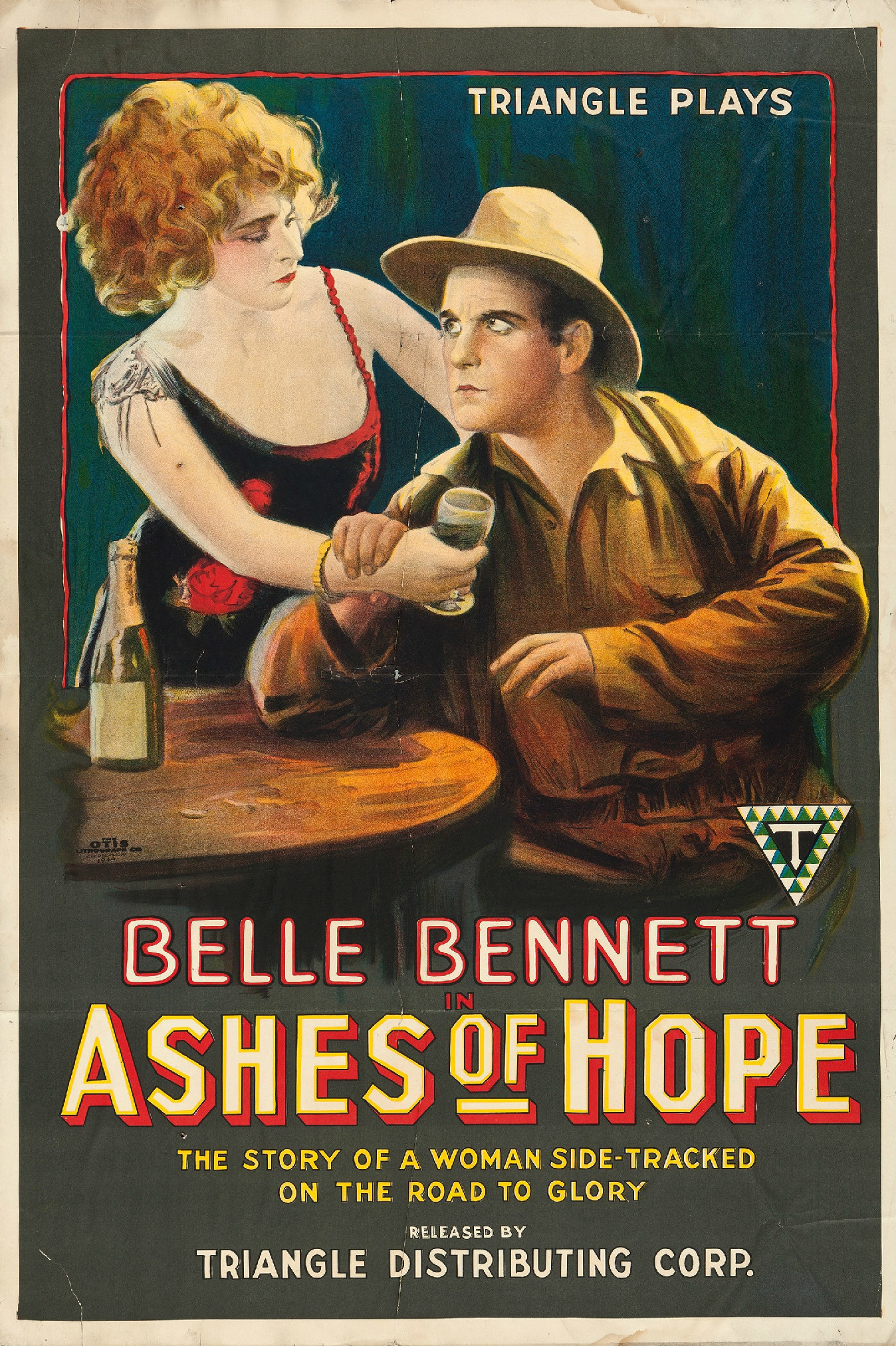
- Theatrical release poster
- Directed by: Walter Edwards
- Written by: Thomas H. Ince
- Produced by: Triangle Studios
- Cinematography: Gus Peterson
- Distributed by: Triangle Film Corporation
- Release date: October 7, 1917
- Running time: 5 reels
- Country: United States
- Languages: Silent; English intertitles

Ashes of Hope is a 1917 American silent Western film directed by Walter Edwards and starring Belle Bennett. It was produced and released by the Triangle Film Corporation.

== Cast ==
- Belle Bennett as Gonda
- Jack Livingston as Jim Gordon
- Jack Richardson as 'Ace High' Lawton
- Percy Challenger as Flat Foot
- Josie Sedgwick as Belle

== Preservation status ==
An incomplete print is held by the Library of Congress.
