= The Mother of His Children =

1920 film

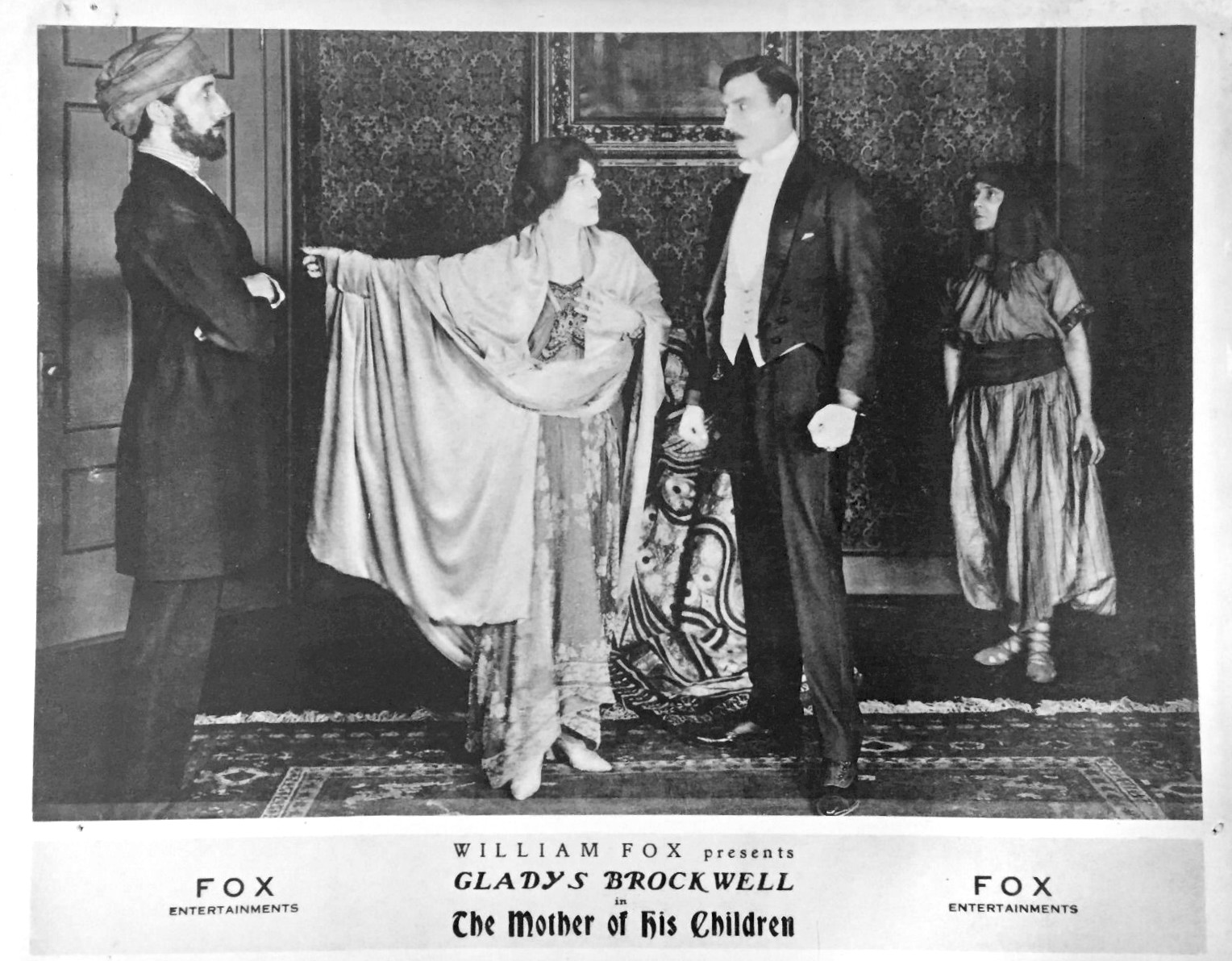
- Lobby card
- Directed by: Edward LeSaint
- Written by: Charles J. Wilson (scenario) (as Charles Wilson)
- Story by: Barbara La Marr
- Starring: Gladys Brockwell; William Scott; Frank Leigh; Nigel De Brulier; Golda Madden; Nancy Caswell
- Cinematography: Harry B. Harris
- Production company: Fox Film Corporation
- Distributed by: Fox Film Corporation
- Release date: April 1920
- Running time: 5 reels; 50 minutes
- Country: United States
- Languages: Silent film (English intertitles)

The Mother of His Children is a lost 1920 American silent drama film directed by Edward LeSaint and starring Gladys Brockwell, William Scott, Frank Leigh, Nigel De Brulier, Golda Madden, and Nancy Caswell. The film was released by Fox Film Corporation in April 1920.

== Cast ==
- Gladys Brockwell as Princess Yve
- William Scott as Richard Arnold
- Frank Leigh as Count Tolstoff
- Nigel De Brulier as Hadji
- Golda Madden as Beatrice Arnold
- Nancy Caswell as Helen
- Jean Eaton as Bobbie

== Preservation ==
The film is now considered lost.

== See also ==
- 1937 Fox vault fire
