= Mary McIvor =

American actress

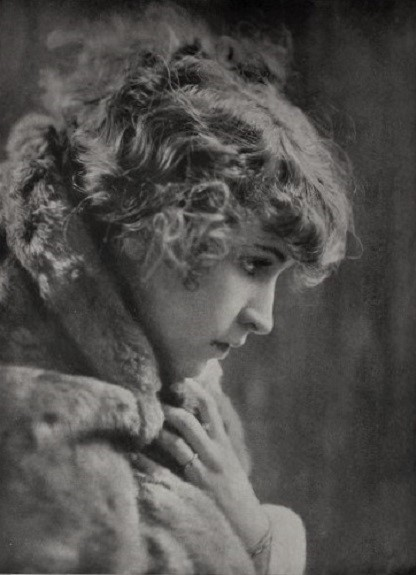
- Born: Mary Ellsworth McKeever; August 31, 1897; Barnesville, Ohio, US
- Died: February 28, 1941 (aged 43); Los Angeles, California, US
- Occupation: Actress
- Spouse: William Desmond (1919 - 1941, her death)
- Children: 2

Mary McIvor (born Mary Ellsworth McKeever) (August 31, 1897 – February 28, 1941) was an American actress who was active during Hollywood's silent era. She was married to serial star William Desmond.

== Biography ==
Mary was born in Barnesville, Ohio, to Elmer McKeever and Bertha Bentley. Her father died six months before she was born.

After moving west, she found work in Hollywood as an actress in Westerns at Triangle, eventually becoming the leading lady for William S. Hart. Her first starring role as Lady Maryska in 'Paddy O'Hara', directed by Walter Edwards, and starred her future husband action cowboy hero, William Desmond whom she married on March 22nd, 1919 when she was only 24, and he was 41 years old, after becoming his personal secretary. Mary more or less retired from acting in 1920, the year the couple's first daughter Mary Joanna was born. Their second daughter, Elizabeth Terry Anne, was born in 1932.

McIvor's health began to sharply decline around 1930. As a result, the family spent time at a beach cottage in her home state in 1932; during their trip, McIvor wandered off and was reported missing. In April 1939, Desmond reported his wife missing again from their apartment in Los Angeles; she was found wandering the streets of Hollywood nine days later and subsequently treated by doctors for amnesia. The pair remained married until she died of a heart attack in 1941.

== Partial filmography ==
- The Burning Trail (1925)
- The Right Man (1929)
- In His Brother's Place (1919)
- Chasing Rainbeaux (1919)
- The Mints of Hell (1919)
- Gambling in Souls (1919)
- The Sudden Gentleman (1917)
- A Phantom Husband (1917)
- Flying Colors (1917)
- The Square Deal Man (1917)
- Paddy O'Hara (1917)
