= Paddy O'Hara (film) =

1917 film

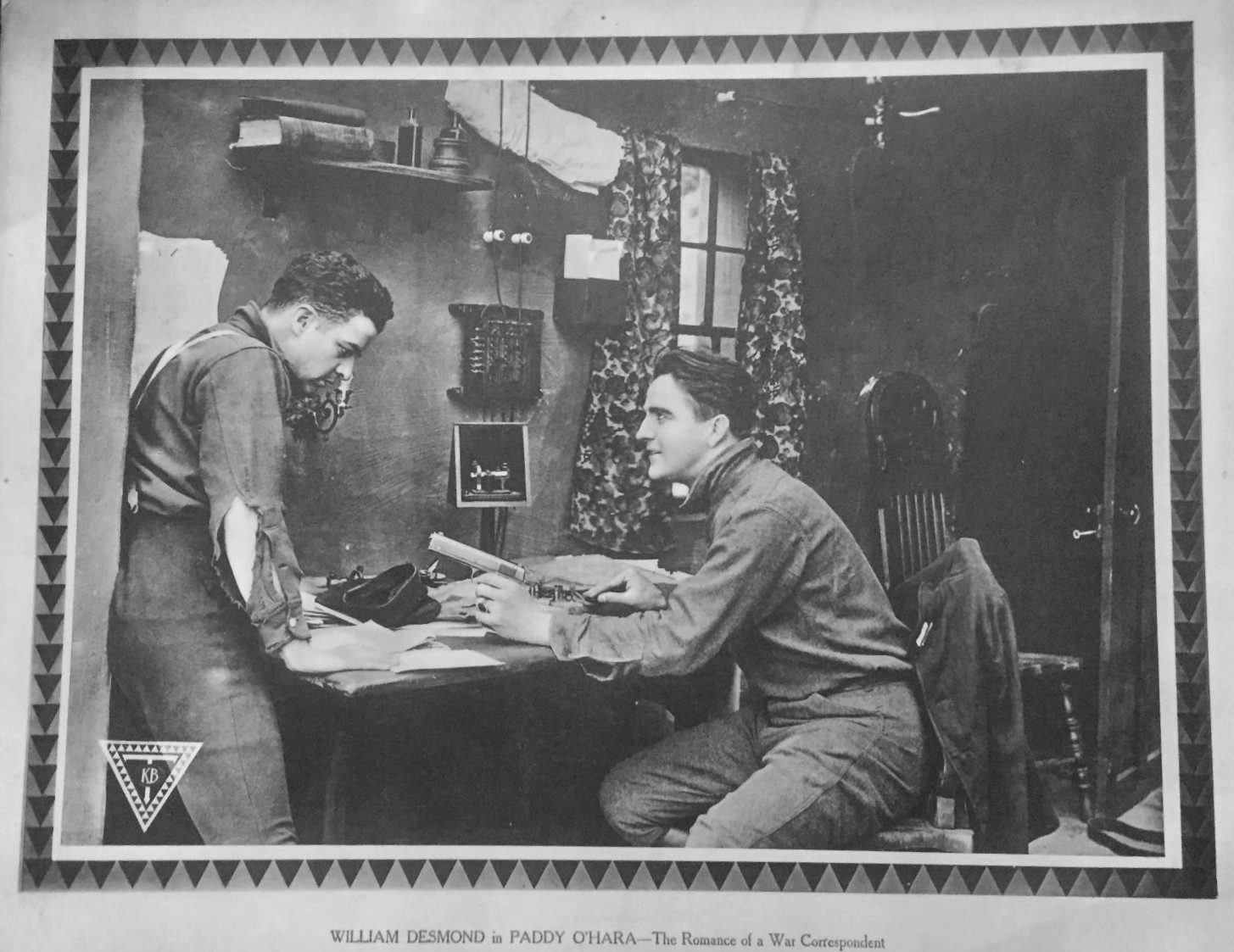
- Directed by: Walter Edwards
- Written by: J.G. Hawks
- Produced by: Thomas H. Ince
- Starring: William Desmond; Mary McIvor; Robert McKim
- Production companies: Kay-Bee Pictures; New York Motion Picture
- Distributed by: Triangle Distributing
- Release date: April 15, 1917
- Country: United States
- Languages: Silent; English intertitles

Paddy O'Hara is a 1917 American silent adventure film directed by Walter Edwards and starring William Desmond, Mary McIvor and Robert McKim. The film's sets were designed by the art director Robert Brunton.

== Cast ==
- William Desmond as Paddy O'Hara
- Mary McIvor as Lady Maryska
- Robert McKim as Count Carlos
- Joseph J. Dowling as Count Ivan of Darbaya
- Walt Whitman as The Monk

== Bibliography ==
- Robert B. Connelly. The Silents: Silent Feature Films, 1910-36, Volume 40, Issue 2. December Press, 1998.
