= Romantic hero =

Literary archetype referring to a character who rejects established norms

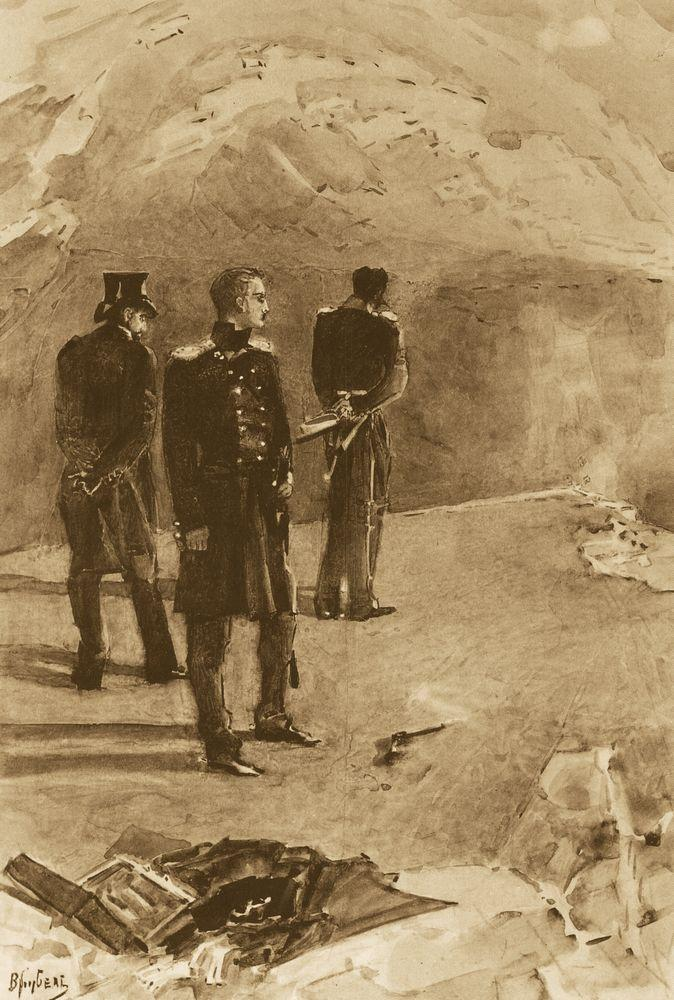
Grigory Pechorin from Mikhail Lermontov's novel A Hero of Our Time (1840)

The Romantic hero is a literary archetype referring to a character that rejects established norms and conventions, has been rejected by society, and has themselves at the center of their own existence. The Romantic hero is often the protagonist in a scholarly work, and the primary focus is on the character's thoughts rather than their actions.

== Characteristics ==
Literary critic Northrop Frye noted that the Romantic hero is often "placed outside the structure of civilization and therefore represents the force of physical nature, amoral or ruthless, yet with a sense of power, and often leadership, that society has impoverished itself by rejecting". Other characteristics of the Romantic hero include introspection, the triumph of the individual over the "restraints of theological and social conventions", wanderlust, melancholy, misanthropy, alienation, and isolation. However, another common trait of the Romantic hero is regret for their actions, and self-criticism, often leading to philanthropy, which stops the character from ending romantically.

Usually estranged from his more grounded, realist biological family and leading a rural, solitary life, the Romantic hero may nevertheless have a long-suffering love interest, him or herself victimised by the hero's rebellious tendencies, with their fates intertwined for decades, sometimes from their youths to their deaths. (See Tatyana Larina, Elizabeth Bennet, Eugenie Grandet, et al.)

Romantic heroes and similar characters were popularly used in Gothic fiction in Britain and elsewhere.

== History ==
The Romantic hero first began appearing in literature during the Romantic period, in works by such authors as Byron, Keats, Goethe, and Pushkin, and is seen in part as a response to the French Revolution. As Napoleon, the "living model of a hero", became a disappointment to many, the typical notion of the hero as upholding social order began to be challenged.

== Examples ==
Classic literary examples of the Romantic hero include:

- Captain Ahab from Herman Melville's novel, Moby-Dick
- The titular character in Samuel Taylor Coleridge's poem, The Rime of the Ancient Mariner
- Andrei Bolkonsky in Leo Tolstoy's novel, War and Peace
- Ponyboy Curtis in S.E. Hinton's novel, The Outsiders
- Edmond Dantès in Alexandre Dumas (père)'s adventure novel, The Count of Monte Cristo
- Mr. Darcy in Jane Austen's novel, Pride and Prejudice
- Victor Frankenstein in Mary Shelley's novel, Frankenstein
- The titular characters in Lord Byron's narrative poems Don Juan and Childe Harold's Pilgrimage
- Gwynplaine in Victor Hugo's novel, The Man Who Laughs
- "Hawkeye" (Natty Bumppo) in James Fenimore Cooper's Leatherstocking Tales pentalogy of historical novels
- Philip Marlowe in Raymond Chandler's seven novels about the Los Angeles detective
- The titular character in Pushkin's novel in verse, Eugene Onegin
- Hester Prynne in Nathaniel Hawthorne's novel, The Scarlet Letter
- The titular character in François-René Chateaubriand's novella, René
- Werther in Goethe's epistolary, loosely autobiographical novel, The Sorrows of Young Werther
- Faust in Goethe's Faust

== See also ==
- Anti-hero
- Byronic hero
- Gothic fiction
- List of fictional anti-heroes
- Romanticism
- Tragic flaw
- Epic hero
