= Judge Her Not =

1921 film

- Directed by: George Edwardes-Hall
- Written by: George Edwardes-Hall
- Starring: Jack Livingston; Pauline Curley; Harry von Meter
- Production company: Harmony Film Company
- Distributed by: Sunnywest Films
- Release date: July 9, 1921
- Running time: 50 minutes
- Country: United States
- Languages: Silent; English intertitles

Judge Her Not is a 1921 American silent Western film directed by George Edwardes-Hall and starring Jack Livingston, Pauline Curley and Harry von Meter.

== Cast ==
- Jack Livingston as Ned Hayes
- Pauline Curley as May Harper
- Viola Dolan as Goldy Spencer
- Noel Kennon as Spuds
- Harry von Meter as Rob Ferris
- Hector Dion as Henry Don
- Florence Murth as Jane Don
- Ruth Wunderlich as Meg
- Helen Gilmore as Jerusha Spriggins
- Harriet Jackson as Anastasia Hooper (gossiper)
- Howard Crampton as Ogden Holmes
- William White as Zach Tuttle

== Bibliography ==
- Connelly, Robert B. The Silents: Silent Feature Films, 1910-36, Volume 40, Issue 2. December Press, 1998.
- Munden, Kenneth White. The American Film Institute Catalog of Motion Pictures Produced in the United States, Part 1. University of California Press, 1997.
