= Peter L. Thorslev Jr. =

American historian (1929-2011)

- Born: October 17, 1929; Harlan, Iowa, U.S.
- Died: October 13, 2011 (aged 81); Burbank, California, U.S.
- Occupation: Literary scholar
- Awards: Guggenheim Fellowship (1965)

Academic background
- Education: Dana College; University of Minnesota
- Thesis: The Byronic Hero: Types and Prototypes (1959)

Academic work
- Sub-discipline: Romantic-era literature
- Institutions: Northwestern University; University of California, Los Angeles

Peter Larsen Thorslev Jr. (October 17, 1929 – October 13, 2011) was an American literary scholar. A 1965 Guggenheim Fellow, he wrote two books on Romantic-era literature: The Byronic Hero (1962) and Romantic Contraries (1984). He was one of the first openly LGBT academics at the University of California, Los Angeles.

== Biography ==
Thorslev was born on October 17, 1929, in Harlan, Iowa. His father Peter Larsen Thorslev emigrated from Denmark and worked as a minister in Canada, before becoming pastor of the United Evangelical Lutheran Church in Kennard, Nebraska. Later moving to Kennard, he obtained his BA from Dana College in 1950.

He did graduate studies at the University of Minnesota, obtaining his MA in 1957 and PhD in 1959; his doctoral dissertation was titled The Byronic Hero: Types and Prototypes. After spending one year at Northwestern University as an English instructor (1959-1960), he moved to the University of California, Los Angeles as assistant professor of English. In 1966, he was promoted to associate professor.

Thorslev specialized in Romantic-era literature. In 1962, he published The Byronic Hero, a monograph on the character archetype of the same name. In 1965, he was awarded a Guggenheim Fellowship "for a study of free will and determinism in the Romantic period". Another book in the field, Romantic Contraries, was published in 1984.

Thorslev was gay, reportedly being one of the first UCLA faculty members to come out. He chaired the UCLA senate's academic freedom committee. In 1988, he voiced concern about the state of the International Gay and Lesbian Archives (now part of the ONE National Gay & Lesbian Archives) after they lost their original storage space due to financial issues.

Thorslev died on October 13, 2011, at Providence Saint Joseph Medical Center in Burbank, California. He was cremated and interred at St. James' Episcopal Church, Los Angeles, while a funeral took place on October 20 at St. Matthew's Lutheran Church in North Hollywood.

== Bibliography ==
- The Byronic Hero (1962)
- Romantic Contraries (1984)
