= The Golden Trail (1920 film) =

1920 film

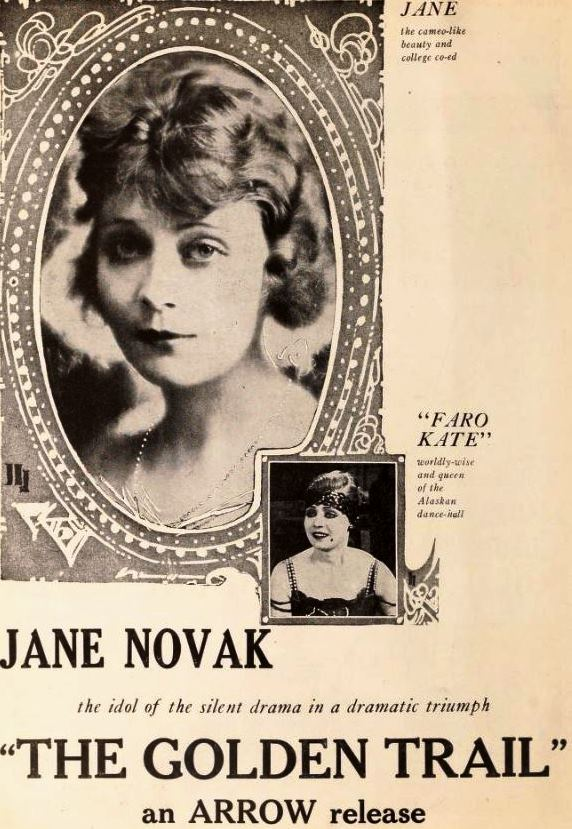
- Directed by: Jean Hersholt; Lewis H. Moomaw
- Screenplay by: Elizabeth Mahoney
- Starring: Jane Novak; Jack Livingston; Jean Hersholt
- Cinematography: Clyde Cook; Hal Mohr
- Production company: The American Lifeograph Company
- Distributed by: Arrow Films
- Release date: August 1920

The Golden Trail is an American silent drama film released in 1920. Directed by Jean Hersholt and Lewis H. Moomaw, the script was written by Elizabeth Mahoney.

== Plot ==
Jane Novak starred in two roles within the film: first as "Faro," queen of an Alaskan gambling hall, and second as Jane Sunderlin, a college student, beloved mascot of her college's football team.

== Cast ==
- Jane Novak as "Faro" Kate / Jane Sunderlin
- Jack Livingston as Dave Langdon
- Jean Hersholt as Harry Teal
- Bert Sprotte as Jim Sykes
- Otto Matieson as Dick Sunderlin
- Al Ernest Garcia as Jean the Half-Breed
- Broderick O'Farrell as Bill Lee

== Production ==
The film—set primarily in Alaska—was produced by the American Lifeograph Company, an independent outfit based in Portland, Oregon (where the film was shot).
