= Rose Melville =

American actress

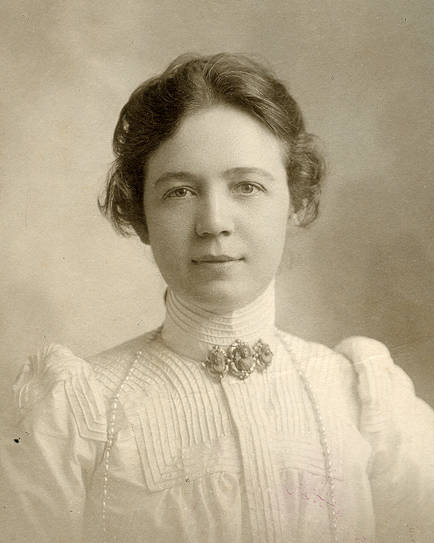
- Melville c. 1903
- Born: Rosa Smock; January 30, 1867; Terre Haute, Indiana, U.S.
- Died: October 8, 1946 (aged 79); Lake George, New York, U.S.
- Occupation: Actress
- Years active: 1889-1920s
- Spouse: Harry Hardy (m. 1889; div. 1902) Frank Minzey (m. 1910–1946)

Rose Melville (January 30, 1867 (Note: Historian Mike McCormick notes that biographies of Melville consistently give a birth year of 1873, which is inconsistent with 1870 census data.) – October 8, 1946) born Rosa Smock, was an American stage actress famous for playing one character her whole career, "Sis Hopkins".

Rosa Smock was born in Terre Haute, Indiana, the youngest of four daughter of Rev. Jacob Smock, a Baptist pastor, and Caroline (Puett) Smock. Her three elder sisters were also actors who toured as the Melville Sisters in the 1880s. Rose attended St. Mary-of-the-Woods and Franklin College.

Rose got her start in 1889 at Zanesville, Ohio, playing a male role in a play called Queen's Evidence. Other known plays she appeared in were Uncle Tom's Cabin, The Two Orphans and Fanchon the Cricket.

Mellville and her sister Ida formed a traveling stock company. In 1894 a play called Zeb was produced in which Melville performed the Sis Hopkins character for the first time. The play was so successful that it was brought to New York that same year. The Sis Hopkins character appeared in three more plays Little Christopher, The Prodigal Father;1896–97 and By the Sad Sea Waves; 1898–99. Melville presented Sis Hopkins in Vaudeville in a sketch called Sis Hopkins' Visit. After this sketch she had it rewritten as a longer play called Sis Hopkins. It was this play that garnered her greatest fame and she eventually performed it over 5,000 times.

In 1916 the Kalem Company contracted with Rose Melville to make twenty-one short films all with Melville starring in her Sis Hopkins character. She dispensed with the Sis Hopkins character briefly in the 20s to play in two feature films in 1922 and 1923. In 1918 Goldwyn Pictures produced a feature film version of the Sis Hopkins play starring Mabel Normand. The film is now lost.

Melville was twice married: first to theatrical manager Harry Hardy from 1889 to 1902, and secondly, in 1910, to actor Frank Minzey. She died in 1946 at her home in Lake George, New York.
