= Who Is to Blame? =

Novel by Alexander Herzen

Who is to Blame?
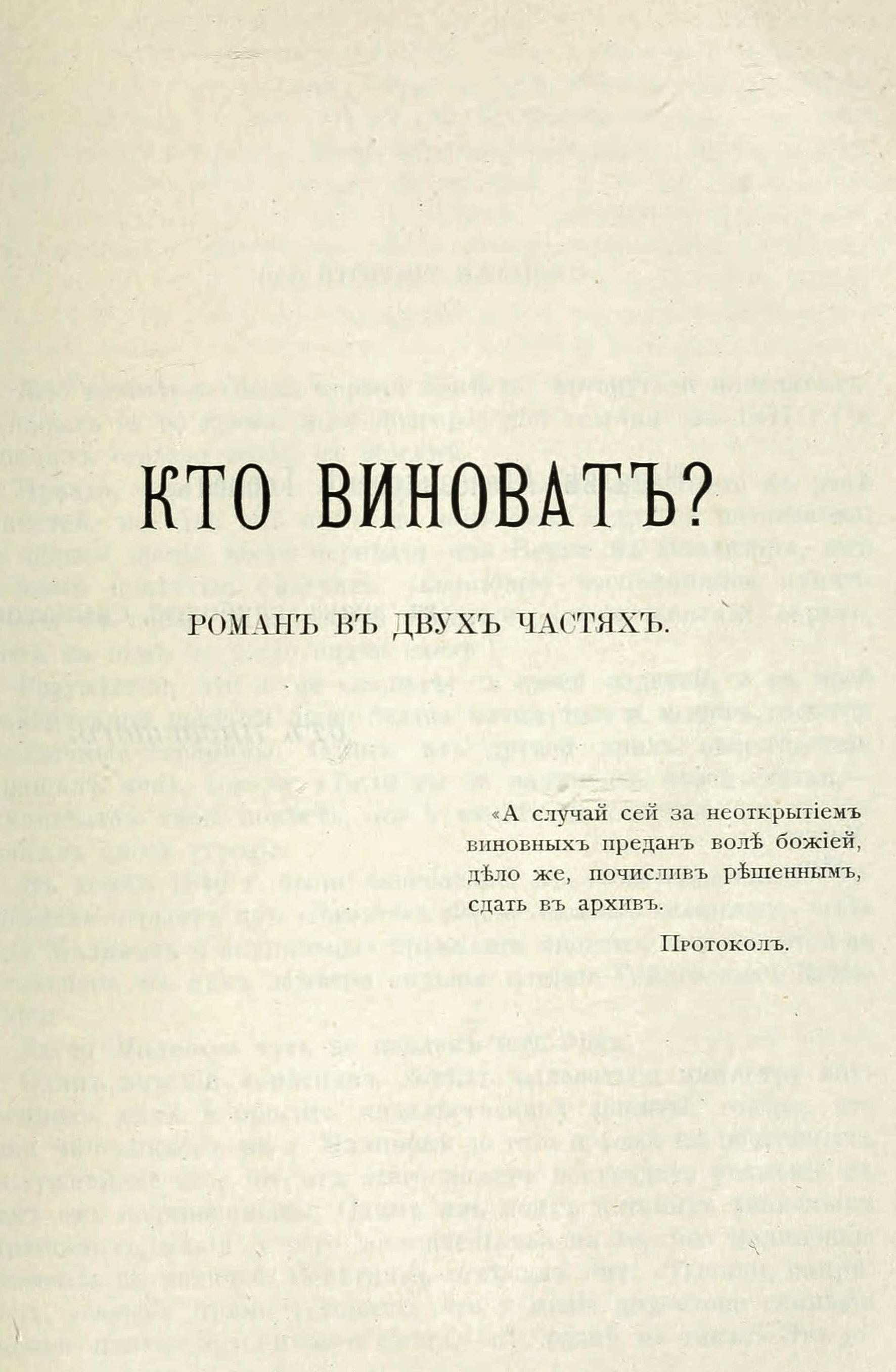
- 1905 half-title page
- Author: Alexander Herzen
- Original title: Кто виноват?
- Translator: Michael R Katz
- Language: Russian
- Publisher: Otechestvennye Zapiski
- Publication date: 1845-46
- Publication place: Russia

Who is to Blame? (Russian: Кто виноват?) is an 1845-6 novel by Alexander Herzen. It is about Dmitry Krutsifersky, a poor man, whose happy marriage to a rich landowner's illegitimate daughter, Lyubov, is destroyed when a wealthy, idle young man, Beltov (the Russian "superfluous man" stock character), begins an affair with her.

== History ==
Who is to Blame? was first published in the journal Otechestvennye Zapiski (1845-1846), with some cuts by the censor. It was published in book form in 1847. It was the first purely "social" novel in Russian literature. Vissarion Belinsky remarked that the novel was artistically weak but was valuable as a social and psychological evaluation of contemporary Russian life.

== Plot ==
In part one Dmitry Krutsifersky, the poor son of a provincial doctor, is hired to tutor the son of the rich landowner Negrov. Krutsifersky eventually marries Negrov's illegitimate daughter Lyubov. In part two Krutsifersky and Lyubov are happily married with a child. Their happiness is destroyed when a rich young landowner named Beltov becomes a friend of the family and begins an illicit relationship with Lyubov. Beltov ends up departing Russia for Europe, leaving the young couple with a broken and hopeless marriage.

Part one is a satire of the Russian landed gentry, showing their coarseness and pettiness. Part two introduces the type of the "superfluous man" in the person of Beltov.

== English translations ==
- Who is to Blame? : A Novel in Two Parts, Translated by Margaret Wettlin, Progress Publishers, Moscow, 1978
- Who Is to Blame?: A Novel in Two Parts, Translated by Michael R. Katz, Cornell University Press, 1984. ISBN 0-8014-9286-6
