= Sis Hopkins (1919 film) =

1919 film by Clarence G. Badger

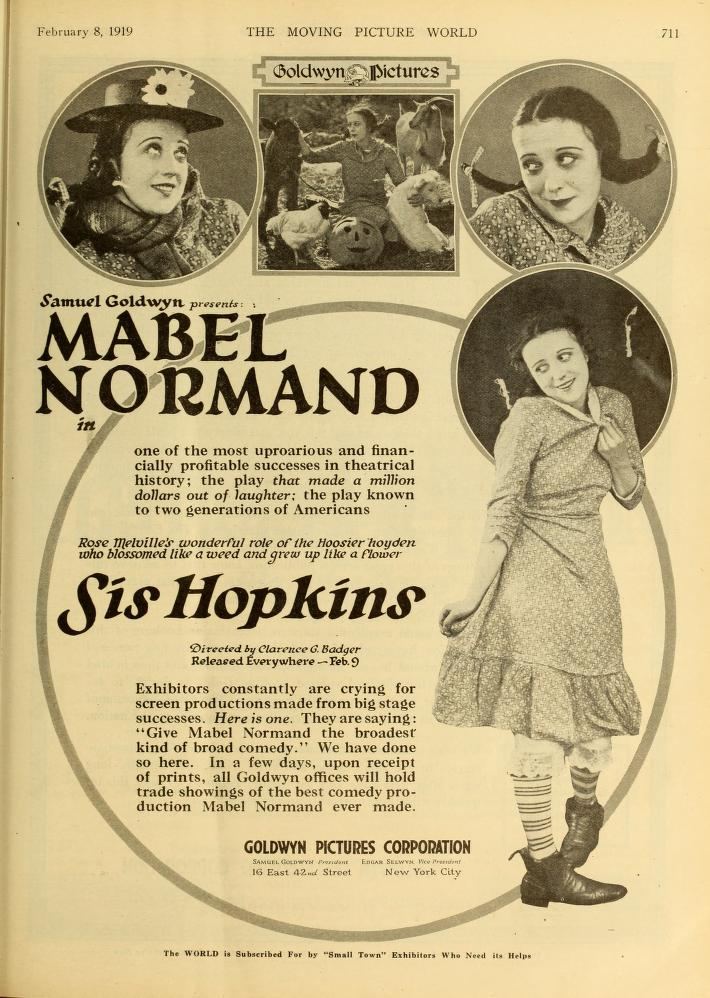
- 1919 magazine advertisement
- Directed by: Clarence G. Badger
- Starring: Mabel Normand
- Distributed by: Goldwyn Pictures Corporation
- Release date: March 2, 1919
- Running time: 50 minutes
- Country: United States
- Language: Silent

Sis Hopkins is a 1919 comedy film directed by Clarence G. Badger and starring Mabel Normand. The supporting cast features John Bowers and Sam De Grasse. The plot involves an unsophisticated and eccentric country girl who comes to the city to stay with wealthy relatives. Initially they underestimate her because she behaves so differently.

Based on a play made famous by Rose Melville, the film was released by the Goldwyn Pictures Corporation on March 2, 1919 with a running time of 50 minutes. It is not known whether the film currently survives, and it may be a lost film. It was subsequently remade in 1941 under the same title with hillbilly comedian Judy Canova playing Normand's role.

== Cast ==
Mabel Normand ... Sis Hopkins
John Bowers ... Ridy Scarboro
Sam De Grasse ... Vibert
Thomas Jefferson ... Pa Hopkins
Nick Cogley ... Ridy's Father
Eugenie Forde ... Miss Peckover
