= Tailspin Tommy in the Great Air Mystery =

- Directed by: Ray Taylor
- Written by: Raymond Cannon (screenplay); Ella O'Neill; Basil Dickey; Robert Hershon; George H. Plympton; Hal Forrest (comic strip)
- Produced by: Henry MacRae
- Starring: Clark Williams; Jean Rogers; Noah Beery, Jr.
- Cinematography: Richard Fryer; Leonard Galezio; John Hickson; William A. Sickner
- Edited by: Albert Akst; Saul A. Goodkind; Alvin Todd; Edward Todd
- Music by: David Klatzkin; Clifford Vaughan; Oliver Wallace
- Distributed by: Universal Pictures
- Release date: March 5, 1935
- Running time: 12 chapters (300 min)
- Country: United States
- Language: English

Tailspin Tommy in the Great Air Mystery is a 12-episode 1935 Universal movie serial based on the Tailspin Tommy comic strip by Hal Forrest and starring Clark Williams, Jean Rogers and Noah Beery, Jr. The picture was the 96th of the 137 serials released by the studio (the 28th of which to be made with sound). (Note: Along with Mascot Pictures, the lowly "poverty row" studio, Universal Pictures became the only major studio committed to the serial format in the 1930s.)

== Plot ==
"Tailspin" Tommy (Clark Williams) and his fellow pilots, Betty Lou Barnes (Jean Rogers) and Skeeter Milligan (Noah Beery, Jr.) prevent a group of corrupt businessmen from stealing Nazil Island's oil reserves. The villains are Manuel Casmetto (Herbert Heywood), the half-brother of Don Alvarado Casmetto, Nazil Island's ruler and villainous oil tycoon Horace Raymore (Matthew Betz).

Tommy and his friends are aided in their efforts by news reporter Bill McGuire (James P. Burtis). Milt Howe (Pat J. O'Brien), a masked mystery plot known as The Eagle and El Condor stands in their way. When Tommy is triumphant, he also finds he has a movie contract.

== Chapter titles ==
1. Wreck of the Dirigible
2. The Roaring Fire God
3. Hurled from the Skies
4. A Bolt from the Blue
5. The Torrent
6. Flying Death
7. The Crash in the Clouds
8. Wings of Disaster
9. Crossed and Double Crossed
10. The Dungeon of Doom
11. Desperate Chances
12. The Last Stand

_{Source:}

== Cast ==
- Clark Williams as "Tailspin" Tommy Tompkins
- Jean Rogers as Betty Lou Barnes, one of "Tailspin" Tommy's companions
- Delphine Drew as Inez Casmetto
- Noah Beery, Jr. as Skeeter Milligan, one of "Tailspin" Tommy's companions
- Bryant Washburn as Ned Curtis, Betty's uncle and a heroic oil tycoon
- Pat J. O'Brien as Milt Howe
- Herbert Heywood as Manuel Casmetto
- Matthew Betz as Horace Raymore
- Paul Ellis as Enrico Garcia, Don Casmetto's secretary and Manuel Casmetto's henchman
- Harry Worth as Don Alvarado Casmetto
- Manuel López as Gomez
- Charles A. Browne as Paul Smith
- James P. Burtis as Bill McGuire, a reporter
- Frank Mayo as the Dirigible Captain
- Frank Clarke as a flyer, (billed as "Air Ace Frank Clark")

== Production ==
Tailspin Tommy in the Great Air Mystery used a number of aircraft including a Fleet biplane, a Stearman C3 and a Fairchild cabin monoplane. A mock-up of a dirigible included an interior section. Although Nazil was in South America, all the location shooting took place in California with the Wilson airport as a staging area.

=== Stunts ===
- Frank Clarke, stunt pilot
- George DeNormand

== Reception ==
Tailspin Tommy in the Great Air Mystery is considered to be an improvement on the previous Tailspin Tommy serial.

In the review for Turner Classic Movies, the author wrote, "'Tailspin Tommy in the Great Air Mystery '(1935) sees our three cheerful pilots foiling a conspiracy in the Latin American country of Nazil, where American gangsters have conspired with an usurper to steal the country's oil reserves. Making use of considerable new flying footage, the serial opens with an impressive dirigible crash. Tommy (Clark Williams), Betty Lou (Jean Rogers) and Skeeter (Noah Beery, Jr.) must fight a masked flier called the 'Double-X Pilot,' who leads a rogue fighter squadron based from a secret jungle fortress. Our heroes are occasionally aided by a mysterious aviator known as 'El Condor,' whose 'Eagle Plane' appears and disappears into an artificial cloud."
