= Stunt Pilot =

1939 American film

- Theatrical release poster
- Directed by: George Waggner
- Screenplay by: Scott Darling; George Waggner
- Based on: Tailspin Tommy by: Hal Forrest; Glenn Chaffin
- Produced by: Paul Malvern
- Starring: John Trent; Marjorie Reynolds; Milburn Stone; Jason Robards Sr. Pat O'Malley; George Meeker
- Cinematography: Fred Jackman Jr.
- Edited by: Carl Pierson
- Music by: Frank Sanucci
- Production company: Monogram Pictures
- Distributed by: Monogram Pictures
- Release date: July 2, 1939
- Running time: 61 minutes
- Country: United States
- Language: English

Stunt Pilot is a 1939 American adventure film directed by George Waggner and written by Scott Darling and George Waggner. The film is based on the comic strip Tailspin Tommy by Hal Forrest and Glenn Chaffin. Stunt Pilot stars John Trent, Marjorie Reynolds, Milburn Stone, Jason Robards Sr., Pat O'Malley and George Meeker. Following the success of Mystery Plane (1939), Stunt Pilot, the second in the "Tailspin Tommy" series, was released on July 2, 1939, by Monogram Pictures.

== Plot ==
While working as a stunt pilot for Hollywood director Sheehan, Tailspin Tommy suspects that his aircraft was sabotaged to get authentic crash footage. He quits his job, and Earl Martin, a reckless pilot, replaces Tommy.

After Martin crashes his aircraft while flying with Tommy's sweetheart, Betty Lou Barnes, Tommy becomes enraged. Sheehan, needing a pilot to perform a dangerous dogfight with Martin, convinces Tommy's pal Skeeter to take the job. Skeeter is desperate to raise money to pay for his sister's operation.

Tommy, afraid for his friend's life, kidnaps Skeeter and flies in his place. During the dog fight, Tommy's machine gun is loaded with real bullets, and he shoots down Martin before realizing his gun is not shooting blanks. He is arrested on the charge of murder. Tommy remembers an argument he overheard between Martin and Sheehan, and is sure that the director is behind the murder. He takes off after Sheehan's train.

Meanwhile, the sheriff is after Tommy, until Skeeter finds photographs that show Sheehan replacing the bullets in Tommy's machine gun. Sheehan's train is stopped and the sheriff obtains Sheehan's confession that he killed Martin because the pilot had stolen the affections of his wife and then deserted her.

== Cast ==
- John Trent as Tailspin Tommy Tompkins
- Marjorie Reynolds as Betty Lou Barnes
- Milburn Stone as "Skeeter" Milligan
- Jason Robards Sr. as Paul Smith
- Pat O'Malley as Sheehan
- George Meeker as Earl Martin
- Wesley Barry as Glenn
- George Cleveland as Sheriff
- John Daheim as Tex
- Tod Sterling as Charlie
- Mary Field as Ethel
- Buddy Cox as Bobby
- Forrest Taylor as Doctor
- David Newell as Radio Operator
- Carleton Young as Reporter Trent
- Ray Turner as The Porter
- Jack Kirk as Crewman

== Production ==
Monogram Pictures, with the assistance of Paul Mantz, lined up an impressive number of aircraft to be used in Stunt Pilot:

- SPAD XIII c/n S-248, NX18968
- Fokker D.VII c/n 504/17, N6268
- Garland-Lincoln LF-1
- Nieuport Ni.28 N10415 and N8539
- Waco CTO
- Royal Aircraft Factory S.E.5 c/n AS-22-296
- Ryan STA c/n 128, NC16037
- Stearman C3R c/n 5013, NC670K
- Travel Air 2000 c/n 257, NC3557
- Douglas DC-3

Principal photography on Stunt Pilot, with stunt flying by Wally West, began on May 20, 1939, at the Metropolitan Airport, Los Angeles. Additional stock footage was obtained from Hell's Angels (1930). (Note: John Trent, as LaVerne Browne was a pilot for TWA flying Douglas DC-2s.)

== Reception ==
Aviation film historian Michael Paris in From the Wright Brothers to Top Gun: Aviation, Nationalism, and Popular Cinema recognized many "film within a film" elements in Stunt Pilot that would later appear in modern classics such as The Great Waldo Pepper (1975).
