= Akst (surname) =

Akst is a surname. Notable people with the surname include:

- Albert Akst (1899 – 1958) American musician and film actor
- Harry Akst (1894 – 1963) American songwriter
