= Sky Patrol =

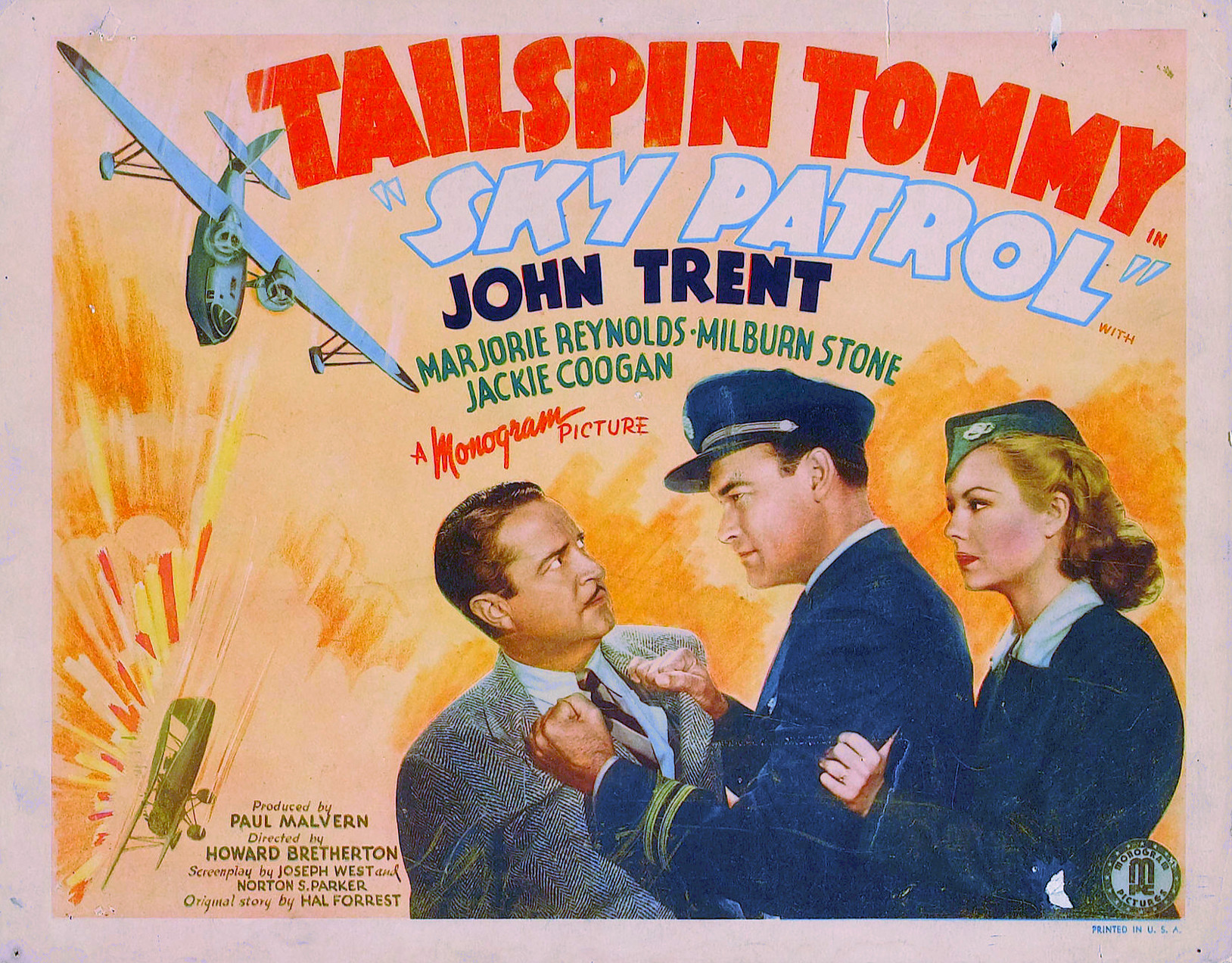
- Lobby card
- Directed by: Howard Bretherton
- Written by: Hal Forrest (comic strip "Tailspin Tommy" and story); George Waggner (screenplay) and Norton S. Parker
- Produced by: Paul Malvern
- Starring: John Trent; Marjorie Reynolds; Milburn Stone; Jason Robards Sr. Jackie Coogan
- Cinematography: Fred Jackman Jr.
- Edited by: Carl Pierson
- Production company: Monogram Pictures
- Release date: September 12, 1939
- Running time: 61 minutes
- Country: United States
- Language: English

Sky Patrol is a 1939 American film directed by Howard Bretherton and starring John Trent, along with Marjorie Reynolds, Milburn Stone and Jason Robards Sr. The film also featured actor and comedian Jackie Coogan, who began his film career as a child actor in silent films.

Sky Patrol is based on the comic strip Tailspin Tommy by Hal Forrest and Glenn Chaffin. (Note: John Trent, as LaVerne Browne was a pilot for TWA flying Douglas DC-2s.) The third of four "Tailspin Tommy" films made by Monogram Pictures, Sky Patrolwas released on September 12, 1939.

== Plot ==
In the final flying test for Sky Patrol graduation, instructor Tailspin Tommy Thompson flies with the son of flight commander Colonel Meade. Carter Meade freezes during target practice but Tommy covers for him and he graduates.

When Bainbridge, a weapons smuggler, is aware that the Sky Patrol will disrupt his smuggling operations. Carter sees an unidentified amphibious aircraft but is unable to fire on it and is shot down by Bainbridge, who takes him prisoner.

Carter is presumed dead but Tommy and Skeeter Milligan locate a warehouse where the amphibious aircraft is hidden. Tracking the unknown aircraft to a ship rendezvous, Tommy and Skeeter try to get on board but are captured and locked up with Carter.

Monitoring the Sky Patrol radio, the smugglers learn the colonel and the Sky Patrol are heading for the ship. Tommy manages to set up explosives in the hold, and when the three prisoners are about to jump ship, Carter shoots a smuggler, ensuring their escape. The Colonel soon overpowers the rest of Bainbridge's men.

Tommy and Skeeter return to their commercial airline jobs, leaving Carter now in charge of the Sky Patrol.

== Cast ==
- John Trent as Tailspin Tommy Tomkins
- Marjorie Reynolds as Betty Lou Barnes
- Milburn Stone as Skeeter Milligan
- Jackie Coogan as Carter Meade
- Jason Robards Sr. as Paul Smith, Three Points Airfield Owner
- Bryant Washburn as Bainbridge
- Boyd Irwin as Colonel Meade
- LeRoy Mason as Mitch
- Hans Joby as Jackson
- John Daheim as Ryan
- Dickie Jones as Bobbie

== Production ==
Principal photography for Sky Patrol took place at the Los Angeles Metropolitan Airport, from July 24 to late September 1939.

The aircraft used in Sky Patrol include:

- Douglas Dolphin 1
- Travel Air 2000
- Travel Air 4000
- Waco GXE

== Reception ==
Aviation film historian Stephen Pendo in Aviation in the Cinema (1985) saw Sky Patrol delving into familiar territory of "flying police". Earlier, Criminals of the Air (1937). Death in the Sky (also known as Pilot X) (1937), Reported Missing (1937), Mysterious Pilot (film serial) (1937 and Secret Service of the Air (1939) all dealt with similar scenarios of air police fighting criminals both on the ground and in the air.
