= Richard Fryer (cinematographer) =

Cinematographer

- Born: Morris Kolsky; 25 December 1894; London, England
- Died: 9 February 1953 (aged 58); Washington, D.C., USA
- Other name: Dick Fryer
- Occupation: Cinematographer
- Years active: 1918–1945

Richard Fryer (25 December 1894 – 9 February 1953), born Morris Kolsky, was a British-born Hollywood cinematographer.

== Background ==
Fryer was born Morris Kolsky in London in 1894, the son of tailor Marks Kolsky and his wife Annie. On 14 May 1911, at the age of 18, he arrived in New York on board the ship "Majestic"; he was already showing his occupation as cinematographer as shown on the ship's manifest. In 1928, when he applied for naturalization he was recorded as a motion picture cameraman living at 6600 Whitley Avenue (Hollywood Heights), Los Angeles. He married Celia Wolf and together they had two daughters, Doris Mae Fryer in 1919 and Gloria Jean Fryer in 1925.

== Career ==
He was a prolific cinematographer who mainly worked on film serials. He is known for the serials Perils of Pauline, Tailspin Tommy, Flash Gordon and Black Arrow.

== Filmography ==
- Peeks at Hollywood (short) (1945)
- Black Arrow (1944 serial, as director of photography)
- Voice in the Wind (1944, as Dick Fryer)
- Marines in the Making (1942 documentary short)
- Flaming Frontiers (1938 serial, uncredited)
- Swing It, Sailor! (1938)
- Wild West Days (1937 serial)
- Secret Agent X-9 (1937 serial)
- Squadron of Doom (1937, TV movie) (archive footage)
- Ace Drummond (1936 serial)
- Flash Gordon (1936 serial)
- The Adventures of Frank Merriwell (1936 serial)
- Tailspin Tommy in the Great Air Mystery (1935 serial)
- Stormy (1935)
- The Roaring West (1935 serial)
- The Call of the Savage (1935 serial)
- Rustlers of Red Dog (1935 serial)
- Tailspin Tommy (1934 serial)
- The Red Rider (1934 serial)
- The Vanishing Shadow (1934 serial)
- Pirate Treasure (1934 serial)
- The Perils of Pauline (1933 serial) (B&W and talkie)
- Bucking the Truth (1926) (B&W and silent)
- Dangerous Innocence (1925)
- The Clean Up (1923)
- Legally Dead (1923)
- For You My Boy (1923)
- Forbidden Love (1921)
- The Miracle of Money (1920)
- His Daughter Pays (1918)
