= Reynold Brown =

American painter (1917-1991)

- Born: William Reynold Brown; October 18, 1917; Los Angeles, California, U.S.
- Died: August 24, 1991 (aged 73); Chadron, Nebraska, U.S.
- Known for: Illustration, painting
- Style: Realism

William Reynold Brown (October 18, 1917 – August 24, 1991) was an American realist artist who painted many Hollywood film posters. He was also briefly active as a comics artist.

== Biography ==
He attended Alhambra High School and refined his drawing under his teacher Lester Bonar. A talented artist, Brown met cartoonist Hal Forrest around 1936-37. Forrest hired Brown to ink (uncredited) Forrest's comic strip Tailspin Tommy. Norman Rockwell's sister was a teacher at Alhambra High, and Brown later met Rockwell who advised him to leave cartooning if he wanted to be an illustrator. Brown subsequently won a scholarship to the Otis Art Institute.

During World War II he worked as a technical artist at North American Aviation. There he met his wife, fellow artist Mary Louise Tejeda.

Following the war Brown drew numerous advertisements and illustrations for magazines such as Argosy, Popular Science, Saturday Evening Post, Boys' Life, Outdoor Life, and Popular Aviation. Brown also drew paperback book covers.

Brown taught at the Art Center College of Design where he met Misha Kallis, then an art director at Universal Pictures. Through Kallis, Brown began his film poster work, then did the artwork for dozens of film posters, including:

In 1953, Brown was one of the founders of the Society of Illustrators of Los Angeles.

== List of film posters ==
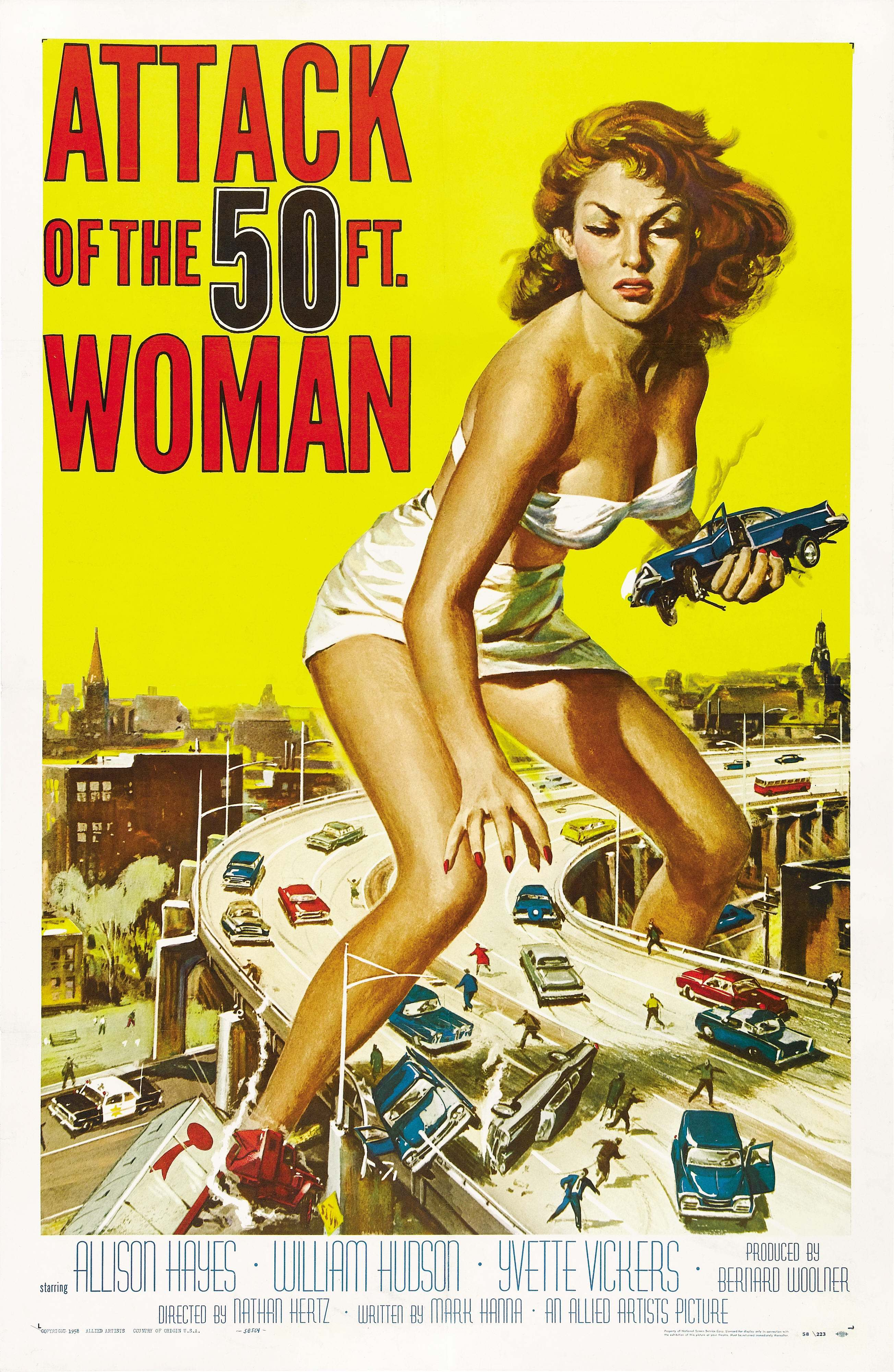
Brown's poster for Attack of the 50 Foot Woman (1958); part of this image was selected as the cover art for a 2009 book about Brown's art and life.

- Creature from the Black Lagoon (1954)
- Tarantula (1955)
- This Island Earth (1955)
- The Incredible Shrinking Man (1957)
- I Was a Teenage Werewolf (1957)
- Man of a Thousand Faces (1957)
- The Land Unknown (1957)
- Attack of the 50 Foot Woman (1958)
- Cat on a Hot Tin Roof (1958)
- Ben-Hur (1959)
- The Atomic Submarine (1959)
- House of Usher (1960)
- The Time Machine (1960)
- Spartacus (1960)
- Black Sunday (1960)
- The Alamo (1960)
- The Fabulous World of Jules Verne (1961)
- King of Kings (1961)
- The Big Wave (1962)
- How the West Was Won (1962)
- Mutiny on the Bounty (1962)
- Black Sabbath (1963)
- Godzilla vs. The Thing (1964)
- War of the Zombies (1964)
- Shenandoah (1965)
- Doctor Zhivago (1965)

Brown's original painting for the poster of The Alamo hung for many years at the actual Alamo in San Antonio, Texas.

== Later life and legacy ==
He suffered a severe stroke in 1976 that left his left side paralyzed and ended his commercial work. Brown and his family moved to Dawes County, Nebraska; with his wife's help, Brown continued to paint landscapes until his death in 1991.

In 1994, Mel Bucklin's documentary about Reynold Brown entitled The Man Who Drew Bug-Eyed Monsters was broadcast on U.S. public television. A book reproducing many of Brown's artworks, Reynold Brown: A Life in Pictures, was published in 2009.

Reynold Brown was inducted into the Society of Illustrators Hall of Fame in September 2023.
