= Danger Flight =

1939 film by Howard Bretherton

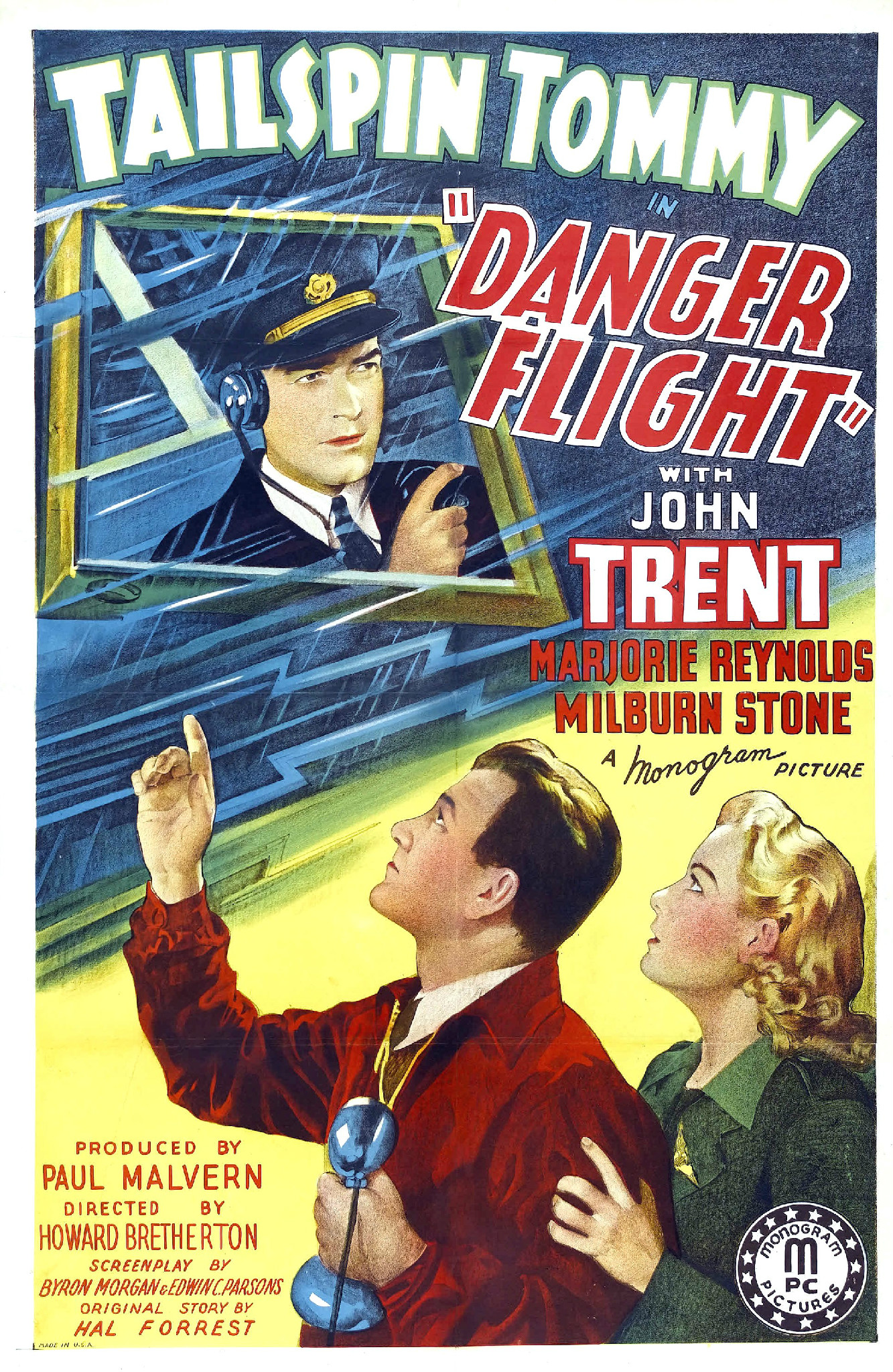
- Film poster
- Directed by: Howard Bretherton
- Written by: Hal Forrest (comic strip "Tailspin Tommy"); Byron Morgan (screenplay); Edwin C. Parsons (screenplay)
- Produced by: Paul Malvern
- Starring: John Trent; Marjorie Reynolds; Milburn Stone; Jason Robards Sr.
- Cinematography: Fred Jackman Jr.
- Edited by: Edward Schroeder
- Production company: Monogram Pictures
- Distributed by: Monogram Pictures
- Release date: November 1, 1939
- Running time: 65 minutes
- Country: United States
- Language: English

Danger Flight (aka Scouts of the Air) is a 1939 American film directed by Howard Bretherton and starring John Trent as Tailspin Tommy Tompkins, Marjorie Reynolds, Milburn Stone and Jason Robards Sr. The film featured young aviation enthusiasts in a model club.

Sky Patrol is based on the comic strip Tailspin Tommy by Hal Forrest and Glenn Chaffin. (Note: John Trent, as LaVerne Browne was a pilot for TWA flying Douglas DC-2s.) The final offering of four "Tailspin Tommy" films made by Monogram Pictures, Danger Flight, was released on November 1, 1939.

== Plot ==
Ace flyer "Tailspin" Tommy Tomkins (John Trent) starts a model flying club for young boys, to learn about aviation. When Mr. Brown (Joseph E. Bernard) receives a large payroll by aircraft, then by car, gangster Mike Lewis (Dennis Moore) and two gang members try to hold him up. Tommy agrees to carry the next payroll by small aircraft and then helps Mike's little brother Whitey (Tommy Baker), a tough orphan, get a model aircraft and join the model club.

On the night of a bad rain storm, Flight 14 (the payroll flight) is due to arrive with Brown's payroll, but an accident at a dam has Tommy flying to drop medical supplies. Tommy tries to land, but with zero visibility, he overshoots the field and crashes.

While search parties look for Tommy east of the airfield, Whitey is sure he knows where Tommy crashed and sends the boys out to search. After Whitey finds Tommy's wrecked aircraft, he sends his model aircraft up into the sky. Tommy's friends, Skeeter (Milburn Stone) and Betty Lou (Marjorie Reynolds), see Whitey's model aircraft and rescue Tommy.

Headlines praise Whitey's heroism and Mike introduces him to gang boss Dawson (Julius Tannen), a toy manufacturer who proposes a "Whitey Lewis" aircraft that features a secret code. Tommy helps Whitey invent a model aircraft to be used during emergencies that can sky-write using smoke signals.

When Flight 14 finally arrives with the payroll, Tommy takes it on his plane with him. The gangsters pretend to have a car accident and Whitey, worried his brother is hurt, sends a smoke signal to Tommy, who lands and is held up.

At first, Tommy believes Whitey is with the gangsters but then they are both taken hostage. In the basement of Dawson's cabin hideout, Tommy and Whitey repair Whitey's miniature model and send a smoke signal, spotted by a pilot overhead.

The police find Whitey's model and search for the hideout, but Tommy sends Whitey upstairs to escape. Whitey is caught, and when Dawson hurts his brother, he slugs Dawson, who shoots him.

The gang escapes by car but drives over a cliff. Tommy helps Whitey out of the cabin and later, Mr. Brown gives Whitey a scout uniform. The head of Whitey's school makes plans for an air scout troop that will soon become a national organization led by Tailspin Tommy.

== Cast ==
- John Trent as Tailspin Tommy Tompkins
- Marjorie Reynolds as Betty Lou
- Milburn Stone as Skeeter
- Jason Robards Sr. as Paul Smith
- Tommy Baker as Whitey Lewis
- Dennis Moore as Mike Lewis
- Julius Tannen as Dawson
- Eddie Parker as Williams
- Joseph E. Bernard as Brown
- Harry Harvey Jr. as Johnny
- Walter Wills as Cap
- Forrest Taylor appears uncredited as Police Radio Dispatcher.

== Production ==
Principal photography for Danger Flight took place at the Alhambra, California, airport, and began in early September 1939.

The aircraft used in Danger Flight include:

- Ryan STA c/n 105, NC14912
- Stinson A c/n 9107, NC15107
- Stinson SR

== Reception ==
Aviation film historian Stephen Pendo in Aviation in the Cinema (1985) saw Danger Flight as an interesting concept with a young boy "becoming involved in model aircraft building".
