= The Red Rider =

- Theatrical release poster
- Directed by: Lew Landers
- Written by: George H. Plympton; Vin Moore; Ella O'Neill; Basil Dickey; W. C. Tuttle
- Produced by: Milton Gatzert; Henry MacRae (associate)
- Starring: Buck Jones; Grant Withers; Marion Shilling; Walter Miller; Richard Cramer
- Cinematography: Richard Fryer
- Edited by: Saul A. Goodkind; Edward Todd; Joseph Gluck; Louis Sackin
- Music by: David Klatzkin; Al Short
- Distributed by: Universal Pictures
- Release date: July 16, 1934
- Running time: 15 chapters (310 min)
- Country: United States
- Language: English

The Red Rider is a 1934 American Western film serial from Universal Pictures and starring Buck Jones. It has 15 chapters based on the short story "The Redhead from Sun Dog" by W. C. Tuttle, and is a remake of Buck Jones' earlier 1931 film The Range Feud.

== Plot ==
Sheriff "Red" Davison, the sheriff of Sun Dog, is shocked when he hears his good friend "Silent" Slade has been accused of murdering a man named Scotty McKee. He feels that Slade was framed and denied a fair trial. When Slade is sentenced to hang, Red allows him to escape from jail, sacrificing his job and his good reputation in the process. Red and his horse Silver then follow Slade in an attempt to aid him in proving his innocence.

== Cast ==
- Buck Jones as "Red" Davidson
- Grant Withers as "Silent" Slade
- Marion Shilling as Marie Maxwell
- Walter Miller as Jim Breen
- Richard Cramer as Joe Portos
- Silver as Silver, Red's Horse
- Charles K. French as Robert Maxwell
- Margaret La Marr as Joan McKee
- Edmund Cobb as Johnny Snow
- Monte Montague as Bill Abel, one of Portos' henchmen
- Jim Thorpe as Al Abel, one of Portos' henchmen
- William Desmond as Sheriff Campbell
- Lee Beggs as Mayor "Soapy" Caswell
- Robert McGowan as Hubert Sund
- J. Frank Glendon as an Attorney

== Production ==
The Red Rider was based on the short story "The Redhead from Sun Dog" by W. C. Tuttle.

=== Stunts ===
- Cliff Lyons
- Tom Steele

== Chapter titles ==
1. Sentenced to Die
2. A Leap for Life
3. The Night Attack
4. A Treacherous Ambush
5. Trapped
6. The Brink of Death
7. The Fatal Plunge
8. The Stampede
9. The Posse Rider
10. The Avenging Trail
11. The Lost Diamonds
12. Double Trouble
13. The Night Raiders
14. In the Enemies' Hideout
15. Brought to Justice

_{Source:}

== See also ==
- List of film serials
- List of film serials by studio

Preceded by The Vanishing Shadow (1934)	Universal Serial; The Red Rider (1934)	Succeeded by Tailspin Tommy (1934)
