= She's No Lady =

1937 film by Charles Vidor

- Directed by: Charles Vidor
- Written by: James Edward Grant; George Bruce; Frank Partos
- Produced by: B.P. Schulberg
- Starring: Ann Dvorak; John Trent; Harry Beresford
- Cinematography: George T. Clemens
- Production company: Paramount Pictures
- Distributed by: Paramount Pictures
- Release date: August 12, 1937
- Running time: 70 minutes
- Country: United States
- Language: English

She's No Lady is a 1937 American comedy film directed by Charles Vidor and starring Ann Dvorak, John Trent and Harry Beresford. It was produced and distributed by Paramount Pictures.

== Cast ==
- Ann Dvorak as Jerry
- John Trent as Alden 'Bill' Carter III
- Harry Beresford as Uncle John
- Guinn 'Big Boy' Williams as Jeff
- Aileen Pringle as Mrs. Douglas
- Arthur Hoyt as Mr. Douglas
- Paul Hurst as Cop
- Wade Boteler as Captain of Jewel Squad
- Orville Caldwell as Inspector
- George Davis as Waiter
- Jean De Briac as Gustave
- Larry Fisher as House Detective
- Harry Fleischmann as 1st Officer
- Harry Holman as Colonel
- Thomas E. Jackson as 1st Detective
- Isabel La Mal as Secretary
- Peggy Langton as Patty Douglas
- Torben Meyer as Swedish Waiter
- Philip Morris as 2nd Officer
- Alex Novinsky as Escort
- Ralph Peters as Headwaiter
- Frank Puglia as Bartender
- William Royle as 2nd Detective
- Edwin Stanley as Butler
- Charles Sullivan as Taxi Driver

== Critical reception ==
Modern Screen’s Leo Townsend wrote, "Cops-and-robbers comedy melodrama, She's No Lady suffers from trite handling by director, players and scenarists. What emerges is decidedly minor entertainment, something you can see and forget almost at the same time … The performances of the two leads are disappointing, neither of them doing well with their supposedly sophisticated roles."

Variety wrote that the style attempted to be "breezy" but "the farce is too heavy-handed. Extreme deftness required to get away with that sort of thing is wholly lacking. It's a hodgepodge that's desperately trying to be flippantly sophisticated in the modern manner with John Trent struggling as a suave master-crook with wisecracks a la William Powell. But playing more like a radio hero - afternoon radio."

== About ==
She's No Lady was adapted from James Edward Grant’s original story “Let’s Talk of Love”. The film was George Bruce's first screenplay to hit the screen.

== Bibliography ==
- Jan-Christopher Horak. Lovers of Cinema: The First American Film Avant-garde, 1919-1945. Univ of Wisconsin Press, 1995.
