= Blossoms on Broadway =

1937 film by Richard Wallace

- Theatrical release poster
- Directed by: Richard Wallace
- Screenplay by: Theodore Reeves
- Produced by: B. P. Schulberg
- Starring: Edward Arnold; Shirley Ross; John Trent
- Cinematography: Leon Shamroy
- Music by: Friedrich Hollaender; Gordon Jenkins; John Leipold
- Production company: Paramount Pictures
- Distributed by: Paramount Pictures
- Release date: November 19, 1937
- Running time: 80 minutes
- Country: United States
- Language: English

Blossoms on Broadway is a 1937 American comedy film directed by Richard Wallace and starring Edward Arnold, Shirley Ross and John Trent. The film was released on November 19, 1937, by Paramount Pictures.

== Plot ==
Confidence trickster Ira Collins waylays a wealthy gold mine heiress on her arrival in New York City so he can have showgirl Sally Shea briefly take her place as one of his schemes.

== Cast ==
- Edward Arnold as Ira Collins
- Shirley Ross as Sally Shea
- John Trent as Neil Graham
- Rufe Davis as Sheriff Jeff Holloway
- Joe Weber as Weber
- Lew Fields as Fields
- William Frawley as Frances X. Rush
- Frank Craven as P.J. Quinterfield Sr.
- Kitty Kelly as 'Death Valley' Cora Keane
- Johnny Arthur as P.J. Quinterfield Jr.
- Edward Brophy as Mr. Prussic
- Charles Halton as Dr. Gilgallon
- Eddie Bartell as Eddie
- Jimmy Hollywood as Jimmy
- Frederick Clarke as Chester
