= The Great Gambini =

1937 film by Charles Vidor

- Theatrical release poster
- Directed by: Charles Vidor
- Screenplay by: Frederick J. Jackson; Frank Partos; Howard Irving Young
- Produced by: B. P. Schulberg
- Starring: Akim Tamiroff; Marian Marsh; John Trent; Genevieve Tobin; Reginald Denny; Roland Drew; William Demarest
- Cinematography: Leon Shamroy
- Edited by: Robert Bischoff
- Production company: Paramount Pictures
- Distributed by: Paramount Pictures
- Release date: June 25, 1937
- Running time: 70 minutes
- Country: United States
- Language: English

The Great Gambini is a 1937 American mystery film directed by Charles Vidor and written by Frederick J. Jackson, Frank Partos and Howard Irving Young. The film stars Akim Tamiroff, Marian Marsh, John Trent, Genevieve Tobin, Reginald Denny, Roland Drew and William Demarest. The film was released on June 25, 1937, by Paramount Pictures.

== Plot ==
Grant Naylor is unhappy because the woman he loves, Ann Randall, wants to instead marry Stephen Danby, a scoundrel. All are surprised during a performance of The Great Gambini when the magician predicts Ann and Danby will never be wed.

His prediction comes true when Danby's dead body is found. Sgt. Kirby questions all of Ann's family and Grant, and a piece of evidence points them to a man who was using a disguise. Grant believes the detective has the wrong man and discovers it's been Gambini himself all along. Gambini confesses on stage, but remains confident because Kirby's handcuffs might not be able to hold him.

== Cast ==
- Akim Tamiroff as The Great Gambini
- Marian Marsh as Ann Randall
- John Trent as Grant Naylor
- Genevieve Tobin as Nancy Randall
- Reginald Denny as William Randall
- Roland Drew as Stephen Danby
- William Demarest as Sergeant Kirby
- Edward Brophy as Butch
- Alan Birmingham as Lamb
- Lya Lys as Luba
- Ralph Peters as Bartender
