= Tailspin Tommy =

Comic strip, 1928-42

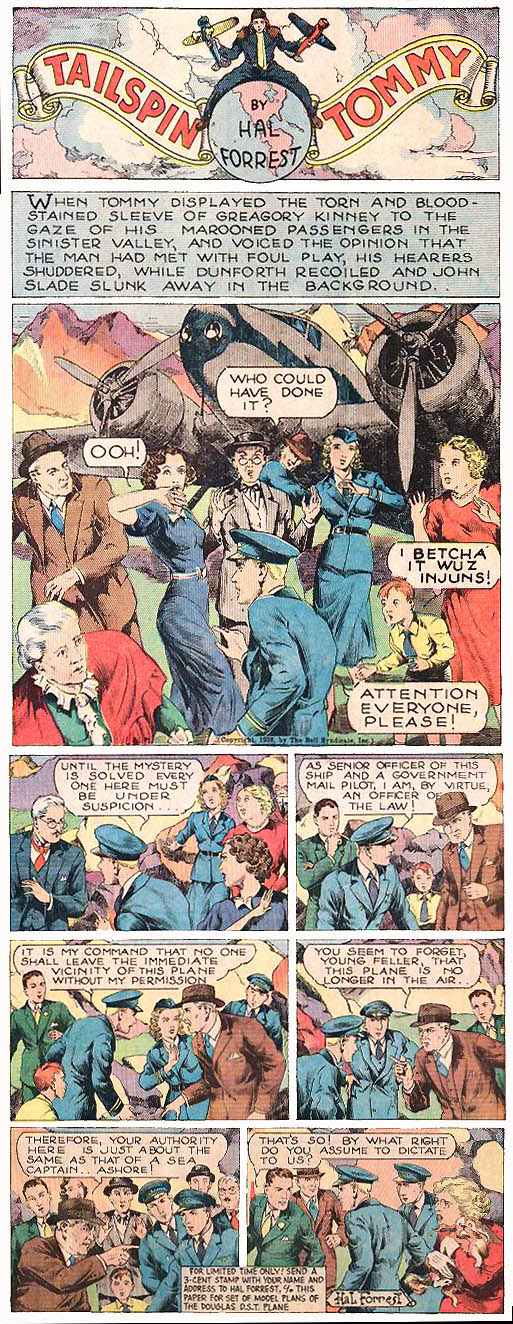
- Hal Forrest's Tailspin Tommy (June 26, 1938)
- Author: Glenn Chaffin (1928–1933) Hal Forrest (1933–1942)
- Illustrator(s): Hal Forrest (1928–1942) (inks) Reynold Brown (1936–1942)
- Current status/schedule: Concluded; reruns
- Launch date: May 21, 1928
- End date: March 15, 1942
- Syndicate(s): Bell Syndicate (1928–1940); United Feature Syndicate (1940–1942)
- Publisher(s): Stephen Slesinger Inc. Eastern Color Printing; Dell Comics
- Genre: Aviation-adventure

Tailspin Tommy was an aviation-adventure comic strip about a youthful pilot, "Tailspin" Tommy Tomkins (sometimes spelled Tompkins). Originally illustrated by Hal Forrest and initially distributed by John Neville Wheeler's Bell Syndicate and then by United Feature Syndicate, the strip had a 14-year run from May 21, 1928 to March 15, 1942.

In the wake of Charles Lindbergh's 1927 flight across the Atlantic, the public's fascination with aviation escalated. Tailspin Tommy was the first aviation-based comic strip to appear as a result of this heightened interest. The strip's 1928 launch was followed by others, notably Skyroads (1929-1942), Scorchy Smith (1930-1961), The Adventures of Smilin' Jack (1933-1973) and Flyin' Jenny (1939-1946).

== Publication history ==
Scripted by Glenn Chaffin, a newspaper journalist and press agent, Tailspin Tommy began its run in four newspapers on May 21, 1928. By 1931, it was published in more than 250 newspapers across the country. After buying out Chaffin's interest, Forrest took over the scripting; his first credited Sunday strip ran on January 7, 1934, and his first Sunday appeared on January 22. Forrest wrote and drew the strip solo for the next three years.

In 1936, Forrest took on an assistant, Reynold Brown, who inked (uncredited) over Forrest's pencils. Tailspin Tommy is held by some to have improved with Brown's contribution.

The Sunday page had several topper strips over the course of the run: Progress of Flight (1930-1933), Four Aces (1934-1941), How to Fly (1935), War Plane Insignia (1935) and Tailspin Tommy Flying Club (1935-1941).

== Characters and story ==
Living in Littleville, Colorado, young Tommy Tomkins had such an obsession with flying that he was given the nickname Tailspin Tommy before he ever actually went inside a plane. Although Tommy took an aero-engineering correspondence course, his real introduction to aviation happened when mail pilot Milt Howe made an emergency landing in a field near Tommy's neighborhood. Tommy watched the downward spiral of Milt's plane and ran to help. Howe rewarded Tommy with a greasemonkey job in Texas at the Three Point Airlines, where he soon became a pilot along with his girlfriend, Betty Lou Barnes, and his best buddy, Peter "Skeeter" Milligan. The trio eventually became part owners in Three Point and took off for many airborne adventures.

By 1940, Tailspin Tommy began to lose papers. A change in syndicates from Bell to United Features did little to help, and the strip ended on March 15, 1942.

== Film ==
Tailspin Tommy flew into movie theaters throughout the 1930s. He was portrayed by Maurice Murphy in the 12-episode 1934 movie serial Tailspin Tommy. Another 12-chapter serial, Tailspin Tommy in the Great Air Mystery (1935), starred Clark Williams in the title role. John Trent portrayed Tommy in a series of hour-long features, including Mystery Plane, Stunt Pilot, Sky Patrol and Danger Flight. All were released in 1939.

== Radio ==
A CBS radio series based on the comic strip aired briefly on the U.S. West Coast in 1941, although details are somewhat sketchy. Jack Arnold and Earl Hammond played the roles of "Tailspin" and "Skeeter". This 30-minute weekly show premiered on Friday, September 5, 1941 at 8:30 p.m., and originated from Los Angeles. In October it was switched to Sundays at 4:30 p.m.

There are also a couple of known 15-minute daily shows, but with unknown broadcast dates (if ever aired). At the end of one of these 15-minute episodes CBS announcer Wendell Niles states that the leads were played by Maurice Murphy and Noah Beery Jr., who were thus reprising their 1934 film roles as "Tailspin" and "Skeeter".

== Comic books and reprints ==
1933 Big Little Book

Stephen Slesinger Inc. published a series of 30 Tailspin Tommy Adventures in eight-page booklet form as a promotion with Big Thrill Chewing Gum. In 1936, C.J.H. Publications put out two issues of Tailspin Tommy Adventure Magazine. The magazines published adaptations of comic strip stories. Publication apparently ceased because the rights to the character had not been properly secured. After taking over the syndication, United Features published two Tailspin Tommy comic books, one in 1940 and one in 1946. Tailspin Tommy also saw reprints in Dell Comics' The Funnies and Popular Comics.

In 1934, Tailspin Tommy was among the strips reprinted in the first modern comic book, Famous Funnies, published by Max Gaines at Eastern Color Printing. That same year, Slesinger began publishing a series of Tailspin Tommy books in its Big Little Book line. Except where noted, beginning with Tailspin Tommy and the Island in the Sky these adaptations of the comic strip were ghostwritten by Gaylord Du Bois and illustrated by Hal Forrest:

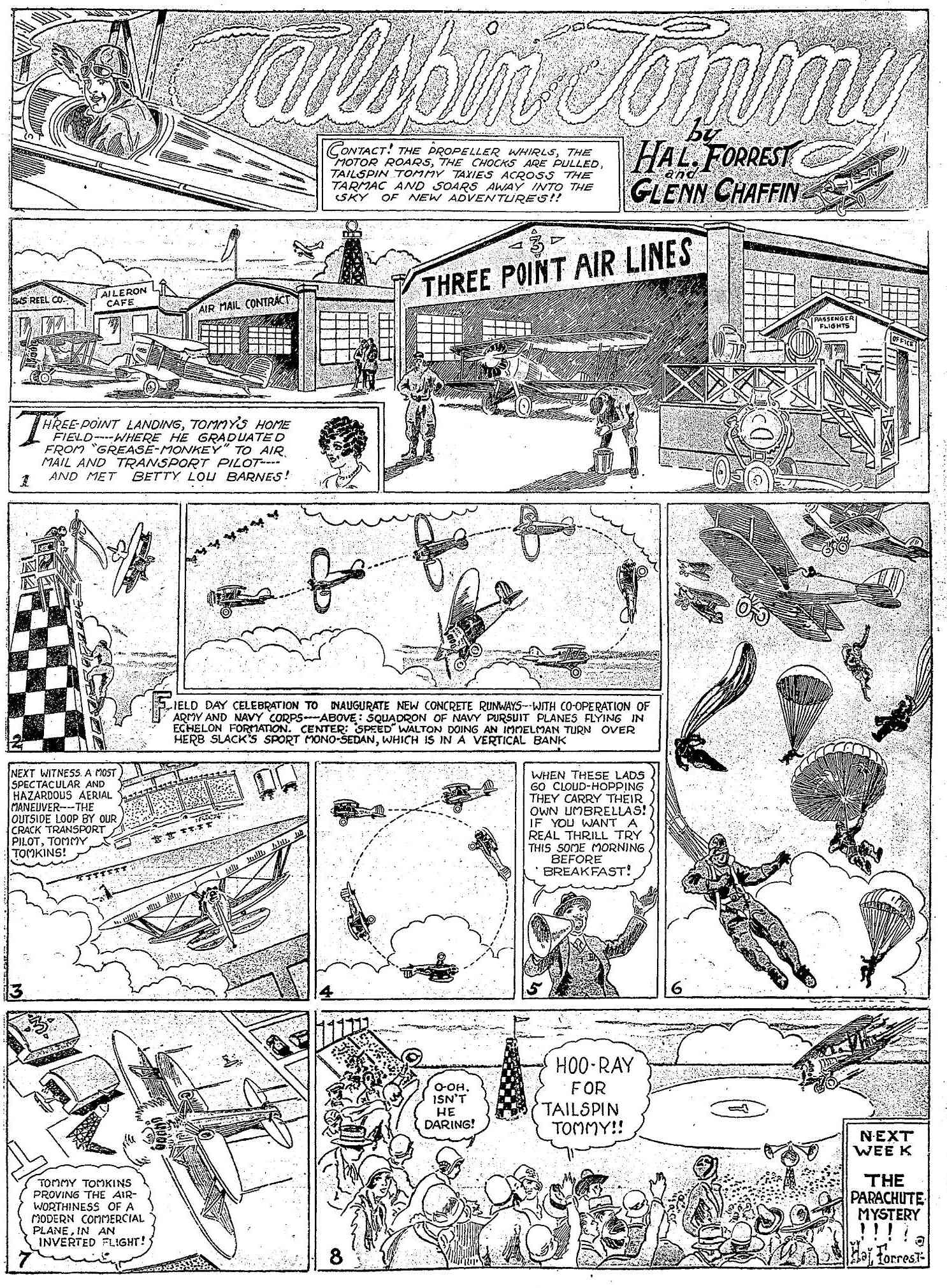
Hal Forrest's Tailspin Tommy (October 27, 1929)

- Tailspin Tommy in The Famous Pay-Roll Mystery, 1933
- Tailspin Tommy - The Dirigible Flight to the North Pole, 1934
- Tailspin Tommy - Hunting for Pirate Gold, 1935
- Tailspin Tommy and the Island in the Sky, 1936
- Tailspin Tommy and the Hooded Flyer, 1937
- Tailspin Tommy and the Sky Bandits, 1938
- Tailspin Tommy in The Great Air Mystery (starring Noah Beery), 1938 (based on the screenplay of the serial)
- Tailspin Tommy and the Lost Transport, 1940
- Tailspin Tommy, The Weasel, and His Skywayman, 1941

Others:

- Tailspin Tommy, a Big Little paperback (no subtitle), 1935
- Tailspin Tommy in Flying Aces, from Dell Publishing, 1938

A novel by Mark Stevens, Tailspin Tommy: The Mystery of the Midnight Patrol, was published by Grosset & Dunlap in 1936
