= Found Alive (1933 film) =

1933 film

- Directed by: Charles Hutchison
- Written by: Jacob Conn; Adrian Johnson
- Starring: Barbara Bedford; Maurice Murphy; Robert Frazer
- Cinematography: William C. Thompson
- Edited by: Rose Smith
- Production company: Ideal Pictures
- Distributed by: Olympic Pictures
- Release date: April 11, 1933
- Running time: 65 minutes
- Country: United States
- Language: English

Found Alive is a 1933 American pre-Code drama film directed by Charles Hutchison, starring Barbara Bedford, Maurice Murphy and Robert Frazer.

The film's sets were designed by the art director Paul Palmentola.

== Cast ==
- Barbara Bedford as Edith Roberts
- Maurice Murphy as Bobby Roberts
- Robert Frazer as Harry Roberts
- Edwin Cross as Brooke, the Butler
- Ernie Adams as C.S. King, Hunter
- Audrey Telley as Audrey
- Cy Ceeder as Cy
- Gordon De Main as Attorney
- Henry Hall as Judge
- 'Snake' King as Snake
- Stella Zerco as Stella

== Bibliography ==
- Michael R. Pitts. Poverty Row Studios, 1929–1940: An Illustrated History of 55 Independent Film Companies, with a Filmography for Each. McFarland & Company, 2005.
