= Pirate Treasure =

- Directed by: Ray Taylor
- Written by: Ella O'Neill; George H. Plympton; Jack Nelson; Basil Dickey
- Produced by: Henry MacRae
- Starring: Richard Talmadge; Lucille Lund; Walter Miller; Patrick H. O'Malley, Jr. Ethan Laidlaw; William Desmond
- Cinematography: Richard Fryer
- Edited by: Saul A. Goodkind
- Music by: Heinz Eric Roemheld
- Distributed by: Universal Pictures
- Release date: 1934
- Running time: 12 chapters (240 minutes)
- Country: United States
- Language: English

Pirate Treasure is a 1934 Universal film serial. It was the twenty-first sound serial released by Universal, of the sixty-nine they released in total (it was the eighty-ninth serial if Universal's silent serials are considered as well, of a total of 137 serials). It was a rare example of the swashbuckling genre in the film serial medium.

Ray Taylor directed Richard Talmadge, Lucille Lund and Walter Miller (as the hero, love interest and villain respectively). The serial is especially praised for the stunt work of Talmadge.

== Plot ==
Aviator Dick Moreland uses his winnings from a recent flight to fund an expedition to recover treasure buried by his pirate ancestor. However, Stanley Brasset, another member of Moreland's club, steals his map and sets out to find the treasure for himself. Dorothy Craig becomes involved when Dick needs her car to chase Brasset's henchmen and recover the map, which results in Dorothy being kidnapped and requiring rescue by Dick. When told of the treasure, Dorothy offers her father's yacht to take them to the island. Unable to retain the map, Brasset joins the expedition (his identity as the villain unknown to the protagonists) with henchmen hidden aboard. The henchmen are discovered and attempt to take over the ship en route to the Caribbean but this fails. Brasset releases them again after arrival to stop Dick from recovering the treasure. The treasure chest itself is empty and the search by the two parties continues on the island. Island natives eventually capture Brasset and his henchmen and plan to sacrifice them. Dick intervenes and they are brought back to America as prisoners.

== Cast ==
- Richard Talmadge as Dick Moreland, aviator and adventurer
- Lucille Lund as Dorothy Craig
- Walter Miller as Stanley Brasset, villain
- Patrick H. O'Malley, Jr. as John Craig, Dorothy's father
- Ethan Laidlaw as Curt, One of Brasset's henchmen
- William Desmond as Captain Jim Carson
- William L. Thorne as Drake
- Del Lawrence as Robert Moreland

== Production ==
Pirate Treasure is a rare swashbuckling serial and the best example of the type.

== Critical reception ==
Due to its eerie background and the stunt work of Richard Talmadge, Cline considers Pirate Treasure the most memorable of the costume serials. Hans J. Wollstein at Allmovie does not consider the acting or writing to be of a high standard but praises the stunts: "Talmadge's acrobatics are as exciting today as they must have been in 1934." Wollstein especially highlights the stunt in chapter three (Wheels of Fate) in which Talmadge falls between awnings from the top of a building.

== Chapter titles ==
1. Stolen Treasure
2. The Death Plunge
3. The Wheels of Fate
4. The Sea Chase
5. Into the Depths
6. The Death Crash
7. Crashing Doom
8. Mutiny
9. Hidden Gold
10. The Fight for the Treasure
11. The Fatal Plunge
12. Captured

_{Source:}

== Cliffhangers ==
=== Cliffhangers ===
1. Stolen Treasure: The speeding car carrying Dick goes over a cliff into the sea.
2. Death Plunge: Dick is thrown from the roof of a tall building by Brasset's henchmen.
3. Wheels of Fate: Dick, on a motorbike, heads towards a narrow bridge blocked by the henchmen's truck.
4. Sea Chase: The motorboat carrying Dick & Dorothy collides with one piloted by Brasset's henchment.
5. Into the Depths: Dick falls from the ship's rigging into the sea.
6. The Death Crash: Dick and henchmen go over a cliff in a speeding car.
7. Crashing Doom: Dick falls to the deck of the ship during a loading accident.
8. Mutiny: Dick enters the burning cargo hold.
9. Hidden Gold: Dick is attacked by the henchmen and falls over a cliff.
10. Fight for the Treasure: Dick and Dorothy are caught in an explosion rigged by Brasset.
11. Fatal Plunge: Dick is attacked by crocodiles while fighting in a swamp.

=== Resolutions ===
1. Death Plunge: Dick swims back to land.
2. Wheels of Fate: Dicks fall is broken by a series of awnings.
3. Sea Chase: Dick drives over the side of the bridge, landing on a train below.
4. Into the Depths: Dick & Dorothy rescued by Dorothy's father.
5. The Death Crash: Dick survives the fall.
6. Crashing Doom: Dick survives the fall.
7. Mutiny: Dick's fall is broken by sacks of flour.
8. Hidden Gold: The crew extinguish the fire.
9. Fight for the Treasure: Dick survives the fall.
10. Fatal Plunge: Dick and Dorothy survive but are trapped in the cave.
11. Captured: Dick survives the crocodiles.

== See also ==
- List of film serials by year
- List of film serials by studio

Preceded by The Perils of Pauline (1933)	Universal Serial; Pirate Treasure (1934)	Succeeded by The Vanishing Shadow (1934)
