= Joseph E. Bernard =

American actor (1880–1958)

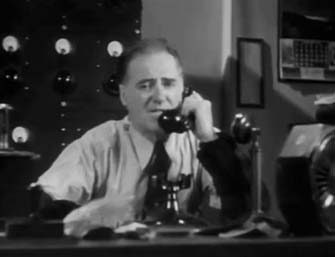
- Bernard in the 1934 film, Murder in the Clouds
- Born: June 1, 1880; New Orleans, Louisiana, U.S.
- Died: October 18, 1958 (aged 78); Los Angeles, California, U.S.
- Occupation: Actor
- Years active: 1930–51

Joseph E. Bernard (June 1, 1880 – October 18, 1958) was an American character actor of the 1930s and 1940s.

== Biography ==
Bernard was born in New Orleans, Louisiana, to James Alfred Bernard and Katherine Bernard (née Tuite). He had a younger brother, Alfred Aloysius Bernard. Bernard made his film debut in a featured role in the 1929 film short, Meet the Wife During his twenty-year career, Bernard appeared in over 120 films. His roles consisted mainly of unnamed, un-credited roles, although he would occasionally be given a slightly larger role, such as the part of Lavery in Moonlight in Vermont. One of his largest roles was his last, as Gibby in the classic romantic comedy Pat and Mike (1952), starring Spencer Tracy and Katharine Hepburn. He had also worked with Spencer and Hepburn three years earlier, playing Spencer's father, Mr. Bonner, in another classic romantic comedy, Adam's Rib (1949). Bernard died on October 18, 1958, in Los Angeles County, California.

== Selected filmography ==
- Their Own Desire (1929) - Doctor (uncredited)
- Lilies of the Field (1930) - Mildred's lawyer
- The Truth About Youth (1930) - Headwaiter (uncredited)
- The Hot Heiress (1931) - Rupert - Hunters' Butler (uncredited)
- The Sin of Madelon Claudet (1931) - Butler Saying Job Already Filled (uncredited)
- The Ruling Voice (1931) - Sneed's Secretary (uncredited)
- It's Tough to Be Famous (1932) - Photographer (uncredited)
- Two Against the World (1932) - Coffee Mug Waiter (uncredited)
- No Other Woman (1933) - Butler
- Zoo in Budapest (1933) - Doctor Attending Chimpanzee (uncredited)
- Mary Stevens, M.D. (1933) - Bellocona Steward Bringing Purse (uncredited)
- I've Got Your Number (1934) - Headwaiter (uncredited)
- Success at Any Price (1934) - The Martins' Butler (uncredited)
- Three on a Honeymoon (1934) - Assistant Engineer (uncredited)
- The Life of Vergie Winters (1934) - Lawton - Preston's Butler (uncredited)
- The Man with Two Faces (1934) - Stage Doorman (uncredited)
- Marie Galante (1934) - Port Controller (uncredited)
- Murder in the Clouds (1934) - Operator (uncredited)
- The Woman in Red (1935) - Steward on Yacht (uncredited)
- The Whole Town's Talking (1935) - Policeman (uncredited)
- Folies Bergère de Paris (1935) - Butler (uncredited)
- A Night at the Ritz (1935) - Captain of Waiters (uncredited)
- While the Patient Slept (1935) - 'Murph' Murphy - the Ballistics Expert (uncredited)
- Mary Jane's Pa (1935) - Plainclothesman with Sheriff (uncredited)
- The Hoosier Schoolmaster (1935) - Randall
- Going Highbrow (1935) - Deck Steward (uncredited)
- Broadway Gondolier (1935) - Studio Official (scenes deleted)
- Small Town Girl (1936) - Bartender (uncredited)
- The Bride Walks Out (1936) - McKenzie's Butler (uncredited)
- M'Liss (1936) - Doctor (uncredited)
- The Captain's Kid (1936) - Courtroom Spectator (uncredited)
- Make Way for a Lady (1936) - Train Conductor (uncredited)
- Lady from Nowhere (1936) - Conductor
- They Wanted to Marry (1937) - Mason (uncredited)
- History Is Made at Night (1937) - Headwaiter at Victor's (uncredited)
- Midnight Taxi (1937) - Copy Reader (uncredited)
- That I May Live (1937) - Night Watchman (uncredited)
- She Had to Eat (1937) - Railroad Man (uncredited)
- Wild and Woolly (1937) - Townsman (uncredited)
- Saratoga (1937) - Auction Attendant (uncredited)
- White Bondage (1937) - Man in Barber Shop (uncredited)
- Madame X (1937) - Deck Steward on Yacht (uncredited)
- Conquest (1937) - Minor Role (uncredited)
- Wells Fargo (1937) - Customer (uncredited)
- Go Chase Yourself (1938) - Daniels' Butler (uncredited)
- Law of the Underworld (1938) - Frank - Headwaiter (uncredited)
- Yellow Jack (1938) - Carpenter - Soldier (uncredited)
- You Can't Take It with You (1938) - Neighbor (uncredited)
- Young Dr. Kildare (1938) - Waiter at Sullivan's (uncredited)
- Next Time I Marry (1938) - Man Watering Lawn (uncredited)
- The Great Man Votes (1939) - 'Brad' Bradley (uncredited)
- Tell No Tales (1939) - Man in Courtroom Corridor (uncredited)
- Bachelor Mother (1939) - Store Watchman (uncredited)
- Beau Geste (1939) - Legionnaire (uncredited)
- Thunder Afloat (1939) - Fisherman (uncredited)
- Three Sons (1939) - Pardway's Butler (uncredited)
- Danger Flight (1939) - Brown
- Laddie (1940) - Tom Crispin (uncredited)
- 20 Mule Team (1940) - Second Barfly Counting Bill's Money (uncredited)
- The Saint Takes Over (1940) - Customs Inspector (uncredited)
- The Captain Is a Lady (1940) - Man in Store (uncredited)
- Anne of Windy Poplars (1940) - Station Agent (uncredited)
- Cross-Country Romance (1940) - Jake - Man with Newspaper (uncredited)
- I Love You Again (1940) - Watchman (uncredited)
- They Knew What They Wanted (1940) - The R.F.D.
- Kitty Foyle (1940) - Nightclub Waiter #1 (uncredited)
- Arkansas Judge (1941) - Mr. Walters - Paint Store Owner (uncredited)
- A Girl, a Guy and a Gob (1941) - Tattoo Artist (uncredited)
- Sign of the Wolf (1941) - Hank
- Tom, Dick and Harry (1941) - Judge in Dream (uncredited)
- Wild Geese Calling (1941) - Waiter (uncredited)
- Father Takes a Wife (1941) - Senior's Butler (uncredited)
- Playmates (1941) - Thomas (uncredited)
- Four Jacks and a Jill (1942) - Jailer (uncredited)
- Obliging Young Lady (1942) - Dining Car Headwaiter (uncredited)
- The Mystery of Marie Roget (1942) - Man (uncredited)
- My Gal Sal (1942) - Minor Role (uncredited)
- Syncopation (1942) - Page Boy (uncredited)
- Thundering Hoofs (1942) - Hank - Stage Driver
- Tales of Manhattan (1942) - Wally, the Postman (Robinson sequence) (uncredited)
- Apache Trail (1942) - Tall Man (uncredited)
- Reunion in France (1942) - R.R. Mechanic (uncredited)
- Follow the Band (1943) - Mr. Hawkins (uncredited)
- Raiders of San Joaquin (1943) - Jim Blake
- Action in the North Atlantic (1943) - Ed (uncredited)
- The Sky's the Limit (1943) - Third Bartender (uncredited)
- Hers to Hold (1943) - Mr. Kitnacker (uncredited)
- A Lady Takes a Chance (1943) - Gambler (uncredited)
- Watch on the Rhine (1943) - Trainman (uncredited)
- Crazy House (1943) - Car Owner / Swiss Bellringer (uncredited)
- Gildersleeve on Broadway (1943) - Mr. Underwood, Postman (uncredited)
- Government Girl (1943) - Workman (uncredited)
- Happy Land (1943) - Clerk (uncredited)
- Moonlight in Vermont (1943) - Lavery
- Home in Indiana (1944) - Man Seated in Barn (uncredited)
- The Very Thought of You (1944) - Mailman (uncredited)
- Can't Help Singing (1944) - Boat Official (uncredited)
- Roughly Speaking (1945) - Minister (uncredited)
- The Picture of Dorian Gray (1945) - Violinist (uncredited)
- Sudan (1945) - Horse Owner (uncredited)
- Honeymoon Ahead (1945) - Old Man (uncredited)
- Where Do We Go from Here? (1945) - Burgher (uncredited)
- Nob Hill (1945) - Printer (uncredited)
- Within These Walls (1945) - Conductor
- Anchors Aweigh (1945) - Old Doorman (uncredited)
- State Fair (1945) - Ring-Toss Spectator (uncredited)
- House of Dracula (1945) - Brahms - Coroner (uncredited)
- Frontier Gal (1945) - Card Dealer (uncredited)
- Tangier (1946) - Man (uncredited)
- Night in Paradise (1946) - Old Man (uncredited)
- Sister Kenny (1946) - Ticket Taker (uncredited)
- No Leave, No Love (1946) - Mrs. Hanlon's Friend (uncredited)
- Criminal Court (1946) - Luther - Barnes' Valet (uncredited)
- It's a Wonderful Life (1946) - Townsman (uncredited)
- California (1947) - Miner (uncredited)
- The Beginning or the End (1947) - Townsman (uncredited)
- The Sea of Grass (1947) - Homesteader (uncredited)
- The Egg and I (1947) - Asa Pettingrew (uncredited)
- I Wonder Who's Kissing Her Now (1947) - Train Conductor (uncredited)
- Life with Father (1947) - Cashier (uncredited)
- Pirates of Monterey (1947) - Doctor (uncredited)
- My Wild Irish Rose (1947) - Bus Driver (uncredited)
- A Double Life (1947) - Joe - Landlady's Husband (uncredited)
- April Showers (1948) - Hotel Guest (uncredited)
- Silver River (1948) - Riverboat Captain (uncredited)
- I Wouldn't Be in Your Shoes (1948) - Apartment House Manager
- The Velvet Touch (1948) - Doorman (uncredited)
- The Clay Pigeon (1949) - Hotel Manager (uncredited)
- Arctic Manhunt (1949) - Clem Phillips (uncredited)
- Adam's Rib (1949) - Mr. Bonner - Adam's Father (uncredited)
- Pat and Mike (1952) - Gibby (final film role)
