= John Trent (actor) =

American aviator and actor

- Screenshot of John Trent as Tailspin Tommy In Danger Flight (1939)
- Born: LaVerne Ward Browne; December 5, 1906; Orange, California, US
- Died: May 12, 1966 (aged 59); Torrance, California, US
- Other name: "Brownie"
- Occupations: Actor, pilot

John Trent (born LaVerne Ward Browne, December 5, 1906 – May 12, 1966) was an aviator-turned-actor-turned-aviator, best known as an actor for the "Tailspin Tommy" adventure film series in the 1930s. From 1931 to 1941, under the stage name John Trent, Browne appeared in 16 Hollywood films. While flying was a natural for him, acting was not, and he eventually turned his back on his Hollywood career, resuming his career in aviation, as a test pilot.

== Early life ==
Born in Orange, California, as the third child of Edwin J. Browne, a farm worker, and Phebe Alice Proctor Browne. His first focus was in the legal field. Attending the University of Southern California (USC), he switched career aspirations only after completing his law studies.

== Aviation ==
Browne attended the Hancock School of Aeronautics and Flying School, Santa Maria, California. He found steady work as a commercial pilot for Transcontinental & Western Airways flying the Douglas DC-2 airliner, just entering service. He was also commissioned as a second lieutenant in the United States Army Air Corps Reserve.

== Film career ==
When the pilot was noticed by B. P. Schulberg, a Paramount Pictures executive, who happened to be a passenger on one of his TWA DC-2 flights, Browne was encouraged to try acting. Heading for Los Angeles, he did a screen test, was put on contract, and given the name, John Trent. (Note: Although unbilled in a number of early 1930s films, there was another actor named John Trent.)

There was one stipulation Trent made with TWA before signing with Paramount... that the airline would put him on reserve in case things didn't work out. They agreed, paying him $1 per month as he remained on reserve status.

TWA press agent Bill Wagner writing in the TWA Skyliner Magazine described the first days for Trent in Hollywood. "On the set and off, Brownie is universally well-liked by his fellow workers, and your correspondent can assure you from personal knowledge that a great sigh of relief has gone up from the Schulberg lot, because John Trent has not 'gone Hollywood'. Three months ago, Brownie alighted in Hollywood to be greeted by the usual 'gag' pictures arranged by the studio, after which we thought he would be forgotten to a greater or lesser degree. But Mr. Schulberg had taken such a liking to Brownie that he began an immediate 'build-up' of the former TWA pilot. Brownie became 'JOHN TRENT' for the screen and was immediately given a good part in John Meade's Woman, starring Edward Arnold."

With no training and few natural instincts in the art of performing, Trent started off slowly in bit parts. As his visibility grew, he still remained pretty much overlooked in most as the second lead or supporting "B" movie roles presented to him at the time. He gained a popular following in Badge of Honor (1934), A Doctor's Diary (1937), John Meade's Woman (1937), The Great Gambini (1937) and Blossoms on Broadway (1937). Paramount cast him opposite Ann Dvorak in the comedy, She's No Lady (1937) but he proved to be a "rather wooden leading man".

=== Tailspin Tommy ===
Monogram Pictures cast him in four films based on the comic strip aviator, "Tailspin Tommy." Trent was a natural for the part of the obsessed youthful pilot who became the focus of a popular comic strip years back during the Charles Lindbergh craze of the late 1920s. He would be supported by co-star Marjorie Reynolds as girlfriend Betty Lou and Milburn Stone as best buddy "Skeeter". (Note: Both actors later would star in 1950s TV with Reynolds starring in The Life of Riley (1953–1958) and Stone in a long-running part in Gunsmoke (1955-1975).) The four films Trent starred in for Monogram were: Mystery Plane (1939), Stunt Pilot (1939), Sky Patrol (1939) and Danger Flight (1939).

Still, his wooden performances in other films sealed his fate and, after two more film roles — as a flight instructor in Monogram's Wolf Call (1939) and in Paramount's I Wanted Wings (1941) (also appearing in the latter in support of Ray Milland and William Holden) — he left Hollywood for good. Trent disparaged his acting, in later years, stating, "It was a pretty good job until politics, sex and long working hours moved in. And when talkies came in, I was finished with my growling voice. Didn‘t go over worth a damn."

== Filmography ==
- The Sky Spider (1931) as Buddy Morgan
- Under-Cover Man (1932) (uncredited)
- Springtime for Henry (1934) (uncredited)
- Badge of Honor (1934) as Harvey Larkin
- John Meade's Woman (1937) as "Mike"
- A Doctor's Diary (1937) as Dr. Dan Norris
- The Great Gambini (1937) as Grant Naylor
- Blossoms on Broadway (1937) as Neil Graham
- She's No Lady (1937) as Alden ["Bill"] Carter III
- Sky Patrol (1939) as [Tailspin] Tommy [Thompson]
- Mystery Plane (1939) as Tailspin Tommy [Tomkins]
- Stunt Pilot (1939) as Tailspin Tommy [Tompkins]
- Danger Flight (1939) as [Tailspin] Tommy [Tomkins]
- Wolf Call (1939) as flying instructor (uncredited)
- Start the Music (Short) (1939) as Doctor Reed
- I Wanted Wings (1941) as Lieut. Ronson

== Aviation career resumed ==
Using his birth name, LaVerne Browne, he returned to "civilian" life in 1941, finding a job as a test pilot, first with the Fletcher Aviation Corporation, flying the Fletcher FBT-2, an experimental "drone controller" on April 26 and 27, 1942.

From 1942 to 1957, Browne worked as a test pilot at Douglas Aircraft in El Segundo, California. First working as a "production test pilot" in 1942, callsign "Tailspin", assigned to the Douglas SBD Dauntless dive bomber program. By 1943, Browne became a project test pilot with his first assignment, the successor to the venerable Dauntless. In March 1945, Browne was appointed Director of Flight Test (chief pilot) of the Douglas El Segundo Flight Test Division.

Browne made the maiden flight of the first XBT2D-1 (Bu No 09085), later to be re-designated the AD-1 Skyraider from Mines Field, California on March 18, 1945. Browne would retire from Douglas in the 1960s. Friends at the company called him, "Brownie" or "Brown with an 'e'."

== Personal life ==
On January 28, 1926, Browne married Dorothy Leonore Bach at Los Angeles, California. They had one daughter, Barbara May Browne, born December 6, 1926, but later divorced. On June 12, 1933, Browne re-married to Harriette Fitzgerald Dodson at Norfolk, Virginia.

== Death ==
At the age of 59, on May 12, 1966, LaVerne Browne died, of cancer, at his home in Torrance, California.
