= Mystery Plane =

- Theatrical release poster
- Directed by: George Waggner
- Screenplay by: Paul Schofield; George Waggner
- Story by: Hal Forrest
- Based on: Tailspin Tommy by: Hal Forrest; Glenn Chaffin
- Produced by: Paul Malvern
- Starring: John Trent; Marjorie Reynolds; Milburn Stone; Jason Robards Sr. George Lynn; Lucien Littlefield
- Cinematography: Archie Stout
- Edited by: Carl Pierson
- Music by: Frank Sanucci
- Production company: Monogram Pictures
- Distributed by: Monogram Pictures
- Release date: March 8, 1939
- Running time: 60 minutes
- Country: United States
- Language: English

Mystery Plane (aka Sky Pilot and Sky Pirate) is a 1939 American action film directed by George Waggner and written by Paul Schofield and George Waggner. The film is based on the comic strip Tailspin Tommy by Hal Forrest and Glenn Chaffin. The film stars John Trent, Marjorie Reynolds, Milburn Stone, Jason Robards Sr., George Lynn and Lucien Littlefield. Mystery Plane, the first of four "Tailspin Tommy" films made by Monogram Pictures, was released on March 8, 1939.

== Plot ==
In the fall of 1923, young Tommy Tomkins (Tommy Bupp) admires Captain Brandy Rand (George Lynn), a World War I ace. Brandy flies in and parachutes out of his aircraft, but lands in a lake. Tommy rescues him in a rowboat, then shows Brandy a scrapbook about the flyer's exploits, who encourages the young man to become a flyer himself.

Many years later, Tommy (John Trent) becomes a pilot and is managing an airport in Shreveport, Louisiana. He designs a radio-controlled bombing device that Tommy and his partner Skeeter Milligan (Milburn Stone) are ready to demonstrate to the Army. The Army commander (John Elliott) is very impressed when they score two direct hits. A gang of spies is also watching the test. The spies, who include a much-weathered Brandy, now a drunk running contraband, have been offered half a million dollars for the device from an enemy country.

Another spy, Anita (Polly Ann Young), asks to take flying lessons from Tommy as a means of watching him and his operation. When he is tricked by a fake message, Tommy is captured by the spies. As he is being interrogated, a drunk and chagrined Brandy comes into the room. The spies then take Skeeter and Tommy's girl friend, Betty Lou Barnes (Marjorie Reynolds), hostage to force Tommy to give them the plans to the bombing device.

Tommy, Skeeter and Betty Lou manage to escape in a biplane. A troop of Army soldiers arrive at the hideout and arrest Anita, while the other spies flee and pursue Tommy in Brandy's aircraft.

Brandy, however, radios Tommy to change course and then crashes his aircraft into the ocean. When the spies are captured, a squadron of Army aircraft equipped with the new bombing device become part of a film shot at Shreveport. Tommy, Betty Lou and Skeeter all laugh at the prospect of "Tailspin Tommy" appearing on the silver screen.

== Cast ==
- John Trent as Tailspin Tommy Tompkins
- Marjorie Reynolds as Betty Lou Barnes
- Milburn Stone as Skeeter Milligan
- Jason Robards Sr. as Paul Smith
- George Lynn as Brandy Rand
- Lucien Littlefield as Winslow
- Polly Ann Young as Anita
- Tommy Bupp as Tommy
- Betsy Gay as Betty Lou
- William P. Carleton as Navy Commander
- John Elliott as Army Colonel
- John S. Peters as Carl
- Sayre Dearing as Fred
- Bruce Mitchell as Detective Capt. Walker
- Mickey Martin as Young Boy
- Jerry Jerome as Joe

== Production ==
"Tailspin Tommy" is listed above the title, Mystery Plane. The opening credits include the following onscreen forward: [The film is a] "tribute to those adventurers who pioneered the American Air Force, the war birds of the World War. Recruited from every walk of life, they wrote a glorious page in aviation history. Being young, many of them were unable to adjust themselves to the peace time routine after their glorious freedom. It is one of those, Captain 'Brandy' Rand, whose life is the basis of our story." (Captain Brandy Rand is a fictional character.) (Note: John Trent, as LaVerne Browne was a pilot for TWA flying Douglas DC-2s.)

In Hal Erickson's review for Allmovie.com, he describes, "In a charming fadeout bit, the main characters—Tommy, Skeeter and girlfriend Betty Lou (Marjorie Reynolds)—come 'out' of the picture to invite their fans to watch the next 'Tailspin Tommy' entry."

== Reception ==
Aviation film historian Stephen Pendo in Aviation in the Cinema (1985) characterized Mystery Plane as part of a period when spies and espionage films were popular. With the global aspects of foreign intrigue and a looming war, 1939 was marked by the release of Flying G-Men film serial, Spies of the Air, Q Planes and Trapped in the Sky.

Mystery Plane, according to aviation film historian James H. Farmer in Celluloid Wings: The Impact of Movies on Aviation, was "action-packed juvenile fun."
