= Tailspin Tommy (serial) =

- Directed by: Lew Landers (as Louis Friedlander)
- Written by: Ella O'Neill (screenplay); Vin Moore; Basil Dickey; Norman S. Hall; Robert Hershon; George H. Plympton
- Based on: Tailspin Tommy by Hal Forrest
- Produced by: Milton Gatzert; Henry MacRae (associate)
- Starring: Maurice Murphy; Noah Beery, Jr. Patricia Farr; Walter Miller; Grant Withers
- Cinematography: Richard Fryer; William A. Sickner
- Edited by: Albert Akst; Irving Applebaum; Saul A. Goodkind; Edward Todd
- Production company: Universal Pictures
- Distributed by: Universal Pictures
- Release date: October 29, 1934
- Running time: 12 chapters (248 minutes)
- Country: United States
- Language: English

Tailspin Tommy is a 12-episode 1934 Universal film serial based on the Tailspin Tommy comic strip by Hal Forrest. Directed by Lew Landers and produced by Milton Gatzert, the serial was the 97th serial of the 137 released by that studio (and the 24th with sound). The plot of Tailspin Tommy concerns a conflict over a government airmail contract. (Note: Along with Mascot Pictures, the lowly "poverty row" studio, Universal Pictures became the only major studio committed to the serial format in the 1930s.)

== Plot ==
Two cargo airlines clash over a government mail contract. "Tailspin" Tommy (Maurice Murphy), a young mechanic, gets a job with Three Points Airlines, which wins the contract. Their opponents resort to sabotage in order to have the contract for themselves. Wade "Tiger" Taggart (John Davidson) becomes their enemy, a man who will do anything to stop the airline from doing business.

After Tommy becomes a pilot, he prevents a runaway aircraft from crashing into a crowd of children, among other adventures that put him into the public eye. Eventually Taggart and his gang are brought to justice. Tommy goes on to win a movie contract, and win the heart of his sweetheart Betty Lou Barnes (Patricia Farr).

== Cast ==
- Maurice Murphy as "Tailspin" Tommy Tompkins
- Noah Beery, Jr. as Peter "Skeeter" Milligan
- Patricia Farr as Betty Lou Barnes
- Walter Miller as Bruce Hoyt
- Grant Withers as Milt Howe
- Charles A. Browne as Paul Smith
- Bryant Washburn as Mr Grant, director of Midnight Patrol
- Belle Daube as Mrs Martha Tompkins, Tommy's mother
- John Davidson as Wade "Tiger" Taggart
- Harrison Greene as the Air circus announcer
- William Desmond as Sloane, Taggart's office henchman
- Lew Kelly as Victor Martin, Three Point airport dispatcher
- John Ince as Eric Peabody, one of Taggart's henchmen
- Lee Beggs as Deacon Grimes
- Ethan Laidlaw as Bart Dirk, one of Taggart's henchmen

== Chapter titles ==
1. Death Flies the Mail
2. The Mail Goes Through
3. Sky bandits
4. The Copper Room
5. The Night Flight
6. The Baited Trap
7. Tommy to the Rescue
8. The Thrill of Death
9. The Earth God's Roar
10. Death at the Controls
11. Rushing Waters
12. Littleville's Big Day

_{Source:}

== Production ==
Tailspin Tommy was the first serial to be based on a comic strip. From 1936 to 1945, Universal almost made more serial adaptations of comic strips than both of their rivals, Columbia and Republic, combined. Jimmy Allen was a rival radio serial character to the Tailspin Tommy newspaper strip. He featured in the film The Sky Parade. Grant Withers played the sidekick in this film as well as both Tailspin Tommy serials.

The aircraft used in Tailspin Tommy included:

- Stearman C2B, c/n n110, NC4099
- Travel Air B 4000, c/n 1337, NC406N and c / n 1323, NC688K
- Great Lakes 2T1 A, c/n 243, NC11326
- Fleet 7
- Douglas M2
- Curtiss Fledgling, c/n 69, N465K
- Waco ATO, c/n A-122, NC925H
- Travel Air R Mystery Plane
- American Eagle A-101
- Alexander Eaglerock A2, c / n 207, NC1412
- Fokker Super Universal
- Boeing P-12 (archive footage)

=== Stunts ===
- George DeNormand
- George Magrill

== Reception ==
William C. Cline wrote In the Nick of Time that Tailspin Tommy was a success, partly due to name recognition. The serial was faithful to its roots and while "other serials were based on comic heroes that have long been forgotten, Hal Forrest's 'Tailspin Tommy' strip ran from 1928 to 1942. Dashing aviator Tommy, his sidekick Skeeter and his girlfriend Betty Lou Barnes ran Three Point Airlines, named after the perfect landing technique. Universal invested heavily in the franchise. Maurice Murphy played Tommy for 1934's Tailspin Tommy serial, and four 1939 feature films starred John Trent as the intrepid airman."
