= The Vanishing Shadow =

- Original serial lobby card
- Directed by: Lew Landers
- Written by: Basil Dickey; George Morgan; Ella O'Neill; Het Mannheim
- Produced by: Henry MacRae
- Cinematography: Richard Fryer
- Edited by: Saul A. Goodkind (supervisor); Alvin Todd; Edward Todd
- Music by: Edward Ward
- Distributed by: Universal Pictures
- Release date: April 13, 1934
- Running time: 12 chapters (242 min)
- Country: United States
- Language: English

The Vanishing Shadow, Chapter 1

The Vanishing Shadow is a 1934 Universal science fiction film serial directed by Lew Landers. It features what is believed to be the first appearance of a hand-held ray gun in film. (apart from The Death Ray). Many science fiction gadgets, including a robot and The Destroying Ray, are also featured in the serial.

== Plot ==
Stanley Stanfield is the inventor of the Vanishing Ray, a wearable device which, when active, leaves only the user's shadow still visible. After meeting with fellow scientist, Carl Van Dorn, a prototype Ray is built. Stanley intends to sell bonds to finance his invention. He inherited them from his late father, the publisher and editor of the local Tribune newspaper, but the stockbroker he meets is corruptly involved with Wade Barnett, the businessman who hounded Stanley's father to his death. Barnett wants the bonds and will go to any length to acquire them. A conflict ensues between Stanley and Barnett during the 12 chapter serial. However, Stanley's new girlfriend, Gloria Grant, is really Gloria Barnett, his enemy's estranged daughter. Neither hero nor villain wants to see Gloria hurt and must work around this motive in their on-going struggle.

Dorgan, Barnett's "spear-point heavy", is unhappy with having to hold back to protect Gloria. Eventually, he captures both Stanley and Gloria, but blackmails his boss to ensure her safety. Barnett turns up with both the ransom money and the police, but he is shot in the ensuing fight. Before dying, he makes his peace with his daughter. Gloria and Stanley finally marry and take over operation of the Tribune.

== Cast ==
- Onslow Stevens as Stanley Stanfield, inventor of the Vanishing Ray and son of the late editor of the Tribune newspaper.
- Ada Ince as Gloria Grant, Stanfield's girlfriend, who is also the estranged daughter of Wade Barnett, having changed her name from the original Gloria Barnett.
- James Durkin as Carl Van Dorn, mad scientist ally of Stanfield
- Walter Miller as Wade Barnett, villainous businessman
- Richard Cramer as Dorgan, Barnett's spear-point heavy
- Edmund Cobb as Kent, one of Barnett's henchman
- Monte Montague as Badger, one of Barnett's henchman
- Al Ferguson as Stroud, one of Barnett's henchman
- Sidney Bracey as Denny, Barnett's office clerk
- J. Frank Glendon as John Cadwell, stockbroker
- William Desmond as Editor MacDonald
- Beulah Hutton as Sal, a gun moll
- Lee J. Cobb as Roadwork Foreman in chapters 3 and 4. This was Cobb's first appearance in films

== Chapter titles ==
1. Accused of Murder
2. The Destroying Ray
3. The Avalanche
4. Trapped
5. Hurled from the Sky
6. Chain Lightning
7. The Tragic Crash
8. The Shadow of Death
9. Blazing Bulkheads
10. The Iron Death
11. The Juggernaut
12. Retribution

_{Source:}

== Availability ==
In his 1998 book on science fiction film serials, Roy Kinnard noted that the serial was difficult to assess as no print of it appeared to have survived. A 35mm nitrate preview trailer containing three minutes of the serial was held by the George Eastman House archive in Rochester, New York. It was unavailable in 1998 for screening, due to it never having been transferred to safety film stock. In 2010 all 12 Chapters of the serial were made available for viewing on YouTube. In August 2019, it was released on DVD by VCI 2019.

== See also ==
- List of film serials
- List of film serials by studio

Preceded by Pirate Treasure (1934)	Universal Serial; The Vanishing Shadow (1934)	Succeeded by The Red Rider (1934)
