= Betsy Gay =

American yodeler and actress (1929–2025)

- Born: Elizabeth Ann Gunst; February 2, 1929; Waterford, Connecticut, U.S.
- Died: June 13, 2025 (aged 96)
- Occupations: Film actress; singer
- Years active: 1935–1970s
- Spouse: Thomas Cashen (m. 1954; died 2005)
- Children: 5

Elizabeth Ann Cashen (née Gunst; February 2, 1929 – June 13, 2025), known professionally as Betsy Gay, was an American actress and country singer and yodeler.

Gay was best known as a child star in the 1930s and 1940s, appearing in the Hal Roach short film series Our Gang, and making appearances in around 40 feature films.

== Early life ==
Gay was born Elizabeth Ann Gunst in Waterford, Connecticut, to Charles and Helen Gay, who were also entertainers. They ran a music store and taught singing, piano, banjo, as well as violin, guitar, bass, steel guitar and accordion.

== Career ==
Gay appeared in films, on television, and in radio shows. Her film career consisted mostly of bit-part roles during the Golden Age of Hollywood, such as Our Gang Follies of 1938 (1937), The Adventures of Tom Sawyer (1938) and Mystery Plane (1939). Her final role was in 1943.

During her singing career, she worked with Dale Evans, Stuart Hamblen and Tex Williams. She won a yodeling competition in California two years in a row in the mid-1940s. She had several music recordings with labels such as Capitol Records and Decca Records.

== Personal life and death ==
Gay was married to Thomas Cashen from 1954 until his death in 2005. The couple had five children. She died on June 13, 2025, at age 96.

== Filmography ==
Year	Title	Role
1935	The Pinch Singer (short)	Broadway number performer
1935	Arbor Day	Dancing girl
1937	When You're in Love	Performing arts student
1937	Nothing Sacred	Group singing role
1937	It Happened in Hollywood	Sis
1937	Our Gang Follies of 1938 (short)	Blonde girl fan of Alfalfa
1938	The Adventures of Tom Sawyer	Susie Harper
1938	Came the Brawn (short)	Effie
1939	Mystery Plane	Betty Lou as a young girl
1939	The Zero Hour	Orphan
1939	At the Circus	Circus midget
1941	Bachelor Daddy	Girl at the movie
1942	How Spry I Am	Young girl
1943	What's Buzzin', Cousin?	Saree
