= Wild Geese Calling =

1941 film by John Brahm

- Directed by: John Brahm
- Written by: Horace McCoy
- Produced by: Harry Joe Brown
- Starring: Henry Fonda; Joan Bennett; Warren William
- Cinematography: Lucien Ballard
- Edited by: Walter Thompson
- Music by: Alfred Newman
- Production company: 20th Century Fox
- Distributed by: 20th Century Fox
- Release date: August 15, 1941
- Running time: 77 minutes
- Country: United States
- Language: English

Wild Geese Calling is a 1941 American drama film directed by John Brahm and starring Henry Fonda, Joan Bennett and Warren William. It was distributed by 20th Century-Fox. The screenplay was written by Horace McCoy, based on a 1940 novel by Stewart Edward White set during the Alaska Gold Rush. The music score is by Alfred Newman.

== Plot ==
In the 1890s a lumberjack, John, travels to Alaska from Seattle in search of gold. He marries a dance hall girl named Sally, but soon finds that she was once in love with his best friend, Blackie.

== Cast ==
- Henry Fonda as John Murdock
- Joan Bennett as Sally Murdock
- Warren William as Blackie Bedford
- Ona Munson as Clarabella
- Barton MacLane as Pirate Kelly
- Russell Simpson as Marshal Len Baker
- Iris Adrian as Mazie
- James C. Morton as Mack
- Paul Sutton as Manager
- Mary Field as Jennie Delaney
- Stanley Andrews as Delaney
- Robert Emmett Keane as Ralph - Headwaiter
- Adrian Morris as Stout Guide
- George Watts as Mush Mahoney
- Charles Middleton as Doctor Jed Sloan
- George Melford as Foreman
- Nestor Paiva as Waiter
- Joseph E. Bernard as Waiter
- Richard Alexander as Alaskan
- Jody Gilbert as Swede

== Bibliography ==
- Fetrow, Alan G. Feature Films, 1940-1949: a United States Filmography. McFarland, 1994.
