= Maurice Murphy (actor) =

American actor (1913–1978)

- Born: October 3, 1913; Seattle, Washington, United States
- Died: November 23, 1978 (aged 65); Los Angeles, California, United States
- Occupation: Actor
- Years active: 1923–1945

Maurice Murphy (October 3, 1913 – November 23, 1978) was an American film actor. Initially a child actor, he graduated to playing older roles, often in action films. His brother Jack Murphy also became an actor.

Early film appearances included in Stella Dallas and as the young Beau Geste in the 1926 film. In 1934 he played the title role in the Universal Pictures serial Tailspin Tommy.

== Filmography ==
Year	Title	Role	Notes
1923	The Self-Made Wife	Tim Godwin Jr.	Film debut
1923	Call of the Wild		
1924	The Last Man on Earth	Elmer's Pal	
1924	Peter Pan	Tootles	
1925	The Home Maker	Henry Knapp	
1925	Thank You	Willie Jones	
1925	Stella Dallas	Morrison Child	
1926	Beau Geste	Beau Geste – Younger	
1926	Flesh and the Devil	Ulrich as a Boy	Uncredited
1927	Alias the Deacon	Willie Clark	
1927	The American		
1928	The Call of the Heart	Little Pete	
1928	The Shepherd of the Hills	Josh O'Day	
1928	The Michigan Kid	Jimmy Cowan – as a Child	
1929	The Spirit of Youth	Ted Ewing	
1929	The Three Outcasts	Dick Marsh – as a Boy	
1929	The College Coquette	Jimmy Doolittle	
1930	All Quiet on the Western Front	Soldier	Uncredited
1930	Hell's Angels	Pilot	Uncredited
1931	Seas Beneath	Merkel	Uncredited
1931	Women Go on Forever	Tommy	
1932	Divorce in the Family	Al Parker	
1932	Faithless	Anthony 'Tony' Wade	
1933	Found Alive	Bobby Roberts	
1933	What Price Innocence?	Maurice Harper	
1933	Pilgrimage	Gary Worth	
1934	Tailspin Tommy	Tailspin Tommy Tompkins	Serial
1934	There's Always Tomorrow	Fred White	
1934	The Man Who Reclaimed His Head	Leon – a Soldier	Uncredited
1935	Private Worlds	Boy In Car	
1935	Curly Top	Jimmie Rogers	
1935	The Crusades	Alan – Richard's Squire	
1936	The Prisoner of Shark Island	Prison Hospital Orderly	
1936	Gentle Julia	Luis	
1936	Down to the Sea	Newland Sanders	
1936	Romeo and Juliet	Balthasar	Uncredited
1937	The Road Back	Albert	
1937	Under Suspicion	Ralph	
1937	Tovarich	Georges Dupont	
1938	The Nurse from Brooklyn	Danny Thomas	
1938	My Bill	Lynn Willard	
1938	Delinquent Parents	Bruce Jefferson	
1938	Secrets of an Actress	Thompson's Assistant	Uncredited
1939	Zaza	Henri	
1939	Forged Passport	'Kansas' Nelson	
1939	Career	Mel Bartholomew	
1939	The Covered Trailer	Bill Williams	
1940	Abe Lincoln in Illinois	John McNeil	
1940	Wolf of New York	Frankie Mason	
1941	The Reluctant Dragon	Baby Weems Storyboard Artist	
1942	To Be or Not to Be	Polish RAF Pilot	Uncredited
1942	Smith of Minnesota	Wayne Smith	Uncredited
1943	Air Force	Harper's Co-Pilot	Uncredited
1943	Destination Tokyo	Toscanini	Uncredited
1943	A Guy Named Joe	Captain Robertson	Uncredited
1944	See Here, Private Hargrove	Lieutenant	Uncredited
1945	Sensation Hunters	Fred Rogers	Final film, Uncredited

== Bibliography ==
- Michael R. Pitts. Poverty Row Studios, 1929–1940: An Illustrated History of 55 Independent Film Companies, with a Filmography for Each. McFarland & Company, 2005.
