= Albert Akst =

American musician, film editor (1899–1958)

- Born: August 31, 1899; New Jersey, U.S.
- Died: April 19, 1958 (aged 58); Los Angeles, California, U.S.
- Occupation: Film editor

Albert Akst (August 31, 1899 – April 19, 1958) was an American musician turned film editor, played saxophone in Meyer Davis Orchestra and in vaudeville until 1930. He became a film cutter of short subjects and later became an editor on 53 feature films, including Forbidden Passage, Johnny Eager, Ziegfeld Follies, Summer Stock, Brigadoon and Meet Me in Las Vegas. He was nominated for an Academy Award for his work on Somebody Up There Likes Me.

Akst was born in New Jersey and died in Los Angeles, California.

== Selected filmography ==
Year	Title	Director
1932	Flaming Guns	Arthur Rosson
1933	The Rustler's Roundup	Henry MacRae
1934	Tailspin Tommy	Lew Landers
1935	A Notorious Gentleman	Edward Laemmle
1935	Princess O'Hara	David Burton
1935	The Raven	Lew Landers
1935	Tailspin Tommy in The Great Air Mystery	Ray Taylor
1939	Home Early	Roy Rowland
1939	One Against the World	Fred Zinnemann
1939	Drunk Driving	David Miller
1940	That Inferior Feeling	Basil Wrangell
1941	Your Last Act	Fred Zinnemann
1944	Meet Me in St. Louis	Vincente Minnelli
