= Robert Hershon =

American poet (1936–2021)

- Born: May 28, 1936; New York City, U.S.
- Died: March 20, 2021 (aged 84); New York City, U.S.
- Education: New York University
- Occupations: Poet; author
- Spouse: Donna Brook
- Children: 2

Robert Hershon (May 28, 1936 – March 20, 2021) was an American poet and the author of thirteen books.

== Life ==
Hershon was born and raised in Brooklyn, New York, He lived in Brooklyn with his wife Donna Brook. He had two grown children, Elizabeth and Jed.

Hershon published fourteen books of poetry. Most recently, "Freeze Frame" (2015) "Goldfish and Rose" (2013); Into a Punchline: Poems 1984–1994 (1994), The German Lunatic (2000), and Calls from the Outside World (2006).

Hershon's work has appeared in American Poetry Review, Poetry Northwest, the World, Michigan Quarterly, Ploughshares, and The Nation, and in numerous anthologies. He has written for the blogs of Best American Poetry and The Poetry Foundation.

Hershon received two creative writing fellowships from the National Endowment for the Arts and three from the New York Foundation for the Arts. He served as the executive director of the Print Center for 35 years and was a co-editor of Hanging Loose Press and Hanging Loose magazine in Brooklyn. He has co-edited collections including Smart Like Me and Shooting the Rat, collections of High School writing.

== Bibliography ==
- Swans Loving Bears Burning the Melting Deer. New Books (1967)
- Atlantic Avenue. Unicorn Press (1970)
- Grocery Lists. The Crossing Press (1972)
- Little Red Wagon Painted Blue. Unicorn Press (1972)
- Rocks and Chairs. Some of Us Press (1975)
- The Public Hug. Louisiana State University Press (1979)
- How to Ride on the Woodlawn Express. Sun (1986)
- 4-Telling (with Dick Lourie, Emmett Jarrett, Marge Piercy). The Crossing Press (1980)
- Into a Punchline: Poems 1984–1994. Hanging Loose Press (1994)
- The German Lunatic. Hanging Loose Press (2000)
- Calls from the Outside World. Hanging Loose Press (2006)
- Goldfish and Rose. Hanging Loose Press (2013)
- Freeze Frame. Pressed Wafer (2015)
- End of the Business Day. Hanging Loose Press (2019)
