= Hal Forrest =

American comic strip artist

Hal Forrest (Philadelphia, July 22, 1892 - 1959) was an American comic strip artist best known for his work on Tailspin Tommy.

== Biography ==
When he was 16, he drew a comic strip, Percy the Boy Scout, for the Philadelphia Telegraph, and a year later he became the youngest scoutmaster in the country, heading the 13th troop established in America. From 1911 to 1915, while attending the Art Institute of Chicago, he was a member of the Chicago Tribune staff and of Troop A, First Illinois Cavalry. In 1915–17, Forrest was a member of Headquarters Troop, Third New Jersey Infantry, and during that period, he collaborated with Lee Pape, author of Little Benn's Notebook, on a color Sunday page of comics for The Philadelphia Record.

On the day war was declared, he enlisted and was assigned to the Aviation Section of the Signal Corps in San Antonio, Texas, where he became Sergeant-Major of 144th Pursuit Squadron, Kelly Field. He created Liberty Loan posters and war cartoons for the Bureau of Public Information. At Kelly Field, he drew cartoons for the camp newspaper, the Kelly Field Eagle, and also was art editor of The Set-up, a camp newspaper in Waco, Texas. While he was with the 479th Pursuit Squadron, U.S. Air Corps Reserve, at Clover Field in Santa Monica, Forrest drew Artie the Ace, the first aviation comic strip, which led him to develop, in 1928, the popular Tailspin Tommy, syndicated in more than 200 newspapers as both a Sunday and daily strip.
